= Australian Centre for Photography =

Photography organisation and gallery in New South Wales, Australia

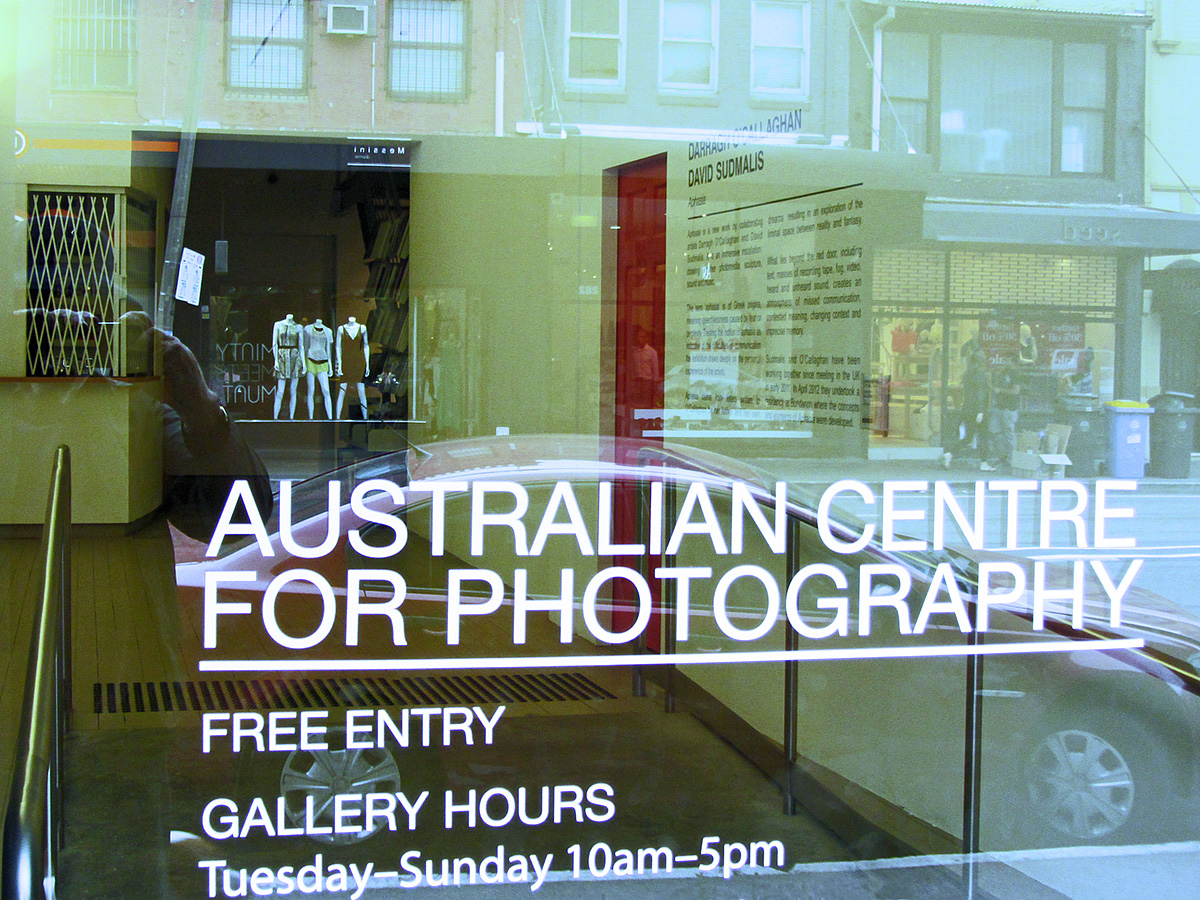
- Established: 1973
- Location: 72 Oxford Street, Darlinghurst, Sydney, New South Wales, Australia
- Coordinates: 33.8788°S 151.21502°E
- Type: Charity
- Founders: David Moore and Wes Stacey
- Website: acp.org.au

The Australian Centre for Photography (ACP) was a not-for-profit photography gallery in Darlinghurst, Sydney, Australia that was established in 1973 and which also provided part-time courses and community programs.

One of the longest running contemporary art spaces in Australia, after a shutdown from 16 December 2020 pending a restructure, it was acquired in October 2022 by the Museum of Applied Arts & Sciences and relaunched as Powerhouse Photography. Powerhouse will continue and expand on ACP programs with commissions, acquisitions, publications, learning and research activities dedicated to the promotion and development of photography in Australia.

The Australian Centre for Photography published Photofile, a biannual photography journal, from 1983.

== Function ==
The Australian Centre for Photography provided a photography gallery and also part-time courses and community programs. Amongst its initiatives were its hosting the Australian Video Festival; presenting public talks by such speakers as Victor Burgin; running an auction in support of Aboriginal protest against the Australian Bicentenary; and administrating displays in Sydney streets and railway stations of posters by Barbara Kruger.

== Photofile ==
Tamara Winikoff, director of ACP (1982–1985) began publication of Photofile, a small community newspaper in 1983 which became a significant journal showcasing Australian photography in a glossy, large format (44cm) and hosting the critiques and debates surrounding it. It was issued 3 times yearly from 1991.

Editors included Mark Hinderaker, Mark Johnson, Ingeborg Tyssen & Tamara Winnikoff (with Robert Tuckwell for one issue) (1983); Mark Johnson (1984–85); Geoffrey Batchen (1985–86); Catherine Chinnery (1987); Catherine Chinnery & Carole Hampshire (1987/88); Ross Gibson (Guest Editor, 1988); Helen Grace (Guest Editor, 1988); Adrian Martin (Guest Editor, 1988); Robert Nery (1988–89); Elizabeth Gertsakis (Guest Editor, 1989); Fiona Macdonald (1990); Martin Thomas (1991–93); Jo Holder (1993–94); George Alexander (1995–97); Jacqueline Millner & Annemarie Jonson (Guest Editors, 1996); Bruce James (1997–99); Blair French (Managing Editor 1998–9); Francisco Fisher (Guest Editor 2000).

Without capital to increase circulation to attract more advertising for its funding, its survival in the 1990s was threatened. Alasdair Foster as director (1998–2011) secured increased financial support, enabling its print run to be increased and for the first time the magazine was distributed nation-wide through newsagents.

From 2010 Photofile was issued as a digital-only publication until Kon Gouriotis began as Director in early 2012 and a print version was relaunched in March 2013. The journal was again relaunched in 2017 under the new editorship of Daniel Boetker-Smith.

An anthology of essays from Photofile was published in 1999 as Photo files: an Australian photography reader edited by Blair French, with a preface by Gael Newton, then Senior Curator of Photography at the Australian National Gallery.

== History ==
On 23 April 1970, leading Australian photographer, David Moore wrote a letter to Wesley Stacey, Grant Mudford and David Beal. In it he asked them to discuss with him the idea of a non-profit, national centre for photography to research, exhibit, publish, collect and advance photography. To examine the situation of photography in Australia he led a committee of other practising photographers Wesley Stacey, Laurence Le Guay, senior curator of the Art Gallery of NSW and Sydney Morning Herald art critic Daniel Thomas, and the director of an architectural and planning firm, Peter Keys, with support from arts commentator Craig McGregor. In July 1973, the Visual Arts Board accepted that there was a need for such a body in Australia and part-funded their proposal to set up a permanent photographic gallery in Sydney.

=== Venues ===
==== Paddington Street ====
Margaret Whitlam opened the first ACP gallery in a corner terrace refurbished by architect Michael Standley at 76a Paddington Street, Sydney, on 21 November 1974 with the initial exhibition Aspects of Australian Photography under inaugural director Graham Howe. That exhibition, expanded with ten more photographers' work to comprise Godwin Bradbeer, Warren Breninger, John Cato, Ian Dodd, Max Dupain, Rennie Ellis, Richard Harris, David Moore, Grant Mudford, Jon Rhodes, Roger Scott, Wesley Stacey, John Walsh and Richard Woldendorp, but with Max Pam who was in the original line-up, being excluded, as noted by Palmer, due to perceived sensitivities about his explicit imagery made in SE Asia, toured to Australian embassies and high commissions in Malaysia, the Philippines, Indonesia, Singapore, Thailand, Japan, Burma, India, Sri Lanka and South Africa (given the end of apartheid) in 1975 and 1976, supported by the Department of Foreign Affairs. Women photographers were not included the initial exhibition of Aspects, nor its touring version, despite the added participants, prompting Deborah Ely, a later director of ACP to comment;

It is a characteristic of the early years of the ACP that its governing culture was exceptionally male ... "debate" between the founding fathers of ACP and feminists grew up over the years and persisted into the 1980s.

==== Oxford Street ====
The organisation subsequently changed the location of its gallery and offices several times. Christine Godden as director oversaw the moving of the Centre in 1981 to Dobell House at 257 Oxford Street, Paddington but in 1989, subsequent director Denise Robertson, previously of Melbourne University Union's George Paton Gallery, finding the Centre suffering from a deficit and a declining public profile, foreshadowed another relocation due to Paddington becoming "too expensive". It shared space with the Sydney Dance Company theatre at Pier 4/5 refurbished at a cost of $16 million to create a venue "second only to the Sydney Opera House", as announced by the Ministry for the Arts in May 1991.

Director Deborah Ely resisted, later saying; "when I joined ACP four years ago we were committed to a relocation at Pier 4/5. It seemed a real pity given this fantastic location and the fact that we'd been in Paddington for 20 years. I thought we should stay and make the most of the existing site." Accordingly, the Oxford Street premises were upgraded after mediation by NSW Ministry for the Arts persuaded the building's vendor the Dobell Foundation, which, with the help of Premier Neville Wran, had purchased the site from the NSW Fire Brigade for $1.5 million, mortgaged it to ACP for $750,000 a 50 рег cent discount, which Ely expected to pay off within 10 years. Its reopening increased the growing number of photography galleries in Sydney with the Byron Mapp Gallery, also in Oxford Street, Stills Gallery in Elizabeth St., the Josef Lebovic Gallery in Paddington Street and, from 15 February 1996, Toast II in Commonwealth Street. Architect James Grose refurbished the ACP by opening the facade up to the street and adding a two-storey extension with a central staircase in a construction by John Lewis and Luigi Rosselli, which integrated galleries, library, darkrooms, studio, digital imaging facilities, specialist bookstall and a restaurant, the latter through an arrangement negotiated protractedly over 1993–1994 variously with entrepreneur Rene Rivkin with caterer Maggi Agostini, then Victoria Alexander and others, to lease the shopfront, with the ACP offices and gallery behind.

==== Chippendale ====
A temporary closure in September 1993 saw refurbishments begin, with further assistance from the Ministry of $50,000 and also its loan of $300,000. In the interim the gallery opened at 27–31 Abercrombie St., Chippendale (6 km closer to the CBD and now housing Galerie pompom) under the name Temporary Hoarding to continue with a few shows into November 1994, including Reflex (12–27 August), sustained by curator/publicist Susan Charlton organising brochures and "Sydney Artbus" public tours. It was not until March 1996 that NSW Premier Bob Carr reopened the centre and launched its first show since December 1994, Inheritance, and its café, which was ultimately a joint venture between Stefano Manfredi of Restaurant Manfredi and Barry McDonald (B & J Lizard produce) and named La Mensa.

==== Darlinghurst ====
From 2011, as photography students increasing turned to courses in tertiary institutions for instruction, revenue from the ACP's film-based workshops continued to fall, and in 2015, the centre was forced to sell its building. It rented accommodation at 72 Oxford Street, Darlinghurst, Sydney. Its next location was at 21 Foley St, Darlinghurst, a kilometre west along Oxford Street from number 72, and closer to the CBD.

=== Directors ===
- Graham Howe 1974–5
- Bronwyn Thomas 1975–1977
- Laurence Le Guay (Acting) October 1977 – February 1978
- Christine Godden 1978–1982
- Tamara Winikoff 1982–1985
- Lawrence Bendle (Acting) 1985
- Denise Robinson 1986–1992
- Deborah Ely 1992–1997
- Alasdair Foster 1998–2011
- Kon Gouriotis 2012–2013
- Suzanne Buljan 2014–2015
- Catherine Baldwin (Acting) 2015–2017
- Cherie McNair 2017–2019
- Pierre Arpin 2019-

== Initiatives ==
The ACP exhibition program delivered the first major retrospectives of Max Dupain, Olive Cotton and Mervyn Bishop. An early opportunity for photographers initiated by the ACP in 1978 was the Colonial Sugar Refinery Project, a commission for six Australian practitioners, Micky Allan, Sandra Edwards, Mark Johnson, Graham McCarter, Lewis Morley and Jon Rhodes, to freely make artistic and documentary work relating to the CSR site at Pyrmont. After its successful exhibition and publication the project was extended into the 1980s and inspired other art-based, non-commercial collaborations with industry. Signature Works - 25th Anniversary Exhibition, in 1999 included works by Fiona Hall, Bill Henson, Carol Jerrems, Maria Kozic, Tracey Moffatt, Max Pam, Patricia Piccinini, Jon Rhodes, Michael Riley, and Anne Zahalka selected by 25 Australian photographic curators, writers, artists and academics, and was a contemporary survey indicative of the national reach of the centre.

== 2020 closure ==
On 19 November 2020 the Australian Centre for Photography, announced it would go into a 'hibernation' from 16 December "due to a cash crunch brought on by COVID-19 lockdown, the shift to smartphone photography and funding cuts.". A restructure of the organisation would protect it from "ongoing financial losses"; ACP Chairman, Michael Blomfield said: "our organisation will not receive any operational funding from federal or state funding bodies for the next three years as a minimum, it is clear that continuing to operate in our current form is a pathway to extinction." Blomfield, decried the decision as a 'painful one', with 21 staff affected.

Coincident with the closure of the ACP, planning was taking place for a National Centre for Photography, with galleries, library, darkroom, an archive and education program, to be opened in regional Ballarat, funded with $6.7 million from the Victorian state government. The city is home to the Ballarat International Foto Biennale which has been running since 2005.

== Powerhouse Photography ==
Two years after the Australian Centre for Photography had been mothballed and had laid off staff due to a shortage of funds and COVID restrictions, and after a series of community consultations, in October 2022 it was announced that Sydney's Powerhouse, the major branch of the Museum of Applied Arts & Sciences, had acquired the Australian Centre for Photography in an agreement in which Powerhouse acquired ACP's photography archive and fund, worth approximately $1.6 million. New South Wales Minister for the Arts Ben Franklin noted that;

The Powerhouse Photography initiative declares photography’s cultural value at the precise moment we may have forgotten its significance in art and design, through to science, medicine, law, communication and commerce.

It operates under the new name of Powerhouse Photography, which on its website notes that it is "supported by funds generously donated by the Australian Centre for Photography", and will continue and expand on ACP programs with commissions, acquisitions, publications, learning and research activities dedicated to the promotion and development of photography in Australia. Funds from the Australian Centre for Photography will provide a photography research fellowship, tertiary internship program, contemporary photography acquisition program, and industry day.

An Advisory group has been formed, and first convened in October 2022, to oversee Powerhouse Photography and to industry connections, and inform curatorship. It is co-chaired by photographer and University of Technology Sydney Associate Professor, Cherine Fahd and Powerhouse Senior Curator Sarah Rees. The panel comprises photographer, filmmaker and ACP board member Merilyn Fairskye; Friends of ACP member Lisa Moore; photographer Garry Trinh; photographer Hugh Stewart; photographer Meng-Yu Yan; photographer Tom Blachford; Powerhouse Director First Nations Emily McDaniel; Powerhouse Head of Curatorial Jacqui Strecker; and Powerhouse Artistic Associate Zan Wimberley.

The 50th anniversary of ACP occurred in 2024, and Powerhouse had plans to deliver a curated digital program to celebrate it, and through its publishing arm, Powerhouse Publishing, to release a major publication on Australian photography. Powerhouse Chief Executive Lisa Havilah recognised the long-term achievements of the organisation;

For nearly 50 years, ACP has cemented the importance of photography in contemporary culture by championing a diverse range of artists. It’s our privilege to play a part in shaping the future of photographic practice in Australia, building on the exceptional work of ACP, under the expert guidance of the Powerhouse Photography Advisory Group. We thank the ACP’s Board of Directors and Friends of the ACP for entrusting us with this responsibility and opportunity.

In 2025 Powerhouse announced photography commission recipients of $20,000 each; Guwa-Koa, Gungarri, and Kuku Yalanji photographer Jo-Anne Driessens who had won the First Nations Right of Reply Photography Commission and Tasha Tylee who received the Architectural Commission; each being collaborations with Powerhouse over 12 months to produce major new works.

== Exhibitions held by the Australian Centre for Photography ==
Year	Dates	Title	Participants	Ref
1974	21 Nov – 18 Jan	Aspects of Australian Photography	Ian Dodd, Ken Middleton, Grant Mudford, Max Pam, Phillip Quirk, John Walsh	
1975	22 Jan – 15 Feb	A Statement of Fact-Henry King 1955–1923	Henry King	
1975	22 Jan – 15 Feb	Graham McCarter	Graham McCarter	
1975	18 Feb – 10 Apr	A Question of Attitude	Richard Harris, John Williams	
1975	18 Mar – 10 Apr	Selected Masters	Robert Capa, Werner Bischof, August Sander, Edward Steichen, F.M. Sutcliffe	
1975	18 Mar – 10 Apr	Work in Progress	Various	
1975	15 Apr – 10 May	Time and Space	Greg Weight and Roger Scott	
1975	13 May – 14 Jun	Elliott Erwitt-Photographs and Anti- photographs	Elliott Erwitt	
1975	17 Jun – 12 Jul	Instant Images-Polaroid progress	Various	
1975	June	Viewpoints	Ansel Adams, David Baila, Walker Evans, Yousuf Karsh, Ulrich Mark, Sarah Moon, Lennart Missun, Kishin Shinoyama, Jeanloup Sieff, Josef Sudek, Olivieru Juscan, Minor White and others	
1975	16 Jul – 16 Aug	The Road	Wesley Stacey	
1975	16 Jul – 16 Aug	Time series	Sue Ford	
1975	19 Aug – 20 Sep	Snapshots		
1975	23 Sep – 18 Oct	The Californian Aesthetic	Ed Douglas	
1975	21 Oct – 29 Nov	Max Dupain Retrospective 1930–1975	Max Dupain	
1975	27 Dec – 17 Jan	Melbourne Viewpoints '75		
1976	17 Feb – 13 Mar	From the Land	John Cato and Laurie Wilson	
1976	16 Mar – 10 Apr	Sidetripping	Charles Gatewood	
1976	16 Mar – 10 Apr	Viewpoints	Trevern Dawes, Richard Phillips, John Porter	
1976	13 Apr – 8 May	South African Report	David Goldblatt and Robert Ashton	
1976	11 May – 5 June	Photographs of Children	David Cubby	
1976	8 Jun – 3 Jul	David Moore Retrospective 1940–76	David Moore	
1976	6 – 31 Jul	Christine Godden	Christine Godden	
1976	6 – 31 Jul	Ann Noon	Ann Noon	
1976	3 – 28 Aug	Building the Sydney Harbour Bridge	Henri Mallard	
1976	3 – 28 Aug	Viewpoints	Gary Grealy, Katharine Rogers, Ian Tudor	
1976	31 Aug – 25 Sep	Just Another Sunrise? The impact of bauxite mining on an aboriginal community	Jon Rhodes	
1976	31 Aug – 25 Sep	Polaroid Experience	Charles Eames, Judith Eglington, Sam Haskins, Ikko Rita, Kohmann, Michael Kostinkar, Monique Jaet, Francois Lamy etc.	
1976	28 Sep – 23 Oct	Farm Security Administration	FSA	
1976	28 Sep – 23 Oct	Diane Arbus	Diane Arbus	
1976	26 Oct – 20 Nov	Fifty Photographs	Edward Weston	
1976	26 Oct – 20 Nov	Shadow People	Leon Saunders	
1976	23 Nov – 11 Dec	Selected Photographs	Paul Caponigro	
1976	23 Nov – 11 Dec	The Other Women	Barry Kay	
1976	14 Dec – 22 Jan	Ten Photographers-Brisbane, Canberra, Hobart, Melbourne, Sydney	Stan Ciccone, Sandy Edwards, Steven Lojewski, Virginia Coventry, Gerrit Fokkema, Otten O'Malley, Paul Hopper	
1977	25 Jan – 19 Feb	American Photographs '75	Grant Mudford	
1977	9 Mar – 27 Apr	Bent Photography	Harry Bowers, Ellen Brooks, Steve Colling, Robert Cumming, Steve Fitch, Jack Fulton, Robert Heinecken, Richard Misrach, Carol Tranter (USA West Coast)	
1977	6 Apr – 7 May	Derry Moore and Stella Snead	Derry Moore (UK), Stella Snead (USA)	
1977	11 May – 4 Jun	Lee Friedlander	Lee Friedlander	
1977	11 May – 4 Jun	Recent Photographs	Douglas Hollely	
1977	8 Jun – 9 Jul	Sydneyphiles and Clermont, Queensland 1916	Willy Young	
1977	13 Jul – 20 Aug	Ian Dodd 1967–77	Ian Dodd	
1977	24 Aug – 24 Sep		Jan Saudek	
1977	24 Aug – 24 Sep	Australian New Work	Anthony Green, Sandra Irvine, Merryle Johnson, Julie Millowick	
1977	28 Sep – 29 Oct	Diane Arbus	Diane Arbus	
1977	27 Nov – 3 Dec	Athol Shmith	Athol Shmith	
1977	27 Nov – 3 Dec	Paul Cox	Paul Cox	
1977	7 Dec – 21 Jan	Bent Photography	Harry Bowers, Ellen Brooks, Steve Colling, Robert Cumming, Steve Fitch, Jack Fulton, Robert Heinecken, Richard Misrach, Carol Tranter (USA West Coast)	
1978	Jan-Feb		Rennie Ellis, Godwin Bradbeer and Warren Breninger	
1978	Mar-Apr		Laurence Le Guay, Stephen Roach	
1978	May- Jun		Herbert Ponting, Frank Hurley and William Clift	
1978	21 Jun		David Mist	
1978	Oct		John Stockdale	
1978	Oct	Australia	Jon Rhodes	
1978	Nov-2 Dec	Retrospective	Harry Callahan	
1978	Nov- 2 Dec	Portraits	Carol Jerrems	
1980	Jan-Feb	Five French Photographers	Bernard Plossu, D.H. Seylan, Mercelle Dupuis	
1980	Mar	Three Australians	Fiona Hall, Brian Thompson, David Blount	
1980	5 Apr – 2 May	Robert Cumming	Robert Cumming	
1980	7 May – 7 Jul	8 South Australian Photographers	Ed Douglas, Wayne Fimo, Trevor Kenyon, Paul Krieg, Joseph McGlennon, Leonie Reisberg, Rod Trinca, Andrew Zummo	
1980	to 16 Aug	The Suspicious Image	Giorgio Colombo	
1981	14 Jan	Four and a Half Months in the North	Glen O'Malley (QLD)	
1981	18 Feb	Cazneaux' Sydney 1904- 1934	Harold Cazneaux	
1981	6 Mar	A Day in the Life of Australia	group show	
1981	17 Apr – 6 May	Living Room Portraits 1979-'81	John Williams	
1981	July	Selections from the Polaroid Collection	group show	
1981	12 Aug – 12 Sep	Fifteen Australian Photographers	Wesley Stacey, Fiona Hall, Peter Elliston, Ingeborg Tyssen, Peter Charuk, Dr Charles Gabriel, Henri Murray	
1981	Sep	In and Out of Space		
1981	Sep	Photographs from the Awesome Universe		
1981	Oct	Death Valley	John Gollings	
1981	Oct	Sydney Foreshores	Mark Johnson	
1981	Nov	Long Beach	Grant Mudford	
1981	Nov	Eleven Years in Asia	Max Pam	
1981	Nov	India and the Enigma	Jon Rhodes	
1981	Dec-Jan	Four Australian Picture Makers	Wayne Fimere, Arthur Georgeson, Fiona Hall, Graham Howe	
1982	Feb	Heatwave	David Moore, Jill White, David Parker, Philip Quirk, Willy Young, Robert McFarlane, Max Dupain	
1982	Feb	Recent Photographs	Peter Charuk	
1982	Mar	C.S.R.Photography Project-Hunter ValleyCoal	group show	
1982	Mar	This Land of Time	Ed Douglas	
1982	May	Carole Conde and Karl Beveridge	Carole Conde, Karl Beveridge (Canada)	
1982	Jul	Swiss Photographers from 1840 until Today	group show	
1982	Jul	Viewpoints	Carolyn Johns, Margaret Olah	
1982	Aug	Western Australian Photographers	7 photographers	
1982	17–26 Sep	David Stephenson	David Stephenson	
1982	Aug-Sep	Viewpoints	Amanda Holt	
1982	Aug-Sep	American Photographs	Mark Burgin	
1982	Aug-Sep	Photographic Works 81–82	Geoff Kleem	
1982		Photographs 1966–1982	Penny Tweedie	
1982		Colour Works	Ann Noon, Matthew Quaass	
1983	5 Jan		Jim Sheldon (USA)	
1986	29 Jan – 27 Mar	The Melbourne Stage	Seham Abi Elias, Rozalind Drummond, Cassandra Lehman, Fiona MacDonald	
1986	5 Mar – 13 Apr	Topographies and Traces	Peter Elliston	
1986	5 Mar – 13 Apr	Thief's Journal	Julie Brown-Rrap	
1986	16 Apr – 11 May	Robert Mapplethorpe	Robert Mapplethorpe	
1986	14 May – 16 Jun	Elsewhere (Biennale)	Graeme Hare, Jacky Redgate, Robyn Stacey, Anne Zahalka, Wayne Fimo	
1986	14 May – 16 Jun	Gold	Brian Thompson	
1986	18 Jun – 20 Jul	Colour	Mark Kimber, Sue Longbottom, Tony Nott, Tim Handfield, Graeme Johnson	
1986	18 Jun – 20 Jul	Pentimento	Robyn Outram, Suzi Coyle, Tanya Sparke, Melody Cruickshank	
1986	30 Jul – 24 Aug	The Hand and the Photograph	Richard Dunn, Mike Parr, Tim Maguire, Adrienne Gaha, John Young, Ruth Waller	
1986	30 Jul – 24 Aug	The First Australian Video Festival		
1986	27 Aug – 28 Sep	Work Sites	Steven Lojewski	
1986	27 Aug – 28 Sep	Wilcannia	Gerrit Fokkema	
1986	17 Oct – 27 Nov	Occlusion	Marian Drew, Joanna Greenwood, David Grofton, Robyn Gray, Margaret Rol, Leanne Ramsay, Ivan Nunn, Anna Zsoldas, Jay Younger	
1986	17 Oct – 27 Nov	The Temptation to Exist	Janet Burchill and Jenny McCamley	
1986	5 Nov – 7 Dec	Fiona Hall	Fiona Hall	
1986	5 Nov – 7 Dec	Family 1972- 1974	Christine Godden	
1986	10 Dec – 15 Jan	Etc.	Third Year students	
1987	21 Jan – 15 Feb	The Glamour Show	Curator Helen Ennis. An Australian National Gallery touring exhibition	
1987	18 Feb – 15 Mar	Reproduction	Janina Green (VIC)	
1987	18 Feb – 15 Mar	Stories of Romance	Ann Wulff (TAS)	
1987	18 Mar – 12 Apr	Image Perfect- Australian Fashion Photography in the Eighties	Guest Curator: Sandy Edwards	
1987	15 Apr – 10 May	Pupil of the Eye	Chris Fortescue (NSW)	
1987	15 Apr – 10 May	Seasons. Pseudo Panoramas	Ian North (SA)	
1987	13 May – 7 Jun	Eight Easy Pieces	Pat Brassington (TAS)	
1987	10 Jun – 5 Jul	Light of Day-The photocopier and time	Lindy Lee and Mike Parr	
1987	10 Jun – 5 Jul	Scenarios	Peter Burgess (AUS/USA)	
1987	8 Jul – 2 Aug	Works from on consignment	Various (replaced Resemblance which failed to arrive from Germany)	
1987	8 Jul – 2 Aug	Red Squares	Rose Farrell (VIC)	
1987	5–30 Aug	Retrospective	Max Dupain	
1987	5–30 Aug	Salon Obscura	Curator: Sally Couacaud. Part of the Australian Video Festival	
1987	17–25 Oct	Origins	Elizabeth Gertsakis (TAS)	
1987	17–25 Oct		Christine Cornish (NSW)	
1987	28 Oct – 22 Nov	A Marginal Body-The Photographic Image in Latin America	Guest Curator: Charles Merewether	
1987	25 Nov – 20 Dec	Resemblance	Anne Zahalka (NSW)	
1987	25 Nov – 20 Dec	The Blue Kingdom	Jay Younger (QLD)	
1987	3 Dec – 8 Dec	Videos by MIMA	MIMA (VIC)	
1988	14–15 Jan	We Have Survived Art Auction	Auction of works by Tony Tuckson, David and Guy Boyd, Robert Klippel, John Olsen, Susan Norrie, Bruce Petty, Frank Hodgkinson and others with proceeds to National Aboriginal Coalition, The Long March for Justice, Peace and Freedom and the Bicentenary Protest Group	
1988	? -28 Feb		Bart Feldman, John Nixon	
1988	to 27 Mar	(Photography) / during Philosophy	Bernard Sachs	
1988	to 27 Mar	Mother Weep While I Think	Helen Kundicevic	
1988	30 Mar – 24 Apr	Museum	Martyn Jolly	
1988	30 Mar – 24 Apr	Photographs by Mutlu Hassan	Mutlu Hassan	
1988	7 Apr	Presentation	Victor Burgin	
1988	27 Apr – 2 May	Tamworth	Judith Ahern	
1988	to 15 June	A Sixtieth of a Second-Portraits of Women 1961–1981	Sue Ford	
1988	2 Jun – 17 Jul	Before the Winter Gardens	Christopher Köller	
1988	2 Jun – 17 Jul	Real Space: False Time and Space in the Apartment	Kathy Payne	
1988	22 Jul – 14 Aug	Honi Soit Qui Mal y Pense	Fiona McDonald	
1988	14 Sep – 9 Oct	Mondi Diversi (Different Worlds)	FILEF (Federation of Italian Migrant Workers and their Families) group show and complimentary radio program	
1988	? Oct – 6 Nov	From the Body of an Archive/From the Archive of a Body	Historical Arthur Foster photographs, printed by Steven Lojewski, curator Mark Jackson, Mitchell Library	
1988	? Nov – 8 Dec	Faite Urbaine	Rozalind Drummond	
1988	? Nov – 8 Dec	Photographs	Ruth Frost	
1988	Dec	Union and Eclipse	Warren Breninger	
1988	Dec	Memory or Au Rebours	Pat Brassington	
1989	17–26 Feb	I Am the Rehearsal Master	Anne Ferran	
1989	17–26 Mar	Repentance	Rose Farrell & George Parkin (VIC)	
1989	17–26 Mar	Figure Works	Janina Green	
1989	29 Mar – 23 Apr	Ordinary Photography	John Lethbridge & John Young	
1989	29 Mar – 23 Apr	Art Fades 1 2 3 4…	Susan Fereday (VIC)	
1989	26 Apr – 21 May	Transfiguration	Bashir Baraki & Vince Dzeikan	
1989	26 Apr – 21 May	Scenes From the Ivory Tower	Ex de Medici (ACT)	
1989	24 May – 18 Jun	Selected Works	Geoff Kleem (NSW)	
1989	24 May – 18 Jun	The Divine Comedy	Fiona Hall (SA)	
1989	21 Jun – 26 Jul	Salle de Reconnaissance	Diena Georgetti, Belinda Gunn, Redford/Webb, Luke Roberts, Hiram To. Curator: Michele Helmrich (QLD)	
1989	21 Jun – 26 Jul	A Glamorous Private History or (Some People Like to eat alone)	Elizabeth Gertsakis	
1989	19 Jul – 8 Aug	Roman Portraits-Threshold	Geoff Weary (NSW)	
1989	19 Jul – 8 Aug	The Voice of No-One-Once Again	Mark Jackson & John Conomos	
1989	16 Aug – 10 Sep	Something More	Tracey Moffatt (NSW)	
1989	16 Aug – 10 Sep	World View	Michael Hutak (NSW)	
1989	13 Sep – 8 Oct	Sons of Empire	Jim Marwood (TAS)	
1989	13 Sep – 8 Oct	That Ocean	Fergus Armstrong (VIC)	
1989	15 Sep	Projected Light	Corinne and Arthur Cantrill (VIC)	
1989	11 Oct – 5 Nov	Transperiphery or travel & connection of peripheries (Chile & Australia)	Eugenio Dittborn (CHILE)	
1989	11 Oct – 5 Nov	Adam's Apple Chile-Tranvestites	Paz Errazuriz (CHILE)	
1989	8 Nov – 3 Dec	The Faces of Men	Peter Burgess (USA)	
1989	8 Nov – 3 Dec	Folly	Jennifer McCamley & Janet Burchill (NSW)	
1989	6 Dec – 24 Dec	Inhabitation	Christl Berg (TAS)	
1989	6 Dec – 24 Dec	Traces	Matt Feeney (QLD)	
1989	6 Dec – 24 Dec	Cartes Postales (video works)	Robert Cahen (FR)	
1990	31 Jan – 4 Mar	The Oedipus Variations	Curator: Fiona MacDonald	
1990	7 Mar – 8 Apr	Photophobia	John Voss (TAS)	
1990	7 Mar – 8 Apr	Unidentified Hostesses	Judith Ahern (NSW/VIC)	
1990	6 Apr – 6 Oct	Add Magic	Pat Brassington, Juan Davila, Jeff Gibson, Maria Kozic, Robyn Stacey, Peter Tyndall	
1990	13 Apr – 3 Jun	Le Voyage de Brise-Glace	Alain Fleischer (FR)	
1990	13 Apr – 3 Jun	Samuel Beckett Teleplays	Curator: Stan Douglas (Canada)	
1990	6 Jun – 8 Jul	Seven Photo- Micrographs	Curator: Stephen Bram (VIC)	
1990	6 Jun – 8 Jul	The Cabinet of Photography	John Nixon (NSW)	
1990	11 Jul – 19 Aug	Evolution After Savagery	Ara Koopelian (NSW)	
1990	24 Aug – 29 Sep	Living in the Seventies: Photographs by Carol Jerrems	Carol Jerrems. Curator: Helen Ennis. An Australian National Gallery Travelling Exhibition	
1990		Bill Viola-Video	Bill Viola (USA)	
1990		David Stephenson-Recent Works	David Stephenson (TAS)	
1990	3–11 Nov	Video Visions-5th Australian International Video Festival		
1990	14 Nov – 6 Dec	Words	Fiona Hall (SA)	
1990	9 -23 Dec	The History of Photography-SCA student work	Curator: Martyn Jolly	
1990	9 -23 Dec	Photograms	Curator: Bronwyn Clark-Coolee	
1991	6 Feb – 10 Mar	Art is Not Enough	group show USA/Australia	
1991	13 Mar – 14 Apr	In Dreams: Mervyn Bishop Thirty Years of Photography 1960–1990	Mervyn Bishop, curated by Tracey Moffat	
1991	17 Apr – 19 May	Flights Home	Hewson/Walker (SA)	
1991	17 Apr – 19 May	Geoff Kleem	Geoff Kleem	
1991	22 May – 23 Jun	The Philosophers Stone	Helen Kundicevic (NSW	
1991	22 May – 23 Jun	Layers of Light	John Daly (NSW)	
1991	26 Jun – 28 Jul	The Slow War-Luxury and Amnesia	Bronia Iwanczak (SA)	
1991	26 Jun – 28 Jul	Fields	Anna Zannella (WA)	
1991	Aug-1 Sep	Furniture Fictions	Lynn Silverman (UK)	
1991	Aug-1 Sep	Combust	Jay Younger	
1991	31 Jul – 17 Sep	Maureen Burns	Maureen Burns (NSW)	
1991	to 17 Nov	One to One	Helen Amanatiadis, Sharon Baker, Maria Barbagallo, Louise Denoon, Gary Frew, Sonia Greig, Craig Hoy, Nicholas Jarman, Joseph Mallard, Kim McClintock, Bronwyn Rennex, Elvis Richardson, Steven Simmons, Frances Tatarovic, Giovanna Trenoweth, Lachlan Warner.	
1991	to 22 Dec	Big shots	Gary Heary	
1992	6 Feb – 7 Mar	Fuel	10 artists on the theme of the millennium, curated by Jay Younger	
1992	2 Apr – 2 May	Portrait of a new South Africa	Peter McKenzie	
1992	7 May – 13 Jun	Patterns of Connection	Leah King-Smith	
1992	18 Jun – 11 Jul	Vast: Photographs from Europe and Antarctica 1990–91	David Stephenson	
1992	22 Jul – 16 Aug	Elvis Sightings	6 artists	
1992	to 12 Sep	Possession and Mirth	Christine Webster	
1992	to 10 Oct	Tlacolmmiquiztli-Ills caused by Love and Desire	Christopher Köller	
1992	to 25 Oct	Horizon	Jaap de Jong (Netherlands)	
1993	16–29 Jan	Original Steal	works by students of the ACP workshop	
1993	to 27 Feb	A Place I've Never Seen	Mathew Jones	
1993	to 27 Feb	S.T.U.D.S. Seductively Transmitted Utopian Dream States	Andy Davey	
1993	to 27 Mar	Surrealism and the Bride	Bruce Searle	
1993	to 27 Mar	Untitled Sequence	Cristel Berg	
1993	1–24 Apr	Dangling Virgins	Eugenia Raskopoulos	
1993	1–24 Apr	"Mavri Xenitia	Effy Alexakis	
1993	to 22 May	Mangrove Creek	Axel Poignant	
1993	to 22 May	Cartographics	Kevin Todd	
1993	to 26 Jun	Mien: Chinese Scrolls, Singapore-Adelaide 1990–93	Alan Cruikshank	
1993	17–24 Jul	The Big Deal is Black	Brenda Croft	
1993	17–24 Jul	Cast-Offs	Destiny Deacon	
1993	29 Jul – 21 Aug	Phantasm	Lynne Roberts-Goodwin	
1994	Feb	Pierre Molinier	Pierre Molinier, auspiced by Sydney Gay and Lesbian Mardi Gras	
Closed for renovations September 1993 - March 1996
1996	21 Mar – 4 May	Inheritance	Sandy Edwards, Fiona Hall, Bill Henson, Debra Phillips, Jon Rhodes, Lynne Roberts-Goodwin, David Stephenson, Les Walking, Anne Zahalka, Dan Armstrong, Destiny Deacon, Walker Evens, Heather Fernon, Carol Jerrems, Anne McDonald, Stephen Marcus, Susan Nakamarra Boko, Sandy Nicholson, Lyndall Phelps, Paul Saint, Danielle Thompson	
1996	10 May – 18 Jun	Bad Light	Jane Burton, Jane Eisemann, Pat Brassington, David McDowell	
1996	10 May – 17 Jun	Silent Measure	Judith Wright	
1996	24 May – 17 Jun	White	Francesca Da Rimini & Josephine Starrs	
1996	7–29 Jun	Where are you now?	Anne Ferran	
1996	7–29 Jun	Landmarks, Watermarks	Bette Mifsud	
1996	5 Jul – 3 Aug	Horizontal	Graeme Hare	
1996	9–31 Aug	Sky of the World	Yvonne Lee Schultz	
1996	9–31 Aug	Screen Options	Mike Stevenson	
1996	6 Sep – 5 Oct	Beyond the Sublime, Part 1	Keith Arrant, Jem Southam, Marie Shannon	
1996	11 Oct – 9 Nov	Beyond the Sublime, Part 2	Chris Barry, Kurt Brereton, Pip Culbert, Paul Handley, Leah King-Smith, Rosemary Laing, Harry Nankin and Janina Green	
1996	15 Nov – 14 Dec	Lushus	Robyn Stacey	
1996/7	20 Dec – 25 Jan	Hearsay; New Photo Artists	Group show	
1996	from March 22	Inheritance	with Bill Henson, Fiona Hall, David Moore and Anne Zahalka	

== See also ==
- Australian Centre for the Moving Image
- Brummels Gallery
- The Photographers' Gallery and Workshop
- Centre for Contemporary Photography
- Galley Museum
- Queensland Centre for Photography
