= List of Australian women photographers =

This is a list of women photographers who were born in Australia or whose works are closely associated with that country.

== A ==
- Bernice Agar (1885–1976), portrait, fashion and society photographer in the late 1910s until the 1930s
- Narelle Autio (born 1969), photojournalist working first in Europe and the USA before returning to Australia in 1998 as staff photographer for the Sydney Morning Herald

== B ==
- Sarah Bahbah (born 1991), photographic artist, with large Instagram following
- Euphemia Eleanor Baker (aka Effie Baker) (1880–1968), photographer of Australian wildflowers and Bahá'í Faith
- Polly Borland (born 1959), now living in England, known both for her portraits of famous Australians and for several series of stylized portraits
- Pat Brassington (born 1942), Tasmanian photographer and digital artist
- Kate Breakey (born 1957), visual artist creating large-scale, hand-colored photographs
- Harriett Brims (1864–1939), pioneer commercial photographer in Queensland
- Amelia Bunbury (1863–1958), photographer from Western Australia, works published in the Western Mail
- Jane Burton (born 1966), Melbourne-based photographer

== C ==
- Emily Florence Cazneau (1855–1892), mother of Harold, see List of New Zealand women photographers
- Alex Cearns, animal photography
- Sarah Chinnery (1887–1970), photographer and diarist
- Pegg Clarke (c. 1890–1959), fashion, portrait, architectural and society photographer
- Beverley Clifford (fl. 1950s), magazine photographer and photojournalist
- Olive Cotton (1911–2003), modernist photographer working in the 1930s and 1940s in Sydney, receiving commissions from the publisher Sidney Ure Smith
- Virginia Coventry (born 1942), photographer of environmental protests
- Brenda L Croft (born 1964), First Nations artist, writer and curator drawing on familial and public archives to explore Indigenous histories and experiences

== D ==
- Destiny Deacon (1957–2024), Queensland photographer of indigenous culture
- Lillian Dean (c.1899–1980), Northern Territory photographer and local politician
- Maggie Diaz (1925–2016), American-born photographer, noted for her 1950s Chicago Collection
- Ada Driver (1868–1954), Australian portrait photographer who ran a studio on Queen street in Brisbane in the early twentieth century
- Rozalind Drummond (born 1955), postmodernism photographic artist

== E ==
- Sandy Edwards (born 1948), documentary photographer and curator of photography, known for personal approach to documentary
- Mireille Eid (Astore) (born 1961), Lebanese-born artist and photographer
- Odette England (born 1975)
- Joyce Evans (1929–2019), opened the first commercial photo gallery in Melbourne, later working herself in portraiture and landscapes, taught history of photography
- Samantha Everton, contemporary photographic artist

== F ==
- Myra Felton (1835–1920), photographer and oil painter
- Anne Ferran (born 1949), photographic artist
- Judith Fletcher (1886–1970), portrait and fashion photographer
- Sue Ford (1943–2009), celebrated photographer of social life, known for her personal approach to her subjects

== G ==
- Anne Geddes (born 1956), stylized photographs of babies published in book-form or calendars
- Juno Gemes (born 1944), Hungarian-Australian known for photography of aboriginals
- Heather George (1907–1983), commercial industrial, fashion and outback photographer and painter
- Kate Geraghty (born 1972), photojournalist for the Sydney Morning Herald, covered the 2002 Bali bombings and 2003 invasion of Iraq
- Viva Gibb (1945–2017), feminist photographer

== H ==
- Liz Ham (born 1975), Sydney-based photographer of urban life, fashion, music and politics, also known for book Punk Girls
- C. Moore Hardy (born 1955), Sydney-based photographer, documenting the Sydney queer community since the late 1970s
- Ponch Hawkes (born 1946), Melbourne-based photographer
- Merris Hillard (born 1949), printmaker and photographer
- Ruth Hollick (1883–1977), Melbourne-based portrait and fashion photographer
- Louisa Elizabeth How (1821–1893), early woman photographer
- Adelie Hurley (1919–2010), first Australian woman press photographer

== J ==
- Carol Jerrems (1949–1980), explored issues of sexuality, youth, identity and mortality

== K ==
- Bronwyn Kidd (born 1969), fashion, magazine and portrait photographer
- Leah King-Smith, photographer and digital media artist
- Katrin Koenning (born 1978), German-Australian photographer, photojournalist and videographer

== L ==
- Pamela Lofts (1949–2012), book illustrator, photographer, and artist

== M ==
- Ruth Maddison (born 1945), explores themes of relationships, communities and families
- Elsie Rosaline Masson (1890–1935), photographer, writer and traveller
- Barbara McGrady (born 1950), indigenous photographer
- Louisa Anne Meredith (1812–1895), writer and early photographer
- Margaret Michaelis-Sachs (1902–1985), see Poland
- Alice Mills (1870–1929), successful photographer in Melbourne
- Jacqueline Mitelman (born 1948), portrait photographer
- Tracey Moffatt (born 1960), explores issues of sexuality, history, representation and race
- May and Mina Moore (May 1881–1931; Mina 1882–1957), New Zealand-born portrait photographers
- Hedda Morrison (1908–1991), see Germany

== N ==
- June Newton (1923–2021), photographs under the pseudonym Alice Springs

== P ==
- Polixeni Papapetrou (1960–2018), noted for her themed photo series about people's identities
- Lillian Louisa Pitts (1872–1947), music teacher and professional photographer

== R ==
- Jacky Redgate (born 1955), sculptor, installation artist and photographer
- Leonie Reisberg (born 1955), photographer and lecturer in photography

== S ==
- Rebecca Shanahan, NSW-based artist and photographer
- Rose Simmonds (1877–1960), British-born Queensland photographer and member of the Pictorialism movement
- Alexia Sinclair (born 1976), fine-art photographer
- Ruby Spowart (1928–2024), photographs of the Australian outback in the 1980s and 1990s
- Robyn Stacey (born 1952), camera obscura photographs, evocative still life using historical collections

== Z ==
- Anne Zahalka (born 1957), photographer

== See also ==
- List of women photographers

== Bibliography ==
- Ennis, Helen. "1970s Photographic Practice: A Homogenous View?" Photofile 4, no. 1 (Autumn 1986): 12–15.
- Hall, Barbara and Jenni Mather. Australian Women Photographers: 1840–1960. Richmond: Greenhouse, 1986.
- Moore, Catriona. Indecent Exposures: Twenty Years of Australian Feminist Photography. St Leonards: Allen & Unwin, 1994.
- Newton, Gael. “The Movement of Women.” Art and Australia 33, no. 1 (Spring 1995): 62–9.
