= Sandy Edwards =

Australian photographer

- Born: Sandra Edwards; 1948 (age 77–78); Bluff, New Zealand
- Education: 1972-1973, 1972-1973 Slade School Fine Art, London Psychology Major, 1969 Faculty of Arts, University of Sydney, NSW
- Notable work: Paradise is a Place (Random House 1997), the CSR project (1978)
- Style: Documentary

Sandra Edwards (born 1948) is an Australian photographer. Edwards specialises in documentary photography and photographic curation. Born in Bluff, New Zealand in 1948 Edwards arrived in Sydney in 1961. Edwards was at the forefront of a group of progressive photographers in the 1970s and 80s who were driven to create documentary work that recorded social conditions and had the intent to change these conditions. Edwards' work largely drew from feminist ideals and the media's representation of women as well as the portrayal of Aboriginal communities in Australia.

== Education ==
Edwards majored in psychology in 1969 at the University of Sydney NSW. She went on to study film at the Slade School of Fine Art in London between 1972 and 1973.

== Feminism ==
Edwards, along with Helen Grace, Victoria Middleton and Lyn Silverman, formed the group "Blatant Image". Together they collaborated on photographic works that analysed the media's representation of women and created new works that contrasted these ideals.

Edwards' interest in the portrayal of women began when she was a teenager; collecting photos from magazines in the late 1960s, she began to see discrimination within the imagery. Another source was the movies of the 1930s and 1940s. Edwards was interested in these worlds of fantasy and in particular the construction of female sexual identity within them.

These influences pushed feminist views as a major point of her works, becoming most evident in A Narrative With Sexual Overtones (1983), which addressed the idea that no pleasure could be gained from the representation of women by the media, particularly film. The work was seen as a historical bridge between Marxist-feminist-semiotics and what would become feminist postmodernism further into the 1980s.

== Notable works ==
Edwards has participated in a wide array of photographic exhibitions throughout her career. Notable exhibitions include What’s in a face?: Points of View, AGNSW (2005-6); Close Relations, ACP (1998); and Shades of Light: Photography in Australia 1939-1988, NGA (1988). Her Sleep Late work of 2005-2006 was featured on a Melbourne billboard. Her body of work Paradise is a Place was highly acclaimed in the photographic community.

== The CSR project ==
The CSR photography project (1978) was a commissioned body of work that looked into a range of social issues including both women's roles in the workplace and cultural differences in working environments. A range of Australian photographers participated in the project, including Max Dupain, Ed Douglas, Bill Henson and Debra Phillips. Each artist took a different approach to their work.

Edwards demonstrated the tedious and repetitious nature of women's work through sequential prints of women performing their daily routine. The photographs were taken in a sugar refinery and were titled "192 cubes", "Sugar in the morning", "4:00pm time to go home...", "Sook is from Korea", "Beti and Maria", and "Beti is from Yugoslavia, Sook is from Korea." The titles and work itself emphasised the monotony of the workplace for women as well as the cultural challenges. Each of her works was compiled of a series of images printed as gelatin silver prints in black and white.

== Paradise is a Place ==
Paradise is a Place (1997) was a body of work published by Random House in collaboration with writer Gillian Mears. Edwards' photography was accompanied by Mears' non-fiction reminiscences of her childhood. The work looked into childhood on a broad spectrum. Edwards' photography portrayed the vulnerability and innocence of a young girl on the South Coast, New South Wales as she progresses from youth into adulthood. As well as being a published work, the images were exhibited as a solo exhibition printed as black and white silver gelatin prints displayed at the Royal Botanic Gardens, Sydney, Australia, 23 February through 31 March 1996.

== Current work ==
Sandy Edwards is still a practicing documentary photographer with over twenty years of experience in the field. She has also curated a number of major photographic exhibitions, including Sydney Airport 2000 Art Project, and Sydney Looking Forward; Art and about (2003).

In 2012, Edwards opened the ArtHere exhibition space in Redfern, which held seventeen exhibitions in its first year. She was previously curator at Stills Gallery in Sydney from 1991 until its closure in 2017, serving as co-director for fifteen years alongside Kathy Freedman. Stills Gallery was one of Australia’s leading commercial galleries dedicated to photography, representing artists including Trent Parke, Anne Ferran and William Yang.

Edwards' most recent exhibition titled "Indeniable" was a retrospective displayed at Stills Gallery in 2004. The exhibition was compiled of large Type C photographic prints. The series was shot in colour and the photographs were taken over a period of ten years. The exhibition gave a vibrant insight into Edwards' life and the lives of those around her.

== Recognitions ==
Edwards' work has received awards from the following organizations:

- Sleep Late, Yarras Edge Urban Project, MIRVAC Docklands, Melbourne - 2006
- Out of Time Grant for Welcome to Brewarrina - Australian Council Grant to Budapest with Indigenous Artist - 1991
- After 200 Years project - Australian Institute of Aboriginal Studies Commission - 1988
- Parliament House Photography Commission - 1986
- Grant for Blatant Image - Woman Photographers Group - 1981

== Exhibitions ==
=== Photographic ===
- The Challenged Landscape

20 April 2010 – 21 May 2010 - UTS Gallery, Sydney

- Double Exposure, 10 Contemporary Art Photographers

2010 - Viscopy Contemporary Artspace, Sydney

- Oculi: Terra Australia Incognita

2010 - Manly Art Gallery, Sydney

- Indelible

2004 - Stills Gallery, Sydney

- Australian Postwar Photodocumentary

2004 - Art Gallery of New South Wales, Sydney

- Momiji: An Autumn in Japan

2001 - Gallery East, Clovelly, NSW. This joint exhibition with Stephen Jones exhibited a set of photographic series of Jones' time in Japan.

- Skin: Women on Women (WOW)

2000 - Stills Gallery, Sydney

- First Love, in Close Relations

1999 - Australian Centre for Photography, Sydney

- Paradise is a Place

1996 - Royal Botanic Gardens, Sydney

- Inheritance

1996 - Australian Centre for Photography, Sydney

- Peer Pressure

1993 - Sydney, NSW - a slide show on notions of family in 'Writing Through the Lens' session at Sydney Writers Festival

- Brewarrina Photos with Boomalli artists

1992 - Vigado Gallery, Hungary

- Images of Men

1990 - L'Otel, Sydney

- Welcome to Brewarrina

1990 - Tin Sheds Gallery, University of Sydney, NSW. This joint exhibition with Joe Hurst was opened by Aboriginal artist, poet and activist Kevin Gilbert.

- Passion

1989 - Richard King Gallery, Sydney, NSW. This exhibition was part of the Bulletin Photography competition.

- More Than A Document, Art at Work

1988 - Roar Two, Melbourne

- Australian Photography

1988 - Gary Anderson Gallery, Sydney

- A Changing Relationship: Aboriginal Themes in Australian Art 1938-1988

1988 - S.H. Ervin Gallery, Sydney, NSW

- Shades of Light-Photography and Australia 1839 to 1988

1988 - Australian National Gallery, Canberra

- Living in the 70s: Australian Photographs

1987 - National Gallery of Australia, Canberra

- Image Perfect: Australian fashion Photography in the 1980s

1987 - Australian Centre for Photography, Sydney

- Parliament House Photography Commission: selected works

1986 - Drill Hall, Canberra

- CSR Photography Project (regional tour)

1985 - Queensland Art Gallery. The exhibitions were the regional tour for the CSR project.

- Three Photographers

1984 - Australian Centre for Photography, Sydney, NSW. This was a joint exhibition with Ann Graham and Grace Cochrane.

=== Curatorial ===
- Portraits

1991 - Stills Gallery, Sydney

- The Intimate Experience

1991 - Ivan Dougherty Gallery, Sydney, NSW

- The Nude in Photography 1860-1991

1991 - Josef Lebovic Gallery, Sydney
