= Lynne Roberts =

Lynne Roberts may refer to:

- Lynne Roberts (actress) (1922 – 1978), American film actress
- Lynne Roberts (basketball) (born 1975), American professional basketball coach
- Lynne Roberts-Goodwin (born 1954), Australian photographer, video and installation artist

== See also ==
- Lynn Roberts (1935–2017), American singer
