= Ellenbrook =

Ellenbrook may refer to:

- Ellenbrook, Western Australia
- Ellenbrook, Greater Manchester, United Kingdom
- Ellenbrook in Hatfield, Hertfordshire, United Kingdom

== See also ==
- Ellen Brook, a stream in Western Australia
- Ellen Brooks (born 1946), American photographer
- Ellensbrook, a property in Yebble, Western Australia
- Helen Brook (1907–1997), British family planning adviser
- Helen Brooks, pseudonym of Rita Bradshaw (born 1949), British romance novelist
