= Raskopoulos =

Raskopoulos is a Greek surname. Notable people with the surname include:

- Eugenia Raskopoulos (born 1959), Australian visual artist
- Peter Raskopoulos (born 1962), Australian association footballer
- Jordan Raskopoulos (born 1982), Australian comedian
- Steen Raskopoulos (born 1987), Australian comedian
