= Jon Rhodes =

Australian photographer (born 1947)

- Born: 1947 (age 78–79); Wagga Wagga, New South Wales, Australia
- Occupations: Photographer and writer

Jon Rhodes (born 1947) is an Australian photographer who has been described as a "pioneer" in "the development of a collaborative methodology between high art photography and [Australian] Aboriginal people living in remote communities". Rhodes' work is represented in all major Australian collections and at the J Paul Getty Museum, Los Angeles.

== Early life ==
Jon Rhodes was born at Wagga Wagga, New South Wales in 1947 and spent his early life in Brisbane, Queensland. After leaving St Peters Lutheran College in 1965 he was employed at Academy Photographers, and by the time he left for Sydney in early 1968, had photographed over 100 weddings! After unsuccessfully applying for a job as a cleaner at the University of New South Wales, he was offered instead a job as a photographer at T.E.R.C. (Tertiary Education Research Centre), a position he held until 1971. During that time Rhodes filmed Balmain (a documentary about the effects of containerisation on that inner-western suburb), directed by his former high school friend Kit Guyatt. Rhodes joined the Commonwealth Film Unit (renamed Film Australia and now Screen Australia), as an assistant cinematographer in 1972, and worked mainly on documentaries in Australia, Papua New Guinea and India. He became a cinematographer in 1974 and resigned from Film Australia in 1977 to concentrate on his still photography.

== Career ==
The earliest example of Rhodes' collaborative work with Aboriginal people is his first solo show Just another sunrise? in 1976. The exhibition contrasts the lifestyles of the Yolngu at Yirrkala with those led by the employees of Nabalco Pty Ltd in the town of Nhulunbuy. The Yolngu claimed that Nabalco's bauxite mining leases across the Gove Peninsula were in breach of their land rights and had instituted legal action in 1968 (Milirrpum v Nabalco Pty Ltd). Just another sunrise? comprises 17 panels, mainly black and white sequenced images, with the occasional colour. The introductory panel features Nabalco's rising sun logo (from where the exhibition's title originated), and the exhibition's room brochure provides a brief history of Yirrkala. The next seven panels deal with the desecration and the infrastructure of mining; the last nine panels document the "homeland movement", as the Yolngu establish their first settlements at Gurkaway and Djarrakpi, on the traditional clan lands around Blue Mud Bay. Rhodes uses the 19 kilometre-long conveyor belt that transports bauxite from the mine to the alumina refinery, as a motif to emphasise the cultural divide.

Just another sunrise? juxtaposes single photographs with sequences of images to convey a narrative. This approach by Rhodes, described as "steadfastly rejecting the idea that everything could be said in a single image", contrasts with the "decisive moment" approach of Cartier-Bresson. Rhodes adopted the compositional restrictions of cinematography, namely that the image composed through the view-finder of a movie camera was the image that appeared on-screen, and consequently his un-cropped still photographs are the result of always composing "full-frame", evidenced by the inclusion of the black 35mm frame-lines on all his photographic prints.

In 1977 Jenny Boddington curated a joint exhibition of the works of Jon Rhodes and of the landscape photographer Laurie Wilson at the National Gallery of Victoria. Rhodes' photographs, titled Australia, consisted of 26 pairs of black and white single images, from 1972 to 1975.

Rhodes was one of six photographers who were commissioned by the sugar refiner CSR Limited to photograph its refinery at Pyrmont for its centenary in 1978. In the subsequent exhibition, CSR Pyrmont Refinery Project, Rhodes' images emphasised "the repetitive and machine-dominated nature of the work". He was again commissioned by CSR in 1982, and featured in the exhibition CSR Hunter Valley Coal.

In 1986 Rhodes was commissioned by the Australian Institute of Aboriginal Studies (now AIATSIS) and contributed two chapters (Yaruman and Yuendumu) to After 200 Years: Photographic Essays of Aboriginal and Islander Australia Today. This publication was the work of 20 photographers who visited both urban, regional and remote Aboriginal communities between 1985 and 1987 in the course of the After 200 Years Project for the Australian Bicentennial Authority. Rhodes' Kundat Jaru mob exhibition grew out of the After 200 Years Project and features the unique combination of his and community members' photographs at Yaruman (Ringers Soak). It toured the State Galleries of Victoria, New South Wales, Queensland and Western Australia in 1991–1992.

In 1990 Rhodes spent five months at Kiwirrkura, 700 kilometres west of Alice Springs, where he again spent time with the Pintupi he'd first met in 1974, at Yayayi Bore, just west of Papunya. The subsequent exhibition, Whichaway?, the final in his trilogy of photographs from Aboriginal Australia, shows subtle refinement in “the art of stopping”, with his nuanced and understated sequences and series. Whichaway? toured Australia's eastern capitals, Alice Springs, Adelaide, and 20 regional galleries between 1998 and 2002, and was exhibited at the Kluge-Ruhe Gallery, University of Virginia, USA in 2004.

In 1992 Rhodes and the painter Carol Ruff were both inspired after reading The Arrernte Landscape of Alice Springs by anthropologist David Brooks, who documented how the infrastructure of Alice Springs had desecrated many of the Arrernte sacred sites – three species of Ancestral “caterpillar beings” formed much of the landscape on the eastern side, while “the activities of the wild dog” shaped many of the hills and valleys on the western side. Site Seeing, Rhodes’ and Ruff's collaborative exhibition consisting of 20 paired works, was shown at the Araluen Centre in Alice Springs in 1994, and toured to Brisbane, Cairns and Sydney in 1995–1997.

Inspired by Site Seeing, in 1994 Rhodes began searching for and photographing some of the "physical reminders of Aboriginal occupation in south-eastern Australia, where the impact of European settlement has been the longest and most intense". By the time Rhodes was awarded an H.C. Coombs Creative Arts Fellowship in 2006, he had photographed about 36 Aboriginal sites around Sydney, Melbourne, south-east Queensland and western New South Wales. The Fellowship enabled Rhodes to spend three months at the Australian National University in Canberra, intensively researching those 36 sites for his upcoming exhibition Cage of Ghosts, scheduled to open at the National Library of Australia in late 2007.

My Trip, the 2014 group exhibition (with Micky Allan and Max Pam), shown at the Art Gallery of New South Wales and curated by Judy Annear, featured 12 works by Rhodes, spanning the years 1974 to 1990, and were works selected mainly from Just another sunrise?, Kundat Jaru mob and Whichaway?

Over the next 10 years Rhodes wrote and published Cage of Ghosts, the book based on the exhibition. He concentrated on eight of the original 36 Aboriginal sites, examining “in vivid and fascinating detail the histories of an extraordinary cast of ethnologists, antiquarians, surveyors, anthropologists and artefact collectors, who were obsessed with documenting Aboriginal culture”. Rhodes “takes the reader on a journey from Sydney and the Eora rock engravings at Point Piper, Bondi, Allambie Heights and Mt. Ku-ring-gai, to ceremonially carved trees on a Kamilaroi bora ground near Collarenebri in north-western NSW. And from the Djab wurrung paintings of Bunjil and his two dingoes in Victoria, to the Ngunnawal scarred trees in the nation’s capital, Canberra”. He intermingles “these esoteric narratives with his personal observations”, and although “solves many of the intriguing puzzles he investigates”, Rhodes “raises the one big question yet to be answered – when will the fundamental truth of the 140-year-long Australian Frontier War finally be publicly acknowledged, and memorialised?” Cage of Ghosts won the 2019 NSW Premier's Community and Regional History Prize, the judges commenting that "Cage of Ghosts is a book of unusual originality. At once personal and scholarly, stories presented in words and in pictures, it is a subtle exploration of the way that thousands of years of Indigenous history are both visible, and hidden, in Australian landscapes. It is a formidably documented study with the power to reshape how we see the places where we live. Jon Rhodes evokes a multilayered country whose meanings have been shaped by the ancient cultures of First Nations peoples, but also by the complex, tragic history of settler colonialism."

Rhodes wrote and published the sequel Whitefella Way in 2022, and again takes the reader on eight vivid and fascinating journeys as he examines the intermingled histories of blackfellas and whitefellas at the Eora rock engravings on Grotto Point and Balls Head in Sydney. At the grave of Yuranigh near Molong, and the tumulus of the ‘Black Chief’ near Condobolin, both in Wiradjuri country. At Black Jimmy’s grave in the Bellingen Cemetery, in Gumbaynggirr country. At the Armidale Folk Museum, in Nganyaywana country. At the Bundjalung bora ground in Tucki Tucki General Cemetery near Lismore. And at the Gubbi Gubbi stone-walled fish trap on the Sunshine Coast in Queensland. In the final chapter Rhodes investigates the killing of Warlpiri, Kaytej, and Warumungu in the Northern Territory – the 1928 Coniston Massacre – and again asks when the fundamental truth of the 140-year-long Australian Frontier War will finally be acknowledged and memorialised by the Commonwealth of Australia?

Whitefella Way was shortlisted for the 2023 NSW Premier's Community and Regional History Prize, the judges commenting that the book "is a fascinating examination of Aboriginal–settler relations in the history of New South Wales. Beginning each chapter with a question, Rhodes expertly and sensitively guides the reader through a discussion of several significant events – ranging from the spearing of Captain Arthur Phillip by an Eora man at Collins Cove in 1790, to the first burials of Scottish Presbyterians near a Bundjalung bora ground in the 1880s, and the removal of Anaiwan carved trees from Boorolong in 1962 – to reveal how landscape and place can tell complex, intertwined histories. This multi-layered, multi-generational analysis offers a thought-provoking rendering of Aboriginal connection to Country, of colonists’ efforts to exert their influence over the land and its Indigenous inhabitants, and of frontier violence. Rhodes has cleverly blended archival research with interviews, artworks, maps and his own unique photographs in this stylishly written book. Often confronting, but always compelling, Whitefella Way is an innovative interpretation of the complex legacies of settler colonialism and of the preservation (or not) of Aboriginal cultural heritage in colonial and present-day New South Wales."
