= Mathew Jones =

Contemporary artist

Mathew Jones (born 1961) is an Australian-born contemporary artist who also took British citizenship in 2005.

Since the late ‘80s his work has dealt with gay identity and queer theory. He has held over 20 solo exhibitions in Australia, New York and Canada and been included in over 45 group exhibitions throughout all Australian states and in Montreal, Toronto, Vancouver, Winnipeg, Sao Paulo, Caracas, Copenhagen, New York and London. He was artist-in-residence at PS1 Museum, New York 1995/6, and the Acme Studios in London in 2001. He received an Australia Council Fellowship in 2003. A survey of his photographic work 1989 to 1994 was held at the Museum of Australian Photography in 2016.

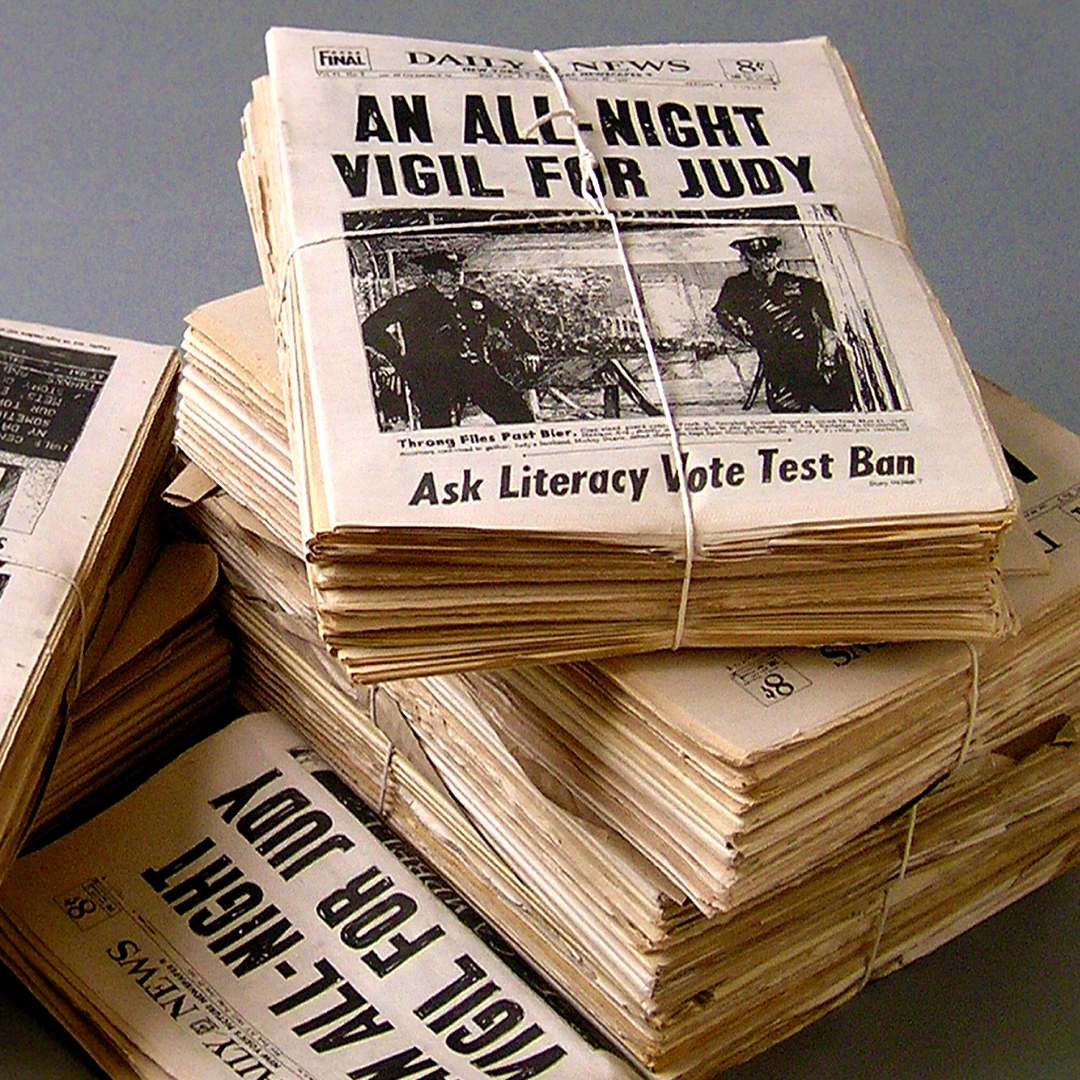
Mathew Jones, 'The New York Daily News on the day that became the Stonewall Riot, copied by hand from microfilm records' 1997.

Jones’ earliest work such as ‘Silence = Death’ (200 Gertude St, Melbourne; Artspace, Sydney; and the Institute of Modern Art, Brisbane throughout 1991) embraced notions of silence and refusal as political strategies in ways that pre-empt the interests of many younger queer artists today. ‘I Feel Like Chicken Tonight’ (Tolarno Galleries, Melbourne; Canberra Contemporary Art Space and Artspace, Sydney throughout 1995) highlighted the expulsion of NAMBLA from ILGA during the mainstreaming of gay politics. ‘Poof!’ (Australian Centre for Contemporary Art, Melbourne and the Art Gallery of NSW, 1993 and 1995) exploded the idea of a stable gay identity whilst ‘The New York Daily News …’ (pictured) pined for a time before Stonewall. As well as several public art projects, other projects of note include ‘A Place I’ve Never Seen’ (Australian Centre for Photography, Sydney; Museu de Arte Moderna, São Paulo; Optica, Toronto; and Ace Art, Winnipeg), and, ‘Mathew Jones / Simon Starling’ (Museum of Contemporary Art, Sydney 2002). The artist has seen significant critical attention in the 1990s, and his work is in the collections of Museum of Contemporary Art (Sydney), National Gallery of Victoria, Art Gallery of New South Wales, Queensland Art Gallery.

While work from the 1990s critiqued gay identity politics, recent works examine ways to connect with artists of the past. This differs from the approach taken in the exhibition 'RIOT' 1995.
