= Janina Green =

Australian photographic artist

Janina Green (born 1944 in Essen, Germany) is an Australian photographer recognised for her experimental and feminist approach to the medium. She migrated to Australia with her family in 1949, settling in Yallourn North, Victoria. This rural-industrial upbringing significantly influenced her artistic perspective, leading her to explore themes such as domesticity, motherhood, and identity in her work.

In the 1980s, Green began her experimental photographic practice, producing series such as Reproduction (1986) and Vacuum (1993), which have been noted for their contributions to feminist discourse and photographic innovation.

== Early life and education ==
Green pursued studies in Fine Arts at the University of Melbourne and then photography at Victoria College, Prahran, which as historian, founder and Director of the Centre for Contemporary Photography and Director of the Australian Centre for Photography, Deborah Ely notes; "from the early 1970s onwards...produced some of the country's most acclaimed practitioners, including Bill Henson, Carol Jerrems, Steve Lojewski, Rozalind Drummond, Janina Green and Christopher Koller among others." Green went on to specialise in printmaking at the Royal Melbourne Institute of Technology (RMIT).

== Selected solo exhibitions ==
- 1987: Reproduction, The Australian Centre for Photography, Sydney.
- 1989: Figureworks, Australian Centre for Photography, Sydney.
- 1993: Vacuum, Centre for Contemporary Photography, Melbourne.
- 1999, 13 October–13 November:‘ Plantation, Janina Green. Stills Gallery 36 Gosbell Street, Paddington, New South Wales
- 2000, 10 February–11 March: Janina Green photographs. Gippsland Art Gallery
- 2009: Where the Heart Is, Latrobe Regional Gallery, Morwell.
- 2010: Vacuum, Margaret Lawrence Gallery, Melbourne.
- 2012: Be Home Before Dark, Colour Factory, Melbourne.
- 2019: Studio Games, Bus Projects, Melbourne.

== Selected group exhibitions ==
- 1999, 2 April–2 May: Director’s Choice 1996-1998. La Trobe Regional Gallery

== Collections ==
Green's work is held in several public and private collections, including:

- National Gallery of Australia, Canberra
- National Gallery of Victoria
- Art Gallery of New South Wales
- Horsham Art Gallery
- Latrobe Regional Gallery
- Castlemaine Art Museum, Castlemaine

== Publications ==
=== Books by Green ===
- Reproduction, 2024.ISBN 978-0-6456947-4-1
- Life Drawing, 2022.
- A Country Practice, 2017.ISBN 978-0-9945170-3-6
- Blush: Photographs 1988 – 2010, 2011.ISBN 978-0-9579553-8-7
