= EX De Medici =

Australian artist (born 1959)

eX De Medici is an Australian artist whose works include installation art, painting, photography and drawing. Her works often deal with concepts of power and violence, and recurring motifs include skulls, helmets, guns and the swastika. She has exhibited widely across Australia and is included in the collections of the National Gallery of Australia (NGA), Canberra Museum and Gallery, Australian state galleries and in private collections. de Medici was an Artist Fellow at the CSIRO for more than a decade, was awarded a print making fellowship in 2006, and was an official war artist for The Regional Assistance Mission to Solomon Islands. She will be a featured artist in the NGA's major exhibition in 2020-2021, Know My Name, that will feature Australian women artists 1900 to today.

== Early life and education ==
The artist was born 12 April 1959 at Coolamon, in the Riverina district in south western New South Wales. but grew up in Canberra, ACT.

She attended the Canberra School of Art, combining performance, installation and photography in her fine art degree.

In 1988, while in Melbourne, she received her first tattoo. For the next 12 years she worked as a tattoo artist. She was awarded an Australian Council Overseas Development Grant and apprenticed to a tattoo artist in Los Angeles. During the 1990s she exhibited photographs and drawings of her tattoo work.

== Work ==
Active in the Canberra Arts Community, eX de Medici participated in a working group supporting the establishment of a Contemporary Art Space in Canberra, which held a public meeting at Gorman House in Braddon ACT in 1986. The invitation to the opening of the Canberra Contemporary Art Space notes "an exhibition of site specific works" including her work (July - August 1987).

In 1998 she saw botanical art paintings of Australian native flora painted in the early nineteenth century in watercolour. Seeing a connection between the detailed paintings and her own tattoo art, eX de Medici began painting in watercolour in a highly detailed style.

De Medici then lived for 18 months (1998 - 2000) on Norfolk Island working on a large watercolour painting containing details of flowers, fruit, porcelain and skulls which referenced her own family history. This work, entitled Blue [Bower/Bauer] 1998-2000, was purchased by the National Gallery of Australia in 2004 and will feature in the NGA's Know My Name exhibition in Canberra over 2020/21.

Back on the main land, she began work on a detailed painting of moths. She turned to Australia's science organisation CSIRO for help and for twelve years worked with them as an Artist Fellow.

In 2006 de Medici was awarded APW Collie Print Trust Printmaking Fellowship.

In 2009, she was an official war artist for the Regional Assistance Mission to Solomon Islands.

== Exhibitions ==
An untitled photocopy piece appeared at the Bitumen River Gallery exhibition "The Printed Image" (April–May 1986).

She was among artists appearing in the Australia & Regions Artists' eXchange (ARX87), Perth and Fremantle, Western Australia in September 1987. The ARX87 June Newsletter described her (as) "producing a work in two parts, one for Canberra and one for Perth, utilizing photocopiers and generating images in response to the Perth locality, placed in public spaces with regular changes."

Her "Scenes from an Ivory Tower" was exhibited in 1987 at "Utopia Nowhere", Gallery 111, Canberra. The work also appeared at The Canberra Contemporary Art Space (May–June 1988), and The Australian Centre for Photography (April–May 1989). The Australian Centre for Photography Exhibition Programme described the work as "A large scale work in composite laser photocopy...a long-term working title for a view from the Political Capital. The work addresses...the 'Violent Act', particularly those perpetrated by women on women, and the cultural positioning of the 'victor' and victim'."

Text works eX de Medici were performed at Galerie Constantinople, Queanbeyan in December 1988.

A colour screenprint titled Alexis says desire drules, Ok was included in "Posters - the politics of life" at aGOG in Canberra in April 1989.

Her painting Cure For Pain was a major donation to the Australian War Memorial in 2017, made by Erika Krebs-Woodward through the Australian Government's Cultural Gifts Program.

In 2020-21 her work, The wreckers, was shown in Part One of the exhibition, "Know my name: Australian women artists 1900 to now" at the National Gallery of Australia.
