= Diena Georgetti =

Australian painter

Diena Georgetti (born 1966) is an Australian contemporary artist born in Alice Springs, Australia and currently based in Melbourne, Australia. Her works have been displayed in galleries across Australia, including the National Gallery of Victoria, the Institute of Modern Art in Brisbane and the Art Gallery of South Australia. She was selected for inclusion in the National Gallery of Australia's Know My Name exhibition 2021-22.

In 2021, her 2020 painting Ampersand was awarded the Geelong Contemporary Art Prize.

== Career ==
Georgetti held her first individual and group exhibitions in Brisbane in 1986.

In 1989, she received critical attention for her early series of blackboard paintings after they were exhibited in the Institute of Modern Art, and later at the Biennale of Sydney in 1992. The blackboards featured words or phrases scrawled across the blackboards, sometimes elegantly and sometimes chaotically and awkwardly, and were exhibited together in clusters of works. The words Georgetti used were German and Latinate, and often resembled English words that were suggestive in nature.

In 2008, Georgetti was the focus of major survey exhibition, The Humanity of Abstract Painting. The exhibition displayed a diverse range of Georgetti's works from 1988 to 2008, taken from various public and private collections from throughout Australia and New Zealand.

== Style ==
Georgetti's style has been described as part idealist and part surrealist and represents a diverse array of artistic styles.
