= Tom Blachford =

Australian photographer

- Born: 1987 (age 38–39); Melbourne, Australia
- Known for: Photographer

Tom Blachford (born 1987) is an Australian photographer born in Melbourne, Victoria. Blachford works in architectural and fine art photography.

Blachford has exhibited in Australia, Europe and the US and his works have been seen in Architectural Digest, Vanity Fair, Monocole, i-D.

== Work ==
Midnight Modern is a series capturing urban and suburban architectural environments including Palm Springs, Tokyo.

Centro Verso combines the medium of photography, city shots of Melbourne, with CAD software, 3D printing and microprocessor programming.

Influorescence is a collection of work created with fellow fine art photographer Kate Ballis with botanical themes, exhibited at Melbourne's Gallerysmith in November 2023.

Nihon Noir is a series of works examining Metabolist architecture of Japan.

== Books ==
- Midnight Modern: Palm Springs Under the Full Moon (released 2017, powerHouse Books) ISBN 978-1576878347
- Nihon Noir (released 2026, powerHouse Books) ISBN 978-1648230837
