= Robert Cumming (artist) =

American artist (1943–2021)

- Born: October 7, 1943; Worcester, MA
- Died: December 16, 2021 (aged 78); Desert Hot Springs, CA
- Education: Massachusetts College of Art, Boston, BFA; University of Illinois, Champagne-Urbana, MFA
- Known for: Photography, Painting, Sculpture, Printmaking
- Movement: Conceptualism
- Awards: National Endowment for the Arts grants (1973, 1974, 1983) Guggenheim Memorial Fellowship, (1980-81)
- Website: https://robertcummingartist.com

Robert Hugh Cumming (October 7, 1943 – December 16, 2021) was an American painter, sculptor, photographer, and printmaker best known for his photographs of conceptual drawings and constructions, which layer meanings within meanings, and reference both science and art history.

== Early life ==
Cumming grew up just outside of Boston, MA. He earned a BFA in 1965 from Massachusetts College of Art in Boston and an MFA in 1967 at the University of Illinois at Urbana-Champaign.

== Career ==
Untitled watercolor on paper by Robert H. Cumming, 1986

His first teaching position was at the University of Wisconsin–Milwaukee, where he was involved with mail art, an early conceptual art movement that conferred art status on items sent through the postal system. In 1970, Cumming moved to southern California to lecture on photography, and in 1974, he started teaching at the University of California, Los Angeles. In 1978, Cumming moved back to New England, where he continued to teach and make art.

== Work and themes ==
=== Photography ===
Cumming studied photography in graduate school, studying with Art Sinsabaugh. In the beginning he used photography as a means of documenting sculptural works, but eventually “the works became as much about photographic documentation as about the objects.”

== Exhibitions ==
=== Solo exhibitions ===
- Robert Cumming: The Secret Life of Objects, the George Eastman Museum and the California Museum of Photography, UC Riverside, 2019–2020.
- Split-Second Misreads: Robert Cumming and the Fabrication of Illusion, the Benton Museum of Art at Pomona College, February 20 - June 27, 2027.

=== Group exhibitions ===
- Mirrors and Windows: American Photography since 1960, Museum of Modern Art, NY, July 26 - October 2, 1978.
- Art by Telephone, Museum of Contemporary Art, Chicago, IL, November 1 - December 14, 1969.
- 9 Artists/9 Urban Spaces, Walker Art Center, Minneapolis, MN, September 1 - October 5, 1970.
- Minor White, Robert Heinecken, Robert Cumming: Photograph as Metaphor, Photograph as Object, Photograph as Document of Concept, California State University, Long Beach, October 8 - November 12, 1973.
- Picture Puzzles, Museum of Modern Art, New York, NY, August 12 - November 16, 1975.
- Whitney Biennial 1977: Contemporary American Art, February 19-April 3, 1977.

== Collections ==
=== Institutional representation ===
Cumming is represented in the permanent collections of various major art museums, including:

- The Milwaukee Art Museum
- The Museum of Modern Art, New York
- The Baltimore Museum of Art
- The Art Institute of Chicago
- The Dallas Museum of Art
- The Museum of Fine Arts, Houston
- The Denver Art Museum
- The George Eastman Museum, Rochester
- The Minneapolis Institute of Arts
- The Whitney Museum of American Art, New York
- The Walker Art Center, Minneapolis
- The San Francisco Museum of Modern Art
- The J. Paul Getty Museum, Los Angeles
- The Los Angeles County Museum of Art
- Honolulu Museum of Art Spalding House (formerly The Contemporary Museum, Honolulu).

== Personal life and death ==
Cumming died on December 16, 2021, at the age of 78 from complications of Parkinson’s disease.

== Sources ==
- Baltimore Museum of Art, 14 American photographers: Walker Evans, Robert Adams, Lewis Baltz, Paul Caponigro, William Christenberry, Linda Connor, Cosmos, Robert Cumming, William Eggleston, Lee Friedlander, John R. Gossage, Gary Hallman, Tod Papageorge, Garry Winogrand, Baltimore, Baltimore Museum of Art, 1975.
- MIT List Visual Arts Center, Three on technology: New Photographs by Robert Cumming, Lee Friedlander, Jan Groover, Cambridge, Mass., MIT List Visual Arts Center, 1988.
- Turnbull, Betty, Rooms, Roments Remembered, Robert Cumming, Michael Davis, Roland Reiss, Richard Turner, Bruce Williams, Newport Beach, Calif., Newport Harbor Art Museum, 1978.
- Yager, David, Frames of reference, photographic paths: Zeke Berman, George Blakeley, Eileen Cowin, John Craig, Robert Cumming, Darryl Curran, Fred Endsley, William Larson, Bart Parker, Victor Schrager, the Starn twins, Baltimore, Visual Arts Dept., University of Maryland, Baltimore County, 1989.
