= William Yang (photographer) =

Australian photographer (born 1943)

- Born: 1943 (age 82–83); Mareeba, Queensland
- Education: Architecture
- Known for: Photography

William Yang (born 1943), formerly known as Willy Young, is an Australian social history photographer, playwright, artist, and filmmaker. Yang's photography and performances span over 50 years and document the uncharted growth and influence of Sydney's gay subculture from the 1970s through to the HIV/AIDS epidemic of the 1980s and 1990s and beyond. Through the media of photography and performance Yang also explores his own ethnicity as a Chinese Australian and the intersection of his ethnic background and sexuality.

== Early life and education ==
William Yang was born in 1943 in Mareeba, North Queensland. He is a second-generation Chinese Australian.

Yang studied architecture at University of Queensland, where his interest in photography took shape. Photos of architectural detail, theatrical performance and people became the content that later defined his work, particularly performance and people. He dropped out shortly after graduating in 1968.

He was initially known as Willy Young.

== Career ==
=== Early career ===
In 1969 Yang relocated from Brisbane to Sydney, abandoned architecture studies and joined an experimental theatre company, Performance Syndicate, as a playwright. In the early 1970s, inspired by the Stonewall riots in New York, Yang came out as a gay man. Photography however became his metier rather than writing and actors were keen to include his photographic portraits in their portfolios. He also made some films in the early 1970s.

While celebrity and fashion fascinated Yang, photojournalism began to preoccupy his interest. The direction of photojournalism led him to commissions with magazines hungry for images to fill their social pages. Although this paid a living, Yang considered himself more an artist than a commercial photographer. At the same time photography was increasingly recognised as an artform, its significance reinforced in Sydney with the opening of the Australian Centre for Photography (ACP) in November 1974. His first exhibition at ACP was in 1977, Sydneyphiles, consisting of celebrity social photos and (more controversial at the time) images of the gay community.

Yang became increasingly engrossed with documenting the gay subculture surrounding Oxford Street in Sydney and switched from earning a living with commercial magazines to earning commissions from the gay press . The trajectory of gay culture at this time was visibly exuberant: the Gay Mardi Gras (later the Sydney Gay and Lesbian Mardi Gras) a hallmark of this self-assertion; the growing political activism around civil rights; and the ravages of the HIV/AIDS epidemic were all captured by Yang.

Yang says of this time that there was an almost frenzied party milieu especially evident in the large RAT and Sleaze Balls that belied a sense of fatalism with the HIV/AIDS epidemic. Yang has said of this time: I see myself as a photographic witness to our time. I feel compelled to perform these slide shows as social rituals to unburden myself of the things I have seen.

He changed his surname from Young to Yang in 1983.

=== Mid career ===
Documentation of the gay community brought into sharp focus his little explored ethnicity as a Chinese Australian. Embracing his Chinese ethnicity and heritage for the first time, Yang took lessons on Taoism, travelled to China and then eventually back to his home town of Dimbulah in North Queensland. This exposed Yang to the beauty of the harsh Australian landscape, entwined with recognition and pride in his Chinese heritage. The face of Buddha (1989), his first art performance, included slide projections and monologues with over-written photographic images and became the form of expression he preferred over pure photographic exhibitions. In over-writing his photographic images, Yang became increasingly aware of the importance of text in communicating and personalising ideas, of placing himself within the story which could never be objective.

Inspired by the autobiographical monologues of Spalding Gray, Yang embarked on an international tour of his work Sadness, a 'monologue with slide projections', which was also developed as a film, winning several awards including the 1999 AWGIE Award for best screenplay, and best documentary selected by the Australian Film Critics Circle Award. Increasingly known for documentaries including My Generation (2008 – stories of friends, sexuality and identity) Blood Links (1999 - stories about the Chinese in Australia including his family) and Friends of Dorothy (1998 – stories around the acceptance of sexuality, death and mourning) stemming from original performances, Grehan and Scheer contend that his performance pieces became a form of self-portraiture. Produced by Felix Media, these three films are available on DVD.

=== Later career ===
In the last decade, Yang has worked closely with Contemporary Asian Australian Performance (CAAP) and in collaboration with Annette Shun Wa has been instrumental in supporting Asian Australian creatives including hip hop musicians Joal Ma and James Mangohig (In between two).

== Works ==
Sadness: A monologue with slides (1999) begins with Yang's Chinese Australian heritage and is also an account of the slow death of Yang's friends Nicolaas and Allan. Its generation began when between 1988 and 1992, Yang realised that he had attended more wakes than parties.

There are two volumes of Yang's diaries which document his photographic work - Diaries: a retrospective exhibition: 25 years of social personal and landscape photography which is based on an exhibition curated by the State Library of NSW in 1998; and Sydney Diary 1974-1984 which is organised thematically with text by Yang.

A comprehensive bibliography and list of Yang's works can be found at AustLit

== Legacy ==
Yang's archive consists of over half a million images covering almost 50 years of documenting people, places and social change.

Grehan and Scheer, discuss how Yang's work can be assessed in an age of digital self-regard or the 'selfie'. They suggest Yang's work resides in 'memory...reflection and... (self) recognition'. Grehan and Scheer maintain that Yang's work is an antidote to the instantaneous production of the 'selfie' and is a form of 'slow media' associated with documentarians. Although Yang also embraces digital media such as Facebook and microblogging, he still adheres to a sense of curation and narrative. Yang sees his digital storytelling as a podcasting.

Yang's chronicle of the HIV/AIDS epidemic in the 1980s and 1990s depicting images of close friends in the final stages of death is, according to Helen Ennis different from early nineteenth and twentieth century post mortem photography. Ennis also contrasts his publicly exhibited work to more recent depictions of death and dying using digital technology held privately by surviving loved ones. She maintains that his work was done at a time when the urgency surrounding the HIV/AIDS epidemic within a specific demographic was both personal and political:—

Yang's work was vitally important in its nuanced and dignified engagement with dying and death; combining black-and-white documentary photographs of his friends with his own personal, hand written narrative

A retrospective exhibition at the Queensland Art Gallery in 2021 (Seeing and Being Seen) chronicles the portraits, the parties, the politics, the personal and the natural.

In 2023, Yang was recognised as a Rainbow Champion as part of Sydney World Pride 2023 in recognition of his photographic career in documenting and celebrating LGBTQ+ life and culture in Australia.

== Recognition and awards ==
Many portraits of and by Yang are held by the National Portrait Gallery in Canberra, including self-portraits.

Awards and honours include:

- 1989 Honorary Doctorate of Letters, University of Queensland
- 1993 Higashikawa-cho International Photographic Festival award of International Photographer of the Year
- 1999 AWGIE Award (Documentary (Public Broadcast)) for Sadness: A monologue with slides (1999)
- 2007 Portrait of Geoffrey Rush (created 2006), finalist in the National Photographic Portrait Prize 2007
- 2023 Rainbow Champion, Sydney World Pride
- 2023 Lifetime Achievement Award, Sydney Theatre Company
- 2025 President's Award, AIDS Council of New South Wales (ACON)

== Oral history ==
The National Library of Australia hold a number of oral history interviews with William Yang, spanning from 1993 to 2019.
