= Queensland Centre for Photography =

Defunct Australian photography centre in Queensland 2004–2014

Coordinates: 27.477075°S 153.016788°E

The Queensland Centre for Photography (QCP) was an artist-run photographic institution that operated from 2004 until 2014. The Board, at a general meeting of the QCP held on 17 April, decided unanimously to close its Brisbane exhibition venue, following the withdrawal of core funding announced October 2013 by the Queensland state government.

Previously at 33 Oxford Street, Bulimba, Queensland, Australia, it moved to a newly built venue on the corner of Cordelia and Russell Streets in South Brisbane, Queensland. The Queensland Centre for Photography was regarded as one of the leading photographic institutions in Australia, its program included exhibitions, publications, international projects and the Queensland Festival of Photography. The annual exhibition program consisted of approximately 44 individual shows during 11 exhibition periods.

== Publications ==
- Perception : The Daryl Hewson Photographic Collection, (2005) ISBN 0-9757720-0-7
- Marian Drew : Photographs + Video Works, foreword by Geoffrey Batchen; essays by Caroline Jordan, et al. (2006) ISBN 0-9757720-1-5
- Ray Cook Photographs : Diary of a Fortunate Man, foreword by Maurice Ortega; essays by Alasdair Foster, et al. (2011) ISBN 0-9757720-3-1
- Martin Smith : Photographs, essays by Karra Rees and Charles Robb (2011) ISBN 0-9757720-4-X
- Joachim Froese : Photographs 1999–2008, foreword by Gordon Craig; essays by Timothy Morrell and Andrea Domesle (2011) ISBN 0-9757720-5-8
- Renata Buziak : Afterimage, foreword by Lyle Rexer; essay by Victoria Garnons-Williams (2011) ISBN 0-9757720-6-6
