= Grant Mudford =

Australian photographer

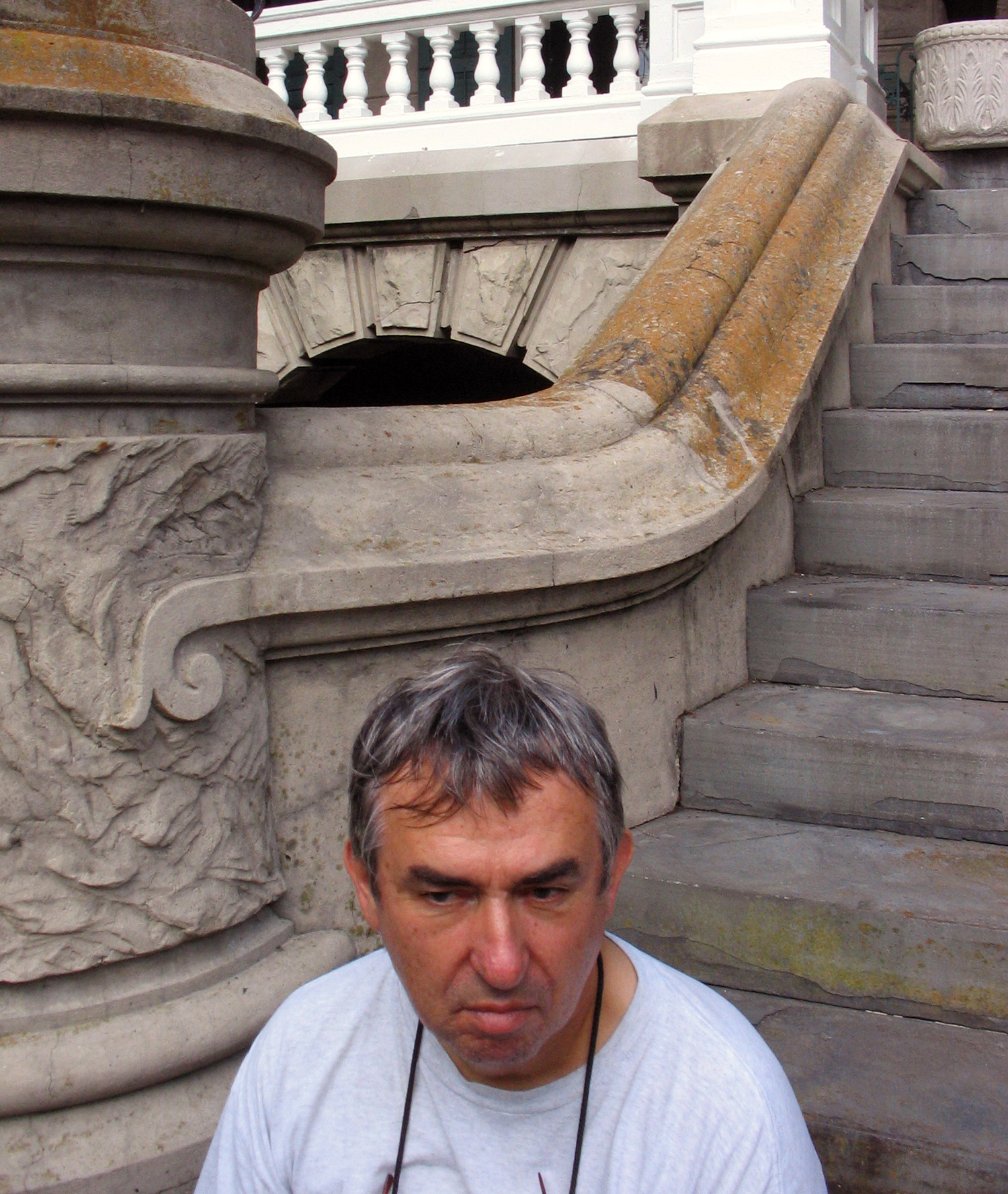
Grant Mudford in Galveston, Texas.

Grant Mudford (born 1944 in Sydney), is an Australian photographer.

== Life and work ==
From 1963 to 1964 Mudford studied architecture at the University of New South Wales, Sydney. From 1965 to 1974, he established a commercial photography studio in Sydney and worked widely in advertising, fashion, magazine editorial and theatre. He also worked on numerous short films as a cinematographer. In 1971 he won a special award for lighting, at the Australian Film Awards, for 'The Widow.’

Mudford began exhibiting as a still photographer from 1972, firstly in Sydney, Australia. In 1974 and 1977 he was awarded a Visual Arts Board Travel Grant, from the Australia Council for the Arts, with a program of intensive travel and work in the United States. He moved to Los Angeles permanently in 1977.

In 1980 Mudford secured a Photographers' Fellowship from the National Endowment for the Arts. From 1983 he undertook editorial assignments for American and international publications in the US and abroad, including: Harper's Bazaar, Esquire, Fortune, Westways, House and Garden, Architectural Digest, Interiors, Vanity Fair, Architectural Record, Progressive Architecture, Traveller, L.A. Style, Los Angeles Times, New York Times, Architecture, Los Angeles Magazine, Travel & Leisure, and Interview.

Mudford was the subject of episode six of the television series 'Visual Instincts' (Artemis International, 1989).

In 1990 and 1991 Mudford photographed extensively throughout the US for an exhibition of the work of architect Louis Kahn, organised by Museum of Contemporary Art, Los Angeles. In 2005, a photograph of Phillips Exeter Academy Library, designed by Louis I. Kahn, was one of twelve photographs selected for the commemorative stamp program.

== Major exhibitions ==
- Mudford has been exhibiting regularly in Australia, the United States and abroad since 1972.
- 1979: Solo Exhibition at Hirshhorn Museum and Sculpture Garden, Smithsonian Institution, Washington D.C. (catalogue)
- 1983: 'A Decade of Australian Photography 1972–82,' Australian National Gallery, Canberra, Australia
- 1989: Solo Exhibition at Barbara Mann Performing Arts Hall, Edison College, Ft. Myers, FL; curated by Robert Rauschenberg.
- 1991 and 1992: Photographs featured in 'Louis I. Kahn: In the Realm of Architecture,’ organised by The Museum of Contemporary Art, Los Angeles. The exhibition travelled to Philadelphia Museum of Art; Centres Georges Pompidou, Paris; The Museum of Modern Art, New York; The Museum of Modern Art, Gunma, Japan; The Museum of Contemporary Art, Los Angeles; Kimbell Art Museum, Fort Worth, TX; Wexner Center for the Arts, Columbus, Ohio.
- 1993: ‘Not Painting,’ curated by John Baldessari and Alma Ruiz from the Permanent Collection, The Museum of Contemporary Art, Los Angeles.
- 1995: 'On The Edge: Australian Photographers of the 70's,’ from the collection of the Australian National Gallery: San Diego Museum of Art, San Diego, CA
- 1996: 'Precisionist Poetics: Urban Abstraction from the Seventies,' Laurence Miller, New York, NY
- 1996: 'Just Past: The Contemporary in MOCA's Permanent Collection, 1975–1996,' Museum of Contemporary Art, Los Angeles, CA
- 1996: 'Long Beach Odyssey: A Photography Survey,' University Art Museum, California State University, Long Beach, CA
- 1996: 'A Celebration of 25 Years of Light Gallery,' International Center of Photography Midtown, New York, NY
- 1997: 'Last Chance For Eden,' Dansk Arkitektur Center, Copenhagen, Denmark
- 1997: 'Ocean View,' University of California Riverside/California Museum of Photography, Riverside, CA
- 1999: Milwaukee Art Center, Milwaukee, WI
- 2000: 'Departures: 11 Artists at the Getty,' J. Paul Getty Museum, Los Angeles, CA
- 2000: Mercury Gallery, Boston, MA
- 2001: 'What's Shakin': New Architecture in Los Angeles,' Museum of Contemporary Art, Los Angeles, CA
- 2001: 'The Architecture of R.M. Schindler,' Museum of Contemporary Art, Los Angeles, CA
- 2002: 'Ocean View: The Depiction of Southern California Lifestyle,' The Autry Museum of Western Heritage, Los Angeles, CA
- 2004: 'Transfictions: Jack Butler, Eileen Cowin and Grant Mudford,' USC Fisher Gallery, Los Angeles, CA
- 2006: College of Fine Art, Cypress College, Cypress, CA
- 2006–2007: 'Modern Photographs: The Machine, the Body and the City,' Miami Art Museum, Miami, FL (catalogue)
- 2009: 'Love Letter to Las Vegas,' Michelle C. Quinn Fine Art Advisory, Las Vegas, NV
- 2010: 'The Recast Landscape,' Gallery 27, Brooks Institute, Santa Barbara, CA
- 2011: 'Street Sight,' Armory Center for the Arts, Pasadena, CA
- 2011: 'New Faces of the Collection,' Santa Barbara Museum of Art, Santa Barbara, CA
- 2011: Rosamund Felsen Gallery, Santa Monica, CA

== Sources ==
- Michael Duncan (2003) “Grant Mudford at Rosamund Felsen," Art in America, September: 131-2.
- Editor (1977) ‘Grant Mudford – American Photographs 1975-6,’ Creative Camera, April: 128–135.
- Gloria Gerace, ed. & Grant Mudford (2003) Symphony: Frank Gehry’s Walt Disney Concert Hall, Harry N. Abrams, Inc.
- Lisa Lyons & Grant Mudford (2000) Departures: 11 Artists at the Getty, J. Paul Getty Museum
- Grant Mudford (1979) Grant Mudford, photographs: Hirshhorn Museum and Sculpture Garden, Smithsonian Institution, Smithsonian Institution Press
- Grant Mudford (1986) Grant Mudford, Gallery Min
- Max Pam, ed. (1989) 'Grant Mudford', Visual Instincts: Contemporary Australian Photography, AGPS: 121–147.
- Kathryn Smith & Grant Mudford (2001) Schindler House, Harry Abrams
- Judith Scheine (2001) "R.M. Schindler," Phaidon Press Ltd., London
- Alfonso Perez-Mendez (2002) "Craig Ellwood: In the Spirit of the Time," Gustavo Gili, Barcelona
- (1999) "2G-Craig Ellwood: 15 Houses," Gustavo Gili, Barcelona
- Joshua Chuang (2008) "First Doubt: Optical Confusion in Modern Photography, Selections from the Allan Chasanoff Collection," Yale University Art Gallery, New Haven, CT (catalogue)
- (2008) "Great Houses of Texas," Abrams, New York
- (2008) "Michael Asher," Santa Monica Museum of Art, Los Angeles (catalogue)
