= Cherine Fahd =

Australian photographer and academic

Cherine Fahd is an Australian artist who works in photography and video performance. She is also Associate Professor in Visual Communication at the University of Technology, Sydney, Australia and has published in academic journals, photographic and art publications, and in news and media. Her work has been shown in Australia, Israel, Greece and Japan. She has received numerous grants, and has been awarded residencies in India and in Sydney at Carriageworks.

== Early life and education ==
Fahd was born in Sydney Australia in 1974, where her grandfather and his brothers migrated from Lebanon in the 1950s. At age 11 her teacher took her class to an exhibition at the Art Gallery of New South Wales. She says that from then on, her focus was on art, and she often faked dentist appointments to skip school and go to the gallery.

She studied at the College of Fine Arts at the University of New South Wales (now the UNSW Art and Design) and received her Bachelor of Arts degree in 1996. She originally studied painting, but after art school turned to photography to capture moments and actions. She became professionally active in the 1990s.

In 2003, she completed a master's degree of fine arts at the University of New South Wales College of Fine Arts, still in the field of painting, before photography became her full focus.

She was awarded a PhD from Monash University in 2016 and is an Associate Professor and Director of Photography at the University of Technology, Sydney.

She continues to work in Sydney, in a backyard studio she shares with her artist husband, children and dog.

== Works ==
Fahd's photography first focused on spontaneous gestures, and today addresses the difference between staged and spontaneous images. She also asks questions about why people pose for photographs. Some of her work humorously addresses the concepts of identity, race, appearance and concealment.

"I am interested in the way photography, in terms of portraiture, presents an appearance, how we appear to others. This appearance is a signifier of so many things such as race for example. This in and of itself points to photography’s history as a tool used to classify people."

Fahd has often worked in series. One of her first was about noses; the subjects' noses were wrapped in bandages as if they had had nose surgery. Other series shown since 2000 include Sleepers, Camouflage, and National Types of Beauty.

In 2003–2004, while in Paris, Fahd captured a series of individuals against a stone wall. There was a heat wave and the city installed sprinklers, and the photographs show various reactions.

In 2011, at the Australian Centre for Contemporary Art in Melbourne, Australia, Fahd led a program to share her fears and asked visitors to share theirs. She then created posters of text to present the fears.

For Shadowing Portraits (2014–2015) Fahd asked practitioners working in photography to sit for portraits. She asked each subject to strike a pose and then copied the pose behind them. In essence, she was hiding herself as the photograph was of herself, hidden by the sitter. The series was part of her PhD work.

In 2016–2017 Fahd produced the Series You Look like..., a series of photographs of 12 men with beards. Two were of her brothers, often asked by their mother to shave off their beards because, as Lebanese men, they looked like terrorists. Other photographs were of men of different heritage. Fahd's series raises questions about how we judge people by their appearances.

In 2018 Fahd was one of the artists invited into The National: New Australian Art (a Biennial presented by the Art Gallery of NSW, the Carriageworks, and the Museum of Contemporary Art, Sydney), Fahd exhibited at Carriageworks a series of photographs adapted from her family archive called Apókryphos, a Greek word meaning secret or unknown. The photos, originally taken in 1975, show the grief of a family funeral as well as a portrait of the Lebanese-Australian community of the 1970s. Each photo has been annotated by Fahd with both an explanation, and an expression of her feelings. That text is essential to the works. The funeral occurred when Fahd was two years old. The photographs and annotations make public visual and private expressions of grief. The viewer becomes involved. The deceased is never seen, only the mourners who are individually identified in the annotations. As the series progresses, her own comments became increasingly personal until she began to use children's intimate names for grandmother, the widow. Following its presentation at Carriageworks, the series was acquired for the collection of the Art Gallery of New South Wales.

== Publications ==
Fahd has had two books published of her work by M.33 Melbourne, A Portrait is a Puzzle (2017) and Apókryphos (2019) which won the Australia New Zealand Photobook Award.

Her writing has been published on The Conversation, ABC News and SBS and academic journals.

== Grants and awards ==
- Fahd received grants from the Australia Council for the Arts in 1999, 2002, 2004, 2007, 2014, 2016 and 2018.
- 2003: Granted the Moya Dyring Studio from the Art Gallery of New South Wales which provides a two-month residency in a studio apartment in Paris.
- 2004: Fahd won the Josephine Ulrick and Win Schubert Foundation for the Arts Photography Award.
- 2005: the NSW Women and Arts fellowship from Arts NSW (New South Wales).
- 2010: The National Photography Prize, presented bi-annually by the MOMA Art Foundation that supports the Murray Art Museum (MOMA), Albury, Australia. The prize was for Hiding – Self Portraits (2009–2010).
- 2018: Awarded the Asialink Creative Exchange residency to Varanasi, India. While there, she focused on how the expressions of the human face signal identity.
- 2019: Selected for The National: New Australian Art. The biennial National exhibition is a partnership between the Art Gallery of New South Wales (AGNSW), Carriageworks and the Museum of Contemporary Art Australia (MCA).
- 2019: Awarded artist in residence at The Clothing Store at Carriageworks.

== Collections ==
- Art Gallery of South Australia
- Haifa Museum of Art, Israel
- Museum of Photographic Arts, San Diego, California
- National Gallery of Australia
- National Gallery of Victoria
