= Judith Eglington =

Canadian photographer

Judith Eglington (born 1945) is a Canadian photographer and filmmaker.

Eglington attended the Ecole des Beaux Arts in Montreal, receiving a diploma in 1961.

Her work is included in the collections of the National Gallery of Canada and the Center for Creative Photography in Tucson, Arizona.
