= Penny Tweedie =

British photojournalist

- Born: Penelope Anne Tweedie; 30 April 1940; Hawkhurst, Kent, England
- Died: 14 January 2011 (aged 70); Hawkhurst, Kent, England
- Education: Guildford School of Art
- Occupation: Photojournalist
- Years active: 1961–2009
- Children: 1
- Awards: Walkley Award

Penelope "Penny" Anne Tweedie (30 April 1940 – 14 January 2011) was an English photojournalist who is noted for her work with the Aboriginal peoples in Arnhem Land in the late 1970s. Born into a farming family she went to the Guildford School of Art in spite of her parents’ opposition. Tweedie's first job came with Queen in 1961 after it asked her college to send their best performing student to them. She left two years later to go freelance and set herself assignments in which she covered various newsworthy stories.

She and others travelled to East Bengal during the 1971 East Pakistan crisis but were arrested by the Indian Army after they were mistaken for spies. Tweedie was embroiled in controversy when she refused to photograph prisoners accused to being collaborators when she noticed they were to be bayoneted to death for the assembled foreign media.

She was asked by the BBC to photograph the filming of a programme called Explorers: The Story of Burke and Wills in Alice Springs in 1975 and later became fascinated by the lives and work of the Aboriginal people. Her work was widely exhibited and she won the Walkley Award for photojournalism in 1999. Tweedie regularly returned to the United Kingdom and continued to be kept busy until she took her own life in early 2011.

== Biography ==
=== Early life ===
Penelope Anne Tweedie was born on 30 April 1940 at the Fowlers nursing home in Hawkhurst in Kent. She was the oldest of three children and the sole daughter to the farmer John Lawrence Tweedie, who was serving as an aircraftman in the Royal Air Force Volunteer Reserve, and his first wife Anne Ellinor née Wilson. At the time of the registration of Tweedie's birth, Anne was living in Tuckness with her parents. Tweedie was educated at Benenden School. She wanted to become a photographer as she was impressed by the work of Henri Cartier-Bresson but her parents voiced their opposition to her career choice but nevertheless went to Guildford School of Art to study the subject from 1958 to 1961.

=== Career ===
Upon graduating from art school, Tweedie found employment at Queen in 1961, a magazine covering London's young smart set, after it asked the Guildford School of Art to send their best performing student to them. Among her subjects during this time was about the painter David Hockney while he was in his final year at the Royal College of Art. The Telegraph magazine discovered in one edition that Tweedie had taken almost all the photos in that week's edition and bylined the story under the pseudonym "Wendy Patien" to avoid being embarrassed. She left Queen after two years to go freelance. Tweedie set her own assignments which concerned topics such as homelessness, teenage pregnancy and alcoholism. She eventually was able to sell her photographs in Fleet Street.

Tweedie's breakthrough came in 1966 when she worked in an unpaid job with the charity Shelter and her photographs were used in the media. Her first acclaimed work was her black-and-white photographs of Glasgow's poor quality post-war housing conditions. She was offered employment at the Daily Express but this was later withdrawn when its National Union of Journalists chapel father declared that a woman being sent to the scene of a rail accident or something similar would not be possible as it was feared she would faint.

By the late 1960s Tweedie became known as a "swinging London’" photographer as she was seen walking a black Pekingese dog and drove a MGB convertible. She set herself further assignments and this was funded by cover portraits of celebrities for the Radio Times and the Reader's Digest magazines and technically demanding work including the Embassy cigarettes gift catalogue. Tweedie's work for charities and non-governmental organisations were always subsidised and helped advertising agencies and catalogues. She also covered the Paris student riots in 1968 and photographed the singer Bob Dylan at the Isle of Wight Festival 1969.

Tweedie was denied commissions to cover the 1971 East Pakistan crisis and photographed Air India's in-flight meals at Heathrow Airport in order to obtain a ticket to Calutta (now Kolkata). She was contacted by The Sunday Times after the newspaper used a photograph of hers on one of its front pages. Tweedie and several colleagues travelled into East Bengal by rickshaw when India declared war on Pakistan. The group was arrested by the Indian Army who mistaken them for spies. They were imprisoned in a gaol and Tweedie was isolated in the women's section.

Upon being released, she borrowed cameras and took photographs of the plight of refugees and the bodies of Bengali intellectuals being massacred by the retreating Pakistani forces. While attending a victory celebration at the end of the war held outside Dhaka, Tweedie noticed a group of prisoners accused of being collaborators were going to be bayoneted to death, primarily for the benefit of the assembled foreign press. She and other press workers refused to photograph the event. The following day, The Sunday Times cancelled Tweedie's contract, and despite not regretting her decision, the controversy followed her over the coming years.

She was one of the journalists expelled from Uganda by its president Idi Amin in 1972 during his deportation of Asians. The next year, Tweedie was shot at by planes as an Israeli soldier sheltered her under a tank in a minefield. She successfully smuggled photographs past Israel's strict censorship rules to The Observer. Tweedie later worked in Beirut, and in the aftermath of the Indian Ocean tsunami, she lived amongst the guerrillas in East Timor and began a friendship with the country's future president Xanana Gusmão. Another commission saw her tour the United States with the journalist Alistair Cooke.

=== Later life and death ===
In 1975, she was asked by the BBC to photograph the filming of a programme called Explorers: The Story of Burke and Wills in Alice Springs. Tweedie consequently became fascinated by the lives and work of the Aboriginal people. This led her to take up dual citizenship and resided in Canberra and the Northern Territory. Her son Ben was born in 1976 with the community video artist Clive Scollay. Tweedie's interest in the Aboriginal people led to her being invited to Arnhem Land in 1978 to record the lives of aborigine artists and their families. She and Scollay were two of the five creative artists fellows of 1978 at the Australian National University. In collaboration with the composer Martin Wesley-Smith, Tweedie produced five multi-projector audio-visuals on ‘Kdadalak’ (about Timor in 1977) and ‘Music today '78’ (in Japan). Her work on the Aboriginal people published in the National Geographic. Tweedie wrote her first book This My Country in 1985. A second book, Spirit of Arnhem Land, was published in 1998, and a third called Australia Standing Strong followed three years later.

Tweedie's work was widely exhibited and was awarded the Walkley Award for photojournalism in 1999. She chose not to publish her work before taking the book proofs back to Arnhem Land to ensure that the people were satisfied with their portrayal. Tweedie regularly flew to the United Kingdom where she kept her residence and continued to volunteer with various charities and campaigns. She also kept travelling which saw her work with non-governmental organisations on the effects of landmine victims in Cambodia. At the same time, Tweedie built up a large portfolio of portraits of well-known people and contributed an entire chapter to a book concerning photojournalists and war correspondents. She took stills for the BBC to later Australian productions including the 2002 film Rabbit-Proof Fence. Tweedie returned to Arnhem Land in late 2005 on behalf of Australian Geographic, and made an acclaimed presentation at the 2009 National Union of Journalists' Photographers' conference in London.

During the last years of her life, she cared for her ailing mother in Kent. Tweedie's final work came by the National Trust, and her last publication came in 2010 which contained photographs of Kent and Sussex celebrating thirty years of Hospice in the Weald. Supposedly despondent at the lack of opportunities in her occupation, she hanged herself in the woods close to her home, called Foxhole Farm, in Hawkhurst, on 14 January 2011. Tweedie was survived by her son, her mother and two brothers. At the urging of the former director of the Victorian College of the Arts Andrea Hall in 2013, the National Library of Australia accepted her whole archive consisting of 160,000 slides, negatives, prints and documents, the library's first acquisition of the lifetime works of a woman photographer.
