= Max Pam =

Australian photographer (born 1949)

- Born: 1949 (age 76–77); Melbourne, Victoria, Australia

Max Pam (born 1949) is an Australian photographer.

Pam's first survey exhibition was held at the Art Gallery of Western Australia in 1986, followed by a mid-career retrospective at the Art Gallery of New South Wales in 1991, his largest solo show to date at the Sogo Nara Museum of Art in Japan and was the subject of a major exhibition at the Comptoir de la Photographie in Paris in 1990, which covered the work of three decades.

He has published several photographic monographs and 'carnets de voyage'.

== Life and work ==
Pam was born in Melbourne, Australia. As a teenager he found post-war suburban Melbourne grim, oppressive and culturally isolated. He found refuge in the counter-culture of surfing and the imagery of National Geographic and Surfer Magazine and became determined to travel overseas.

Pam left Australia at 20, after accepting a job as a photographer assisting an astrophysicist. Together, the pair drove a Volkswagen from Calcutta to London. This journey proved inspirational, and Pam has continued to travel, and travel be a theme in his work. As Gary Dufour noted in his essay in Indian Ocean Journals (Steidl, 2000): "Each photograph is shaped by incidents experienced as a traveller. His photographs extend upon the tradition of the gazetteer; each photograph a record of an experience, a personal account of an encounter somewhere in the world. Each glimpse is part of an unfolding story rather than simply a record of a place observed. While travel underscores his production Pam’s photographs are not the accidental evidence of a tourist."

Pam has worked in Asian countries, Europe, Australia, and the Indian Ocean Rim cultures including India, Pakistan, Myanmar, Yemen, Tanzania, Mauritius, Madagascar, the Cocos and Christmas Islands. The images leave the viewer, as Tim Winton said in Going East (Marval 1992), "grateful for having been taken so mysteriously by surprise and so far and sweetly abroad."

He has published work in journals and is represented in major public and private collections in Australia, Great Britain, France and Japan.

Pam is the subject of episode five of the television series Visual Instincts (Artemis International, 1989).

He currently teaches photomedia at Edith Cowan University, Perth, Western Australia.

== Publications ==
=== Publications by Pam ===
- Max Pam: From Eastern Fluency to Southern Recall: Photographs 1980-1985. Art Gallery of Western Australia, 1986.
- Visual Instincts: Contemporary Australian Photography. Canberra: Australian Government Publishing Service, 1989. Edited by Max Pam. Work by Max Pam, Fiona Margaret Hall, Emmanuel Angelicas, The After 200 Years Project, Grant Mudford and Jon Lewis.
- Going East: Two Decades of Asian Photography. Paris: Marval, 1992.
- Human Eye: Max Pam: Photographs 1970-1992. Nara: Nara Sogo Museum of Art, 1992. OCLC 221427711. Exhibition catalogue. Introduction by David Langsam.
- Max Pam: Collection L'oiseau Rare. Paris: Filigranes, 1999.
- Ethiopia. Toulouse: Les Imaginayres, 1999.
- Indian Ocean Journals. Göttingen: Steidl, 2000. With Patrick Remy. Introduction text by Gary Dufour.
- Kailash. Toulouse: Les Imaginayres, 2002.
- Atlas Monographs. Sydney, Australia: T&G Publishing, 2009. With the writer Stephen Muecke.
- "Atlas Monographs-Limited editions Volume 1 and 2." Sydney, Australia: T&G Publishing.
- "Ramadan in Yemen." Paris: Bessard, 2012.
- "Narcolepsy." Sydney: T&G Publishing. With Bob Charles, 2012.
- Contingency in Madagascar. Bristol, UK: Intellect, 2013. ISBN 9781841504742. With Stephen Muecke.

=== Publications with contributions by Pam ===
- Conversations with Contemporary Photographers. New York, NY: Umbrage, 2005. ISBN 978-1884167485. Transcript of a conversation between Pam and Pablo Ortiz Monasterio. Pp. 150. Also includes contributions from Philip-Lorca diCorcia and Nan Richardson; Javier Vallhonrat and Santiago Olma; Miguel Rio Branco and Tereza Siza; Duane Michals and Enrica Vigano; Bernard Plossu and Juan Manual Bonet; Alex Webb and Max Kozloff; John Foncuberta and Cristina Zeklich.

== Major exhibitions ==
- 1973: University of Melbourne, Melbourne.
- 1986: Max Pam: 1980-1985, Art Gallery of Western Australia, Perth.
- 1990: Max Pam: 1971-1990, Comptoir de la Photo, Paris.
- 1992: Max Pam: Retrospective, Nara Sogo Museum of Art, Nara, Japan.
- 1999: Signature Works - 25th Anniversary Exhibition, Australian Centre for Photography, Sydney.
- 2002: Meridian - Focus on Contemporary Australian Art, Museum of Contemporary Art, Sydney.
- 2002: Red Light, Australian Centre for Photography, Sydney.
- 2004: stripTEASE - Max Pam, Australian Centre for Photography, Sydney; Australian Embassy, Paris.

== Awards ==
- 1992: Going East won the Grand Prix du Livre Photographique
- 2010: Atlas Monographs won Best Photography Book of the Year, international category, PHotoEspaña, published by T&G Publishing (Australia).
