= Lynne Roberts-Goodwin =

- Born: 1954 (age 71–72); Sydney
- Education: University of Sydney, University of New South Wales, University of Manchester
- Known for: photography; video; installation
- Notable work: Tankstream; Falconry projects; Disappearing Act; SWARM
- Awards: Josephine Ulrick and Win Schubert Photography Award (2010); Hazelhurst Art Award (2013)
- Website: lynnerobertsgoodwin.com

Lynne Roberts-Goodwin (born 1954) is an Australian photographer, video and installation artist. As one of Australia's leading contemporary artists, she has influenced a generation of visual arts practitioners depicting nature and the landscape. Her photographic work has been described as "grounded in a deep concern for nature and humanity". She has received numerous awards, and her work is held in private and public collections nationally and internationally.

== Life and work ==
Roberts-Goodwin studied at the University of Sydney and University of New South Wales, gaining a postgraduate Master of Fine Art Degree from University of Manchester, Medlock Fine Arts Centre in 1980.

Awards and grants from research institutes and museums enabled her to study wildlife in India, America, Australia and United Arab Emirates, where she documented endangered species to form links between the sciences and the visual arts. Her False Tales series (1995) comprised animal images from history and contemporary urban society, while Boris the Dog 2 conceptually investigated 19th and 20th century animal discourse. Her exhibition Blindfold in the AGNSW Contemporary Project Space in 1997 documented the wapiti and its trade from rural Australia to Seoul, Korea. Her installation Tankstream - Into the head of the cove has been on display in Sydney since 1999.

Bad Birds is a series of 85 images produced while Roberts-Goodwin was on a residency through the Institute of Electronic Art, New York, in 2001. The images are "anti-portraits" (facing away from the camera) of long-dead birds from the collection of the Department of Ornithology at the Australian Museum in Sydney. From an exhibition entitled Landings, it further develops the imaging of interdependent relationship of humans with animals, and how human feelings are translated to the natural world.

The artist's interest in historic and contemporary trade and migration routes continued with the several falconry projects initially undertaken in the United Arab Emirates in 2002 and continuing back and forth with United Arab Emirates, Central Eurasia, Kazakhstan, and western Siberia. Her long series of documentary photographs of contraband birds was described as "post-minimalist or post-conceptualist" art. Her large black and white panoramic photograph of a desolate landscape, shot at night under a full moon, won the Josephine Ulrick and Win Schubert Photography Award in 2010. In 2012, Roberts-Goodwin made a series of photographic/installation works called SWARM.

Roberts-Goodwin's work invites the viewer to engage with unfamiliar contexts and global structures of environmental conflict and sites of impact. Regarding her exhibition More Than Ever, The Art Life commented: "Completely removed from a secular sentimentality or faux religiosity, Roberts-Goodwin's images are bracing observations of the world as it is, unadorned and beautiful in their simple majesty."

She was an artist-in-residence in Los Angeles, New York, New Delhi, Mumbai, Beirut, Mexico, Paris, and Riyadh. She has been a senior lecturer at the University of New South Wales. She is based in Sydney.

== Notable works ==
=== Tankstream - Into the head of the cove (1999) ===
Tankstream - Into the head of the cove is an installation set into the pavement in five separate sites from Pitt Street Mall to Alfred Street in Sydney. It consists of coloured glass modules overlapping and angled away from stainless steel lines, creating a diagram mapping the course of the subterranean Tank Stream in relation to the direction of Pitt Street, comparing the natural and man-made conduits of energy in the city. At the final site on Alfred Street the rods splay to represent the delta as the stream flows into Sydney Cove. The installation includes an inscription by Captain Watkin Tench, who recorded the presence of water in Sydney Cove in his diary in 1788. A sixth site was added indoors, in the foyer of City Recital Hall. The installation is one of Roberts-Goodwin's works that have been seen as "a path to return afresh to what we think we know of the past, and how we think we know it through present engagement and dissemination." Her public works have been characterised by being almost invisible, as she prefers art in city streets and parks to have minimal impact on their surroundings.

=== Falconry projects (2002-) ===
In 2002, Roberts-Goodwin was first invited to undertake a falconry project at Abu Dhabi Falcon Hospital, Sweihan, Abu Dhabi, by avian veterinarian specialist Dr. Jaime Samour. It was followed by projects undertaken at the Wrsan wildlife sanctuary near Abu Dhabi at the request of Zayed bin Sultan Al Nahyan, President of the United Arab Emirates. Since then, she has been photographing Arabian falcons and falconers to examine "the conceptual issues of the 'perceived exotic' of place and racial belonging", both as a Western stereotype and as a living practice. She has also been liaising with an assisting ornithologists in the region to develop animal passports to assist the regulation of the international rare species trade and the eradication of the illicit hunting-bird market.

=== Disappearing Act (2005) ===
In 2004, Roberts-Goodwin undertook a project involving the Incense/Frankincense Trade and migration route commencing in Oman, through Yemen then traversing the Kings Highway in Jordan. The Disappearing Act project followed the route indexing many sites of prehistoric villages, biblical towns, Crusader Castles, Nabatean temples, Roman Fortresses, Islamic towns and the key archaeological sites within Jordan. Her work on the project was exhibited at Sherman Gallery Goodhope, Sydney, Australia.

=== SWARM (2012) ===
SWARM is a series of photographic/installation works that involved imagining the flight of black ravens in high altitude habitats of central Iran, Mexico, U.S.A, India and Northern Cyprus: locations that are extreme in geopolitical, topographical or cultural terms. Roberts-Goodwin's images use "spatial aesthetics"; that is, "the complex entanglements between local and global ideas of place." A digital photograph print from the series, called as the sky falls through five fingers #131 (the "five fingers" are the peaks of the Kyrenia Mountains), won the Hazelhurst Art Award in 2013. Commenting the fact that she was working in very remote locations, the artist said she liked "dirty landscapes, not picturesque landscapes".

== Selected solo exhibitions ==
- 1979: Over There, Coventry Gallery, Sydney, Australia
- 1980: From Here, Peterloo Gallery, Manchester, United Kingdom
- 1981: North/South, Whitworth Gallery, Manchester, United Kingdom
- 1981: Drawn, Sloane Street Gallery, London, United Kingdom
- 1982: Works 1981 / 1982, Sloane Street Gallery, London, United Kingdom
- 1982: Recent O/S Works, Coventry Gallery, Sydney, Australia
- 1984: Works 1982 / 1984, IMAGES Gallery, Sydney, Australia
- 1984: Site Works, SALLE SANDOZ Gallery, CitC) Internationale des Arts, Paris, France
- 1986: Recent Works, Coventry Gallery, Sydney, Australia
- 1986: Looking Glass, SALLE SANDOZ Gallery, CitC) Internationale des Arts, Paris, France
- 1989: NO SPACE, Camera Lucida Window Space, Sydney, Australia
- 1989: Works 1989, Coventry Gallery, Sydney, Australia
- 1990: MOMENT, Camera Lucida Window Space, Sydney, Australia
- 1990: SPACES OF DISSENSION, ROAR 2 Studios Gallery, Melbourne, Australia
- 1991: TERRASCAPE, CITRI Gallery, Melbourne, Australia
- 1991: TOUCH, Linden Gallery, Melbourne, Australia
- 1992: TOUCH, First Draft Gallery, Sydney, Australia
- 1993: 90's Work!, Biota Gallery, Los Angeles, U.S.A.
- 1993: PHANTASM, Australian Centre for Photography, Sydney, Australia
- 1994: Remote-Half-Light, Perth Institute of Contemporary Art (PICA), Perth, Australia
- 1994: Remote-Half-Light, Australian Centre for Contemporary Art, Melbourne, Australia
- 1994: A Certain Blindness, Centre for Contemporary Photography, Fitzroy, Melbourne, Australia
- 1995: False Tales, Michael Wardell Gallery, Melbourne, Australia
- 1995: False Tales, Dishy Dogs, 4 x 4, New Museum of Contemporary Art, New York, U.S.A.
- 1995: Blindfold, Artspace, Auckland, New Zealand
- 1997: Blindfold, The Art Gallery of New South Wales, Sydney, Australia
- 1997: Pink Planks, Artspace, Sydney, Australia
- 1999: Solo exhibition at Renard Wardell Gallery, Melbourne, Australia
- 2002: Landings, Boutwell Draper Gallery, Sydney, Australia
- 2003: Azure, Australian Centre for Photography, Sydney; Cultural Foundation, Abu Dhabi, UAE
- 2005: Disappearing Act, Sherman Galleries, Sydney, Australia
- 2007: Random Acts, Sherman Galleries, Sydney, Australia
- 2014: MORE THAN EVER, .M Contemporary Gallery, Sydney, Australia
- 2014: Solo exhibition at Cohen Hadler Contemporary, Sydney, Australia
- 2016: "closeupatadistance" Kronenberg Wright Artists Projects, Sydney, Australia

== Collections ==
Roberts-Goodwin's work is held in the following public and private collections:

- Art Gallery of New South Wales, Sydney, Australia
- National Gallery of Victoria, Melbourne, Australia
- Museum of Contemporary Art, Sydney, Australia
- Artbank
- Australian Opera Trust
- Gold Coast City Art Gallery
- Goldman Sachs Group, Inc.
- Transfield Foundation/Kumagai Australian Collection
- M Contemporary Gallery, Sydney, Australia
- Aberson Exhibits, Tulsa, Oklahoma, U.S.A.
- Nuova Galleria Morone, Milan, Italy
- TAFE Collection, Bathurst, Australia
- RMIT Collection, Melbourne, Australia
- Peter Stuyvesant Trust
- Westpac Collection
- Australian Embassy, Abu Dhabi
- Department of Trade & Foreign Affairs, Australia-India Commission, Delhi
- Sheikh Zayhad Bin Sultan Al Nayhan
- Sheikh Mohammad Bin Sultan Al Nayhan, Crown Prince Private Collection
- CitC) Internationale Des Arts, Paris
- University of Illinois, Chicago
- Grosvenor Gallery, Manchester
- Medlock Fine Art Centre, Manchester
- Peterloo Gallery, Manchester
- Sloane Street Gallery, London
- Whitworth Gallery, Manchester
- ERWDA (Environmental Research and Wildlife Development Agency) Collection, Abu Dhabi
- NID Collection, Ahmenabad

== Publications ==
- Times Like These, 2012
- More Than Ever: Lynne Roberts Goodwin, Bondi, 2014
- Disappearing Act, 2005
- Random Acts, 2007

== Awards ==
- 2010: Josephine Ulrick and Win Schubert Photography Award
- 2013: Hazelhurst Art Award

== Grants ==
Roberts-Goodwin received the following grants:

- 1979: Basil and Muriel Hooper Travelling Art Scholarship, Art Gallery of New South Wales, Sydney
- 1980: Dyason Bequest Artist Travel Grant, Art Gallery of New South Wales, Sydney
- 1983: Artists Overseas Travel Grant, Visual Arts/Crafts Board, Australia Council
- 1985: London Education Authority Artist Travel Grant, UK
- 1989: New Image Research Grant, Australian Film Commission, Sydney
- 1998-99: Department of Primary Industries Grant, Australian Quarantine and Inspection Service (AQIS)
- 1992-96: Faculty Research Grant, COFA, University of New South Wales, Sydney
- 1996-97: New Work Grant, Visual Arts Fund, Australia Council
- 1999-2000: Faculty Research Grant, COFA, University of New South Wales, Sydney
- 1999-2000: Australia India Foundation Grant, collaboration with World Wildlife Fund and Wilderness India
- 2000: UNESCO Sanskriti Artist Asialink Residency, Sanskriti, New Delhi, India
- 2001-02: UNSW Research Grant (UAE; Washington, Chicago, US)
- 2000-03: UNSW Research Grant (Saudi Arabia; Pakistan; India)
- 2003-04: New Work Grant, Visual Arts Fund, Australia Council
- 2005-06: New Work Grant, Visual Arts Fund, Australia Council
- 2009 New Work Grant, Visual Arts Fund, Australia Council
- 2012 New Work Grant, Visual Arts Fund, Australia Council
- International Commissions/Projects:
  - Hashemite Kingdom of Jordan ‘Dead Sea’ Project, 2015-2016
  - Australia India Institute, ARTIST RETREAT, Jaipur, India 2013
  - ONDARTE International Artist's Residency, Akumal, Mexico, 2012
  - Fondation Arabe pour l'Image Artist Residency, Beirut, Lebanon, 2009
  - AQIS Quarantine Artist-in-Residence, Sydney International Airport, Sydney 2005
  - ERWDA (Environmental Research Wildlife Development Agency) and Environment Agency Abu Dhabi (EAD) Falcon Hospital Residency, Abu Dhabi, 2002
  - Rockefeller Foundation Artist Residency, Alfred, New York, 2001
  - UNESCO Sanskriti Kendra, Delhi, India
