= Eugenia Raskopoulos =

Australian artist

Eugenia Raskopoulos (born 1959) is a contemporary artist notable for her photographic and video work critiquing language, processes of translation, and the body. Raskopoulos' work has been shown in numerous Australian and International exhibitions, and was the winner of the Josephine Ulrick and Win Schubert Award for her work Vestiges #3, 2010.

Raskopoulos was born in the Czech Republic. She migrated back to Greece in 1959 with her family, then to Australia in 1963.

Informed by the migrant experience, her works explore aspects of ‘otherness’, and she situates her work at the margins of photography and video, an interdisciplinary zone that synthesises performance, transcription, neon and installation. Her works also explore ideas of identity, translation, language and the body.

== Solo exhibitions ==
- Arc One Gallery
- Art Gallery of New South Wales
- Australian Centre for Photography
- Artspace
- Casula Powerhouse Arts Centre
- UQ Art Museum
- Art Beijing, China
- William Wright Artists Projects
- Darklight Photography Gallery

== Awards ==
- Josephine Ulrick and Win Schubert Award, 2012.
- MoMA scholarship for The Feminist Future conference from the Museum of Modern Art in New York.

== Publications ==
- Art Collector magazine: "Standout Exhibitions" by Daniel Mudie Cunningham.
