= Ellen Brooks =

American photographer (born 1946)

Ellen Brooks (born February 3, 1946) is an American photographer. She began her career on the West Coast, and is associated with the Los Angeles–based art community of the late 1960s and '70s. In 1982 she moved to New York, where her practice has since been based. Her work is known for its boundary-pushing forays into sculpture, and for her use of screens and image altering pro-filmic photographic processes. She has shown at the Museum of Modern Art (MOMA), the Whitney Museum of American Art, the Los Angeles Museum of Contemporary Art, and the Centre Pompidou, and has worked in the permanent collections of the MOMA, the Whitney, the National Museum of American Art, the Getty Museum, and others.

== Biography ==
=== Early works ===
Ellen Brooks was born in Los Angeles, California. She received both her bachelor's degree and her master's degree in Fine Arts from the University of California, Los Angeles, in 1968 and 1971 respectively. Her early works dealt primarily with human figures, notably Beach Piece, an early work in which she employed the photographic medium to address issues of alienation versus bodily presence in space. The work, which featured larger-than-lifesize nude figures in various poses of recline, was installed on Venice Beach, from which the figures appeared to half-emerge from the sand. During her graduate studies she constructed a series of flats [Flats 1–5] which were shown at the Museum of Modern Art in the 1970 exhibition Photography Into Sculpture. The flats addressed similar issues of scale to Beach Piece from the opposite direction, incorporating the viewer's vantage point from above to obfuscate the objects’ situation in space.

Following her MFA she moved to San Francisco, where her use of the photograph continued a progression of investigations of scale and installation. Her next major work, Adolescent Piece, also used nude bodies. The work would subsequently be refabricated and reinstalled in several different forms at different scales over the next four decades, at University of Las Vegas, San Francisco Art Institute, and at the Los Angeles Institute of Contemporary Art. Its most recent iteration, at MOCA in 2011, employed the original process of 1976, using Xerox transfers from photographic contact sheets. This installation "constituted a 'fourth generation' of the photographs," according to the artist. "The first generation was the negative; the second, the eight-by-10-inch contact sheet, the third, the machine copy of the contact sheet onto wax paper, and the fourth, the images glued onto the gallery walls." The work garnered significant attention during several of its stagings, due to the relative unguardedness of its young, unclothed subjects, all between the ages of ten and fifteen.

=== Tableaux ===
In the late 70s and into the 1980s, Brooks worked on an extended series called Tableaux. Like the earlier flats, the Tableaux used the reduced scale of maquettes to stage film still-esque scenes of domestic interiors and dilemmas, often incorporating disarray or ambiguous circumstances within their three walls. Created using miniature figures and other ephemera from the everyday world, these were meant to recall both the rote "stock" characters of soap opera, and domestic dramas constructed from real life accounts and from magazines. The scenes were photographed and subsequently sized up once again. The series was shown at Barbara Gladstone Gallery in 1982, and a selection of the works was also included in the 1983 Whitney Biennial.

In 1985, Brooks installed light boxes of photo transparencies as a site-specific window display at the New Museum of Contemporary Art's then-location on Broadway. Using highly staged iconography appropriated from various cultural intersections of art and commerce, the display's location was meant to address the work's position to commercial interests, both metaphorically and in terms of its physical siting.

=== Screen Pieces ===
Beginning in the late 1980s, Brooks began to translate her interest in appropriated and generic imagery to a literal process, incorporating ever-increasing levels of distance from the source material. The artist employed a black foam-based material she would refer to as a screen, which compressed and flattened visual information. Placed between the camera and the subject, itself taken from advertising print, calendars and other reproductions, the screen acted as an additional point of interception between the initial object and its image.

=== Current Projects ===
More recently Brooks has expanded her sculptural practice out from maquettes into large-scale sculptural reconstitutions of photo-based printed fabrics, creating a series of optically charged large-format abstract photographs. The sculptures serve as source material for, and exist peripherally to the final photographs.

She served on the faculty of New York University's Tisch School of the Arts in the Photography Department from 1985 to 2008, and has taught at the Cooper Union, the School of Visual Arts, and the Rhode Island School of Design among others. She was a recipient of the National Endowment for the Arts grant twice, in 1979 and 1991, and served on the final NEA panel for photography, shortly before the collapse of the Association's funding and subsequent dismantling of many of its programs.

In 2011, she was included in two retrospective exhibitions: for LA MOCA's Under the Big Black Sun exhibition as part of the Pacific Standard Time citywide initiative, and in Photography into Sculpture at Cherry and Martin Gallery. She lives and works in New York.

== Collections (selected list) ==
- Museum of Modern Art, New York
- Whitney Museum of American Art, New York
- Getty Museum of Art, Malibu, California
- Los Angeles County Museum of Art, California
- San Francisco Museum of Modern Art, California
- National Museum of American Art, Washington, D.C.
- Allen Memorial Art Museum, Oberlin College, Ohio
- University of California at Los Angeles, California
- Albright-Knox Museum, Buffalo, New York
- Museo d’ Arte Contemporaneo, Mexico City, Mexico
- Deutsche Bank, Frankfurt, Germany
- City of Paris
- National Gallery of Canada, Ottawa, Canada
- Musee d’Art Contemporain of Montreal, Ontario, Canada
- Southeast Banking Corporation, Coral Gables, Florida
- Capitol Group Corporation (commissioned project) New York
- Allan Goldring, New York City, New York
- Standard Oil
- Merrill Lynch
- Goldman Sachs Corporation
- Progressive Corporation
- Fred Alger Corporation
- Pitney Bowes Corporation
- U.S. Trust
- Willis Corroon Corporation
- Polaroid Corporation
