= Jane Burton =

Australian photographer (born 1966)

Jane Burton (born 1966) is an Australian photographer who lives and works in Melbourne.

== Exhibitions ==
- The Eye of the Beholder, Glen Eira City Gallery, Melbourne, Australia, 2009. A retrospective.
- I Did It For You, Centre for Contemporary Photography, Melbourne, Australia, 2005.

== Collections ==
Burton's work is held in the following public collections: National Gallery of Victoria, Melbourne; Tasmanian Museum and Art Gallery, Hobart; Newcastle Art Gallery, Newcastle; Monash University, Melbourne and Monash Gallery of Art, Wheelers Hill.

== General references ==
- Jane Burton, Artabase
