= Robyn Stacey =

Australian photographer (born 1952)

- Born: 1952 (age 73–74)
- Known for: large still life photographs
- Awards: Anne & Gordon Samstag International Visual Arts Scholarship
- Website: https://robynstacey.com.au/

Robyn Stacey (born 1952) is an Australian photographer and new media artist known for her large striking still lifes.

== Biography ==
Stacey was born in 1952. She has worked with major natural history collections since the mid-1980s, reworking and developing the still life genre.

Stacey is the recipient of major awards and research grants including the Samstag Scholarship in 1994 to study at the School of Visual Arts in New York.

She has undertaken residencies at the Macleay Museum at the University of Sydney, Leiden University, the Historic Houses Trust of New South Wales, the Royal Botanic Gardens and the National Center for Supercomputing Applications at the University of Illinois.

Her work is represented in major national collections including the National Gallery of Australia, National Portrait Gallery, Art Gallery of New South Wales, Art Gallery of Western Australia, National Gallery of Victoria, Art Gallery of South Australia, Queensland Art Gallery, the New South Wales Historic Houses Trust, the City of Sydney, Samstag Museum and Artbank.

== Selected work ==
=== Solo exhibitions ===
- 2019 – As still as life, Monash Gallery of Art, Melbourne
- 2016 – Magic Object: The Adelaide Biennial of Australian Art, Art Gallery of South Australia, Adelaide
- 2015 – Robyn Stacey: Cloud Land, Museum of Brisbane
- 2003 – The Collector's Nature, Stills Gallery, Sydney

=== Group exhibitions ===
- 1991 – Untitled, Ivan Dougherty Gallery, Sydney
- 1996 – Photography is Dead! Long Live Photography!, Museum of Contemporary Art, Sydney
- 2015 – The Photograph And Australia, QAGOMA, Brisbane

=== Publications ===
- 2011 – Home
- 2007 – Museum
- 2001 – Herbarium
