= Leah King-Smith =

Australian photographer

- Born: Gympie, Queensland, Australia
- Education: Bachelor of Fine Arts, -1986 Queensland University of Technology, Brisbane, QLD Master of Fine Art, -2001 Doctor of Philosophy, -2006
- Known for: Photography
- Notable work: Patterns of Connection
- Style: Contemporary Indigenous photography

Leah King-Smith is a Bigambul descendant, visual artist and lecturer in the School of Creative Practice (Creative Industries) QUT, Brisbane, Australia. She is best known for her photo compositions.

Her 1991 series Patterns of Connection is widely recognised and has been exhibited both in Australia and overseas. King-Smith's work was exhibited in The Thousand Mile Stare: A Photographic Exhibition at the Australian Centre for Contemporary Art, Melbourne. Her early work mainly explored the ideas of identity and how it can shift throughout time.

== Early life ==
King-Smith was born in Gympie, Queensland. Having an indigenous mother and a white father stirred an interest in King-Smith to explore in her photography issues concerning cultural discord.

== Education ==
In 1986, King-Smith completed a Bachelor of Fine Arts, majoring in Photography, at Victoria College in Melbourne. King-Smith went on to complete a Master of Arts by research at the Queensland University of Technology in 2001 before graduating from the same university with a PhD in visual arts in 2006.

== Photography career ==
King-Smith began exhibiting in 1985, while studying for her undergraduate degree, and has continued to exhibit regularly. In 1988 her work was exhibited in group exhibition The Thousand Mile Stare: A Photographic Exhibition at the Australian Centre for Contemporary Art, Melbourne in 1988.

King-Smith's Patterns of Connection (1991) was exhibited at the Victorian Centre of Photography, Melbourne and the Australian Centre of Photography, Sydney in 1992 and later that year at Camerawork Gallery, London, as part of its Southern Crossings show. Best known for this series, King-Smith's work on Patterns of Connection, began when she was presented with two grants by the Stegley Foundation. The grant was given through the Koori Oral History Program for King-Smith to make a picture book of hundred photographs for the nineteenth-century Aboriginal people, which were taken by European photographers. However, the project took a different turn as King-Smith felt so moved by the portraits, she felt the need to make it more personally engaging. King-Smith decided to go about this by creating "photo-compositions", which are artworks that combine the photographs from the nineteenth century with her own photographs in colour of the Victorian landscape and paint. This new turn in the project repositioned Aboriginal people to be seen in a more positive light and in a spiritual and living domain. Landscape and figure were brought together in these works to showcase how important landscape is to the Aboriginal people, in addition to removing the negative connotations of confinement and control presented in the original photographs.

Duncan King-Smith (King-Smith's partner) is a sound designer who accompanied the works with a soundscape recording of the Australian bush, which was used to create a more engaging experience. The series was widely exhibited and toured with various exhibitions not only around Australia, but internationally to places such as the United Kingdom and North America.

In 1998, King-Smith was selected for inclusion in the exhibition In the Realm of Phantoms – Photographs of the Invisible at the Museum Abteiberg, Mönchengladbach, Germany.

In 1997 and 1999 she was also selected for inclusion in the exhibitions Metamorphosis and Beyond Myth - Oltre il Mito, part of the Venice Biennales.

She has created several visual artworks as part of her practice-led research, and has been regularly exhibiting in solo and group exhibitions since 1985.

In the lead-up to the 2006 Commonwealth Games (held in Melbourne), King-Smith was given a commission by the National Portrait Gallery to create four portraits. These portraits were to be of indigenous athletes and to be made using King-Smith's photo-composition technique.

In 2014, she was commissioned to make a public artwork for the Translink North Lakes Bus Station, north of Brisbane. In 2016 her work was exhibited in the group exhibition Over the Fence, and documented in the accompanying catalogue Over the Fence, Contemporary Indigenous Photography from the Corrigan Collection.

Her work is held across Australia in collections including the National Gallery of Victoria, National Gallery of Australia, the State Library of Victoria, Art Gallery of New South Wales and other public galleries. Her artworks are also in private collections, as well as in some international collections.

== Academic career ==
King-Smith's focus is particularly driven by change for equity and cultural competence in teaching and learning, as well as the encouragement of cultural perspectives in practice-led research.

King-Smith has an extensive career as a photo and digital media artist, encompassing solo, collaborative and group exhibitions, community engagement, dance performances, theatre productions, international cultural exchanges, book covers, story illustration and experimental film & video work. Her current practice includes 3D animation technologies within a trans-disciplinary collaborative praxis.
