= Pat Brassington =

Australian photographer (born 1942)

- Born: 1942 (age 83–84); Hobart, Tasmania, Australia
- Known for: Photography, digital media
- Awards: Bowness Photography Prize

Pat Brassington (born 1942) is an Australian contemporary artist working in the field of digital art, and photography. Born in Hobart, Tasmania, she was named Australia's key surrealist working in photomedia.

Despite their provocative content, Brassington's images are notably restrained. Beyond their iconography of dreams, fantasies, and imaginings, her work engages with the formal properties of photography. Her images are characterized by elegance, refinement, and careful composition, a quality some have described as 'classicising'.

Brassington's work has been exhibited in Australia and internationally in galleries and festivals. She has been featured extensively in national and international exhibitions, including the 2012 Adelaide Biennial Parallel Collisions; Á Rebours, a major survey exhibition at the Australian Centre for Contemporary Art ACCA (2012), which toured to the ACP, Sydney (2013); a solo exhibition in Lönnstrom Art Museum, Finland and the Helsinki Festival (2008); the Cambridge Road series at the IMA (2007); the 2004 Biennale of Sydney; and a major retrospective at the Ian Potter Gallery, Melbourne (2002).

Her work is held in numerous private and public collections, including the NGA, AGNSW, QAG, TMAG, NGV, AGWA and Artbank.

A portrait of Pat Brassington in 2017 was painted by Amanda Davies. She won Australia's Portia Geach Memorial Award for women artists, for a portrait painted from life of a man or woman distinguished in Art, Letters, or the Sciences.

== Awards ==
- 2013 winner, Bowness Photography Prize with the image Shadow Boxer, from her series Quill.
- 2017 winner, inaugural Don MacFarlane Prize, a new philanthropic fund established to honour the life and artistic ambitions of respected Melbourne businessman Donald (Don) Macfarlane. The award was created to recognise the artistic practice of a senior Australian artist and their ongoing cultural contribution and commitment to leadership in the visual arts.

== Education ==
Pat Brassington studied printmaking and photography at the Tasmanian School of Art in the early 1980s.
