= Anne Ferran =

Australian photographer

Anne Ferran (born 1949) is an Australian photographer.

== Background ==
Anne Ferran was born on 10 May 1949 in Sydney, New South Wales. Ferran began exhibiting her photographic work in the early 1980s.

In 1986 she relocated to Europe after being awarded a Visual Arts Board travel grant from an Australian committee. She then took up a six-month residency at the Power Studio at the Cité internationale des arts in Paris. Ferran returned from overseas to Sydney to complete her Masters of Fine Arts, but then shifted to Melbourne in 1995 only a year after graduating. In 2003 she received a residency in London from the Australian Council. Ferran currently lives in Sydney. She recently retired from her role as an associate professor at the University of Sydney.

== Education ==
Ferran has a BA from the University of Sydney, a BA from Sydney College of the Arts (1985), and an MFA from the College of Fine Arts, University of New South Wales.

== Career ==
Ferran was first recognized as a contemporary photographic artist during the 1980s due to her works: Carnal Knowledge and Scenes on the Death of Nature. As well as film and digital photography, Ferran uses a variety of different medias such as videography and a series of textile works. Her photographs have been exhibited both across Australia and internationally. The Art Gallery of New South Wales, Art Gallery of South Australia, Monash University, National Gallery of Australia, National Gallery of Victoria and Queensland Art Gallery have all featured Ferran’s work. Internationally, Ferran’s exhibits have been displayed in three different countries: New Zealand, Japan and the United States of America.

Ferran’s work is motivated by the Australian colonial period; her main interest involves exploring the lives of nameless women and children. Later in her life Ferran’s interests have extended to histories of birds and the way that their natural environments are changing. Her touring retrospective of 2014 curated by Felicity Johnson was accompanied by an extensive catalogue.

== Notable works ==
=== Scenes on the Death of Nature (1986) ===
Scenes on the Death of Nature was first exhibited at The Australian Centre for Contemporary Art in South Bank, from 19 March 1987 until 19 April 1987. The series was included in an exhibition at the Art Gallery of New South Wales in 1993 entitled ‘Points of view: Australian Photography 1985-95’. The exhibition consisted of five large (148.5 cm x 109.5 cm) black and grey prints of young women draped across one another. The women were dressed in long flowing plain white garments with stony facial expressions in order to recreate the appearance of a neoclassical sculpture. Her work, Scenes on the Death of Nature I, 1986 was featured in Part I of the Know My Name exhibition of Australian women artists in 2020-21 at the National Gallery of Australia.

=== Carnal Knowledge 1984 ===
Ferran used her own daughter and friends as subjects in this project in an attempt to add a maternal component to the photographs.

While the series of 13 images are sexualised, the images do not contain any nudity. The images are close ups of emotionless faces, which have been given the effect of stone to create the appearance of the passing of time. The exhibition was on show at the Art Gallery of New South Wales in Sydney alongside other photographic series for the Australian Perspecta exhibition in 1985. It returned again to the Art Gallery of New South Wales in July 1999 for the exhibition ‘What is this thing called photography?’

=== Lost to worlds 2008 ===
Lost to worlds includes over a decade's worth of photographic work. The project was undertaken in Tasmanian at the remnants of two female convict prisons sites, known as female factories. The work conjures with Australia's shameful colonial past and is part of an international trend in art practice that is described as the "archival turn." One female factory was located in Hobart, the other was situated in the centre of Tasmanian on the border of the small town of Ross; all that remains of the latter prison today are one building, piles of dirt and a mess of stones. The images themselves are dominated by the landscape, barely giving the viewer any other perspectives, only occasionally offering a sight of the horizon or sky. The thirty images in the series are digitally printed (120 cm x 120 cm) onto sheets of aluminium and set up so that when viewers move around the gallery observing the photographs, the reflections from the aluminium give the images an element of blurred motion. Ferran uses the large empty field to find elegance through the stillness in this series of visually confronting images, the series is symbolic of a fragmented past.

=== Tamworth Textile Triennial:Tension(s) 2020 ===
Anne Ferran will exhibit at the Tamworth Regional Gallery from 1 August 2020.

=== Other exhibitions ===
- Box Of Birds
- Female House Of Correction
- Birds Of Darlinghurst
- Rydalmere Vertical
- Songbirds Are Everywhere
- Soft Caps
- Lost To Worlds 2008
- Scenes On The Death Of Nature
- Backwater
- Untitled Photograms
- Twice Removed
- Insula
- 1-38
