= Everton (name) =

Everton is a habitational name of Old English origin, derived from eofor (wild boar) and tun (settlement/enclosure), meaning "boar settlement/enclosure." It is used both as a surname and as a given name. Notable people with the name include:

== Given name ==
- Éverton Alemão (born 1993), Brazilian footballer
- Everton Bala (born 1999), Brazilian footballer
- Everton Bezerra (born 1984), Brazilian footballer
- Everton Blair (born 1992), American politician
- Everton Blender (born 1954), Musical artist
- Everton Bunsie (born 1977), Jamaican footballer
- Everton Camargo (born 1991), Hong Kong footballer
- Everton Carr (born 1961), Antigua and Barbudan footballer
- Everton Chimulirenji, Vice President of Malawi from 2019 to 2020
- Everton Clarke (born 1992), Jamaican sprinter
- Everton Conger (1834–1918), American judge
- Everton Cornelius (born 1955), Antigua and Barbuda sprinter
- Everton Costa (born 1986), Brazilian footballer
- Everton Dias (born 1990), Brazilian footballer
- Everton (footballer, born 1979), Brazilian footballer
- Everton (footballer, born 1983), Brazilian footballer
- Éverton (footballer, born 1983), Brazilian footballer
- Everton (footballer, born 1986), Brazilian footballer
- Everton (footballer, born 1988), Brazilian footballer
- Everton (footballer, born 1990), Brazilian footballer
- Everton (footballer, born 1993), Brazilian footballer
- Everton (footballer, born April 1995), Brazilian footballer
- Everton (footballer, born August 1984), Brazilian footballer
- Everton (footballer, born August 1995), Brazilian footballer
- Everton Felipe (born 1997), Brazilian footballer
- Everton Fox (born 1964), British weather presenter
- Everton Galdino (born 1997), Brazilian footballer
- Everton Giovanella (born 1970), Brazilian footballer
- Everton Heleno (born 1990), Brazilian footballer
- Éverton Lopes (born 1988), Brazilian boxer
- Everton Luiz (born 1988), Brazilian footballer
- Everton Maceió (born 2003), Brazilian footballer
- Everton Matambanadzo (born 1976), Zimbabwean cricketer
- Everton Mattis (born 1957), Jamaican cricketer
- Everton Messias (born 2002), Brazilian footballer
- Everton Mlalazi (born 1982), Musical artist
- Everton Morelli (born 1997), Brazilian footballer
- Everton Nogueira (born 1959), Brazilian footballer
- Everton Pedalada (born 1984), Brazilian footballer
- Everton Pereira (footballer) (born 2003), French footballer
- Éverton Ribeiro (born 1989), Brazilian footballer
- Éverton Santos (born 1986), Brazilian footballer
- Everton Sena (born 1991), Brazilian footballer
- Everton Silva (born 1988), Brazilian footballer
- Everton Soares (born 1996), Brazilian footballer
- Tom (footballer, born 1986) (born 1986), Brazilian footballer
- Everton Vanoni (born 1981), Brazilian football coach
- Everton Weekes (1925–2020), West Indian cricketer

== Surname ==
- Clive Everton (1937–2024), English sports commentator
- John Hannett, Baron Hannett of Everton (born 1953), British trade unionist
- John Scott Everton (1908–2003), American college president and diplomat
- Loren D. Everton (1915–1991), US Marine Corps officer
- Macduff Everton (born 1947), American photographer
- Rafael Everton (born 1989), Brazilian association football coach
- Samantha Everton, Australian photographer

== See also ==
- Everton (disambiguation)
