= Vanoni =

Vanoni is an Italian surname, derived from the given name Giovanni via the hypocorism Vanni. Notable people with the surname include:

- Everton Vanoni (born 1981), Brazilian football manager
- Ezio Vanoni (1903–1956), Italian economist and politician
- Giovanni Antonio Vanoni (1810–1886), Swiss painter
- Ornella Vanoni (1934–2025), Italian singer

== See also ==
- Casa Vanoni
- Vannoni
