= Andrew Rovenko =

Ukrainian-Australian photographer (born 1978)

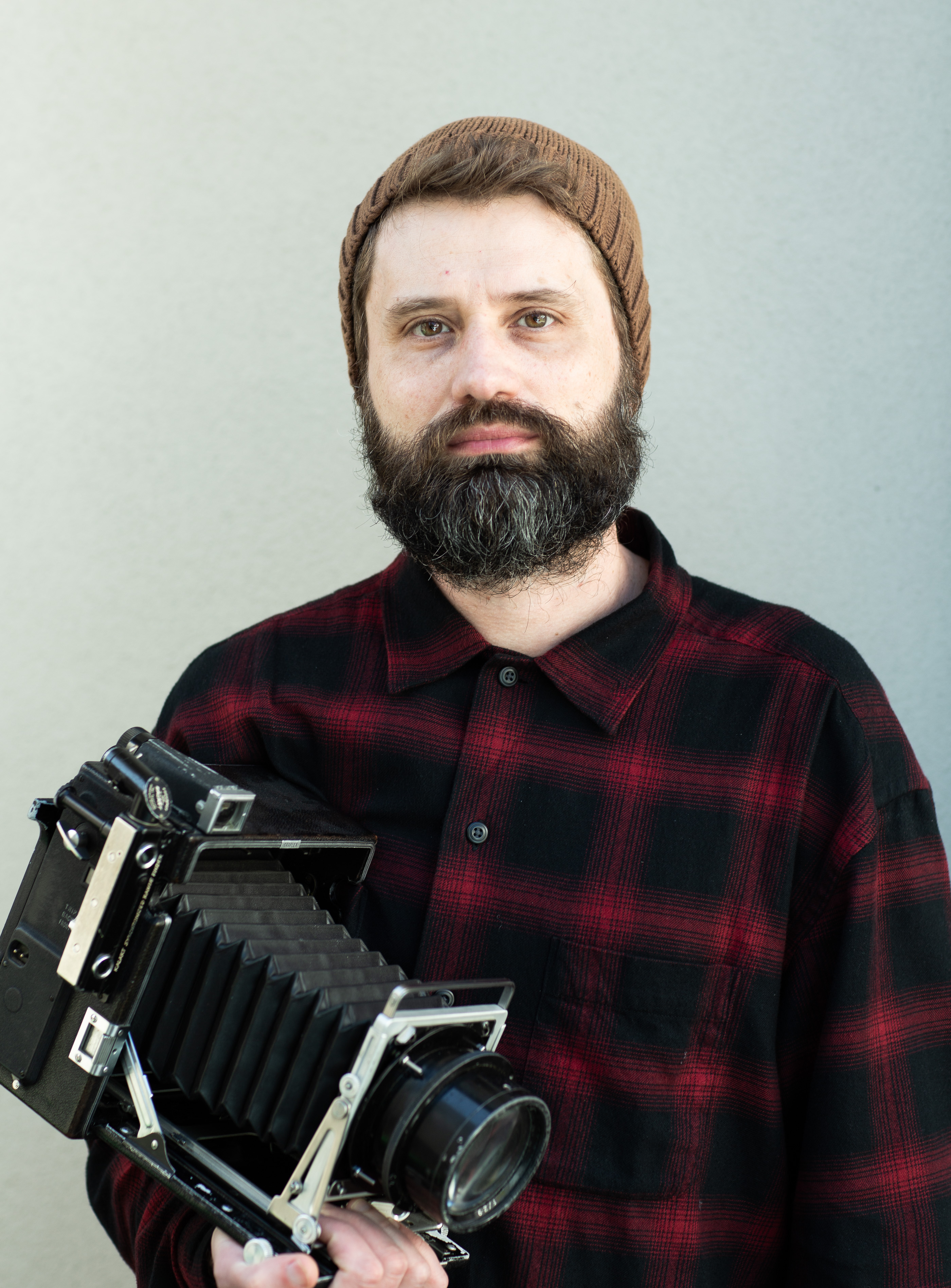
- Born: 1978 (age 47–48); Odessa, Ukrainian SSR, USSR (now Ukraine)
- Occupation: Photographer
- Known for: Photography
- Notable work: The Rocketgirl Chronicles
- Style: Fine Art
- Awards: 2021 Australian Photographer of the Year
- Website: rovenko.com

Andrew Rovenko (born 1978) is an Australian photographer of Ukrainian origin who is based in Melbourne. He is known for his award-winning Rocketgirl Chronicles series that was captured in Victoria's coronavirus lockdown. Rovenko was named 2021 Australian Photographer of the Year by the Australian Photography Magazine, as well as 2022 Australasia's Top Emerging Photographer (Portrait) by the Capture Magazine.

== Early life and education ==
Rovenko was born and raised in Odesa, Ukraine and moved to Australia in his mid 20s. He was noticed for his amateur photography first, which led to him being invited to work as a freelance magazine photographer, where he gained professional experience before switching back to personal projects.

== Rocketgirl Chronicles ==
The Rocketgirl Chronicles is a series of images featuring Rovenko's young daughter in a home-made astronaut suit designed by his wife. With the first photographs originally intended as family memories, documenting the daily walks within the permitted radius under the restrictions of Melbourne's prolonged lockdown, they quickly found resonance both locally and abroad, with high-profile publications including Vogue and Rolling Stone, being featured in exhibitions around the world and receiving multiple international photography awards.

The photograph from the series titled "The Shuttle" was selected as the cover for British Journal of Photography "Portrait of Humanity", a yearly publication of remarkable portraits from around the world.

With the author being a practitioner of traditional photography workflow, the series was captured on medium format film using Mamiya RZ67 camera.

== The Book ==
The Rocketgirl Chronicles photography book was published in 2023, attracting acclaim winning 2024 Book Photographer of the Year at Px3 (Prix de la Photographie, Paris) as well as being named Best Fine Art Publication at International Photography Awards and Tokyo International Foto Awards. It includes over 100 images from the project, with ABC news describing the photographs as "timeless and otherworldly". (ISBN 9780645777475)

== Exhibitions ==
- 2025 Festival Art Souterrain, Montreal Underground City, Canada
- 2025 PX3 Winners and State of the World, House of Lucie, Athens, Greece
- 2025 XPosure International Photography Festival, Sharjah, UAE
- 2025 Home of the Arts, Gold Coast, Australia
- 2024 Treviso Photographic Festival, Luigi Bailo Museum, Italy
- 2024 Percival Photographic Portrait Prize, Perc Tucker Gallery, Townsville, Australia
- 2024 PX3 Winners and State of the World, Galerie 24b, Paris, France
- 2024 CLIP Awards, Perth Centre for Photography, Australia
- 2024 Belfast Photo Festival, Northern Ireland
- 2024 Marunouchi Photo Gallery, Tokyo, Japan
- 2023 Vintage Photo Festival, Bydgoszcz, Poland
- 2023 La Luna Bambina, Cavallerizza, Turin, Italy
- 2023 Yarra Ranges Regional Museum, Victoria, Australia
- 2023 Valid World Hall Gallery, Barcelona, Spain
- 2023 FotoZA Gallery, Johannesburg, South Africa
- 2023 Pictura Gallery, Bloomington, US
- 2023 The David Roche Foundation House Museum, Adelaide, South Australia
- 2023 Noosa Regional Gallery, Queensland, Australia
- 2022 Head On Photo Festival, Sydney
- 2022 National Photographic Portrait Prize (National Portrait Gallery of Australia)
- 2022 Riaperture, Ferrara, Italy
- 2022 Photoville, New York City
- 2022 Wyndham Art Prize, Melbourne
- 2022 OptiKA, Kingston Arts Centre, Melbourne
- 2021 Ilford CCP Salon, Centre for Contemporary Photography, Melbourne

== Awards ==
- Siena International Photo Awards, 2025 – Creative Photographer of the Year
- Xposure International Photography Awards, 2025 – Portrait Runner-up
- International Photography Awards, 2024 – Book/Fine Art Winner
- Prix de la Photographie Paris (Px3), 2024 – Book Photographer of the Year
- Belfast Photo Festival, 2024 – Photo Book Winner
- Percival Photographic Portrait Prize, 2024 – Finalist
- Josephine Ulrick and Win Schubert Photography Award, 2024 – Finalist
- Photometria Awards, 2024 – Finalist
- CLIP Award, 2024 – Finalist
- Tokyo International Foto Awards, 2003 – Book/Fine Art Winner
- Px3 (Prix de la Photographie, Paris), 2023 – Fine Art/People Winner
- Hasselblad Masters, 2023 – Portrait Finalist
- Analog Sparks, International Film Photography Awards, 2023 – Fine Art/Conceptual Winner
- International Photography Awards, 2022 – 1st place / Analog / Film/Portrait
- Tokyo International Foto Awards, 2022 – Fine Art Winner
- Fine Art Photo Awards, 2022 – Conceptual Category Winner
- ND Awards, 2022 – Fine Art/Conceptual Winner
- Life Framer Award, Youthhood, 2022 – 2nd Prize
- Australian Photography Magazine Photographer of the Year, 2021 – Overall Winner, Portrait Category Winner
- Capture Magazine Australasia's Top Emerging Photographer, 2022 – Portrait Category Winner, Overall Runner-up
- Bluethumb Art Prize, 2021 – Photography Category Runner-up
- National Portrait Photographic Prize 2022 – Finalist
- Kuala Lumpur International Photographic Prize 2022 – Finalist
- Wyndham Art Prize, 2022 – Finalist
- IMA Next, Japan, 2022 – Finalist
- OptiKA Award, 2022 – Finalist
