= National Photographic Portrait Prize =

Australian art prize

The National Photographic Portrait Prize is an annual portraiture competition held at the National Portrait Gallery in Canberra, Australia.

The major sponsor of the prize in 2022 is the gallery itself, which awards A$30,000 to the winner, while Canon provides camera equipment worth over A$20,000.

== Past winners ==
- 2007 — Robert Scott-Mitchell
- 2009 — Ingvar Kenne
- 2010 — Scott Bycroft
- 2011 — Jacqueline Mitelman
- 2012 — Roderick McNicol
- 2013 — Janelle Low
- 2014 — Andrew Cowe
- 2015 — Hoda Afshar
- 2016 — Elizabeth Looker
- 2017 — Gary Grealy
- 2018 — Lee Grant
- 2019 — Alana Holmberg
- 2020 — Rob Palmer
- 2021 — Joel B. Pratley
- 2022 — Wayne Quilliam
- 2023 — Shea Kirk
- 2024 — Amos Gebhardt
- 2025 — Hoda Afshar, for "Untitled #01 (from the series Code Black/Riot)"
- 2026 — Nathan Beard

== Highly Commended ==
- 2014 — David Apostol
- 2015 — Katherine Williams
- 2016 — Sean Davey
- 2017 — John Benavente; Brett Canet-Gibson
- 2018 — Filomena Rizzo
- 2019 — Alex Vaughan
- 2020 — Hugh Stewart
- 2021 — Julian Kingma
- 2022 — Adam Ferguson
- 2023 — Renae Saxby

== People's Choice ==
- 2012 — John McRae
- 2015 — Natalie Grono
- 2016 — Matthew Newton
- 2017 — Brett Canet-Gibson
- 2018 — Harold David
- 2019 — Kate Atkinson
- 2020 — Klarissa Dempsey
- 2022 — Luther Tora
- 2023 — Bruce Agnew
- 2025 — Em Jensen

== Art Handlers' Award ==
- 2017 — Tobias Titz
- 2018 — Stephanie Simcox
- 2019 — Elizabeth Looker
- 2020 — Shea Kirk
- 2021 — Kristina Kraskov
- 2022 — Adam Haddrick
- 2023 — David Cossini
- 2025 — George Fetting
- 2026 — Hussein Abdirahman Mohamud

== First Time Finalist Award ==
- 2025 — Sherry Quiambao
- 2026 — Phuong Nguyen Le

== Notable exhibiting finalists ==
- Nigel Brennan
- Jane Burton
- Rozalind Drummond
- Alex Frayne
- Trent Parke
- James J. Robinson
- Andrew Rovenko
- Robin Sellick
- Dean Sewell
- Alexia Sinclair
- Mark Tedeschi
- Mia Wasikowska
- Greg Weight
- Anne Zahalka
