= Head On Photo Festival =

Annual photography festival based in Sydney, Australia

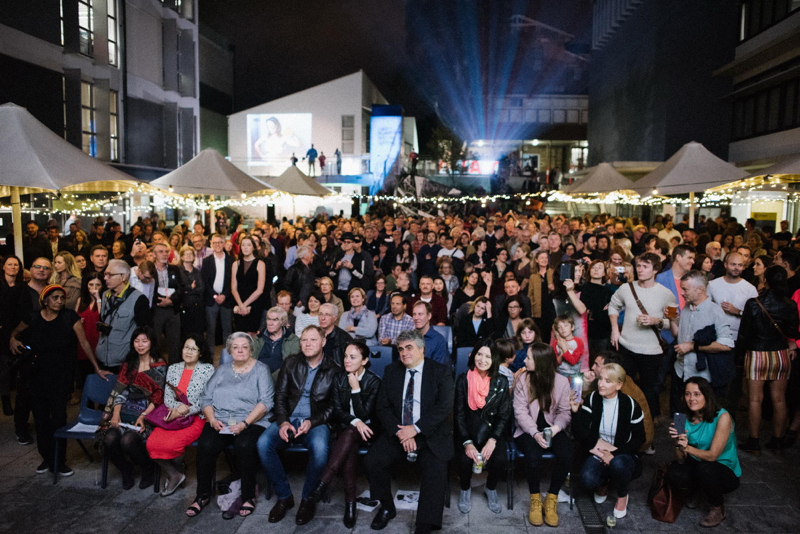
Head On Photo Festival launch 2017

Head On Photo Festival is an international annual photography festival based in Sydney, Australia, showing emerging and established photo-artists. It was founded in 2004 by Moshe Rosenzveig OAM with the first Head On Portrait Award. The Festival is held across multiple venues, including public and commercial galleries as well as public outdoor spaces.

The Festival and its flagship exhibition, Head On Photo Awards, are run by the non-profit organisation, Head On Foundation (established 2008).

== Details ==
All work submitted to the Festival and the Awards are judged without the artists' names attached, ensuring the work is selected on merit alone.

The annual photography Festival is held in various venues across Sydney, with outdoor exhibitions at Paddington Reservoir Gardens and along Bondi Beach in Sydney.

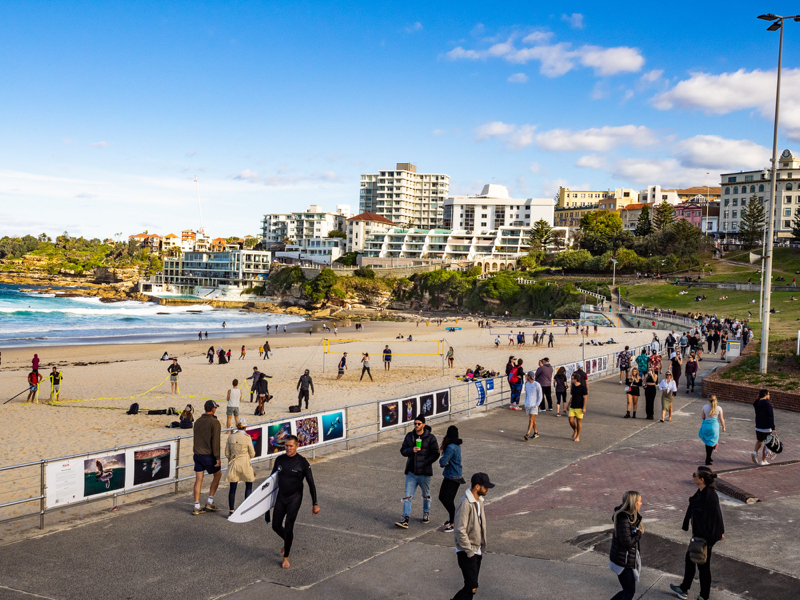
Head On Photo Festival at Bondi Beach, Sydney, July 2020

Head On Photo Festival has exhibited work by Australian and international photographers. In 2012, the Festival premiered the exhibition and book (Based On a True Story) by David Alan Harvey at the Australian Centre for Photography and exhibited Burn in Print at Bondi Pavilion with work by James Nachtwey, Davide Monteleone, Laura El Tantawy and others. In 2013, Head On collaborated with New York gallery, Yossi Milo Gallery to exhibit Doug Rickard and Tim Hetherington's work at Stills Gallery, Sydney. In 2013 Head On exhibited iAfghanistan at the State Library of NSW by Benjamin Lowy who works with mobile phone, plastic camera and cutting edge DSLR. In 2014, 2016 and 2017 Head On Photo Festival included exhibitions of Christian Thompson AO at Michael Reid Gallery. In 2016 Head On exhibited Hendrik Kerstens and Erwin Olaf at Customs House with their exhibition Dutch Masters of Light and Roger Ballen's Theatre of the Mind at Sydney College of the Arts gallery. The 2016 Festival also premiered the exhibition The Lost Rolls by American photojournalist Ron Haviv and a show by German photographer, Sven Marquardt of Berlin's nightclub, Berghain. In 2017 the Festival premiered the exhibition Secret Garden of Lily La Palma by Maggie Steber at UNSW Art and Design. Another exhibition from Head On Photo Festival 2017, was Targets by German photographer Herlinde Koelbl at Paddington Reservoir Gardens.

== Head On Photo Festival 2025 ==
Head On Photo Festival 2025, now in its 16th year, launches on 7 November, with the announcements of winners of the prestigious Head On Photo Awards, sharing a $80,000 prize pool and the inaugural $5,000 Mayor of Waverley's Prize for a single exhibition. It also premieres the controversial film The Stringer.

== Head On(line) Photo Festival 2020 ==
In 2020, Head On became the first photography festival in the world to be delivered entirely online due to the effects of the COVID-19 pandemic.

The online Festival featured a selection of free exhibitions, artist talks, panel discussions and webinars. A highlight of Head On(line) Photo Festival was Paper Tigers, an exhibition featuring 60 images from 60 of Australia's leading photojournalists.

The Festival was opened virtually by Osher Gunsberg. The Festival itself attracted 80,000 visits from 148 countries.

== Head On Photo Awards ==
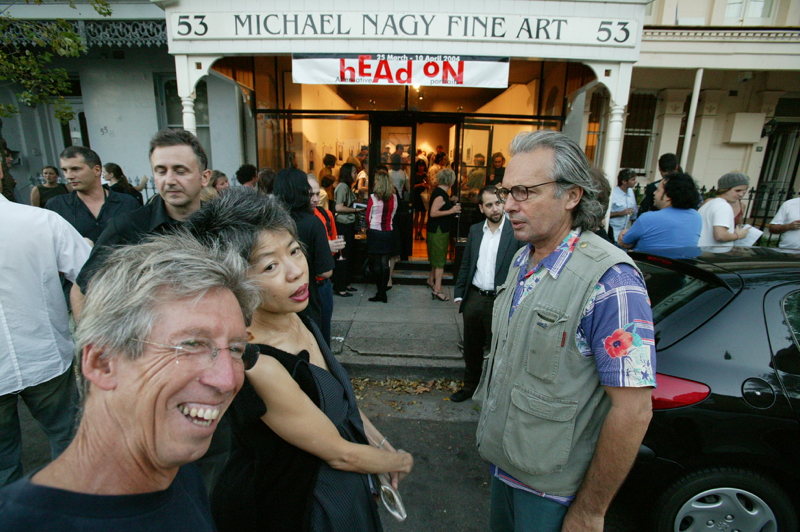
First Head On Portrait Prize opening event, 2004. Front row: Ian Lever, SBS TV broadcaster Lee Lin Chin, photographer Jon Lewis

The Head On Photo Awards represents photography across Portrait and Landscape categories. The Head On Student Award is open to Australian primary and secondary school students. In 2020, the total prize pool was valued at A$70,000, including two cash prizes of A$15,000 each. Since its inception in 2004, Head On Foundation distributed over A$800,000 in cash and products as prizes.

Head On Photo Awards included a prize for images produced on a mobile-device until 2019. Mobile photography is no longer its own category, but is incorporated into the other categories.

Introduced in 2023, the Head On Environmental Awards by Australian Geographic celebrates the power of photography to capture and provoke reflection on our world and our place in it, inspiring action and driving positive change for our planet.

The esteemed 2023 international judging panel of the Head On Photo Awards included Aline Smithson, Bill Shapiro, Gwen Lee, James Whitlow Delano, Jasmine Robertson, Jesse Marlow, Jessica Hromas, Krishna Sheth, Laura Moore, Moshe Rosenzveig OAM, Natan Dvir, and Nicky Catley.

=== Winners ===
- 2005: Samantha Everton, Anthony Browell, Stephen Dupont
- 2006: Greg Weight, Patricia Casey, Sally McInerney
- 2007: Stephen Dupont, Thuy Vy, Matthew Duchesne, Neil Wallace
- 2008: Brendan Esposito, Richard Kendall, Tobias Titz
- 2009: Janyon Boschoff, Vincent Long, Gary Heery
- 2010: Gil Meydan, Karl Schwerdtfeger, Fiona Wolf
- 2011: Stephen Dupont, Shauna Greyerbiehl, Katrin Koenning
- 2012: Chris Budgeon, David Manley, Tracey Nearmy, Louise Whelan
- 2013: Jonathan May, Brian Casey, Matthew Reed, Tim Levy
- 2014: Joe Wigdahl (Portrait Award), Nick Hannes (Landscape Award), Andrew Quilty (Mobile Award)
- 2015: Molly Harris (Portrait Award), Alfonso Perez de Velasco (Landscape Award), Laki Sideris (Mobile Award), Paul Philpott (Student Award)
- 2016 : Antonio Heredia (Portrait Award), David Chancellor (Landscape Award), Ako Salemi (Mobile Award), Isabelle Sijan (Student Award)
- 2017: Cesar Dezfuli (Portrait Award), Todd Kennedy (Landscape Award), Demetris Koilalous (Mobile Award), Sophie Smith (Student Award)
- 2018: Irmina Walczak & Sávio Freire (Portrait Award), Roger Grasas (Landscape Award), Zay Yar Lin (Mobile Award), Hi Yin Chan (Student Award)
- 2019: Juliet Taylor (Portrait Award), Bruce Haswell (Landscape Award), Mel Meek (Mobile Award), Aimee Sluga (Student Award)
- 2020: Fiona Wolf-Symeonides (Portrait Award), Marcia Macmillan (Landscape Award), Joel Parkinson (Student Award)
- 2021: Gideon Mendel (Portrait Award), Aletheia Casey (Landscape Award), Chege Mbuthi (Student Award)
- 2022: Marika Lortkipanidze (Portrait Award), Antoine Buttafoghi (Landscape Award), Leila Middleton (Student Award)
- 2023: David Cossini (Portrait Award), Talia Greis (Landscape Award), Alain Schroeder (Environmental Award), Lucia St Leon (Student Award)
- 2024: Drew Gardner (Portrait Award), Kinga Wrona (Landscape Award), Antonio Denti (Exposure Award)
- 2025: Lívia Peres (Portrait Award), Liam Man (Landscape Award), Abdelrahman Alkahlout (Exposure Award)

== Collaborations and tours ==
Head On has worked with many galleries, museums, festivals and arts organisations both in Australia and internationally. Head On Photo Festival presented the exhibition Spy/Spy, a cross look at the Cannes Film Festival, at Casula Powerhouse Arts Centre. In 2016 and 2017 the Head On Portrait Awards were exhibited at the Museum of Sydney.

In 2018 former curator of the National Gallery of Australia, Gael Newton and Paul Costigan curated an exhibition of Frank Hurley's life and work at the Manly Art Gallery and Museum.

Head On has also presented exhibitions in collaboration with the Australian National Maritime Museum, Sydney Film Festival, University of Technology, Royal Botanic Gardens, Stills Gallery, Yossi Milo Gallery (New York) and the State Library of NSW.

The Festival has toured internationally to the US, China, India, Holland and New Zealand, featuring in international festivals such as; Photoville, Auckland Photo Festival, Indian Photography Festival, Ballarat International Foto Biennale, International Photo Festival Leiden, Vivid Sydney, Pingyao International Photography Festival and Photo Beijing. Head On collaborated annually between 2020-2024 with the Royal College of Music, London, to create new musical works inspired by images from the Head On Photo Awards.
