= Héverton =

Héverton is a given name. It may refer to:

- Héverton (footballer, born 1985), Héverton Durães Coutinho Alves, Brazilian football attacking midfielder
- Héverton (footballer, born 1988), Héverton Cardoso da Silva, Brazilian football centre-back

== See also ==
- Everton (disambiguation)
