= Alexia Sinclair =

Australian photographer (born 1976)

- Born: Alexia Anne Sinclair; 1976 (age 49–50); Newcastle, New South Wales, Australia
- Education: National Art School
- Known for: Photography
- Website: alexiasinclair.com

Alexia Sinclair (born 1976) is an Australian fine-art photographer. She studied Fine Arts in Sydney at The National Art School (1995–1998). She majored in traditional photography and her studies in painting, drawing, sculpture, and art history were all influential to her work. She completed a Master of Fine Arts at the University of Newcastle (2007).

== Early life ==
Sinclair was born in Newcastle, New South Wales, Australia. In high school, Sinclair became interested in various artistic endeavours, studied ballet for over ten years, and has used it as a source for the large amount of role-play in her work. Sinclair attended the National Art School where she studied drawing, painting, sculpture, and photography. Sinclair has attributed a lot of her creative success to her upbringing in her family restaurant, where she finds meditation in cooking.

== Career ==
Sinclair has exhibited in numerous galleries and museums including, but not limited to, the Art Gallery of New South Wales, the National Portrait Gallery and the Australian Centre for Photography. Her series The Regal Twelve in the Phantasia exhibition has toured to the Samstag Museum (University of South Australia, 2009), and the Biennale in Paris of 2009 where it exhibited at the Australian Embassy. Her MFA series went on to win several national awards. The series celebrated the lives of twelve powerful women in history through over 2,000 plates of medium format film through hand illustration and digital montage. Overall, it took three years to finish the series.

In 2009, Sinclair exhibited alongside William Yang and Trent Parke at the Pingyao International Photography Festival.

Sinclair's series 'A Frozen Tale', includes a set of photographs from within the Royal Palace of Stockholm in Skokloster Slott. It is on the frozen Lake Mälaren, and is considered the finalist examples of Baroque architecture in all of Europe. Inside of the palace, there is a large collection of rare books, artworks, and weaponry. To ensure that everything inside stays conserved, she added atmospheric elements that are typical of a life in a 17th-century castle, like smoke of large fireplaces or the geese of a castle kitchen. These artworks were exhibited in festivals in Seoul and Dubai.

== Television appearances ==
On 7 June 2009, the ABC's Sunday Arts covered a story on the exhibition Phantasia curated by Alasdair Foster, the then Director of the Australian Centre for Photography. In August 2010, the ABC's Art Nation covered a story on Alexia Sinclair.

== Awards ==
- The National Photographic Portrait Prize – Archibald (2006)
- Winner: The Regal Twelve suite
- Harpers BAZAAR Canon Fashion Photography Award (2007)
- The National Tertiary Art Prize (2007)
- The Newton-John Award (2007)
- Nominated by the Australian Centre for Photography to represent Australia at the Paul Huf 2010 Award
- Nominee: FOAM Paul Huf Award (2010)
- Winner: Gold Award – Macbeth
- Graphis 100 Best in Photography (2011)
- Shortlisted Finalist: Selected Work Napoleon I — Emperor of the French
- National Photographic Portrait Prize (2011)
- Hasselblad Masters Finalist (2012) – Finalist
- Olive Cotton Award (2013) – Finalist
- Citigroup's 2006 Photographic Portrait Prize Art Gallery of NSW – Finalist
- Harpers BAZAAR Canon Fashion Photography Award (2007) – Winner
- Graphis 100 Best in Photography (2011)
- Australian National Photographic Portrait Prize (2011) – Finalist
- Hasselblad Masters (2012) – Finalist
