= Katrin Koenning =

German-born Australian photojournalist and photographer (born 1978)

- Born: 1978 (age 47–48); Dortmund, Germany
- Known for: Photography
- Website: www.katrinkoenning.com

Katrin Koenning (born 1978) is a German-born Australian photographer and videographer whose work has been exhibited and published since 2007.

== Early life and education ==
Koenning was born and grew up in Bochum, a city in North Rhine-Westphalia where she was educated in a Steiner school. In 2003, aged twenty-five, she moved to Australia where her father and aunt had emigrated in the late 1990s. She studied documentary photography, gaining a Bachelor of Photography with High Distinction at the Queensland College of Art, Griffith University, Brisbane, during which she achieved Academic Excellence Awards in 2004, 2005 and 2006, and which she completed in 2007.

== Photographer ==
Koenning took up photography after the death in a plane crash of a close friend. During 2007 to 2008 she was Picture Editor for Picturing Human Rights and Tell My Story, publications of the Australian PhotoJournalist Magazine and in 2009 to 2010 Editor of their Silent Screams: Rights of the Child. Koenning's photo essays have been published in newspapers and magazines, including The New Yorker, FT Magazine, British Journal of Photography, The Guardian,Human Rights Defender, The New York Times, Der Spiegel, The Independent, and SBS Australia.

Koenning works in series and is globally peripatetic yet adopts "an embedded vantage point [in] an ongoing concern for documenting scarred, wounded, and transitioning landscapes.": Lake Mountain (2010–2018) distills into a triptych imagery from return visits over a decade to evidence the effects of the 2009 Black Saturday bushfires; The Crossing (2009–2017) is a long-form work in stills and video concerned with human impact on Australian ecology; Pott (2012–2018) details indications of post-industrial transition through places and people of Koenning's birthplace the Ruhr; Loraine and the Illusion of Illoura (2010–2012) documents road trips in Australia; Transit (2007–2014) features portraits of seated travelers lost in thought or sleep; Thirteen: Twenty Lacuna (2009–2011) uses seemingly cinematic, ambient lighting to momentarily spotlight Melbourne city pedestrians; Dear Chris (2012–2013) is a personal encounter with the apprehension and aftermath of suicide; the digital video Collisions (2015–2017) is compiled from brief fragments from mobile photo footage; Indefinitely shot between Australia and her native Germany over eight years, presents the condition of a geographically separated family; two series, Midnight in Prahran begun in 2012, and Four Lakes, commenced in Kolkata in 2017, are ongoing location-specific place narratives on non-human human interconnectivity and intimate entanglement; Rausch (2016–2018) visually interprets the experience of chronic tinnitus; and Swell is concerned with Australian government interference in, and resistance to, climate activism targeting the Adani company's Carmichael Coal Mine.

== Reception ==
In reviewing The Crossing Ella Mudie identifies Koenning's approach;

By returning to the same environments where she situates herself in the landscape, waiting and watching for moments to unfold, Koenning suggests that "it's through immersion that I can be part of a land." What emerges over time from this immersion in place in Koenning's practice is photography as a process of worlding. In The Crossing there is a sense in which each photograph offers a miniature portrait of a natural world on the cusp of disappearance. At the same time, there is ambiguity at play, especially in Koenning's arresting images of fish and bird life hovering between states of appearance and disappearance, or processes of emergence and withdrawal.

The book Astres Noirs, Koenning's first, was the result of distributing her work using social media. On Instagram, Sarker Protick in Bangladesh and Koenning in Australia shared hundreds of photographs. Co-directors of publishers Chose Commune, Cécile Poimboeuf-Koizumi and Vasantha Yogananthan, following the two artists on social networks, noticed artistic affinities in dialogue that banished distance. In their studio in Paris, far removed from Bangladesh and Australia, they developed a book concept that replicated the illumination of the mobile phone screen and its constant flow of imagery;

On black paper the pages [are] printed in silver ink with traces of a harsh and blinding light originally generated by the smartphone. Thus, the light of the images is not white, but a metallic gray, paradoxically evoking the essential material of film photography: silver salt. From an all-digital universe, the photographs of Protick and Koenning retain the luminance of the screen thanks to the unusual printing process that transforms them into a malleable material from which the photographic narrative is constructed. Bound in a sort of Japanese fold (each of the pages is double, folded on itself from the top), the book is punctuated with "hidden" images, printed on the inside of the fold.

As José Alberto Caro Díaz expresses it;

German photographer Katrin Koenning and Bangladesh-based photographer Sarker Protick collaborate despite distance. This work represents photographs taken with a mobile phone camera, capturing the ordinary like a drop of water or a ray of light, and transforming it, discovering an unexplored world [and] show a passion for the world that surrounds them.

Dan Rule introduces an interview with Koenning with a summary of her series Indefinitely

The images that populate Katrin Koenning’s long-running series Indefinitely read as if a syntax of transient moments and fleeting extracts. Shot between Australia, New Zealand and her native Germany over eight years, they waver between the lucid and dreamlike, spanning continents and oceans, cities and forests, crystalline visions and elusive flashes of happenstance. That the Melbourne-based photographer’s family and the vast distances which separate its protagonists underpin Indefinitely says much about these images, which might otherwise seem disparate at a glance.

== Photographic educator ==
Koenning started her teaching career in Journalism, Journalistic Investigation and Reporting at the University of Queensland in 2008 and has since presented lectures, artist talks, workshops and conference papers in Australia, Bangladesh (2017), Germany (2015, 2018, 2019), Cambodia (2017), New Zealand (2018), and elsewhere.

She has taught in a number of national and international institutions: in 2016 at Anjali Children's workshop, Angkor Photo Festival, Cambodia; at the Australian Centre for Photography Workshop Intensive; Centre for Contemporary Photography, Melbourne (2018), Photo Kathmandu, Nepal (2018); Angkor Photo Workshops, Siem Reap Cambodia (2019); Myanmar Deitta, Yangon Myanmar (2019); University of Tasmania (2020); University of Applied Arts Vienna (2020); Pathshala South Asian Media Institute, Dhaka Bangladesh (2020); and as a lecturer in Bachelor of Arts Photography courses at RMIT University (2020) and Photography Studies College (2013–2017, 2020, 2021)

== Personal life ==
In 2009 she moved from Brisbane to live and work in Naarm Melbourne.

== Publications ==
=== Books by Koenning ===
- Between the Skin and Sea. Chose Commune, 2024. ISBN 979-1096383481.

=== Other ===
- Koenning, Katrin; Pentagon, Atelier; Artisans du Regard (2016). Poimbœuf-Koizumi, Cécile; Yogananthan, Vasantha; Rolet, Léa; Silvey, Tamsin (eds.). Astres noirs. Protick, Sarker (photographer) (First ed.). Chose Commune. ISBN 978-2-9548777-2-3.
- Breckon, Katie; Koenning, Katrin; Griffiths, Katherine; Eaton, Jackson; Kochanowska, Belinda; Borissova, Julia (2014). Breckon, Katrin Koenning, Katherine Griffiths, Jackson Eaton, Belinda Kochanowska, Julia Borissova, QUT International College / Queensland Centre for Photography. Queensland Centre for Photography.

== Awards ==
- 2010: Troika Editions Format Exposure Prize, London
- 2011: HeadOn Portrait Prize, Critic's Choice Award, selected by Robert McFarlane, for her image, Sleeping Woman. She shared it with Shauna Greyerbiehl, Stephen Dupont and James Brickwood in a prize pool of over $50,000
- 2014: People's Choice, Bowness Photography Prize
- 2016: Shortlisted, Prix Nadar for Astres Noirs
- 2016: Shortlisted, First Book Award, Paris Photo–Aperture Foundation PhotoBook Awards, for Astres Noirs
- 2017: 2016 Australian and New Zealand Photobook of the Year Award, for Astres Noirs
- 2019: William and Winifred Bowness Photography Prize

== Exhibitions ==
=== Solo exhibitions ===
- 2012: From a Changed North, Head On Photo Festival, MiCK Gallery, Sydney, Australia
- 2015: Indefinitely, Athens Photo Festival, Greece
- 2015: Fieber, PhotoIreland, Ireland
- 2017: Dear Chris, Chobi Mela International Photography Festival, Dhaka Bangladesh
- 2017: Indefinitely, Organ Vida Festival, Galerija Kranjčar, Zagreb Croatia (Supported by Goethe-Institut and the Australian Embassy)
- 2017: Astres Noirs, Paris Photo | East Wing Gallery, Paris France
- 2018: The Crossing, Hamburg Triennial of Photography, Deichtorhallen Hamburg, Germany
- 2019: Swell, Monash Gallery of Art, Melbourne Australia
- 2019: The Crossing, Myanmar Deitta, Yangon Myanmar
- 2021: the kids are in trouble, Chennai Photo Biennale, India

=== Group exhibitions ===
- 2016 – The Crossing, CCP Declares: On the Social Contract, Centre for Contemporary Photography, Melbourne Australia
- 2016 – The Crossing, Transfer, Australian Centre for Photography, Sydney Australia

== Collections ==
Koenning's work is held in the following permanent collection:

- Monash Gallery of Art
