= Hoda Afshar =

Iranian photographer (born 1983)

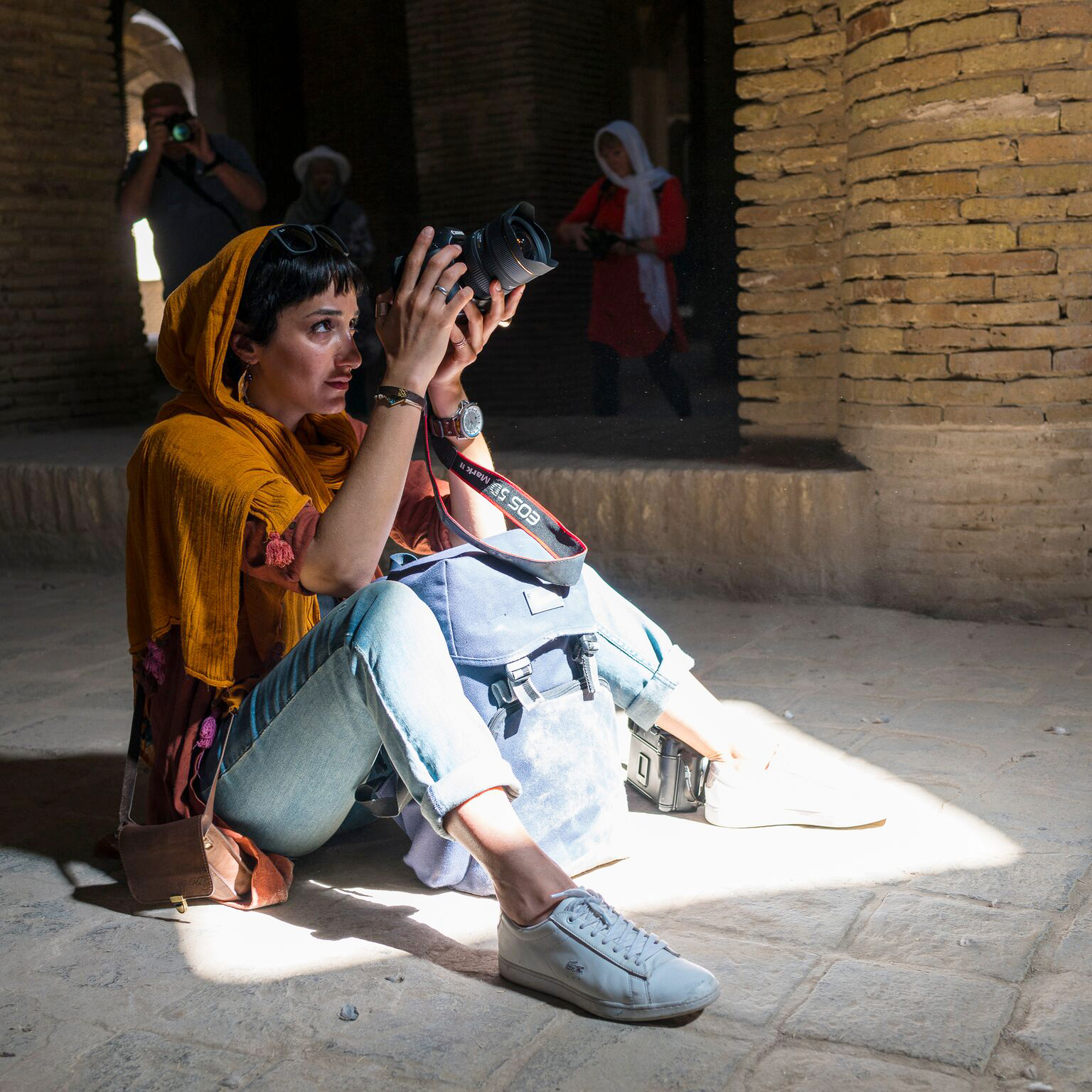
- Born: 1983 (age 42–43); Tehran
- Known for: documentary photography
- Notable work: Remain (2018)
- Awards: National Photographic Portrait Prize (2015), Bowness Photography Prize (2018)
- Website: hodaafshar.com

Hoda Afshar (born 1983) is an Iranian documentary photographer who is based in Melbourne. She is known for her 2018 prize-winning portrait of Kurdish-Iranian refugee Behrouz Boochani, who suffered a long imprisonment in the Manus Island detention centre run by the Australian government. Her work has been featured in many exhibitions and is held in many permanent collections across Australia.

Since 2019 and as of 2023 Afshar teaches at the Victorian College of the Arts and Photography Studies College in Melbourne.

== Early life and education ==
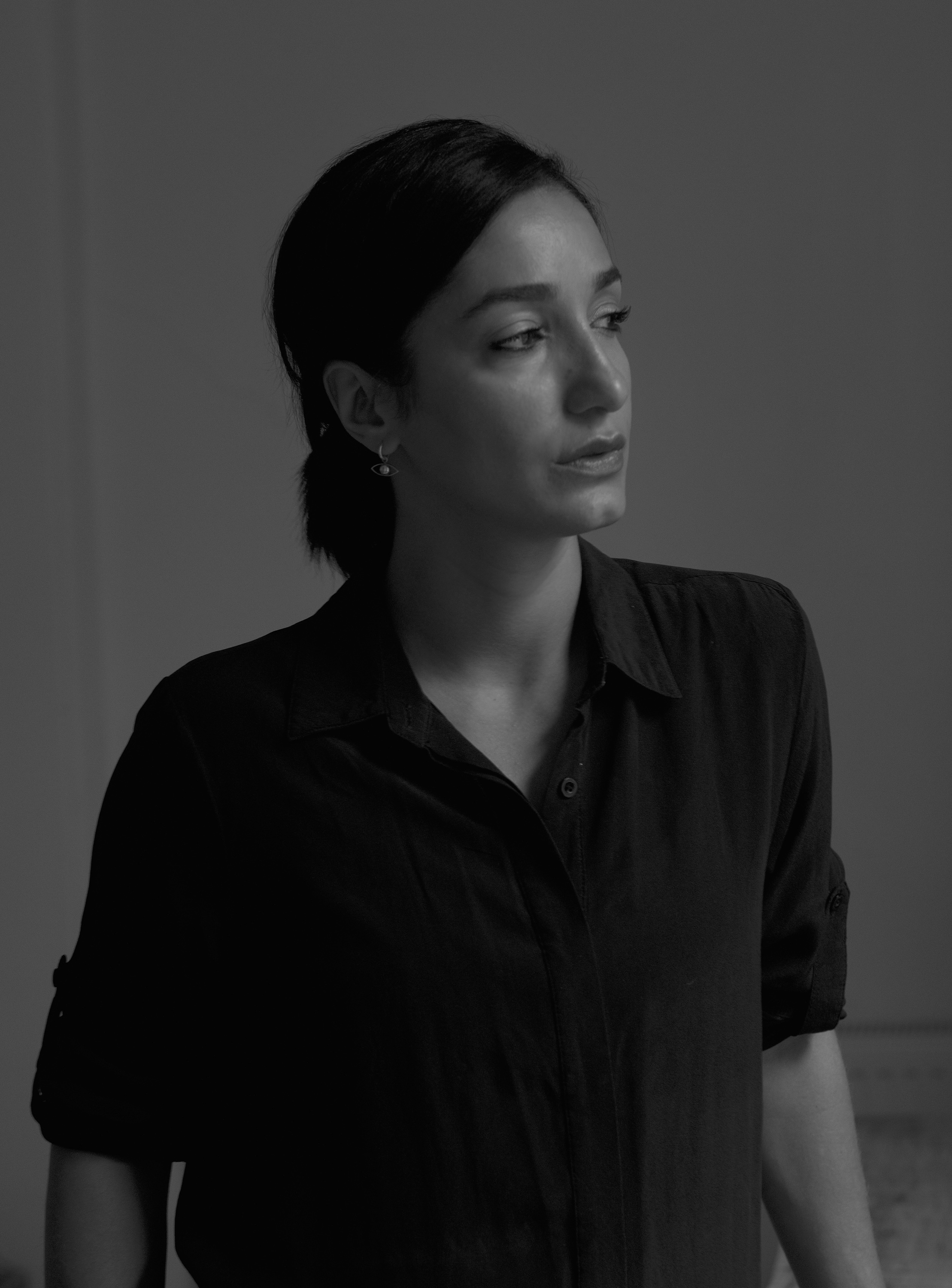

Hoda Afshar was born in Tehran, Iran, in 1983, four years after the Iranian Revolution.

Initially hoping to study theatre and become an actor, she was only granted her second choice, photography, at university. She earned a bachelor's degree in fine art (photography) with first class honours at the Azad University of Art and Architecture in Tehran. During her studies and subsequently, she photographed many of her friends' theatre performances, coming to realise that photography was essentially theatrical too.

== Career ==
Afshar's first project, in 2005, was a series of black and white photographs documenting Tehran's underground parties, called Scene, but she could not show them in public. From 2005 to 2006, Afshar worked as a photojournalist for Hamvatan newspaper in Tehran.

She moved to Australia in 2007, and in the same year completed a course at University of Technology Sydney, "Photojournalism Essential". In 2009 she completed a fine art diploma in photography and sculpture at the Meadowbank TAFE in Sydney.

From 2013 to 2021 Afshar lectured at the Photography Studies College in Melbourne.

Her first solo exhibition, Behold (2017, at the Centre for Contemporary Photography in Melbourne), comprised a set of grainy photographs of men in a gay bathhouse taken in Iran in 2016.

Afshar's two-channel video work, Remain (2018), includes spoken poetry by Kurdish-Iranian refugee Behrouz Boochani and Iranian poet Bijan Elahi. Afshar describes her method as "staged documentary", in which the men on the island are able to "re-enact their narratives with their own bodies and [gives] them autonomy to narrate their own stories". The video was shown as part of the Primavera 2018 exhibition at the Museum of Contemporary Art Australia in Sydney, from 9 November 2018 to 3 February 2019. One of the photographs of Boochani taken for this project won the Bowness Photography Prize. This portrait, along with several others taken as part of the Remain project, are held by the Art Gallery of New South Wales.

In 2019 Afshar completed her PhD in creative arts at Curtin University, with the subject of her thesis being "images of Islamic female identity". In 2019 and Afshar started teaching at the Victorian College of the Arts and Photography Studies College in Melbourne.

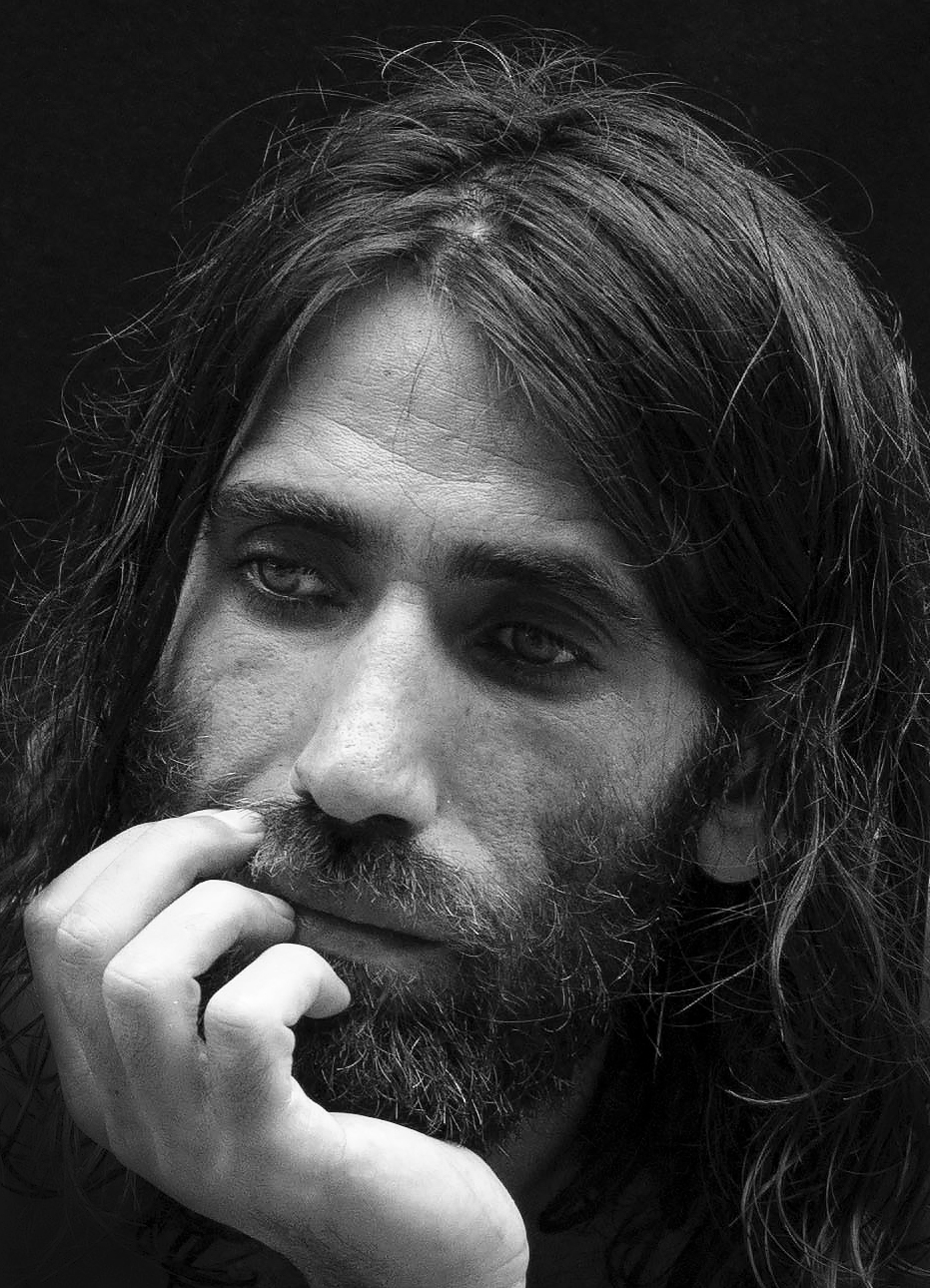
Behrouz Boochani by Afshar

Afshar was the subject of a Compass program on ABC Television in 2019.

Afshar's book Speak the Wind (2021) documents the landscapes and people of the islands of Hormuz, Qeshm, and Hengam, in the Persian Gulf off the south coast of Iran. She got to know some of the people there, travelling there frequently over the years, and they told her about the history of the place. She said that "their narrations led the project", and she explores "the idea of being possessed by history, and in this context, the history of slavery and cruelty".

In March 2021, an exhibition of Afshar's portraits of nine whistleblowers was mounted at St Paul's Cathedral in Melbourne, in an exhibition named Agonistes (after the Greek word agonistes, meaning a person engaged in a struggle).

From September 2023 to January 2024, the Art Gallery of New South Wales mounted an exhibition of Afshar's work over the past decade, A Curve is a Broken Line. It contained several of her earlier works, along with a series of 12 large photographs commissioned by AGNSW, In Turn. The photos featured four Iranian Australian women plaiting one another's hair, and first holding a white dove before releasing it. This is based on a kind of ritualistic practice among Kurdish female fighters before setting out to fight Islamic State. The photographs are a response to the killing of Mahsa Jina Amini in Iran in September 2022. A book of the same name was published to accompany the exhibition.

A solo exhibition of several of her major projects, titled a/part, is being held at the Buxton Contemporary at the University of Melbourne from October 2026 until April 2027. The exhibition includes Remain, Agonistes, and Code Black/Riot, which she created in collaboration with Boochani and Vernon Ah Kee . A new work, titled Shafaq, is premiering in the exhibition. She created it while on a camping trip in the Northern Territory in July, while the US was bombing southern Iran, where her family lives, which she has found very distressing

As of October 2026 Afshar is a member of the board of management of the Centre for Contemporary Photography.<

== Practice and themes ==
Afshar says that her work explores how photographs may be "used or misused by power systems create certain hierarchies between people"; and that "[documentary photography] is a visual language that has been formed and established through the lens of colonisation". Her early understanding of photography as a theatrical art informs her practice, and she collaborates with her subjects, whom she sees as "actors", in a way that gives them agency.

== Awards and recognition ==
- 2015: Finalist, Moran Contemporary Photographic Prize, for Dog's Breakfast
- 2015: Winner, National Photographic Portrait Prize, winner for Portrait of Ali
- 2017: Finalist, Bowness Photography Prize, finalist for Untitled #1
- 2018: Winner, Sotheby's Australia People's Choice Award, for Portrait of Behrouz Boochani, Manus Island
- 2018: Winner, Bowness Photography Prize, for Portrait of Behrouz Boochani, Manus Island
- 2019: Finalist, Olive Cotton Award for Photographic Portraiture, for Portrait of Shamindan & Ramsiyar Manus Island
- 2021: Finalist, Ramsay Art Prize (2021), Art Gallery of South Australia and People's Choice Prize, for Agonistes
- 2021: Winner, Sidney Myer Creative Fellowship, an award of A$160,000 given to mid-career creatives and thought leaders
- 2025: Winner, National Photographic Portrait Prize, for "Untitled #01" (from the series Code Black/Riot)

== Publications ==
- Speak the Wind. London: Mack, 2021. With an essay by Michael Taussig. ISBN 978-1-913620-18-9.

== Selected exhibitions ==
=== Solo ===
- Behold (2017), Centre for Contemporary Photography, Fitzroy, Melbourne
- Remain (2018–2019), consisting of a video and a series of black-and-white portraits, Museum of Contemporary Art Australia, Sydney; University of Queensland Art Museum
- Agonistes (February–March 2021), St Paul's Cathedral, Melbourne
- Speak the Wind (April–May 2022), Monash Gallery of Art, Melbourne. One of a series of official exhibitions of PHOTO 2022: International Festival of Photography, taking place in Melbourne and regional Victoria
- A Curve is a Broken Line (September 2023 – January 2024) Art Gallery of New South Wales
- a/part (October 2026 — April 2027), Buxton Contemporary

=== Group ===
- Primavera (2018), Museum of Contemporary Art Australia
- Enough خلص Khalas: Contemporary Australian Muslim Artists (2018), UNSW Galleries
- Women in Photography 2019: Remedy for Rage (2019), Objectifs
- The Shouting Valley (2019), Gus Fisher Gallery, (2020) The Physics Room
- Just Not Australian (2019), Artspace Visual Arts Centre
- Defining Place/Space: Contemporary Photography from Australia (2019), Museum of Photographic Arts
- Civilization: The Way We Live Now (2019), National Gallery of Victoria
- Refracted Reality (2020), Perth Institute of Contemporary Arts
- f_OCUS (2020), Counihan Gallery
- The Burning World (2020), Bendigo Art Gallery
- Five Acts Of Love (2025), Australian Centre for Contemporary Art

== Collections ==
Afshar's work is held in the following permanent collections:

- National Gallery of Victoria: 8 works (as of 27 December 2024)
- Monash Gallery of Art: 8 prints (as of 27 December 2024)
- Art Gallery of New South Wales: 17 prints (as of 27 December 2024)
- Monash University Museum of Art (Behold #1, Behold #6, and Behold #12)
- University of Queensland Art Museum (Remain)
- Murdoch University Art Gallery: (Westoxicated #7, Westoxicated #9, Westoxicated #3, Westoxicated #1, Westoxicated #5, and Westoxicated #4)
- Buxton Contemporary (University of Melbourne) (Westoxicated #1, Westoxicated #2, Westoxicated #4, Westoxicated #5, Westoxicated #6, Westoxicated #7, and Westoxicated #9)
- Deakin University Art Collection
- Art Gallery of Western Australia (Remain)
