= Bowness Photography Prize =

Australian photography prize

The William and Winifred Bowness Photography Prize is an Australian prize for photography awarded by the Museum of Australian Photography. The prize first awarded in 2006. The prize money for the award in 2017 is A$30,000

== History ==
Established in 2006 to promote excellence in photography, the annual William and Winifred Bowness Photography Prize is an initiative of the MGA Foundation.

The Bowness Photography Prize has quickly become Australia's most important photography prize. It is also one of the country's most open prizes for photography. In the past, finalists have included established and emerging photographers, art and commercial photographers. All film-based and digital work from amateurs and professionals is accepted. There are no thematic restrictions. In its first year the winner was awarded $10,000. As the prize grew in prominence the prize money also increased; since 2017 the winner has been awarded $30,000. The winning work is acquired into the Museum of Australian Photography (MAPh) collection.

Each year three Honourable Mentions are also acknowledged, along with the Smith & Singer People's Choice Award of $5,000 which is announced at the end of the exhibition.

The Wai Tang Commissioning Award is an initiative of the MAPh Foundation as part of the Bowness Photography Prize. Paula Mahoney was the first artist selected from the 2021 Bowness Photography Prize to be awarded the $10,000 commission and the second in 2022 was Janelle Low. Their exhibitions coincided with the Bowness Photography Prize exhibition the following year, with one work entering MAPh's significant collection of Australian photographs in honour of Wai Tang’s legacy. The 2023 recipients are The Huxleys (Will Huxley and Garrett Huxley).

Wai Tang served on MAPh’s Committee of Management from 2018 until she died in 2020. Tang’s expertise included more than 30 years of experience in the retail and fashion industries where she held senior executive roles and non-executive directors’ roles in public and private companies. Her commitment to the visual and performing arts was demonstrated through her leadership roles and philanthropic support (and she had a true passion for fashion). The Wai Tang Commissioning Award has been established by her husband, Kee Wong, to recognise and honour her significant impact on the arts and preserve her legacy within MAPh’s collection and exhibition history.

=== 2017 ===
In 2017 the prize money awarded has been increased to $30,000 and for the first time, the winning work will be acquired for the Monash Gallery of Art, City of Monash CollectionI. In 2017 the exhibition included 59 works from 61 artists.

== Prize winners ==
=== 2006 ===
Kathy Mackey with "Reliquary 1" a pigment ink-jet print on cotton paper from an unnamed series of young women juxtaposing human skin with metallic and reflective objects.

=== 2007 ===
Ray Cook with "For God's sake, somebody throw a pie" a gelatin silver print from the series "Oblivion"

=== 2008 ===
Nat Thomas and Concertina Inserra with "Portrait of mother and daughter" a chromogenic print from the series "after Mirka" inspired by the artist Mirka Mora

=== 2009 ===
Paul Knight with "14 months #01" a chromogenic print from an unnamed series of photographs showing couples in sexual embraces from an aerial perspective.

=== 2010 ===
Lee Grant with "Mary with her daughters Aja and Adau, and her granddaughter Nankir" a pigment ink-jet print from the series "New Australians: Sudanese migrants in suburbia"

=== 2011 ===
Jacky Redgate with "Light throw (mirrors) #4" a chromogenic print from the still-life series "Light throw (mirrors) 2010–11"

=== 2012 ===
Jesse Marlow with "Laser vision" a chromogenic print from the street photography series "Don't just tell them, show them"

=== 2013 ===
Pat Brassington with "Shadow boxer" a pigment ink-jet print from the series "Quill"

=== 2014 ===
Petrina Hicks with "Venus" a pigment ink-jet print from the series "The shadows" using portraiture to deal with ideas of beauty and representation in art history.

=== 2015 ===
Joseph McGlennon with "Florilegium #1" a pigment ink-jet print from the series "Florilegium" showing animals in exotic landscapes inspired by naturalist Joseph Banks

=== 2016 ===
Valerie Sparks won $25,000 with "Prospero's Island – North East" a pigment ink-jet print from the series "Prospero's Island", which digitally combined images of Tasmania to become the setting of Shakespeare's "The Tempest".

=== 2017 ===
The winner of the 2017 Bowness Photography prize was announced on 19 October 2017. Polixeni Papapetrou won with her work ‘Delphi’ (2016) a pigment ink-jet print from the series "Eden" depicting young women wearing floral dresses in front of floral backgrounds; merging figure and ground. Three honorable mentions were awarded to Del Kathryn Barton, Danica Chappell and Jenny Pollak.

=== 2018 ===
The winner of the 2018 Bowness Photography prize was announced on 11 October 2018. Melbourne-based, Iranian-born artist Hoda Afshar won for her photograph ‘Portrait of Behrouz Boochani, Manus Island’ (2018) a pigment ink-jet print from the series "Remain". Three honorable mentions were awarded to Shelley Horan, Darren Sylvester and Cyrus Tang.

=== 2019 ===
Katrin Koenning with "Three" a triptych of pigment ink-jet prints from the series "Lake Mountain" showing bushland recovering from bushfires.

=== 2020 ===
Christian Thompson with "Rule of three" four chromogenic prints from the series "Flower walls 2018–" showing the artist immersed in colourful arrangements of Australian native flora.

=== 2021 ===
Lillian O'Neil with "Drawing to a close" a collage of black and white pigment ink-jet prints.

=== 2022 ===
Amos Gebhardt with "Wallaby" a chromogenic print on a light box from an unnamed series of native animal x-rays.

=== 2023 ===
Anne Zahalka with "Kunstkammer" a pigment ink-jet prints on forex, furniture, archival materials, and paper.

=== 2024 ===
Robert Fielding with "Sacred earth/Manta Miil miilpa", an image collage, photosensitive emulsion on cotton paper

=== 2025 ===
Anna Higgins with "Two Horizons", a diptych formed of two mirrored film frames

=== 2026 ===
Tamara Dean with "Metamorphosis", underwater photograph using timer-set camera
