= Casa Ferrario =

Historic building in Milan, Italy

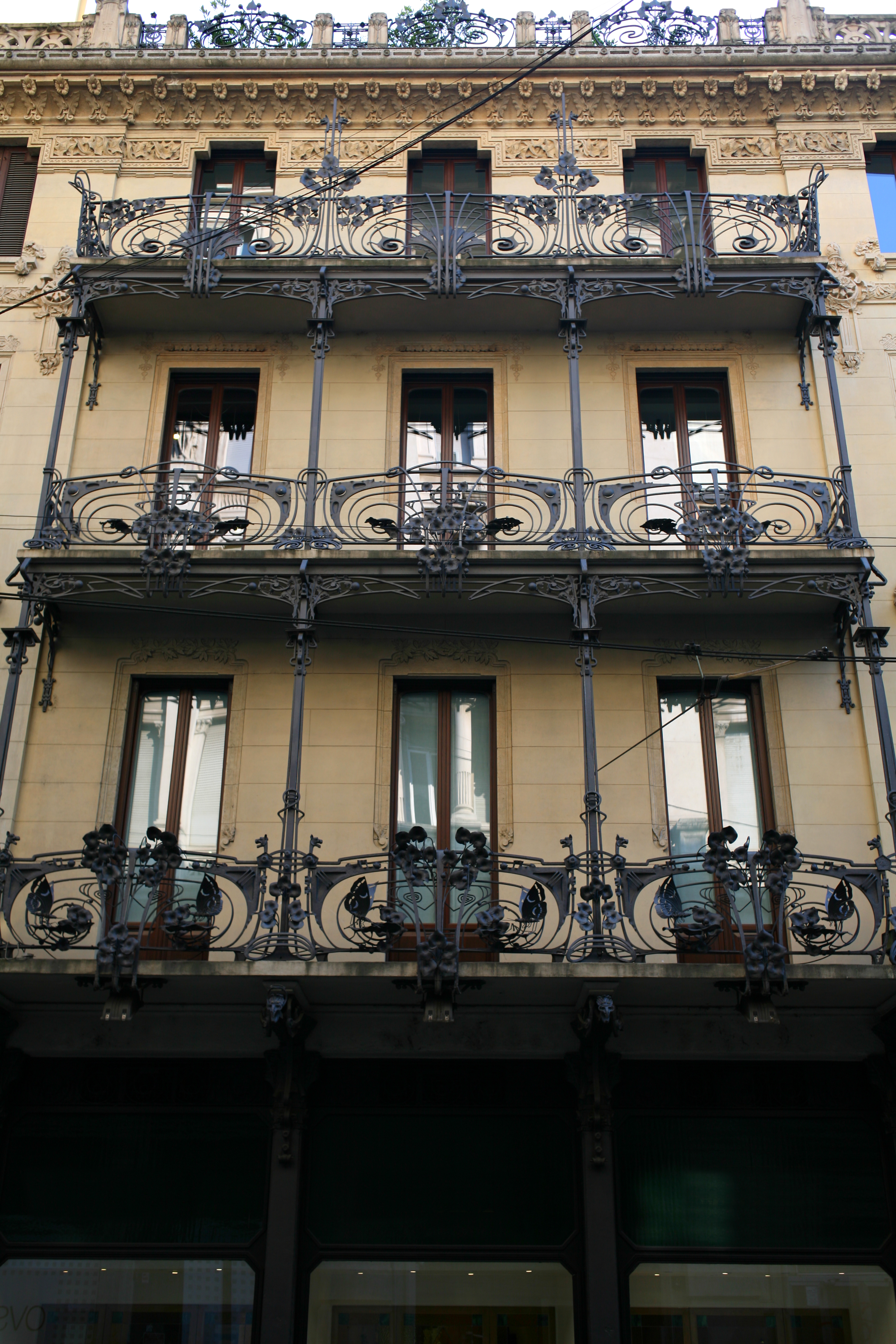
- View of facade with wrought iron balconies

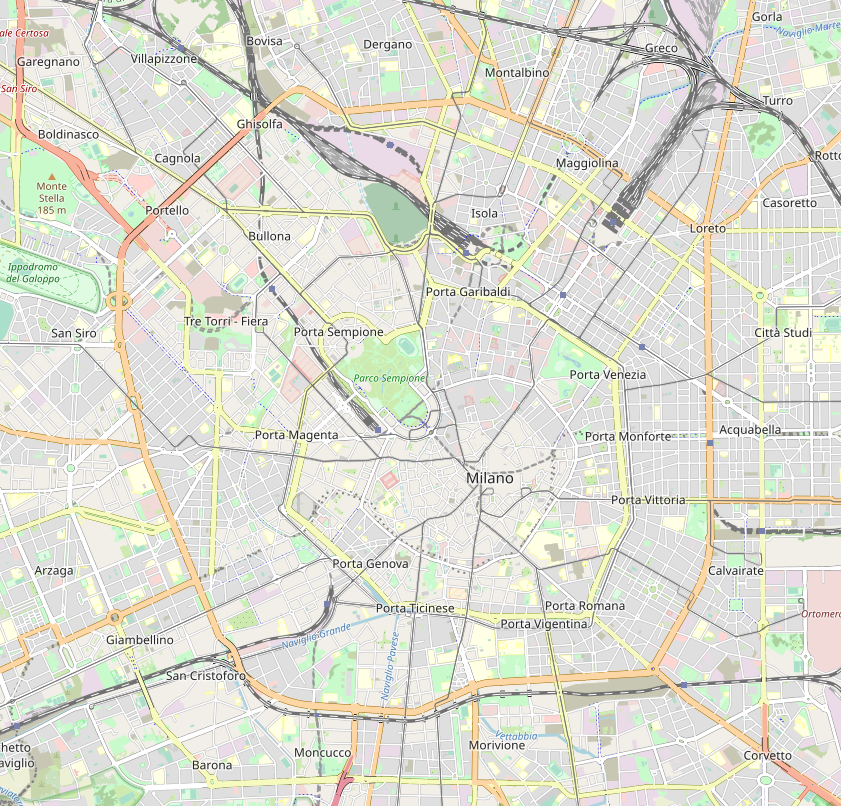
- Location within Milan Location within Italy

General information
- Architectural style: Liberty style or Art Nouveau
- Location: via Spadari #3-5, Milan, Italy
- Coordinates: 45.463400°N 9.187220°E
- Construction started: 1902
- Completed: 1904

Design and construction
- Architect: Ernesto Pirovano

Casa Ferrario is a historic Art Nouveau building located on via Spadari #3-5 in Milan, Italy.

== History ==
It was designed by Ernesto Pirovano in the Liberty style and built between 1902 and 1904.

== Description ==
the building is most notable for the elaborate wrought iron balconies designed and made by Alessandro Mazzucotelli with floral and butterfly motifs. The interior stairwell is also made with wrought iron. The top floor has a frieze of fallen leaves. The four story apartment complex rises alongside the Casa Vanoni and facing the Casa dell'Unione Cooperativa.

== Gallery ==
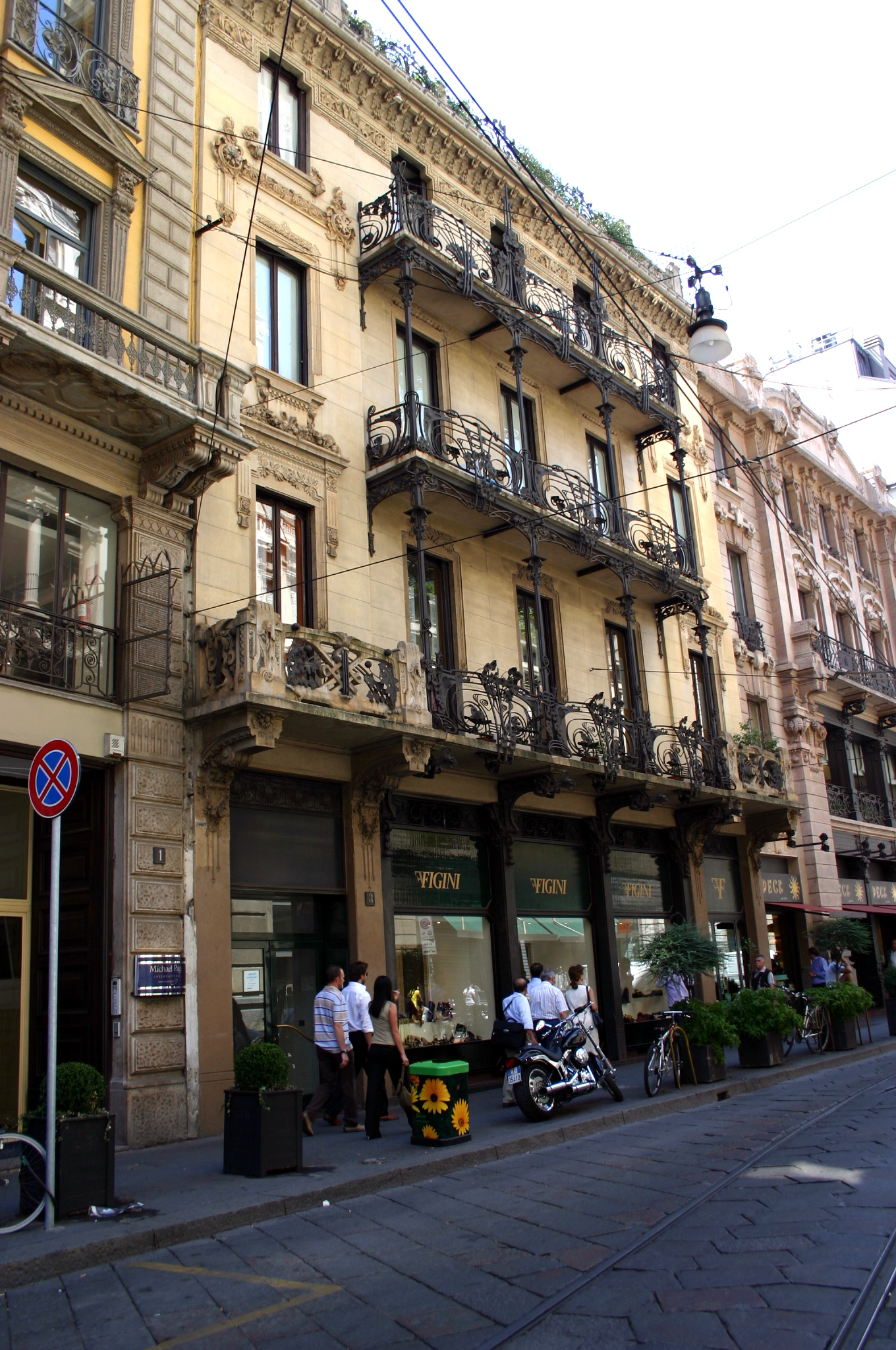

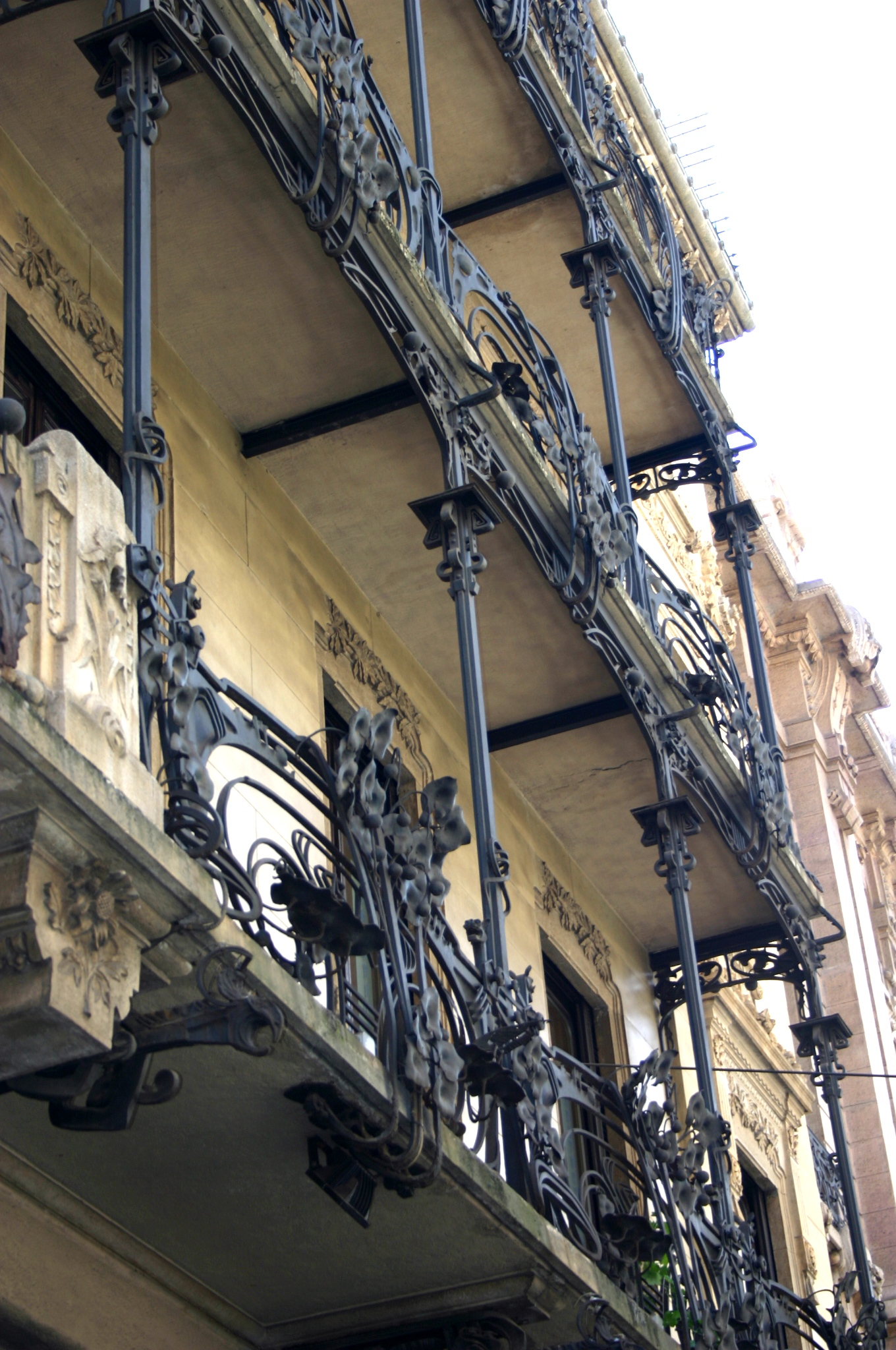

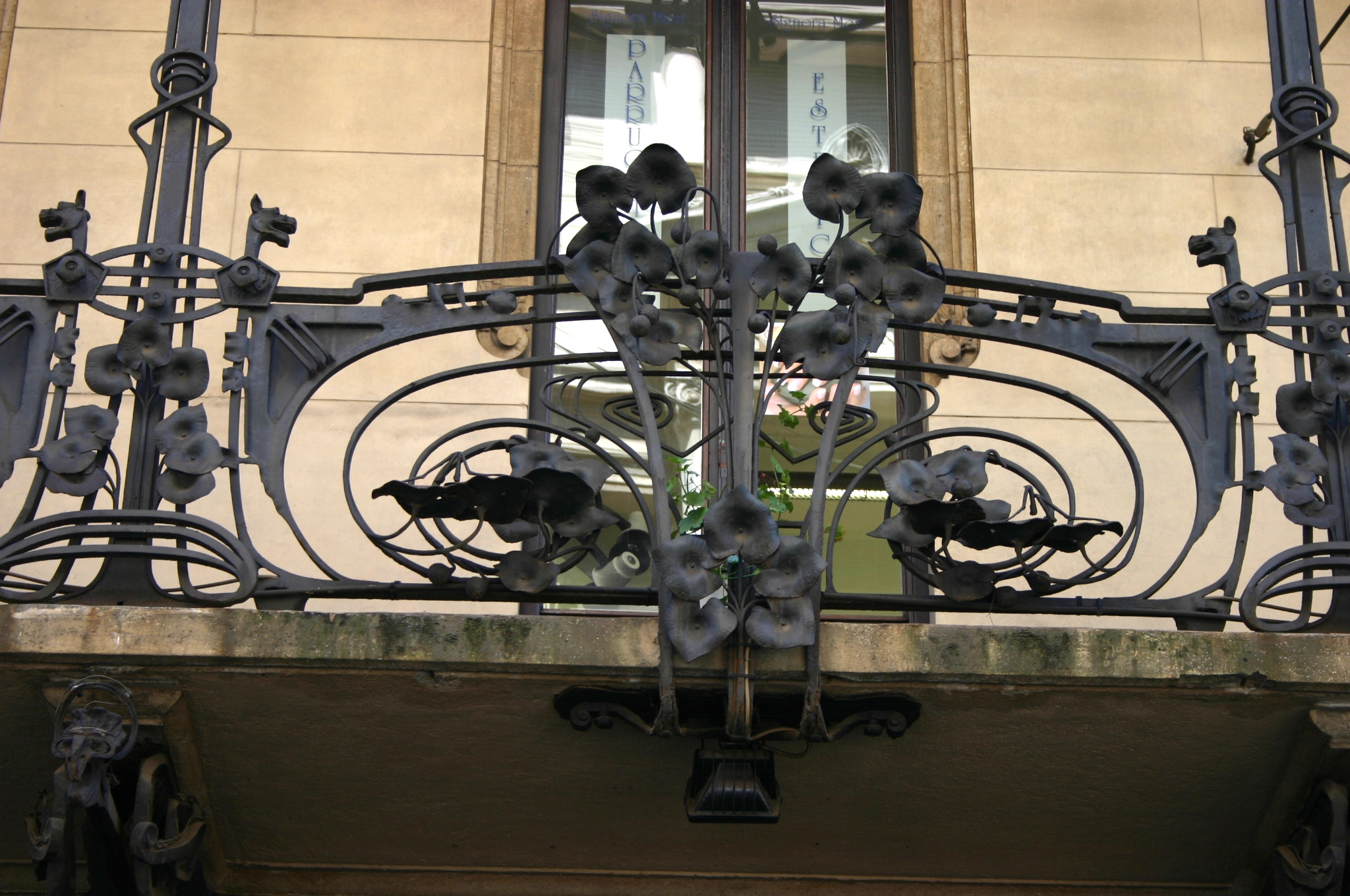
