= Achille Manfredini =

Italian architect

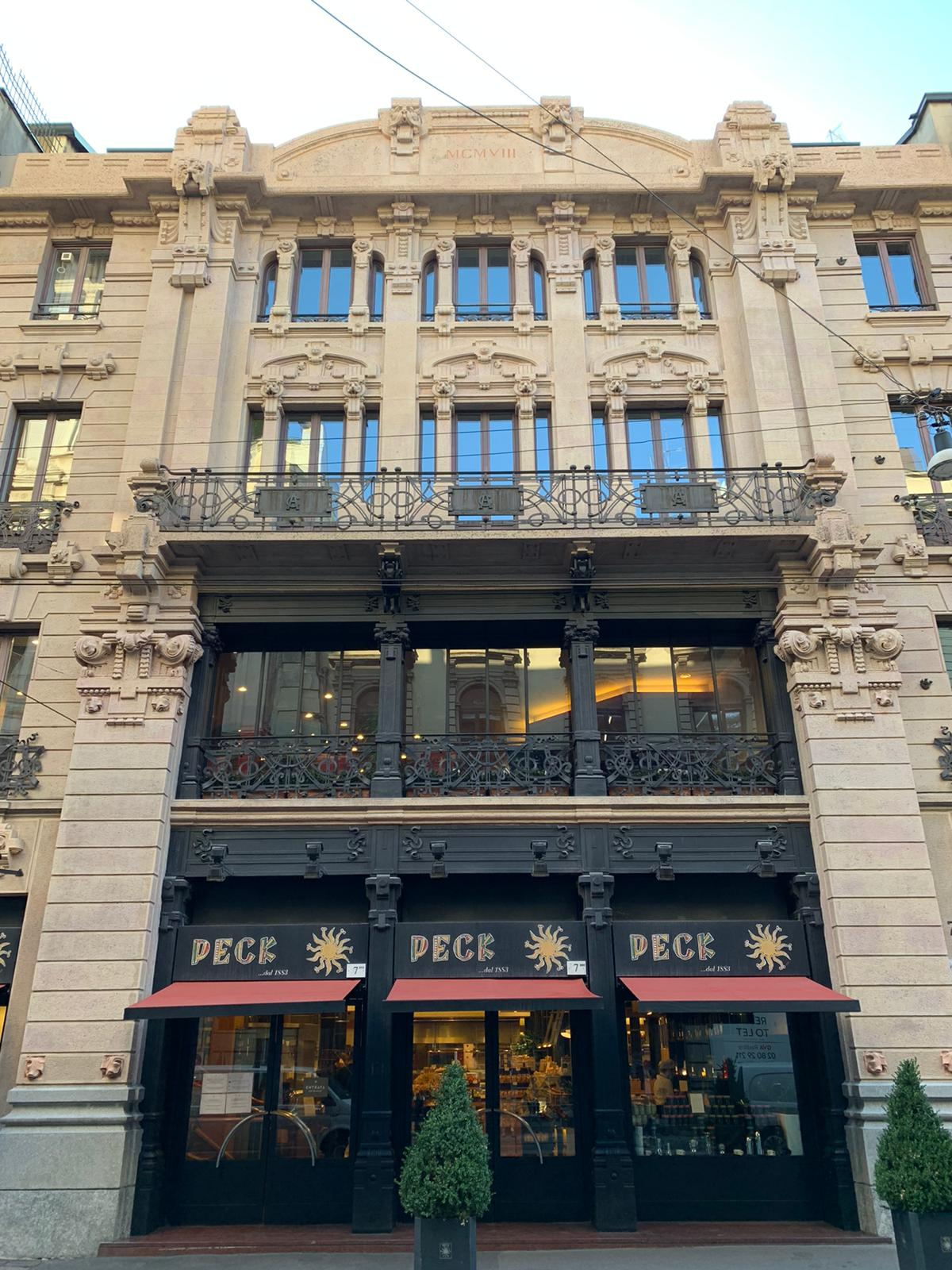
Casa Vanoni on Via Spadari

Achille Manfredini (13 May 1869 – 1920) was an Italian architect and engineer, active in the Liberty style or Art Nouveau movement.

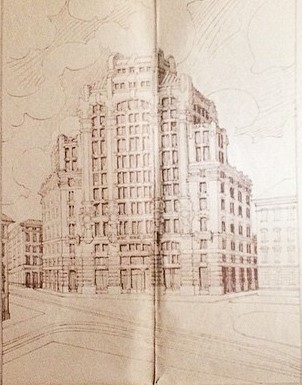
Grattanuvole, plan for commercial skyscraper

While born in Catanzaro, Calabria, his family hailed from Milan. He graduated from the Politechnic Institute of Milan. His monumental architecture exerted some influence on the futurist architect Antonio Sant'Elia.

Circa 1910, Manfredini developed a controversial project for a 14-storey skyscraper planned for the piazza where the former church of San Giovanni in Conca was located. The project was derided by critics as an Americanata. The opinions of skyscrapers in central Milan were divided among prominent architects of the time. The project was supported by Luigi Broggi and opposed by Luca Beltrami.

He became founder and editor of the trade journal for architecture and engineering Monitore tecnico, which began publication in 1894.

== Works in Milan ==
- Casa Lancia (1905) was demolished in 1939, to allow for the construction of the Palazzo del Banco di Roma
- Casa Vanoni (1907)
- Kursaal Diana (1907)
- Casa Giovini (1909)

== Bibliography ==
- Giorgio Rumi, Enrico Decleva: Milano nell'Italia liberale, 1898-1922, Cariplo 1993 (cassa di Risparmio delle provincie lombarde S.p.A.).
