= Vannoni =

Vannoni is an Italian surname, derived from the given name Giovanni via the hypocorism Vanni. Notable people with the surname include:

- Davide Vannoni (1967–2019), Italian academic, pseudoscientist and convicted criminal
- Yolande Vannoni (1923–2016), French table tennis player

== See also ==
- Vanoni
