= Ewerton =

Ewerton may refer to:

== People known by the mononym ==
- Ewerton (footballer, born 1989), Ewerton José Almeida Santos, Brazilian football centre-back
- Ewerton (footballer, born 1992), Ewerton da Silva Pereira, Brazilian football midfielder
- Ewerton (footballer, born 1996), Ewerton Paixao da Silva, Brazilian football winger
- Ewerton (footballer, born 1998), Ewerton Ferreira da Silva, Brazilian football goalkeeper

== People with the given name ==
- Ewerton Teixeira (born 1982), Brazilian kickboxer
- Ewerton Páscoa (born 1989), Brazilian football defender

== See also ==
- Everton (disambiguation)
- Ewerthon (born 1981), Ewerthon Henrique de Souza, Brazilian football forward
