= Museum of Australian Photography =

Art museum in Melbourne, Australia

Coordinates: 37.9077°S 145.1902°E

The Museum of Australian Photography (MAPh), formerly Waverley City Gallery and Monash Gallery of Art (MGA), is an art museum and gallery in Wheelers Hill, a suburb of Melbourne, Australia.

== History ==
The museum began as the Waverley City Gallery in the late 1970s, housed in a residential home in Mount Waverley. Run by the City of Waverley, the collection had a broad focus, displaying both Australian and International art, including paintings, photographs, prints, and textiles.

In 1990 a new gallery building, designed by Harry Seidler, was opened on the current site on Jells Road, Wheelers Hill. When the councils of the City of Oakleigh and the City of Waverley were amalgamated to form the City of Monash in 1994, the gallery was renamed the Monash Gallery of Art (MGA).

It was renamed Museum of Australian Photography (MAPh) in March 2023 to better reflect the organisation's extensive photography collection, and increase community reach and engagement. and the first show held under the new designation was Anne Zahalka's life-size replica of her Newtown studio

Anouska Phizacklea has been the director since 2018 supported by curators Angela Connor and Stella Loftus-Hills. Bemoaning the loss of dedicated photography curators in such institutions as the Art Gallery of New South Wales and the Powerhouse Museum, Cherine Fahd regards MAPh's rebranding as "statement of faith in photography's distinctiveness and also a way for the museum to carve out an identity amid the country's smaller regional and remote institutions."

== Description ==
The Museum of Australian Photography adjoins the Wheelers Hill Library on Jells Road, Wheelers Hill, Melbourne. The gallery and museum is dedicated to the collection, conservation, and exhibition of Australian photography.

== Collection ==
MAPh houses over 4,500 Australian photographs in their collection, many of which are available to access online via their website. The photographs reflect the history and development of Australian photographic practice from the 19th century to today. The collection is diverse and includes many iconic images and the work of photographers recognised as nationally significant. Exhibitions drawn from the collection are toured nationally.

== Exhibitions ==
Since 2006 the Museum, and in its previous entity as Monash Gallery of Art, has judged and exhibited every September the annual national Bowness Photography Prize, a $30,000 acquisitive award.

=== Selected exhibitions ===
- 2026, 12 September – 8 November: 2026 William and Winifred Bowness Photography Prize
- 2025–2026, 22 November–22 February: Young | youth in Australian photography: 1980s to now
- 2025, 1 March–30 May: The basement: photography from Prahran College (1968–1981)
- 2024–2025, 22 November–16 February: Ponch Hawkes 500 Strong
- 2024–2025, 23 November–16 Februrary: Petrina Hicks Snakes and mirrors
- 2024, 8 June–25 August: Built Photography
- 2024, 1 March–26 May: Janet Laurence Tears of Dust, an official exhibition of PHOTO 2024: International Festival of Photography
- 2023, December–18 February: Murray Fredericks The Salt Lake
- 2023, 10 June–10 September: Anne Zahalka: Zahalkaworld: an artist's archive

==== As Monash Gallery of Art ====
- 2022–2023, June–March: Untold Stories: uncovering LGBTIQA+ stories of the COVID-19 pandemic; collaboration between Monash Public Library Service and the Museum of Australian Photography presenting artists' and participants' record of the pandemic from the perspective of the LGBTIQA+ community, with the assistance of the Monash Council and a Libraries for Health and Wellbeing Grant provided by State Library Victoria and Public Libraries Victoria
- 2022, 29 April to 22 May: Speak the Wind, an exhibition of photographs by Hoda Afshar, an official exhibition of PHOTO 2022: International Festival of Photography.
- 2019–2020, 23 November–1 February: Albert Tucker: portraits
