= Christian Thompson (artist) =

Indigenous Australian artist (born 1978)

Christian Thompson AO
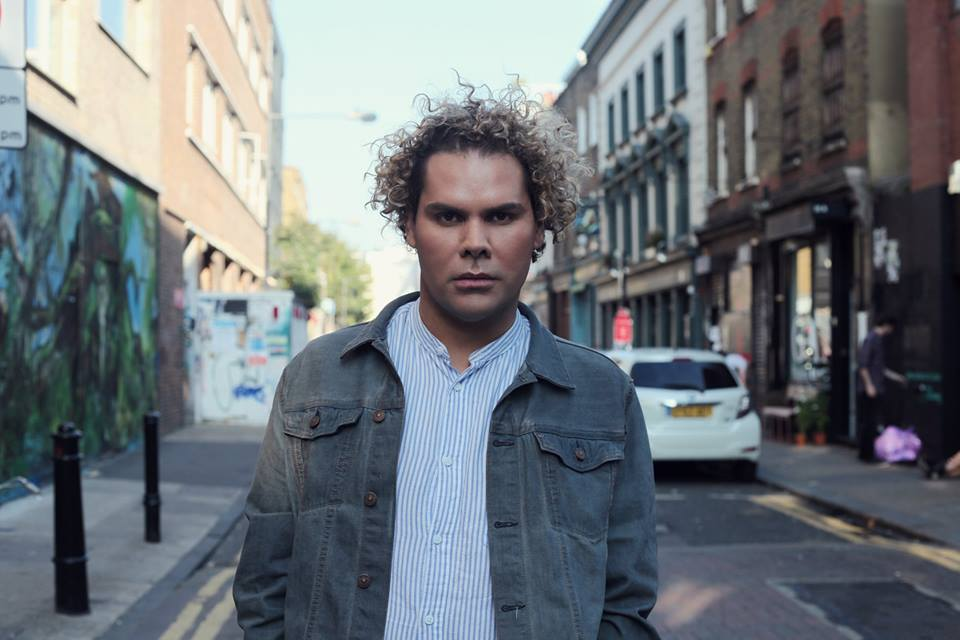
- Born: Christian Andrew William Thompson; 1978 (age 47–48); Gawler, South Australia
- Education: University of Southern Queensland, Royal Melbourne Institute of Technology, University of Oxford
- Website: Official website

Christian Andrew William Thompson AO (born 1978), also known as Christian Bumbarra Thompson, is a contemporary Australian artist. Of Bidjara heritage on his father's side, his Aboriginal identity has played an important role in his work, which includes photography, video installations and sound recordings. After being awarded the Charlie Perkins Scholarship, to complete his doctorate in Fine Arts at Oxford University, he has spent much time in England. His work has been extensively exhibited in galleries around Australia and internationally.

== Early life, influences and education ==
Thompson was born in Gawler, South Australia, north of Adelaide, and trained as an artist in Toowoomba, Queensland. He is of Bidjara (Aboriginal Australian people of central southwestern Queensland) and Chinese Australian heritage on his father's side, Kunja (Gunya) language group. He also has Irish, Norwegian and Sephardic Jewish ancestry. Thompson's great-great-grandfather is King Billy of Bonny Doon Lorne, a senior tribesman of the Bidjara people who reigned for many years over the district.

Thompson had an itinerant childhood, following his father's career in the RAAF, and lived in Darwin, Wagga Wagga, Raymond Terrace, Toowoomba, and Adelaide, along with his three brothers. He spent his formative years and family holidays in Barcaldine and in the bush learning the culture and traditions of his father's people from his grandmother and great aunts. Many of his family members were creative artists, so he "grew up surrounded by creative people". His grandmother gave Thompson his first camera, a Kodak Flashcube, at ten years old. He was greatly encouraged by his art teacher.

He undertook his Bachelor of Fine Arts degree in Toowoomba at the University of Southern Queensland, and in 1999 he relocated to Melbourne to undertake his Honours in Fine Art at the Royal Melbourne Institute of Technology.

While studying at Toowoomba and Melbourne, Thompson was heavily inspired by Fluxus artists George Maciunas and Yoko Ono, as well Andy Warhol and many others. He grew up immersed in music and culture of the 1980s and '90s and identified strongly with punk music.

He was an active member of the Melbourne art community, exhibiting his own work and curating group exhibitions. He undertook a curatorial internship at the Australian Centre for the Moving Image, and was on the curatorial group for shows Contemporary Commonwealth at the National Gallery of Victoria and the Australian Centre for the Moving Image. He established the MHUL Workshop, an annual workshop for young Indigenous artists from across Australia.

In 2009 he completed a Masters of Theatre degree at the DasArts, part of the Amsterdam School of the Arts. In 2010 he transferred to the Ruskin School of Art at the University of Oxford, after being awarded the Charlie Perkins Scholarship, to complete his doctorate (Doctorate of Philosophy (Fine Art). He was one of the first two Indigenous Australians to attend Oxford.

He moved to London some time after his time at Oxford. He said in 2014 that "a third of my life experiences and memories [were] attached to Europe", after his time in the Netherlands and England, and he had a worldview, which influenced his work. As his mother's family was from Bampton, Oxfordshire, he also grew up surrounded by British television shows, and he looked to England rather than the United States, as many young people of his age did.

== Career ==
Thompson meditated on the relationship between form and performance, and his early works focused on the relationship to the human form. He later moved into photography and video as a means to capture the performative qualities of his textile-based sculptures and elaborate costumes.

Thompson established himself in 2002 in the Australian art world with his first series, Blaks Palace, a series of photographs and giant oversized sweaters. Thompson's most notable works include his series Emotional Striptease, The Gates of Tambo and more recently his series Australian Graffiti, which are held in the collections of the National Gallery of Australia and the Art Gallery of New South Wales and AAMU in Utrecht, the Netherlands. His work deals with the nature of identity as an ever-evolving and uncharted terrain, bringing together a variety of seemingly disparate forms and themes. He undertook his first major public art project through the Future Arts Research program at the Arizona State University, Dartmouth College, and Massey University International Art Residency, Wellington, New Zealand.

His series of photographs Lost Together was made in the Netherlands where Thompson undertook a residency program at DasArts developing his live performance work which brought together his Bidjara and European heritage, combining classical music, traditional rhythms and lyrical narratives into richly textured, lilting and evocative arrangements. His sound based work is concerned with the innate lyricism of his traditional language and the expression of this in contemporary traditional and experimental musical forms. His work has appeared in various national and international publications including Frieze, Art and Australia, Art Monthly, Realtime, Art Review, Vogue magazine and in Susan Bright's book Auto Focus published by Thames & Hudson. Thompson was also shortlisted and highly commended for the Kate Challis RAKA Award and in 2011 for the Blake Prize and the Basil Sellers Art Prize.

== Exhibitions and gallery holdings ==
He has presented his photographs, videos and performance work in numerous solo and group exhibitions nationally and internationally. He was the first Aboriginal studio artist at Gertrude Street Contemporary Art Spaces 2006–2007, Melbourne. In 2008 he began international residencies at DasArts Advanced Studies for Performing Arts, Amsterdam, and Arizona State University in the United States. His work is held in many public and private collections in Australia and overseas, including the National Gallery of Australia, National Gallery of Victoria, Art Gallery of New South Wales, Queensland Art Gallery, the Kluge-Ruhe Aboriginal Art Collection of the University of Virginia, the Peter Klein Collection (Eberdingen, Germany), Latrobe Regional Gallery (Morwell, Australia), Aboriginal Art Museum (Utrecht, the Netherlands), Myer Collection (Melbourne, Australia), City of Melbourne Collection, the Pat Corrigan Collection, Artbank, Cate Blanchett and Andrew Upton collection and private collections.

His work was included in the 17th International Biennale of Sydney The Beauty of Distance - Songs of Survival in a Precarious Age, curated by David Elliot, and the 2018 Adelaide Biennial of Australian Art Before and After Science. curated by Sarah Tutton and Charlotte Day.

His 2010 series King Billy is held by the Perth Institute of Contemporary Arts. The work a tribute to his great-great-grandfather, King Billy of Bonnie Doon Lorne.

In 2011 Thompson undertook international residencies at the Australia Council for the Arts Greene street Studio in New York and the Fonderie Darling Studio in Montreal. His work Gamu Mambu from the Sydney Biennale was included in a major exhibition of Korean and Australian art at the Museum of Contemporary Art Australia.

Thompson's video work HEAT 2010 was included in the National Gallery of Australia's 2nd National Indigenous Art Triennial: unDISCLOSED in 2012.

His 2011 video work Dhagunyilangu, meaning brother, employs a British male opera singer to interpret the song written in Bidjara, one of many Aboriginal languages which have been lost during colonisation. It was included in the TarraWarra Biennial in Melbourne as well as the Pitt Rivers Museum at Oxford University in 2012, as part of the photographic series, We Bury Our Own. He said in 2015 that the impact of this series on other artists and academics had been the most rewarding thing for him in his career to date.

In 2014 he became the first recipient of the Massey University International Arts Residency in Wellington, New Zealand He collaborated with James Young, former collaborator of Nico, and recorded his own version of Dhagunyilangu and created a video work of himself singing in Bidjara. The video work titled Refuge is part of a larger series of works titled Eight Limbs shown at the Te Whare Hera Gallery, Wellington, in 2014.

In January 2015, Oxford's Trinity College took down the old paintings in its dining room for the first time in over 400 years to display an exhibition of Thompson's work.

The first survey of his work, an exhibition called Ritual Intimacy, presented in association with Monash University Museum of Art (MUMA) and curated by Hetti Perkins and Charlotte Day], was mounted at UNSW Art & Design Galleries in Paddington from May to July 2018. after being mounted at MUMA, Griffith University Art Museum in Brisbane and the Samstag Museum of Art in Adelaide.

From May 2018 he worked on his first virtual reality project, under the Australian Centre for the Moving Image Mordant Family VR Commission. It was mounted at ACMI in May 2019, titled Bayi Gardiya (Singing Desert). In the seven-minute installation, Thompson sings in the Bidjara language, which had been lost but is being revived. Thompson is the first recipient of the Mordant Family Commission VR, a three-year program worth A$240,000 to support artists who have never worked in VR before.

== Recognition ==
- 2010: Awarded the inaugural Charlie Perkins Scholarship to the University of Oxford to undertake his Doctorate of Philosophy (Fine Art), and was among the first cohort of Australian Aboriginal people to attend Oxford University in its 900-year history.
- 2010: Shortlisted for the Western Australian Indigenous Art Awards, run by the Art Gallery of Western Australia.
- 2012: Honourable mention, William and Winifred Bowness Photography Prize
- 2012: Finalist, The Anne Landa Award
- 2016: ACME Studio London Residency, Australian Council for the Arts
- 2017: Awarded the inaugural Mordant Family VR Commission at ACMI
- 2018: Made an Officer in the General Division of the Order of Australia in the 2018 Queen's Birthday Honours (Australia), for "outstanding service to the visual arts as a sculptor, photographer, video and performance artist, and as a role model for young Indigenous artists".
- 2019: Research affiliate, Pitt Rivers Museum, University of Oxford
- 2020: Bowness Photography Prize for "Rule of three".
