= Casa Vanoni =

Historic building in Milan, Italy

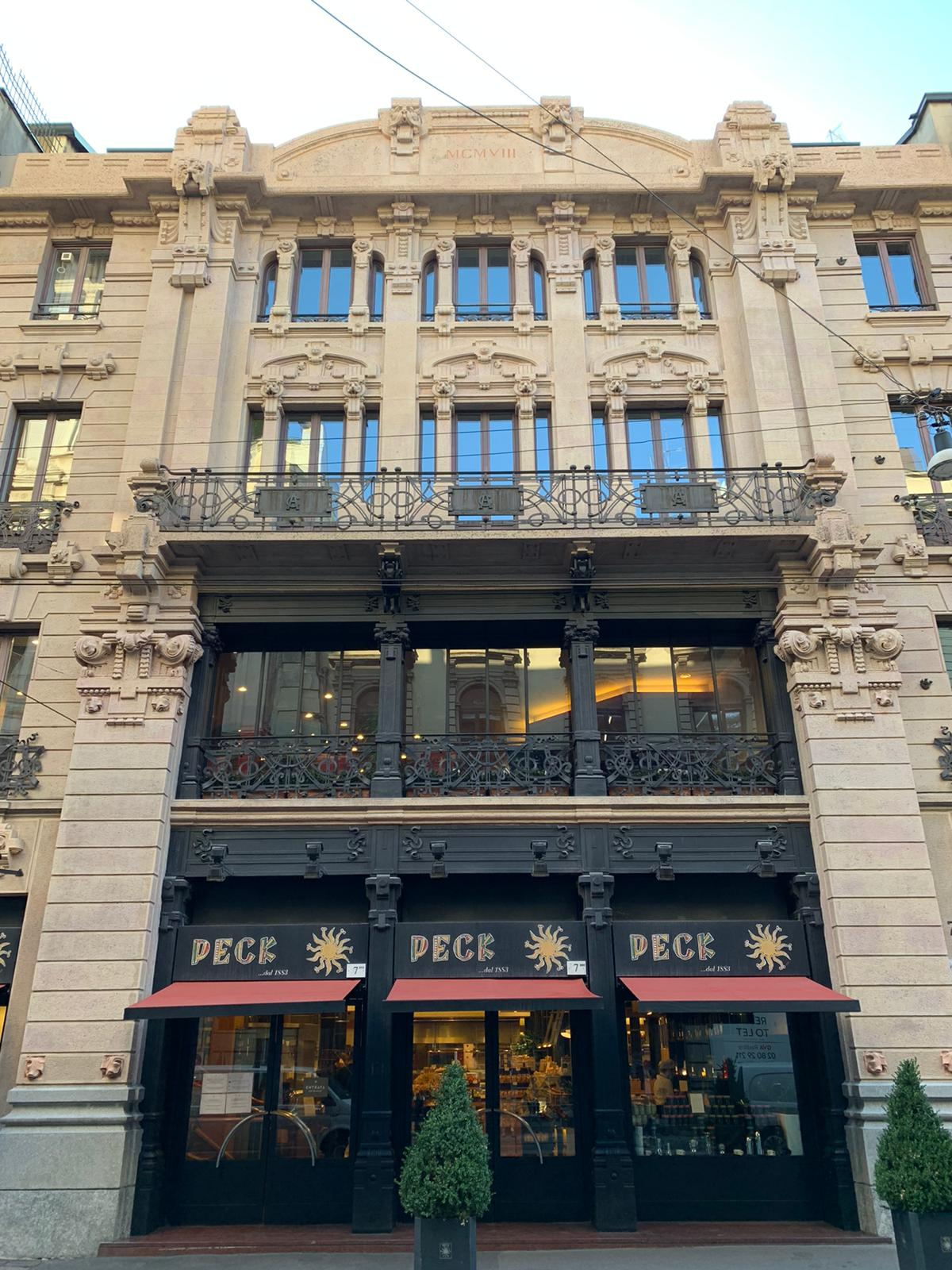
- Facade

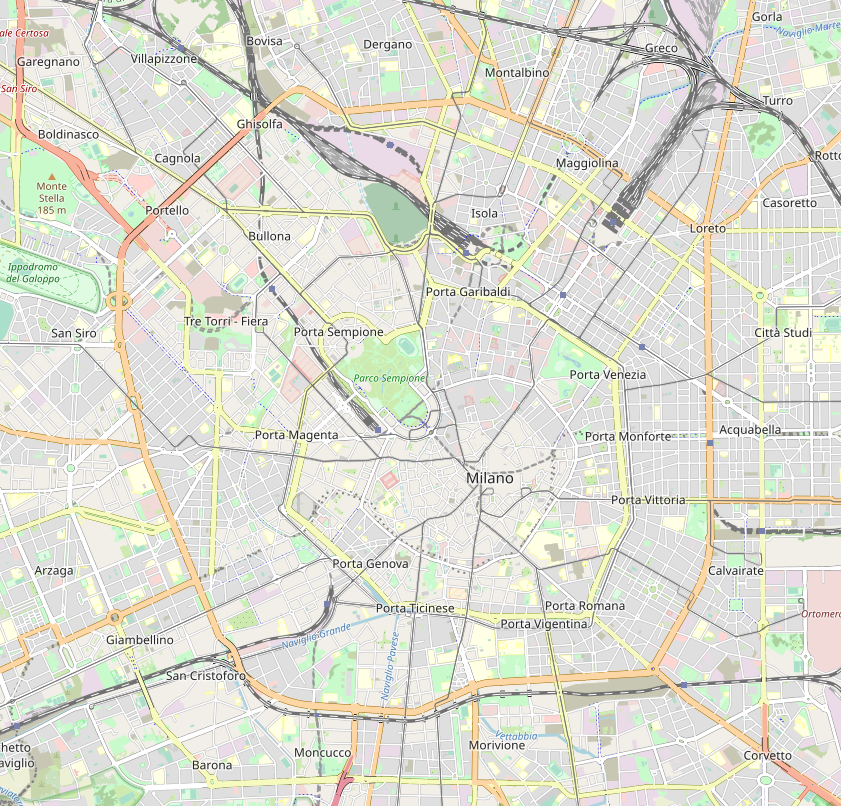
- Location within Milan Location within Italy

General information
- Architectural style: Liberty style or Art Nouveau
- Location: via Spadari #7, Milan, Italy
- Coordinates: 45.463323°N 9.187203°E
- Construction started: 1907
- Completed: 1908

Design and construction
- Architect: Achille Manfredini

Casa Vanoni is a historic Art Nouveau building located on via Spadari #7 in Milan, Italy.

== History ==
It was designed by Achille Manfredini in the Liberty style and built between 1907 and 1908.

== Description ==
The facade sports fanciful lintels, often dissociated from function. Along the roofline are leonine masks. The building is also notable for the wrought iron balustrades with complex swirling motifs. The four story apartment complex rises alongside the also Liberty-style Casa Ferrario and Casa Giovini, and facing the Casa dell'Unione Cooperativa.

A number of Casa Vanoni were constructed in Milan, the building on via A. Saffi 4, no longer has traces of the Alfredo Menni's 1903 design, but a distinct Casa Vanoni-Tarolli (1902), also designed by Menni decorated with a frescoed facade in Liberty style, is found on Via Francesco Petrarca #16.

== Gallery ==
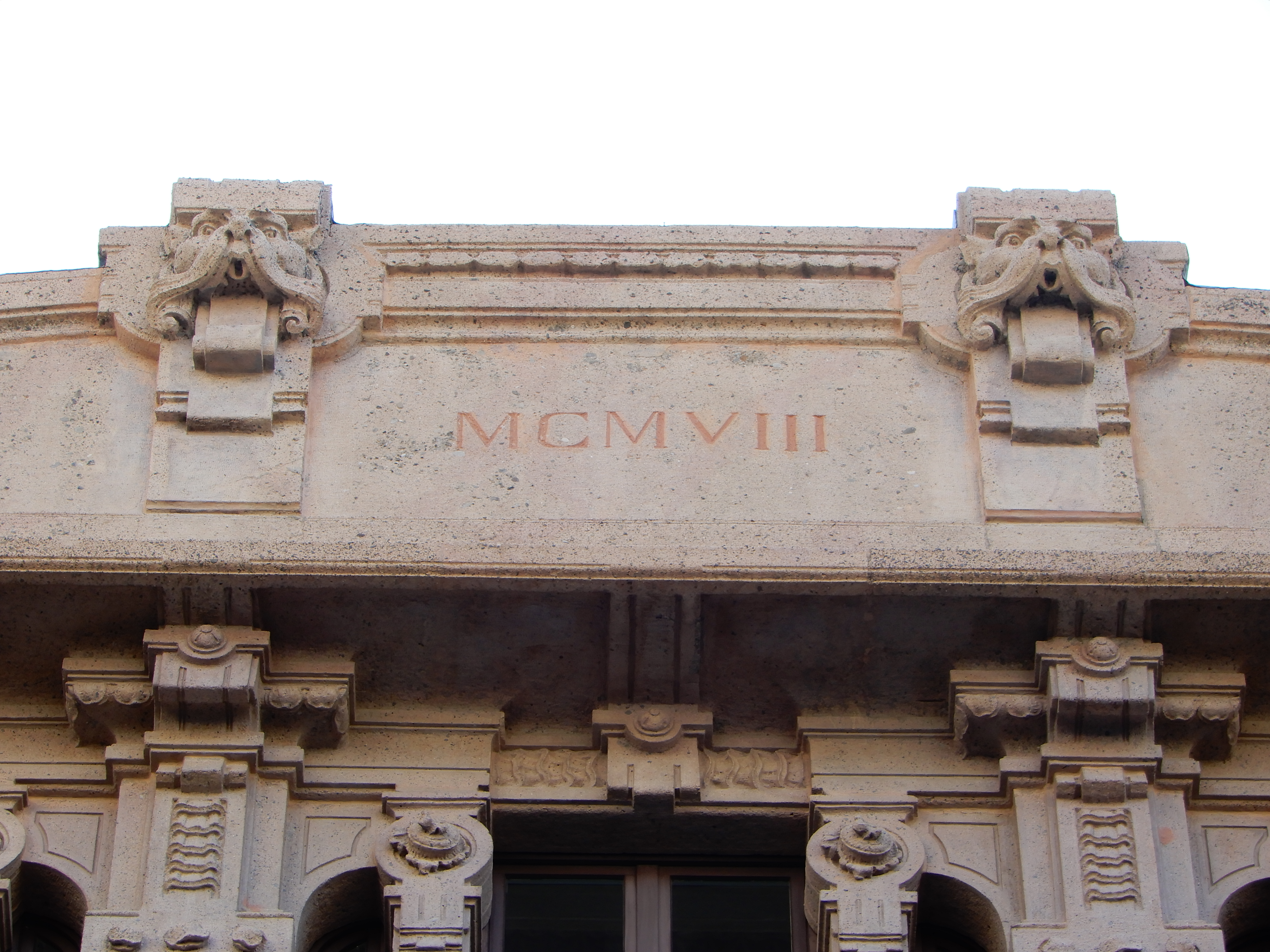

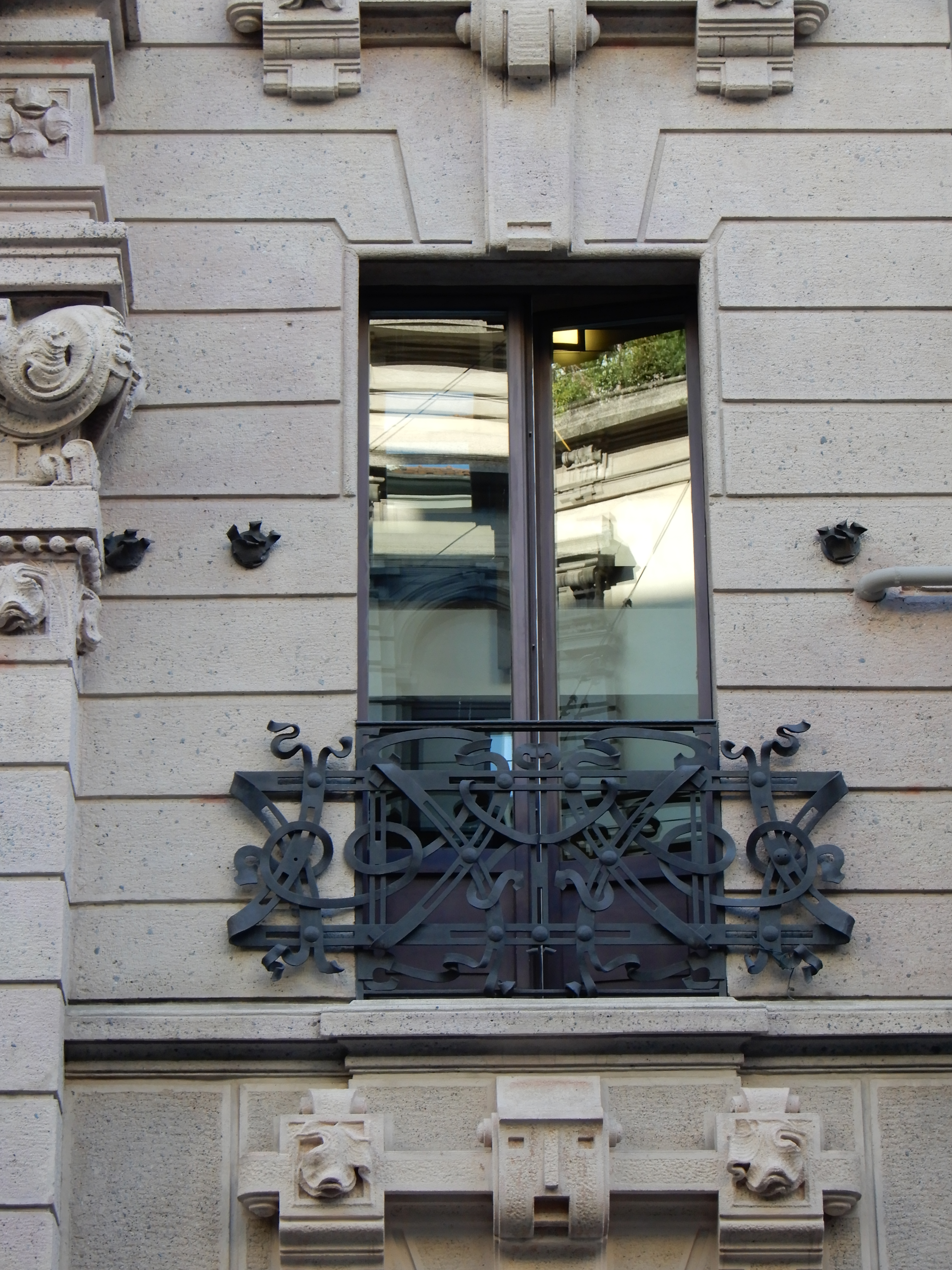

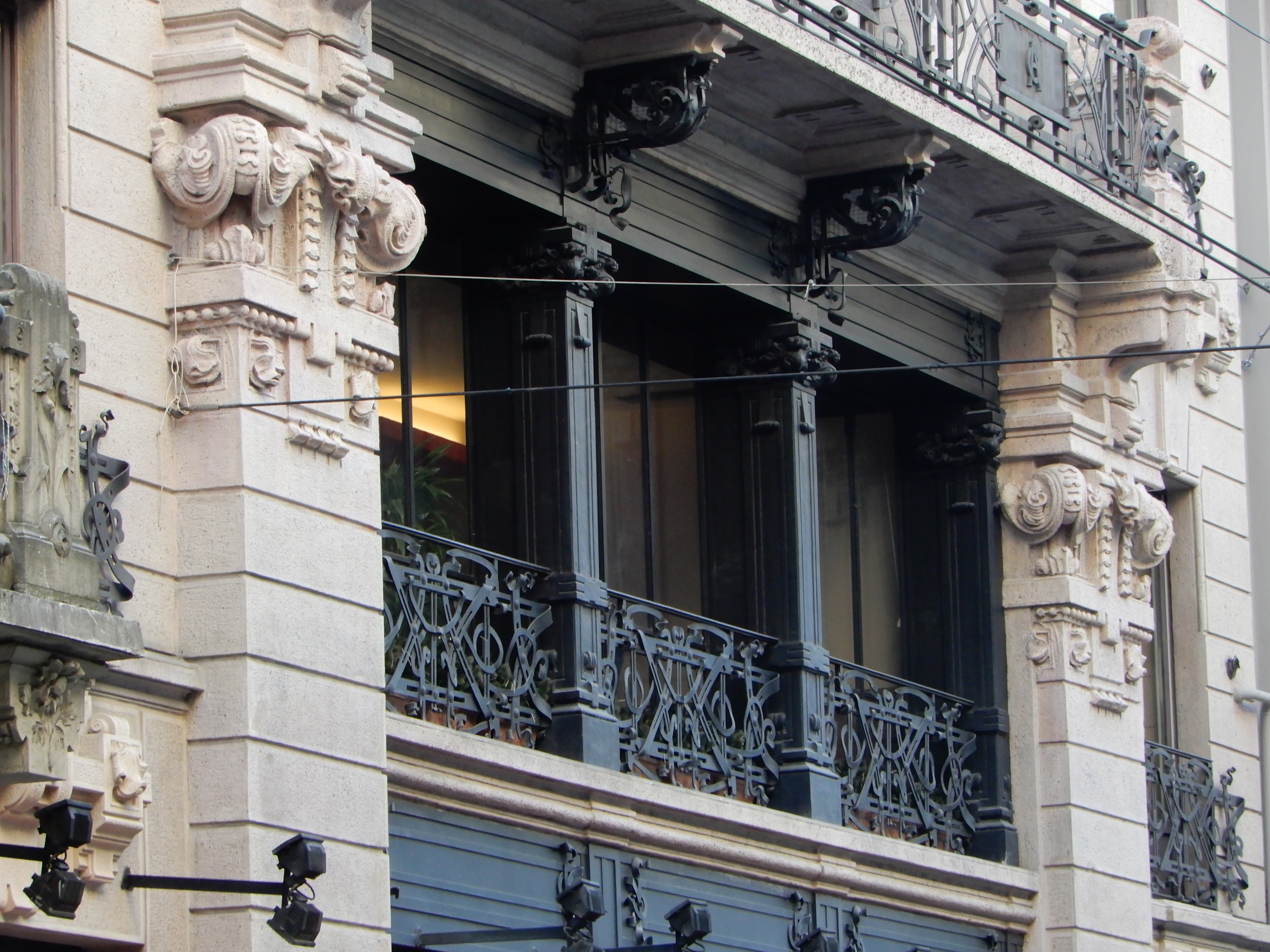
