= Anne Zahalka =

Australian photographer

- Born: 1957 (age 68–69); Sydney, Australia
- Known for: photography
- Website: zahalkaworld.com.au

Anne Zahalka (born 1957) is an Australian artist and photographer. Her work is held in the collections of the Art Gallery of New South Wales, National Gallery of Victoria, State Library of New South Wales and the National Gallery of Australia. In 2005, she was the recipient of the Leopold Godowsky Award at the Photographic Resource Centre in Boston.

== Early life and education ==
Zahalka was born to a Jewish Austrian mother and Catholic Czech father. Her parents met and married in England during the Second World War. Zahalka subsequently developed an interest in Australia's migrants and diverse cultures.

She studied at Sydney College of the Arts (undergraduate and postgraduate), 1979.

== Career ==
Zahalka's artwork revolves around Australian culture, focusing on themes such as gender roles, leisure activities and the conventions of art. She has spoken in interviews of her family and how her upbringing has influenced her work. She reflects on the lack of migrants' written documents, images and texts about Australia. Her best known image is The Sunbather #2. Another major art commission, Welcome to Sydney, was completed in 2003 for Sydney Airport.

Her residency in 1986–87 at the Künstlerhaus Bethanien, Berlin, gave her an opportunity reconnect with her European origins. Emulating complex interior scenes based on Dutch and Flemish masters like Vermeer, it led to sets of work collectively title Resemblance (1987) and Resemblance II (1989).

== Exhibitions ==
- Haimish, The Jewish Museum, Melbourne, 1998
- Leisureland, Roslyn Oxley9 Gallery, Sydney, 2000
- Fortresses and Frontiers, Robert Sandelson Gallery, London, 2000
- Hall of Mirrors: Anne Zahalka Portraits 1987–2007, National Portrait Gallery, 2007/08. A mid-career retrospective.
- Wild Life, ARC ONE Gallery, Melbourne, 2008
- A Time and a Place, group exhibition, Griffith University Arts Gallery, South East Queensland, 2015
- Wild Life, Australia, ARC ONE Gallery, Melbourne, 2019
- Zahalkaworld, Museum of Australian Photography, Melbourne, 2023

== Awards ==
- 2005: Leopold Godowsky Award, Photographic Resource Centre, Boston.
- 2023: Bowness Photography Prize with "Kunstkammer".

== Collections ==
Zahalka's work is held in the following permanent collections:

- Art Gallery of New South Wales, Sydney
- Monash Gallery of Art, Monash, Melbourne, Victoria
- National Gallery of Victoria.
- National Gallery of Australia, Canberra, ACT : Die Putzfrau (The Cleaner) 1987
