= Everton Mlalazi =

- Born: Ntutuko Everton Mlalazi; May 22, 1982 (age 44); Harare, Zimbabwe
- Origin: Bulawayo
- Genres: Gospel music; Contemporary gospel
- Occupations: Singer, songwriter
- Years active: 2014–present
- Website: https://evertonmlalazimusic.com/

Everton Mlalazi is a Zimbabwean gospel artist and philanthropist. He is a member of Spirit of Praise, a prominent regional gospel group. Mlalazi is also founder of The Vine and Worship Therapy choirs.

== Background ==
Everton Mlalazi was born in 1982 in Harare, Zimbabwe. He had his early childhood in Nyamandhlovu, Bulawayo and later went back with his parents to Harare in Glennorah suburb where he had his primary education.

Mlalazi started professional music career in 2014 when he put together a musical ensemble called The Vine Music Ministry as the founder and director. Mlalazi rose to prominence when he then started his solo career in the year 2020 in which he released his debut album, In The Presence 1 in November 2021 following the success of the singles Uyingcwele and Ekhaya. Ever since then, he had significant radio success having several songs in charts. Uyingcwele was on number one for five weeks on Star FM Gospel Greats and number three on overall top 50 gospel songs of the year 2020. Uyingcwele and Ekhaya made it into the Skys Metro FM annual top 50 with Uyingcwele in the top 10 at number eight. Ekhaya made it onto the Classic 263 Annual Top 50.

His other songs that include Bambelela, My Father’s House, Mwari Hamushanduki, Pfugama Unamate and No Night There did very well on gospel charts at main radio stations (Star FM Zimbabwe, Skys Metro FM, ZiFM Stereo, Radio Zimbabwe and Power FM Zimbabwe) in 2021. My Father’s House was number three on the ZiFM Annual Top 50. No Night There and Mwari Hamushanduki also made it into the Top 50. Pfugama Unamate was on Radio Zimbabwe top 50 chart for 2021 as well as number one on Star FM Annual Top 50 and No Night There was number one on the Power FM Annual Top 50.

Everton founded Celestial Chorus, an annual Thanksgiving dinner that for leading gospel artists in an evening of worship and hymn reinterpretation. In 2024, Everton joined the world renowned Spirit of Praise ensemble, recording two songs, including hit song Ndofamba naJesu.

Everton Mlalazi is married to Gamuchirai Mlalazi and has two daughters.

== Discography ==
=== Albums ===
- In The Presence 1 (2021)
- In The Presence 2 (2023)
- Celestial Chorus, Vol. 1 (2024)
- Celestial Chorus, Vol. 2 (2025)
- Celestial Chorus, Vol. 3 (2026)
- In The Presence 3
- Virtual Hymns Volume 1

=== Singles ===
- Jesus is the answer
- Uyingcwele
- Ekhaya
- My Fathers House feat. Xolly Mncwango
- Pfugama Unamate feat. Michael Mahendere
- No Night There
- Jesus Paid it all
- Mwari Hamushanduki feat. Benjamin Dube
- Angeke Kulunge

== Awards and recognition ==
- Best Live Production (The Vine) - PERMICAN Awards 2019
- Best Gospel Song of the year nomination (Uyingcwele) - Star FM Music Awards 2020
- Best Newcomer - Star FM Music Awards 2021
- Best Gospel song of the year nomination (Uyingwele) - Star FM Music Awards 2021
- Best Gospel song of the year nomination (Pfugama Unamate) - Star FM Listeners Choice Awards 2022
- Best Producer nomination - Zimbabwe Music Awards
- Best Contemporary Gospel Artist - Zimbabwe Music Awards 2022
- Outstanding Gospel Act - Bulawayo Arts Awards 2022 and 2023
- Africa Gospel Artist of the year - CLIMA Africa Awards 2023
- Best of Africa Gospel - South Africa Crown Gospel Awards
- Africa Gospel Male Artist of the year - CLIMA Africa Awards 2025
- Africa Viewers Choice award
- CLIMA Africa Awards 2025 - Best Live Recording – (Great Is Thy Faithfulness album)
- CLIMA Africa Awards 2025 - Music Impact in Africa.
- CLIMA Africa Awards 2025 - Best Collaboration – for his song with Vashawn Mitchell
- Bulawayo Arts Awards - Outstanding World Wide Ambassador
- Global University of Science and Technology - Honorary Doctorate Of Music
