= Vintage Photo Festival =

Polish photography festival

The Vintage Photo Festival – International Festival of Analog Photography Enthusiasts
- Frequency: Annual
- Locations: Bydgoszcz, Poland
- Inaugurated: 2015
- Website: https://www.vintagephotofestival.com/vintage-photo-festival-en

The Vintage Photo Festival – International Festival of Analog Photography Enthusiasts is an annual cultural even organized in Bydgoszcz by the Fotografistka Foundation. It was created in 2015 out of passion for analog photography and the belief that old techniques in photography were experiencing a renaissance. Despite great revolution and evolution in digital photography, the return or even the rebirth of so-called traditional photography is visible. Film cameras are back in use, which can be proven by photographic film manufacturers such as Kodak who in recent years has got back to manufacturing several types of negative film which were taken off the market in the past. As a result, younger and younger creators are using analog photography as their medium of expression.

The idea of the festival is based on rich photographic traditions in Bydgoszcz, where until the 1990s, Foton, the second biggest in Poland factory producing photographic materials, was located. On the basis of this cultural heritage, the initiator of the event, Katarzyna Gębarowska, created a pioneering event dedicated to traditional photography with a modern education and animation platform as its strong suit. The aim of the festival it to promote traditional photography and current trends in this field. Each edition of the festival abounds in several exhibitions, meetings with authors, workshops, film screenings, concerts and undercards.

The Vintage Grand Prix is an important element of the festival. Its aim is to select the most interesting projects sent annually from all around the world. The competition is open. The foundation invites professional photographers as well as art school students and graduates, amateurs and freelancers to submit their works. Photos submitted to the competition should be made using traditional techniques: film photography, instant camera, camera obscura, daguerreotype, collodion wet plate, calotype, cyanotype and so on. The jury is composed of the director of the festival Katarzyna Gębarowska, Adam Mazur, Maria Teresa Salvati and Paweł Żak.

The main partner of the event is the Kuyavian-Pomeranian Voivodeship. The festival is co-financed by the Ministry of Culture and National Heritage, the City Council of Bydgoszcz and the Marshal's Office in Toruń.

== History ==
=== Vintage Photo Festival 2015 ===
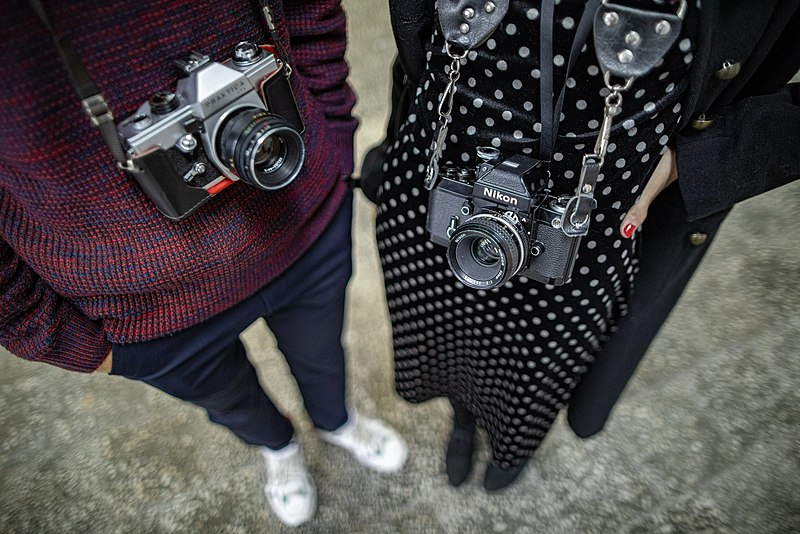
Vintage Photo Festival press materials

In the first edition of the festival the organizers focused on human corporeality. Anna Grzelewska held and exhibition entitled "Julia Wannabe" which presented childhood, its hardships and the period of becoming a young adult. Eugenia Maximova also decided to take a closer look at childhood in her exhibition entitled "Associated Nostalgia". Many of her childhood memories are related to kitsch, sometimes hard to digest, but for many also unpretentious and tasteful. The artist considers her work to be a kind of antidote to typical stories about the Bulgarian region in which she grew up. The theme of corporeality was also strongly highlighted in the exhibition Eva Rubinstein "Autoportret" ["Self-portrait"] by Katarzyna Gębarowska. The author claims that each photograph is as kind of a self-portrait and this is what her works present.

What is more, the exhibition "Miłosz.Tutejszy" ["Miłosz.Local"] by Wojciech Prażmowski could have been viewed during the festival. It presented places related to the life and works of Czesław Miłosz. The exhibition was an imaginative journey following the tracks of places in Poland in Lithuania, which were important for the Master and where the cultures transcendent.

In her series of photos called "Interior/Exterior", artist Marja Pirilä presented the camera obscura technique. In turn, Hanna Zamelska presented the collodion process.

First place in the Vintage Grand Prix competition went to Anita Andrzejewska. "Niespiesznie" ["Unhurriedly"] is a series of several dozen black and white photographs which were taken during several of the photographer's trips to Birma. In photography, she tries to reach deeper and more personally into the spirit of this place and create a universal story about people, landscape and objects. Second place was given to Marzena Kolarz "ALL". The award-winning photographs were made in the ambrotype technique. The classic black and white photo essay by Piotr Cieśla was given third place.

=== Vintage Photo Festival 2016 ===
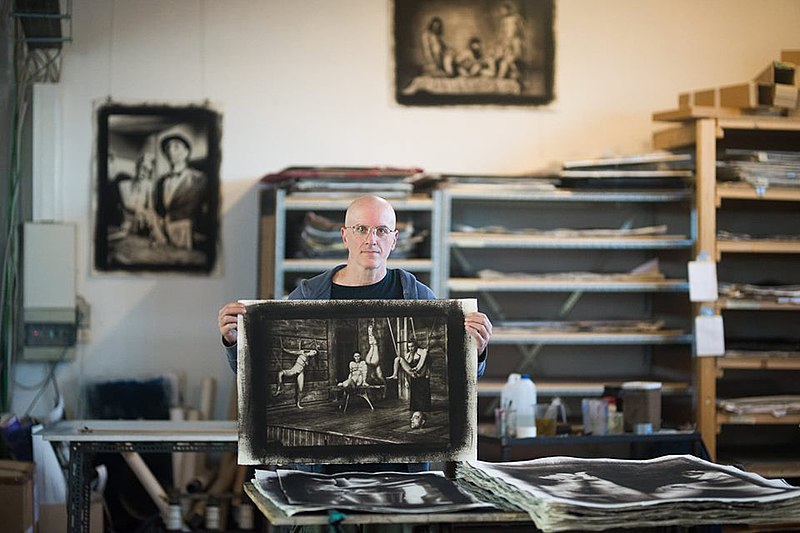
Laurent Benaïm "Sur Moi"

In the second edition of the festival the theme of returning to the roots and related melancholy was visible. The exhibitions included, among others, the works by Tadeusz Rolke. The exhibition titled "Baryty" presented photographs which constituted an overview of the artist's works from different years, from the late 1950s to the second half of the 1980s. The starting point for Amy Friend's exhibition entitled "Dare Alla Luce" were anonymous vintage photographs. By manipulating light, the artist gave a metaphorical meaning to these old photos. Archival photographs were also the starting point for the project by Aneta Grzeszykowska entitled "Negative Book". The artist took a series of photographs of her body using the analog technique. She painted them black to get negative photos – a light reversal self-portrait.

According to Emmanuel Levinas, the face can never be fully characterized, can never be fully represented. It is an infinite, undefined element which destroys the unity and the peace of our world. This is how the exhibition by Filip Ćwik entitled "12 twarzy" ["12 faces"] was introduced.

First place in the Vintage Grand Prix 2016 competition went to Izabela Poniatowska. Her project "Poczet" [Congregation] made in the camera-less photography technique is a contemporary interpretation of the traditional congregations of saints. Second place went to Marcela Paniak. Her series of archival family photographs entitled "Family Stories" asks the following question: "Is it possible to reconstruct your story based on watching family photos and speaking with family members?" Third place went to Malwina Adaszek and her instant camera photos entitles "Dreamland". The artist wanted to capture the lost atmosphere of her youngest years, when her interests revolved around feeling harmony with nature, longing for a simple life devoid of worries. Honorary awards were also given to Paweł Biedrzycki, Mindaugas Gabrenas and Agnieszka Piasecka.

=== Vintage Photo Festival 2017 ===
The theme of the third edition of the Vintage Photo Festival were color photography techniques of the past and today. In 1907 the Lumière brothers patented the autochrome technique, i.e. the first method of obtaining color photographs in the form of positive images on a glass plate. During the festival the collection of autochromes by Tadeusz Rząca, photographer and entrepreneur from Kraków, taken around 1910–1920 was presented.

In turn, Dutch artist Sanne de Wilde presented the project titled "The Island of the Colorblind" carried out in 2015 on two islands in the Micronesian state of Pohnpei inhabited by people who have inherited achromatopsia (total color blindness) for ages. By using various photographic techniques (including infra-red photography, manual coloring of photos), the artist tried to bring the viewer closer to the world of people who do not recognize colors.

Yet another approach to color was presented by Pszemek Dzienis who, in his project entitled "Pureview", recreated the definition of photography as light painting, which was promoted by one of its pioneers – Talbot. The most important element in his project was the color itself, colliding with the landscape. The color of the landscape, obtained with his own technique, was also the main theme of Teresa Gierzyńska's exhibition "Nastroje" [Moods], which was curated by Katarzyna Gębarowska. The artist presented unpublished color photographs taken in 1984.

First place in the Vintage Grand Prix 2017 competition went to Tomasz Kowalczyk and his project entitled "Deserted land". Second place was awarded to Tomasz Lewandowski and his series of black and white photos "Auschwitz – ultima ratio ery modernizmu" [Auschwitz – the ultima ratio of modernism]. Third place went to Agata Jarczyńska and her series of color film photographs called "Saudade". Honorable mentions were given to Katarzyna Michalska and Joanna Borowiec.

=== Vintage Photo Festival 2018 ===
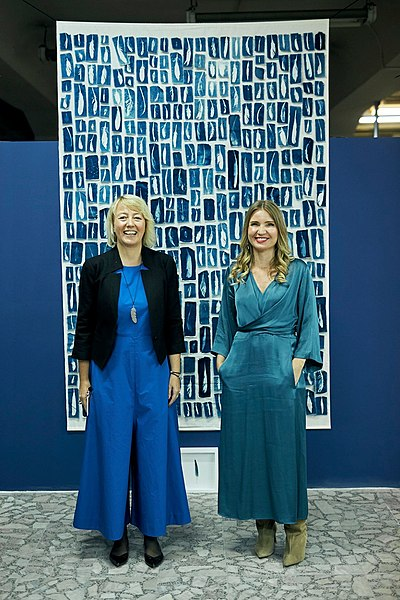
Katarzyna Kryńska and Katarzyna Gębarowska exhibition of Katarzyna Kryńska "Cichość serca" (Meekness of heart)

The theme of the fourth edition of the festival was "A woman behind and in front of the camera" with reference to the Women's Year established by the Sejm of the Republic of Poland in 2018. Referring to the theme, the Vintage Photo Festival was the first in the world to exhibit black and white negative photos of Masha Ivashintsova – hailed as Russian Vivian Maier, discovered in an attic in St. Petersburg. The curators of the exhibition were Katarzyna Gębarowska and Masha Galleries. Aruna Canevascini was also present during the festival with her project entitled "Villa Argentina". In this creative solitude à deux, the artist deals with the issues of domestication, femininity and migration.

The aim of Eric Schuett's project entitled "Wiejskie królowe" [ Village queens] was to depict portraits of elderly women in their traditional folk costumes, worn on a daily basis at home or on special occasions. The photographer created an ethnographic series of portraits that open the door to a previous era, while Shuwei Liu presented the spirit of the distant northern province in his photograph collection entitled "Childhood Revisited"

The exhibition entitled "Dawna, nowoczesna, pośmiertna" ["Old, modern, posthumous"] from the Madelski photograph collection, curated by Adam Mazur and Ariana Hekmat, was an opportunity to see classic darkroom prints made by masters of Polish photography.

The exhibition of old photographs of the Foton plant was accompanied by the release of the book entitled "Kobiety Fotonu" [The women of Foton] by Małgorzata Czyńska and Katarzyna Gębarowska. The reportage includes oral stories completed with photographs taken from the book author's private archives. The book describes the photochemical industry suitable for women. At the "Foton" Photochemical Plant in Bydgoszcz most of the crew were women. They built the post-war legend of Polish analog photography and contributed to the success of the largest manufacturers of paper for black and white and color photography. Female chemists, lab technicians and accountants added their chapter to the official history of Foton. They spoke passionately about their professional choices, the situation of women in the industry, as well as about loves and marriages made in the darkroom.

First prize in the Vintage Grand Prix 2018 competition went to Paulina Ząbek. "Próżnia" [Vacuum] is a series of photographs about Alzheimer's disease, made using the wet collodion technique. Second place went to Piotr Rosiński. His project "Entropia, inercja, pustka" ["Entropy, inertia, emptiness"] is a series of photographs presenting the author's aesthetic vision of the world made using the dyed cyanotype technique. Third place went to Arianna Ancona. The project "Czwarte Wybrzeże" ["Forth Coast"] shows the tragedy of thousands of Libyans deported in 1911, during the Italian-Turkish war, to the island of Tremiti. It contains scans of archival materials, printed and dyed green to commemorate and pay respect to Libyan traditions. Honorable mentions went to Łukasz Szamałka, Maciek Iwaniszewski. Marek Noniewicz won a special award for his outstanding achievements. He presented his project "This is not Still Life" – a series of photographs made in 2013–2016.

=== Vintage Photo Festival 2019 ===
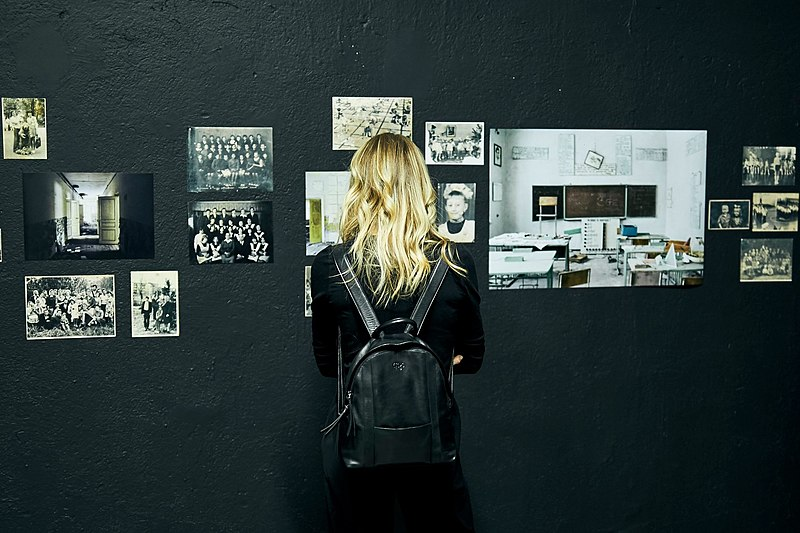
Exhibition of Maxim Dondyuk "Projekt bez nazwy z Czarnobyl" (Project without a name from Chernobyl)

The fifth edition of the Vintage Photo Festival included exhibitions of international and local artists revolving around the theme of the photography archive. This theme referred to the current trend for photo archives. As Marianna Otmianowska, contemporary director of the Polish National Digital Archives highlighted "The pursuit of the traces of the past is in progress". Hence, the emphasis of this edition on vernacular photographs, private archives and family albums.

Rie Yamada is a Japanese photographer who settled in Berlin. In her project "Familie Werden" she reconstructs family photographs in a funny and absurd way, personating each family member. Teresa Anniuk-Gulak found another way to interpret the family album by processing a series of photographs of her deceased mother in her own way. Family albums and vernacular photographs were also present in the exhibition entitled "Eros i Tanatos. Bydgoskie pionierki fotografii zawodowej 1888-1945" ["Eros and Thanatos. The female pioneers in professional photography in Bydgoszcz 1888-1945"], which was curated by Katarzyna Gębarowska. In turn, Marcela Paniak carried out workshops for everyone interested in archival family photography and such aspects as its history, memory and identity.

The photographs presented by Bogdan Konopkia are a part of his photographic archive (1953-2019). So are Tomasz Gudzowaty series of photos entitled "Proof", which consists of photographs originally considered to be by-products of the actual Polaroid Type 55.

The invited artists conducted numerous workshops and open-air photography events in the city space, which made it possible to show the landscape values of Bydgoszcz. An artist with the pseudonym Sepc who creates murals was invited to cooperate. This Columbian creator came up with an unusual street game based on photography by creating murals in negatives. The final image, i.e. a positive, is visible after recreating the colors in the mobile application. The mural presents Jadwiga Szopieraj, one of the pioneers of professional photography in Bydgoszcz. The grand opening of the mural took place as part of the festival's prologue.

First place in the Vintage Grand Prix 2019 competition went to Agnieszka Grymowicz. The project "Poza czas" ["Out of time"] consists of portraits close to the artist made using a technique called "luxography". Second place went to Karol Szymkowiak. His project "C'è semper un tango" depicts the memories of the artist's grandfather, inspired by the notes of tango found among the mementoes of Mr. Władysław. Third place in the competition was awarded to Igor Tereshkov. His project "Ropa i Mech" ["Oil and Moss"] presents the ecological catastrophe in Russia. The project consists of photographs taken on a 35 mm plate, which the artist developed with the addition of oil from the KhMAO spills to materialize the degradation of the natural environment in the region. Honorable mention in this edition was awarded to: Celeste Ortiz, Wojciech Sternak and Adam Juszkiewicz.

=== Vintage Photo Festival 2020 ===
The theme of the sixth edition of the Vintage Photo Festival was freedom. Originally, it took its roots from the 100th anniversary of Bydgoszcz's return to Poland in 2020. Then, the outbreak of the COVID-19 pandemic happened. For this reason, the exhibitions presented within the sixth edition of the festival raised the topic of freedom in various contexts, as liberation from slavery, personal freedom, as well as freedom related to isolation and physical closure caused by the pandemic.

One of the festival exhibitions was "Lajkarze". From the 1920s, a new type of photographer appeared on the streets of Bydgoszcz - a street photographer called "lejkarz" in Polish. As Małgorzata Czyńska writes in the festival program intro: "Instead of photos posed in an atelier, studied and static, there is naturalness, life itself. Photographers took to the streets of cities and captured the inhabitants on the move, on the run, in a hurry. The revolution took place thanks the 35 mm film from Leica." (Source: paper festival program intro) Thanks to them we know what Bydgoszcz and its inhabitants looked like on the day on which Poland regained independence.

The exhibition by Masha Svyatogor "Everybody dance!" gathered works focused on the artist's reflections on the USSR and the notion of "Soviet". The works were based on photographs found in many issues of the Sovetskoe Foto magazine, the visual material of the Soviet government which was used by them to build their "ceremonial" image. The artist creates photomontages by hand, deliberately giving up digital technologies, thus evoking the metaphor of the history fabric. Masha literally cuts the "fabric" - she officially disassembles images and uses them to create her own surreal, decorative depictions.

A different context of freedom could be seen in the works of Iranian photographer Parisa Aminolahi, which are a photographic record of life in two extremely different places both geographically and socially - Iran and the Netherlands. Freedom from restrictions, liberty characterizing life in exile, braided with a sense of responsibility for parents left in Iran

The theme of the pandemic and quarantine could be found in the "Quarantine collection" by Han Cao, which included hand-embroidered masks attached to old photographs from 1900 to 1940.

First prize in the Vintage Grand Prix 2020 competition went to Chilean photographer Marcelo Aragonese. The project "Threads and Light" combines analog photography with embroidery. Second place was granted to Katarzyna Kryńska. Third place went to Paz Olivares Droguett, who created a daily record of the transformation of her grandparents' house into her own on a color plate, asking about the meaning of intimate space during the quarantine. Honorable mentions in this edition were awarded to: Iwona Germanek, Ciro Battiloro, Camila Alvarez and Filippo Bardazzi
