= Everton =

Everton may refer to:

== People ==
- Everton (name), a list of people with the name

== Places ==
=== Australia ===
- Everton, Victoria
- Electoral district of Everton, Queensland

=== Canada ===
- Everton, Ontario

=== South Africa ===
- Everton, part of Kloof, KwaZulu-Natal

=== United Kingdom ===
- Everton, Bedfordshire, England
- Everton, Hampshire, England
- Everton, Liverpool, a district of Liverpool, England
  - Everton (ward), a Liverpool City Council Ward
- Everton, Nottinghamshire, England

=== United States ===
- Everton, Arkansas
- Everton, Indiana
- Everton, Missouri

== Sport ==
- Everton F.C., an English football club based in Liverpool, England
- Everton F.C. Women, an English women's football team playing in the FA Women's Super League
- Everton Tigers, previous name of the Mersey Tigers, a defunct basketball franchise once owned by the football club
- Everton de Viña del Mar, a Chilean football team named after the original British football team
- Everton F.C. (Trinidad and Tobago), a former Trinidad and Tobago football team

== See also ==
- Ewerton (disambiguation)
- Ewerthon (born 1981), Brazilian footballer
