= Samantha Everton =

Australian photographer

Samantha Everton is an Australian photographic artist who creates images with dreamlike and theatrical qualities, living in Melbourne.

== Early life ==
Everton was raised in Emerald, a small town in central Queensland. She grew up with one biological brother and three adopted siblings from South East Asia. Everton's multicultural family gave her an awareness of issues pertaining to race and culture and how people react to difference and departure from normativity. Her works often include motifs of innocence and thematic references to childhood.

Everton studied photography at the Royal Melbourne Institute of Technology.

== Career ==
At the start of her photographic career, she worked as a cadet photographer for the Melbourne Times, and volunteered in Photographic studios. She has had her images published in several magazines, including Vogue and the New Yorker Magazine. She has also won multiple awards, including First and third prize at the 2010 Paris International Photography Awards, the 2005 Australian Leica Documentary Photographer of the year award, and the 2003 AIPP Australian Professional Photography awards.

== General references ==
- King, Darryn (22 March 2011). "Marionettes". Time Out Sydney.
- Greco, Nell. "Samantha Everton: Interview". Das Platforms. Archived from the original on 28 February 2014.
- Warchomij, Bohdan. "Samantha Everton". Methaphor Online.
