= Everton Vanoni =

Brazilian football coach (born 1981)

Personal information
- Full name: Everton de Paula Vanoni
- Date of birth: 4 July 1981 (age 45)
- Place of birth: Porto Alegre, Brazil

Managerial career
- Years: Team
- 2002–2005: 15 de Novembro (assistant)
- 2005–2007: Ulbra (assistant)
- 2007–2010: Caxias (assistant)
- 2012: Imperial (assistant)
- 2015–2016: Luverdense (assistant)
- 2018: CRB (assistant)
- 2019–2020: São José-RS (assistant)
- 2020: São José-RS
- 2021: Aimoré (assistant)
- 2023: Manaus (assistant)
- 2024: Vila Nova (assistant)

Everton de Paula Vanoni (born 4 July 1981) is a Brazilian football coach. He is the current assistant coach of Manaus.
