= Micky Allan =

Australian photographer and painter (born 1944)

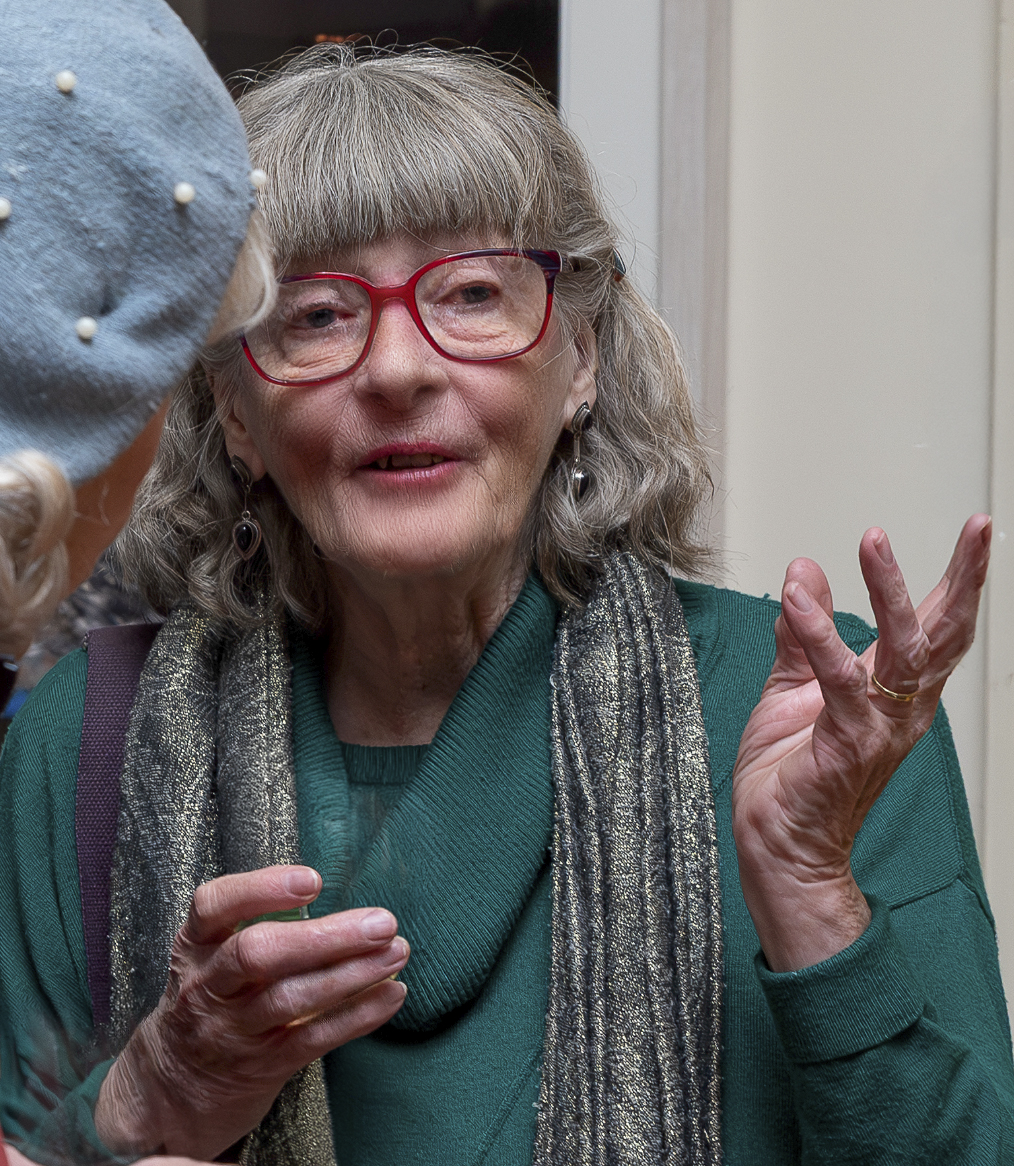
- Micky Allan in 2025
- Born: 1 April 1944 (age 82); Melbourne, Australia
- Education: 1967, Bachelor of Fine Arts, Melbourne University 1968, Diploma of Painting, National Gallery of Victoria School 2014, Doctor of Philosophy, Painting, Australian National University
- Known for: Contemporary Art
- Notable work: My trip 1976; Botany Bay Today (1980–2010)

Micky Allan (born 1944) is an Australian photographer and artist whose work covers paintings, drawings, engraved glass overlays, installations and photography. Allan has become an influential public speaker and has been invited to be a part of many discussions on feminist politics and present a number of speeches held in galleries across Australia about art photography of the 1970s.

== Early life and education ==
Allan was born in Melbourne in 1944. From the age of two, she lived in Japan, before in 1950 her family moved back to Melbourne where Allan attended the Melbourne Church of England Girls Grammar School, in South Yarra. There she received an American Field Service Scholarship allowing her to study in the U.S. Allan took up painting as a teenager and attended a girls school in Kansas City in 1961. The school held Allan's first solo exhibition when her paintings were displayed in a national art contest.

After returning from Kansas, Allan studied Fine Arts at the University of Melbourne under art historian Joseph Burke in 1963. in 1965 she commenced a full-time Diploma of Painting course at the National Gallery of Victoria Art School which she completed in 1967.

== Work ==
Finding it unlikely that she would make a living from painting, Allan began taking photographs in 1974 after joining Melbourne's experimental arts and theatre space, the Pram Factory. She began working on sets and costumes and designing posters for the plays held there and, needing to photograph performances, learned darkroom photographic processing from housemate Virginia Coventry. In 1974, The Pram Factory held her first show of black-and-white photographs. She continued to take photographs devotedly for magazines and began to emerge as a well-known female photographer, garnering commissions around Australia.

=== My Trip ===
In 1975, having finished a body of work in the darkroom, Allan felt a need to go on holiday and took a 17-day road trip through rural Victoria. Allan decided to travel alone, recording photographically what she saw and experienced, which resulted in the series and publication My Trip. It consists of exchanges with people she met. She photographed them and asked them to photograph her in turn, and the images were presented side-by-side with a record of their conversation. The series become a documentation of how women were perceived when travelling alone during the years of second-wave feminism.

=== Hand-colouring ===
Allan associated with a network of feminist photographers that included Sue Ford and Ashe Venn, with whom she exhibited at Abraxas gallery in Manuka, and also in 1975, from her practice in painting, she turned to hand-colouring monochrome photographic prints, as did her colleagues Viva Gibb, Ruth Maddison and Janina Green. Dr Shaune Lakin, Senior Curator of Photography at the National Gallery of Australia, considers Allan to be the initiator of that genre amongst the group. They revived, with a consciously feminist intent, that technique which had been developed by predominantly women retouchers in commercial photography studios for over a century to 'colour' black-and-white portraits and wedding photos. Traditionally hand-colouring involved manually adding colour to a black-and-white photograph, through the materials and techniques of painting and the use of paints, inks and dyes. In the 1970s chromogenic prints from colour negatives had become affordable, though still complex to undertake in a home darkroom, and commercial hand-colouring was disappearing, but for these artists, such manipulation personalised the work and extended the means of creative photographic expression.

Each print from the same negative thereby became a unique work. Gael Newton, writing in Art + Australia remarks that "handcolouring, which Allan more or less pioneered in the 1970s, was seen then as being a feminist strategy that subverted the dominant pure print fetish of mainstream art photography and also, by extension, the one-dimensional realities with which photo naturalism colluded. The philosophical meaning of colour as a continuing essence and site of Allan’s work does not undo the past readings but rather enlarges our understanding of how she has developed her feminism." For a conservative male reaction, Dal Pozzo reports that Max Dupain's contemporaneous declaration was that hand-colouring "should be stamped out".

Allan's first handcoloured works were a series Laurel, of her friend, made in 1975 and shown 4–29 August that year (International Women's Year) in an exhibition at George Paton Gallery organised by Sue Ford; Three Women Photographers. The following year Allan worked on a series titled Babies which became part of a set of ongoing series concerned with life cycles. The first were portraits of babies in high key and contrast with the face filling the frame and delicately coloured in pencil. The work was displayed in the National Gallery of Australia. Allan's fascination with age cycles continued with her 1978 the series, Old Age. In close-up photographs of elderly people, Allan highlighted the physical ageing process which can be regarded as unattractive by society. Allan's work raised humanist concerns and the work has been displayed in many galleries across Australia.

=== A Live-in Show ===
Over 10–26 May 1978, Micky Allan’s first solo exhibition to be held at Ewing and George Paton Gallery at the University of Melbourne was titled Photography, Drawing, Poetry: A Live-in Show (Live-in Show). It was part of director Kiffy Rubbo's staging of a series of ground-breaking feminist exhibitions between 1973–1980, which included Three Women Photographers in 1975, featuring then-emerging photographers; Allan, with Virginia Coventry and Sue Ford. Allan's work was also included in Paton Gallery group shows: Drawing: Some Definitions 22 June–9 July 1976; Security (11 June–3 July 1980); Ten Years: A Decade of the Ewing & George Paton Galleries (9–30 September 1981); Re: Model 7 May–2 June 1989.

A Live-in Show combined installation, of domestic decoration and furniture including a bed, and performance, through Micky's residential presence and interactions with visitors who stayed to cook and eat and who brought their children who played and made art, while a conventional display of framed images from My Trip and Babies and chalk drawings of gladioli flowers was on the walls. Palmer notes that the "exhibition blurred art and life, but went well beyond the merely diaristic" while Ennis positions Allan's act as one that "upheld the values of the counter-culture [by] destroying the barriers between art and life." Live-in Show was restaged in Sydney at the avant-garde Watters Gallery in 1978 and also in Know My Name: Australian Women Artists from 1900 to Now at the Australian National Gallery, 14 November 2020– 9 May 2021.

== Sydney ==
Allan relocated to Sydney in the late 1970s, focusing on her own individual work as opposed to working on collective projects. In 1979 she staged the Handcoloured Photo Show at the Tin Sheds in Sydney.

=== Botany Bay Today ===
Allan's work in 1980 explored the juxtaposition of nature and the industrialization around Botany Bay. The black-and-white photographs consisted mainly of views near the bay, with some more general views of the area including hand-painted images of flowers, with an emphasis on the contrast between the industrial and natural world. The body of this work, exhibited at the NGV in 1980 by curator Jennie Boddington, focused on the industrial devastation of the coastline, raising awareness of the impact it has on daily life.

In 1982 the National Gallery of Australia acquired Allan's photographs through the Philip Morris fund among those of 107 significant Australian photographers of whom 25 were women, including Allan's associates Viva Gibb, Sandy Edwards, Sue Ford, and Ponch Hawkes.

== Painter ==
Allan returned to painting as her primary medium in 1982, a move which Newton addresses in her 1995 Art + Australia article:

Since the early 1980s Allan has disengaged with a dialogue between the graphic and the photographic and returned to painting. Her subject matter and style have become more abstract and metaphorical and centred on a celebration of spirituality and the philosophy of being. [...] Her ‘pure’ paintings of recent years can be connected to the earliest works largely through formal elements of a particular palette of high key colours, acid pastels and intricate layering of line and washes. Allan has articulated her paintings of fantasy gardens as zones in which inner and outer realms of knowledge are explored. These concepts are also extended to her descriptions of the ‘Babies’ series in which colour strength is a key to the path from being to knowingness in babies between the ages of one year and six months (the latter has a red bow!) […] Allan and Hall make their works within some of the oldest and deepest of spiritual and intellectual themes and traditions of western and eastern cultures.

In 1995, Allan said of her own work that:

I made a decision a few years ago not to hold back in any way from generating anything in my work that might issue from my femaleness. I don’t care how delicate, how soft, how subtle it becomes. Love, compassion, beauty, praise. In their clear form they are neither male nor female, but how far have we associated them really with ‘female’ and therefore ‘lesser’, and women also have thrown them off in reaction. In an art world that idealises toughness (rather than spiritedness), ugliness, shock, even anger and hatred, I see young art students struggle every day as they make these qualities internalised shoulds. The question that intrigues me now is: What would women really paint (or perform or install or sculpt or write or curate) if they did it from their heart of hearts?

In an art world that idealises toughness (ratherIn 2010, Allan returned to Botany Bay with a partner, Steenus von Steensen, to find that not a lot had changed from her first visit in 1980, instead the area appeared more dire and grim than it had before. Botany Bay 2010 is a follow up to the 1980 series, but using colour photography with some minimal colour painting. In 2010, Hazelhurst Regional Gallery and Arts Centre held the first exhibition of the series Botany Bay 2010, since which the series has been displayed at national galleries across Australia, alongside Allan's more recent work.

Allan completed her studies for the Doctor of Philosophy, Painting, at the Australian National University of Arts in 2014. In 2022, Allan's work, Micky's Room, featured in Part One of the exhibition, "Know my name: Australian women artists 1900 to now" at the National Gallery of Australia.

== Reception ==
Of Allan's contribution to the exhibition On the Edge: Australian Photographers of the Seventies at The San Diego Museum of Art, California during the first half of 1995 and curated by Gael Newton, Helen Ennis writes that, while little of the work shown warranted attention after the 1970s, "Micky Allan and Bill Henson are two exceptions whose art practice has become richer and more significant."

== Awards / prizes / residencies ==
- 1975 Special Project Grant, Visual Art /Craft Board, Australia Council for the Arts
- 1979 Special Project Grant, Visual Art /Craft Board, Australia Council for the Arts
- 1979 Artist-in-Residence, University of Sydney
- 1982 Maude Vizard-Wholohan Prize, Art Gallery of South Australia (joint award)
- 1983 Michael Karolyi Foundation, Vence, France
- 1985 University of New South Wales Art Purchase Prize
- 1985 Australia Council for the Arts Studio Cité internationale des arts in Paris
- 1990 Artist Development Grant, Visual Arts/Crafts Board of the Australia Council
- 1990 The Melbourne Savage Club Invitation Drawing Prize (joint award)
- 1994 Artist-in-Residence, Canberra School of Art
- 2003 Grant for New Work, Visual Arts/Crafts Board, Australia Council for the arts
- 2006 Artist-in-Residence, Bundanon, NSW
- 2007 Rosalie GascoingneAward, CAPO, Capital Arts Patrons Organisation, Canberra
- 2010 Artist-in-residence (with Steenus von Steensen), Hazelhurst Regional Gallery, Sydney

== Solo exhibitions ==
Allen's solo exhibitions include:

- 1978 Photography, Drawing and Poetry, A Live-in Show, Ewing and George Paton Galleries, University of Melbourne, and Watters Gallery, Sydney
- 1979 Landscapes and People on the Edges of Landscapes, Link Exhibitions, Art Gallery of South Australia
- 1980 Travelogue, Watters Gallery, Sydney
- 1980 Botany Bay Today, NGV, Melbourne and Australian Centre for Photography, Sydney
- 1982 The Pavilion of Death, Dreams and Desire: The Family Room, Adelaide Festival of the Arts
- 1984 Old Age (Project Show), Art Gallery of New South Wales, Sydney
- 1985 Travels without my Aunt, 200 Gertude Street, Melbourne and Watters Gallery, Sydney
- 1986 Recent Works, United Artists Gallery, Melbourne
- 1987 Micky Allan Perspective, 1975-1987, (curator: Jenepher Duncan), Monash University Gallery
- 1988 Places in Space, City Gallery, Melbourne
- 1990 Harvest (with Aleks Danko), Watters Gallery, Sydney & Contemporary Art Centre, Adelaide
- 1990 ACCA Experiments I: For Love of the Divine, Australian Centre for Contemporary Art, Melbourne
- 1991 What is this Thing called Love? Deutscher Brunswick Street, Melbourne
- 1992 Further Travels, Watters Gallery, Sydney
- 1994 Gardens, Watters Gallery, Sydney
- 2003 Parallel Worlds, Helen Maxwell Gallery, Canberra
- 2005 Quietly, Infinity in the Everyday, Helen Maxwell Gallery, Canberra
- 2008 Sunlight and Shadow, Helen Maxwell Gallery, Canberra
- 2008 Inner Weather, Tin Sheds Gallery, Sydney
- 2011 Spacious, Canberra Contemporary Art Space
- 2013 Sea, ANU School of Arts Gallery, Canberra
- 2025, 5 July–26 October: The Power of Delicacy, Sinclair Gallery, Castlemaine Art Museum

== Publications ==
- Allan, Micky; Experimental Art Foundation (Adelaide, S.A.) (1976). My trip. Micky Allan.
- Allan, Micky (1979). Micky Allan. Art Gallery of South Australia.
- Allan, Micky (1987). Micky Allan, perspective 1975-1987. Clayton: Monash University. Department of Visual Arts. Exhibition Gallery. ISBN 0867467827.
