= Viva Gibb =

Australian documentary photographer, printmaker active 1974–2017

- Born: Viva Jillian Gibb; 11 September 1945; Bobinawarrah near Wangaratta
- Died: 4 December 2017 (aged 72); North Melbourne
- Resting place: Linton, Victoria
- Education: Wangaratta Technical College; National Gallery of Victoria Art School; Victorian College of the Arts
- Known for: photography, printmaking
- Movement: social documentary, political posters
- Children: Sybil Gibb and Rupert Duffy

Viva Jillian Gibb (11 September 1945 – 4 December 2017), earlier referred to as Jillian Gibb, was an Australian feminist photographer, printmaker, poster artist, activist, and social documentary practitioner active from 1974–2017.

== Early life and education, 1945–1974 ==
Viva Jillian Gibb was born on 11 September 1945 in Bobinawarrah, a small settlement approximately 30 km south-east of Wangaratta in rural Victoria. The youngest daughter of a livestock-farming family, she was, by her children's account, an animal-loving child somewhat out of context in her rural industry setting. An early art interest was photography.

Viva undertook a diploma of art at Wangaratta Technical College between 1961 and 1965 where in the mid-1950s metalsmith Stuart Devlin had taught and, with Jock Tomlinson, set up a progressive art curriculum that included some photography. One of Gibb's contemporaries there was naïve painter Lorna Chick.

Gibb then moved to Melbourne to study painting at the National Gallery Art School (1965–68), before completing printmaking studies at the Victorian College of the Arts (VCA) over 1973–74. At the VCA photography emerged as her primary medium, initiated through her incorporating old photographs into her silkscreen prints. Her craft as a printmaker carried directly into her photographic printing practice.

She graduated from the VCA in the same year as photographer Sue Ford, at a moment when women photographers in Australia were beginning to assert the personal and everyday as legitimate territory for artistic inquiry, which was a formative ethos in both artists' careers.

== Documentary practice, 1975–1990 ==
In 1975, Gibb moved to 64 Capel Street, West Melbourne, with her two children, Sybil and Rupert. She quickly established her first dedicated darkroom at 72 Capel Street. From this address, she began consistently to record the people and streets around her. She worked primarily with a Rolleiflex twin-lens medium-format camera and a large-format 4×5-inch Graflex Speed Graphic press camera, developing and printing her own silver gelatin prints. Her son Rupert later recalled that: 'she knew exactly how black she wanted her blacks to be and how bright her highlights were and knew her exposures so well that she was rarely wasteful with film'.

The community of West and North Melbourne was her main subject for nearly two decades, and some individuals are revisited: Vincenzo Lamberti next door at 62 Capel Street; Tommy and Maureen at 8 Hawke Street; Sammy at number 12. From 1980, she lived and worked at 10 Hawke Street — the address she retained until her death in 2017 — with her studio on Stanley Street sandwiched between a neighbour and what she described as the "bikie headquarters" squat at number 59. Her subjects ranged across the full social spectrum of the area: wharfies, labourers, market vendors, barbers and tobacconists, café owners, punk squatters, drag queens, single mothers, migrants, refugees, the elderly, and the homeless. As she wrote in the catalogue for the 1986 exhibition The Critical Distance:

The people in my photographs are those who have survived at all odds — socially, racially, and economically — in our essentially bourgeois society; the lonely man next door, the old people who have lived in the area all their lives and are threatened with eviction, the homeless man whose only dream is to have a room of his own'.

The directness, intimacy and ease visible in her portraits are evidence of her personal knowledge of her subjects. NGV catalogue contributor Jennie Boddington observed that: 'It is obvious that Gibb only works with people for whom she feels a strong sympathy and warm interest; her work is entirely free of clinical investigation'. Gibb herself was explicit about her method: "I don't really deal with people I don't know ... I only ask them for a photograph if I am interested in that person, if there is something in the whole story about them ... or some special feature, whether it is their beauty or their personality. Or they've had a really hard time or they've been poor or working hard all their life." From early on, Gibb adopted a consistent portrait approach, prioritising mid or long shots with the subject captured in relation to their environment. By the 1980s her work showed increasing awareness of theoretical discourses around representation. In her 1980 survey 'Photography in the Australian Art Scene' in Art + Australia Christine Godden outlined the context:

The personal is as much a subject for picture-making as the public issue. Robert Ashton, Godwin Bradbeer, Bill Henson, Leonie Reisberg and Jillian Gibb, for example, usually work in this area. Jill Gibb's long and intimate piece One year's work, 1980, is almost a visual diary. These tiny, dark photographs required the viewer's close attention.

Godden is referring to Gibb's 1980 National Gallery of Victoria exhibition One Year's Work, in which photographs were presented as sequences of multiple images—examples now in the NGV collection—and she began incorporating text as a conceptual strategy. Boddington described the resulting works as: 'jewel-like pictures, made up of anything from one to ten small prints ... the words of the titles, understated but often highly allusive, fuse with the pictures to resonate their meaning'. Titles such as Not many of us left now, We had fun in those days, and It is the price of life suggest phrases expressed by the subject during photography sessions, heightening the sense of encounter between photographer, subject and viewer.

=== Capel Street ===
For a period in the mid-1970s, writer Helen Garner and her daughter Alice lived with Gibb at 64 Capel Street. In her memoir contribution to the 2026 exhibition catalogue, Garner recalled the cramped but lively domestic arrangement: "We were single mothers. I had a daughter, she had a daughter and a son; we all moved in together". Helen Ennis identifies Gibb and Sue Ford as exceptional amongst women photographers of the period for having raised children while maintaining a continuous photographic practice. It was during this time that Garner wrote her debut novel Monkey Grip (1977). Garner recalled Gibb as a person of formidable practical and creative capability: "All I could do was write, but Viva was a country woman, a person of awesome practical skills". Garner described how Gibb had been "sinking deeply into her corner of our city, quietly absorbing it and its people into her artist's imagination, her historian's archive ... Her heart was open to the world she had chosen. She served it, she made it hers, and her work shows the profound sincerity of that love."

Both Gibb and Garner were engaged in closely related artistic projects from the same domestic space: Gibb through documentary photography, Garner through candid fiction. Curator Savannah Smith noted the shared sensibility, describing the "intimacy with place" that characterises both bodies of work — built through "local knowledge and the regular, routine movement through the spaces of one's life." By foregrounding the commonplace, both artists broke with fine art and literary traditions about which subjects warranted representation. Boddington commended Gibb's "strong and confident sense of identity" as not "borrowed from foreign sources but formed from the artist's own conviction and sense of things" — a quality that placed her among the first generation of Australian artists to shake off what critics called the "cultural cringe".

== Political posters, 1974–1990s ==
Parallel to her photography, and inspired by the direct-action posters of the Atelier Populaire of the École des Beaux-Arts in Paris during the civil unrest of 1968, to which Gibb had a visceral response, was her series of raw, expressionist protest posters produced from the mid-1970s through the mid-1980s using screen-print, woodcut and linocut: In September 2008 correspondence with Olga Tsara, Gibb explained: "The technique I used most [in screen-printing] was painting on water-based filler which gave a positive image which I could do very quickly, then print them by myself in a little studio ... and then paste them all up [in the streets] at night by myself again. The whole thing taking about two days" She used access facilities at Redletter Press, sometimes with the help of Wendy Black, taking screens to her own studio to print. The efficiency of the printing technique responded to the urgency of the political moment, as Gibb described: "Those were very conservative days and there was a groundswell of artists, writers and in all areas of the arts that were wanting a change in Government's racist, sexist and speciesist attitudes of a very complacent society".

Gibb's earliest acknowledged poster, CIA Assassin (1974), was a direct quotation of the Atelier Populaire's Frey (1968), adapted to comment on American covert operations in the developing world. Among the most enduring posters were those championing animal rights — Alice in Wonderland (1982), This Little Piggy Went to Market (1982), and Why? Man's Monstrous Crime. Vivisection (c. 1980) — alongside anti-nuclear works such as Uranium Shares Boom (1982). A poster of particular personal significance was Pensioners: The Final Solution (1978), based on the hospital room in which her own father was dying, a comment on the inadequacies of the public health system.

Popondetta 1943, Diggers Hanged 34 Fuzzy Wuzzy Angels, Lest We Forget (1978) addressed an act of colonial violence during the Second World War. In May 1978 Barry Jones had revealed in Federal Parliament that during the Second World War Lieutenant-General Sir Edmund Herring had confirmed death sentences on 22 Papuans convicted of handing over seven Anglican missionaries to the Japanese, which Jones called "the darkest secret in modern Australian history". The Papuans had been convicted of offences including murder and treason. Herring claimed that they had been treated fairly under the conventions and circumstances applicable in wartime to defend his "clear conscience about it". Gibb was so moved by the case that she pasted a copy of her poster outside Herring's Toorak house.

Critic Sasha Grishin noted the response to one of Gibb's posters shown in a 1984 exhibit, seen by more than 5,000 visitors, across two venues in Canberra:

The ability to offend through art is always one criterion through which to measure its social relevance. Already, 'Truth Rules ... OK?' has run into some difficulties with the bold poster by Jillian Gibb entitled, Israel's final solution, ordered to be taken down by the Woden Shopping Square authorities. In an exhibition of more than 100 items, all of which set out to challenge the so-called status quo, it is not difficult to predict opposition from some of the defenders of this status quo!

Notably, despite her active participation in the demonstrations and campaigns that defined Melbourne's political life in the 1970s — the Vietnam moratorium and anti-apartheid protests, women's liberation, anti-vivisection, Aboriginal land rights, anti-nuclear movements — and her production of posters expressing such stances, Gibb chose not to photograph these events. Her political engagement in photography remained intimate and personal: people she knew, not anonymous crowds, though like Rennie Ellis, she photographed elderly veterans at Anzac Day.

== Context ==
Gibb was part of a significant cohort of social-documentary photographers working in Melbourne's inner north during the 1970s and 1980s, which included Sue Ford, Micky Allan, Ponch Hawkes, Ruth Maddison, Janina Green, Virginia Fraser, Helen Grace, Virginia Coventry, and Sandy Edwards. Photographer Ruth Maddison, who met Gibb in the 1970s through shared social circles, recalled her in the 2026 exhibition catalogue:

Viva was art school trained in painting and printmaking, and subsequently photography became the main area of her practice. I was in awe of her ability to make powerful work across three different media."

Gibb, Allan, Maddison and Green all applied hand-colouring to their photographs, consciously reviving with a feminist intent, techniques that had been developed by predominantly women retouchers in photography studios for over a century. Maddison credited Gibb's work and friendship as directly supportive and inspiring at the outset of her own photographic career in 1976:

we all embraced feminism and the belief that everyday life was worthy of artistic consideration, and we were mutually supportive as we were bringing it into our work in similar and different ways.

The group articulated the broad concerns of second-wave feminism, responding to the twin maxims of the time — 'the personal is political' and 'think global, act local' — and to postmodern critiques of the documentary tradition. Ennis notes in this regard:

the importance of agreement - indeed, of empathy - between photographer and subject is paramount in these works, regardless of the setting. Take as examples Viva Gibb's photograph of Australian writer Helen Garner, newspaper in hand, and Sue Ford's depiction of her friend Sue Pike drying her hair on the morning of her wedding.

The institutional validation of everyday life in Australian art photography had only recently been established when, in 1974, the NGV curated the first solo exhibition by an Australian photographer, Sue Ford's Time Series. As Ponch Hawkes reflected: 'It struck me like lightning — she had made the ordinary and the commonplace worthy of a place in the NGV. The people weren't great explorers or sportspeople or great beauties or from an exotic other culture. They were "us". Ford's conceptual approach to sequence and the multi-image format finds a clear parallel in Gibb's later work. As Niels Hutchison recalls, Gibb's house and studio became a "social hub" for "artists of all kinds, from the Pram Factory or the nascent Circus Oz."

== Later photography 1980s–2000 ==
In 1982 the National Gallery of Australia acquired Gibb photographs through the Philip Morris fund among those of 107 significant Australian photographers of whom 25 were women, including Gibb's associates Micky Allen, Sandy Edwards, Sue Ford, and Ponch Hawkes.

In the late 1980s, Gibb's commitment to social justice extended beyond Melbourne. She travelled to South Africa to document people's lives in towns and villages under apartheid, and to Hong Kong and China, where she photographed David Goldblatt and the markets and sacred sites for a series titled Of Gods and Animals, commenting on the contrast between spiritual traditions and lived realities.

Returning to Australia, she was struck by the lack of photographic training opportunities for Aboriginal women and approached the Victorian Women's Trust for funding to support a photography cadetship program. The first recipients were Maree Clarke and Kim Kruger — a practical act of mentorship that reflected her long-held beliefs about equitable cultural access. In 1990, she participated in a Koori Women's photography project for the Victorian Women's Trust, and a resulting exhibition, We two are watching (photography by Maree Clarke, Kim Kruger, Sonja Hodge, and Gibb), was shown at Art Moves, 387 Little Bourke Street, Melbourne, in 1991.

Gibb had also, from the mid-1970s, attended multicultural religious events and become concerned that these were of important historical significance that was going undocumented. She noted that "Australia as a whole seemed to have little idea of the wealth of culture embedded in religion and religious ceremonies." This motivated The Way: Religious Ceremonies in Victoria, which became her last substantial photographic series (begun in the 1990s). It documented the formal ceremonies, festivals, dances and processions of multicultural communities — Anglican, Byzantine Orthodox, Oriental Orthodox, Nestorian, Protestant, and multiple branches of Catholicism, as well as Buddhist, Baha'i, Hindu and Muslim communities. The project demanded determination: on one occasion, Gibb recalled, her scarf caught fire during an Ethiopian Orthodox Church ceremony.

In the late 1980s and early 1990s, the community Gibb had so carefully documented began to disperse. Council auctioned off properties in Capel Street and the surrounding area from December 1990, displacing the mix of long-term residents, artists, and countercultural inhabitants who had given the area its character. Age journalist John Stevens, writing in February 1991, condemned the outcome: "Gentrification is about to set in ... A small, vibrant, slightly scruffy community will fade away." Gibb later reflected: "My photos were about ordinary working people who lived and worked in my area which was primarily a working class area of wharfies, labourers etc. It sure has changed now, all those interesting faces which told a story have gone."

During this period, Gibb conducted photography workshops, one of which inspired First Nations artist-photographer Destiny Deacon, who recalled that "In 1990, some friends had been doing a photography workshop with the late Viva Gibb and my housemate, the late Lisa Bellear, decided we'd get into the act, too. My sister Janina was the Indigenous co-ordinator of the Fringe Festival that year and organised a show for the four of us — me, Lisa, Maree Clarke and Kim Kruger. It was the first group show of all Indigenous female photographers in Melbourne. My first pictures Koori Rocks, Gub Words were in that show and things took off for me from there."

Her photographic practice diminished around 2000, brought about in large part by the digital turn in photography, to which she never adapted. Her son Rupert noted: "Something about the enforced economy of the medium, the preciousness of every exposure disappeared." She continued to photograph friends and family informally but returned principally to painting.

== Later life, 2000–2017 ==
Gibb resided in her home at 10 Hawke Street, North Melbourne, until her death. She donated a large part of her archive — 412 black-and-white large-format gelatin silver photographs, 11 cibachromes and 37 posters — to the State Library of Victoria's Picture Collection. She also continued to participate sporadically in exhibition and publication projects.

In 2017, following a terminal diagnosis, Gibb spent her final months painting intensively. Ruth Maddison, who saw her at her last exhibition at Mario's Café in Fitzroy in 2017, described the work: "Beautiful, vibrant, tender paintings, all painted in that last year of her life". She died on 4 December 2017 and was buried under a carved headstone depicting a wombat, at Linton Cemetery in the Golden Plains Shire, Victoria. Maddison concludes her memoir of Gibb with the words: "I do see Viva — her thick, henna-red hair — and I hear her big laugh, every time I see any of her work."

== Legacy ==
Gibb's photographs, most donated by her family, are held in private, and major public, collections across Australia. The donation to the City of Melbourne of her documentary images of the streets and life of North Melbourne in the 1970s and '80s were delivered in an old briefcase.

In 2019, the Monash Gallery of Art (now Museum of Australian Photography) staged A Place in Time, the first public gallery showing of her work in over thirty years. The same year, significant gifts of her photographs and posters were made to the National Gallery of Victoria by her children through the Australian Government's Cultural Gifts Program.

On her selection for the State Library of Victoria exhibition Mirror: New Views on Photography, curator Jade Hadfield remarked that her intention was "finding that diversity, finding the marginalised, finding the overlooked, photographs that told stories counter to the library's historical collecting bias: white, patriarchal, colonial. The archive of social documentary photographer Viva Gibb, who captured secular and sacred rituals of diverse communities across rural and urban Victoria, was invaluable."

In 2025, Sybil Gibb and Rupert Duffy donated more than 200 silver gelatin prints to the Melbourne Art Trust, prompting the City of Melbourne to mount On the Street Where I Live: Viva Gibb's Portrait of North and West Melbourne at City Gallery, Melbourne Town Hall (5 March – 7 August 2026). Curated by Savannah Smith, the exhibition marked the largest presentation of her work in over thirty years and was accompanied by an illustrated catalogue with essays by Helen Garner and Ruth Maddison. Gibb's picture of Garner appears in the 2025/26 National of Victoria exhibition and publication Women Photographers 1900–1975: A Legacy of Light.

Curator of On the Street Where I Live: Viva Gibb's portrait of North and West Melbourne, Smith reflected on Gibb's importance and her body of work as: "a beautiful ode to the character, resilience and warmth of the people who lived and worked in Melbourne's inner city during the fervent decades of the late twentieth century." The curatorial essay concludes: "Viva's portrait of North and West Melbourne is distinctively hers — deeply aware, socially engaged and heartfelt."

== Exhibitions ==
=== Solo exhibitions ===
- 1976: George Paton Gallery, University of Melbourne, Melbourne
- 1978, 2–25 August: Photographs: Jillian Gibb, George Paton Gallery, University of Melbourne
- 1979-1980: One Year's Work, National Gallery of Victoria, Melbourne
- 1981, 7 September–6 November: In the land of the living: photographs by Jillian Gibb, Flinders University Art Museum, South Australia
- 1981: Experimental Art Foundation, Adelaide
- 1991: Experimental Art Foundation, Adelaide
- 2017: Mario's Café, Fitzroy, Melbourne

==== Posthumous ====
- 2019, 27 July – 29 September 2019: A place in time: photographs by Viva Gibb. Museum of Australian Photography (Monash Gallery of Art), Wheelers Hill, Melbourne

=== Group and touring exhibitions ===
- 1974, 18–29 November: Jillian Gibb and Peter Phillips Graduate Exhibition, School of Art, National Gallery, Victorian College of the Arts
- 1979: Tin Sheds Gallery, Sydney
- 1980: 11 June– 3 July: Security: An Ideas Show. With Jude Adams, Micky Allan, Jenny Barber, Wendy Black, Tim Burns, Antonia Chaffey, Bill Clements, John Corbett, Bonita Ely, Jillian Gibb, Helen Grace, Bill Gregory, Gary James, Frances Joseph, Bruce Lamrock, Jan Mackay, Chips Macklnoltv, Fran van Rlemsdyk, Toni Robertson, Rhonda Senbergs, Shan Short, Michael Snelling, Richard Tipping, Steve Turpie, Gary Willis, Paul Worstead. George Paton Gallery, University of Melbourne
- 1981, 9–30 September: Ten Years. A Decade of the Ewing and George Paton Galleries. Mlcky Allan, Margaret Bell, Frances Budden, Tim Burns, James CIayden, Dom De Ciario, Liz Coats, Peter Cole, Tony Colelng, Virginia Coventry, Peter Cripps, Aleks Danko, John Danvers, Isabel Davies, Suzanne Davies, John Davis, Lesley Dumbrell, Bonita Ely, Sue Ford, Jillian Gibb, Christine Godden, Elizabeth Gower, Maurie Hughes, Noel Hutchison, Julie Irving, Peter Kennedy, Chips Macklnolty, Ruth Maddison, Rae Marks, Maggie May, Mlrka Mora, Kevin Mortensen, Clive Murray-White, Ann Newmarch, Robert Owen, Ann Parry, Jon Rhodes, Toni Robertson, Stelarc, Peter Tyndall, Robin Wallace-Crabbe, Jenny Watson, David Wilson
- 1983: National Gallery of Australia, Canberra
- 1983: Artspace, Sydney
- 1984, 11–14 July: Truth Rules...OK? Arts Council Gallery, Gorman House, Ainslie, and Bitumen River Gallery, Manuka
- 1986: The Critical Distance: work with photography, politics, writing. Various venues
- 1986, 3–27 July: An Australian group show. Brian Windridge, Viva Jillian Gibb, Virginia Fraser, Fiona Hall. The Photographers' Gallery, Melbourne
- 1987, 15 May–16 August: Australian contemporary photographers: John Anthony Delacour, Peter Elliston, Jillian Gibb, Ruth Maddison, David Stephenson and Stephen Wickham. Photography Gallery, third floor, National Gallery of Victoria.
- 1988, 20 February – 15 May: Australian Photography 1978–1988
- 13 June – 16 August 1991: We two are watching: photography by Maree Clarke, Kim Kruger, Sonja Hodge, Jillian Viva Gibb. Art Moves, 387 Little Bourke Street, Melbourne (Victorian Women's Trust)
- 1999, 5 June–29: What is this thing Called Photography, Art Gallery of New South Wales

==== Posthumous ====
- 2019, 7 June–31 August: Protest is a creative act. Museum of Australian Photography, Melbourne
- 2019:2 April–26 June: Old ways, new ways. with Tony Albert, Lisa Bellear, Peta Clancy, Brenda L Croft, Viva Gibb, Gail Harradine, Dianne Jones, Leah King-Smith, Michael Riley, Damien Shen, James Tylor. Museum of Australian Photography, Melbourne
- 2019, 8 July–18 September: Return to nature. Museum of Australian Photography, Melbourne
- 2019 Gifts to the NGV collection (photographs and posters). National Gallery of Victoria, Melbourne
- 2023, 19 May 2023 – 28 January 2024: MIRROR: New views on photography. Victoria Gallery, State Library Victoria, Melbourne
- 28 November 2025 – 26 May 2026: Women Photographers 1900–1975: A Legacy of Light. National Gallery of Victoria, Melbourne
- 2026, 5 March–7 August 2026: On the Street Where I Live: Viva Gibb's portrait of North and West Melbourne. City Gallery, Melbourne Town Hall, Melbourne

== Collections ==
- National Gallery of Australia, Canberra; in the Philip Morris Collection, acquired 1982; also included in a collection of postcards, produced for Adelaide Festival of Arts in 1980 for a Festival exhibition with Mac Betts, Charles Blackman, Brian Blanchflower, John Borrack, Robert Boynes, Mike Brown, Erika Calder, Sybil Craig, Ray Crooke, Lawrence Daws, Russell Drysdale, Brian Dunlop, Tom Gleghorn, Michael Green, Pro Hart, Jacqueline Hick, Dale Hickey, Frank Hodgkinson, Kenneth Jack, Robert Juniper, Keith Looby, Brian McKay, Frank Morris, Ann Newmarch, John Olsen, Leon Pericles, Clifton Pugh, Jeff Rigby, Michael Shannon, Gordon Shepherdson, Christine Simons, Mervyn Smith, Tim Storrier, Guy Stuart, Brett Whiteley, Stephen Wickham, James Willebrant, Geoff Wilson, Barbara Zerbini.
- National Library of Australia Canberra: her series The Way: Religious Ceremonies in Victoria
- National Gallery of Victoria, Melbourne
- Art Gallery of New South Wales, Sydney
- State Library of Victoria, Melbourne (412 gelatin silver photographs, 11 cibachromes, 37 posters, donated by the artist)
- Museum of Australian Photography (formerly Monash Gallery of Art), Wheelers Hill, Victoria
- City of Melbourne Art and Heritage Collection (Melbourne Art Trust) — more than 200 gelatin silver prints, donated by Sybil Gibb and Rupert Duffy, 2025
