= Clemenger =

Clemenger may refer to:

== People ==
- Dermot Clemenger, judge on Swedish show, Let's Dance 2010
- Jack Clemenger (1899–1964), Australian tennis player
- John Clemenger (1891–1941), Australian rules footballer

== Other uses ==
- Clemenger Award, a former Australian art prize (1993–2009)
