= Jennie Boddington =

Australian film director and producer

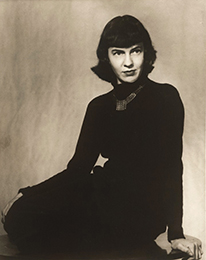
- Jennie Boddington in 1952 photographed by Erwin Rado (1914–1988).
- Born: Jennifer Blackwood; 1922; Melbourne, Australia
- Died: 15 November 2015 (aged 92–93)
- Occupations: Filmmaker, curator and researcher
- Years active: 1940s–1990s

Jennifer "Jennie" Boddington (née Blackwood) (1922 – 15 November 2015) was an Australian film director and producer, who was first curator of photography at the National Gallery of Victoria in Melbourne (1972–1994), and researcher.

== Early life ==
Boddington was born in Melbourne, Australia in 1922. She married in the early 1940s, bearing a son, Tim in 1943. Beginning her career amongst Australia's New Wave of filmmakers in Sydney, she worked as wardrobe assistant with costume designer Dahl Collings on Harry Watt's Ealing feature film The Overlanders (1946), then on eight hundred costumes for Watt's unfinished follow-up, Eureka Stockade (1948).

== Training ==
Boddington entered the Commonwealth Film Unit in 1948 as cutting room assistant and was there for two and a half years making a lifelong friend in Joan Long (scriptwriter and film producer later known for writing Caddie (1976) and producing Puberty Blues (1981)). In 1947/8 the Commonwealth Film Unit, part of the Australian National Film Board, had moved from 66 King Street in Sydney's CBD to 5 Condor Street in Burwood, a suburb of Sydney, into an 1879 Department of Education building, where facilities consisted of cutting rooms, a theatre, a room housing recording equipment, a camera room and office space. The Unit provided tuition that the private companies did not. Boddington trained there with important Australian and Canadian documentary filmmakers including Australian National Film Board Producer-in-Chief, Stanley Hawes, Colin Dean and Ron Maslyn Williams, and her first editing and directorial experience came in working with John Heyer on The Valley Is Ours (1948).

== Zanthus Films ==
Divorced in 1950, she moved back to Melbourne and for six years scripted, edited and directed training films for the Victorian General Post Office film unit.

In 1956, she was employed by ABC TV, where she edited reportage of the Melbourne Olympic Games, and met, then in 1958 married, cinematographer (Newcombe) Adrian Boddington (b. Kalgoorlie, 3 June 1911) and with whom she had three more sons, James (b.1959), Alastair (b.1961) and Nicholas (b.1963).

Establishing together the Zanthus Films partnership, for which she reverted to her family name Blackwood, they operated from their home in Hawthorn, producing documentaries including the BP-commissioned Three in a Million (1959), Port of Melbourne (1961), and You Are Not Alone (1961) on the then tabu subject of breast cancer and mastectomy. These titles were amongst early Australian Film Institute Award winners, as was the film Anzac (1959), scripted by Cyril Pearl, which pioneered the use of historical stills with rostrum camera effects.

== Curator of photography ==
After Adrian Boddington's death at 59 in 1970, Jennie Boddington retired from active film production. She then took up the post of first full-time curator of photography for the National Gallery of Victoria in 1972. She was selected from fifty-three applicants, becoming the first such curator in Australia and perhaps only the third in the world. Her selections of works for exhibition and acquisition were inclusive, not restricted only to 'art' photography, but rather emphasising its value as a medium of communication. Her appointment came at a time when the medium was becoming valuable as a collectible, and when art schools in Australia were adding diplomas and degrees in photography.

Boddington devoted several exhibitions to contemporary Australian photographers including the well known and the recently discovered, giving equal billing to male and female artists; among these were Micky Allan, Jon Rhodes, Carol Jerrems, Viva Gibb, Ruth Maddison, and David Stephenson. She debuted the Geelong landscape photographer Laurie Wilson, and promoted the work of the young Bill Henson recognising his talent with his first major exhibition while he was still a student. She defended this emphasis in a response to a January 1983 article in The Age by critic Geoff Strong, writing;

...he castigates the National Gallery of Victoria for demonstrating "a reluctance to show new contemporary work, acting rather as a photographic art museum" (which is precisely what we are!). In three out of the four exhibitions for 1982, this institution showed work by living Australians, 19 in all and 11 of whom are not from Melbourne. Landscape, Australia included work by four living Australians (Mark Johnson, Sydney; Tom Psomotragos, Melbourne; Stephen Wickham, Melbourne; Richard Woldendorp, Perth). Portraits by Camera 1 and 2 included work from the 1840s to the present day, both international and Australian, with modern examples by Ted Cranstone, Sydney; Max Dupain, Sydney; Michael Gallagher, Perth: Anthony Green, Melbourne; Julie Millowick, Melbourne; Max Pam, Sydney (resident in Brunei); Axel Poignant, London; John Radvansky, Hobart; Margaret Rich, Ballarat; Henry Talbot, Melbourne. Five of these photographers are young and might be described as contemporary. Honoring Trees included an extended work by Wesley Stacey of New South Wales, with examples by John Cato, Max Dupain, Anthony Green and John Wilkins aiso.

Important early Australian photography was given space, including that of Fred Kruger whose prints and glass plates were brought to the curator by his descendants, and also the Antarctic photographers Frank Hurley and Herbert Ponting. Christine Godden in her survey 'Photography in the Australian Art Scene' in Art and Australia in 1980, remarks that the NGV's remained then:

the only photography department in a State or Regional gallery with a full-time curator, an adequate purchasing budget, a properly housed collection and a permanent display space. In the late 1960s and early 1970s, important MOMA exhibitions were seen: The Photographer's Eye, Brassai and Bill Brandt. Since the appointment of Mrs Jennie Boddington, as Curator of Photography, the Gallery has had a continuous and varied programme of photography exhibitions. Perhaps the most interesting was the 1978 exhibition that Mrs Boddington researched, Antarctic Photographs (1910-1916)'by Herbert Ponting and Frank Hurley. It was both a fascinating historical record and a commentary on the prevailing photographic vision of that time.

Boddington's experience as a documentary film researcher and scriptwriter enabled some original insights in publications; Russell Drysdale's use of colour photography as an aide-mémoire was posited in an exhibition she curated in 1987, and in her catalogue essay, which reveals in previously unknown photographic imagery this method of working and Drysdale's expressive stylisation in interpretation of colour, subject matter and specific locations.

In her role Boddington toured Europe, London and America in 1975, meeting photographers André Kertész and Bill Brandt as well as John Szarkowski, director of the Museum of Modern Art, an experience that influenced her ideas about curatorship, and leading her to decide that the acquisition of important overseas material should become a priority. To this end, South African apartheid photographer David Goldblatt and the equally controversial Czech Jan Saudek were given major exhibitions (which were amongst these photographers' first shows internationally) and their works purchased, during Boddington's tenure.

== Later life ==
Returning to Sydney in 1994 at age 72, Boddington went on to work as a free-lance researcher, cataloguing the files and photographic archives of Walkabout and other collections in The Mitchell Library, and contributing to the Australian Dictionary of Biography. She died on 15 November 2015, in Melbourne.

== Publications ==
- National Gallery of Victoria & Boddington, Jennie, 1922– & Sun News Pictorial (1972). Fifty years of press photography, 1922–1972. [National Gallery of Victoria], [Melbourne, Vic.]
- YWCA (Australia) & Boddington, Jennie (1975). Woman 1975. East Melbourne
- Beaton, Cecil Sir & Boddington, Jennie, 1922– & National Gallery of Victoria (1975). Cecil Beaton's camera. National Gallery of Victoria, Melbourne
- Boddington, J. (1 January 1975). J. W. Lindt, photographer (1845–1926). Art Bulletin of Victoria / Publ. by the Council of Trustees of the National Gallery of Victoria, Victorian Arts Centre, 23–27.
- Boddington, Jennie, 1922– & National Gallery of Victoria (1976). Modern Australian photographs : 28 April-27 June 1976. National Gallery of Victoria, Melbourne
- Borcoman, J., Jack, R. I., Boddington, J., Turner, P., Gaskins, B., Howe, G., Brown, J. L., ... Maynard, M. (1977). Photography in Australia: A conference on photography as communication medium and art form. Sydney: University of Sydney, Dept. of Adult Education.
- National Gallery of Victoria; Boddington, Jennie, 1922–2015 (1985), Milestones in the art : famous photographs in gravure, National Gallery of Victoria, pp. 33–39
- Boddington, Jennie, 1922– (1978). Antarctic photographs, 1910–1916 : Herbert Ponting Scott expedition (1910–13), Frank Hurley Mawson expedition (1911–13), Shackleton expedition (1914–16). Sun Books, South Melbourne, Vic
- Boddington, Jennie, 1922– & National Gallery of Victoria (1978). Six series. National Gallery of Victoria, [Melbourne, Vic
- Boddington, Jennie (1978). Laurie Wilson's landscapes and Jon Rhodes' Australia : Photography Gallery, June 7. National Gallery of Victoria, [s.l]
- National Gallery of Victoria & Boddington, Jennie, 1922– (1979). Australian photographs from the collection. National Gallery of Victoria, Melbourne
- Hurley, Frank, 1885–1962 & Ponting, Herbert, 1870–1935 & Boddington, Jennie, 1922– (1979). Antarctic photographs, 1910–1916. London [etc.] Macmillan
- Ponting, Herbert & Hurley, Frank, 1885–1962 & Boddington, Jennie, 1922– (1979). 1910–1916 Antarctic photographs : Scott, Mawson and Shackleton expeditions. Macmillan, South Melbourne, Vic
- Boddington, Jennie & National Gallery of Victoria (1980). Micky Allan : Botany Bay today : Jillian Gibb : One year's work. The Gallery, Melbourne
- National Gallery of Victoria & Boddington, Jennie, 1922– & Wilson, Laurie, 1920–1980 (1982). Laurie Wilson. National Gallery of Victoria, Melbourne
- Boddington, J., & National Gallery of Victoria. (1983). In the lucky country: Panoramas by Jillian Gibb, Anthony Green and Merryle Johnson : Photography Gallery, National Gallery of Victoria, Melbourne, 1 June-18 September 1983. Melbourne: The Gallery.
- Boddington, Jennie, 1922– & National Gallery of Victoria (1983). International photography : 100 images from the collection of the National Gallery of Victoria. The Gallery, [Melbourne]
- National Gallery of Victoria & Boddington, Jennie, 1922– (1984). International photography : selected from the collection of the National Gallery of Victoria. The Gallery, Melbourne
- National Gallery of Victoria & Boddington, Jennie, 1922– (1984). Architecture and photography 1848–1982 : photographs from the collection. National Gallery of Victoria, Melbourne
- National Gallery of Victoria & Boddington, Jennie, 1922– & Art Gallery of Ballarat (1985). Australian landscape photographed : an exhibition of photographs from the collection of the National Gallery of Victoria. National Gallery of Victoria, [Melbourne]
- Boddington, Jennie, 1922– & National Gallery of Victoria (1987). Australian contemporary photographers : John Anthong Delacour, Peter Elliston, Jillian Gibb, Ruth Maddison, David Stephenson and Stephen Wickham. National Gallery of Victoria, Melbourne
- Boddington, Jennie & Drysdale, Russell Sir, 1912–1981 & National Gallery of Victoria (1987). Drysdale, photographer. National Gallery of Victoria, 1987, Melbourne
- Boddington, Jennie & State Library of Victoria (1989). The new art : photographs by William Henry Fox Talbot (1800–1877), La Trobe Collection, State Library of Victoria : Fox Talbot and the invention of photography. State Library of Victoria, [Melbourne, Vic.]
- Boddington, J. (2002). 'Wilson, Lawrence George (1920–1980)', Australian Dictionary of Biography, National Centre of Biography, Australian National University, https://adb.anu.edu.au/biography/wilson-lawrence-george-12048/text20421, published first in hardcopy 2002, accessed online 10 June 2015. This article was first published in hardcopy in Australian Dictionary of Biography, Volume 16, (MUP), 2002

== Films (selected) ==
- Blackwood, J., & Australia. (1952). Jonathan's project. Australia: Postmaster General's Dept. An account of telephone services in country and city as seen through the eyes of a schoolboy doing a school project.
- Martin-Jones, J., Blackwood, J., & Australian News and Information Bureau. (1952). Apples for export Australia: News and Information Bureau [production company].
- Blackwood, Jennie & Boddington, Adrian & BP Australia & Zanthus Films (1959). Three in a million. Zanthus Films, Melbourne, Vic. The story of three of the million migrants who reached Australia after the end of the war. An Italian boy in Melbourne, an Englishwoman on a South Australian farm, and a German scientist working on the Snowy Mountains scheme; all of them, in their different ways, contributing to the development of their adopted country. (Winner 1960 AFI Award for Documentary film. Included in the 1959 MIFF, Programme 22 ).
- Fenton, Peter & Pearl, Cyril. (Writer of accompanying material) & Marks, Herbie. (Arranger) & Powell, Moray. (Commentator) & Boddington, Adrian. (Producer) & Blackwood, Jennie (Director), et al. (1960). Anzac. Zanthus Films [production company], Australia. (27 min.) : sd., b&w; 16 mm.
- Blackwood, J., Boddington, A., Armstrong, B., Badger, H., Anti-Cancer Council of Victoria., & Zanthus Films. (1961). You are not alone. Anti-Cancer council of Victoria. A woman reports a suspected cancer early and undergoes a successful operation.
- Morgan, John. (Commentator); Fenton, Peter; Boddington, Adrian. (Producer); Clark, Bruce. (Arranger); Blackwood, Jennie. (Director); Melbourne Harbor Trust; Zanthus Films (1961), Port of Melbourne, Zanthus Films [production company] : Melbourne Harbor Trust Commissioners [sponsor]. (Second, Bronze 1962 AFI Award for Public Relations film) (27 min.) : sd., col.; 16 mm.
- Prod Co: Australian Commonwealth Film Unit; West, John. (Commentator); Martin-Jones, John. (Producer); Blackwood, Jennie. (Director); Allen, Alan; Australian Commonwealth Film Unit; Zanthus Films (1963), Sir John Monash, Zanthus Films [production company] : Australian Commonwealth Film Unit [production company] (29 min.) : sd., b&w; 16mm
- Blackwood, Jennie & Boddington, Adrian & Zanthus Films (1963). Sweet Are The Fruits, Zanthus Films, Melbourne, Vic. (Honourable Mention 1963 AFI Award for Public Relations film).
