= Angela Cavalieri =

Australian printmaker

Angela Cavalieri (born 1962) is an Australian printmaker, whose work recreates text and narratives in visual form and was included in the Venice Biennale, 2011.

== Early life and education ==
Cavalieri's parents migrated from Calabria, Italy, to Australia in the post-war period. She studied printmaking at the Victorian College of the Arts from 1981 to 1983.

== Career ==
Cavalieri exhibited in solo and group exhibitions from 1984, and in 2011 was included in The Venice Biennale, Italian Pavillion In The World Project, 2011. She also won the Manly Library Artist Book Award in 2011.

She has been awarded several prizes and has undertaken a number of artist residencies in Europe and Australia. Her work is held in public and private collections throughout Australia, notably Australian National Gallery, The National Gallery of Victoria, State Library of Queensland, Baillieu Library, University of Melbourne and State Library of Victoria. She is also represented in the Musée d'Art et d'Histoire, Geneva, Switzerland.

== Art practice ==
Text, language and the transformative nature of culture are recurring themes in Cavalieri's art practice, referencing in particular her Italian heritage. Her work has been described as "visually seductive, monumental in their proportions and immediate in their impact" by the art historian Sasha Grishin.

She surveys the art of writing and storytelling in a visual form in a series of monumental, hand-rolled linocuts on canvas as well as producing small-scale artist's books.

Passages from Dante, Petrarch, Italo Calvino and the influences of Italian artists such as Piero della Francesca, Giotto and Piranesi are referenced in her work. The music of the Italian composer Claudio Monteverdi (1567-1643) also provided Cavalieri with inspiration, as a result of an Arts Centre Melbourne commission to produce a work about an opera in 2011, the State Library of Victoria's Creative Fellowship (2012-2013) and a residency at La Scuola Internazionale di Grafica Residency in Venice (2015), exploring the city where Monteverdi lived in the last decades of his life.

== Awards and residencies ==
- National Gallery of Victoria Trustee Award, 1981
- Desiderius Orban Youth Award, Australia Council, 1984
- Mitchell Endowment Acquisition Prize, National Gallery of Victoria, 1985
- Overseas Studio Grant Paretaio, Italy, Australia Council, 1986
- Project Grant, Visual Arts/Craft Board, Australia Council, 1990
- Sutherland Acquisitive Prize, Sutherland Shire Council, NSW, 1999
- Shell Fremantle Print Award, Western Australia, 1999
- Conrad Jupiter Acquisitive Prize, Gold Coast City Gallery, Queensland, 2000
- Grand Prize, The Silk Cut Print Award, 2000
- Artists-in-Schools Program Grant, Arts Victoria, 2001
- Australia Council Residency, The British School at Rome, Italy, 2003
- Dame Elisabeth Murdoch Travel Sponsorship for Academici at The British School at Rome, Italy 2005
- Edith Cowan University Residency, Perth, Western Australia, 2005
- RMIT Summer Residency and exhibition at Project Space/Spare Room, 2007-8
- Dreams of Art Spaces Collected, Projektraum Deutscher Künstlerbund, Berlin, Germany, 2007
- Piramidon, Centre for Contemporary Art, Residency, Barcelona, Spain, 2008
- Geelong Print Prize Acquisitive Award, 2009
- Australia Council Studio Grant for Barcelona, Spain, 2010
- Manly Library Artist Book Award, 2011
- State Library Victoria Creative Fellowship, Melbourne, Victoria, 2012
- La Scuola Internazionale di Grafica Residency, Venice, Italy, 2015

== Exhibitions ==
=== Selected solo exhibitions ===
- Gertrude Contemporary (formerly 200 Gertrude Street Gallery, Fitzroy, Victoria), 1986
- Syme Dodson Gallery, Sydney, NSW, 1990
- Christine Abrahams Gallery, Melbourne, 1990
- 'Recent Works', 108 Moor Street, Fitzroy, Victoria, 1996
- Smyrnios Gallery Australia, Melbourne, 1998
- Quattro Pagine, Motor Works Gallery, Melbourne, 1999
- Motor Works Gallery, Melbourne, 2001
- Città Scritta, Ovens Street Studios, Melbourne, 2004
- Scripta Manent, Artspace Mackay, Queensland, 2006
- Racconto: the Narrative and Text of Angela Cavalieri, The ICON Museum of Art, Deakin University, Burwood Campus, Melbourne, Victoria, 2007
- Passaggi Scritti, Gallery 101, Collins Street, Melbourne, Victoria, 26 February - 22 March 2007
- Chiacchierone, Australian Galleries, Smith Street, Collingwood, Victoria, 3–27 February 2011
- Canzone: Music as Storytelling, Fortyfivedownstairs, Flinders Lane, Melbourne, Victoria, 29 September - 24 October 2015
- Canzone: Music as Storytelling, Northern Centre for Contemporary Art, Darwin, Northern Territory, 9 April - 7 May 2016

=== Selected group exhibitions ===
- National Works on Paper, Mornington Peninsula Regional Gallery, Victoria, 2004
- SMS Artists use TXT, Gold Coast City Gallery, Queensland, 2004
- Lost in Translation, Spectrum Project Space, Perth, Western Australia, 2005
- Seven Stories, Counihan Gallery, Brunswick, Victoria, 2005
- Bookscapes: exploring contemporary Australian artist's book, Port Jackson Press Print Room, Melbourne, Victoria, 2005
- Plimsoll Gallery, University of Tasmania, 2005
- The Academy Gallery, The British School at Rome, Italy, 2005
- Academici: The Australia Council Visual Arts/Crafts Board Rome Studio Residency 1999-2004, Monash University Gallery, Caulfield East, Victoria, 16 March - 13 April 2005
- Swan Hill Print & Drawing Acquisitive Awards, Swan Hill Regional Gallery, Victoria, 2006
- Art Bound: a selection of artists' books, University of Melbourne, Victoria, 23 May - 26 July 2006
- Lexicon, Gallery @ City Library, Melbourne, Victoria, 2006
- Bookish, Australian Galleries, Collingwood, Victoria, 2006
- City of Hobart Art Prize, Tasmanian Museum and Art Gallery, Tasmania, 2006
- Meeting Place, Keeping Place, George Adams Gallery, Arts Centre Melbourne, Victoria, 2006
- PROOF: Contemporary Australian Printmaking, The Ian Potter Centre, NGV Australia, Federation Square, Melbourne, 9 December 2006 - 1 April 2007
- Burnie Print Prize, Burnie Regional Gallery, Tasmania, 2007
- Works on Paper Prize, City of Banyule, Victoria, 2007
- Lessons in History Vol. 1, Grahame Galleries + Editions, Queensland, 2007
- Transitions: European Island and Regional Cultures in Late 20th & Early 21st Centuries, Macquarie University Gallery, Sydney, NSW, 2008
- Anthology: selection of works by nine Gallery 101 artists who display the diversity of their multidisciplinary individual artistic practices, Gallery 101, Collins Street, Melbourne, 3–28 June 2008
- Surveying the Field, Counihan Gallery, Brunswick, City of Moreland - selection of works by seven leading Australian artists, living or working in the arts in Moreland, 17 July - 16 August 2009
