= Pat Larter =

Australian artist (1936–1996)

- Born: 1936
- Died: 1996 (aged 59–60)

Patricia Larter (1936–1996) was an Australian artist who worked across mail art, video, photography, performance and painting. She was "one of the leading figures in the movement known as 'international mail art'". She is credited with coining the term "femail art" that was taken up by other mail artists around the world.

== Life ==
Born 8 July 1936 in Leytonstone, Essex Patricia Florence Larter (Née Holmes) the elder of two daughters Pat and her family lived at Canvey Island. Her father died of TB when she was young and her wages were needed to support the family.

Pat met her long time collaborator and husband Richard Larter at Perfect Lambert & Co where they were both employed. They married on 18 February 1953 when Pat was just sixteen and migrated to Australia in 1962. They had five children Lorraine, Nicholas, Derek, Diane and Eliza.

Settling in Luddenham, New South Wales the Larter's stayed until 1982 when they moved to Yass, New South Wales.

Pat died on 6 October 1996, an untimely death from cancer.

== Art ==
Larter's art aimed to "parody what she described as 'malegiven sexual stereotypes', largely focusing on the ephemeral forms of performance and mail art". She "exchanged art with an enormous range of international artists and represented Australia in all major exhibitions of postal art". "Her collection of mail art (now held in the research library of the AGNSW) is the most comprehensive one accumulated in Australia." "Her foray into painting was brief, interrupted by her death in 1996."

Femail Art’, her "feminist answer to mail art" was taken on by female mail artists worldwide including Anna Banana who used the term "in the title concept of VILE magazine vol. 6, no 3"

== Pat and Dick ==
Larter features in many of Richard's paintings and is frequently described as his muse. The boundaries between their individual practices often overlap. "Under Pat’s direction, Richard took the photographs of her that she used in her work but he also used those photographs as sources for his paintings. The pair also produced many collaborative super-8 films and prints." Their individual work shares themes and motifs.

In her mail art all correspondence and mailings posted by Larter, that included works made individually or in collaboration, were signed "Pat & Dick" or "Pat and Richard Larter".

== Exhibitions ==
=== Selected solo exhibitions ===
- 2015, Femail Art, Mailbox Art Space, Melbourne
- 2013 Paintings, Watters Gallery, Sydney
- 2011 Paintings, Watters Gallery, Sydney
- 2009 Abstract and Figurative Paintings, Legge Gallery, Sydney
- 2005 Paintings, Legge Gallery, Sydney 2003 Abstract and Figurative Paintings, Legge Gallery, Sydney
- 2002 Paintings, Legge Gallery, Sydney 2001 Paintings (unexhibited work 1992-1994), Legge Gallery, Sydney
- 1999 Patricia Larter 1936-1996, Legge Gallery at Watters Gallery, Sydney
- 1997 Pat Larter, Legge Gallery, Sydney 1996 Mirror Mirror On The Wall, Legge Gallery, Sydney
- 1995 New Paintings and Super Scans With Glitter, Legge Gallery, Sydney 1994 Allusions and Illusions, Legge Gallery, Sydney
- 1993 Bedazzled, Legge Gallery, Sydney 1992 Rhapsody in Colour, Legge Gallery, Sydney
- 1991 Laser Prints, Manfred Stirnemann Gallery, Zurich, Switzerland
- 1986 Mail Art Show, Artists' Union, Osaka, Japan

=== Selected group exhibitions ===
- 2015 See You At The Barricades, Art Gallery of New South Wales, Sydney
- 2014 Glitter: Pat Larter vs Lola Ryan, Lawrence Wilson Art Gallery, University of Western Australia
- 2013 Like Mike, Sarah Scout Presents, Melbourne
- 2011 Frank's Flat, Maitland Regional Art Gallery, NSW
- 2010 Art Month Sydney, Watters Gallery, Sydney
- 2010 Melbourne Art Fair, Royal Exhibition Building, Melbourne
- 2010 Summer Exhibition, Watters Gallery, Sydney
- 2009 Summer Exhibition, Watters Gallery, Sydney
- 2008 Richard Larter: A Retrospective, National Gallery of Australia, Canberra
- 2008 Melbourne Art Fair 2008, Royal Exhibition Building, Melbourne
- 2007 Summer Show, Legge Gallery, Sydney
- 2007 Art Sydney '07, Royal Hall of Industries, Moore Park, Sydney
- 2006 Larter Family Values, Travelling exhibition : University of Tasmania Centre for the Arts; Queensland University of Technology & Liverpool Regional Museum
- 2006 Group Show, Legge Gallery, Sydney
- 2006 Summer Show, Legge Gallery, Sydney
- 2006 Melbourne Art Fair 2006, Royal Exhibition Building, Melbourne
- 2005 Summer Show, Legge Gallery, Sydney
- 2004 Melbourne Art Fair 2004, Royal Exhibition Building, Melbourne
- 2003 Summer Show, Legge Gallery, Sydney
- 2002 Stripperama: The Work of Richard Larter, Heide Museum of Modern Art, Melbourne
- 2002 Melbourne Art Fair 2002, Royal Exhibition Building, Melbourne
- 2002 Group Show, Legge Gallery, Sydney
- 2002 Summer Show, Legge Gallery, Sydney
- 2000 Ten Years, Legge Gallery, Sydney Sixth Australian, Legge Gallery, Sydney
- 2000 Summer Exhibition, Legge Gallery, Sydney
- 1999 Exploratory Behaviour, National Gallery of Victoria
- 1999 10Th Summer Exhibition, Legge Gallery, Sydney
- 1998 Christmas Show, Legge Gallery, Sydney
- 1997 Sanguine Valediction, Legge Gallery, Sydney
- 1996 Mellow Down Easy (Dedicated to Pat Larter), Legge Gallery, Sydney
- 1996 5Th Australian Contemporary Art Fair, Royal Exhibition Building, Melbourne
- 1996 Richard Larter and Pat Larter Super Scans, Watters Gallery, Sydney
- 1996 Adelaide Biennial of Australian Art, Art Gallery of South Australia
- 1995 Ironsides, Powerhouse Museum, for Armidale Regional Gallery
- 1995 Summer Exhibition, Legge Gallery, Sydney
- 1994 Fourth Australian Contemporary Art Fair 2002, Royal Exhibition Building, Melbourne
- 1994 Artists Don't Believe in Sanity Clause, Legge Gallery, Sydney
- 1993 After the Field..., Utopia Gallery, Sydney After the Field..., Manly Art Gallery, Sydney
- 1993 Pat Larter's Rhythms & Peter Maloney's Blues, Rom Gallery, Sydney Tempest, Legge Gallery, Sydney
- 1992 Abstract: The Non-objective, MOCA, Brisbane
- 1992 Thisness, Legge Gallery, Sydney

== Selected bibliography ==
- ACT 1: The Arts Council of Australia, catalogue and publication, November 1978
- Adelaide Biennial of Australian Art, catalogue 1996
- Australian World Theatre Exchange: The Theatre Board of Australia Council,
- Binns, Vivienne: Art & Australia, obituary 1996
- Foster, Ernest : A Public of Individuals, Vol.1 No.2 Sept/Oct 2002
- Gellatly, Kelly: Stripperama, catalogue to exhibition, Heide Museum of Modern Art, Melbourne
- Hart, Deborah : artonview, Issue 54, Winter 2008
- Hart, Deborah : Richard Larter: A Retrospective, National Gallery of Australia publication, 2008
- Heary, Monica: Liverpool Leader, 'Arts or tarts', 22/8/2007
- Heary, Monica: Liverpool Leader, 'Frankly, it's a studnasium', 28/8/2007
- Hynes, Victoria: The Sydney Morning Herald, 'Metro Arts', 5/7/2002
- James, Bruce: Sydney Morning Herald, 'The Picture's in the Mail' mailart review AGNSW archives, 7/8/99
- James, Bruce: Richard Larter: A Retrospective, National Gallery of Australia, Canberra
- Liverpool Leader, 'Larter-day eccentrics live in art', 8/8/2007
- Liverpool City Champion, 'Larter Family Valuest', 1/8/2007
- Lobley, Katrina: The Sydney Morning Herald, 'Larter Family Values, 9/8/2007
- McDonald, John: The Sydney Morning Herald, Obituary, 17/10/1996
- McKenzie, Robyn: The Age, 'A colourful, well-stocked Larter
- Mendelssohn, Joanna: The Australian, 4/8/1995
- Mendelssohn, Joanna: The Australian, 'Joy through Liberated Art' 18/10/1996
- Mendelssohn, Joanna: Art & Australia, 'Exposing Pat Larter' Vol. 42 No.3 2005
- Mendelssohn, Joanna: Larter Family Values, exhibition catalogue, Liverpool City Gallery, 2006
- Mendelssohn, Joanna: Liverpool Leader, 'opiniont' 12/9/2007
- 'Muse and partner unveiled': Daily Telegraph, 18/8/2007
- Tarasov, Anne : Liverpool City Champion, 'Larters launch their Art' 8/82007
- Tarasov, Anne : Liverpool City Champion, 'Beholder beware' 22/82007
- Tsoutas, Nicholas: Larter Family Values, exhibition catalogue forward 2006

== Collections ==
- National Gallery of Australia
- Art Gallery of South Australia
- Art Gallery of New South Wales
- Art Gallery of Western Australia
- Allen Arthur Robinson
- National Gallery of Victoria

== See also ==
- Australian art
