= Three in a Million =

- Directed by: Jennie Blackwood
- Written by: Jennie Blackwood
- Produced by: Adrian Boddington
- Cinematography: Adrian Boddington
- Music by: Nigel Butterley
- Release date: 1959
- Running time: 48 min
- Country: Australia
- Language: English

Three in a Million is a 1959 Australian documentary film which looks at the lives of three migrants in Australia, an Italian man, an English woman and a German man, each living in different areas of Australia. The film won the 1960 Australian Film Institute award for Best Documentary.
