= Rew Hanks =

Australian printmaker

- Born: 19 May 1958; Sydney
- Occupation: Printmaker
- Notable work: linocut print

Rew Hanks (born 19 May 1958) is an Australian printmaker who specialises in hand painted linocut. Hanks is known for his highly detailed works that explore Australian cultural histories whilst also making wry social commentaries.

Born in 1958, in Sydney, New South Wales, Australia, Hanks holds a Master of Fine Arts from the University of Sydney, College of Fine Arts.

By using the medium of linocut, Hanks replicates the appearance of 18th century prints, often combining the people and cultural images associated with Australia's early colonial period. He surrounds his subjects with ethnographic objects and loose Australian iconography to invite viewers to reflect on their own histories, beliefs about indigenous resistance, colonisation and Australia's cultural and social history.

Hanks' works are held in the collections of the National Gallery of Australia, the Art Gallery of South Australia, Artbank, the Art Gallery of New South Wales, and other regional and international collections. Subjects of Hanks' art works have included Joseph Banks (The Hunter and collector), Dame Nellie Melba and Russell Crowe (Peaches and cream 2022), Napoleon Bonaparte (Napoleon in exile 2022), Gerard Krefft (Krefft's chair 2022) and Captain James Cook (Fish between the flags 2023).

In 1991, Hanks was awarded a Print Fellow from the Tamarind Institute at the University of New Mexico in the United States of America.

== Awards ==
- 2008 - Grand Prize in the 8th Bharat Bhavan International Biennial of Print-Art, Bhopal, India
- 2008 - Geelong Print Prize, Geelong, Victoria
- 2011 - First Prize in the IV International Print Exhibition, Istanbul, Turkey
- 2013 - Silkcut Award for Linocut Prints, Melbourne
- 2014 - First Prize in the 9th Kochi International Triennial Exhibition of Prints, Kochi, Japan
- 2014 - City of Hobart Art Prize
- 2015 - Trienniale Print Prize in the 4th Bangkok Triennale International Print and Drawing, Bangkok, Thailand
- 2019 - Hornsby Art Prize with Josephine’s Ark
- 2019 - Fremantle Arts Centre Print Award with Gone Fishing East of Faskrudfjordur
- 2019 - Burnie Print Prize
- 2020 - Lerida Estate Acquisitive Prize
- 2020 - Megalo International Print Prize

Hanks has been a finalist on numerous occasions for the Blake Prize, the Basil Sellers Art Prize and National Works on Paper.
