= Ah Xian =

Chinese born artist based in Sydney, Australia (born 1960)

Ah Xian (Chinese: 阿仙; born 1960) is a Chinese-born artist based in Sydney, Australia.

== Early life ==
Ah Xian was born Liu Jixian (刘继先) in Beijing, in 1960. His parents worked at Renmin University and Beijing Institute of Technology. After graduating high school, Ah Xian attended two years at a technical school as a mechanical fitter and worked at a factory. Ah Xian taught himself how to paint, starting with nude paintings, often paired with a lotus motif against the urban architecture of Beijing, and associated with the Stars Art Group, acting as a courier for the transport of the group's art. Member Li Shuang mentored him and introduced Ah Xian to various historical Western artists. In 1983, he was arrested and interrogated over his nude artworks, which were in violation of the Anti-Spiritual Pollution Campaign, leading to an overnight jail stay and the confiscation of some of the paintings. He decided to become a full-time artist in 1982 and while living in Shenzhen, he adopted the name Ah Xian in 1983. He returned to Beijing and produced a number of works during the New Enlightenment movement in 1985.

In January 1989, Ah Xian travelled to Australia for a two-month artist residency at the University of Tasmania. He returned to Beijing that same spring, and with the beginning of Tiananmen Square protests in April, he subsequently accepted another offer from Australia to be present for an art exhibit in Sydney. Upon arriving in Australia in September 1990, Ah Xian filed for asylum. Though his application was initially rejected in 1989, he was granted residency in 1995.

In 1994, Ah Xian began utilizing porcelain, which he fired in a personal kiln, having previously mostly used plaster. His growing preference of porcelain in his works led to him starting a letter correspondence with Zou Xiaosong, vice director of the Jingdezhen Ceramic University. In May 1996, after several months, Ah Xian was convinced to travel to Jingdezhen to learn more about ceramics and the history of Jingdezhen as a city, due to its renown as the global "porcelain capital". This decision is credited with reconnecting Ah Xian with his native China, though he had already returned the same year to visit his terminally ill mother. Ah Xian showed off his resulting works at the Asian Arts Society of Australia Contemporary Asian Art Forum in October 1998. While maintaining regular residence in Sydney, he spends six months each year in an apartment in Songzhuang, Beijing, known for its artist community, to produce most of his works.

== Art exhibitions ==
- Metaphysica (2007). Metaphysica includes a series of bronze busts. Each bust is different from the rest in that there is a different object on the head of each bust. Ah Xian chose the objects individually as each of them referenced Chinese mythological or historical belief systems.
- Concrete Forrest (2009). Concrete Forrest depicts a series of 36 busts in concrete rather than in porcelain, like in China China. Each bust has its own feature of vegetation from the local area surrounding Jingdezhen.
- Human, Human (2000). Human Human depicts a full body porcelain casting, featuring a woman with an almost scale-like green print across her body, with blooming flowers and plants travelling upwards from her feet to her head.
- China, China (1999). China China features a series of 40 hand painted porcelain busts, as well as several pairs of legs. Ah Xian used the faces of his family and friends to create the busts, and then employed local painters in Jingdezhen to paint the busts by hand. The porcelain busts feature muted expressions as well as traditional Chinese symbols, such as flowers and dragons.
- Evolutionaura (2013). Evolutionaura features a series of 8 busts, similar to Ah Xian's other art installations. In Evolutionaura, the busts are composed of metallic materials, such as bronze, and speckled in minerals from Lingbi County in Anhui, China.
- Naturephysica (2016). Similar to Metaphysica, Naturephysica features a series of busts with objects on the heads of the busts. However, Naturephysica differs from Metaphysica in that instead of featuring objects that reference Chinese mythology or belief systems, Naturephysica features more natural objects, such as plants and animals, on the tops of the heads of the busts.

== Other exhibitions ==
Ah Xian has held several other art installations aside from the ones mentioned above.

- Ah Xian, Herbert Gerisch-Stiftung, Neumünster, Germany (2009)
- Ah Xian, Gemeentemuseum, the Hague, the Netherlands (2008)
- Ah Xian, Queensland Art Gallery, Gallery of Modern Art, Brisbane (2003)
- The Art of Ah Xian, Asia Society Museum, New York, United States (2002)

== Group exhibitions ==
In addition to holding many of his own installations, Ah Xian has also participated in a series of group installations with other artists as well.

- In and Out of Context: Asia Society celebrates the Collections at 60, Asia Society, New York (2016)
- Dark Heart, 2014 Adelaide Biennial of Australian Art, Art Gallery of South Australia, Adelaide (2014)
- 4A A4 4A, 4A Centre for Contemporary Asian Art, Sydney (2013)
- Three Decades: The Contemporary Chinese Collection, Queensland Art Gallery, Gallery of Modern Art, Brisbane (1999)
- Above and Beyond: Austral/Asian Interactions, 1989, Australian Centre for Contemporary Art, Melbourne, (1996)
- Mao Goes Pop: China Post 1989, Museum of Contemporary Art Australia, Sydney, (1993)
- Chinese New Wave, CAST at Arthouse, Launceston, Victoria (1992)

== Awards and recognition ==
- In 2001, he won the National Gallery of Australia's inaugural National Sculpture Prize.
- In 2009, he won the final Clemenger Contemporary Art Award from the National Gallery of Victoria. He was awarded the prize of A$50,000 for his work, Concrete forest.
- In 2014 Ah Xian was included in the 2014 Art Gallery of South Australia: Dark Heart, curated by Nick Mitzevich, director of the Art Gallery of South Australia.
