= Stephen Wickham =

Australian photographer, painter and printmaker (born 1950)

Stephen Wickham (born 1950) is an Australian photographer, painter and printmaker.

== Biography ==
Stephen Wickham was born in 1950 in Melbourne. He studied at Prahran College of Advanced Education in 1972. In 1974 he was awarded a Diploma of Art from the National Gallery Art School of Victoria, then undertook a Graduate Diploma of Education at Melbourne University. He was granted a Masters of Arts (Visual Arts) from Monash University (Gippsland) in 1986.

Wickham has exhibited regularly since the 1980s and has received a number of major commissions for artworks from the Royal Automobile Club of Victoria (2013), the Victorian Tapestry Workshop (2007); the Department of Conservation, Lands & Environment for a poster series (1991); The Robert Holmes à Court Collection, Heytesbury Holdings, Perth, for photographs for Utopia, A Picture Story (1990). He is a member of the Print Council of Australia and was Vice President (1991–1995) of the Australian Print Workshop.

== Exhibitions ==
=== Solo ===
- 2017 Non-Objective: Painting, Deakin University Downtown Gallery. Victoria.
- 2013 Stephen Wickham @ Factory 49, Factory 49, Marrickville, New South Wales
- 2011 12 Snow as Ash: From Stefan to Georg Weisz, Exhibition Gallery, Deakin University, Victoria
- 2011 Dark Mantras as Dark Matter, Stephen McLaughlan Gallery, Melbourne, Victoria
- 2009 Peppie Vs Godzilla: Part Ι & II, Shell Regional Arts Program, Geelong Art Gallery, Victoria
- 2008 Dark Mantra, Stephen McLaughlan Gallery, Melbourne, Victoria
- 2007 Peppie Vs Godzilla, Stephen McLaughlan Gallery, Melbourne, Victoria
- 2004 Another Apocryphal History of Modernity, Stephen McLaughlan Gallery, Melbourne, Victoria
- 2004 ...from Stefan Weisz for Georg Weisz... Icon Museum of Art, Deakin University, Victoria
- 2001 ...from Stefan Weisz for Elizabeth, Emil, George Weisz, and Margaret Lasica... Stephen McLaughlan Gallery,
- 1999 Dark Mantras, Stephen McLaughlan Gallery, Melbourne, Victoria
- 1998 Arcadian Mists, Byron + Mapp Gallery, Sydney, New South Wales
- 1998 Whispers from The Hindu Love Gods, Stephen McLaughlan Gallery, Melbourne, Victoria
- 1997 Creatio ex Nihlo, Stephen McLaughlan Gallery, Melbourne, Victoria
- 1995 Recent Painting, Stephen McLaughlan Gallery, Melbourne, Victoria
- 1994 Works on Paper, William Mora Gallery, Richmond, Victoria
- 1994 Photographs, William Mora Gallery, Richmond, Victoria
- 1993 The Final Homage to Ivan Kljun and Meditations on the Thoughts of Francis Fukuyama, Powell Street Gallery,
- South Yarra, Victoria
- 1991 Photographs from Ubirr, Australian Centre for Photography, Paddington, New South Wales
- 1991 Photographs from Ubirr, (accompanying texts by Charles Green), William Mora Gallery, Richmond, Victoria
- 1990 Homage to Ivan Kljun, Powell Street Graphics, South Yarra, Victoria
- 1990 Selected Works on Paper, Monash University College, Gippsland, Victoria
- 1988 Arcadia Burning, William Mora Gallery, Richmond, Victoria
- 1988 From the Russian Suite, Powell Street Graphics, South Yarra, Victoria
- 1984 Winter at Mount Buffalo, Visibility Gallery, Melbourne, Victoria
- 1982 Sites for A Contemporary Ritual, Queensland College of Arts, Queensland

=== Group ===
- 2019 XXV + Celebrate. Stephen McLaughlan Gallery, Melbourne, Victoria.
- 2019 Annual group exhibition. Factory 49, Sydney, New South Wales.
- 2019 New Modern. RNOP Melbourne.
- 2019 The Road Paintings. 5 Walls Projects, Victoria.
- 2019 Sights Unseen. Moreland City Council art collection. Melbourne, Victoria.
- 2018 Beyond the Field (Still). Contemporary Art Tasmania.
- 2018 De Natured. Stephen McLaughlan Gallery, Melbourne, Victoria.
- 2018 '50 years after The Field". Factory 49, Sydney, New South Wales.
- 2018 LEGACY, Your collection. Our Story. Monash Gallery of Art, Victoria.
- 2018 Wyndham Art Prize. Wyndham City Art Gallery.
- 2018 #Abstraction 2018. Deakin University, Langford 120, Stephen McLaughlan Gallery, 5 Walls Projects, Victoria.
- 2018 Print Exhibition, Factory 49, Sydney, New South Wales.
- 2018 Edge. Langford 120, Melbourne, Victoria.
- 2017 The Void-Visible. Abstraction & Non-Objective Art. Deakin University Gallery. Victoria.
- 2017 Reductive-Non-Objective Private Gallery. Kiosk Show Katoomba Falls. NSW.
- 2017 VCA ART 150 Scholarship, Margaret Lawrence Gallery, VCA, Melbourne.
- 2017 Wyndham Art Prize. Wyndham City Art Gallery.
- 2017 Ad Hoc. Stephen McLaughlan Gallery, Melbourne, Victoria
- 2016-17 Visions of Utopia, Wollongong Art Gallery, Penrith art Centre.
- 2016 Nearly Monochrome, 5 Walls Projects, Footscray Victoria.
- 2016 0+1. Digital Prints, Stephen McLaughlan Gallery, Melbourne, Victoria
- 2016 Neo-0-10 #2. Stephen McLaughlan Gallery, Melbourne, Victoria
- 2016 Annual Group Exhibition, Factory 49, Sydney, New South Wales
- 2016 McClelland Collection, McClelland Gallery, Victoria
- 2016 Limited Edition, Burnie Regional Art Gallery
- 2015 Geelong Acquisitive Print Awards. Geelong Gallery
- 2015 Grid: Matrix Module Myth. Langford 120, Melbourne, Victoria.
- 2015 NEO-0-10 works on paper. McLaughlan Gallery, Melbourne, Victoria. 2015 Print Award. Geelong Gallery, Geelong, Victoria
- 2015 Fremantle Arts Centre Print Award. Fremantle Western Australia
- 2015 10th Annual Group Exhibition, Factory 49, Marrickville, New South Wales 2015 The Burnie Print Prize. Burnie Regional Art Gallery
- 2015 Digital Reductive. 5 Walls Projects, Footscray Victoria.
- 2014-2015 ELEMENTA. La Trobe regional Gallery and Gippsland Art Gallery Collection Exhibition. 2014 Gold Coast Art Prize 2014, The Art Centre Gold Coast, Queensland.
- 2014 Works on Paper 2014. Charles Nodrum Gallery, Melbourne, Victoria
- 2014 Abstraction 13, Charles Nodrum Gallery, Melbourne, Victoria
- 2014 Paper @ Factory 49. Factory 49, Sydney, New South Wales
- 2014 Annual Group Exhibition, Factory 49, Sydney, New South Wales
- 2014 National Works on Paper Awards. MPRG, Victoria
- 2014 Swan Hill Print and Drawing Award. Swan Hill Regional Art Gallery, Victoria
- 2014 Dark: More than Black. Stephen McLaughlan Gallery, Melbourne, Victoria
- 2013 14 SNO 100. SNO Contemporary Art Projects, Sydney, New South Wales
- 2013 14 Splash! From the Permanent Collections. New England Regional Art Museum, New South Wales
- 2013 Squaring up. Langford 120, 120 Langford Street, Melbourne, Victoria
- 2013 Black Echo, Stephen McLaughlan Gallery, Melbourne, Victoria
- 2013 Abstraction 12, Charles Nodrum Gallery, Melbourne, Victoria
- 2013 SNO 99, SNO Contemporary Art Projects, Sydney, New South Wales
- 2013 Factory 49 @ Stephen McLaughlan Gallery, Melbourne, Victoria
- 2013 Annual Group Exhibition, Factory 49, Sydney, New South Wales
- 2013 All breathing in heaven, Geelong Gallery, Geelong, Victoria
- 2013 2013 Geelong acquisitive print awards, Geelong Gallery, Geelong, Victoria
- 2012/13 Gold Coast Art Prize 2012, The Art Centre Gold Coast, Queensland
- 2012 Abstraction 11, Charles Nodrum Gallery, Melbourne, Victoria
- 2012 Geelong Contemporary Art Prize, Geelong Gallery, Geelong, Victoria
- 2012 Five decades of abstraction, Geelong Gallery, Geelong, Victoria
- 2012 Non-objective – present. Langford 120, 120 Langford Street, Melbourne, Victoria
- 2012 Recent Acquisitions, Burnie Regional Art Gallery, New South Wales
- 2011 and now, regarding that modernist remark abstraction, Stephen McLaughlan Gallery, Melbourne, Victoria
- 2011 My Australia, Kuandu Museum of Fine Arts, Taipei National University of the Arts, Taiwan
- 2011 Contemporary Landscapes, Colour Factory Gallery, Melbourne, Victoria
- 2011 Beyond Big Land, Geelong Gallery, Geelong, Victoria
- 2011 New Romantics, Gippsland Art Gallery, Victoria
- 2011 New Romantics, MARS Gallery, Melbourne, Victoria
- 2010/11 The Naked Face: Self-portraits, The Ian Potter Centre, National Gallery of Victoria, Victoria
- 2010/11 Beyond Big Land, Stephen McLaughlan Gallery, Melbourne, Victoria
- 2010 2010 Fletcher Jones Art Prize, Geelong Gallery, Victoria
- 2010 Contemporary woven tapestries from the Victorian Tapestry Workshop and ceramic work by members of Ceramics Victoria, Walker Street Gallery, Dandenong, Victoria
- 2010 52 — a print exchange portfolio, Shell Regional Arts Program, Geelong Gallery, Victoria
- 2009 QUIET!, Stephen McLaughlan Gallery, Melbourne, Victoria
- 2009 2009 Geelong Acquisitive Print Awards, Geelong Gallery, Victoria
- 2009 Contemporary Woven Tapestries, Central Goldfields Art Gallery, Victoria
- 2009 Abstraction 2009, Stephen McLaughlan Gallery, Melbourne, Victoria
- 2008 Small Tapestries: 2009 Collection, Victorian Tapestry Workshop, Melbourne, Victoria
- 2008 Bias Bound, Victorian Tapestry Workshop, Stephen Mc Laughlan Gallery, Melbourne, Victoria
- 2008 Salon 2008: Photographic, Stephen Mc Laughlan Gallery, Melbourne, Victoria
- 2008 von Guerard to von Stumer — aspect of a collection, Geelong Gallery, Victoria
- 2007 Stephen Mc Laughlan at FOURTYFIVEDOWNSTAIRS, FOURTYFIVEDOWNSTAIRS, Melbourne, Victoria
- 2007 Sci-Fi 2007, Stephen McLaughlan Gallery, Melbourne, Victoria
- 2006 Twelfth Anniversary Exhibition, Stephen McLaughlan Gallery, Melbourne, Victoria
- 2006 John Leslie Art Prize 2006, Gippsland Art Gallery, Sale, Victoria
- 2006 White mantle: the winter landscape in Australian art, Geelong Gallery, Victoria
- 2006 Sylvan Shades, Stephen McLaughlan Gallery, Melbourne, Victoria
- 2006 Swan Hill Print & Drawing Prize, Swan Hill Art Gallery, Victoria
- 2005 bestiary, Stephen McLaughlan Gallery, Melbourne, Victoria
- 2004 Imagining the Future, Lab 3000 Digital Design Biennale 2004, Melbourne Museum, Victoria
- 2004 Between Three Silences, Ord Minnett Foyer Gallery, Melbourne, Victoria
- 2004 Robert Jacks Drawing Prize, Bendigo Art Gallery, Victoria
- 2004 Print & Drawing Acquisitive Awards, Swan Hill Regional Art Gallery, Victoria
- 2004 A Humble Gesture, Stephen McLaughlan Gallery, Melbourne, Victoria
- 2003 Robert Jacks Drawing Prize, Bendigo Art Gallery, Victoria
- 2004 City of Banyule Works on Paper Art Award, City of Banyule, Ivanhoe, Victoria
- 2004 Darebin–La Trobe Acquisitive Art Prize, Bundoora Homestead Art Centre & La Trobe University Museum of
- Art, Bundoora, Victoria
- 2004 National Photographic Purchase Award, Albury Regional Art Gallery, Victoria
- 2004 National Works on Paper, Mornington Peninsula Regional Gallery, Victoria
- 2004 Sleeps with Angels — Sex & Death, Stephen McLaughlan Gallery, Melbourne, Victoria
- 2004 Summer Salon, Centre for Contemporary Photography, Melbourne, Victoria
- 2002 Figure Out, Mass Gallery, Melbourne, Victoria
- 2002 2002 Nikon Summer Salon, Centre for Contemporary Photography, Melbourne, Victoria
- 2002 Abstract Painting — Salon 2002, Stephen McLaughlan Gallery, Melbourne, Victoria
- 2001 The Eighteenth McGregor Prize for Photography, University of Southern Queensland, Queensland
- 2001 Nikon Summer Salon, Centre for Contemporary Photography, Melbourne, Victoria
- 2001 Summer Stock, Stephen McLaughlan Gallery, Melbourne, Victoria
- 2000 Gallery Artists, Byron + Mapp Gallery, Sydney, New South Wales
- 2000 National Works on Paper, Mornington Peninsula Art Centre, Victoria
- 2000 Some Photographs, Stephen McLaughlan Gallery, Melbourne, Victoria
- 1999 Christmas Show, Australian Galleries, Works on Paper Gallery, Sydney, New South Wales 1999 7th International Works on Paper Fair, Sydney, New South Wales
- 1999 4th Anniversary Exhibition, Byron + Mapp, Sydney, New South Wales
- 1999 Contemporary Australian Works on Paper presented by Australian Galleries, Smith & Stoneley, Queensland
- 1999 Contemporary Australian Works on Paper, Australian Galleries, Works on Paper Gallery, Sydney, New South Wales
- 1999 Visy Board Art Prize, Barossa Valley, South Australia
- 1999 Selected Works from Goddard de Fiddes Gallery Perth, Stephen McLaughlan Gallery, Melbourne, Victoria
- 1999 Summer Salon 1999, Centre for Contemporary Photography, Melbourne, Victoria
- 1998 Double Dialogues, Deakin University Theatreworks, Victoria
- 1998 Selected Works on Paper, Australian Galleries, Works on Paper Gallery, Sydney, New South Wales
- 1998 Geelong Contemporary Art Prize, Geelong Gallery, Victoria
- 1998 Works on Paper, 1998, Stephen McLaughlan, Melbourne, Victoria
- 1998 National Works on Paper, Mornington Peninsula Regional Gallery, Victoria
- 1998 13 Artists Recent Works on Paper, Australian Galleries, Sydney, New South Wales
- 1998 Pictures from the Collection, Byron + Mapp Gallery, Sydney, New South Wales
- 1998 9 x 5 by Twenty-Five, George Adams Gallery, Melbourne, Victoria
- 1998 Summer Stock, Stephen McLaughlan Gallery, Melbourne, Victoria
- 1998 Summer Salon 1998, Centre for Contemporary Photography, Melbourne, Victoria
- 1997 13th Biennial Spring Festival of Drawing, Mornington Peninsula Regional Gallery, Victoria
- 1997 2D/3D, Artis Gallery, Auckland, New Zealand
- 1996/97 Non- Objective Presence, Australian Galleries, Sydney, New South Wales & Melbourne, Victoria
- 1996 Two Australian Painters: Allan Mitelman and Stephen Wickham, Artis Gallery, Auckland, New Zealand
- 1996 The XLR8 Summer Salon 1996, Centre for Contemporary Photography, Melbourne, Victoria
- 1995 The Situation Now: A Survey of Local Non-Objective Art, La Trobe University Art Museum, Victoria
- 1995 9x5 Exhibition, Anti-Grand Prix Exhibition, Robert Lindsay Gallery, Melbourne, Victoria
- 1995 Staff Exhibition, Victorian College of the Arts Gallery, Melbourne, Victoria
- 1995 Out of Stock, Artis Gallery, Auckland, New Zealand
- 1995 The 1995 Postcard Show, Linden Gallery, St Kilda, Victoria
- 1994 No-Name Big Little Picture Show, Centre for Contemporary Photography, Melbourne, Victoria
- 1994 Arts Works 6, Gallery 101 Collins Street, Melbourne, Victoria
- 1994 Silent Objects: Non-Objective Art from Melbourne, Centre for Contemporary Art, Hamilton and Artis Gallery, Auckland, New Zealand
- 1994 Bezalel Arts, Caulfield Arts Complex, Victoria
- 1994 Recent Acquisitions, McClelland Gallery, Langwarrin, Victoria
- 1993 An Exhibition of Contemporary Jewish Art, Westpac Gallery, Melbourne, Victoria
- 1992 PaperWorks 3 — Scotland, Seagate Gallery, Dundee, UK
- 1992 Then ... and Now, Box Hill Community Arts Centre, Box Hill, Victoria
- 1992 Melbourne Art, Melbourne Artists, Melbourne Savage Club Invitation Art Prize, McClelland Gallery, Langwarrin, Victoria
- 1990 A.Z. Gallery, Tokyo, Japan
- 1990 It All Starts Here, Powell Street Gallery, South Yarra, Victoria
- 1989 Henri Worland Memorial Print Award, Warrnambool Arts Centre, Victoria
- 1988 8th Print Biennale, Mornington Peninsula Arts Centre, Victoria
- 1987 Australian Contemporary Photographers, National Gallery of Victoria, Melbourne, Victoria 1987 Six Victorian Artists, Albury Regional Art Gallery, Victoria
- 1987 A Group Show, Print Council of Australia, North Melbourne, Victoria
- 1987 Henri Worland Memorial Print Award, Warrnambool Arts Centre, Victoria
- 1986 Australian Landscape Photographed, National Gallery of Victoria, Melbourne, Victoria 1987 Invitation Print Exhibition, Reconnaissance, Melbourne, Victoria
- 1987 Six Victorian Printmakers, Darling Downs Institute of Advanced Education, Queensland
- 1987 7th Print Biennale, Mornington Peninsula Arts Centre, Victoria
- 1987 Members Prints, Print Council of Australia, North Melbourne, Victoria
- 1987 Prints To Cuba, Australian Artists Exchange to Cuba, Cuba, United States of America
- 1985 Proofs Exhibition, McClelland Gallery, Langwarrin, Victoria
- 1985 Exchange Exhibition USA, Print Council of Australia, North Melbourne, Victoria
- 1984 Emerging Victorian Printmakers, Mitchelton Exhibition, La Trobe University Gallery & Benalla Art Gallery
- 1984 Sculptors As Craftsmen, Meat Market Craft Centre, Melbourne, Victoria
- 1984 6th Print Biennale, Mornington Peninsula Arts Centre, Victoria
- 1983 Proof Exhibition, Victorian Print Workshop, Fitzroy, Victoria
- 1982 Landscape Australia, National Gallery of Vi== Department ==of Photography, Victoria
- 1980 Forty Australian Artists, Adelaide Festival of Arts, South Australia
- 1980 Air Show, Contemporary Art Space, Adelaide, South Australia
- 1979 Selected Works from The Mitchell Endowment, National Gallery of Victoria, Melbourne, Victoria
- 1975 Recent Acquisitions, National Gallery of Victoria, Department of Photography, Melbourne, Victoria

== Collections ==
- 2018 Penrith Regional Gallery, Home of The Lewers Bequest. Paintings.
- 2018 Wollongong Art Gallery. Painting.
- 2018 Penrith Regional Gallery, Home of The Lewers Bequest. Paintings.
- 2018 Wollongong Art Gallery. Painting.
- 2017 Deakin University. Painting.
- 2017 State of Library of Victoria, Photographs, lithographs.
- 2016 Deakin University, Works on paper.
- 2016 Deakin University, Photographs.
- 2015 RACV Collection. Photographs.
- 2014 Geelong Gallery. Painting.
- 2014 MAMA. Murray Art Museum Albury. Photographs.
- 2014 Counihan Gallery, Brunswick. Silver Prints.
- 2013 Deakin University, Painting
- 2012 La Trobe Regional Gallery. Colour Photographs.
- 2011 The Arts Centre Gold Coast. Painting and photographs.
- 2010 Burnie Regional Art Gallery Print Collection, Dry point Etching.
- 2009 The Peter Mac Art Collection, Painting installation.
- 2009 Warrnambool Art Gallery, Multi-coloured lithograph and etchings.
- 2008 Australian Embassy Washington DC, Colour photographs.
- 2008 McClelland Gallery, Suite of drawings.
- 2005 Deakin University, Colour photographs.
- 2004 Monash Gallery of Art, Colour photographs.
- 2003 National Gallery of Australia, Lithographs.
- 2003 Australia Print Workshop Archive 2, Lithographs.
- 2003 Works on paper New England Regional Art Museum. Works on paper.
- 2001 Geelong Gallery, Works on paper.
- 2001 Ballarat Fine Art Gallery, Photographs.
- 2001 State of Library of Victoria, Colour photographs.
- 1998 Museum of Modern Art at Heide, Lithographs.
- 1998 National Library of Australia, Photographs.
- 1998 Art Bank, Paintings.
- 1996 National Gallery of Australia, Multi-coloured lithographs.
- 1995 University of Melbourne Art Collection, Etchings.
- 1995 New England Regional Art Museum. Works on paper.
- 1995 McClelland Gallery, Etchings.
- 1994 State Library of Victoria Picture Collection, Ciba-chrome prints.
- 1994 Council of Adult Education, Melbourne, Multi-coloured lithograph.
- 1994 McClelland Gallery, Etchings.
- 1993 Benalla Regional Art Gallery, Etchings and SX-70 polaroids.
- 1993 National Gallery of Victoria, Etchings.
- 1993 McClelland Gallery, Suite of drawings.
- 1993 State Library of Victoria Picture Collection, Silver prints, polaroids and assemblages.
- 1993 Horsham Regional Art Centre, Silver prints.
- 1993 Camberwell Grammar Art Collection, Drawing
- 1990 Victorian College of the Arts Collection, Lithographs
- 1989 State Library of Victoria Picture Collection, Ciba-chrome photographs & silver prints
- 1988 Overseas Telecommunications Corporation, Lithographs.
- 1987 Art Bank, Etchings.
- 1987 National Gallery of Victoria, Department of Photography, Ciba-chrome photographs.
- 1987 Victorian Print Workshop, Etchings.
- 1986 Art Bank, Lithographs.
- 1986 City of Waverley Collection, Etchings.
- 1986 Commission for The Future, Lithographs.
- 1986 Print Council of Australia, Member print.
- 1985 City of Box Hill Art Collection, Lithograph.
- 1984 Albury Regional Art Gallery, Silver prints.
- 1984 City of Box Hill Art Collection, Silver prints.
- 1984 Box Hill College of TAFE, Silver prints.
- 1983 National Gallery of Victoria, Department of Photography, Silver prints.
- 1983 Victorian Print Workshop, Lithographs.
- 1982 National Gallery of Victoria, Department of Photography, Kodak instant photographs.
- 1978 National Gallery of Victoria, Michelle Endowment, Painting.

== Awards ==
- 1975 National Gallery of Victoria, Department of Photography, Silver prints.
- 2007 Artist in Residence, Victorian Tapestry Workshop, Melbourne, Victoria
- 1996 Landscape Photography Prize, Centre for Contemporary Photography Summer Salon, Melbourne, Victoria
- 1974 Hugh Ramsay Drawing Prize, National Gallery School, Melbourne, Victoria
- 1974 Special Jury Prize for Portraiture, Trustees of the National Gallery of Victoria, Melbourne, Victoria

== Publications ==
- Green, C. & Wickham, S.,"Abstract", West, Dr. Rex Butler (Editor), 1991
- Heathcote, C. R.; Willis, Leanne; Wickham, Stephen (2017), The Void. Visible: Abstraction and Non-Objective Art, Deakin University - Art Gallery, ISBN 978-0-9944025-9-2
- Wickham, Stephen; Icon Museum of Art (2004), Stephen Wickham: "... from Stefan Weisz for Georg Weisz ...", Icon Museum of Art, Deakin University, ISBN 978-0-7300-2615-0

== Bibliography ==
- Allen, C., 'Face Facts', The Australian, 8 January 2011
- Allen, C., 'Memories, references and conceits', Australian Art Monthly, March 1997
- Backhouse, M., 'Art Galleries', The Age, 29 April 2006
- Beaumont, L., 'Uncommon threads' The Age A2, 9 August 2008
- Bellamy, L., 'Artist's four-legged muse', The Age Metro, 11 April 2005
- Boddington, Jennie (1985), Australian landscape photographed: an exhibition of photographs from the collection of the National Gallery of Victoria, National Gallery of Victoria
- Boddington, Jennie (1987), Australian contemporary photographers: John Anthong Delacour, Peter Elliston, Jillian Gibb, Ruth Maddison, David Stephenson and Stephen Wickham, National Gallery of Victoria
- Boddington, J., Winter At Mount Buffalo, Catalogue Essay, Visibility Gallery, 1984
- Brody, Annemarie; Gooch, Rodney (1990), Utopia: a picture story: 88 silk batiks from the Robert Holmes a Court Collection, Heytesbury Holdings for the Robert Holmes a Court Collection, ISBN 978-0-646-00909-4
- Crombie, Isobel; Byron, Sandra (1990), Twenty contemporary Australian photographers: from the Hallmark Cards Australian Photographic Collection, National Gallery of Victoria, ISBN 978-0-7241-0142-9
- Catalano, G., 'Moves To The Periphery Of Taste', The Age, 27 April 1990
- Catalano, G., 'Review', The Age, 3 August 1988
- Cawthorne, Z., 'Purple Patch', Herald Sun, 8 February 1997
- Crawford, A., 'Between Three Silences', The Sunday Age, 31 October 2004
- Faust, B., 'Landscape Art Flourishes In The Wilderness', The Age, 20 June 1984
- Faust, B., 'Wit, Mystery And Magic', The Age, 24 June 1987
- Gaston, Vivien Margaret; Gaston, Vivien Margaret (2010), The naked face: self-portraits (1st ed.), National Gallery of Victoria, ISBN 978-0-7241-0334-8
- Grishin, Sasha (2013), Accounting for taste: the Lowensteins Arts Management Collection, Macmillan Art Publishing, ISBN 978-1-921394-80-5
- Green, Charles (1988), "Seduction in the landscape. [Artistic works by John Wolseley and Stephen Wickham]", Art and Australia, 26 (2): 290–295, ISSN 0004-301X
- Gregg, S., New Romantics: Darkness and Light in Australian Art, Australian Scholarly Publishing, 2011
- Hanson, D., 'Out there, Man', The Age, 9 March 2007
- Harper, J., 'Gallery Godzilla', The Geelong Advertiser, 3 February 2009
- Harris, R., 'Photos Developing as Collectibles', The Age, 27 November 1995
- Wickham, Stephen (2004), Stephen Wickham: "... from Stefan Weisz for Georg Weisz ...", Icon Museum of Art, Deakin University, ISBN 978-0-7300-2615-0
- 2000 national works on paper: Mornington Peninsula Regional Gallery 6 August - 24 September 2000, Mornington Peninsula Regional Gallery, 2000, ISBN 978-0-9585894-5-1
- Heathcote, C., 'A Fresh Direction', Art Monthly, March 1993
- Heathcote, C., 'A Show at the Cutting Edge', The Age, 1 July 1992
- Heathcote, C., 'Audacious Works are a Fine Farewell to Powell Street Gallery', The Age, 24 March 1993
- Heathcote, C., 'Australian artists and environmental awareness', Australian Art Monthly, no. 125 November 1999
- Heathcote, C., 'Following a Bright Vanguard', The Age, 26 October 1994
- Heathcote, C., 'from Stefan Weisz for Elizabeth, Emil, Georg Weisz and Margaret Lasica....', Artlink, vol. 20 no. 3, September 201
- Heathcote, C., 'Imagined Worlds Provide the Inspiration for a New Movement', The Age, 9 December 1992
- Heathcote, C., 'New Abstract Works from Rival Traditions', The Age, 5 August 1992
- Heathcote, C., 'Mankind, Morality and What it's all About', The Age, 20 July 1994
- Heathcote, C., 'Margaret Stewart Endowment Part 2', The Age, 2 July 1993
- Heathcote, C., 'Rumours Meet Their Match', The Age, 8 June 1994
- Heathcote, Christopher (1995), The situation now: a survey of local non-objective art, La Trobe University Art Museum
- Heathcote, C., 'When Antonioni Met Rothko', Quadrant, January–February 2012
- Hemensley, C., 'Everything and Nothing', Photofile, Spring 1984
- Kempson, R., 'The born-again Antipodeans', Art Monthly (letters to editor), April 1997
- An Exhibition of contemporary art by Jewish artists in Australia, 4 March - 27 March 1993, The Jewish Festival of the Arts, 1993
- Makin, J., 'Critic's Choice', Herald Sun, 11 June 2007
- Christofides, Andrew; McGillick, Paul (2016), Visions of Utopia, Wollongong Wollongong Art Gallery, ISBN 978-0-9758372-8-3
- McLeod, D. & Karoich, S., Emerging Victorian Printmakers, Catalogue Essay, Mitchelton Exhibition, La Trobe University Gallery & Benalla Art Gallery, 1984
- Mitchelton print exhibition, [Mitchelton print exhibition: Australian Gallery File]
- Modra, P., 'Peppie Vs Godzilla Part I & 2', The Sunday Age, February 2009
- McCulloch, Alan; McCulloch, Susan; McCulloch Childs, Emily (2006), The new McCulloch's encyclopedia of Australian art (4th ed.), AUS Art Editions; The Miegunyah Press, ISBN 978-0-522-85317-9
- McNamara T. J., 'Diffidence from across the ditch', New Zealand Herald, 10 October 1996
- McNamara, T. J., 'Perspective on Art', New Zealand Herald, September 1994
- Nelson, R., 'Nostalgic journey through the landscape', The Age, 16 June 2001
- Reynolds, R., 'Abstract work enthuses buffs', Geelong Advertiser, 28 July 2010
- Rooney, R. 'Borgelt', The Australian, February 1997
- Rooney, R., 'Fullbrook, Thomas, Wickham', The Australian, 23 June 1995
- Smee, S., 'Abstract: alive and cliquing', Sydney Morning Herald, December 1996
- Smith, Bernard; Heathcote, Christopher; Smith, Terry (2001), Australian painting, 1788-2000 (4th ed.), Oxford University Press, ISBN 978-0-19-551554-1
- Smee, S., 'Abstract: alive and cliquing', Sydney Morning Herald, December 1996
- Strong, G., 'A Balanced View of Landscape', The Age, 17 February 1982
- Verbeek, Ann (1988), Directory 1988: Australian artists producing prints, Print Council of Australia, ISBN 978-0-909227-11-1
- Deakin University (2017), Deakin University Art Collection: A Selection of Works, Deakin University, ISBN 978-0-9944025-6-1
- Webb, P., 'Art that multiplies rather than abstracts', The Age, 19 February 1999
- Webb, P., 'Box Office, Visual Arts,' The Age 'Melbourne Magazine', September 2009
- Webb, P., 'Patterns of control and chance', The Age, 21 May 2008
- Webb, P., 'Visual Arts', The Sunday Age: Preview, 13 May 2007
- Young, Michael (1984), Sculptors as craftsmen, Meat Market Craft Centre, ISBN 978-0-7241-5644-3
- Zimmer, J., 'The wonderful resilience of the non-objective ideal', Art Monthly, May 1997
