= Clemenger Contemporary Art Award =

Invitational art prize

The Clemenger Contemporary Art Award, also referred to as the Clemenger Award, was a major, triennial, invitational art prize organised under the auspices of the National Gallery of Victoria and funded by the philanthropists Joan and Peter Clemenger. The Clemengers' gift was made in 1991 and the first award was made in 1993. The final award was made in 2009, after which the award ended.

The award was based upon an artist's corpus of work and not upon a particular piece. The value of each prize varied, with the final, 2009 award being worth A$50,000.

== Complete List of Winners ==
- 1993 (inaugural) - Bea Maddock
- 1996 - Richard Larter
- 1999 - John Nixon
- 2003 - John Mawurndjul
- 2006 - Judy Watson
- 2009 (final) - Ah Xian
