= John Clemenger =

Australian rules footballer

Personal information
- Full name: John Henry Clemenger
- Born: 6 August 1891; Clifton Hill, Victoria
- Died: 19 July 1941 (aged 49); Elwood, Victoria
- Original team: Elsternwick
- Height: 173 cm (5 ft 8 in)
- Weight: 68 kg (150 lb)

Playing career^{1}
Years	Club	Games (Goals)
1919–21	Geelong	20 (16)
- ^{1} Playing statistics correct to the end of 1921.

John Henry Clemenger (6 August 1891 – 19 July 1941) was an Australian rules footballer who played with Geelong in the Victorian Football League (VFL).
