= Virginia Coventry =

Australian photographer (born 1942)

Virginia Coventry (born 1942) is an Australian photographer. Her photography includes pictures of environmental protests, such as the nuclear power industry and also of land usage in Australia. She is also credited as the main editor for "Critical Distance: Work with Photography/Politics/Writing".

== Early life and education ==
Coventry studied painting from 1960 to 1968. From 1960 to 1964 she studied at the Royal Melbourne Institute of Technology (RMIT), then finished her post-graduate studies at the Slade School of Fine Art in London in 1968.

== Career and projects ==
In the 40 years of Coventry's career, her work contains consistent themes, and her exploration on factors of art, such as space and colouring, with the use of different artistic mediums such as paintings, collages, drawings and photography.

The themes of her works would be evoking ideas based on our private expression, through the use of abstraction. Colouring wise, Coventry uses the term "acoustic" from music and bonds the concept of colouring in paintings, this is done to visualise pitches, keys and tones.

Coventry's exploration of space can be evidently seen on her photography and painting projects in the 1970s. In order to create a sense of physical reality and to emphasise character by the use of composition for her photography projects, the size of the installation is proportionally huge.

As for her abstract paintings, she uses huge installations in order to enhance how a person would view spacing, lighting and colouring of the paintings.

=== Here and There: Concerning the Nuclear Power Industry (1977–1978) ===
Here and There: Concerning the Nuclear Power Industry is a wall panel display which included photocopies of newspaper clippings, photographs printed on gelatin silver materials and notes written in both pencil and fibre tipped pen.

The size of the wall panel is about the average person height, which was about four meters long. This was done by Coventry in order for the texts that has been written, can be read by the audience. The criteria for the photographs that were featured in the wall panel, were documentary type photographs, which is the reason why most of the photographs were plain and are classified as "what could be seen from outside the fence". The environmental message that Coventry wanted to avoid, would be the typical "hippy-ish" good vs bad, by having contrast of both beautiful nature and devastating technology.

In order to avoid this, Coventry uses photos that have been published previously, through pre-existing photographs, it creates a sense that it is the reality that they are currently living in, which makes the message all the more significant as they have already experienced and relate with it.

Additionally, what makes the artwork unique is Coventry's contribution to the artwork itself, as it is composed of mostly photographs from other people, and she only compiled and edited it to a physical medium to be presented to an audience. It consisted of newspaper clippings, photographs of nuclear power plants and handwritten text. The handwritten texts that are found next to various newspaper clippings are written by Coventry. These writings contradict the statements written by the various newspaper writers, this is done by Coventry to create a juxtaposition effect. It was purchased in 1980.

=== Whyalla - Not a Document (1977–1981) ===
Whyalla - Not a Document is a seven-part installation, that are supported on cardboard panels, perspex frame and the photographs are printed on silver gelatin process. It features photographs by Coventry, the concept of the photographs revolves about how people would perceive landscape, through the demonstration of the corruption of a land through panoramic photos. The criticism of the damage to the landscape, would be the misusage of the land by major industries, and also how it affects the surrounding areas by formations that take place on the land based on the consequence of industrial activities. The term "Not a document" in the title, is used to refer that the photographs shown are not mere representation, but as "facts". This is Coventry's attempt at exploring the idea of how photographs represent the issue that it's trying to document. It was purchased in 1984.

=== Critical Distance: Work with Photography/Politics/Writing ===
Critical Distance: Work with Photography/Politics/Writing is a collection of photography projects concerning environmental and political issues on Australia. The title, "Critical Distance", refers to the relationship of the viewers and the photographs of the project (Distance) and also the accuracy of analysis and judgement based on the issues discussed (Critical). Coventry's project on "Here and There: Concerning the Nuclear Power Industry" is featured in the book, along with a fully detailed view of the display. The book was briefly mentioned in Anne-Marie Willis's book on "Picturing Australia : A History of Photography", as she was discussing fine art photography, she talked about the potential of photography and how it has become a "self-conscious activity" as an art form. Some books including "Working Papers on Photography" and "Halide", was described by her as an important and famous examples when it comes to debating the themes of photography in the past years (during the 1980s).

== Awards and recognitions ==
Over the years, Coventry's work has been exhibited in many public and private collections, as well as public museums. Her works are not only presented in Australia but also in England, North America, and New Zealand (Liverpool Street Gallery, New England Regional Art Museum and Center for Contemporary Art, respectively). In Australia alone, she has been featured in galleries and universities from 1978 up until 2009, such as the Australian National University, Tin Sheds Gallery (Faculty of Architecture Design and Planning), University of Sydney, Art Gallery of New South Wales, National Gallery of Victoria (Melbourne), Monash University, Museum of Art Melbourne, Ian Potter Museum of Art, Art Gallery of New South Wales, Watters Gallery, Experimental Art Foundation (Adelaide), and Institute of Modern Art (Brisbane).

The Cité internationale des arts Paris Studio was awarded to Virginia Coventry at 1999 and one of the finalists of the Sulman Prize for three different years (2004, 2008 and 2009), both given by the Art Gallery of New South Wales.
