= Richard Larter =

Australian artist (1929–2014)

- Born: 19 May 1929; London, England, United Kingdom
- Died: 25 July 2014 (aged 85); Canberra, Australia
- Known for: Painting, Drawing
- Awards: Clemenger Contemporary Art Award, 1995

Richard Larter (19 May 1929 – 25 July 2014) was an Australian painter, often identified as one of Australia's few highly recognisable pop artists. Larter also frequently painted in a Pointillist style. He took advantage of unusual techniques with painting: using a syringe filled with paint to create his early works, and juxtaposing multiple images on to a canvas. Many of his works are brightly coloured and draw on popular culture for source materials, reproducing news photographs, film stills, and images from pornography. He was married to Pat Larter, an artist who was involved in the Mail art movement, then performance art and finally painting in a brightly coloured style similar to Richard's. The Larters emigrated to Australia in 1962. Richard Larter's pop art was less ironic than his American and English counterparts. In this Larter is similar to other noted Australian pop artists, such as, Mike Brown and Martin Sharp.

== Exhibitions ==
Larter was exhibited consistently from 1965 on across Australia, including as the subject of over 60 solo shows, most often at Niagara Galleries, Melbourne, and Watters Gallery, Sydney, and over 100 group shows spanning almost 50 years. Notable exhibitions include his 2002 show Stripperama: Richard Larter at the Heide Museum of Modern Art and the show Andy and Oz: parallel visions organised by the National Gallery of Australia (NGA), and exhibited at The Andy Warhol Museum, Pittsburgh, US, in 2007.

Larter was honoured with a retrospective of his work at the NGA in 2008, the exhibition revealing him continuing to be a leading Australian contemporary artist.

== Collections ==
Larter is represented in the collections of major galleries, such as the National Gallery of Australia, National Gallery of Victoria, Art Gallery of New South Wales, Art Gallery of South Australia, Art Gallery of Western Australia and Ballarat Fine Art Gallery, as well as numerous state, regional, university and private collections throughout Australia.

== Death ==
He died in Canberra on 25 July 2014.

== Awards and honors ==
- Berrima Prize – 1965
- Muswellbrook Art Prize – 1966
- Perth Prize for Drawing, Art Gallery of Western Australia – 1967
- Queensland Art Gallery Trustee Prize – 1976
- Broken Hill Centenary Art Acquisitive Prize – 1983
- Clemenger Contemporary Art Award, National Gallery of Victoria – 1996

=== See also ===
Australian art
