= Burnie Print Prize =

Australian art award

The Burnie Print Prize is a biannual acquisitive art competition developed by the Burnie Regional Art Gallery, and held in Burnie, Tasmania, Australia. Established in 2007, it showcases the best works from Australian print makers, and aims to develop the gallery's print collection, focusing on printmaking, techniques in relief printing, intaglio printing, planographic printing, and stencil printing.

The total prize pool is A$23,000, with the main winner receiving $17,000, an emerging artist prize of $5,000, and a $1,000 People's Choice Award. Artists can enter works that have been completed in the two years prior to the event. The shortlisted entries are displayed in the accompanying Burnie Print Prize exhibition.

== Selected winners ==
- 2007 – Belinda Fox
- 2011 – David Frazer
- 2015 – Neil Malone
- 2017 – David Frazer and Patricia Wilson-Adams
- 2019 – Rew Hanks for Gone fishing east of Faskrudsfjordur
- 2021 – Annika Romeyn for Guerilla Bay 3
- 2023 – Niloufar Lovegrove for Glorious Peace
- 2024 – Sally Baldwin for After the bushfires – Regeneration
- 2025 – Lois Waters for Pleat 4
