= Watters Gallery =

Art gallery in Sydney, Australia

Coordinates: 33.8753°S 151.2150°E

Watters Gallery (1964–2018) was a private art gallery in Riley Street Sydney, Australia, run by Frank Watters (1934 – May 2020) with his business partners and friends Geoffrey Legge (1935-1925) and Alex Legge. It was influential and well-known, hosting exhibitions and works by some of the most prominent non-mainstream artists in Australia of the 20th and 21st centuries, including Tony Tuckson, James Gleeson, Richard Larter, Robert Klippel, and Garry Shead.

== History ==
The gallery was opened on 18 November 1964 in Liverpool Street in Darlinghurst by former coal miner, Frank Watters. As a gay man in an era when coming out of the closet was dangerous, Watters had painted a picture titled He's a Queer!, but never shown it in the gallery, keeping it turned to the wall in his bedroom instead. He painted very little after that one, because it scared him.

The gallery moved in 1969 to a former pub in Riley Street, in the heart of what was then the red light district, that was built in the 1850s.

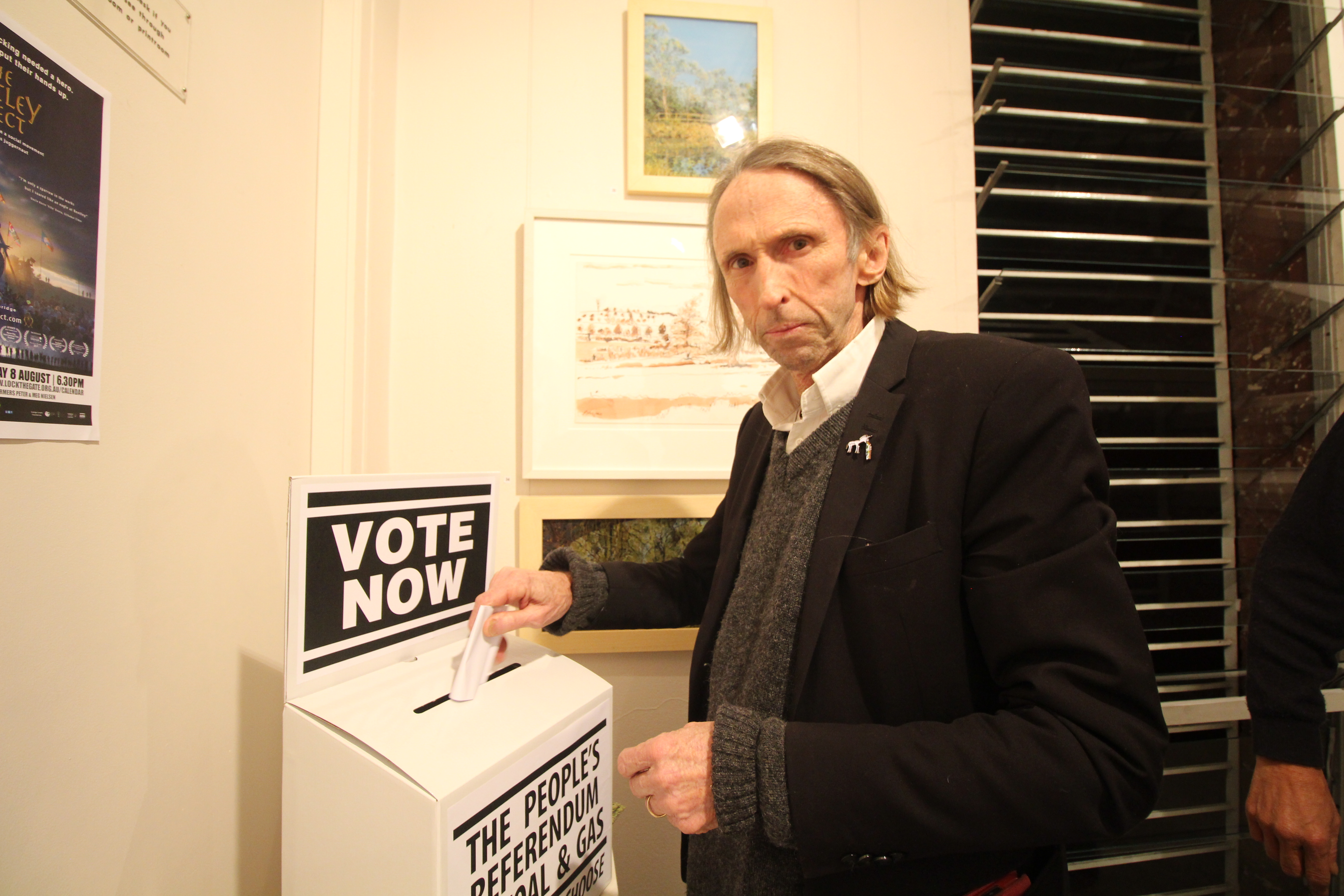
Reg Mombassa casts his vote at the opening night of Watters Gallery Exhibition for Hume Coal, July 2017

It was among the first Sydney galleries to show avant-garde sculpture, including that of Bob Klippel, and allowed artists to choose what works to put on show. This was a point of difference from many other galleries. John Peart's work was also exhibited at Watters, from when he first arrived in Sydney from Brisbane as a teenager, to the end of his career. The gallery supported him through a radical change of direction in style, even when art investors did not.

The gallery also represented Marr Grounds, co-founder of the Tin Sheds in Sydney, whose first solo exhibition, Morphological structures, was held at Watters in 1975. He said that he was "treated fantastically" by Watters. Watters also sold works by Imants Tillers and Aleks Danko.

Artist Tony Tuckson, formerly a Spitfire pilot and later deputy director of the Art Gallery of NSW (AGNSW), was a great champion of the gallery, and the final exhibition there was dedicated to his work.

Watters Gallery finally closed its doors on 24 November 2018, after 54 years, with Frank Watters' collection of around 150 paintings and sculptures to be auctioned by Shapiro Auctioneers in 2019.

Frank Watters died in May 2020. Geoffrey Legge died in 2025.

== Recognition and legacy ==
For its 50th anniversary, an exhibition was held at the S. H. Ervin Gallery in Sydney, entitled Five Decades at Watters Gallery. Presentations and discussions were held by Watters Gallery artists Euan Macleod, Reg Mombassa (aka Chris O'Doherty), Ann Thomson, Joe Frost, as well as curator and art writer Glenn Barkley, and Sonia Legge, who discussed the future of the gallery.

Before the gallery closed, Watters offered two senior curators from AGNSW to pick any works from his collection that they wanted. They chose 32 works, collectively valued at over A$1m, including a huge painting by Richard Larter of his wife Pat Larter with her genitalia expose, called Five in a Row Show. He also donated his archive to the AGNSW Library.

An exhibition at University of Technology Sydney Gallery, entitled The Watters' Gift was held from 20 May to 17 July 2020), recognising Watters' legacy, after he had donated 67 works by 27 Australian artists to the university, which was most significant gift in its history.

The legacy of Watters Gallery also included the support of the establishment of the Legge Gallery in 1990 in Redfern which was run by Legge's son Jasper Legge and daughter Zoe Legge. The gallery exhibited a range of artists until 2009.
