= Aleks Danko =

Aleks Danko (born 1950) is an Australian performance artist and sculptor. The son of Ukrainian migrants, he was born in Adelaide, and educated at the South Australian School of Art (University of South Australia) and the Hawthorn Institute of Education.

He started exhibiting in Adelaide in 1970. The first exhibition at Llewellyn Galleries, Adelaide was titled UCK, a collaboration with the poet and artist Richard Tipping. Since then he has held over 45 solo exhibitions and his work has been selected for a number of national and international exhibitions and collections. They include Born to Concrete, the Heide Collection, Heide Museum of Modern Art, Melbourne (2011); The Beauty of Distance: Songs of Survival in a Precarious Age, 17th Biennale of Sydney (2010); Mortality, Australian Centre for Contemporary Art, Melbourne (2010); Contemporary Australia: Optimism, Gallery of Modern Art/Queensland Art, Brisbane (2008–9); and International 04, Liverpool Biennial, (2004). Danko's work is held in many public collections, including the British Museum, the National Gallery of Australia and the major state and regional galleries of Australia, as well as university and private collections.

His work has been exhibited in the National Gallery of Victoria, Danko was the first artist selected by the National Gallery of Victoria for their national fellowship, which provides an income of $100,000 over two years.
