= QAGOMA =

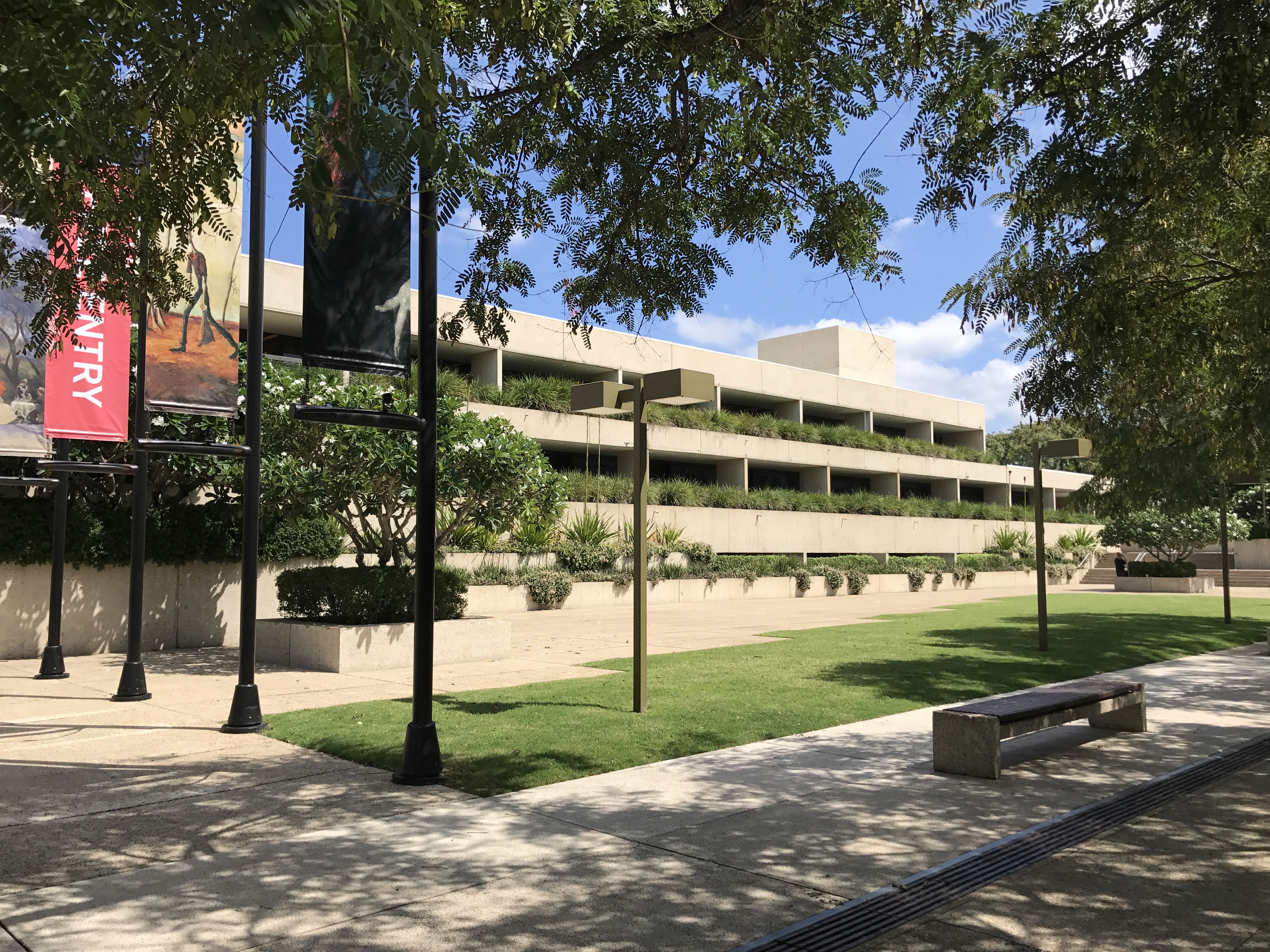
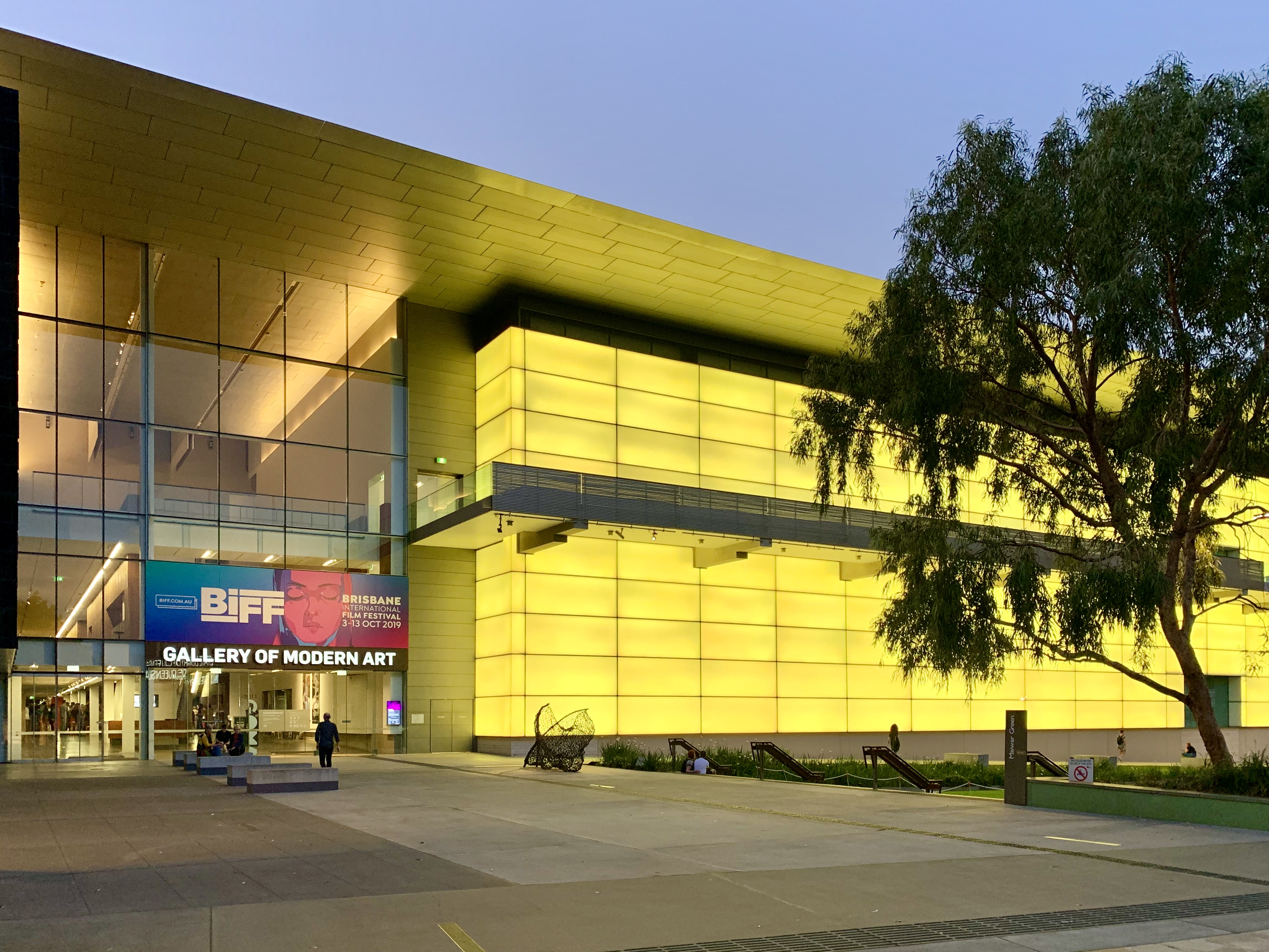
- From top: Queensland Art Gallery riverside, Gallery of Modern Art
- Established: 29 March 1895; 131 years ago
- Location: South Bank, Brisbane, Australia
- Coordinates: 27.4726°S 153.01828°E
- Type: Art museum
- Visitors: 1,146,277 (2019/20)
- Director: Chris Saines
- Public transit access: Bus: Cultural Centre station Train: South Brisbane station
- Website: qagoma.qld.gov.au

The Queensland Art Gallery and Gallery of Modern Art, colloquially known as QAGOMA, is an art museum in Brisbane, Queensland, Australia. The state's premier institution for the visual arts consists of the Queensland Art Gallery (QAG), and its neighbouring gallery, the Gallery of Modern Art (GOMA), situated 150 m (490 ft) away. Both are located within the Queensland Cultural Centre in South Bank. QAGOMA holds a collection of historical and contemporary Australian art and is a leading institution in the Asia-Pacific with a significant collection built through the exhibition ‘The Asia Pacific Triennial of Contemporary Art’.

== History ==
The museum was established in 1895 as the Queensland National Art Gallery, and throughout its early history was housed in a series of temporary premises. In 1982, the gallery moved to a permanent location in the Queensland Art Gallery, designed by architect Robin Gibson.

In 2006 the museum's second building, the Gallery of Modern Art, was opened, and was awarded the 2007 RAIA National Award for Public Architecture.

== Description ==
The art museum is colloquially known as QAGOMA. It consists of the Queensland Art Gallery (QAG) as its main building and the Gallery of Modern Art (GOMA), which houses the Australian Cinémathèque. Both buildings are located within the Queensland Cultural Centre in South Bank in Brisbane, and they are 150 m (490 ft) apart.

Visitor numbers for the 2019–20 year were at 1,146,277, a marked decline from recent years due to the COVID-19 pandemic in Australia. QAGOMA is the home of the Australian Centre of Asia Pacific Art and is also the host of the Asia Pacific Triennial of Contemporary Art.

== Collections ==
QAGOMA holds a collection of more than 20,000 artworks from Australia and around the world, with an internationally significant collection of contemporary Asian and Pacific art. It has extensive collections of Asian, Oceanian, Australian and Indigenous Australian art.

=== Asian ===
The gallery's historical Asian collection spans from the Neolithic period through to the 20th century, and highlights the artistic developments influenced by social change, philosophy and technique. The department aims to show the importance of cultural exchange in the region and its continuing role in the development of Asia's decorative traditions, and helps to contextualise the contemporary Asian collection. The works include painting, printmaking, sculpture, ceramics, textiles, metalware, lacquerware, photography and furniture.

The collection's highlights include:

Asian Ceramic Traditions

- Neolithic jars from Japan's Jōmon (3000–2000 BCE) and Yayoi (400–300 BCE) cultures and Kuan (storage jars) and an amphora from China's Neolithic Yangshao culture (3500–3000 BCE)
- Burial ware from the Tang dynasty (618–907), celadon from the Yuan (1279–1368) and Ming (1368–1644) dynasties, blue and white wares from the Kangxi period (1662–1722) and porcelain including imperial works from the Qing dynasty (1644–1912).
- Tsubo (lidless jars) from Japan's Six Ancient Kilns, dating from the Muromachi (1333–1573) and Azuchi–Momoyama (1573–1603) periods
- Ceramics by Ōtagaki Rengetsu (1791–1875)

Japanese Painting

- Screens from the Hasegawa school (1600–1868)
- Scenes from the Genji Monogatari The Tale of Genji by Tosa Mitsuatsu (1734–64)
- Birds and flowers of the four seasons by Kanō Yasunobu (1613–85)

Japanese Prints

- Ukiyo-e works by Hiroshige (1797–1858)
- Works by early masters such as Utamaro (1753–1806)
- Works by late masters such as Toyohara Chikanobu (1838–1912) and Yoshitoshi (1839–1892)

Historical South and Southeast Asian Art

- Bronze sculpture of the Orissan and Later Chola period (c.860–1279)
- Miniature paintings of Mughal and Rajput courts (18th–19th centuries)
- Ornamented weaponry from Indonesia and Malaysia

QAGOMA's contemporary Asian art collection is among the most extensive of its kind in the world, with over one thousand works dating from the late 1960s to the present, documenting modern historical trends of social change and changing patterns of artistic production. The collection demonstrates the contributions of Asian artists to global contemporary art, and the influence of traditions, philosophies and techniques. The collection includes leading artists from all parts of Asia, as well as the Asian diaspora with strengths in contemporary Chinese art, contemporary Japanese art, contemporary Indian art and a major collection of Southeast Asian art. Some of the artists represented include Xu Bing, Atul Dodiya, Nam June Paik, Yayoi Kusama, Lee Ufan and Ai Weiwei.

Asian Art collection
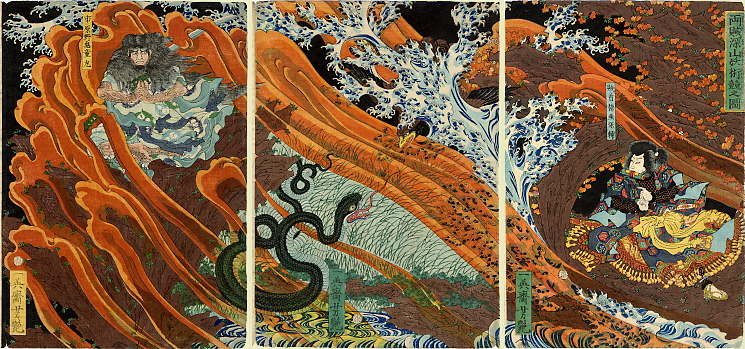
The Battle of Magic, 1860 – Utagawa Yoshitsuya

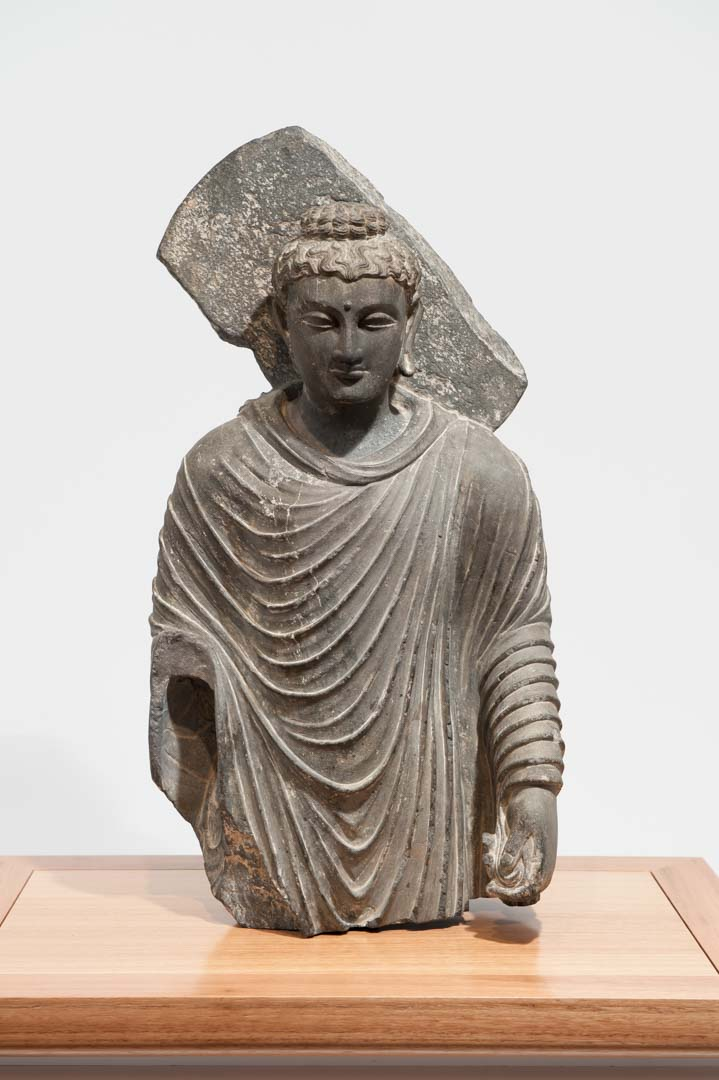
Buddha, 2nd–3rd century CE – Unknown

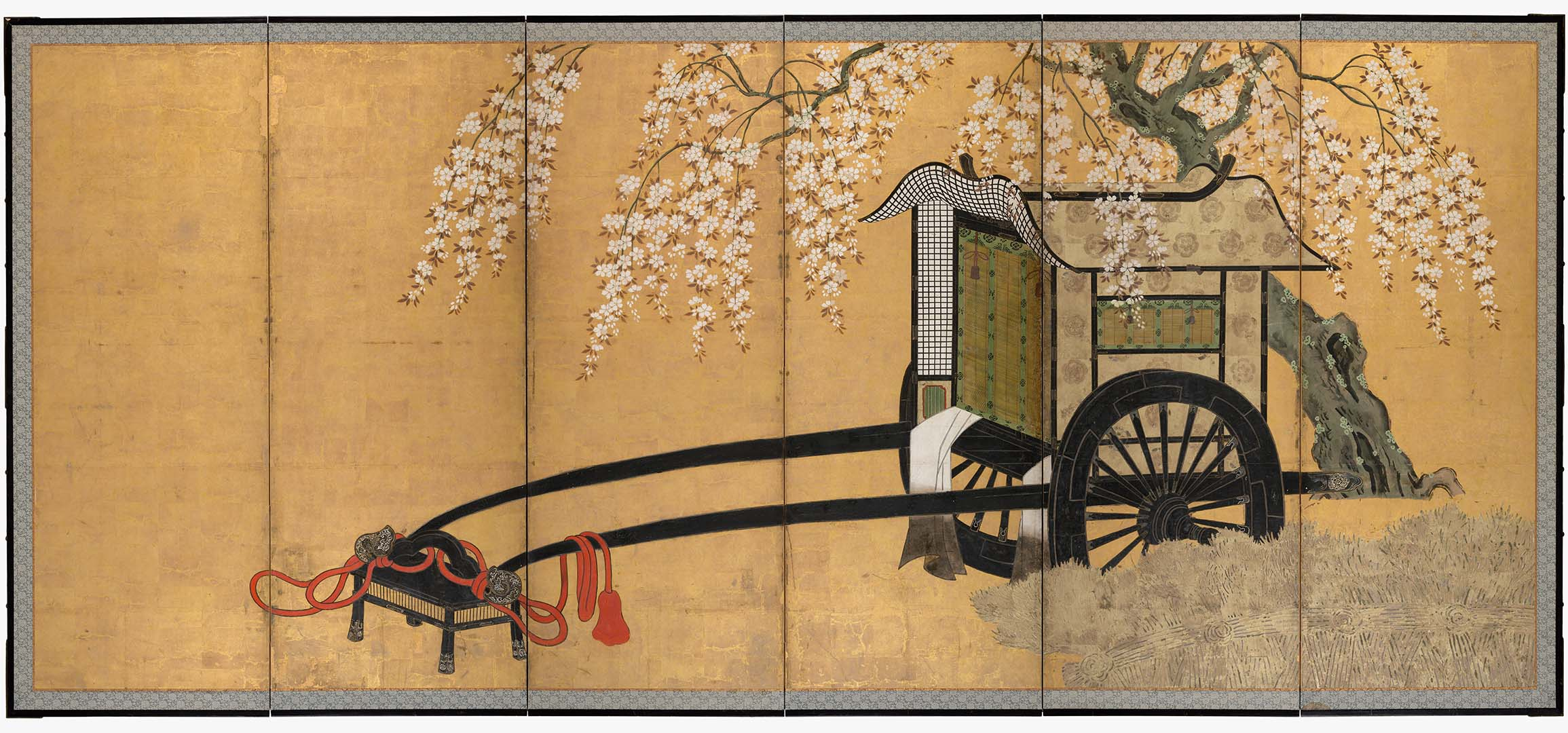
Six-fold screen with nobleman's cart under a flowering cherry tree c.1650 – Unknown

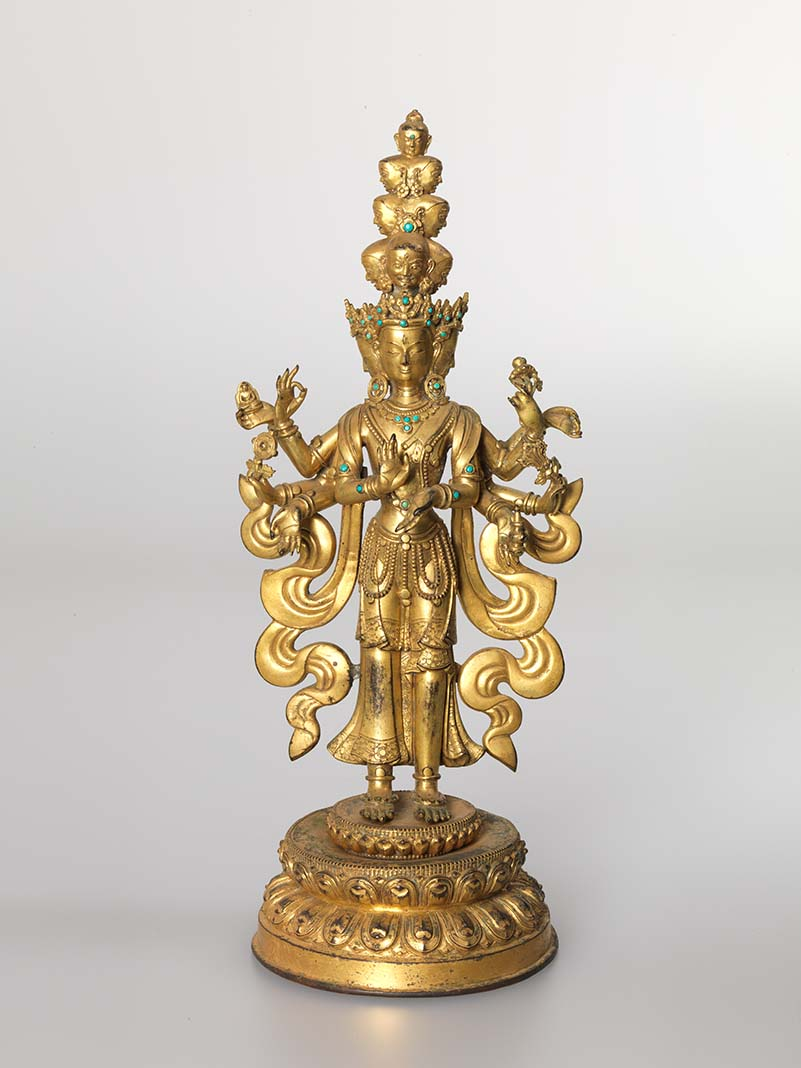
Eleven-headed Avalokitesvara Late 18th century – (Nepal)

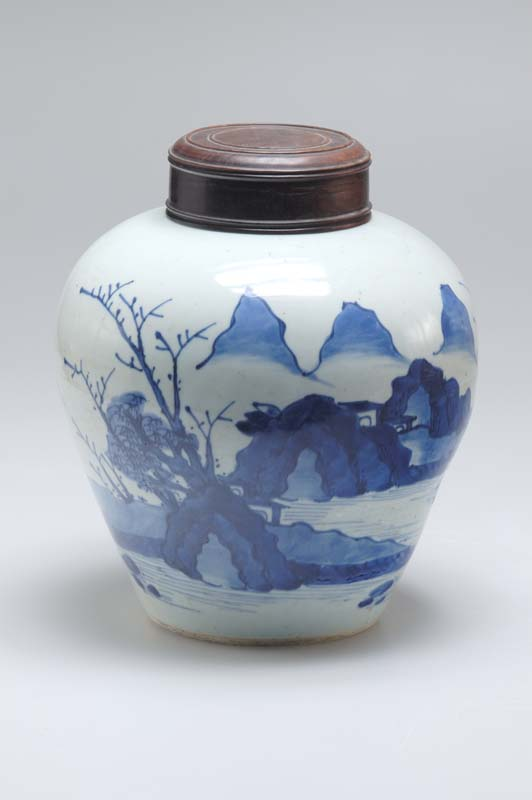
White porcelain baluster Late 18th–early 19th century (Qing dynasty) – (China)

=== Australian ===
The gallery's Australian art collection dates from the colonial period onward, and presents historical moments of first contact, settlement, exploration and immigration. Works from the colonial period highlight the influence of European traditions, and the emergence of a distinctly Australian vernacular with the Heidelberg School movement in the late 19th century. The Australian artists featured in the collection include Eugene von Guerard, John Glover, Richard Godfrey Rivers, Fred Williams, Ray Crooke, Russell Drysdale, Charles Conder, Ethel Carrick, Sam Fullbrook, Vida Lahey, Sidney Nolan, Rupert Bunny, Louis Buvelot, William Bustard, Bessie Gibson, John Russell, William Dobell, Ian Fairweather, John Perceval, Arthur Boyd, E. Phillips Fox, Margaret Preston, John Brack, Charles Blackman, Hans Heysen, Sydney Long, Margaret Olley, Hugh Ramsay, Arthur Streeton and Tom Roberts.

The collection's highlights include:

Australian Painting

- Still glides the stream and shall forever glide by Arthur Streeton (1895)
- La Pointe de Morestil par mer calme (Calm sea at Morestil Point) by John Russell (1901)
- Under the Jacaranda by Richard Godfrey Rivers (1903)
- Bathers by Rupert Bunny (1906)
- Bathing hour (L'heure du bain) by E. Phillips Fox (c.1909)
- Monday morning by Vida Lahey (1912)
- Jeune femme en rose pâle (Young woman in pale pink) by Bessie Gibson (1932)
- The Cypriot by William Dobell (1940)
- Man feeding his dogs by Russell Drysdale (1941)
- Journey into the you beaut country no. 2 by John Olsen (1961)

QAGOMA's contemporary Australian collection reflects the diversity of people in Australia, and dates from the conceptual/abstract art of the late 1960s–70s to the present. Many of the works recognise the core collecting areas of painting, sculpture, drawing, printmaking, glass and ceramics, while expanding to include artists' increasing use of a wider variety of media including photography, digital media and film. Leading artists represented in the collection include Peter Booth, eX De Medici, Fiona Hall, Bea Maddock, Jan Nelson, Patricia Piccinini, Tony Tuckson, Anne Ferran, Bill Henson, Rosemary Laing, Pat Brassington, Tracey Moffatt, Savanhdary Vongpoothorn, Gwyn Hanssen Pigott, Hossein Valamanesh, Ian Burn, Aleks Danko, Susan Norrie and Mike Parr.

Australian Art collection
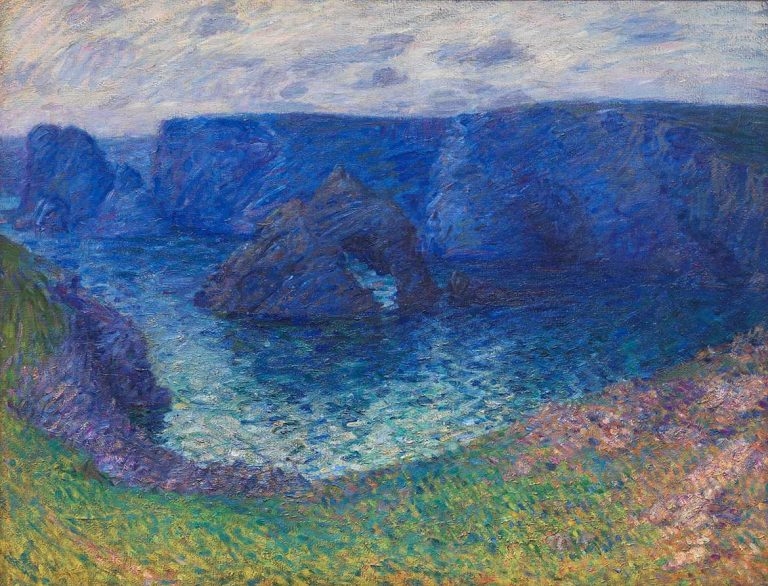
Roc Toul (Roche Guibel) (Toul Rock (Guibel Rock)) 1904–05 – John Russell

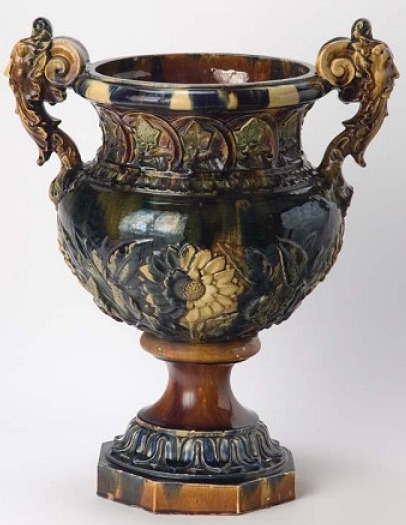
Jardiniere c.1890 – James Campbell & Sons

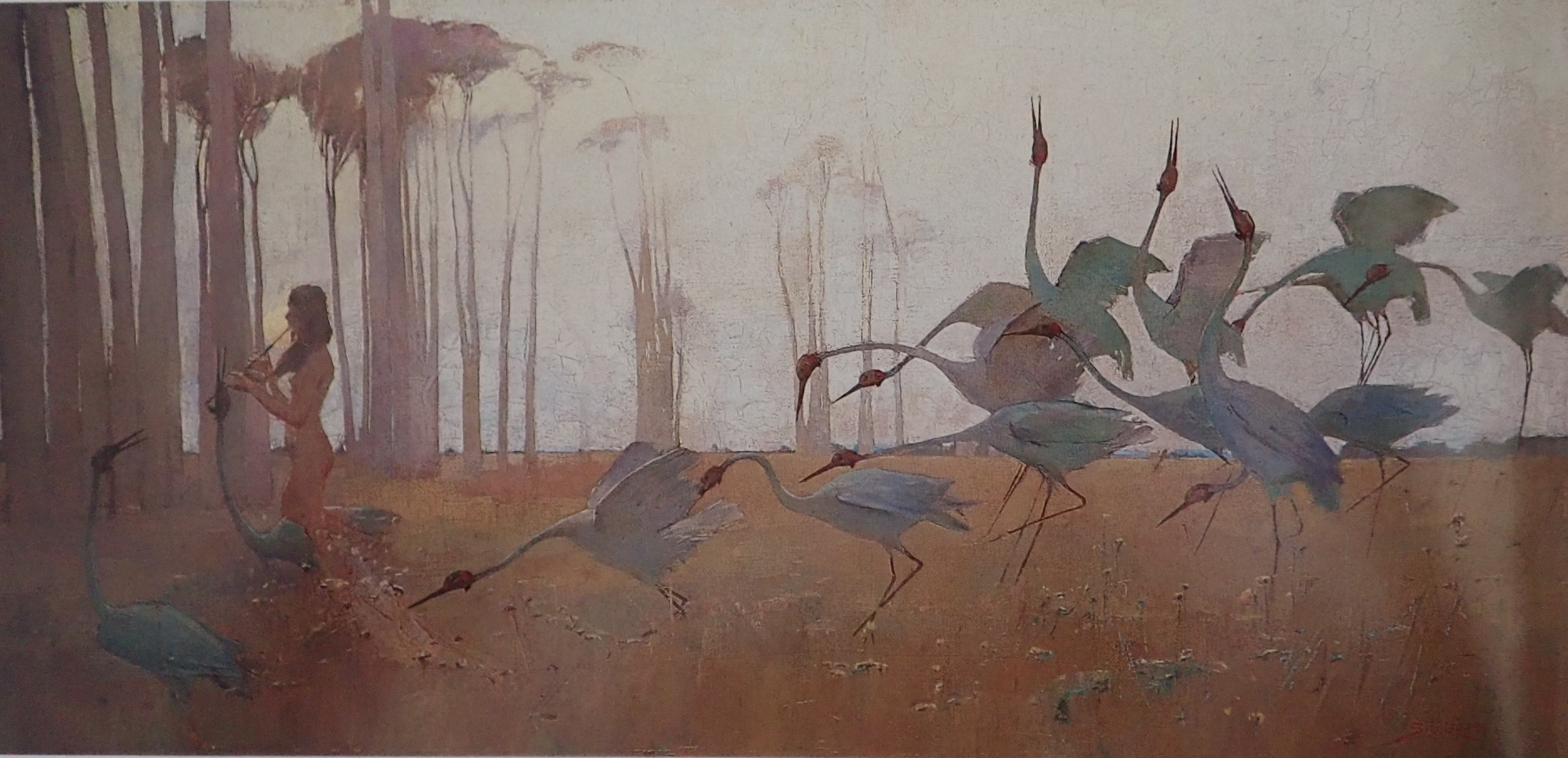
Spirit of the Plains 1897 – Sydney Long

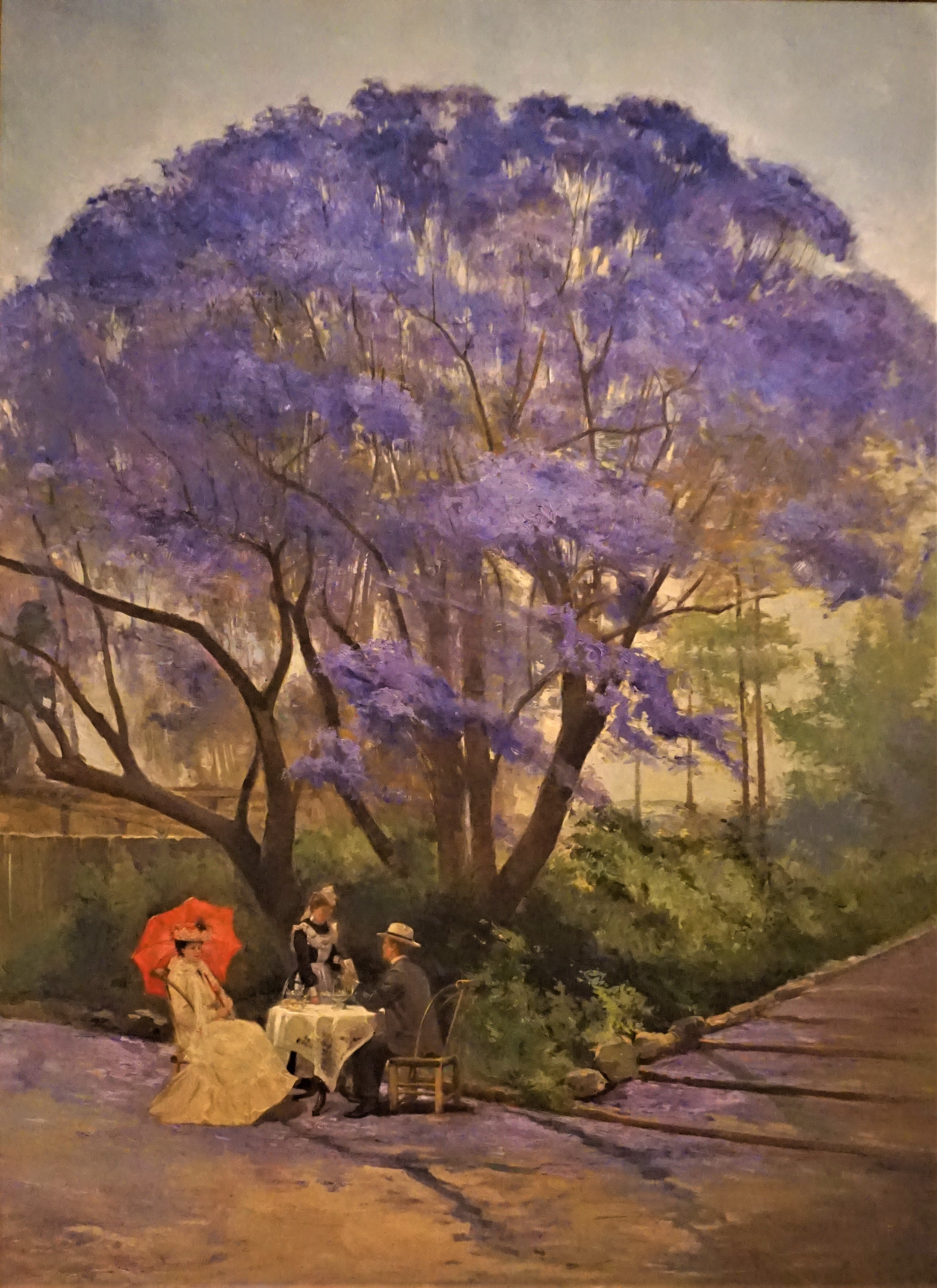
Under the Jacaranda 1903 – Richard Godfrey Rivers

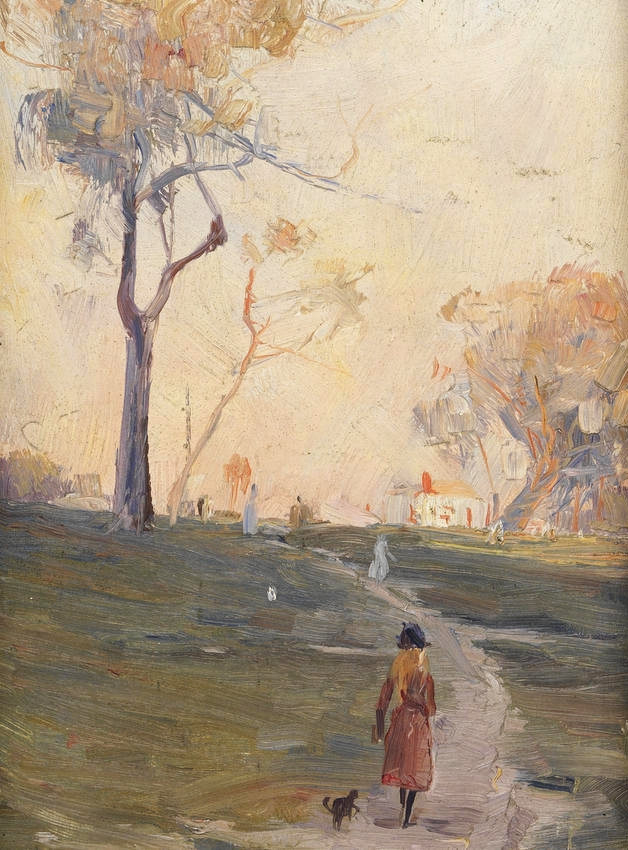
The road up the hill c.1889 – Arthur Streeton

=== Western European and North American ===
The gallery's historical international art collection focuses on Western European and North American work, and spans from the early Renaissance to the second half of the 20th century. The collection has strengths in Northern Renaissance; British art from the late 18th to the late 19th century, including Victorian and Edwardian painting; and modern European and American painting, sculpture, photography and prints from the late 19th century to the second half of the 20th century. The majority of the over 2000 works in this area are Western European.

The collection's highlights include:

Old Master

- Virgin and Child with Saint James the Pilgrim, Saint Catherine and the Donor with Saint Peter c.1496 Master of Frankfurt
- Cristo risorgente (The risen Christ) c.1555 Tintoretto
- Young woman in a fur wrap (after Titian) c.1629–30 Peter Paul Rubens
- Portrait of Marchese Filippo Spinola c.1622–27 Anthony van Dyck
Historical International collection
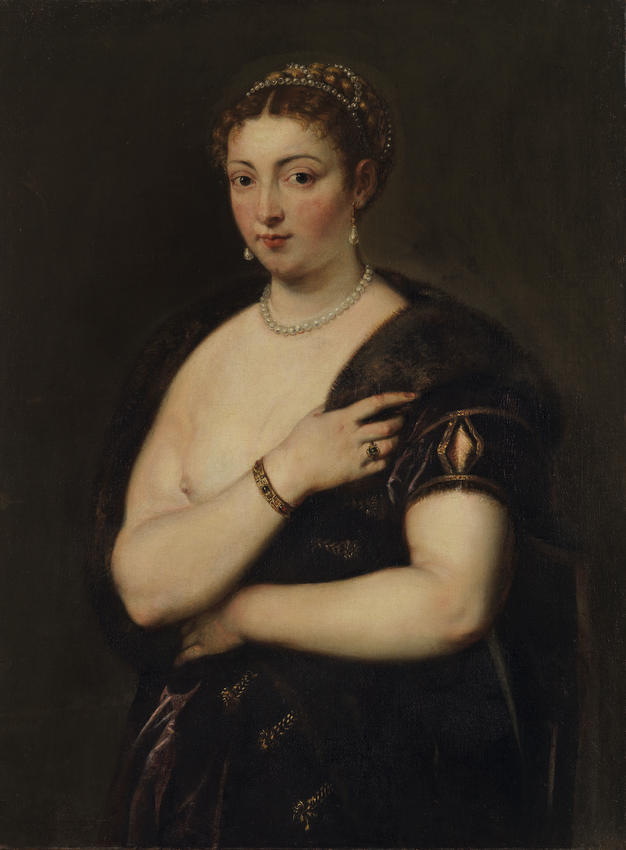
Young woman in a fur wrap (after Titian) c.1629–30 – Peter Paul Rubens

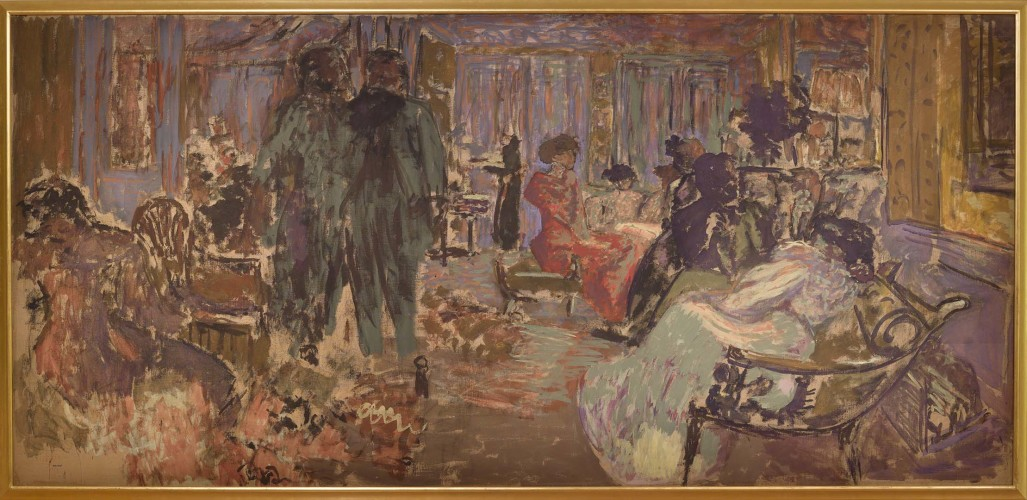
Le salon des Hessel c.1905 – Édouard Vuillard

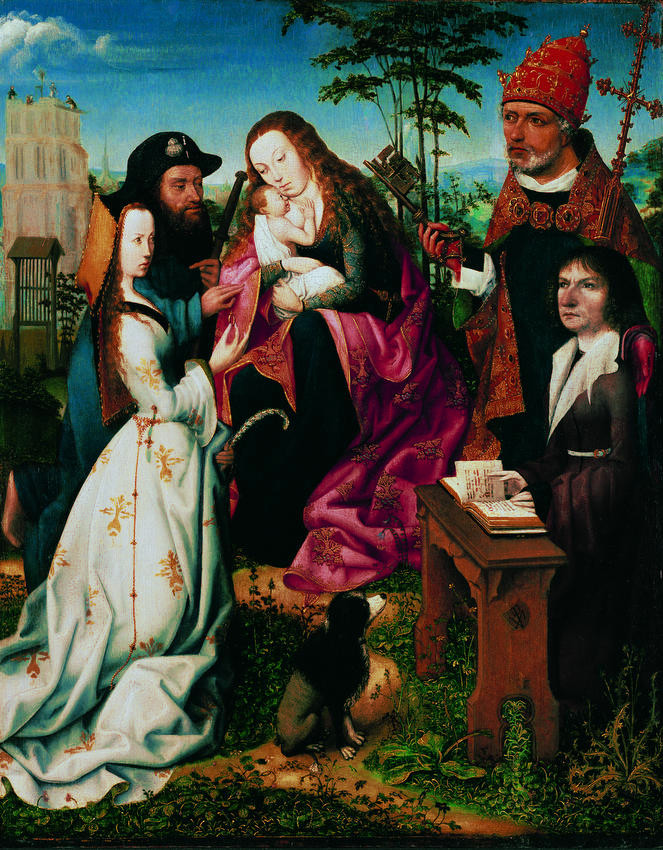
Virgin and Child with Saint James the Pilgrim, Saint Catherine and the Donor with Saint Peter c.1496 – Master of Frankfurt

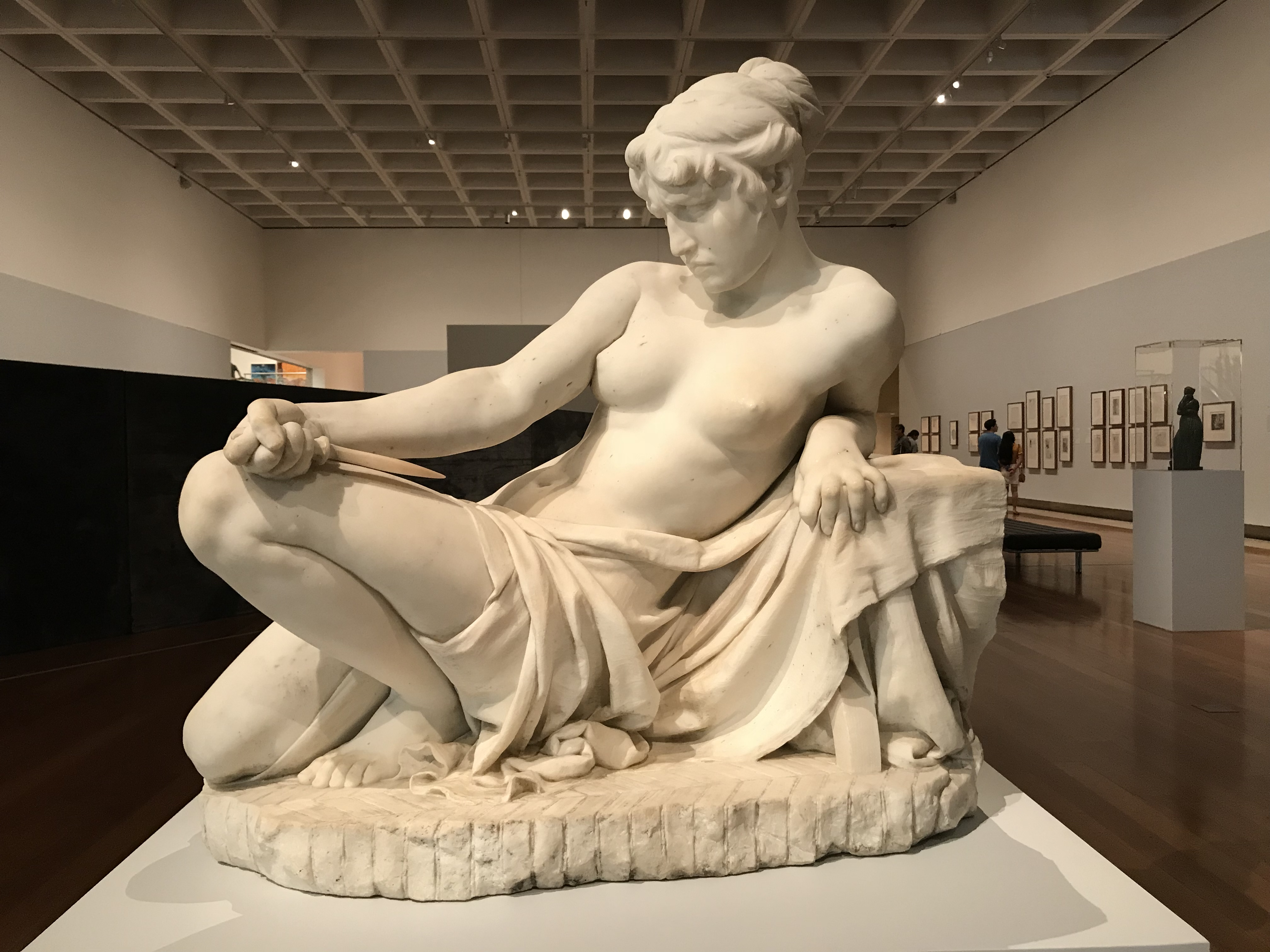
Lucretia 19th century – Giacomo Ginotti

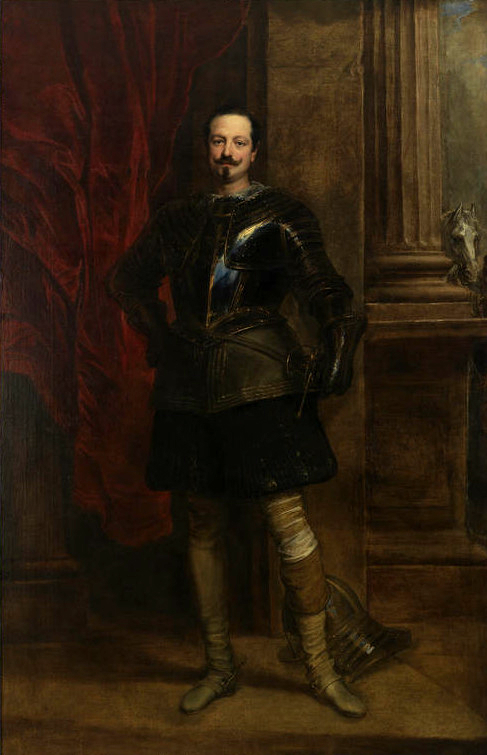
Portrait of Marchese Filippo Spinola c.1622–27 – Anthony van Dyck
