= Leonard Bell Cox =

Australian neurologist, art collector and administrator

- Born: 29 August 1894
- Died: 24 July 1976 (aged 81)
- Scientific career
- Fields: Neurology

Leonard Bell Cox (29 August 1894 – 24 July 1976) was an Australian neurologist as well as an art collector and administrator. Born in Melbourne to English parents, he was a school friend of Robert Menzies. He earned his medical degree at the University of Melbourne before serving in the Royal Australian Army Medical Corps at the Western Front. Returning to Australia, he became a founding member of the Australian Association of Neurologists and a distinguished collector of Chinese art, succeeding H. W. Kent as the honorary curator of the National Gallery of Victoria's Oriental art collection. Besides his medical publications, he also penned The National Gallery of Victoria 1861 to 1968 and was active in the gallery's administration. Upon his death bequeathed books and art to the gallery. His gardens at Olinda provided numerous specimens for the National Rhododendron Gardens (now the Dandenong Ranges Botanic Garden).
