= Australian Flying Arts School =

Non-profit organisation supporting media arts

Flying Arts Alliance, Inc.
- Australian Flying Arts School
- Founded: 1971; 55 years ago
- Founder: Mervyn Moriarty
- Type: 501(c)(3)
- Purpose: Art education
- Location: Australia
- Region served: Queensland
- Website: flyingarts.org.au

External videos
- “About Flying Arts”, 2008. Click on mpg icon to view video.

The Australian Flying Arts School (now Flying Arts Alliance, Inc.) is a not-for-profit organisation that supports lifelong engagement in the visual and media arts throughout regional and remote Queensland. It was founded in 1971 by Mervyn Moriarty, who flew his plane more than 400,000 km (250,000 mi) over the next 12 years to visit remote areas of Queensland and deliver art education. Moriarty's Flying Arts, Gertrude Langer's Arts Council of Queensland and Arthur Creedy's Cultural Activities Department are credited with sparking the creation of private galleries and regional centres for the visual arts throughout Queensland.

Since then, Flying Arts has worked with many more artists who travel to regional communities throughout Queensland to share their knowledge. The program has been described as "a catalyst which brought social regeneration for hundreds of women living on rural properties and in large and small regional towns throughout Queensland."

As of 25 July 2018, Flying Arts also administers the Regional Arts Fund (RAF) for Queensland, an Australian Government program. As part of the Queensland Regional Art Awards, Flying Arts presents an annual 'Art for Life' Award for artists from regional and remote Queensland. Flying Arts also curates an annual touring exhibition of works submitted to each year's Queensland Regional Art Awards.

== History ==
In 1970, Mervyn Moriarty won the Cook Bicentenary Art Award with his painting Another Place. He used the prize money to take flying lessons, with the intention of establishing a flying school to provide art lessons to remote inhabitants of the Queensland Outback. Queensland is a vast decentralised area comparable in size to all of Western Europe, approximately 1,728,000 km^{2} (667,000 sq mi). It is home to about 38 per cent of Queensland's population.

Moriarty and his wife Helen registered the school as the EastAus Art School, with an address at 207 Adelaide Street, Brisbane. They created lessons for students. They gathered contacts with the help of Gertrude Langer and the enthusiastic encouragement of the state Director of Cultural Activities, Arthur Creedy. The school advertised through word-of-mouth, newspapers, and brochures. While waiting for his pilot's licence to be issued, Moriarty began teaching in Brisbane. On 24 September 1971 he received his unrestricted pilot's licence, hired a 4-seater Cherokee airplane, and flew out of Archerfield Airport near Brisbane on the fledgling flight of the Flying Arts school, in a 6,000 km (3,700 mi) solo trip to meet with regional representatives throughout Queensland.

Moriarty actively sought funding to establish the program. After the Arts Council of Australia turned down his application for funding in 1973, Moriarty wrote directly to the Prime Minister of Australia, Gough Whitlam. Artist Clifton Pugh was sent to accompany Moriarty on a trip and positively reported on the project. As a result, the program received major federal funding, and changed its name in 1974 to the Australian Flying Arts School.

When the Whitlam government left office in November 1975, the school lost that funding stream. In 1978 it joined with the Kelvin Grove College of Advanced Education (KGCAE). It was formally established as a charity in 1978. Finances were an ongoing source of stress for Moriarty and his wife and their marriage ended. Moriarty left the school at the end of 1982, and went on to found the Brisbane Arts School (now Brisbane Institute of Art).

Funding for the school was a recurrent issue for many years. The election of Queensland Premier Wayne Goss and the Australian Labor Party in December 1989 and the federal government's Dawkins Higher Education reforms, combined to emphasise professionalisation of the arts. Kelvin Grove became a campus of the Queensland University of Technology (QUT), a public research university, and Flying Arts officially became part of the University College of Southern Queensland (UCSQ) (now the University of Southern Queensland) in Toowoomba while keeping its office in Brisbane. Under government funding initiatives for 1991 the students of Flying Arts were considered "hobby artists" and were not eligible for funding.

In 1994, the Australian Flying Arts School became "Flying Arts Inc." Its first CEO, Christine Campbell, and its management committee were able to organise multiple avenues of funding from UCSQ, grants from Arts Queensland, and corporate sponsorship.

Between August 1979 and October 2008, Flying Arts documented its work through the publication of the periodicals A.F.A.S. Gazette, the Flying Arts Gazette and Update. Many related documents, papers and ephemera are held in the collections of the State Library of Queensland and the Australian Library of Art.

The Flying Arts Book (2000) by Anne Lord combines information about the Flying Arts program with original prints by eighteen of its artists. From River Banks to Shearing Sheds : 30 Years with Flying Arts (2009) by Marilyn England discusses the program in depth.

== Teachers ==
Moriarty was the principal art teacher of the organisation between 1971 and 1983, flying his airplane more than 400,000 km (250,000 mi) on more than 1250 trips to at least 25 different locations from Queensland to the Torres Strait Islands. Among them were Blackall, Mount Isa, Quilpie, Weipa and Thursday Island. During an average year, Moriarty made four tours, each tour lasting two to three weeks. Additional trips were made to organise special events such as exhibitions.

"It's really about overcoming the tyranny of distance and allowing people in regional and remote areas to have access to some of the arts and creative endeavours that people in the city take for granted," Clare Poppi, 2017.

By the 1980s, small teams of 2–3 teachers were travelling in a four-seater, single-engine Cessna airplane. Potter Gwyn Hanssen Pigott recalls the challenges of working in a new location each day with a group of from 4 to 20 people of widely varying experience.

"This was a unique sort of teaching and tested our wits. Every day there was a new group, perhaps four or five in a shearing shed or some twenty or so at a regional college of technical and further education (TAFE colleges). There were usually novices and veterans together, all expecting troubleshooters with wise words."

As of 2005, more than 30 artists were involved in teaching classes for Flying Arts, travelling to over 60 communities and schools per year via plane, bus, train, hire car and a company station wagon specially equipped to repel kangaroos. Flying Arts is discussed as a model of pedagogy for "harnessing new technologies to contribute to communication between groups of visual artists with different backgrounds and cultural experience".

== Students ==
It has been calculated that the Flying Arts school reached over six thousand students in its first thirty years, the majority of them women. Many were inhabitants of far-flung properties. Some left their families and travelled hundreds of kilometres to participate in creative art workshops led by practising artists. Given the isolation of many of the stations, and the condition (or lack) of roads, weather had a significant impact on whether it was feasible for people to attend and for the classes to continue at particular locations.

Social contact with both teachers and fellow students who shared their interests was seen as an important aspect of the experience, breaking through mental isolation as well as giving them an outlet for their creativity. Indjilandji artist Shirley Macnamara who creates woven vessels and other forms from natural materials such as spinifex has credited Flying Arts with showing her "there are no limitations to one's creativity".

In 2019, Flying Arts organised the tour and exhibition project Colour and Response to document the impact of Merv Moriarty and Flying Arts throughout Queensland. Flying Arts centres worked with exhibition lead Lisa Beilby to develop local exhibitions in collaboration with the travelling exhibition Colour II, Merv Moriarty in the Field. Local partner exhibitions included Roma, with the exhibition From the Verandah and the Gladstone Regional Art Gallery & Museum with the exhibition Flying Arts and the Gladstone Region, including works by Anne Huth and others. The Bundaberg Regional Art Gallery showcased the Allamanda Gallery and Flying Arts students Ann Grocott, Jennifer McDuff, Marvene Ash, John Honeywill, and Coralie Busby in the exhibition Out of The Allamanda.
