= Gwyn Hanssen Pigott =

Australian artist (1935–2013)

- Gwyn Hanssen Pigott in 1961
- Born: Gwynion Lawrie John; January 1, 1935; Ballarat, Victoria
- Died: July 5, 2013 (aged 78); London, England
- Known for: potter
- Spouse: Louis Hanssen (1960 - 1965) John Pigott (1976 - 1980)
- Awards: Medal of the Order of Australia (OAM) (2002); Australia Council Fellowship Award (1998); Fellow, Society of Designer Craftsmen (1963)

Gwyn Hanssen Pigott OAM (1935–2013) was an Australian ceramic artist. She was recognized as one of Australia’s most significant contemporary artists. By the time she died she was regarded as "one of the world's greatest contemporary potters". She worked in Australia, England, Europe, the US, New Zealand, Japan and Korea. In a career spanning nearly 60 years, influences from her apprenticeships to English potters were still apparent in her later work. In the 1980s, she turned away from production pottery to making porcelain still-life groups largely influenced by the Italian painter Giorgio Morandi.

== Early years 1935–1955 ==
Gwyn Hanssen Pigott was born Gwynion Lawrie John on 1 January 1935 in Ballarat, Australia. She was the second of four daughters. Her father was director of an engineering firm and her mother an eclectic arts and crafts teacher–practitioner who surrounded her children with craft objects she had made.

In 1954, she received her Bachelor of Arts from the University of Melbourne. Hanssen Pigott’s first introduction to ceramics was in the 1950s while a university student, taken with the Kent Collection of Chinese and Korean wares at the National Gallery of Victoria. Excited by Bernard Leach's A Potter's Book, she researched pottery in Australia for her honours thesis. She discovered and was enthralled by Ivan McMeekin, who had been apprenticed to both Bernard Leach and Michael Cardew in England. She abandoned her honours year and started an apprenticeship with McMeekin.

== Apprenticeships 1955–1966 ==
Between 1955 and 1959, Hanssen Pigott (as Gwyn John) held apprenticeships with several influential potters from both Australia and England. Her apprenticeship with McMeekin was at Sturt Pottery in Mittagong, New South Wales 1955–1957. McMeekin established Sturt Pottery in 1953 to make and teach pottery in the studio traditions of Leach and Cardew, which emphasized the use of local materials for small-scale studio production. At that time all clay bodies had to be made from hand-processed raw ceramic materials, as they were not available as commercially pre-mixed products. While at Sturt Pottery, Hanssen Pigott came to appreciate the given and induced qualities of clay in addition to learning to admire form and beauty in a pot.

Hanssen Pigott traveled to England in 1958. She first worked with Ray Finch at Winchcombe Pottery, established by Michael Cardew in 1926. In the same year she apprenticed with Bernard Leach at St Ives, and Michael Cardew himself at Wenford Bridge. In 1960 she left Cornwall with her newlywed poet husband, Louis Hanssen to establish with him a studio in Portobello Road, London. During their time in London, Hanssen Pigott (as Gwyn Hanssen) enrolled in evening classes at the Camberwell School of Art with Lucie Rie. Her work at this time was sometimes marked GH, sometimes simply H. She separated from Louis Hanssen in 1965.

== Functional pottery 1966–1973 ==
In 1966, after several visits, she moved to Achères, France where she bought a small house and set up her own pottery studio. She maintained a wood-fired kiln and dug her own clay. Though the clay was "faultless" she began increasingly to use porcelain bodies made for porcelain factories at Vierzon nearby. "She never produced a standard line, published a catalogue or made a vase."

The domestic pot is considered to be an inferior object. For me there is no distinction between repeated and individual wares.

Her potter's mark remained an impressed monogram GH. This is the decade in which she is regarded as having made "some of the finest functional stoneware and porcelain of all time". Her work made her well known in the international ceramics community and she often taught in the United States and the Netherlands. This period was celebrated by a big show of her work at the British Craft Centre in London in 1971.

== Decorated pottery 1973–1983 ==
In 1973, she returned to Australia, moving to Tasmania in 1974 and marrying her studio assistant John Pigott in 1976. Under the name Gwyn Hanssen Pigott, she and her husband set up a pottery workshop in Tasmania with financial help from the Crafts Board of the Australia Council.

We raw-glazed and fired with wood, and John blended clays and minerals from the far reaches of the island into stoneware and porcelain bodies and decorating pigments. Our work showed a definite European peasant bias and our markets were mainly local.

In 1980 she separated from John Pigott. (She separated from each husband by moving away geographically but keeping his friendship and his surname.) She was a “tenant potter” that year in Adelaide at the Jam Factory Craft Centre. Having to "work with gas … I threw porcelain table settings, usually blue-grey or green celadon with a range of washed-out shino-type colours. And … I made a body of decorated work." She continued this work 1981–1989 as potter in residence at the Queensland University of Technology: gas-fired dinner settings, wood-fired pots decorated with tiny patterns of indigo, ultimately picked out in gold.

== Still-life pottery 1984–2013 ==
Hanssen Pigott returned to London for a show of her work at the Casson Gallery in 1984. Catching up with developments of the previous decade and reconnecting with her peers, she was overcome by a sense of "shallowness" and lack of "humanness" in her work. Thus began the last and most famous period of her career. In this period she was based in country Queensland but showed her work especially through Garry Anderson (1956–1991) and his austere gallery in Sydney. From this time her potter's mark was an impressed O.

In her earlier work, Hanssen Pigott focused on producing functional ceramic wares. But she is best known for her more recent objects: three dimensional still life groupings of wood-fired porcelain with names like The Listeners and Breath—on which she worked from the 1980s. Caravan, an installation at Tate St Ives in 2004, was fifty-five-feet long. The groupings were mainly, though not entirely, inspired by the still-life paintings of the Italian Giorgio Morandi. She herself regarded the change as curious, a distancing from objects in themselves so personal and handy.

I am surprised. It is a weird idea. It is not what I thought my work would ever be about when I tried to live like the unknown craftsman in a hamlet in France, or a hillside in Tasmania. It is alarmingly contradictory; to make pots that are sweet to use and then to place them almost out of reach.

She hints in her Autobiographical Notes that this distancing was encouraged by seeing so much of country Queensland from the air as a teacher for the Australian Flying Arts School. Prompted by her evocative titles, nearly all viewers endow the work of this period with symbolic or metaphoric meaning.

In 1989 she was the artist in residence at the Fremantle Arts Centre. Later that year she moved to Netherdale in north Queensland. In 1993 Hanssen Pigott was awarded a three-year Artist Development Fellowship by the Australia Council. In 1994 she was the artist in residence in the Ceramics Department of the School of Mines and Industries, Ballarat – her home town. In 2000 she set up a final pottery in Ipswich in south-eastern Queensland.

In 2005, the National Gallery of Victoria held a retrospective exhibition Gwyn Hanssen Pigott: A Survey 1955–2005 with a 112-page catalogue.

Gwyn Hanssen Pigott died on Friday 5 July 2013 in London, after suffering a stroke. She had been arranging a show there.

== Influences ==
The variety of influence from Song Dynasty glazes and palettes to Leach–Cardew forms can be clearly seen in Hanssen Pigott's work. She has also written about her interest in the quiet still lifes of Italian painter, Giorgio Morandi, which influenced her later work.

=== Song Dynasty ware ===
The Northern Song wares concentrated on the meditative qualities of form. Glazing was rich in colour, but decoration on the surfaces was minimal. What decoration there was delicate and restrained. The work is technically very accomplished.

=== Leach and Cardew ===
In addition to her adherence to the aesthetic of the Song Dynasty wares, Hanssen Pigott describes her own sense of form, which is aligned with the Cardew–Leach philosophy of the importance of the everyday and of humility in pottery:

About form. I am sure that the forms of the most common, everyday utensils can evoke so much that is inexpressible in any other language, about humanness.

=== Giorgio Morandi ===
Hanssen Piggot might have come to arranging her work in groupings as still life compositions reluctantly, but it was definitely not without influences. Hanssen Piggot describes her interest in the paintings of Italian Giorgio Morandi in her essay Truth in Form: Pulled-Back Simplicity. The still lifes of the English painter Ben Nicholson also played a part. Hanssen Pigott describes how her work differs from the aspirations of Leach and Cardew:

I no longer care if the cup, with its careful handle and balanced weight (the heritage of years of tea set making), stands unused among a quiet group of table-top objects arranged as a still life, somewhere higher than table height. It is still a cup—an everyday object as ordinary and simple as can be—but from somewhere, because of its tense or tenuous relationship with other simple, recognized, even banal objects, pleasure comes.

== Collections ==
Gwyn Hanssen Pigott’s work can be found in the following collections.

=== Australian collections ===
Art Gallery of South Australia, Art Gallery of Western Australia, National Gallery of Australia, National Gallery of Victoria. Provincial galleries in Ballarat, Bathurst, Bendigo, Cairns, Castlemaine, Darwin, Devonport, Federation University Australia; Geelong, Gippsland, Gladstone, Gold Coast, Ipswich, Launceston, Newcastle, Orange, Shepparton, Stanthorpe and Townsville. Queensland University of Technology, Brisbane; University of New South Wales, Sydney; Tasmanian School of Art, Hobart.

=== International collections ===
Canada: Winnipeg Museum; Gardiner Museum, Toronto; France: Fina Gomez Collection, Paris; Germany: Dr. Hans Thiemann Collection, Hamburg; Ireland: Belfast Museum, Northern Ireland; Japan: Museum of Contemporary Ceramic Art, Shigaraki; Netherlands: Boijmans Museum, Rotterdam; New Zealand: Auckland Museum; United Kingdom: Crafts Council of Great Britain, London; Henry Rothschild Collection, Shipley Art Gallery; Crafts Study Centre, Farnham; Regional Galleries Bristol, Maidstone, Manchester and Paisley; Victoria and Albert Museum, London; York Art Gallery; USA: Charles A. Wustum Museum of Fine Arts, Racine, Wisconsin; Jack Lenor Larsen Collection; Los Angeles County Museum of Art.

== Honours ==
Her accolades include:

- 2002, Medal of the Order of Australia (OAM), "for service to the arts as a ceramic artist and teacher of the craft."
- 1998, Australia Council Fellowship 1998 Australia Council Fellowship Award.
- 1963, Fellow, Society of Designer Craftsmen, UK.
