= Shirley Macnamara =

Australian sculptor (born 1949)

- Born: 1949 (age 76–77)
- Known for: Sculpture, Painting

Shirley Anne Macnamara (born 1949) is an Australian Indigenous artist from the Indjilanji/Alyewarre language group of North West Queensland best known for her woven spinifex sculptures.

== Early life and education ==
Macnamara grew up on a cattle station near Camooweal, Queensland, where her family worked. She began her education at Camooweal State School. From 1989 she attended Australian Flying Arts School workshops in Queensland, working in watercolour. She also worked with mixed media, installation and sculpture before turning to weaving local spinifex to create organic forms.

== Work ==
Using the abundant spinifex grass in her people's country in northwest Queensland her weavings reflect the environment, intertwining the landscape with her personal and ancestral stories.

== Exhibitions, collections, awards ==
=== Solo exhibitions ===
- 'Dyinala, Nganinya', Queensland Art Gallery (21 September 2019 – 1 March 2020)
- 'Layered Threads', University of Queensland Art Museum, Brisbane (18 August – 24 November 2018)
- 'Maardi Butala', Alcaston Gallery, Melbourne (14–25 March 2017)
- 'Race against time', Alcaston Gallery, Melbourne (14 October – 7 November 2014)

=== Group exhibitions ===
- 15 Artists, Redcliffe Art Gallery, Moreton Bay Regional Council, Queensland, 2019
- 7th Asia Pacific Triennial of Contemporary Art at Queensland Art Gallery | Gallery of Modern Art (8 December 2012 – 14 April 2013).

=== Public collections ===
- Campbelltown Arts Centre
- National Gallery of Australia, Canberra
- Perc Tucker Regional Gallery, Townsville
- Queensland Art Gallery | Gallery of Modern Art

=== Awards ===
- 2017 Wandjuk Markira Memorial Three-Dimensional Award, 34th Telstra National Aboriginal and Torres Strait Islander Art Awards
