= Bessie Gibson =

Australian artist (1868–1961)

Elizabeth Dickson Gibson (16 May 1868 – 13 July 1961) was an Australian artist.

== Early life ==
Gibson was born on 16 May 1868 in Ipswich, Queensland, the daughter of bank manager James Gibson and Anne Bush Blair (née Copeland). The family moved to Manley, Brisbane when her father retired. She was taught art by prominent local artist Godfrey Rivers at the Brisbane Technical College from 1899 to 1905.

Inspired to study art abroad, her family financed a three-year study trip to Paris. Gibson left Australia in September 1905 and had established herself in Montparnasse, Paris by May 1906 where she lived until 1939.

== Career ==
Gibson was not a part of the avant-garde art scene of early twentieth century Paris. Instead, she worked within the conservative world of the Royal Academy and Salon exhibitions.

== Later life ==
Gibson left Paris in 1939 with the outbreak of World War II and spent the war years in England engaged in Red Cross work. When peace was declared she returned to Paris.

Returning to Australia in 1947, Gibson's work was almost unknown in Australia, despite recognition of the work of contemporary female expatriates. This is probably because of her shyness and her Queensland background.She was, however, recognised by the Royal Queensland Art Society who made her a Life Member in 1947.

Her work is now in several State galleries, the National Gallery of Australia and in private collections. She died in a Brisbane convalescent home on 13 July 1961 and was cremated.
