= Master of Frankfurt =

Flemish renaissance painter active in antwerp between about 1480 and 1520

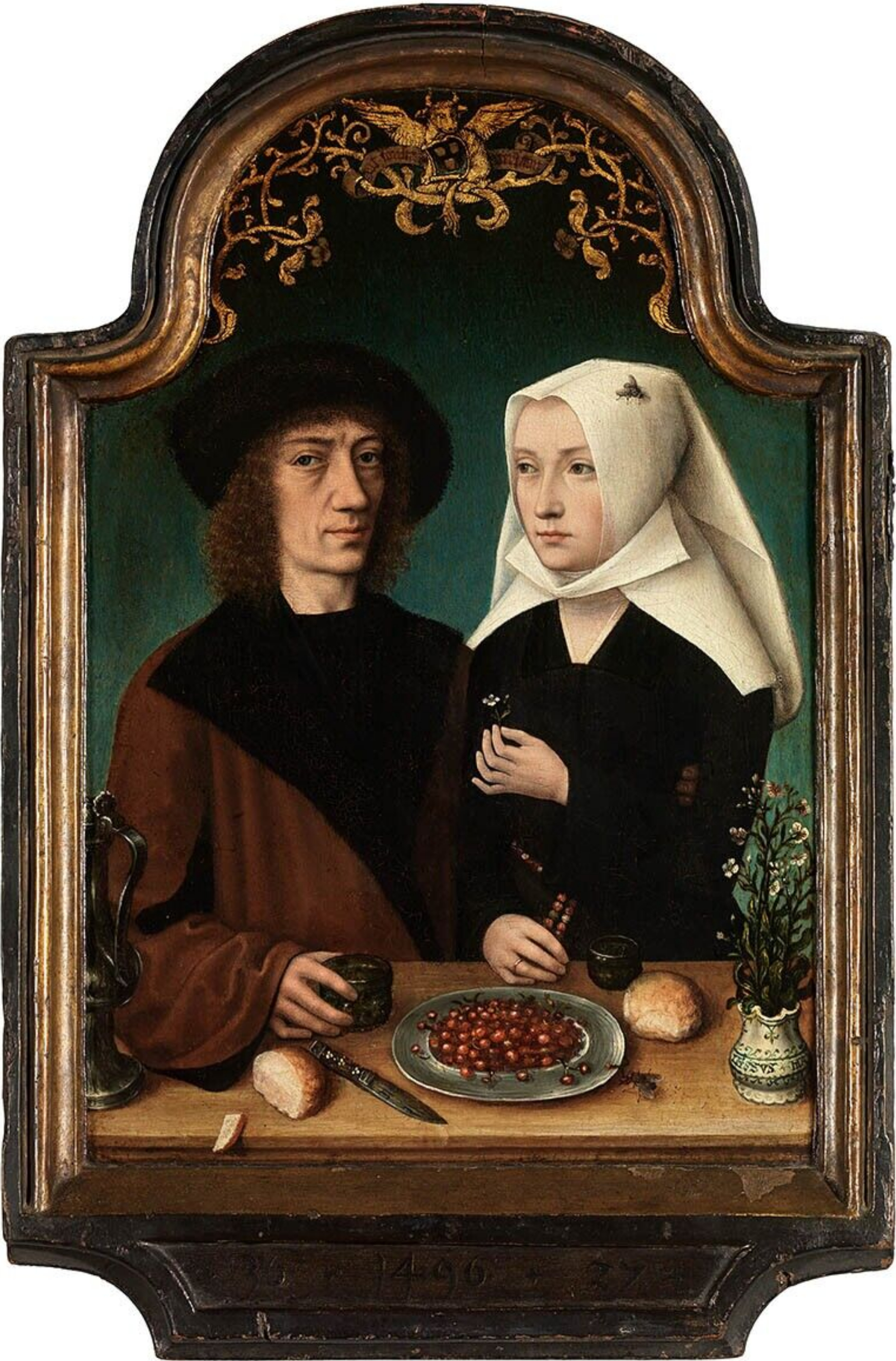
Master of Frankfurt, Self portrait of the artist with his wife, 1496. Royal Museum of Fine Arts, Antwerp. This painting, in its original, dated, frame of 1496 shows a double portrait of the artist and his wife. The painter has included life-sized trompe-l'œil flies—seemingly on the painting's surface—an allusion to the classical artistic deceptions of Zeuxis and Parrhasius.

The Master of Frankfurt (c. 1460–c. 1533) was a Flemish Renaissance painter active in Antwerp between about 1480 and 1520. Although he probably never visited Frankfurt am Main, his name derives from two paintings commissioned from patrons in that city, the Holy Kinship (c. 1503) in the Frankfurt Historical Museum and a Crucifixion in the Städel museum.

He is one of many anonymous artists identifiable by their painting style but not by name. The Master of Frankfurt is, however, often thought to be a Hendrik van Wueluwe, an artist famous in Antwerp around the same time as the anonymous painter but otherwise unconnected to any paintings.

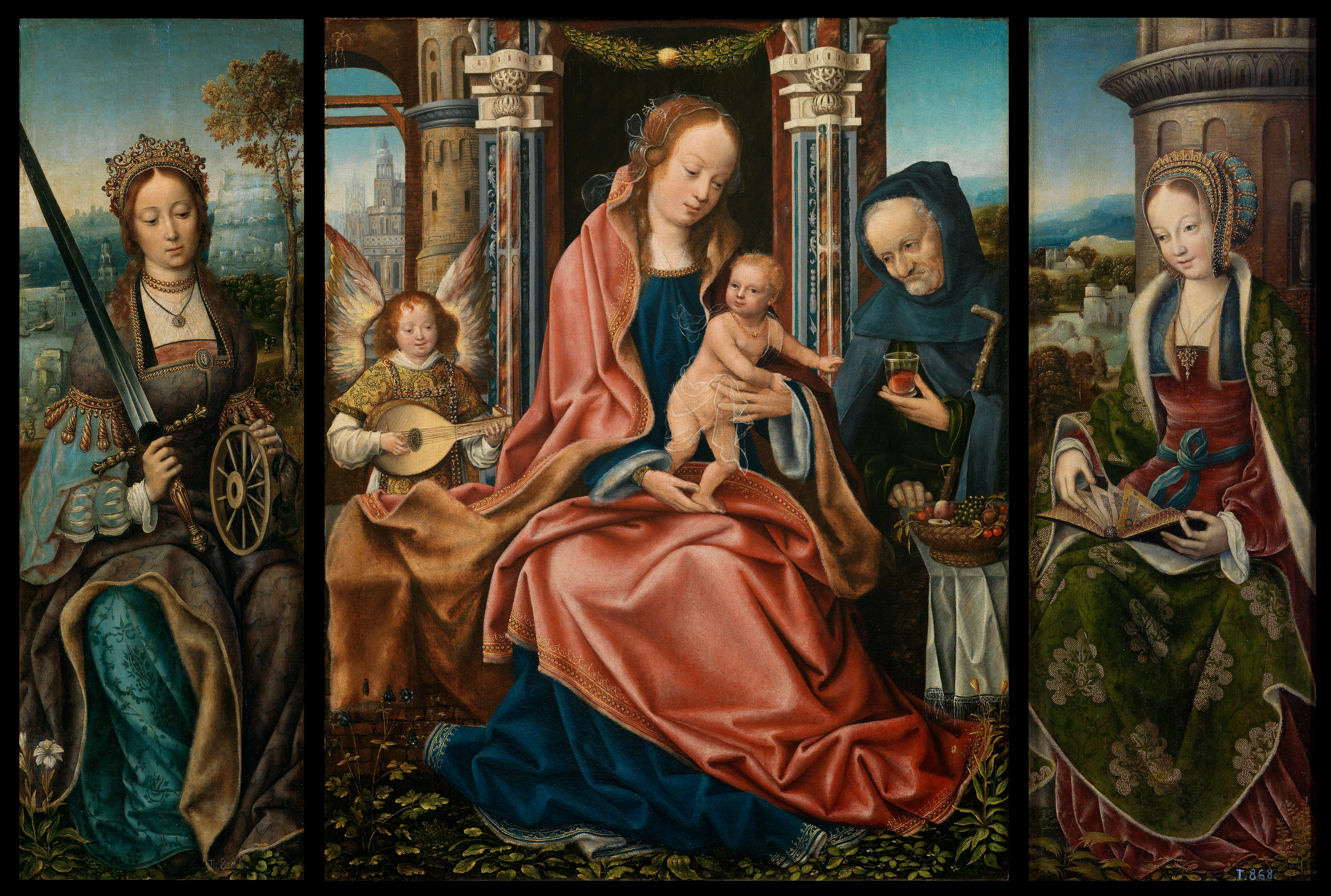
Master of Frankfurt (Maestro de Francfort), Sagrada Familia con ángel músico, Santa Catalina de Alejandría, Santa Bárbara, 1510–1520, Museo del Prado, Madrid. With the 2008 acquisition of the Holy Family (the central piece, formerly at the convento dominico de Santa Cruz in Segovia) the Prado completed the triptych by the Master of Frankfurt, separated since 1836.

His dated Self portrait of the artist with his wife in its original frame (1496; Royal Museum of Fine Arts, Antwerp) reveals that the artist was 36 years old at the time it was made, as well as a member of Antwerp's Guild of St. Luke.

If he is the same artist as Van Wueluwe, then he was also dean of the guild six times. Attributed paintings include his self-portrait, the Festival of the Archers (1493; Royal Museum of Fine Arts, Antwerp), and the two paintings in Frankfurt.

The Master of Frankfurt is also known for painting numerous copies after earlier Netherlandish painters such as Rogier van der Weyden and Hugo van der Goes for the open market and for developing, around 1500 in Antwerp, a new artistic style alongside his more famous contemporary Quentin Metsys.

== Museum collections ==
- Metropolitan Museum of Art, New York; Master of Frankfurt, The Adoration of the Christ Child, ca. 1496–1502
- Musée du Louvre, Paris; Master of Frankfurt, Vierge à l'Enfant dans un paysage, ca. 1514
- Thyssen-Bornemisza Museum, Madrid; Maestro of Frankfurt, La Sagrada Familia (The Holy Family), ca. 1508
- Museo National de Prado, Madrid; Maestro de Francfort, Sagrada Familia con ángel músico, Santa Catalina de Alejandría, Santa Bárbara, ca. 1510–1520 (Video: Restoration of the Master of Frankfurt triptych, by María Antonia López Asiaín)
- Detroit Institute of Arts, Michigan; Master of Frankfurt, The Virgin Enthroned
- Kunsthistorisches Museum, Vienna, Austria; Master of Frankfurt, Triptych, Adoration of the Magi, the Nativity (left) and the Circumcision (right), c. 1512
- Mauritshuis Royal Picture Gallery, The Hague; Meester van Frankfurt, Saint Christopher, ca. 1500, Saint Catherine, 1510–1520, and Saint Barbara, 1510–1520
- National Gallery of Art, Washington D.C.; Master of Frankfurt, Saint Anne with the Virgin and the Christ Child, ca. 1511–15
- Museu Nacional d'Art de Catalunya (MNAC), Barcelona; Mestre de Frankfurt, Triptych of the Baptism of Christ, 1500–1520
- National Museums Liverpool, Liverpool, UK; Master of Frankfurt, The Holy Family with Music Making Angels, 1510–1520
- Norton Museum of Art, West Palm Beach, Florida; Master of Frankfurt, The Lamentation
- San Diego Museum of Art, California; Master of Frankfurt, Mystic Marriage of Saint Catherine with Saints and Angles, ca. 1500–1510
- The Walters Art Museum, Maryland; Master of Frankfurt, Virgin and Child Enthroned, ca. 1515–1520
- The Wilanów Palace Museum (Muzeum Pałac w Wilanowie) Poland; Master of Frankfurt, Madonna and Child crowned by two angels, ca. 1490s
- Historical Museum (Historisches Museum), Frankfurt, Meister von Frankfurt, St. Anne Altarpiece, ca 1505, Two Saints: St. Odilia and St. Cecilia, ca. 1505
- The McNay Museum, San Antonio, Texas; Master of Frankfurt, St. Barbara and St. Catherine
- Queensland Art Gallery, Brisbane, Australia; Master of Frankfurt, Virgin and Child with Saint James the Pilgrim, Saint Catherine and the Donor with Saint Peter, ca. 1496

== Selected works ==
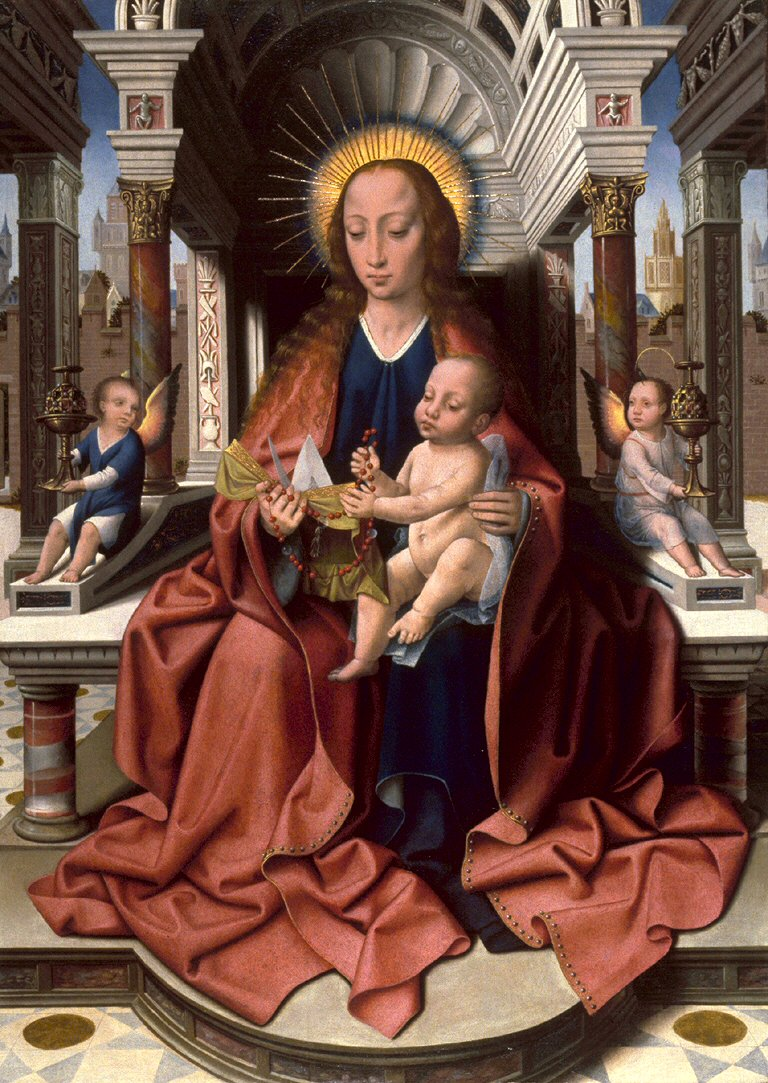
Attributed to the Master of Frankfurt, Virgin and Child Enthroned, ca. 1515–1520, oil on panel, 30 13/16 x 22 3/16 in. (78.3 x 56.3 cm), The Walters Art Museum

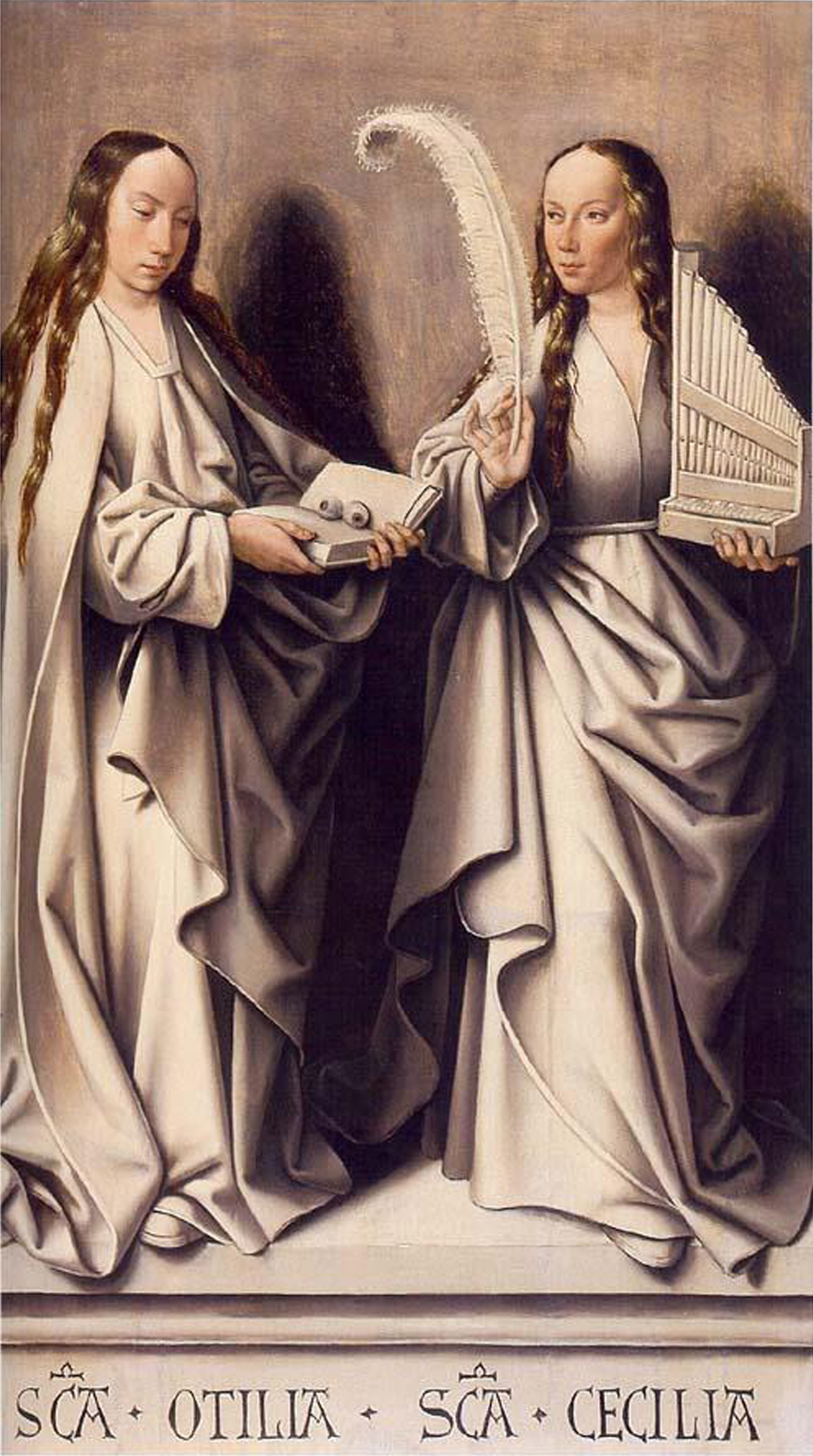
Master of Frankfurt, Saint Odile and Saint Cecilia, ca. 1503–1506, oil on panel, 113 x 67.9 cm (44 1/2 x 26 3/4 in.), Historical museum, Frankfurt. This painting, rendered in grisaille, forms part of the outer wings of the Altarpiece of St. Anne commissioned for the Dominican Church of Frankfurt circa 1504.

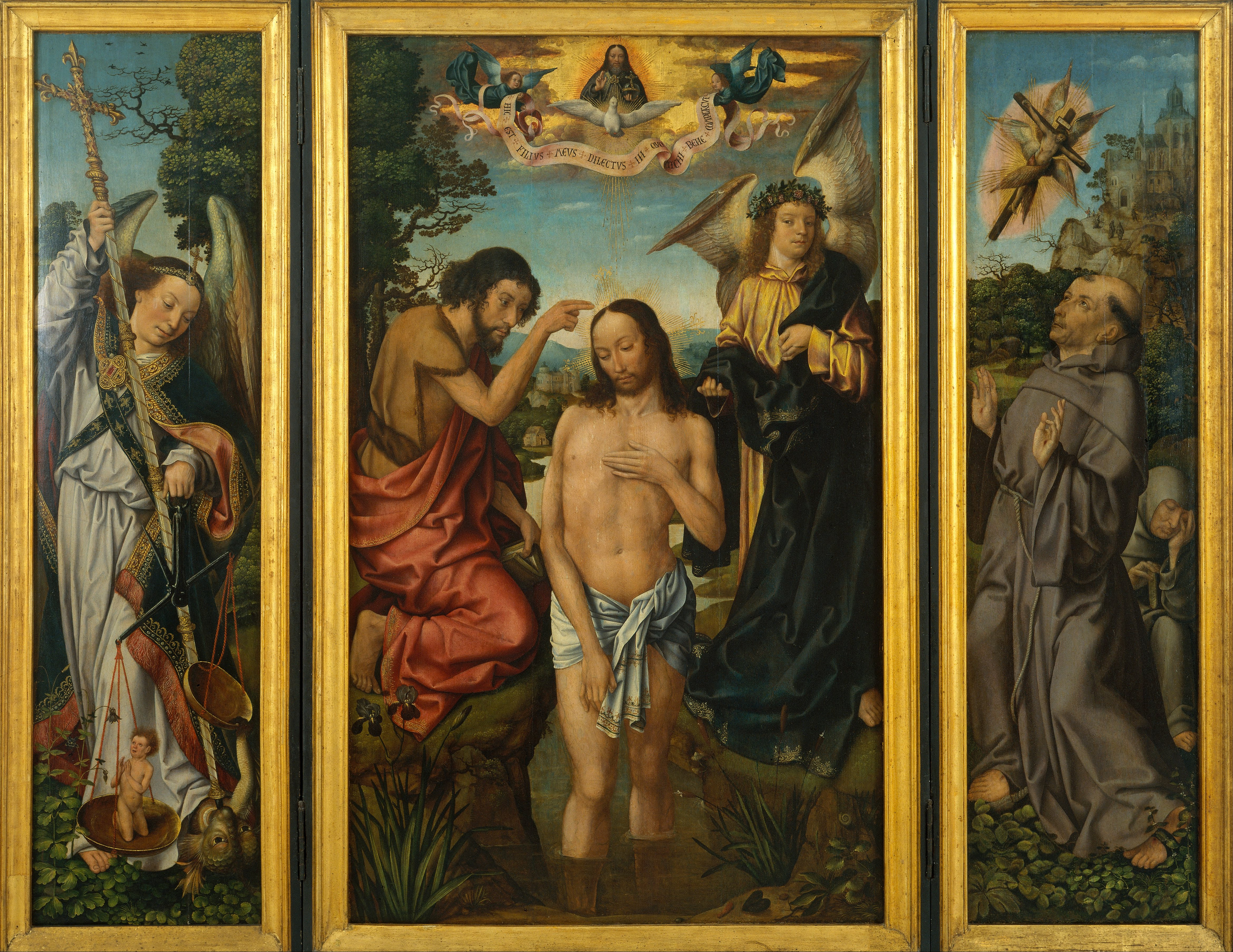
Master of Frankfurt, Triptych of the Baptism of Christ, Oil and gold leaf on wood, 169.2 x 213.5 x 5.5 cm, Museu Nacional d'Art de Catalunya, MNAC.

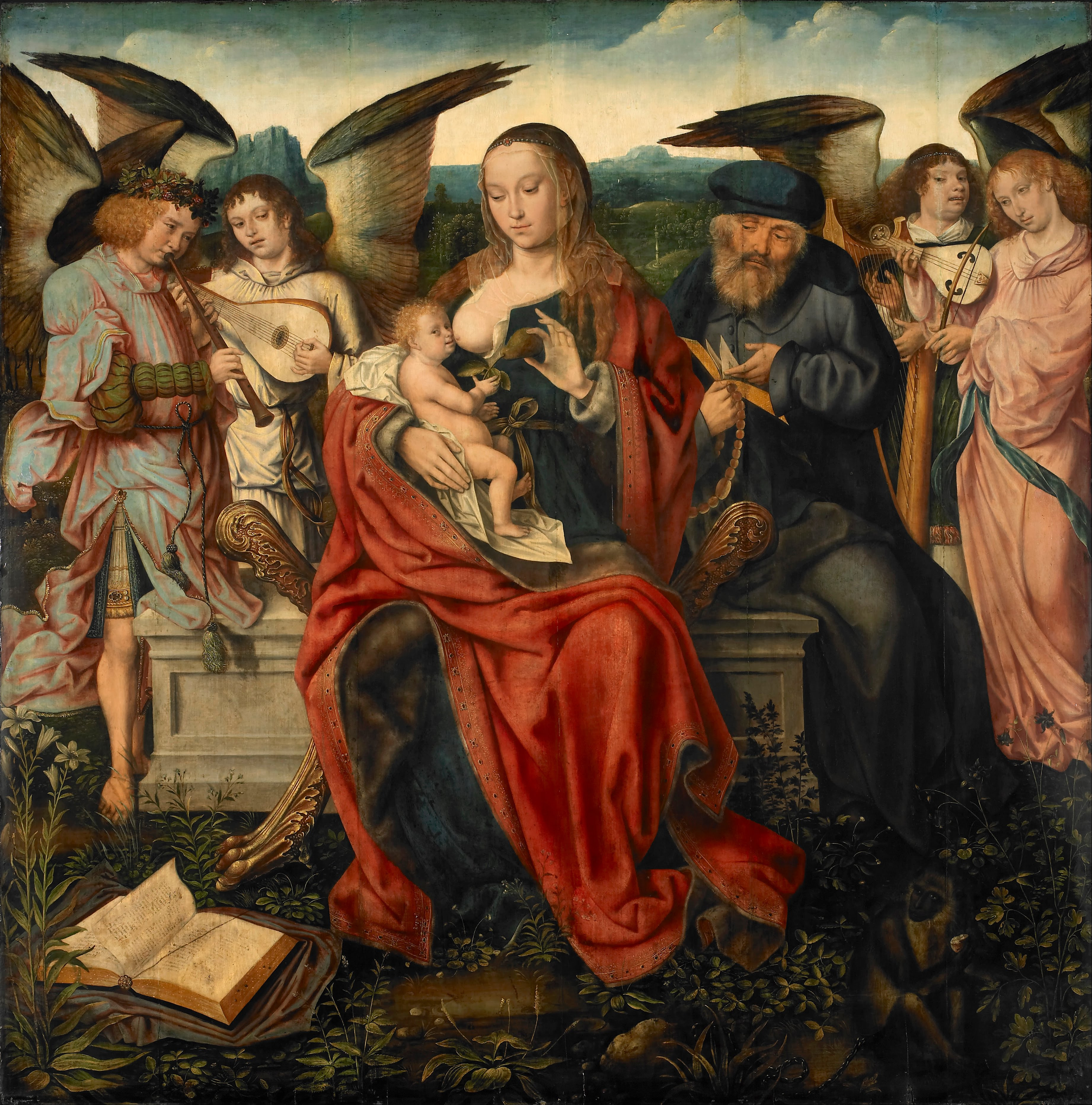
Attributed to the Master of Frankfurt, Holy Family with Music Making Angels, circa 1515, oil on panel, 156.2 cm × 155.9 cm (61.5 in × 61.4 in), Walker Art Gallery, Liverpool. This is the central panel of a triptych altarpiece. The two side panels depict two virgin martyrs, St Catherine and St Barbara (now in the Mauritshuis, The Hague).

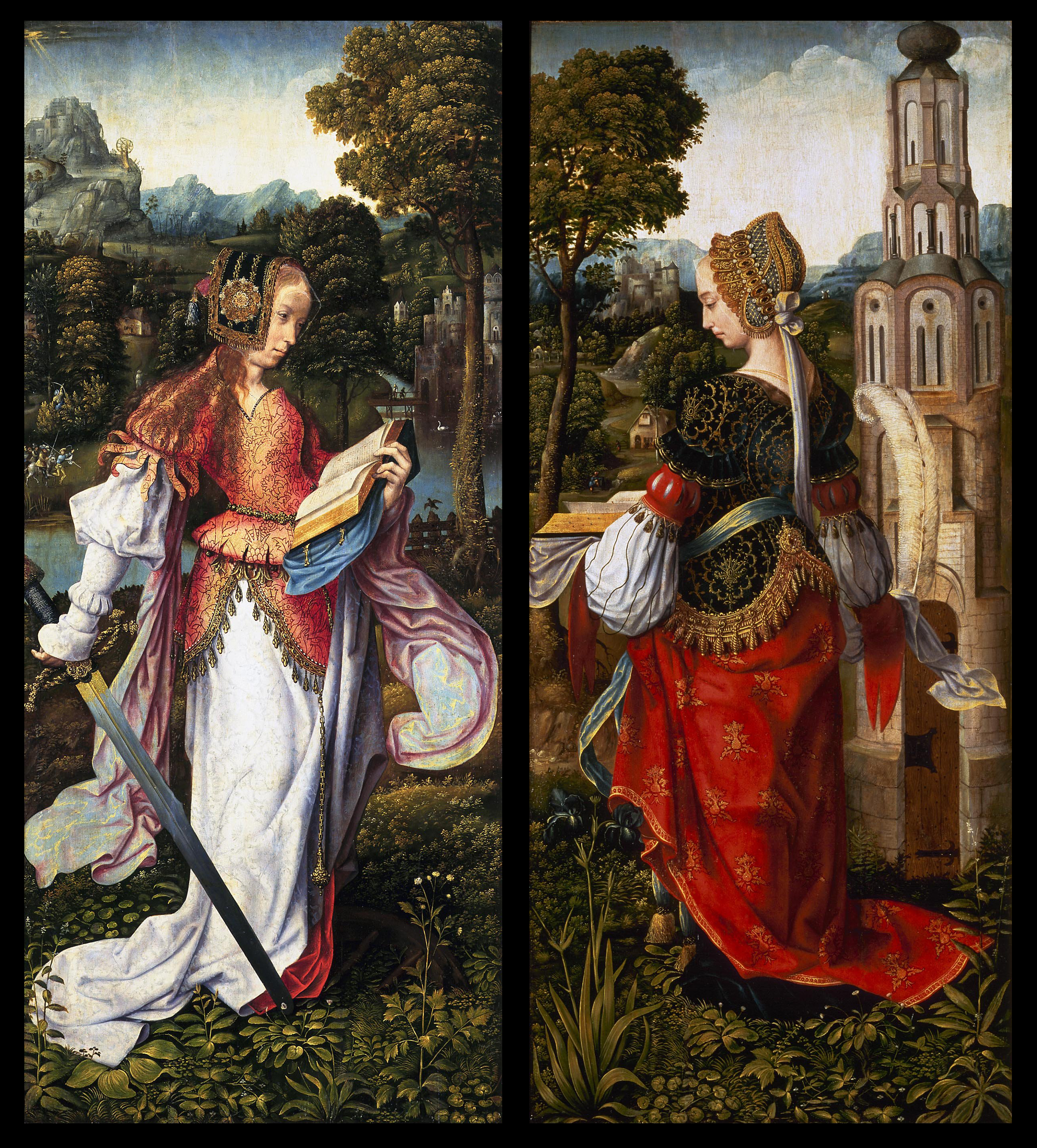
Master of Frankfurt, St Catherine, St Barbara, 1510–1520, oil on panel 158.7 x 70.8 cm (each), The Royal Picture Gallery Mauritshuis, The Hague. These are the left and right panels of a triptych altarpiece. The central panel depicts the Holy Family with Music Making Angels (now in the Walker Art Gallery, Liverpool).

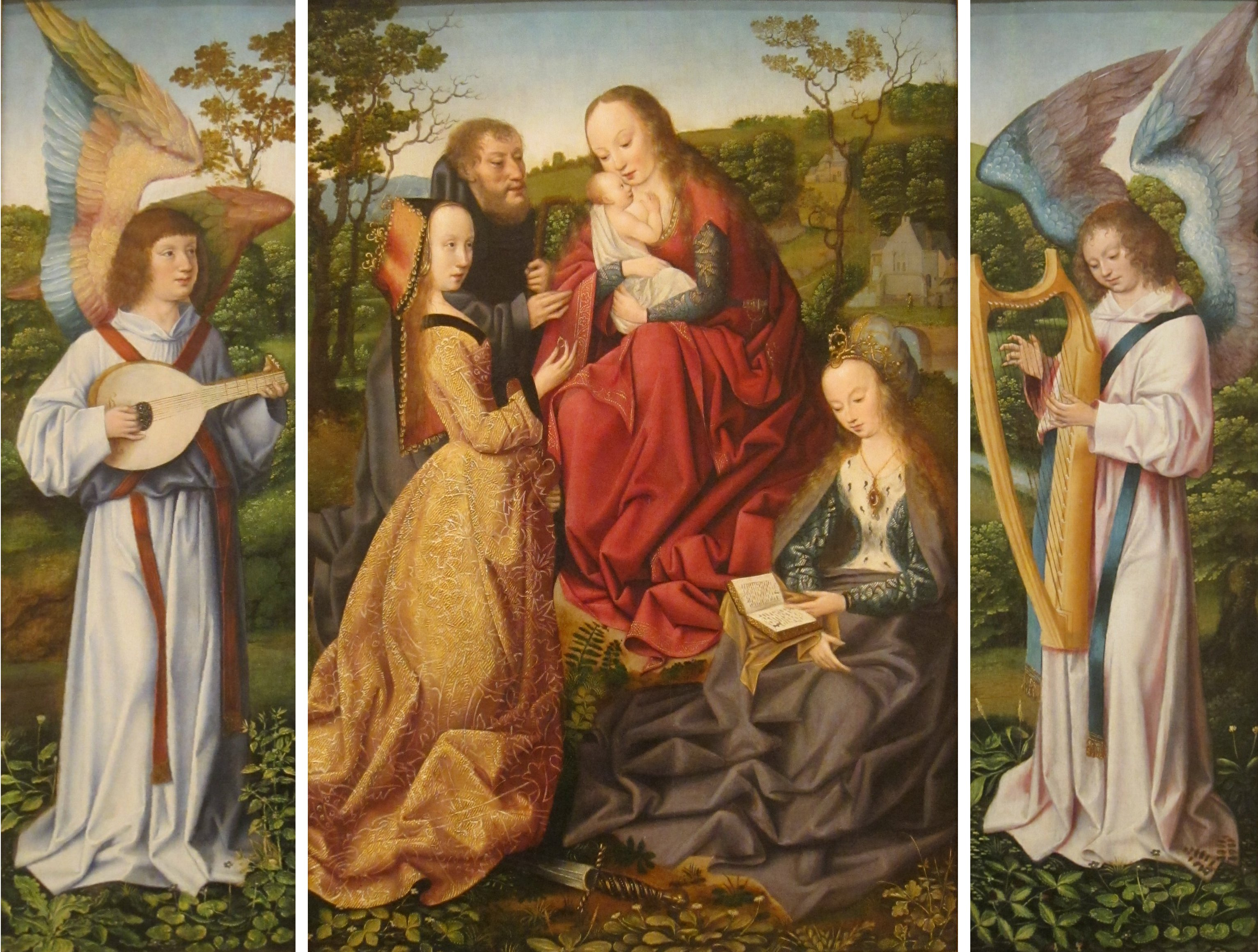
Master of Frankfurt, Mystic Marriage of Saint Catherine with Saints and Angles, ca. 1500–1510, oil on panel, 27 1/2 by 18 3/4 inches (70 cm × 48 cm), San Diego Museum of Art.

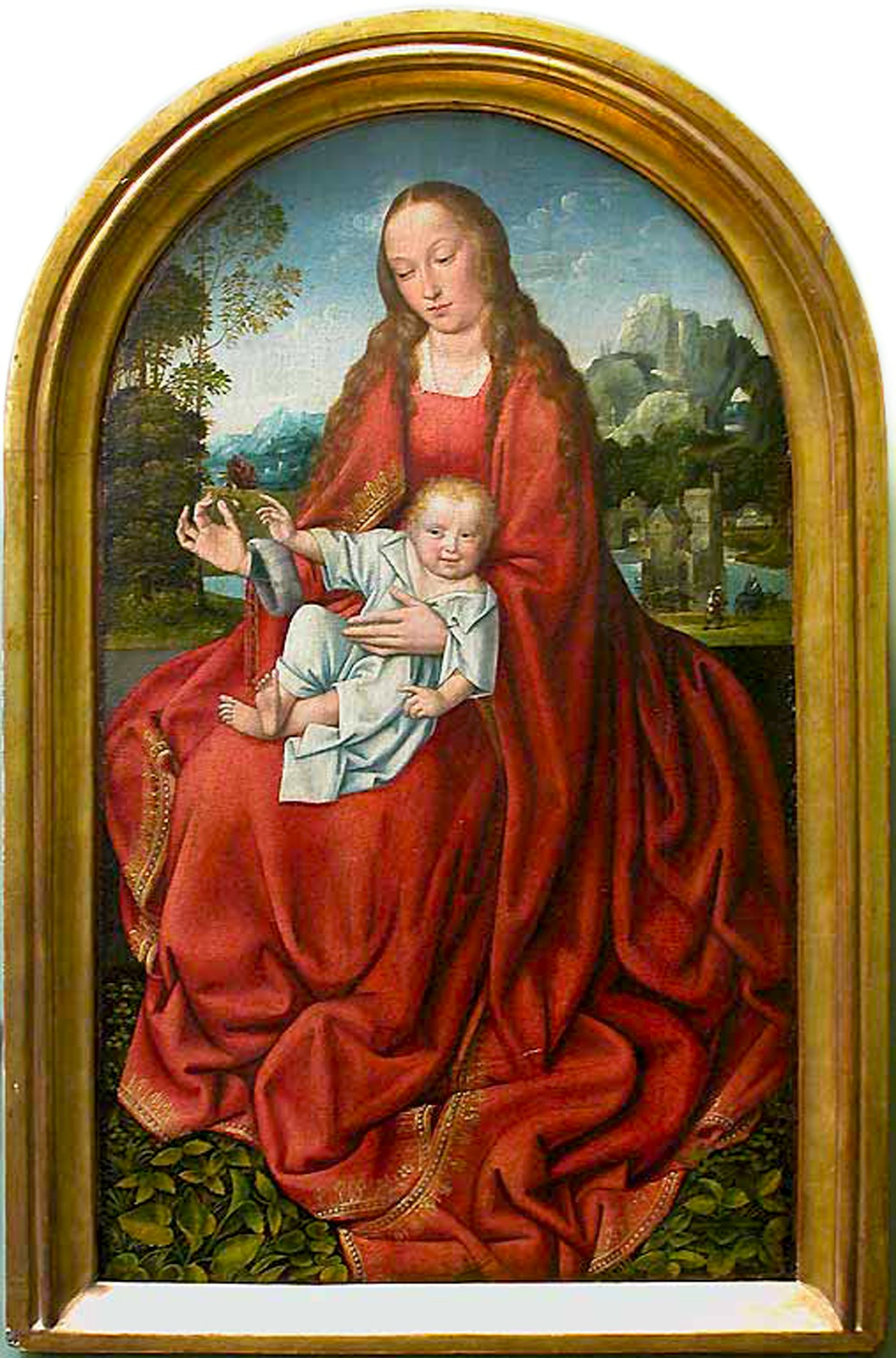
Master of Frankfurt (Maitre de Francfort), Vierge à l'Enfant dans un paysage , ca. 1514, 77 x 46 cm, Musée du Louvre, Paris

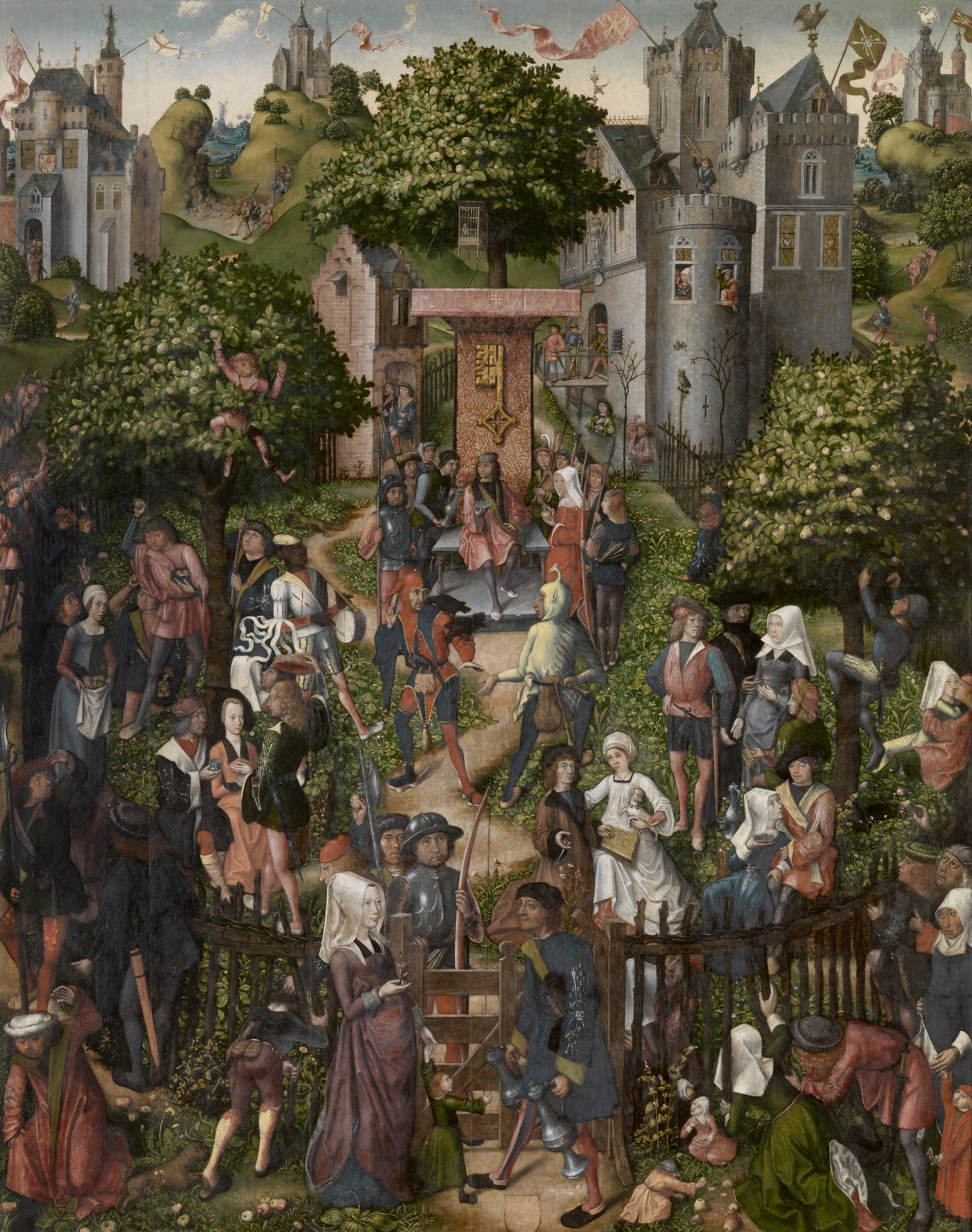
Master of Frankfurt, Festival of the Archers, 1493. Royal Museum of Fine Arts, Antwerp. This was painted for Antwerp's Guild of the Ancient Crossbow.

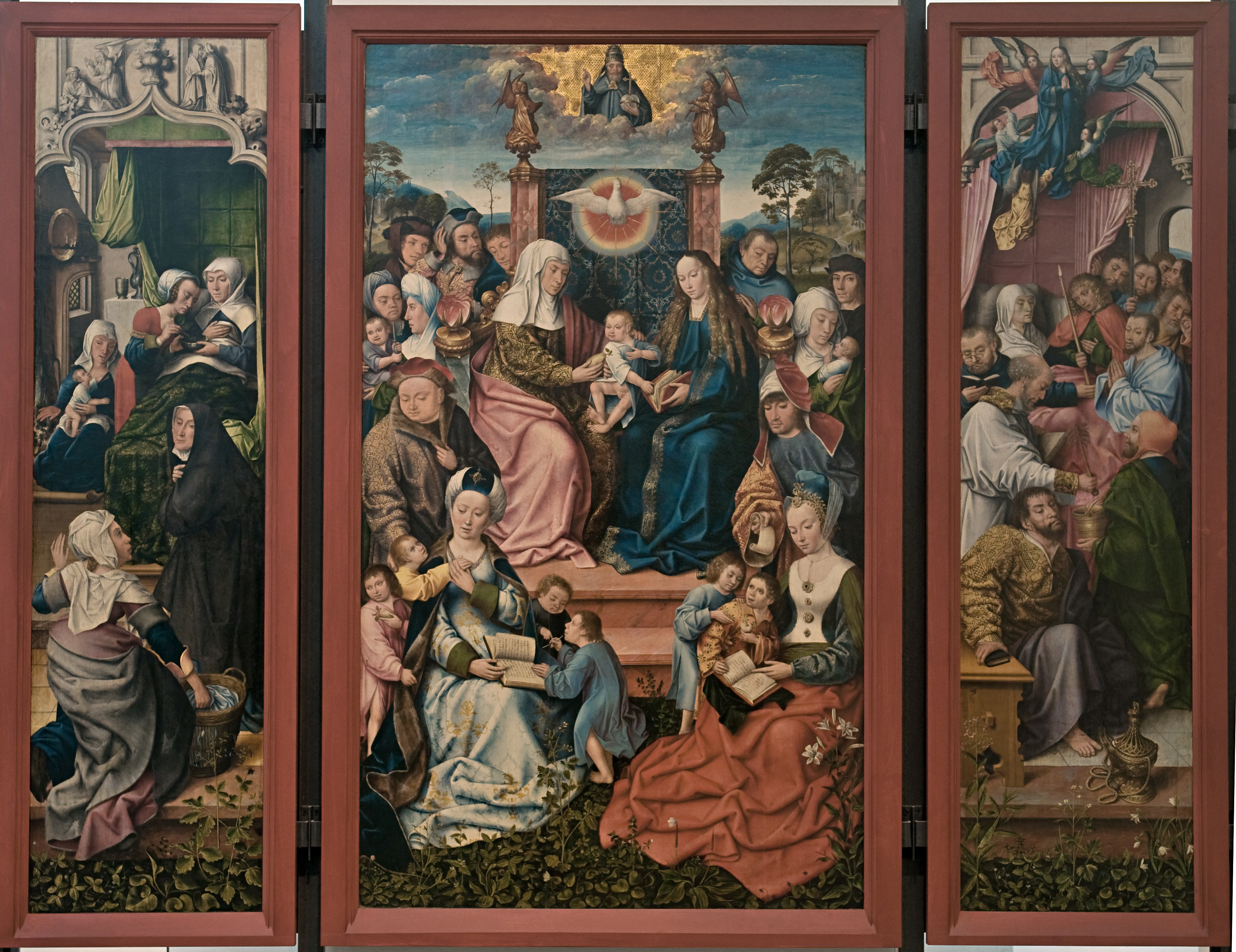
Master of Frankfurt, St. Anne Altarpiece, circa 1505, 126 cm × 212 cm (50 in × 83 in), Historical museum, Frankfurt. Created ca. 1505 for the Monastery of the Dominican Order in Frankfurt.

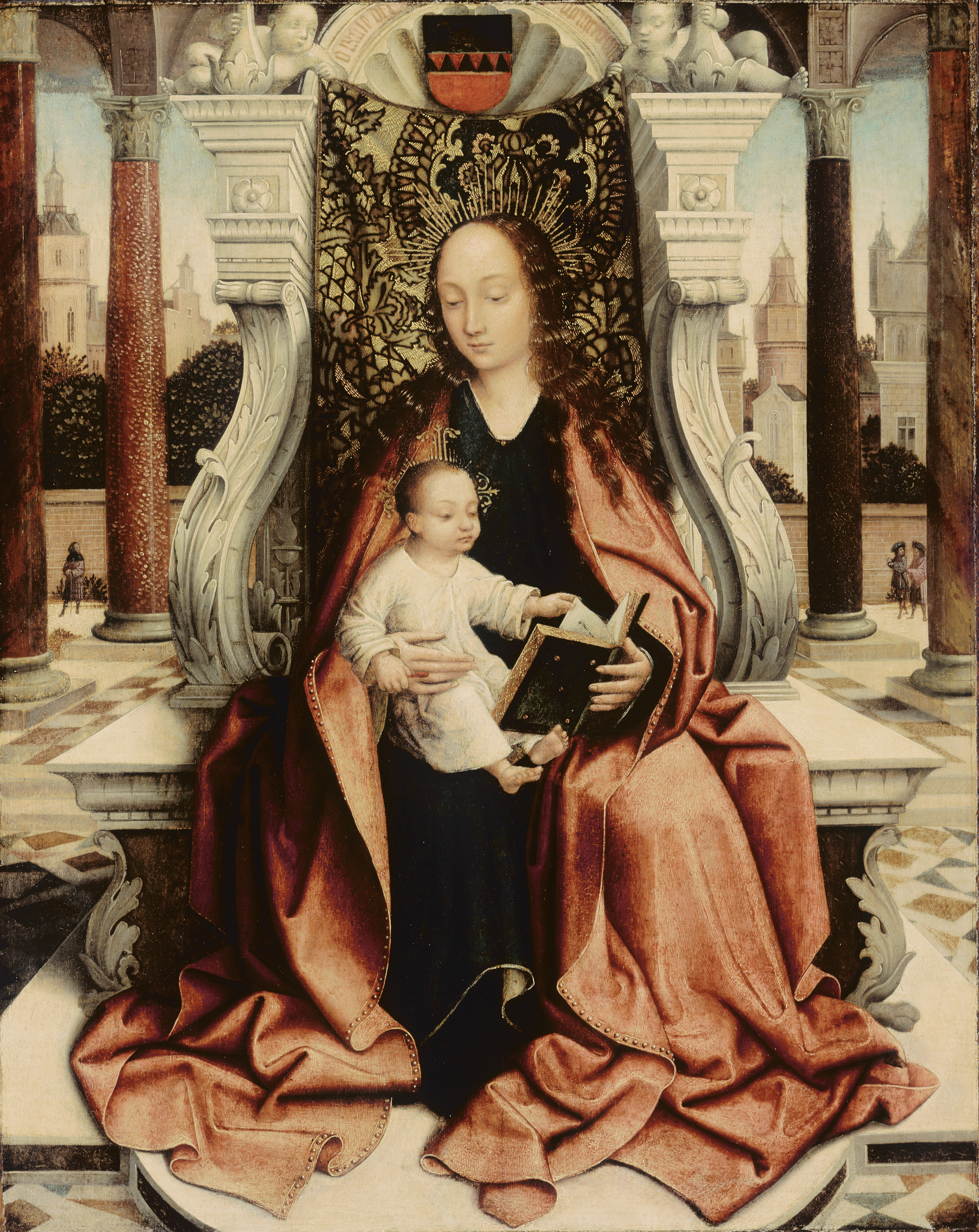
Master of Frankfurt, The Virgin Enthroned, oil on oak panel, 28 1/2 x 23 1/8 in. (72.4 x 58.7 cm), Detroit Institute of Arts, Detroit
