= H. W. Kent =

Australian art collector and sinologist

Herbert Wade Kent (1877 South Yarra – 1952 Preston) was a distinguished Australian collector of Chinese art. Having travelled to China and Japan working for steamship companies, he acquired an important collection of Chinese pieces, the best of which were Tang and Song ceramics. Returning to Melbourne in 1937, he arranged an exhibit of his Chinese collection at the National Gallery of Victoria, accompanied by lectures, and stimulating broader interest in East Asian art in Australia.

In 1938, he became the gallery's first curator of Oriental art. The NGV gallery of Asian art is named in his honour.
