= Australian poster collectives =

Art group

Australian poster collectives were artist collectives established in the late 1960s, 70s and 80s in the capital cities of Australia, largely led by women and focused on various forms of political activism.

There were also such collectives in the 1990s, such as RedPlanet.

== History and description ==
The collectives were formed mainly in Sydney, Melbourne, and Adelaide, but also in other Australian capital cities, during the period from approximately 1965 to the 1980s. The collectives were formed by artists concerned with social justice, women's rights, political activism, anti-Vietnam war protest, environmentalism, LGBT rights and Indigenous Australians' rights.

Collectives made posters for concerts, bands, marches and community groups. Feminists were active in the collectives and some were women-only collectives. Women were leaders in the poster collective movement, establishing groups, providing training, opening the groups up to other women and decision-making by consensus.

The collectives were considered to be democratic art movements outside the gallery systems, able to quickly reflect changing social and political views and challenge social norms by designing, printing and displaying posters in public areas. Some artists were members of more than one collective and often did not sign their name to posters but attributed them to the collective.

Similar collectives emerged in the UK, Europe, the US and Cuba during that time.

This article covers Australian poster collectives from the 60s to 80s rather than later collectives from the 1990s such as RedPlanet.

== Collections ==
Posters produced by the collectives are held in the National Library of Australia, National Gallery of Australia (NGA), Flinders University Museum of Art, Art Gallery of South Australia (AGSA), Art Gallery of NSW (AGNSW), Museum of Applied Arts and Sciences and Tin Sheds Gallery at the University of Sydney.

== Poster collectives and artists ==
Poster collectives were influential in developing the community arts movement and some of the collectives expanded into training workshops, community arts projects, community food co-operatives and other community support. Some artists within these collectives later worked in partnership with community arts groups and/or developed their own individual art practices and careers. The following list of poster collectives and artists is not exhaustive but shows the foundational influence of the collectives on the careers of some Australian contemporary and community artists.

By location, the poster collectives and their members included:

=== Sydney ===
- Earthworks Poster Collective (within the Tin Sheds Art Workshops at the University of Sydney) Artists: Marie McMahon, Chips Mackinolty, Jan Mackay, Toni Robertson, Colin Little, Mark Arbuz
- Lucifoil (within the Tin Sheds Art Workshops at the University of Sydney). The majority of artists were women. Artists: Pam Debenham, Leonie Lane, Yanni Stumbles, Jan Fieldsend, Cari Baldis, Sheona White, Angela Gee, Diane Paune, Pam Brown, Louise Dauth, Bernadette Krone, Ann Newmarch, Cathy Traill, Marie McMahon, Therese Kenyon, Jeff Stewart, Tony Stathakis, David Morrow, Graham Lightbody, Bob Clutterbuck
- The Women's Warehouse Screenprinting Collective. Artists: Marla Guppy and Anne Sheridan.
- Harridan Screenprinters. Artists: Marla Guppy and Anne Sheridan.
- Women's Domestic Needlework Group. Women-only, focused on doyleys, needlework and traditional sewing skills but printed 10 posters for an exhibition of doyleys and further posters for skills-exchange classes. Artists: Marie McMahon, Frances Phoenix.
- Social Fabric. (Screenprints on fabric rather than paper) Artists: Jan Mackay, Marie McMahon and Kathy Letray
- Garage Graphix (Mt Druitt, Western Sydney). Posters focused on picturing western Sydney in a positive way and Indigenous rights. The majority of members were women including Indigenous women. Artists: Maxine Conaty, Leeanne Donohoe, Marla Guppy, Alice Hinton-Bateup and Lin Mountstephen.
- Matilda Graphics. Women-only creative business collective. Artists: Frances Phoenix.
- Redback Graphix. Commercial graphic arts workshop rather than a collective but concerned with community issues, initially located at the Film and Drama Centre, Griffith University, Queensland, then moved to Wollongong, south of Sydney, then to Sydney. Artists: Michael Callaghan, Gregor Cullen, Alison Alder and Leonie Lane
- Boomalli Aboriginal Artists Co-Operative. Boomalli produces all kinds of artwork but its most well-known poster series "We have survived" was made for the 1988 anti-Bicentennial. Artists: Lin Onus, Karen Casey, Founders: Euphemia Bostock, Fiona Foley, Michael Riley, Tracey Moffatt, Jeffrey Samuels, Bronwyn Bancroft, Avril Quaill, Fern Martens, Arone Meeks and Brenda L. Croft.
- Women's Art Movement. Artists: Vivienne Binns, Frances Phoenix.
- B.U.G.A. U.P. (Billboard Utilising Graffiti Against Unhealthy Promotions) published posters/catalogues of its protest graffiti campaigns, some concerned with sexploitation in advertising but mainly focussed on antismoking and alcohol. The movement spread to most states besides NSW. Founders: Bill Snow, Rick Bolzan, Geoff Coleman.

=== Melbourne ===
- Jillposters. Women-only, also open to non-artists who wanted to make a statement through posters. Artists: Julia Church, Carole Wilson, Lesley Baxter, Ally Black, Linda Brassel, Zana Dare, Deej Fabyc, Maggie Fooke, Julie Higginbotham, Catriona Holyoake, Barbara Miles, Kate Reeves, Linda Rhodes, Julie Shiels, Lin Tobias, Julia Tobin, Kath Walters, Chaz and Karen.
- Dag Printing. Artists: Wendy Black, Angela Gee and Eveyln Vyhnal.
- Brunswick Work Co-Operative/Redletter Community Workshop. Artists: Bob Clutterbuck
- Another Planet Posters (formerly Community Access Screenprinting Project). The majority of artists were women. Artists: Julia Church, Kath Walters, Colin Russell
- Bloody Good Graphix/Graphics. Artists: Julia Church, Kath Walters

=== Canberra ===
- Megalo International Silkscreen Collective (Canberra, now Megalo Print Studio). Artists: Alison Alder (co-founder), Colin Little (co-founder)
- Acme Ink, screenprinting workshop at Gorman House Canberra. Artists: Julia Church, Mark Denton, Mandy Martin, Dianna Wells, Louise Saxton

=== Adelaide ===
- Anarchist Feminist Poster Collective. Some posters are held in the Flinders University Museum of Art. Artists: Sally O’Wheel and Megan Schlunke
- Women's Art Movement (WAM). Some posters are held in the Flinders University Museum of Art. Artists: Barbara Hanrahan, Fern Martins, Pamela Zeplin, Frances Phoenix.
- Community Media Association, later Co-Media Artists: Deborah Kelly, Jayne Amble, Pamela Harris, Kate Breakey, Kurwingie (Kerry Giles), Frances Phoenix (Budden)
- Community Association of Prospect (CAP) Poster Collective. Artists: Ann Newmarch, David Kerr, Kathy Muir, Peter Hollard, Z Ryan.

=== Brisbane ===
- Mantis Prints/Press. Women-only. Artists: Lyn Finch and Cherie Bradshaw.
- Redback Graphics/x. Started at Queensland Film and Drama Centre, Griffith University, Queensland. Co-ordinator: Margriet Bonnin. Artists: Michael Callaghan, Lyn Finch, Cherie Bradshaw, James Swan
- Black Banana Poster Collective. No community access, mainly political posters against Premier Joh Bjelke-Petersen's government. Artists: Ivan Nunn, Phyllis Patterson, Stephen Nothling and Robyn McDonald (later established Inkahoots).

=== Darwin, Katherine, Northern Territory ===
- Jalak Graphics. In the early 1980s, Chips Mackinolty of Earthworks moved to the Northern Territory to work with Aboriginal organisations. His poster imprint was Jalak Graphics which created posters for the Central and Northern Land Councils and other Aboriginal community organisations with designs by various artists and printing by the Sydney and Wollongong collectives. Artist: Chips Mackinolty, Lorna Fencer, Abie Jangala.
