= Lip (magazine) =

Australian interdisciplinary feminist art journal

Lip, A Feminist Arts Journal
- Staff writers: Suzanne Davies, Christine Johnston, Janine Burke, Isobel Davies, Elizabeth Gower, Freda Freiberg, Annette Blonski, Lesley Dumbrell, Suzanne Spunner, Meredith Rogers, Jeannette Fenelon (Kavanagh), Barbara Hall, Catherine Peake, and Elizabeth Owen
- Categories: Feminism; The arts; Politics; Culture; Current affairs
- Publisher: Suzanne Spunner
- First issue: 1976; 50 years ago
- Final issue Number: 1984; 42 years ago 9
- Company: Historical Feminist Arts Journal
- Country: Australia
- Based in: Carlton, Victoria
- Language: English
- Website: lipmag.com
- ISSN: 0313-4288

Lip, A Feminist Arts Journal, or just Lip, was an Australian interdisciplinary feminist art journal, published between 1976 and 1984. It was the first of its kind in Australia.

== Founding ==
The magazine and its related collective were founded in 1975 by Suzanne Spunner, who had been involved in the organising of the International Women's Film Festival. Nine issues were published, two of which were double issues. Spunner was also the founding member of the Home Cooking Theatre Company.

== Collective ==
The magazine was self-published by the feminist Lip collective during the era of the women's liberation movement. The Lip collective included Suzanne Davies, Christine Johnston, Janine Burke, Isobel Davies, Elizabeth Gower, Freda Freiberg, Annette Blonski, Lesley Dumbrell, Suzanne Spunner, Meredith Rogers, Jeannette Fenelon (Kavanagh), Barbara Hall, Catherine Peake, and Elizabeth Owen. The group also organised art shows, curated critical essays, and additionally published the Earthworks Poster Collective, The Women’s Theatre Group and The Women’s Film Group. They declared in its first issue that:

Lip is a collective of feminists who represent a wide range of political, social and cultural stances. We have come together through involvement in a number of feminist groups in Melbourne: Women's Film Festival; Women's Art Register; and Women's Theatre Group, to examine art and politics from a feminist perspective. Lip's fundamental concern is with the cultural conditions and lives of Australian women, in order to define and shape our national identity.

Desiring to make Lip "as accessible as possible" the collective espoused "non-hierarchical" involvement open to women to participate in production and to contribute content to the magazine. Those producing each issue derived its content from their own interests. Post-production evaluation meetings, the first on 16 October 1976 at the Melbourne Filmmakers Co-op., 352 Lygon St., were held for critical discussion and plan subsequent issues.

The fourth issue (combining 1978 and 1979 editions, following a combined issue 2&3 in 1977), was produced when the collective members were Annette Blonski, Janine Burke, Isabel Davies, Suzanne Davies, Lesley Dumbrell, Jeannette Fenelon, Freda Freiberg, Christine Johnston, Elizabeth Owen, Cathy Peake, Meredith Rogers, Suzanne Spunner, and Lynne Wilkinson. That edition was funded in June 1979 by the Visual Arts Board, the first federal or state support received by the collective, which previously had raised funds through donations, street stalls, sale of second-hand goods, and catering for the 1976 May Day march.

== Content ==
Lip's content included a very wide range of feminist positions and interdisciplinary art forms, in addition to work that connected the local scene to a more international network. The magazine was based in Carlton, Victoria.

The first issue contained a pink vaginal 'Soft-aggression centrefold' with paper doily pasted-in by hand by the collective, which was germane to other content: contributor to Judy Chicago's The Dinner Party (1974–1979) and archivist and historian of women's needlework, Frances Budden's 'A Note on Australian Embroidery'; and Janine Burke's review of the 1976 collaborative feminist art exhibition Experiments in Vitreous Enamels at Watters Gallery by artists Vivienne Binns, Marie McMahon, Toni Robertson, and Frances Budden.

Carole Ferrier wrote on feminist author and playwright Dorothy Hewett; painter Lesley Dumbrell introduced the Victorian Women's Art Register, Sylvie Leber profiled the Womens Theatre Group, and Carolyn Howard, the Women's Film Group; interviews included were with painter Jennifer Talbot, silversmith Belinda Coulstock, American first-generation conceptual artist Adrian Piper, and Sue Johnston, Claudia Wright, Suzanne Spunner interviewed filmmaker Anne Severson, while French film director and writer, Marguerite Duras was interviewed by Sue Johnston; photographs by Christine Godden were discussed by Meredith Rogers; Ann Stephen using a "process of de-neutralizing" reviewed three Sydney art exhibitions; on film, Suzanne Spunner contributed 'Towards a feminist critique of cinema' and 'Feminist film criticism practised–a review of Molly Haskell's "From Reverence to Rape..."' on women in cinema; Folly Gleeson wrote 'Archetypal Frenchman chooses: The Mother and the Whore"'; Mary Callaghan contributed 'Exorcising Jack Nicholson: 'One Flew over the Cuckoo's Nest'"; and Sophie Neef considered 'Sex-role stereotyping on television'.

== Re-publication ==
In 2013 Vivian Ziherl published an anthology of Lip articles.

== Bibliography ==
- The Lip Anthology, Vivian Ziherl (ed.), Kunstverein Publishing, Macmillan Art Publishing, 2013
