= Ann Newmarch =

Australian artist (1945-2022)

Ann Foster Newmarch (9 June 1945 – 13 January 2022) OAM, known as "Annie", was a South Australian painter, printmaker, sculptor and academic, with an international reputation, known for her community service to art, social activism and feminism. She co-founded the Progressive Art Movement and the Women's Art Movement (WAM) in Adelaide, and is especially known for her iconic 1978 colour screenprint piece titled Women Hold Up Half the Sky!.

== Early life and education ==
Ann Foster Newmarch was born on 9 June 1945 in Adelaide, South Australia.

She graduated with a teaching diploma from the Western Teachers College in 1966 after three years' attendance there, after which she studied philosophy and psychology at Flinders University in Adelaide for a year.

She spent 1968 teaching art, at Croydon and Mitcham Girls High Schools, and became a lecturer at the South Australian School of Art in 1969, continuing there until 2000. (Note: Conflicting sources give different explanations, but assume the CV version is correct as it would have been approved by her. An earlier version of this article says "She went on to attend the South Australian School of Art in Adelaide. When she graduated from this school, she became one of the few women to serve as an instructor there in 1969.")

In 1973 to 1974 Newmarch continued to study philosophy, and also took subjects such as women's studies and politics and art at Flinders, as she evolved into an overtly political artist.

== Career ==
Newmarch was one of the first female teachers at the South Australian School of Art, and was the first woman to be the subject of a retrospective exhibition at the Art Gallery of South Australia in 1997, The Personal is Political. She lived and worked in the inner-northern suburb of Prospect for around 50 years, working at her studio in Beatrice Street. She was the first person to be appointed artist-in-residence with City of Prospect.

In 1969 she held her first solo exhibition at the Robert Bolton Gallery in Adelaide, but criticised commercial galleries for being dominated by male artists and driven by the market.

Her striking image entitled Women Hold Up Half the Sky! (1978) had a huge impact on both her career and other artists, and is the most well-known of all her works. At the end of 1978, she started running screen-printing workshops Prospect studio, and also founded the Prospect Mural Group in that year.

In 1980, after a trip to the US and UK, Newmarch and other members of WAM painted Reclaim the Night for the Adelaide Festival of Arts, featuring women staging a street protest along with word art. She was the initiator of Stobie pole art in 1983, a practice which continues today.

In 1988, upon being invited to China along with Anne Morris on a Sino-Australian cultural exchange, the two Australian artists worked with four Chinese artists on a series of large murals in Xianyang, in Shaanxi province.

When she turned 50 in 1995, Newmarch shaved her head and painted copies of paintings by well-known male artists on it.

== Art practice ==
Newmarch's work is extensive and she did not hold to an individualistic prescriptive signature style. She was introduced to the women's movement in 1970 and balanced teaching, mothering and artmaking with community and cultural development work. She worked in painting, printmaking, and sculpture, but was especially known her experimental printmaking practice, sometimes using personal imagery to make social and political points about the role of women in society.

Her art practice was concerned with the gendered basis of the world and is a practitioner whose work critiques underlying assumptions around understandings of gender. Embracing feminism from the early 1970s, her art practice highlights that all representation is political and the absence of voice is in itself an acceptance of the status quo. Her early work heavily featured silkscreen printing, a relatively cheap and accessible form of art, and one at which she excelled.

Later, in the 1990s, her work included more sculptural objects, and after that she focused on the objects being the subjects, allowing hands and the body to become canvases for the exploration of artmaking.

Her work has been described as political, feminist, emotional, personal, and complex. Her art practice epitomised "the personal is political", and included representations of women's unseen labour, motherhood, and other women's issues. In an article in Lip: A Feminist Arts Journal (1981), Newmarch wrote that with her work she aimed to reach "women who are oppressed by sexism and people who are exploited by capitalism", and that her work was not aimed at "an 'elite educated' art gallery audience who can afford to ‘invest’ in art".

She later wrote:

Art should be made out of personal experience not out of "art" concerns. Personal experience is only a useful source of art when it is accompanied by an understanding of the social conditions in which it arises. An artist has a responsibility as an image make to concerns wider than herself or her art.

=== Women Hold Up Half the Sky! ===
Newmarch's most well-known work, Women Hold Up Half the Sky! (1978) is a colour screenprint based on a photograph created in 1978, was so titled as a play on the phrase "Women hold up half the sky" made by former Chinese Communist Party chairman Mao Zedong.

Originally designed as a poster, it shows a photo of a middle-aged woman carrying a man in her arms, with the words written at the bottom. The woman in the photo was her Aunt Peggy, a single mother who raised eight children, and by the time of the artwork, had 23 grandchildren and seven great‑grandchildren. She much admired by Newmarch, seeing her as someone who lived an unconventional and feminist lifestyle, having mostly built a house on her own, learning the work usually done by tradespeople and doing it herself. The tiny 1940s snapshot on which the screenprint was based was "a little summer picture of something [Peggy] had done for a dare when a whole lot of people at a party had said ‘I bet you couldn’t lift your husband up’". Newmarch's work, which included adding Mao's famous quote, turned it into an empowering image for women. In it, she aimed to "show the strong encouraging aspects of women", in contrast to her earlier work focussing more on suburban alienation, and criticism of images of women in advertising.

Newmarch said of the work "It was never intended as an art image, it was intended as a confirming, joyful, cheap available poster"; however, it has had a huge impact, being exhibited all over Australia and the world.

== Political activism ==
Newmarch had a huge interest in politics, which always played a role in her work. Her work was infused with her social, political and environmental concerns, which included Aboriginal land rights. She was a significant figure in Adelaide's Women's Art Movement (WAM), founded on 7 August 1976.

In 1974 Newmarch was co-founder, with philosopher Brian Medlin, of the Progressive Art Movement (PAM), which focused on political issues, social concerns, and education. It arose from a course at Flinders University called Politics and Art, and was inspired by Marxist Leninist theory. The group included students, writers, artists, filmmakers, and poets among its membership. Other artists associated with PAM included Robert Boynes, Mandy Martin Margaret Dodd, Bert Flugelman, and Ken Searle.

== Recognition and awards ==
- In 1989 Newmarch was awarded a Medal of the Order of Australia (OAM) for her services to the arts.
- On 22 September 2010, she was awarded the Australia Day Award for her photograph piece titled Women Hold Up Half the Sky, a production that shows how amazingly strong women are. The piece was a tribute to her Auntie Peg who built a house on her own while raising eight children and working two jobs, and was recreated as a postcard for four major galleries.
- In October 2019, the City of Prospect renamed their community gallery (formerly the Prospect Gallery) the Newmarch Gallery, to honour her long involvement with community arts at the Community Association of Prospect and the Prospect Mural Group.
- In December 2019, Newmarch was "Highly Commended" in the Geoff Crowhurst Memorial Award category at the South Australian Ruby Awards.

=== For individual works ===
- Women Hold Up Half the Sky! (1978)
  - A major exhibition mounted by the National Gallery of Australia in 1995 was given its title, Women Hold Up Half the Sky, by Newmarch's print.
  - 2007: the only Australian work selected for the Museum of Contemporary Art Los Angeles' exhibition WACK! Art and the Feminist Revolution
  - 2020–21: included in the Know my Name exhibition at the National Gallery of Australia

== Death and legacy ==
Newmarch died peacefully on Thursday 13 January 2022. She was survived by her three children: Jake Newmarch, Bruno Medlin and Jessie Kerr.

She left a rich legacy of artwork, as well as raising awareness of many issues, and founding the Progressive Art Movement and mentoring many women artists. An obituary in ARTnews, an American visual arts magazine based in New York City, said that she had "reshaped the Australian art scene as an educator and activist".

In February 2022 Sydney artist Vivienne Binns called Newmarch a "giant", to whom she had yet to pay proper tribute.

Women Hold Up Half the Sky! became an icon of the feminist movement in Australia.

Stobie poles continue to be decorated in Adelaide.

== Exhibitions ==
Newmarch's work was displayed in numerous galleries around Adelaide, including Greenaway Art Gallery (1994, 1995, 1996, 2001) and Prospect Gallery (1992, 1999, 2003, 2006, 2007, 2009).

The works Suburban window (1973) and Three months of interrupted work (1977), were included in significant feminist exhibitions, such as A Room of One’s Own (Melbourne, 1974) and The Women's Show (Adelaide, 1977).

Other notable exhibitions include:

- As the Serpent Struggles, first held at the Experimental Art Foundation in 1987 and subsequently elsewhere
- The Personal is Political, first and major retrospective, at AGSA, 1997
- Anticipation, JamFactory Atrium and Prospect Gallery, 2005 to 2007
- WACK! Art and the Feminist Revolution at the Museum of Contemporary Art Los Angeles, 2007
- Survey exhibition at the Northern Centre for Contemporary Art in Darwin, Northern Territory, 2017

== Collections ==
Newmarch's artworks are held in all state galleries, including more than 40 works held by the Art Gallery of South Australia, as well as in major private collections.

Major collections holding her work include:

- Art Gallery of South Australia
- Art Gallery of New South Wales
- Australian War Museum
- Ballarat Fine Art Gallery
- Bendigo Art Gallery
- Luilichang Cultural Trust, Beijing, China
- City of Hamilton Art Gallery
- Flinders University Art Museum
- Griffith University
- Naracoorte Art Gallery
- National Gallery of Australia
- National Gallery of Victoria
- Newcastle Art Gallery
- Queen Victoria Museum and Art Gallery, Launceston, Tasmania
- Queensland Institute of Technology
- Riddoch Art Gallery, Mount Gambier
- SA Dept of the Premier and Cabinet
- University of Canberra
- University Art Museum, University of Queensland
- University of South Australia Art Museum, Adelaide
- University of Tasmania, Hobart
- Warrnambool Art Gallery
