= Women's Domestic Needlework Group =

Australian artist collective

The Women's Domestic Needlework Group was established in 1976 by Australian feminist artists Marie McMahon and Frances Phoenix, members of the Sydney branch of the Women's Art Movement, with an interest in reclaiming and focusing attention on the undervalued field of women's traditional craft work. The other members of the collective were Joan Grounds, Bernadette Krone, Kathy Letray, Patricia McDonald, Noela Taylor and Loretta Vieceli.

== Artworks and exhibitions ==
Phoenix and McMahon collected d'oyleys from second-hand shops and donations, and began running weekly workshops, open to the general public, initially at the Tin Sheds and then at the South Sydney Women's Centre. Their goal was to share and learn such skills as crochet, embroidery, lacemaking and weaving. After obtaining Crafts Council funding, their major exhibition, The D'Oyley Show, An Exhibition of Women's Domestic Fancywork, was held at Watters Gallery, Sydney, in October 1979. It then toured regional New South Wales galleries in 1980. The group collaborated with Earthworks Poster Collective to produce a series of screenprints about women's needlework, which served as wall panels for the exhibition. Examples of the posters are in the collection of the Art Gallery of New South Wales and the National Gallery of Victoria.

The group sought to counteract ingrained attitudes in education that positioned craft as a minor art. Needlework was strategically chosen to reflect the traditional patterns, symbols and images that have reoccurred throughout history, and the common techniques that many women would relate to. The traditional forms, techniques and patterns of d'oyley work displayed in the exhibition included: Teneriffe lace wheels; Rose and Shamrock pattern; Latin American 'Sol' lacework; continuous braid lace; filet crochet; spinning star pattern; embroidery with crochet edge; flora and fauna designs; ecru cushion covers; sandwich d'oyleys and jug covers; scalloped d'oyleys; snow crystal pattern; crochet and knotting; limerick lace; Italian 'Punto Tagliato' lacework; petit point; and applique.

As Australian writer and journalist Anne Summers argues in the exhibition catalogue, "It is only at this (level) of culture - everyday life - that women have an explicit and acknowledged place." As well as documenting the works in the exhibition, the extensive exhibition catalogue included research and practical information on Aboriginal crafts, Australian Designs and Designers 1890 - 1940, historical exhibitions and competitions, poetry, histories of women's labour in the textile industry (European and Australian), the development of craft guilds, and caring for textiles.

The exhibition, Dissenting D'oyleys: The Women's Domestic Needlework Group, exhibited ten of the original screenprinted posters, and was shown at the New England Regional Art Gallery, Armidale, New South Wales, in 2021.
