= Mandy Martin =

Australian artist (1952–2021)

- Born: 18 November 1952; Adelaide, South Australia
- Died: 10 July 2021 (aged 68); Orange, New South Wales, Australia
- Education: South Australia School of Art
- Notable work: Red Ochre Cove, 1987
- Website: www.mandymartinartist.com

Amanda Laura de Rose (Mandy) Martin (18 November 1952 – 10 July 2021) was an Australian painter, printmaker, feminist, and environmentalist. She was involved in the development of feminist art in Australia, as well as in supporting climate change action. Based in Canberra, she was also a lecturer at the Australian National University (ANU) School of Art (1978-2003), and an adjunct professor at the Fenner School of Environment and Society at the ANU College of Medicine, Biology and Environment. She exhibited widely in Australia and internationally, including the National Gallery of Australia and the Guggenheim Museum.

== Early career ==
Born in Adelaide, South Australia in 1952, Martin attended Presbyterian Girls' College (now Seymour College), which did not offer art classes at the time. Martin completed her arts training at the South Australian School of Art (1972–1975). She exhibited her works on paper, including strongly politically-motivated posters (produced as limited edition prints). As her concepts developed, Martin explored the medium of oil paint.

Martin made her mark early in her career in the 1975 exhibition, Fantasy and Reality, organised by the Women's Art Movement at the University of Sydney with Jude Adams, Frances Budden and Toni Robertson. In 1976, Martin was part of a group exhibition celebrating the United States Bicentennial in the small group exhibition, America As We See It, at the Hogarth Galleries in Sydney, showing alongside Brett Whiteley and Ann Newmarch.

Martin had initially pursued her creative expression through producing works on paper. Even though her work had long been about making social commentary, an exhibition of her prints on paper in 1977 examined her restrained interpretation of the subjects of corruption in big business and the exploitation of workers. This exhibition could be seen as a pivotal point in her career, as Martin transferred her method of expression through prints and posters to other art mediums, importantly painting with oils. The art critic, Sasha Grishin, admired her drawing but hoped the artist would find a less literal way of expressing her ideas. There was a resurgence of interest in poster art in the last 1980s, and Martin's early poster work was included in an exhibition at Australian Girls Own Gallery (aGOG) in Canberra as the issues dealt with in the mid-1970s had not changed.

== Mid-career ==
Martin was working and exhibiting in a rapidly changing city. In 1978, James Mollison, director of the soon-to-be-opened National Gallery of Australia (NGA), was purchasing works, described as 'unconventional', for the fast growing national collection, and acquired a number of her prints. Martin also sold her feminist-themed, anti-Vietnam posters directly to the Australian War Memorial. Despite having to juggle her teaching and creating art, she would benefit from the increase in interest in Canberra-based artists and the stimulus to the art market that could reasonably be expected to accompany the build-up to the opening of the NGA in 1981.

In 1980, she had her first major exhibition of oil paintings on canvas at the Solander Gallery in Canberra. The Canberra Times art critic, Sasha Grishin, praised her use of "thick, well-worked painterly and textured masses" and thought Martin creatively realised "her own sense of social imagery". On the other hand, reviewing a 2022-2023 exhibition at the Geelong Art Gallery in The Australian, critic, Christophe Allen, described Martin's "handling of oil painting [as] clumsy and without any refinement or subtlety. ... the paint application is brutal and yet inexpressive."

In 1992, Martin exhibited at the Ben Grady Gallery in Canberra in the exhibition Reconstructed narrative: Strzelecki Desert, Homage to Ludwig Becker "exploring the impact of man on the environment'. Martin retraced the footsteps of Becker through a series of industrial landscapes, a subject matter she had been increasingly exploring and was to become a recurrent theme in her work.

Although not the winner of the 1982 Canberra Times Art Awards, Martin's stand-out work, Factory 2, was acquired by the National Gallery of Victoria. The then director, Patrick McCaughey, described the work as a "grim and impressive landscape".

Martin exhibited regularly, often with fellow lecturers at the School of Art in Canberra. Her work was described as "flowing textured paintings and prints", and the local art critic found "boundless energy" in her dark industrial landscapes. By 1985, her work was considered to have achieved drama and maturity.

== Achieving recognition ==
=== Red Ochre Cove ===
Another milestone in Canberra's history was to impact on Martin's professional artistic standing. Martin was commissioned to create a large painting, Red Ochre Cove, which when completed was 2.8 by 12.1 metres (9.2 ft × 39.7 ft), and was to be installed in the Main Committee Rooms in the new Australian Parliament House in 1988. The work was in response to Tom Roberts' monumental painting of the opening of Federal Parliament in Melbourne in 1901, which in those days was hung in the High Court. Red Ochre Cove was reputed to be the largest work ever commissioned in Australia. Martin worked in an old cow shed in the rustic Canberra suburb of Pialligo where she relied on scaffolding to create her large triptych. She described the painting "as an Australian coastal landscape set in an industrial timespan". Martin said she was "thrilled she was selected by the Parliament House Construction Authority", praising it for "its entrepreneurial attitude in commissioning works by younger and less established artists and obtaining works that suited the concept of the building, rather than staying solely with the more established names".

Prior to the opening in May 1988, Martin was also invited to contribute work to a major exhibition of works from the new Australian Parliament House art collection. Art and Architecture was held at the Canberra Contemporary Art Space and Martin showed her work alongside internationally recognised Australian artists such as Sidney Nolan, Arthur Boyd, Fred Williams, Robert Klippel and Imants Tillers.

1988 continued to be an important year for Martin. In August she exhibited drawings at the University Drill Hall Gallery at the Australian National University. Again her work attracted the attention of art critic Sasha Grishin. Overall he described the exhibition as being of an "outstanding calibre" and Martin was included in high praise for the drawings that were neither "provincial nor nationalistic". As early as 1989, then art critic for The Canberra Times, Sonia Barron reviewed a group exhibition which included Martin and acknowledged that her theme of the industrial landscape had become quite familiar.

Other awards and recognitions include the John McCaughey Prize by the National Gallery of Victoria (1983), the Hugh Williamson Art Prize by the Ballarat Fine Art Gallery (1985), the Alice Prize (1990), the Arts ACT Creative Arts (2001), and the Land and Water Community (2002).

== The mature artist ==
From 1990 Martin created strong depictions of industrial landscapes and was invited to exhibit with other significant Australian artists and Martin's work was acquired by the Solomon R. Guggenheim Museum in New York. In Canberra, where Martin was still actively exhibiting, the long-time art critic for The Canberra Times, Sasha Grishin reviewed her 1991 exhibition of paintings and in particular her Yallourn Power Station No 2 which represents the embedding of a sense of place into the thick oil surfaces of her work. Grishin commenting that he felt she had not "burnt-out" despite her youth, the profile she had developed and general acclaim she was experiencing in the art world.

Martin returned to her activist roots and had been involved with the CLIMARTE organisation and associated festivals embracing the concept of 'Arts for a Safer Climate' exhibiting her work that addresses the concept of the anthropocene as well as giving lectures. In 2014 she exhibited alongside Fiona Hall and Janet Laurence a large work depicting a landscape deeply altered and scarred by mines, Vivitur Ex Raptor (for Bulga).

In 2017, a touring survey exhibition was held of 20 selected works. Homeground was a further examination of the variable New South Wales landscape and how the environment was affected by drought and coal mining. The works selected were drawn from the collection of the Bathurst Regional Gallery, the Orange Regional Gallery as well as works from the artist's personal collection. The exhibition included collaborative works with her son, artist Alexander Boynes.

Martin continued to be involved with a series of art projects that focus on issues relating to Australia's emissions targets.

Martin saw her strong conceptually-based recent work on the theme of climate change as an opportunity to get information across without lecturing her audience:

People can choose to engage if they like, and you can use it in a way which is quite seductive or interesting or humorous so an audience can empathise which then makes it possible for the content to come across.

Martin retired from the Canberra School of Art in 2003 moving to the Central West of New South Wales near Cowra where she had her studio.

The Geelong Art Gallery held a retrospective exhibition of their holdings of works by Martin from November 2022 to early February 2023, "Mandy Martin – A Persistent Vision". Art critic Christopher Allen describes her small-scale black-and white print of a pathway between a row of saw-tooth factory buildings as a successful contrast of perspective and flat pattern, in contrast to the colossal oil painting Factory 2 (Sawtooth) whose substance does not repay the attention its size seemingly demands.

== Personal life ==
Martin is the daughter of Peter Gordon Martin and Beryl Laura Maud Thomas. Her father, a geneticist and botanist, was Emeritus Professor of Botany at the University of South Australia, and her mother was a recognised watercolourist. Her brother is Nicholas Gordon Martin, an Australian behaviour geneticist.

Martin's first marriage was to Australian artist, Robert Boynes, producing two sons, Alexander Boynes, an artist and gallery administrator and Peter Boynes, an artist and curator. Her second marriage was to Guy Fitzhardinge, a director of Bush Heritage Australia.

Martin spent her last years living in Mandurama near Orange, New South Wales, Australia. She died in palliative care at Orange Base Hospital on 10 July 2021, after undergoing treatment for cancer.
