= Progressive Art Movement =

1970s Australian political art movement

The Progressive Art Movement (PAM) was a 1970s Australian political art movement based in Adelaide, South Australia. Co-founded by feminist artist Ann Newmarch, the group included Mandy Martin, who was very involved in the development of feminist art in Australia, along with other well-known men and women artists.

== Origins ==
In 1974 South Australian artist Ann Newmarch, along with philosopher and academic Brian Medlin, founded the Progressive Art Movement (PAM), which focused on political issues, social concerns, and education. It arose from a course at Flinders University called Politics and Art, and was inspired by Marxist Leninist theory. Medlin was foundation professor of philosophy at Flinders from 1967 to 1988.

== Description ==
The Progressive Art Movement, based in Adelaide, was part of a bigger movement that was pushing back against elitism in the art world, and the group produced art that used cheaper materials, making it more accessible to artists and the public, such as silk screen printing and posters. PAM defined itself as a political organisation, and often mounted protests at institutions such as the Art Gallery of South Australia.

Printmaker Ruth Faerber wrote when reviewing an exhibition of Adelaide art at the Art Gallery of NSW in 1977 that PAM was "motivated by a strong Marxist sociopolitical direction, agreed to a shared program for action and a sense of immediate imperative", compared with the Experimental Art Foundation, which did not commit to a set of agreed aims.

Mandy Martin wrote in 1989 that members of PAM were involved in "the front organisation of the worker student alliance, a front organisation itself of the highly secretive CPAML, the Communist Party of Australia (Marxist–Leninist)"... [which] had an essentially Maoist line, and all the strategies were based around the Maoist two stage revolution, that is allying with the bourgeoisie to expel the foreign imperialists, in this case the Americans, and supporting the working–class struggle. In turn, PAM had many front organisations itself, the main one being the campaign against foreign military bases... We really believed we were in a pre–revolutionary state and, under persistent harassment from the police, we engaged in often foolhardy campaigns". The artists targeted and infiltrated the car industry "because it was run by Americans, although it was one of the few viable industries in South Australia". The Free Will Hight campaign caused an internal division in PAM, as it caused many layoffs at Chrysler/Holden, and, in Martin's view, "perpetrated a gross injustice on Will Hight in the guise of social reform".

Martin was castigated by the communist elements of the group for "fraternising with the enemy" after learning that she had had lunch with visiting American feminist curator and writer Lucy Lippard and Australian art historian Terry Smith. She "didn't so much desert the ship but I certainly moved to one side", after realising that she did not want to confine her criticism to capitalism, but wanted to critique socialism as well.

== Members ==
The group included students, writers, artists, filmmakers, and poets among its membership. Artists associated with PAM included:

- Robert Boynes
- Jim Crowley
- Margaret Dodd
- Bert Flugelman
- Pamela Harris (1946–1992)
- Andrew Hill (born 1952)
- Jenni Hill
- Mandy Martin (1952–2021), painter, printmaker, and teacher
- Ann Newmarch
- Ken Searle
- Richard Turner

Robert Boynes doing an MA in film at Flinders University, and was making films and videos about painting and image production, and started producing colour screenprinted images in 1973.

Robert Boynes and Mandy Martin were married. They moved to Canberra in 1978. Mandy Martin was very involved in the development of feminist art in Australia, and was a student at the time she was part of PAM.

Andrew Hill (born 1952), is a painter, printmaker, theatre, film and graphic designer. He was associate professor at the UniSA 1979–2014, Director of the South Australian School of Art (2011–2014), and Associate Head of School at the School of Art, Architecture and Design at UniSA (2010–2014).

== Exhibitions ==
From 16 May until 5 July 2024, the Flinders University Museum of Art is mounting the exhibition If you don't fight... you lose: politics, posters and PAM, co-curated by art historian Catherine Speck and Jude Adams, with accompanying catalogue. They found a strong feminist element in the group, that was not celebrated as much at the time, and say that, while times are different, protest art continues in the same vein today.
