= Beverley Garlick =

Australian architect

Beverley Garlick (born 1944) is an Australian architect.

She completed a bachelor of architecture degree at the University of Melbourne.

Along with feminist contemporaries such as Vivienne Binns, Barbara Hall, Frances Phoenix, Jude Adams and Toni Robertson, Garlick was at the forefront of the development of the Women's Art Movement in Sydney in the 1970s.

In 1984, Garlick won the RAIA New South Wales Merit Award for the Petersham College of TAFE in Leichhardt, New South Wales, the first woman to win the award in the non-residential category.

In 2005, she won the Marion Mahony Griffin Prize from the Royal Australian Institute of Architects.

== Publications ==
- Beyond Beige: Improving Architecture for Older People and People with Disabilities (TAKE 6), 2008, Royal Australian Institute of Architects
