= Stephanie Radok =

Australian artist, writer (born 1954)

Stephanie Radok (born 1954) is an artist and writer based in Adelaide, South Australia, whose work is held in the National Gallery of Australia and the National Gallery of Victoria, Flinders University Art Museum, Geelong Art Gallery and the Art Gallery of South Australia. She worked as a general editor for Artlink and as an art critic for Artlink, Adelaide Review, and Art Monthly Australia and since 2024 has written reviews for The Saturday Paper.

== Biography ==
Radok was born in Melbourne, Australia, in 1954. Radok studied a degree in Visual Arts, with a major in Printmaking, at the Canberra School of Art from 1982 to 1985. In 2002, she completed a Master of Arts in Visual Art at the South Australian School of Art.

Radok’s writing about art is linked to memoir and the everyday, it includes lyrical passages that demonstrate art’s immense significance beyond its monetary value. Radok’s writing was first published in the art magazine Unreal City, which she founded with eX de Medici in 1986 in Canberra. She has written many catalogue essays including a notable one for Hossein Valamanesh titled Fingers of Memory. IAustralia’s international literary magazine HEAT published Radok’s non-fiction works Under The Bed in 2022 and Inventory 2020 in 2023. In 2025 Radok spoke at the Adelaide Stella Day Out literary festival alongside Michelle de Krester and Hannah Kent.

In The Conversation writer Carol Lefevre discussed recent books by artist/writers Celia Paul and Radok. "Both Stephanie Radok and Celia Paul record quiet lives, but it’s a quietness that hums with the astonishing richness of their creativity. Radok shakes out ordinary days for us, revealing and sharing the gold dust secreted in their pockets and seams."

== Art practice ==
Radok has held 21 solo exhibitions.

Her work has been exhibited in group exhibitions from 1977, with an artwork in The Women’s Show held by the Women's Art Movement in Adelaide in 1977. A major survey exhibition titled The Sublingual Museum was held at the Flinders University Museum of Art in 2011.

Radok is the co-author of a book published in 2007 on leading contemporary Australian jeweller Julie Blyfield.

In 2012 Radok’s book An Opening: twelve love stories about art was published by Wakefield Press. It was long listed for the inaugural Stella Prize for writing by women, and was widely reviewed.

"Radok shows how art reaches deeply into our lives in unexpected and ordinary ways: the tattered calendar cutting kept for decades and left behind in a photocopier, the postcard stuck to a laundry wall, or the persistent memory of something, seen perhaps only briefly, that alters one’s thinking utterly." Dr Michele McCrea, Transnational Literature.

Radok’s second memoir, Becoming a Bird, was published in March 2021. Martin Edmond wrote "Radok in her wanderings keeps a weather-eye out for what grows outside galleries, beside footpaths, and in public gardens of all descriptions. Everywhere she goes she looks for weeds, sometimes defined as plants growing in the wrong place". Under the Bed/Inventories 2020-2022, considered by Michelle de Kretser “ A simply glorious book," is Radok's third memoir, published in 2025. Radok was the inaugural winner of the Chapel Hill Horizons Art Prize 2025 for her painting on canvas titled, “It’s Morning!”

== Selected solo exhibitions ==
- 2025 Inside A Book, Reading Room, Institute Gallery, State Library of South Australia
- 2024 Tree Stories, Urrbrae House Museum, University of Adelaide, SA
- 2020 The Museum of Domestic Botany, Fabrik, Lobethal, SA
- 2017 A Prospect of Prospects, Prospect Gallery, SA
- 2011 The Sublingual Museum, Flinders University City Gallery
- 2004 Brightness falls from the air, N Gallery, South Australian School of Art, SA
- 2004 Shalom, Nexus Window, Adelaide, SA
- 2003 The Weight of Words, South Australian Museum
- 2003 Migration and local knowledge, Gabriel Gallery, Melbourne, Victoria
- 2002 Talking about country, Adelaide Botanic Gardens, Adelaide, SA
- 1999 Her native tongue, Gallery Spain, Contemporary Art Centre, Adelaide, SA

== Collections ==
- National Gallery of Australia
- National Gallery of Victoria
- Flinders University Art Museum
- Art Gallery of South Australia
