= Elizabeth Gower =

Australian artist (born 1952)

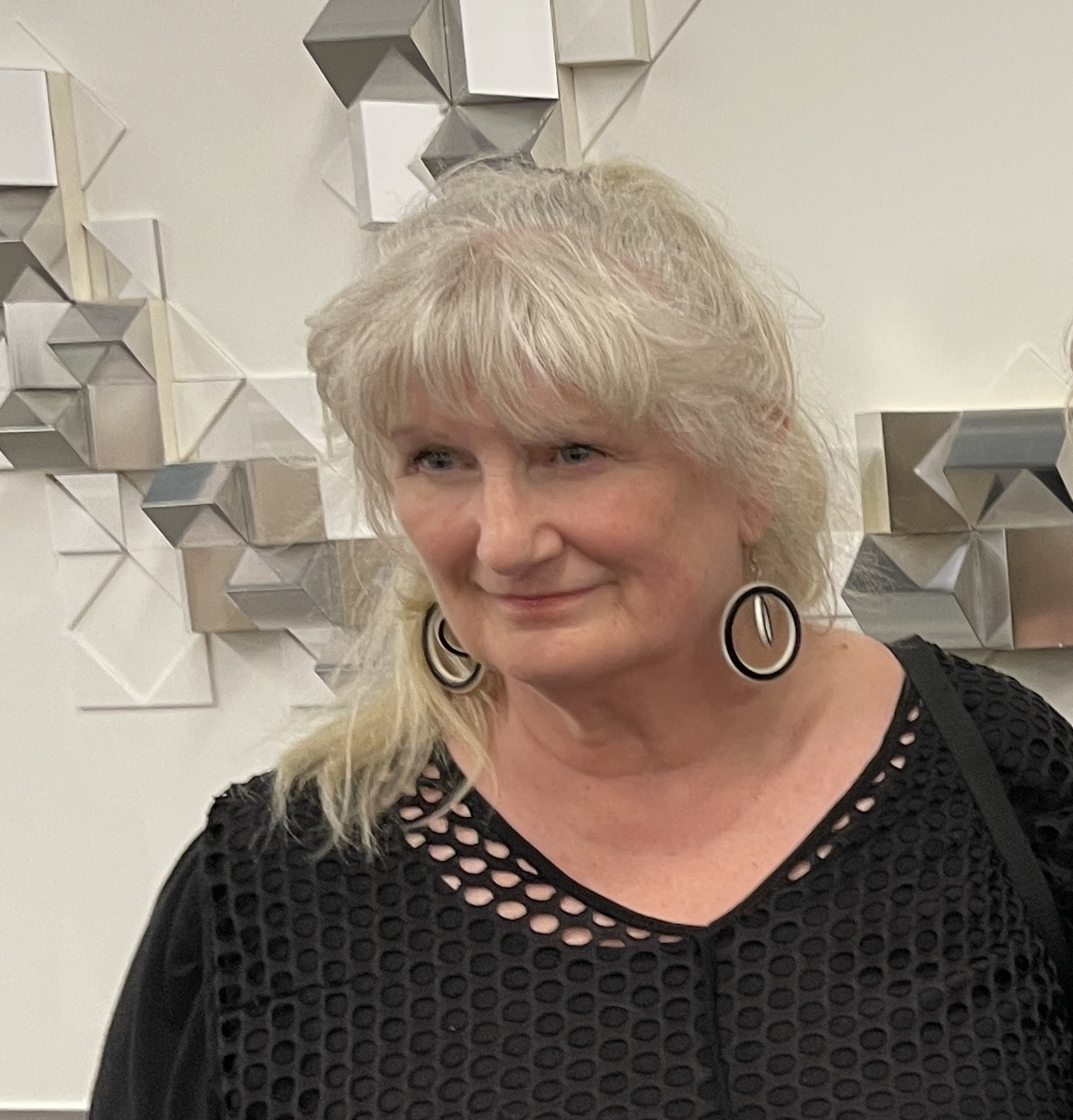
- Elizabeth Gower at the 50 years of the Women's Art Register exhibition 2025
- Occupation: Artist

Elizabeth Gower (born 1952) is an Australian abstract artist who lives and works in Melbourne. She is best known for her work in paper and mixed-media monochrome and coloured collages, drawn from her sustained practice of collecting urban detritus.

== Early life and education ==
Gower was born in Adelaide, South Australia in 1952. In 1973 she completed a Diploma of Art and Design at Prahran College of Advanced Education, Melbourne. She also holds a Diploma of Education, Melbourne Teachers College (1974), a Master of Arts, RMIT University, Melbourne (1995) and a PhD from Monash University, Melbourne (2014).

== Teaching ==
Gower has held teaching positions at the University of Melbourne and the Victorian College of the Arts and is an Honorary Fellow of the University of Melbourne. Throughout this academic career, Gower has curated exhibitions and research projects and authored essays and catalogues. These projects build on her professional and creative interests, and often bring together groups of emerging and established artists. Australian Arts Review argues that her teaching and art have influenced many of Melbourne's emerging artists.

== Artistic practice ==
Gower has been exhibiting since 1975 and is represented by Sutton Gallery in Melbourne and Milani Gallery in Brisbane. Her work developed as a young artist during the 1970s feminist movement, and with her involvement with groups such as the Women's Art Movement, the Women's Art Register and the Lip Collective. Her use of collages and wall hangings in largely abstract compositions deploys domestic materials such as newspaper and tissue paper, as well as textiles and craft techniques. Curator Lisa Sullivan states that Gower's work elevates forms and practises derisively considered ‘women’s work’ to the status of art.

Collecting ephemera, discarded printed material and paper cuttings is also integral to Gower's critique of consumerism and waste. Gower uses graphic design elements and repetition of cut out pictures of spectacles, shoes, tea-bag labels or stickers from fruit, to create decorative and optical effects, often on transparent paper. Other works explore multiple images of fish, crabs and other crustaceans, fruit and vegetables, grasses, beetles, butterflies, flowers, insects, snakes and frogs.

In 2005, artist Kate Just outlined substantial changes in Gower's practice in a review in Eyeline journal: "In recent years, however, Gower’s collecting has eschewed the material world in favour of more evocative things: meaningful events, conversations and places that have marked the world at large. After September 11, Gower compiled lists of significant attacks, invasions, battles, or conflicts which took place in the modern world between September 11, 1901 and September 11, 2001 and presented them on long sheets of drafting film."

The Geelong Art Gallery hosted a major survey of Gower's work in 2018, Cuttings- Elizabeth Gower, which covered significant bodies of work from early 2000 onwards.

== Residencies and awards ==
Gower has been awarded numerous awards and residencies throughout her long career: The Lynch Prize for Painting, Toorak Art Gallery (1973), Georges Art Prize (1978), Alliance Francaise Art Fellowship (1980), Mornington Drawing Prize in 1995, Fellowship grant, Australia Council, Visual Arts/Crafts Board (2002) and an Australian Postgraduate Award (2006). She has travelled extensively and completed a number of prestigious international residencies including the Australia Council, Visual Arts/Crafts Board, Green Street Studio, NYC (2008), the Art Gallery of New South Wales Denise Hickey studio, Cité Internationale des Arts, Paris (2007), the Australia Council Visual Arts/Crafts Board, Barcelona Studio (2000), the Australia Council Visual Arts/Crafts Board, Paretaio Studio, Italy (1983), Point B Residency, NYC (2014), and the Institut für alles Mögliche studio in Wedding, Berlin (2019).

== Exhibitions ==
=== Solo ===
Gower's first major solo exhibition was held in 1975 at George Paton Gallery, Melbourne. Since then she has held many regular solo exhibitions in private and state galleries in Melbourne, Sydney, Brisbane and Canberra and in regional Australian galleries. Internationally, her work has been shown in New York, London, Paris and the United Arab Emirates.

Her series of Cuttings exhibitions were of discarded materials or ephemera found and re-purposed into artworks during her residencies: Cuttings (from Barcelona) Sutton Gallery, Melbourne and Bellas Gallery, Brisbane 2001; Cuttings (from St.Kilda) Sutton Gallery, Melbourne, 2004; Cuttings (from Paris) Sutton Project Space, Melbourne, 2008 and Cuttings (from New York) Sutton Gallery, Melbourne, 2010. The Cuttings series culminated in a survey exhibition in 2018, Cuttings- Elizabeth Gower at the Geelong Art Gallery.

Other survey exhibitions have included Chance or Design and Beyond the Everyday touring Victoria in 1995–96 and 2002–03, Conversations 1955 - 2005 and Sites 1980 - 2005 Victorian College of the Arts Gallery, Melbourne 2005, Beyond the everyday: The art of Elizabeth Gower 1974 - 2002 Glen Eira City Gallery, Melbourne 2002 and Mildura Arts Centre, Hamilton Art Gallery and Wangaratta Exhibition Gallery, 2003, Line of Thought 1975-2002 and Portrait of the Artist as a Young Woman 1974 - 2002 Sutton Gallery, Melbourne, 2002.

=== Group ===
Since the 70s, Gower has showed regularly in group exhibitions, especially those about feminist, abstract or collage art. Some significant group exhibitions have included Treasures of a Decade, 1968-1978 National Gallery of Victoria, Melbourne, 1978, Biennale of Sydney, Art Gallery of NSW, Sydney 1979, Fieldwork Australian Art 1968-2002 Ian Potter Centre: National Gallery of Victoria 2002, Imaging the apple, various galleries, Sydney, Melbourne, regional areas, New York, 2004–5, 2010, Cut with a knife touring Melbourne and regional galleries 2012–13, Howard Arkley (and friends), Tarra Warra Museum of Art, Victoria, 2015, Melbourne Now, National Gallery of Victoria, 2013, Abstraction: celebrating Australian women abstract artists, from the National Gallery of Australia collection touring to regional galleries 2017, and Unfinished Business: perspectives on feminism and art, Australian Centre for Contemporary Art, Melbourne 2018. In 2024 her early abstract work was exhibited in Radical: Australian Abstract Art of the 70s and 80s at the Warrnambool Art Gallery.

=== Public commissions ===
Gower has also been commissioned to produce several public artworks such as banners, light boxes, facades, floor and wall murals. The Lost and Found floor mural in the arena foyer at Sydney Olympic Park (formerly Sydney Super Dome now Qudos Bank Arena) features broken line drawings of athletes and sporting motifs.

== Personal life ==
She was first married to Howard Arkley (1973-1980?) then John R Neeson (1984- ). Gower and Neeson collaborate as artists and co-curators as well as producing individual work.
