= Robert Boynes =

Australian artist (born 1943)

Robert Boynes (born 1942) is a contemporary Australian artist.

== Early life and education ==
Boynes was born in Adelaide, South Australia, in 1942, and grew up in Peterhead, South Australia.

He studied at the South Australian School of Art in Adelaide from 1959 to 1961, where he returned to undertake further studies in Printmaking from 1962 to 1964. Boynes completed a Master of Fine Arts in Film at Flinders University, Adelaide, from 1974 to 1975.

== Career ==
Boynes thereafter lectured at the Wattle Park Teachers' College and South Australian School of Art between 1964 and 1967.

Boynes first began exhibiting professionally in 1964, when he held his first solo show at Clune Galleries in Sydney. He held solo exhibitions at Hungry Horse Art Gallery in Sydney, and Australian Galleries in Melbourne in July 1967. The latter exhibition featured his work Department Store, which signified a turning point in the artist's early career.

In 1967 Boynes left Australia for England, where he worked as a lecturer at the Maidstone College of Art, Kent and Basingstoke Tech College from 1968 to 1969.

He returned to Australia in 1970 and then mainly lectured in painting and printmaking at Wattle Park Teachers' College and Murray Park CAE between 1970 and 1977. During this period, he also lectured in painting at the South Australian School of Art in 1972.

Boynes left Adelaide and relocated to Canberra in 1978, where he took up the position as senior lecturer and head of painting at the Canberra School of Art. He held the position until his retirement in 2006. In 1995 a retrospective of three decades of his work was held in the Nolan Gallery in Canberra.

Boynes exhibited his multi-panel installation Long Take-Slow Dissolve at Art Stage Singapore in 2015. Two of his artworks in the collections of the Art Gallery of New South Wales (AGNSW) and the National Gallery of Victoria were shown in the exhibition Pop to Popism at the AGNSW from 2014 to 2015. A solo show, In Plain Sight, was held at the May Space in Sydney in 2015, and in the same year, his work Auto Sex was acquired by the AGNSW.

In 2017 the ANU Drill Hall Gallery presented a retrospective of Boynes' work since 2000, titled Robert Boynes Modern Times, and curated by gallery director Terence Maloon.

== Artistic practice ==
His early work was influenced by English pop art and photo-realism. He was involved with the Progressive Art Movement, a group of artists and others committed to social change, including Ann Newmarch, Mandy Martin, Jenni Hill and Andrew Hill. His work of the 1960s and 70s has been described as "not so much social commentaries as explorations into the language of art and into the ability of art to both reflect society and to actively interact with that society.

Although during the 1960s his work was marked by increasing awareness in Australia's role as part of a larger Western culture, primarily associated with the United States, Boynes had an explicit preference for England and European culture, which led to his departure for England in late 1967. He was inspired by the interrogation of consumerism of the neo-pop era, and was influenced by artists such as Richard Hamilton, R.B. Kitaj and James Rosenquist. His series Leisure Machinery was exhibited at the Bear Lane Gallery in Oxford, England, in 1969.

After returning to Australia in 1970, Boynes held an exhibition at the Bonython Art Gallery in Sydney, between February and March of the same year. During this period, Boynes often expressed his opinions on social and political issues through his artworks. Some critiques on his works disappointed him, the fact that the intellectually sophisticated nature of his imagery and its concomitant statements about sexual and social aggression and alienation seemed to be lost, made the artist started to rethink his aesthetic position. One of his most important artworks Let's Make Things Perfectly Clear from this period was thereafter represented in 1975 and was acquired by the National Gallery of Australia.

After moving to Canberra in 1978, he was still examining the social and political issues, but started focusing more on the alienation of the individual, "individuals removed from the possibility of determining in any way their roles in an increasingly disinterested society". The political explicitness of his work during the mid-1970s was gradually humanised. He held an exhibition at the Gallery A in Sydney in 1981, in which his work showed architectural spaces (often arches, vaults or curving corridors) overlaid with a lushly applied painterly surface.

Another topic that has had a special significance for Boynes is landscape. From 1984 he had produced works through the theme of construction and destruction, but it was progressively changed to Australian bush landscape in 1995. Faith and Empire-Lowtide is a major work of the artist from the mid-1980s.

Boynes more and more depicted the urban landscape in the 1990s. His new series of works about the theme of city started around 1992. In the mid-1990s, the city for Boynes was "...the source of complex, searching and highly resonant images... Boynes' city is a city, which engages itself with those internal force, which give it character. It also engages with those external forces which imbue it with a state of potentiality, transforming it from an inert unknown mass into an actuality realized through the purposeful action of its inhabitants and through the creative action of the artist".

In 1999, the artist created many artworks depicting the urban environment. He began to utilise the uncertainty innate in the urban configuration from 2000. From 2002 onwards, he was trying different ways of presenting his world. The ongoing visualisation of the "possibilities for glimpsing something of the inherent energy, continuity and illusive mystery underlying human experience and memory" remain at the core of his art.

== Recognition and awards ==
- 2017 Canberra Critics Circle exhibition of the year, Canberra ACT
- 2015 Artsource Artist in Residence, Fremantle Art Centre, Fremantle WA
- 2012 Capital Artist Patrons Organisation Fellowship Award, Canberra ACT; Visiting Artist, Westfield Belconnen Centre, Canberra ACT
- 2007 ARIA Living Artist Award, Gold Coast QLD
- 2006 Canberra Times Artist of the Year Award, Canberra ACT
- 2002 Residency of Chur, Switzerland
- 2001/2 RAAF Memorial, Anzac Parade, Canberra ACT
- 2001 Italo-Australia Club Canberra Art Prize, Canberra ACT
- 2000 Federal Court, Canberra ACT; Legislative Assembly, Canberra ACT
- 1999 Foyer, W Hotel, Finger Wharf, Sydney NSW
- 1998 Residency of Artspace, Sydney NSW
- 1996/7 Metre painting installation, Canberra ACT
- 1993/6 Project Grant, ACT Cultural Council
- 1983 Mattara Inv. Purchase Prize, Newcastle Region Art Gallery, Newcastle NSW
- 1981 Purchase Award, Gold Coast Art Prize, Gold Coast QLD
- 1976/7 Mural, Adelaide Festival Centre, Adelaide SA
- 1975 Alice Springs Art Award, Alice Springs NT
- 1973 Project Grant, VAB, Australia Council
- 1971 Barossa Festival Art Prize
- 1964 Ether Barringer Memorial Prize for Etching

== Selected solo exhibits ==
- Bonython Art Gallery, Adelaide (1966)
- Arts Council of GB, Bear Lane Gallery, Oxford, UK (1969)
- "Survey 7", National Gallery of Victoria, Melbourne Realities, Melbourne Gallery A, Sydney (1979)
- Phillip Bacon Galleries, Brisbane (1980)
- Robert Steele Gallery, Adelaide Austral Gallery, St. Louis, USA (1989)
- "Urban Simulations", University of Melbourne Museum of Art, Ian Potter Gallery (1995)
- Austral Gallery, St Louis, USA (1999)
- “True Fictions”, Retrospective at Canberra Museum and Gallery (2005)
- “Long Take – Slow Dissolve”, Art Stage Singapore, Marina Bay Sands (2015)
- “Silver Thread”, Beaver Galleries, Canberra (2023)
