= Peter Gordon Martin =

Australian geneticist (1923–1994)

Peter Gordon Martin (20 June 1923 – 15 December 1994) was an Australian geneticist and botanist, as well as a naval officer. He completed his BSc and PhD at the University of Adelaide, where was appointed lecturer and professor. Martin's work, influenced by the theory of continental drift, showed a genetic connection of South American and Australian marsupials to a Gondwanan common origin. He was awarded several academic awards and distinctions.

== Early life ==
Born in North Adelaide, Australia, Martin was the only son of Annie Violet De Rose and Stanley Gordon Martin. After he completed studies at Prince Alfred College in 1940, he joined Australian Permanent Naval Forces. As a sub-lieutenant, he participated in the invasion of Sicily (July 1943), and reaching the rank of lieutenant, he acted as second-in-command of HMAS Barwon and HMAS Gladstone. In 1943, Martin was present in Tokyo Bay for the surrender of Japanese forces.

== Education and research ==
Martin completed his BSc (1953) and PhD (1957) at the University of Adelaide, and he began as a lecturer there in 1956. In 1969, Martin attained the position of professor of botany. He was award the John Bagot (1949) and Ernest Ayers (1951) scholarships, a Gowrie Scholarship Trust Fund award (1950), and the Elsie Marion Cornish (1951) and William Culross (1955) prizes.

As a proponent of geophysicist Alfred Wegener's hypothesis of continental drift and its biogeographical consequences, he and his colleague, geneticist David Hayman, published, Mammalia I: Monotremata and Marsupialia, in 1974. This publication

...provided a clear account of changes in chromosomal morphology and number over evolutionary time, and indicated that Australian and South American marsupials had a common Gondwanan origin. Many of the scholars who subsequently helped to make Australia pre-eminent in the field of marsupial evolution were either taught or influenced by Martin or Hayman.

He retired in 1984 and was made professor emeritus the same year. The Peter Martin Prize for Excellence in Scientific Communication was established in his name. His work's significance continues,

Pete Martin was one of the most influential pioneers in the development of evolutionary studies using macromolecules [at the University of Adelaide]. His research included work on microbial genetics...marsupial chromosome structure and evolution and angiosperm phylogeny and biogeography using plant protein, RNA and DNA sequences. He was an early champion of evolutionary genetics, molecular phylogeny and continental drift.

Though Martin died in 1994 from cancer, his final co-authored paper was published posthumously in 2000.

== Family ==
Martin was married to Beryl Laura Maud Thomas, a known Australian watercolourist. They had two children, Nicholas Gordon Martin, a geneticist and botanist, and Amanda Laura de Rose (Mandy) Martin, an Australian painter and print maker.

== Selected publications ==
Hayman, D. L., Martin, P. G. (1969). Cytogenetics of marsupials. In K. Benirschke (ed). Comparative Mammalian Cytogenetics (pp. 191-227). Springer-Verlag.

Hayman, D. L., Martin, P. G. (1974). Mammalia I: Monotremata and marsupialia. In B. John (ed). Animal Cyogenet. Berlin: Gebruder Borntraeger.
