= Therese Ritchie =

Australian photographer (born 1961)

- Born: 1961 (age 64–65); Darwin, Northern Territory, Australia
- Occupation: Artist
- Known for: Visual art; social commentary

Therese Ritchie (born 1961) is an Australian contemporary artist, writer and graphic designer, based in Darwin in the Northern Territory. She is known for her collaborations with Chips Mackinolty and Peter Cook, including founding Green Ant Research Arts and Publishing in 1990, and for her representation of Aboriginal Australian issues.

== Early life and education ==
Ritchie was born in Newcastle in New South Wales in 1961.

After moving to the Northern Territory in 1980, she completed a Diploma of Arts and Bachelor of Fine Arts from the Northern Territory University now Charles Darwin University (CDU) in 1985.

In 2001, Ritchie studied animation at the Victorian College of the Arts in Melbourne.

She was then awarded a Masters in Visual Arts from CDU in 2005.

== Career ==
Ritchie co-founded, with Chips Mackinolty and Peter Cook, Green Ant Research Arts and Publishing in 1990.

She later founded her own commercial graphic design business, Black Dog Graphics.

== Selected work ==
Ritchie produced a range of publications and exhibitions known as LittlePricks from 2012 to 2014, featuring work by many Top End artists in response to comments by Rob Knight, the then Northern Territory Minister for Young Territorians, who called Indigenous children "little pricks" for burning the Australian flag during the Australia Day demonstrations in Canberra.

She collaborated with artists from the Borroloola region in 2016 on Open Cut: Jacky Green, Sean Kerins, Therese Ritchie an exploration of the complex relationship between Aboriginal people and the mining companies working on their land.

== Exhibitions ==
A retrospective of her work with renowned artist Chips Mackinolty, Not Dead Yet, was exhibited at the CDU Art Gallery in 2010.

A solo retrospective Burning Hearts was exhibited at the Museum and Art Gallery of the Northern Territory in 2019.

== Collections ==
Ritchie's work is featured in the collections of the National Gallery of Australia, Museum and Art Gallery of the Northern Territory, Araluen Arts Centre, Gallery of Modern Art Queensland, Artbank, Flinders University and Charles Darwin University.
