= Tin Sheds =

Art workshop and later gallery at the University of Sydney, Australia

The Tin Sheds was the common name of the Sydney University Art Workshop, an Australian art workshop in Sydney, New South Wales, founded in 1969. Its name lives on in the Tin Sheds Gallery at the University of Sydney School of Architecture, Design and Planning. Groups such as Optronic Kinetics and the Earthworks Poster Collective operated out of Tin Sheds.

== History ==
Tin Sheds was founded in 1969 by artists Donald Brook, Marr Grounds and his wife Joan Grounds as an autonomous and informal venue on the grounds of Sydney University. The name was given because the workshop occupied some old CSR sheds in the university grounds. Officially designated as a place for students to study and practise the methods of the old masters, the founding artists and other tutors encouraged students of the arts, architecture, and engineering students (and anyone else) to dream and create all manner of artworks; it was a "nursery for conceptual art. They tried to understand and define the notion of art, and stayed open 24/7. There was a radical element that intimidated some of the other students.

Renowned sculptor Bert Flugelman was coordinator of Tin Sheds from the beginning until 1973. He became a lifelong friend of Brook.

Bernard Smith was involved with the workshop, and wanted to change the name to Fine Arts University Workshop.

Some experimented with computer graphics and other forms, leading to the emergence of Optronic Kinetics in 1970.

The Earthworks Poster Collective was based at Tin Sheds for the whole of its existence, from 1972 to 1979. During this time, Tin Sheds was officially known as the Sydney University Art Workshop.

The School of Architecture, Design and Planning was always a supporter of the workshop, and from late 70s the Tin Sheds offered courses recognised for credit by the Fine Arts and Architecture departments of the university. In 2004 Tin Sheds moved into new purpose-built workshops and a gallery in the school, at 148 City Road, Darlington.

== Optronic Kinetics ==
A few medical and engineering students began to use their expertise with computer graphics, and to experiment with electronics and movement; Brook encouraged them to push the boundaries, and Flugelman introduced them to sculpture. This experimentation gave rise to the sculpture collective known as Optronic Kinetics in 1970, which used science and technology to experiment with art.

The group's founding members included Julie Ewington (then a fine arts student, later a well-known writer and curator), and electrical engineering students David Smith (b.1945) and Jim McDonnell (b.1948). Along with Flugelman, the students created "conceptually ambitious and humorous works" such as Cubed tree, Feathered office, and Flashing boob. Other works included Electronic colour organ and Reflector. Feathered office' (1971) was described by Brook thus: "One Monday morning I was delighted to find my own room transformed with chicken feathers... set with their quills in an obsessively regular grid, as if the room had sprouted them, to its own astonishment, out of its own naturally tidy follicles".

A collection of Optronic Kinetics' work was gifted to Flinders University Museum of Art (FUMA) by Brook, as Emeritus Professor at the university.

== Tin Sheds Gallery ==
The Tin Sheds Gallery hosts exhibitions and issues publications relating to national and international architecture, art, design and urbanism.

== Legacy ==
Tin Sheds was the only experimental art workshop at the time; Inhibodress, founded by Mike Parr and Peter Kennedy, grew out of it, and soon other alternative venues proliferated.

== People ==
Others involved with the organisation of Tin Sheds include:

- Vivienne Binns, tutor in painting and drawing at Tin Sheds in the late 1980s
- Chips Mackinolty (Earthworks Poster Collective)
- Marie McMahon (Earthworks Poster Collective)
- Frances Phoenix, researcher of the history of women's needlework, tutor in women's needlework
- David Saunders, architect, tutor (later appointed professor of architecture at the University of Adelaide in 1977; second president of Australia International Council on Monuments and Sites from 1978)

Artists who took courses at Tin Sheds include:

- Barbara Campbell (born 1961), Super 8 course, 1987
- Michael Riley (1960–2004), photography course

== See also ==
- The Print Circle
- Australian poster collectives
