= Stobie pole =

Power line pole made of two steel joists separated by concrete

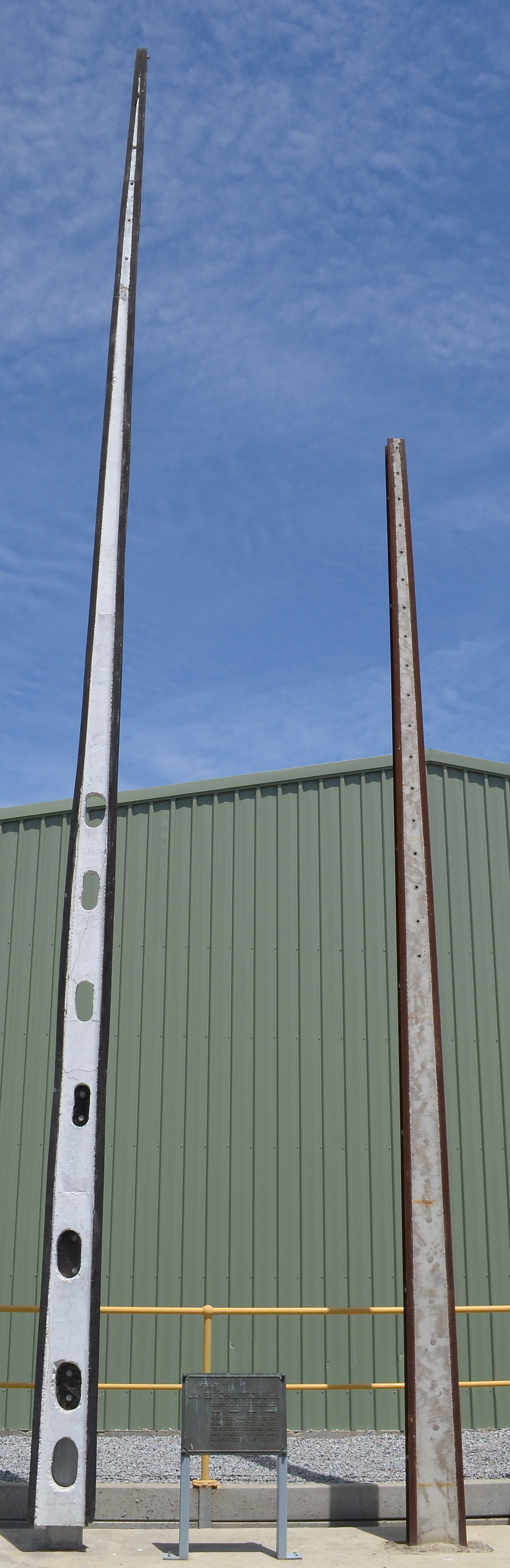
Original 1924 Stobie pole (left) next to a modern Stobie pole (right) at the Angle Park manufacturing plant (Note: The plaque between the poles (see closeup in gallery section) reads: "A tribute to James Cyril Stobie M.E. Designer of the Stobie Pole. This pole, manufactured in 1924 and erected in the Templers-Freeling 33 kV line was removed in 1959 and incorporated in this tribute in 1960.")

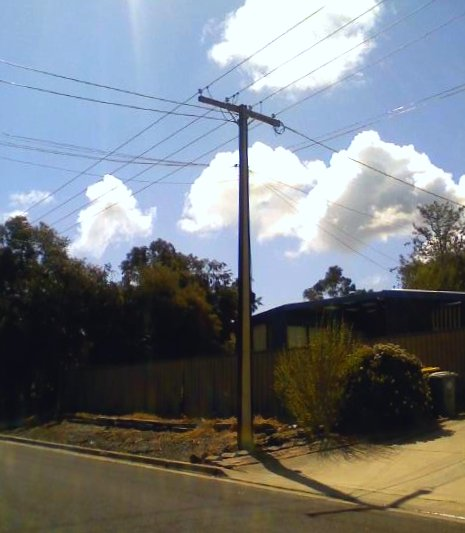
Stobie pole in an Adelaide suburb

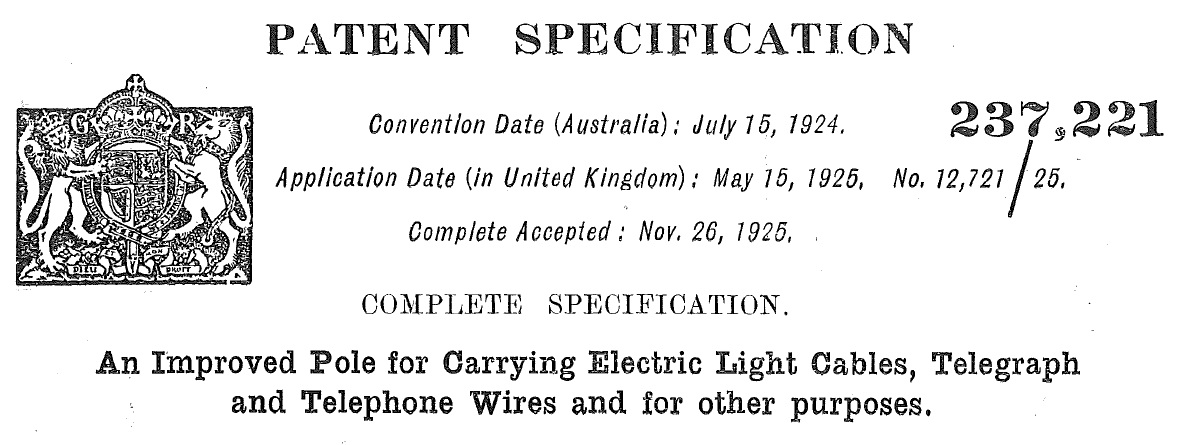
Original Patent Application

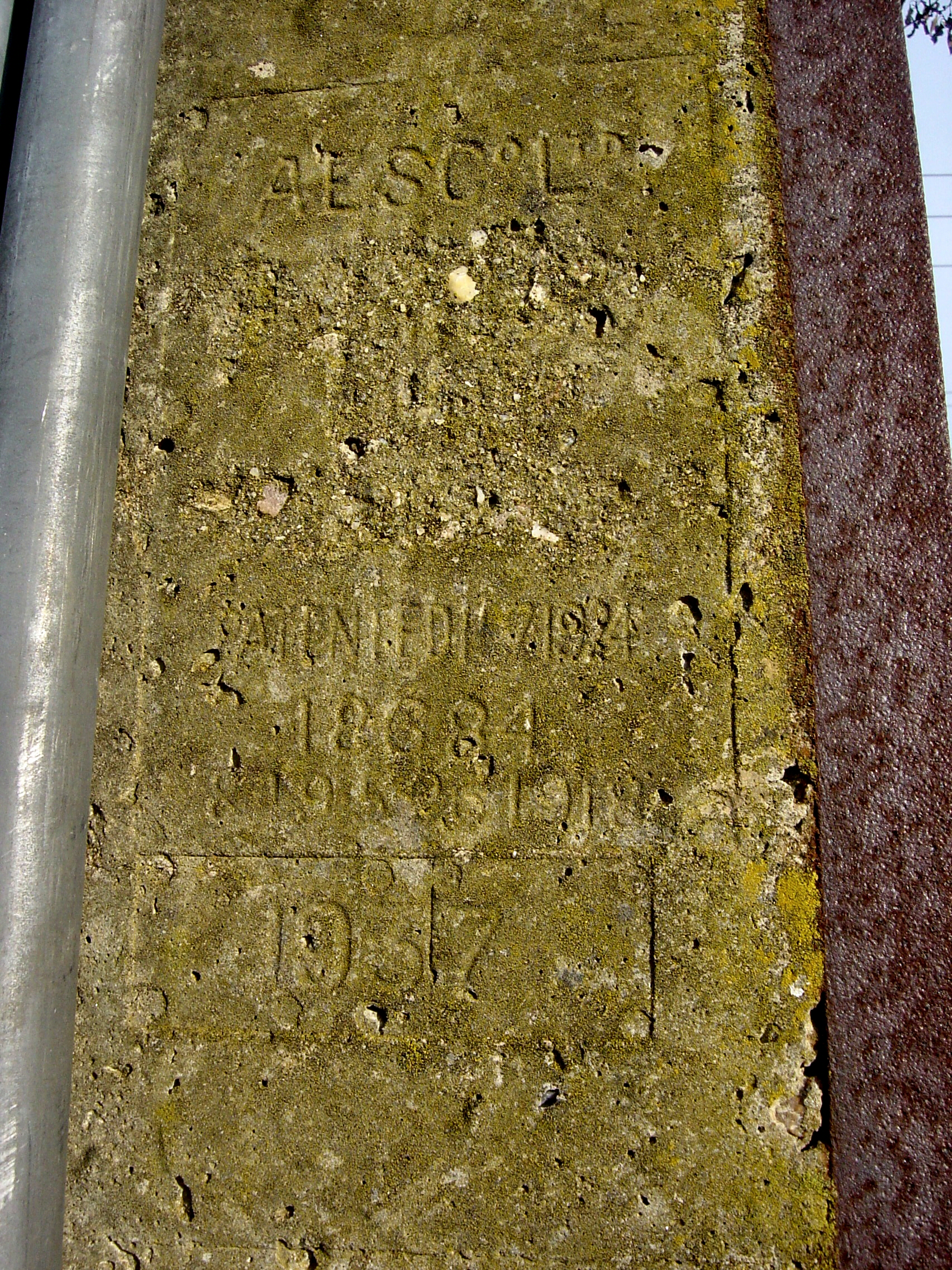
1937 imprint

A Stobie pole is a power line pole made of two steel I-beams, joined by tie-bolts, and held apart by a slab of concrete. It was invented by Adelaide Electric Supply Company engineer James Cyril Stobie, who suggested the use of readily available materials due to the shortage of suitably long, strong, straight and termite-resistant timber in South Australia.

They have continued to be used in the state capital, Adelaide, and around South Australia ever since, and there are some in other places in Australia as well. Since the 1980s, many Stobie poles have been decorated with artworks or surrounded with plants to beautify them.

== History ==
On July 15, 1924, engineer James Cyril Stobie (1895–1953) submitted the patent application for his pole design in both English and French. It was accepted in November 1925. Stobie described his invention as

...an improved pole adopted to be used for very many purposes, but particularly for carrying electric cables, telegraph wires... [it] consists of two flanged beams of iron or steel, preferably rolled steel joist of 'H' or of channel sections, placed one beside the other with their flanges inward and preferably at a very slight angle one with the other and held together by means of tie bolts, the space between them being filled with cement concrete.

A second patent was granted to Stobie and Frederick William Herbert Weadon in 1946. With John Ragless Brookman they formed The Stobie Pole Syndicate for the purpose of patenting the design and then selling the patent or manufacturing rights. The Hume Pipe Company became their first agents and, while there were numerous international enquiries, as of the mid-1990s South Australia remained the only place where they are widely used.

== Installations ==
The first poles were erected in South Terrace, Adelaide city centre, in 1924, and were then used extensively in building the electricity transmission and distribution infrastructure throughout the state. The Stobie pole was central to the speedy expansion of Adelaide Electricity Supply Company's supply. It was cheap and simple to produce, had a uniform appearance, saved an enormous amount of timber from being harvested, had a long life expectancy and, at the time, was seen as more environmentally sensitive.

Stobie poles are also common in Broken Hill, as well as the Darwin CBD, and there are a few thousand installed across Tasmania. A few also exist in Canberra and isolated settlements in the Goldfields-Esperance region of Western Australia such as Eucla and Rawlinna.

SA Power Networks review alternative pole designs available on the market from time to time and has yet to find one with the benefits offered by the Stobie pole, which include long life, low cost and ease of maintenance, and resilience in bushfire and flooding events. One disadvantage is greater susceptibility to lightning strikes.

SAPN sister company, Powercor, also has a number of stobie poles installed on its network.

== Design and construction ==
Each year SA Power Networks manufactures around 4,500 Stobie poles at a plant in Angle Park, South Australia.

The poles carry supply voltages from 240 to 275,000 volts and come in various sizes from 9–26 m (30–85 ft) in length, though studies indicate heights to 36 m (118 ft) are feasible. The service life of a Stobie pole is predicted to be in excess of 80 years. It is now commonly regarded as a South Australian icon.

Its modern construction is a composite of two steel I-beams connected intermittently by bolts to manage compressive buckling, with the gap between the beams filled with concrete. The bolts transfer the shear, with an equal number of bolts above and below ground. The poles are tapered from ground level to the top and the toe. This construction uses the tensile properties of the steel, giving the poles excellent properties in bending. Stobie pole strength in the strong direction may be up to 4.5 times the weak direction strength. Small holes through the concrete enable attachment of modular cross-arms, insulators and other hardware. The poles are fireproof, rotproof, and termiteproof. Stobie poles are widely regarded in Australia to be dangerous to vehicles, with collisions sometimes "almost cutting the vehicle in half".

Stobie pole designs are calculated to ensure the installation uses a suitably sized pole. Factors such as physical mass (static load) of transformers, cross beams, voltage regulators, protection devices, conductors (including tension), etc. are considered, and the wind loading (dynamic load) of this equipment must also be calculated. In some cases the wind loading factors far exceed the static load values.

== Artistic use ==
Stobie poles were first used for art in the 1980s by pioneering artist Ann Newmarch, who lived and worked in Prospect.

Artist Clifton Pugh painted Adam and Eve in the Garden of Eden on a Stobie pole in 1984, but was subsequently asked to "cover up" the genitals on his painting.

Since then, various attempts have been made to beautify their appearance through Stobie pole gardens and Stobie pole art projects.

SA Power Networks has an application process for submitting designs for Stobie pole art, used by community groups, artists, and primary and high schools, which have painted murals or installed mosaics on Stobie poles located outside their premises.

== Gallery ==
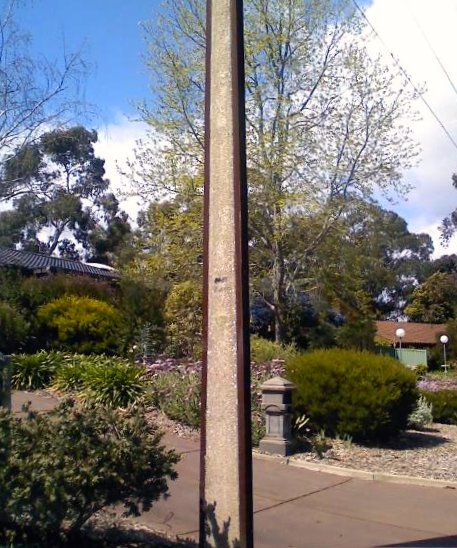

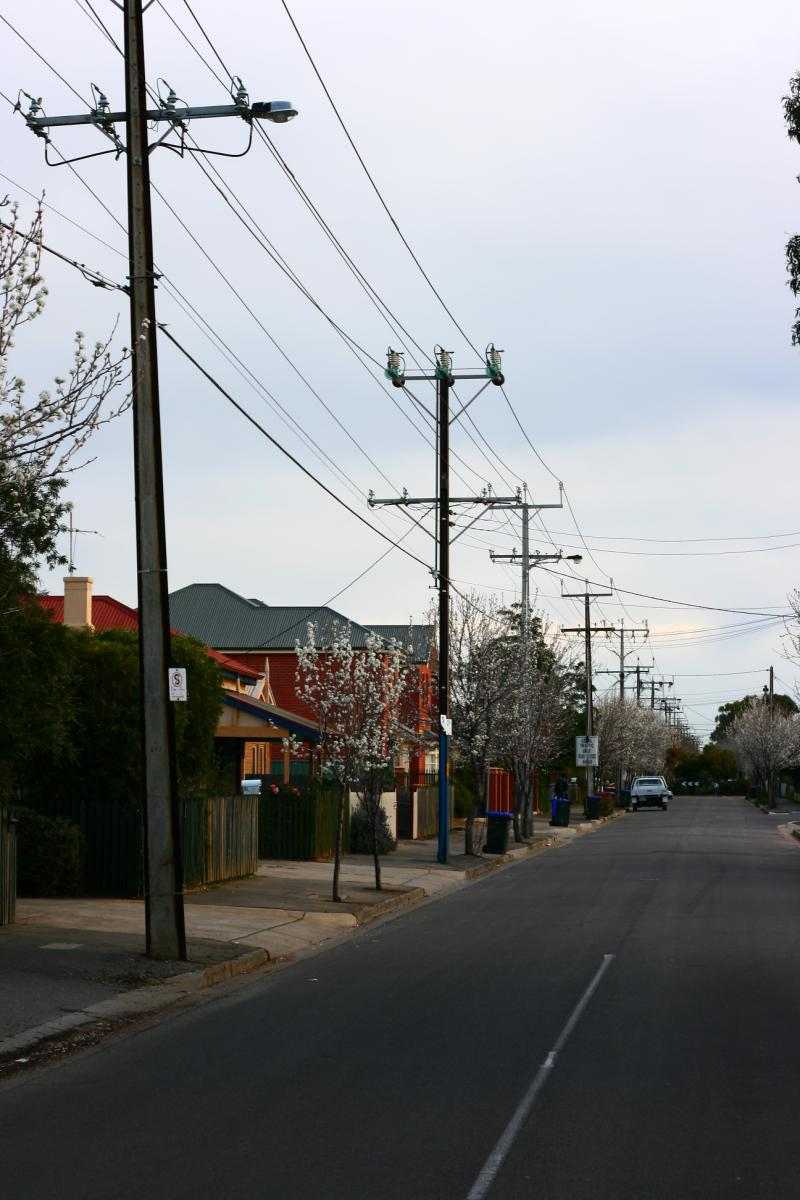

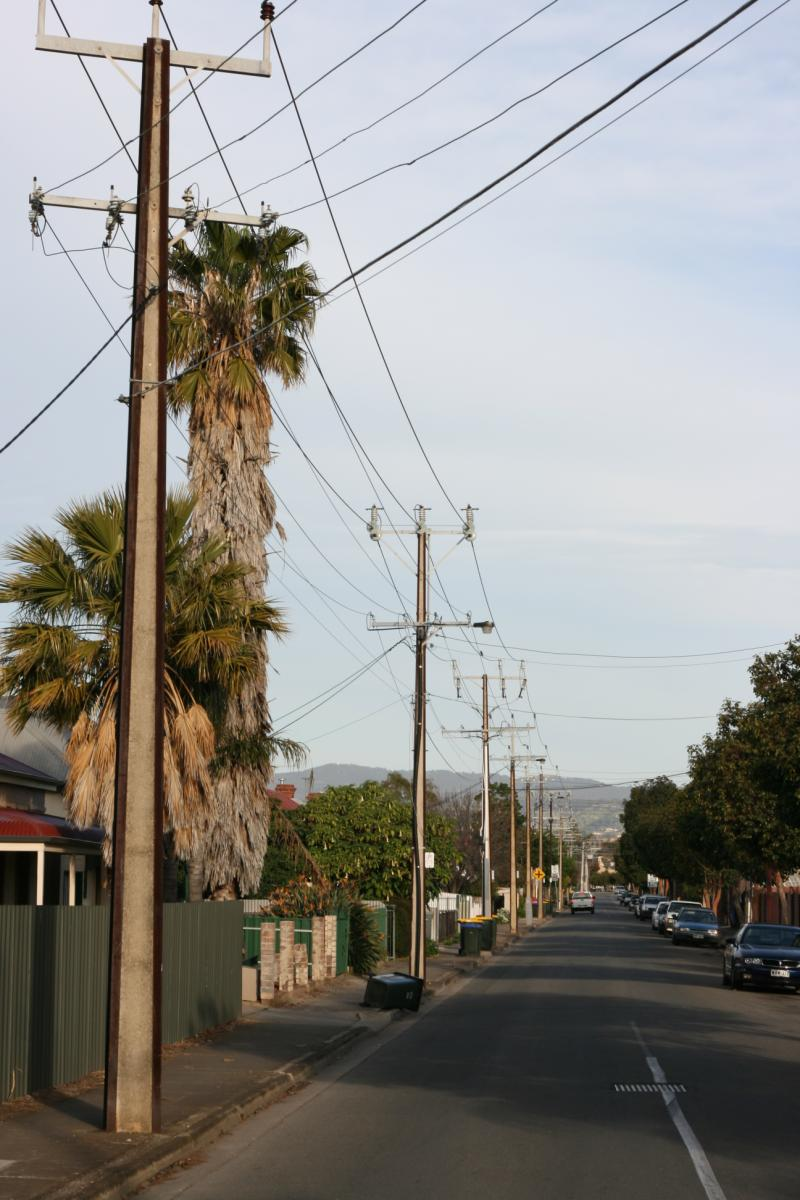

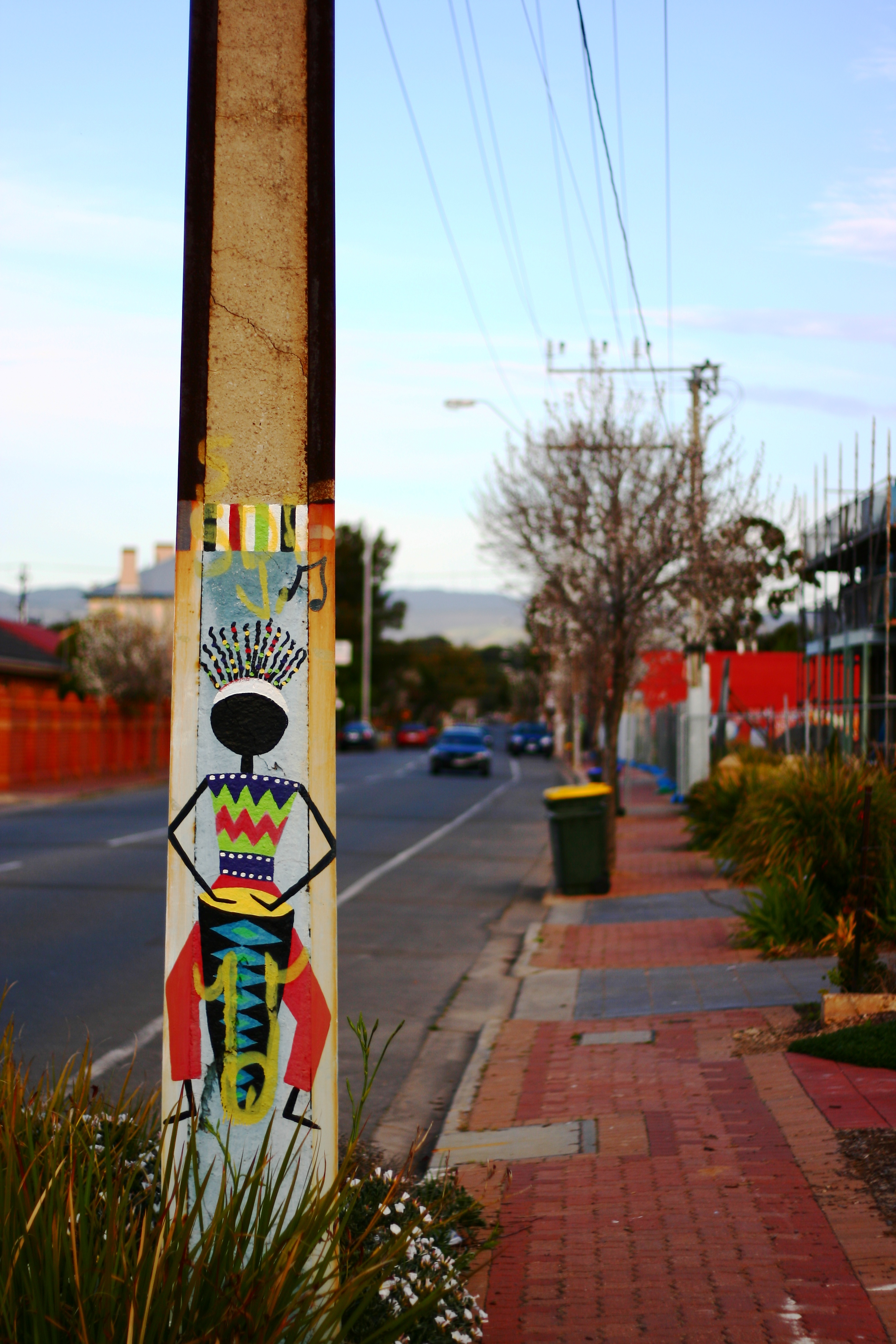

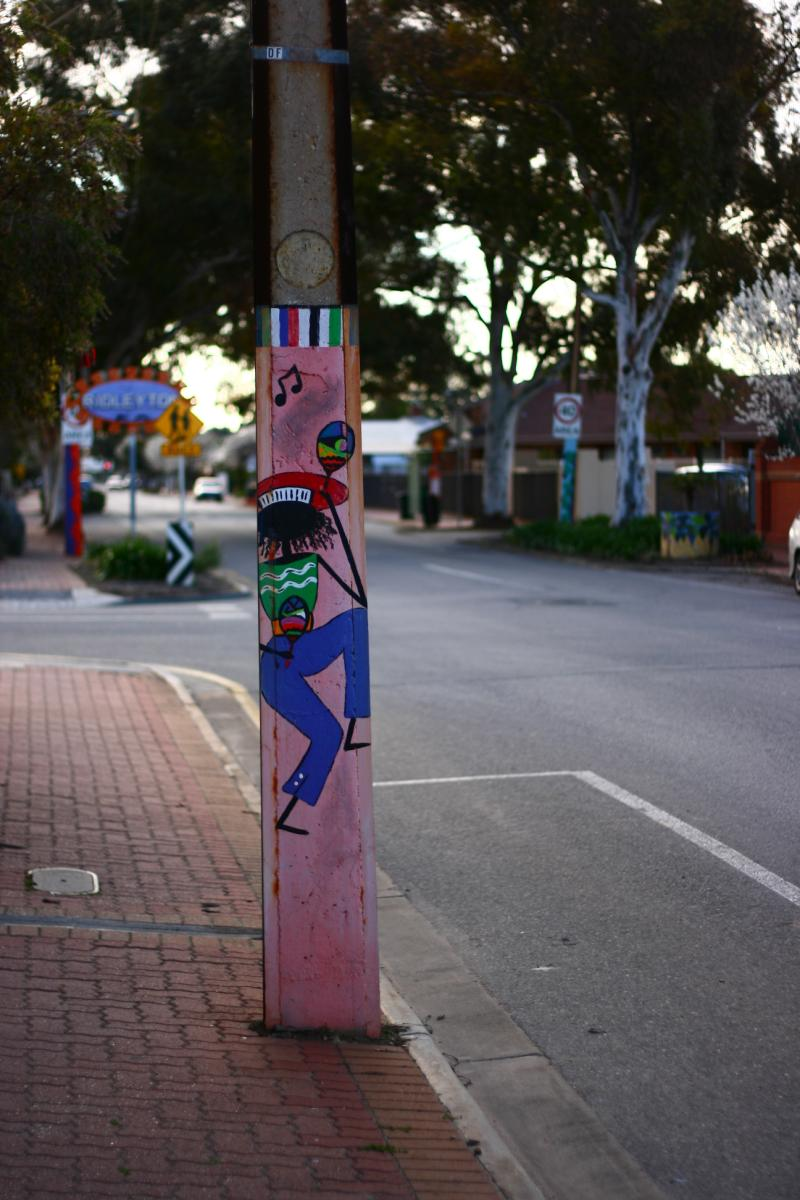

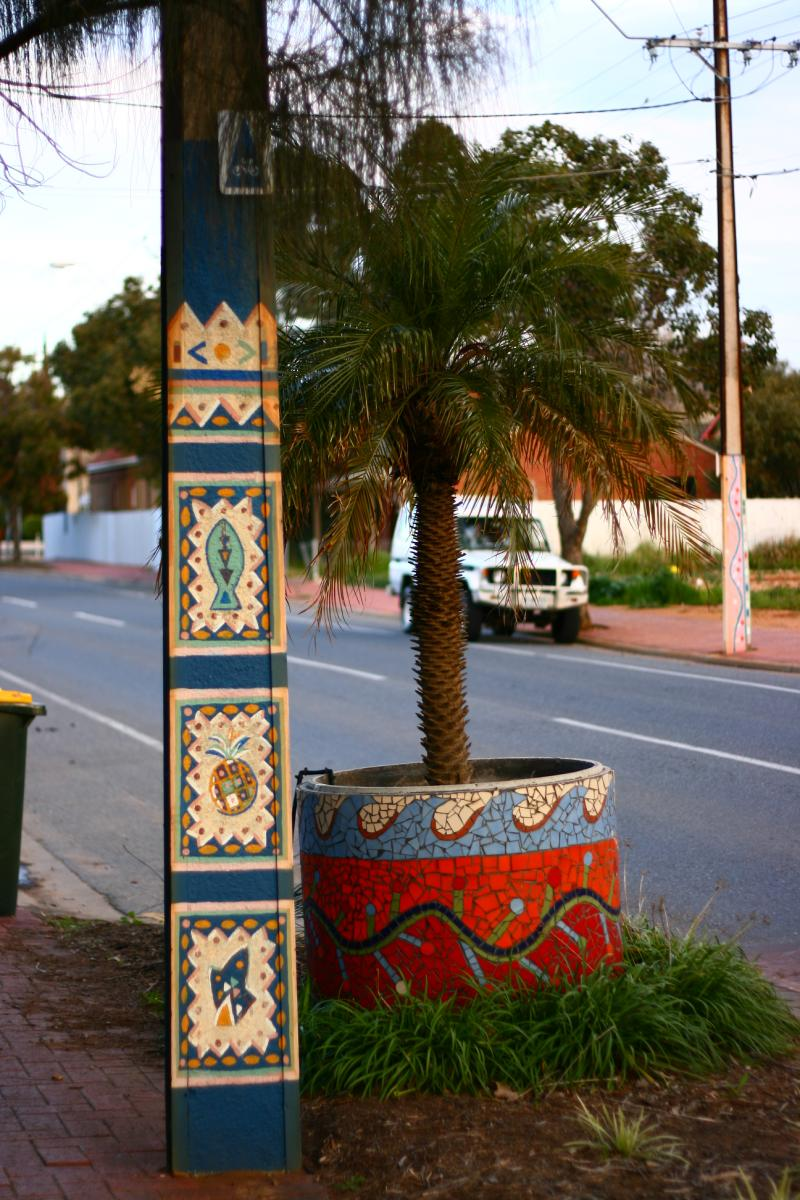

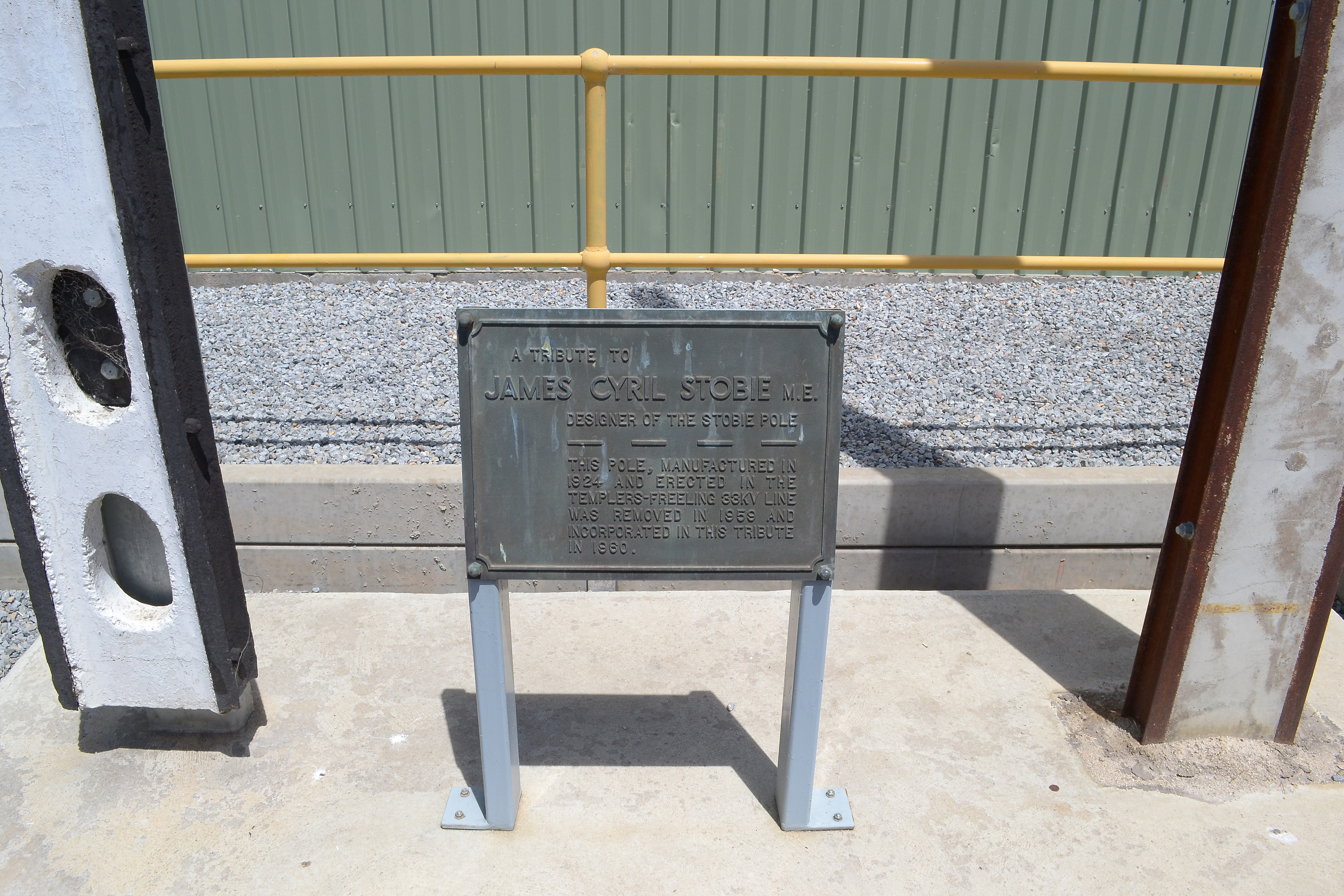

== See also ==
- Oppenheimer pole, a galvanised steel pole made in three telescopic sections for easy transport during the construction of the Australian Overland Telegraph Line in 1872.
