= Alice Hinton-Bateup =

Australian artist (born 1950)

Alice Hinton-Bateup (born 1950) is an Australian artist and print-maker. In the 1980s she was active in Garage Graphix Community Art Group, a print workshop in Mt. Druitt, Sydney, which included a number of Aboriginal artists. They produced posters that became important in the struggle for Aboriginal rights in Australia.

== Early life and education ==
Hinton-Bateup was born in 1950 in South Sydney Women's Hospital and identifies as an Aboriginal woman of the Kamilaroi and Wonnarua peoples.

She trained in silk and fabric screen printing at Garage Graphix and in 1983 began working for them.

Hinton-Bateup participated in four print exhibitions in the 1980s and in 2020 was included in the exhibition Know My Name at the National Gallery of Australia, an exhibition focused on female Australian Artists.

== Works ==
In the 1980s, Hinton-Bateup produced posters with very specific political messages. Some remain in the archive of art posters.

In 1986, she produced Dispossessed, that included text and focuses on the forced relocation of Aboriginal people and their loss of connection to Country.

That same year, she printed Peace, with images of three people above whom was a text that concludes there could be no peace without recognition of Aboriginal connection to the land.

In 1988, Hinton-Bateup participated in an Aboriginal parenting seminar sponsored by a regional public tenants council as a community art project. As a result, she produced a poster at Garage Graphix about Ruth Whitbourne, another Aboriginal woman.

== Collections ==
Hinton-Bateup's posters are included in the collections of the National Gallery of Australia in Canberra, Flinders University Art Museum in Adelaide, Powerhouse Museum in Sydney, and the Art Gallery of New South Wales in Sydney.
