= Alison Alder =

Australian artist (born 1958)

- Born: 1958 (age 67–68)
- Website: alisonalder.com

Alison Alder (born 1958) is an artist working predominantly within screen-printing media, technology-based works and "constructed environments" to explore social issues in Australia, including Indigenous Australian communities, and other organisations. She co-founded the Megalo International Silkscreen Collective with a collective of activists including Colin Little, the founder of Earthworks Poster Collective, in 1980.

== Career and practices ==
Born in 1958, Alison Alder works within multiple disciplines for her works including screen-printing, animation and installations. Her works have been exhibited throughout Australia, the United States and Asia since 1982. Her work is in the possession of many public and private holdings throughout the world including the Cruthers Collection of Women's Art which holds 13 works.

She received a Diploma of Arts from the Australian National University: School of Art and Design in Canberra in 1980. After graduating from ANU she completed a Graduate Diploma of Arts at Monash University, Victoria in 2002; she graduated from Monash University: Monash Art Design & Architecture, with a Masters of Fine Art in 2007.

Alder is currently an associate professor at Australian National University in Canberra and the Head of Printmedia and Drawing.

Alder's works centre around "empowering communities through the visualisation of common social aims." Her works focus on research of these communities which include institutions like the Museum of Australian Democracy and Indigenous communities. In a 1982 interview conducted by Anne Morris in Alder's book with Julia Church – True Bird Grit – Alder mentions that she created political posters because she is a printmaker, who could produce works that were inexpensive to make and circulate, which were more accessible than television to a wide population of people during that time.

== Works ==
Alder has been exhibiting works in group exhibitions since 1982 and has held 16 solo exhibitions. Her works are held in collections throughout the world including the Cruthers Collection of Women's Art, the National Gallery of Australia and the New York Public Library Print Collection.

- Alder’s When they close a pit they kill a community (1984) is one of the first works created for the KCC Women’s Auxiliary at Redback Graphix. She created a bright coloured poster that uses collage, including a woman figure wearing a yellow apron who holds a sign that states the title as well as “Support the K.C.C Women’s Auxiliary Community Action will Save our Jobs”. Many inspiring activists, feminist, and writers used Alder’s posters (including this one) in protests and newspaper publications against the issue of unemployed women in the 80s.
- Alder created Intervention (2008) in direct response to the Howard Government interventions in Indigenous Australian communities, especially in Tennant Creek. Intervention reflects the consequences of these interventions. One direct effect of these Government actions was "Income Management," where over half of a welfare recipient’s payments were withheld, and payments could only be spent at registered outlets. This was one of the pieces of legislation that was enforced in the Tennant Creek community. Intervention documents Alder’s direct response and perspective of these Government actions. It is a series of nine screen prints, currently held in the Cruthers Collection of Women's Art.
- Alder's Carcass (2009) consists of a series of screen prints of distorted and exaggerated carcasses, which draw from her experience of living in outback Australia. In 2010, Carcass won the Alice Prize. Drawing from Sidney Nolan’s 1953 work about Western Queensland droughts, Alder created works that in her mind commented on governmental policies that were put into place throughout Australia's history since being colonised and the inability to move "past a use and destroy mentality".
- Alder's work was exhibited in Making it New: Focus on Contemporary Australian Art in September 2009 at the Museum of Contemporary Art Australia. The exhibition focused on artists with a career spanning over 10 years, and highlighted works containing themes of tradition, regional history, politics and historical references. Spanning multiple mediums, the exhibit explored notions of studio-based artistic labour, especially within craft-based mediums. At the time of this exhibition, Alder had been creating works for over two decades.

== Solo exhibitions ==
1991

- A Country Show. aGOG, Australian Capital Territory.

1995

- Florals. aGOG, Australian Capital Territory.

1997

- Kujurra Mampaly Nyirrila. with Peggy Jones, aGOG and Telegraph Stn, Tennant Creek Northern Territory.

1998

- Kujurra Mampaly Nyirrila. with Peggy Jones, Araluen Centre, Northern Territory.

2000

- Road to Somewhere. Helen Maxwell Gallery, Australian Capital Territory.

2004

- Drink. Helen Maxwell Gallery, Australian Capital Territory.

2007

- Outback. Helen Maxwell Gallery, Australian Capital.

2009

- Carcass. Helen Maxwell Gallery, Australian Capital Territory.
- Cutting History. Helen Maxwell Gallery, Australian Capital Territory.

2010

- Cutting History: 2. Kala Art Institute, Berkeley, California, USA.

2011/12

- Dirty Water. Canberra Contemporary Art Space, Australian Capital Territory.

2013

- Cutting Out Stories of Lanyon. Lanyon Homestead, Australian Capital Territory.

2014

- Carcass. Canberra Museum and Gallery, Australian Capital Territory.

2015

- Death of a Broadsheet. Megalo Gallery, Australian Capital Territory.

2017

- One to Eight. Museum of Australian Democracy. Old Parliament House, Australian Capital Territory.

2018/19

- Newscrap. Canberra Contemporary Art Space, ACT.
