= Toni Robertson =

Australian artist (born 1953

Toni Robertson (born 1953) is a visual artist, art historian and printmaker from Sydney, Australia. She is known for her poster making and involvement in the Earthworks Poster Collective, which operated out of the "Tin Shed" art workshops at the University of Sydney.

== Early life and education ==
Toni Robertson was born in 1953.

== Career ==
Robertson joined the Earthworks Poster Collective alongside Mark Arbuz and Chips Mackinolty in 1974. This Collective existed from 1972 until 1979, and utilised screen printing and poster-making to create political artworks and posters. These creations covered a wide array of contemporary issues, including the Australian feminist movement, Indigenous Australian and LGBT rights, environmental and unemployment issues, and anti-nuclear concerns.

She became a member of the feminist activist group "Women Behind Bars", and became one of the group's artists in residence. While in this role she contributed several posters and artworks to the public campaign for a repeal in the Violet and Bruce Roberts' murder trial during the 1980s.

Robertson also became a key member within the Sydney Women's Art Movement, along with feminist contemporaries such as Barbara Hall, Frances Phoenix, Beverley Garlick, Jude Adams and Vivienne Binns. Her work was often responding to the political situation at the time, using posters and banners. This was helped by Robertson's skill in screen printing, which made it able to easily spread and visualize political messages.

She also became an art historian.

She retired from the art world as a result of health concerns from chemical exposure during her time as a tutor at the Tin Shed.

== Works ==
Robertson's work is held in several prominent Australian galleries, including the Museum of Applied Arts and Science, The Art Gallery of New South Wales, The National Gallery of Australia and the Caruthers Collection of Women's Art. Her works often consisted of staged photographs that are layered using different inks and colors to create striking images that were important to her political themes and concepts that are associated with her work. These concepts of feminism were important in her work, she was present in a protest that involved the University of Sydney, which focused on the Philosophy Department rejecting the introduction of a course on "Philosophical aspects of feminist thought." She succeeded in these protests with the university giving in to the demands of the participants, Robertson continued to include these themes within her works. Robertson was quoted in "Sites of Power: an exhibition of posters and prints by Toni Robertson," saying "I think my work is very quirky. It’s very much individual politics. If you’re going to spend much of your life battling against the status quo you may as well find ways of getting a great deal of pleasure out of it. So it has to amuse me and I hope its humour entices people to look at it," which is relevant within her body of work.

- The women cashiers at Target (Taking Marketown by strategy series) 1976–1977
- It won't be long now (Taking Marketown by strategy series) 1953.
- The grenades are inside the frozen chickens (Taking Marketown by strategy series) 1976–1977.
- Anniversary, print (1987)

== Exhibitions ==
- Women in the Sheds (1970s–1980s)
- Women at Watters (1955)- Out of the Void: Mad and Bad Women. Art from the Collection of the Queensland Art Gallery (1955)
- Review (1955)
- In the Company of Women: 100 years of Australian women's art from the Caruthers collection (1995)
