= Garage Graphix =

Australian artists group

Garage Graphix was an Australian community group of women artists, active between 1981 and 1998. It included an Aboriginal Arts Program (1983 - 1984), which was led by Aboriginal arts workers, and it was the first of its kind in Australia; it employed Alice Hinton-Bateup and undertook commissions and design work for Aboriginal organisations around Sydney.

== History ==
Based in Mount Druitt, Sydney, Garage Graphix was a community group of women artists committed to creating a space for members to freely express their cultural heritage and identity and it was established with support from Blacktown City Council. It evolved from Mt Druitt Street Art Workers, a loose art collective who created various community mural projects in Lethbridge Park in 1981 and hosted cultural events.

In 1981 a Management Committee was formed and was created in the garage of an opera singer and it was adjacent to the community centre. The development was described by early key members and coordinators as follows:

Garage Graphix was.. developed by arts workers active in the women's movement, who were committed to working with and for communities to facilitate expression of their values and beliefs: to illuminate issues of concern. A collective in its early days. Garage Graphix became and incorporated entity in 1982. It was governed by a management committee comprising local residents and community works providing communities throughout western Sydney with access to specialist skills, printmaking equipment and facilities

— Lin Mountstephen and Marla Guppy, 2019, Text supplied by Blacktown Arts Centre, Significance Assessment: Garage Graphix Community Art Workshop Poster Archive, 2021

A screen printing workshop and design space, the "Garage" produced political and affirmative action posters during the 1980s related to Indigenous Land Rights, Indigenous Women's rights, and other women's rights issues. Garage Graphix exhibited along with Redback Graphix at University Fine Arts Gallery in 1988 in an exhibition titled Shocking Diversity.

The "Garage" operated on the principle that "the people of Western Sydney have the right to play an active role in the way their culture develops". Facilities provided included a photocopier, photographic darkroom, process camera, layout and design area, screen printing workshop, and t-shirt printing "jig".

It closed due to a number of factors including a loss of key staff, a reduced focus and funding from government and screen-printing beginning to be viewed as 'old technology'.

When the Garage closed its archives, including objects, records and approximately 400 posters, were placed in storage at Blacktown City Council. In 2021, through the assistance of a Community Heritage Grant, made available by the National Library of Australia, a significance assessment of this collection was completed.

The Powerhouse Museum holds over 50 prints by Garage Graphix in its collection including Dispossessed (1980s) a poster by Alice Hinton-Bateup. This work includes text and focuses on the forced relocation of Aboriginal people (Kamilaroi/Wonnarua) and their loss of connection to Country. Hinton-Bateup's Ruth's Story (1988) is included in the National Gallery of Australia's travelling exhibition Know My Name which aims to increase the representation of women artists.
