= Joan Grounds =

American-born artist

Joan Grounds (Dickson)
- Born: 31 August 1939 (age 86); Atlanta, USA
- Education: Bachelor of Arts (Tulane University); Master of Arts (University of California, Berkeley)
- Known for: Sculpture, ceramics, performance art, film
- Movement: Multi disciplinary

Joan Grounds (born 31 August 1939) is an American-born artist based in Melbourne. She has been exhibiting in Australia and internationally from 1967. Her solo and collaborative artwork is held in the National Gallery of Australia (ceramics), the National Gallery of Victoria (both film and ceramics) and in the Powerhouse Museum of Arts and Applied Sciences (ceramics). Her hybrid practice incorporated ceramics, sculpture, sound art, film and performance art.

== Early life and education ==
Grounds was born in Atlanta, United States, in 1939. She obtained a Bachelor of Fine Arts from Tulane University in 1962 and a Master of Arts from the University of California, Berkeley in 1964.

After meeting and marrying American/Australian artist Marr Grounds, she lived in Ghana for two years while he lectured in architecture at the Kwame Nkrumah University of Science and Technology in Kumasi.

She exhibited in Ghana and the US before coming to Australia in 1968.

== Career ==
Grounds's first major installation work was a fire sculpture on a beach in Ghana in 1968, later repeated at Wattamolla Beach in New South Wales. She would continue to engage with nature in later site-specific installation work, including the "Four Quartets" in 1987-1988.

Grounds was the director of the Tin Sheds at Sydney University from 1976 to 1979, after co-founding the art workshop with her husband and Donald Brook. Grounds fostered the Tin Sheds as a vibrant hub for a diversity of politically active artists, students and the broader community and it supported many sub-groups.

She taught at East Sydney Technical College (later the National Art School) at that time, and later taught at the College of Fine Arts, UNSW.

== Art practice ==
The Watter Gallery in Sydney has represented her work.

=== Collaborations ===
Grounds collaborated with Aleks Danko on several performance and film projects and had a ten-year collaboration with Sherre Delys, producing sound sculpture and public art installation. Other collaborators were N.S. Harsha, Rik Rue, Margaret Dodd, Stevie Wishhart, and Jane Finlay.

=== Themes ===
"Joan Grounds' work...engages with nature, with the placement of women, with the body of women, with memory and with ways of exploring all of these." (Julie Ewington, 2001)

"The installations are as formal and elusive as music. And you are the music while the music lasts." (George Alexander, 1989)

== Recognition ==
- 2002 ASIALINK Residency, Chiang Mai, Thailand
- 1996 ASIALINK Visual Arts and Crafts residency exchange between India and Australia
- 1995 Australia Council residency, Tokyo, Japan
- 1981 Australia Council residency, Greene Street, New York

== Selected exhibitions ==
=== Solo exhibitions ===
- 1985 'Four Quartets', The Performance Space, Cleveland Street, Sydney
- 1997 (with N.S. Harsha) Art Gallery of NSW
- 1995 solo show, Annandale Galleries, Sydney

=== Others ===
- Asia Pacific Triennial of Contemporary Art 2002 (APT 2002|APT4), Brisbane, Australia

== Collections ==
- National Gallery of Australia (10 works, including Red-green duration: from the portfolio "Rare birds with sticky wings")
- National Gallery of Victoria (4 works, including We should call it a living room and Package)
- Powerhouse Museum, Sydney (several, including Ceramic parcel)
