= Vivienne Binns =

Australian artist (1940–2026)

Vivienne Binns OAM
- Born: Vivienne Joyce Binns; 6 December 1940; Wyong, New South Wales, Australia
- Died: 1 August 2026 (aged 85); Canberra, Australian Capital Territory, Australia
- Education: National Art School
- Notable work: Vag Dens
- Movement: Women's Art Movement
- Awards: Order of Australia Medal (1983)

Vivienne Joyce Binns OAM (6 December 1940 – 1 August 2026) was an Australian artist known for her contribution to the Women's Art Movement in Australia, her engagement with feminism in her artwork, and her active advocacy within community arts. She worked predominantly in painting.

== Early life ==
Binns was born in Wyong, New South Wales, Australia, on 6 December 1940. She was the youngest of five children of her parents Joyce and Norman. Norman had enlisted in the army six months prior to Vivienne's birth and spent the majority of five years serving in the Middle East and Papua New Guinea, while Joyce and the children lived in Young, New South Wales. In 1945, following the end of the war, the Binns family returned to Sydney, where Binns grew up, first in Willoughby then Wollstonecraft.

From 1953, Binns attended North Sydney Girls High School. She later pursued her tertiary education in art at the National Art School from 1958 to 1962. After her graduation, Binns stayed on campus and took on a teaching role in the drawing department. She never conformed to traditional gender roles, and, during a time of "initial, intense, introversion", was questioning her sexuality as well as interrogating the philosophies and ideas in making art, in particular Dadaism.

== Career ==
Binns' first solo exhibition Vivienne Binns: Paintings and Constructions was held at Watters Gallery in Sydney in 1967. Her most well-known painting, Vag Dens, featuring a brightly-coloured vagina with teeth, was hung alongside Phallic Monument, which featured male genitals. Some critics excoriated her work, using phrases such as "monumental repulsion", "pure obscene horror", "the most disturbing artwork I've ever seen". Artist and critic Elwyn Lynn wrote that her work "affronts masculinity".

After this show, Binns felt that she needed a break from painting, and became involved in community arts. In 1973, Binns worked as a field officer for the Community Arts Program, an Australia Council initiative, visiting regional areas to "investigate needs, resources and possibilities" and doing a huge amount to stimulate and promote community arts. She started working with vitreous enamel and other mediums formerly regarded as "crafts" rather than art.

She was influenced by and became a friend of visiting US feminist art critic Lucy Lippard in 1975, afterwards visiting New York City and connecting with the women's art movement there.

In 1979, she began her artist-in-residence program at the University of New South Wales, followed by artist-in-community placements in a range of locations across New South Wales from 1980 to 1988.

From the late 1980s Binns taught painting and drawing at the University of Sydney Art Workshop, the Tin Sheds. In 1994 she taught painting and drawing at Charles Sturt University at Albury. She then moved to Canberra to take up a lecturing position at the Canberra School of Art (later amalgamated with the Australian National University as the ANU Institute of the Arts), teaching several subjects.

In 1990 Binns travelled to central Australia and learnt some of the creation stories, art and culture from Pitjantjara women. Also in 1990, she was awarded an Australian Arts Creative Fellowship, enabling her to undertake a three-year research project about the cultural link between Australia and the Asia-Pacific. In 1991, Binns spent time in Tokyo on an Australia Council residency, and later attended three South Pacific Festivals of the Arts, in Rarotonga (1992), Western Samoa (1996) and Noumea (2000). These led to a significant amount of work which included references to Captain James Cook and the artists who travelled with him, and incorporating patterns of tapa cloth, the traditional bark cloth of the Pacific region.

In 1995 she started producing her extensive series entitled In Memory of the Unknown Artist, honouring the artistic endeavours of people not generally considered to be artists, such as designers of fabric, linoleum, carpet and bathroom tiles; housewives; traditional craftspeople; street artists and hobby artists. She continued to create artworks in this series through the 2000s.

In 2000, she was resident in the Australia Council Studio in London and, in 2001, again visited Europe assisted by an ANU Faculties Research Grant.

In 2002 Binns travelled to the Kimberleys, afterwards including imagery relating to the landscape of the area, sometimes combined with Cook-related imagery and patterned surfaces. In 2003, she collaborated with Geoff Newton and Derek O'Connor on a series of split canvases.

Binns retired from teaching in 2012.

She held a solo exhibition It Is What It Is at the Sutton Gallery, by whom she was represented, in Melbourne in 2018.

In 2019 Vivienne Binns was interviewed in a digital story and oral history for the State Library of Queensland's James C Sourris AM Collection. In the interview Binns talked about her life, her art and her inspirations.

As of March 2022, aged 81, she still worked and painted in her studio, although at a slower pace and sometimes intermittently; she had one painting on the go for two years.

A major survey exhibition of her work entitled Vivienne Binns: On and through the Surface opened at MUMA (Monash University Museum of Art) on 5 February 2022, finishing up there in April and starting a run at the Museum of Contemporary Art Australia in Sydney in July. The exhibition included more than 100 works, including prints, sculpture and drawing as well as her earliest paintings.

== Death ==
Binns died in Canberra on 1 August 2026, at the age of 85.

== Art practice ==
Binns worked across many media, including painting, printmaking, performance, sculpture and drawing. Her diverse range of artistic engagements resulted in her being well respected amongst her Australian and global contemporaries, particularly within the feminist community.

=== Painting ===
Throughout the span of her practice, Binns developed a strong reputation for her prolific approach to painting. Her first solo exhibition Vivienne Binns: Paintings and Constructions, was held in 1967 at Watters Gallery in Sydney. Including notable works such as Vag Dens and Phallic Monument, this exhibition has been recognised as a key starting point for the development of feminist art in Australia. This exhibition was one of the first of its kind, predating Judy Chicago's The Dinner Party and "critically affirming the power of women's sexuality whilst also provoking... a good measure of castration anxiety amongst the patriarchy".

Through decades of experimentation with colour and form, Binns conceptually explored ideas ranging from feminism to colonial critique within her painting practice. Binns utilised abstraction as a way to communicate complex ideas and make them accessible to a broader audience.

== Women's Art Movement ==
Alongside feminist contemporaries such as Barbara Hall, Frances Phoenix (nee Budden), Beverly Garlick, Jude Adams and Toni Robertson, Binns was at the forefront of the development of The Women's Art Movement (WAM) in Sydney. Beginning in 1973 and inspired by Linda Nochlin's essay "Why Have There Been No Great Women Artists?", WAM aimed to address discrimination and sexism within the art world through various actions and exhibitions. Binns was a founding member in 1974. WAM was particularly dedicated to the documentation of women's artwork through the development of the Women's Art Register.

Feminism and the Women's Art Movement served as a political undercurrent for much of Binns' practice:

...as a feminist I became aware that the heritage of women was not readily available to us, was not obviously recorded and was certainly not taught in the schools.

== Community art ==
Binns was a prominent figure in the development of community arts in Australia. In 1972 she collaborated with Mike Morris and Tim Burns on The Artsmobile, a travelling community arts project that brought Dada and Surrealist style performance work to centres along the north east coast of NSW. Described as "the offspring of a marriage between Fluxus and a local town council bookmobile", the Artsmobile brought a variety of art-based activities to schools, seniors centres and public parks.

Continuing with her interest in community arts and also related to the questions raised by the Women's Art Movement, Binns developed Mothers' Memories, Others' Memories in 1978 during her artist's residency at the University of New South Wales. Beginning with staff and students of the university, Binns later expanded the project to the Sydney suburb of Blacktown, where she worked closely with Patricia Parker, a community officer at the Blacktown City Council. Mothers' Memories, Others' Memories recalled the "lives of women and their means of expression in the domestic sphere", through facilitating a space where participants could come and share stories of the various craft and needlework skills that they had been taught by their mothers and other members of their family. Described as "dense, fragmented, [and] multilayered" the final work was exhibited as a series of postcards installed on a postcard rack. The project continued until 1981.

In 1983, Binns began work on her next major community art project Full Flight. Travelling and living in a caravan for two years in the Central West region of New South Wales, Binns stayed for two to four months in each town facilitating workshops, mural painting and skill sharing. This project celebrated "the creativity of ordinary people".

Her interest in community arts came primarily from an urge to make the art world accessible to everyone beyond the constraints of art institutions. Binns believed that creative expression was an inherent part of the human experience, and not allowing for this expression freely was a form of "social control":

I am primarily interested in breaking down the distinctions between the art of artists and art institutions on one hand, and the art expression of people in general on the other...The approach I used was an attempt to take a positive step towards undermining the Australian cultural cringe and the oppressive effect of values pertaining to separate, aloof and elite art forms.

In 1989, Binns began another community art project, The Tower of Babel, at the Watters Gallery. It started with 50 small dioramas, created by herself as well as friends, mentors, students and acquaintances, including Irene Maher, Mike Brown, Ruth Waller, Bonita Ely and Eugene Carchesio. The project is still ongoing as of 2022, when it comprised 90 boxes.

In 1991, Binns was the general editor of Community and the Arts: History, Theory, Practice, a collection of essays which served as a "theoretical text for community practitioners in the arts".

== Recognition and awards ==
According to the Australia Council, "Binns was one of the first artists in Australia to critically engage with feminism and pioneered dialogues between Australian art and international feminism".

In 1983, Binns was awarded an Order of Australia Medal for services to art and craft. She was also awarded the Ros Bower Memorial Award for visionary contribution to Community Arts in 1985.

In 1990, she was awarded an Australian Arts Creative Fellowship, which financed her three-year research project about the cultural link between Australia and the Asia-Pacific.

Her work was selected for invitational prizes such as the John McCaughey Memorial Prize (2008) and Clemenger Contemporary Art Award (2009) at the National Gallery of Victoria.

In 2021, Binns was the recipient of an Australia Council Award for Visual Arts.

== Exhibitions ==
Binns' work was displayed at many exhibitions spanning over fifty years of art practice, including:

=== Solo exhibitions ===
- 1967 Paintings and Constructions, Watters Gallery, Sydney
- 1971 Funky Enamel Ashtrays, Watters Gallery, Sydney
- 1973 Enamel Panels, University of Tasmania, Hobart and Raffins Gallery, Orange, New South Wales
- 1985 Watters Gallery, Sydney
- 1990 Drawings of God, Tower of Babel, Bellas Gallery, Brisbane
- 1992 Sutton Gallery, Melbourne
- 1994 Surfacing in the Pacific, Bellas Gallery, Brisbane
- 1995 Pacific Strands, Australian Girls' Own Gallery (aGOG), Canberra
- 1996 Slicing History in the Pacific, Bellas Gallery, Brisbane
- 1996 In Memory of the Unknown Artist and Others, Watters Gallery, Sydney
- 1999 PATTERNING: In Memory of Unknown Artists, Sutton Gallery, Melbourne
- 1999 TRANSLATIONS: Remembering Unknown Artists, Bellas Gallery, Brisbane
- 1999 Rocks and Relics: Cook to Lake Cargelligo, The Cube, Canberra Contemporary Art Space, Canberra
- 2004 Vivienne Binns: Twenty First Century Paintings, curated by Merryn Gates, The Cross Art Projects, Sydney
- 2005 Some New, Some Old, Some Collaborations, Sutton Gallery, Melbourne
- 2006–8 Vivienne Binns, touring exhibition curated by Merryn Gates, Tasmanian Museum and Art Gallery, Hobart; The Drill Hall Gallery, Australian National University, Canberra; Penrith Regional Gallery, Penrith, NSW; and Bathurst Regional Gallery, Bathurst, NSW
- 2008 Everything New is Old Again, Sutton Gallery, Melbourne
- 2012 Vivienne Binns, Art and Life (mini –Survey), curated by Penny Peckham, La Trobe University Museum of Art, Melbourne
- 2018 It is what it is what it is, Sutton Gallery, Melbourne
- 2022 Vivienne Binns: On and through the Surface, MUMA, Melbourne, then Museum of Contemporary Art Australia, Sydney

=== Group exhibitions ===
- 1971 Woom, environmental lightshow with Roger Foley (Ellis D Fogg), Watters Gallery, Sydney
- 1972 The Jo Bonomo Story - A Show of Strength, a group happening, Watters Gallery, Sydney
- 1978 An exhibition of work by homosexual and lesbian artists, Watters Gallery, Sydney
- 1980 Mothers' Memories, Others' Memories, Blacktown artist in community and participation project, Watters Gallery, Sydney; Ewing and George Paton Galleries, University of Melbourne, Melbourne
- 1981 Australian Perspecta, Art Gallery of New South Wales, Sydney
- 1981-83 Full-Flight, artist-in-community in the central western region of NSW
- 1982 Biennale of Sydney, Art Gallery of New South Wales, Sydney
- 1987 Contemporary Art in Australia A Review, Museum of Contemporary Art, South Brisbane
- 1991 Frames of Reference: Aspects of Feminism and Art, Pier 4/5, Sydney
- 1996 Women Hold Up Half the Sky: The Orientation of Art in the Post-War Pacific, MUMA, Melbourne
- 1997 I had a Dream: Australian Art in the 1960s, National Gallery of Victoria, Melbourne
- 1998 Patterning: Layers of Meaning in Contemporary Art, curated by Merryn Gates, touring to Canberra; Bandung, Jakarta, Ubud, Yogyakarta, Indonesia; Lahore, Pakistan; and Manila, Philippines
- 2000 On the Brink: Abstraction in the 90’s, Heide Museum of Modern Art, Melbourne
- 2007 Cross Currents: Focus on Contemporary Australian Art, Museum of Contemporary Art, Sydney
- 2012 Sixties Explosion, Macquarie University Art Gallery, Sydney
- 2014 Binns + Valamanesh, Casula Powerhouse, Sydney
- 2015 Pop to Popism, Art Gallery of New South Wales, Sydney
- 2017–18 Unfinished Business: Perspectives on Art & Feminism, Australian Centre for Contemporary Art, Melbourne

== Major collections ==
Her work is represented in private collections as well as in many major collections, including:

- Art Gallery of New South Wales, Sydney
- Art Gallery of Western Australia, Perth
- Australian National University, Canberra
- BHP, Melbourne
- Canberra Museum and Gallery, Canberra
- Griffith University Art Collection, Queensland
- Ian Potter Museum of Art, Melbourne.
- Kohlberg Kravis Roberts
- Monash University Museum of Art (MUMA), Melbourne
- National Gallery of Australia, Canberra
- National Gallery of Victoria, Melbourne
- Newcastle Art Gallery, Newcastle, New South Wales
- Parliament House Art Collection, Canberra
- Perc Tucker Regional Gallery, Townsville, Queensland
- Queensland Art Gallery, Brisbane
- University Art Gallery, Queensland University, Brisbane
- University of Western Australia, Cruthers Collection of Women's Art
- Wesfarmers, Perth
