= Chips Mackinolty =

Australian artist

Chips Mackinolty (born 12 March 1954) is an Australian artist. He was involved in the campaigns against Australian participation in the war in Vietnam by producing posters, and was a key figure in the radical poster movement. In 1990 he co-founded, with Peter Cook and Therese Ritchie, Green Ant Research and Publishing. He also worked in public service roles and as a journalist.

== Early life ==
Chips Mackinolty was born on 12 March 1954 in Morwell, Victoria.

== Art career ==
During the 1970s posters became an art form, with artists using the cheap posters as a political tool. The Earthworks Poster Collective, established in 1971, was the most active and well-known of these groups. Earthworks operated from the Sydney University Art Workshop, commonly known as the Tin Sheds.

Mackinolty was introduced to screen printing in Goulburn Street, Sydney.

In 1978 Mackinolty designed a poster to commemorate Prime Minister Robert Menzies' death, to reflect a working-class view on the prime minister, and the "Pig Iron Bob" nickname that was given to him during the Dalfram dispute of 1938.

Mackinolty used sharp, flat colours, and increasingly professional techniques to produce posters such as "For the man who said life wasn't meant to be easy – make life impossible". The poster is a multi-imaged send-up of former Australian Prime Minister Malcolm Fraser. It was posted up at night around Sydney, helping to politicise a generation.

== Public service roles ==
With the dissolution of Earthworks Poster Collective in 1980, Mackinolty moved first to Townsville, North Queensland, where he worked as a community arts officer from 1981 to 1985.

He then moved to the Northern Territory, where he worked as an art adviser to Aboriginal art centres in Katherine. (Mimi Aboriginal Arts and Crafts, 1981–1985) and Mutitjulu (Maruku Arts, 1985). From then until 1990 he worked at the Northern Land Council in Darwin as a journalist, designer, and field officer. He produced a number of posters in that period under the name Jalak Graphics, although most were printed at Redback Graphics in Wollongong and Sydney. Many used Aboriginal languages in their text.

In 1990 Mackinolty, with Peter Cook and Therese Ritchie, co-founded Green Ant Research Arts and Publishing. He also accepted assignments from the Country Liberal Party (CLP) government, including the euthanasia education program. He also acted as a go-between, liaising between the CLP government and the Jawoyn people, who are the traditional owners of Katherine.

Mackinolty was employed as an advisor to the Northern Territory Labor government from 2002 to 2009, under various ministers, then quit to work for the Aboriginal Medical Service Northern Territory in Darwin, followed by the Aboriginal Medical Services Alliance Northern Territory in Alice Springs as a policy worker.

From 2016 until 2019 he lived in Palermo, Italy, where he worked on producing digitally illustrated imagery.

== Journalist ==
As well as graphic design, Mackinolty worked as a correspondent for newspapers, including the Sydney Morning Herald, The Age, The Australian and The Bulletin. He has been an occasional correspondent for Crikey, particularly its arts section, and has also contributed articles to The Monthly.

== Awards ==
Along with colleague Therese Ritchie, in 2000 Mackinolty was a joint winner with Bede Tungatalum, of the Fremantle Print Award.

In 2010 he won the 4th Togart Award worth $15,000, for Contemporary Visual Art.

== Exhibitions ==
Work in the 1990s included a controversial exhibition of posters with Ritchie, entitled If you see this exhibition you'll know we have been murdered, which was criticised by the CLP government in 1998.

In 2010, again with Ritchie, he held a retrospective at Charles Darwin University, Not Dead Yet.

His 2016 exhibition The Wealth of the Land was launched in Palermo, Sicily.

As of 2017 he was continuing to exhibit art in the Northern Territory, interstate, and internationally.

== Collections ==
His work is held in many major galleries in Australia, including:

- National Gallery of Australia
- National Museum of Australia
- Artbank
- Art Gallery of NSW
- National Gallery of Victoria
- Museum and Art Gallery of the Northern Territory
- Charles Darwin University
- Australian War Memorial
- Art Gallery of South Australia
- National Library of Australia
- Australian Centre for the Moving Image

Internationally, his work can be found in the National Library of New Zealand, Médiathèque de silos in Chaumont, France; the Museum of Modern Art in New York; and in private collections abroad.
