= Women's Art Movement =

Australian feminist art movement, 1970s-1980s

The Women's Art Movement (WAM) was an Australian feminist art movement, founded in Sydney in 1974, Melbourne in 1974, and Adelaide in 1976 (as the Women's Art Group, or WAG).

== Background ==
Such movements had already been created in other countries, in which women artists looked at their position as women in society and their position as artists through a feminist framework. The visit by U.S. feminist art critic Lucy Lippard in 1975 provided the immediate impetus for the creation of the new movement in Australia. She spoke to women-only groups in Melbourne and Adelaide about the creation of archives of women artists' work on photographic slides, known as slide registers, by a network of American women artists who called themselves the West-East Bag (WEB); the idea was to counteract their lack of showing in art galleries.

Run as collectives, the groups facilitated consciousness-raising studio and exhibition workshops, aiming to analyse the political implications of personal experiences in visual art. Like their international counterparts, the groups used non-judgemental consciousness-raising (CR) methods which had grown from women's liberation movement. By the mid-1980s, the WAM was a highly respected art movement, both across Australia and worldwide.

== Melbourne ==
The 1974 exhibition A Room of One’s Own: Three Women Artists, co-curated by Kiffy Rubbo, Lynne Cook and Janine Burke, helped initiate the Melbourne WAM. The following year, Rubbo commissioned Burke to curate the national touring exhibition Australian Women Artists 1840–1940. The gallery hosted international feminist art critic, Lucy Lippard, who delivered a talk to a women-only audience. Melbourne's Women's Art Forum and Women's Art Register were subsequently established in the gallery.

== Sydney ==
Beginning with its first meeting in April 1974 and inspired by Linda Nochlin’s essay "Why Have There Been No Great Women Artists?", the Sydney WAM, founded in 1975, aimed to address discrimination and sexism within the art world through various actions and exhibitions.

Marie McMahon was a founding member, Vivienne Binns, Barbara Hall, Frances Phoenix, Beverley Garlick, Jude Adams and Toni Robertson, were at the forefront of the development of The Women's Art Movement in Sydney.

== Adelaide ==
In Adelaide, the Women's Art Group was established in 1976 or 1977 (initially in 1976 as the Women's Art Group or WAG, which aimed to set up a slide register as Melbourne WAM had done), co-founded by Ann Newmarch (who had also been a founding member of the Adelaide Progressive Art Movement in 1974), in order to support and promote women artists, and to work together to combat sexism in the arts and society. Fifty women of a wide range of ages attended the first meeting. For the whole month of August 1977, it hosted The Women's Show, which was a national event in both scope and participation. Hosted by the Experimental Art Foundation, it included theatre, music, film, photography, poetry and literature, media, a conference and a visual art exhibition, and included over 350 works, curated by Julie Ewington (as of 2021 on the board of the 4A Centre for Contemporary Asian Art in Sydney), and Helen James. Participating artists included Stephanie Radok, Loene Furler, Bonita Ely, Jude Adams, Margaret Dodd, Frances Budden (later Phoenix), Marie McMahon, and many others.

WAM members included Anne Marsh, Frances Phoenix, Jenny Boult, Polly Siems, Jane Kew, Kate Millington, Phil McKillup, and Jacky Redgate was actively involved.

Some time after its establishment, the Adelaide group gained some funding from the South Australia Arts Grant Advisory Committee, the Community Arts Board, and the Visual Arts Board. This funding allowed for the publication of the book Women's Art Movement 1978-1979, Adelaide, South Australia, in 1980.

There was also a strong Aboriginal women's art component, and its constitution was altered to reflect this. Adelaide members exhibited their work in other states, and some went abroad: Jane Kent and Anne Marsh went to California in 1984 to look at performance art, publishing a book on their findings afterwards. The group was involved in a diverse range of activities including the Adelaide Festival of Arts and its Adelaide Writers' Week, and supported artists-in-residence such as Jill Orr and Bettye Saar.

The State Library of South Australia holds records pertaining to the Adelaide branch between 1974 and 1986 in its collection.

== See also ==
- George Paton Gallery
