= Earthworks Poster Collective =

Australian artist collective

The Earthworks Poster Collective was an Australian artist collective that operated out of the Sydney University Art Workshop, more commonly known as the Tin Sheds, in the 1970s. The collective, based in Sydney, New South Wales, was active from 1972 to 1979.

== History ==
The collective produced mainly screen-printed, political posters that sought to promote the rights of Aboriginal people, LGBT people, women, the unemployed and workers, including the posters for the exhibition The D'Oyley Show (1979) by the Women's Domestic Needlepoint Group. It also produced anti-nuclear, protest posters.

Earthworks Poster Collective disbanded in 1979, after failing to attract the funding needed to continue.

Today the Collective is regarded as having been the principal driving force in the early development of Australian political poster art during the 1970s. Works produced by the collective are held within the collections of The State Library of New South Wales, National Gallery of Australia, Queensland Art Gallery, the Powerhouse Museum, and the University of Sydney.

== People ==
- Michael Callaghan
- Jan Mackay
- Chips Mackinolty
- Marie McMahon
- Toni Robertson

== See also ==
- Australian poster collectives
- Women's Domestic Needlework Group
