= Marie McMahon =

Australian female artist

Marie Elizabeth Rita McMahon (born September 1953) is an Australian artist, known for her paintings, prints, posters, drawings, and design work. Born in Melbourne, she has worked in various communities of Australian Aboriginal people and as of 2020 works in Sydney. Her work has focused on social, political, and environmental issues. Her posters about Aboriginal rights and Aboriginal life appear in major gallery collections in Australia.

== Biography ==
McMahon was born in Melbourne, Australia, in September 1953. She grew up on Australian Air Force bases in Darwin, Australia, at Richmond near Sydney, and at HMAS Albatross, a naval base on the South Coast of New South Wales. During the 1960s her family lived in the Philippines until they returned to Sydney.

In 1976, McMahon joined the Earthworks Poster Collective at the Tin Sheds Art Workshop located on the campus of the University of Sydney. While working there she contributed to a catalogue of posters that "were sometimes didactic and often provocative".

Recruited with other screen printers by the Aboriginal Arts Board, in 1980 she went to the Northern Territory to work at Tiwi Designs. Later in the 1980s Marie worked as a designer at Redback Graphix in Wollongong and Sydney, where she produced well-known posters related to health issues for Aboriginal and Torres Strait Islander people.

== Works ==
As a printer she has produced etchings, linocuts, lithographs, and screen prints.

Among her many well-known posters are You are on Aboriginal land and the Australian Government's health promotion Beat the grog and Condoman AIDS awareness campaign, developed in collaboration with Aboriginal and Torres Strait Islander health workers.

In 1976, Marie began working at The Tin Sheds Workshop at the University of Sydney, where a number of feminists were putting out posters related to feminist issues. In 2015, the Sydney University Gallery held an exhibition titled Girls in the Tin Shed; Marie had several works in the exhibition. In the 1970s, posters proliferated as inexpensive ways to express ideas through art. When asked about that period McMahon said the women artists "saw themselves as outsiders to the mainstream art establishment, inspired by acts like the Sex Pistols and the Clash."

Marie also produced prints at the Australian Print Workshop in Fitzroy, Victoria and so was included in a major exhibition Place Made: Australian Print Workshop held in early 2004 at the National Gallery of Australia (NGA). When the NGA acquired many prints from the Workshop, they acquired more than 90 of McMahon's prints.

From 1988 to 1996, McMahon worked in the Tiwi Islands while living at Batchelor, south of Darwin. From 2000 to 2001 at she lived Gunbalanya, Arnhem Land, where she produced a series of collages interpreting the landscapes around her. From 2009 to 2010, her works have dealt with political conflict in Indochina and Cambodia.

== Women's Domestic Needlework Group ==
In 1976 McMahon and artist Frances (Budden) Phoenix initiated The Women's Domestic Needlework Group (WDNG) Their aim was to reclaim the creative, but historically undervalued, practices of embroidery, knitting, crochet, lace making and needlework.

The most significant of their four exhibitions was the D'Oyley exhibition at Watters Gallery in Sydney in 1979. The exhibition, focusing on women's 'fancywork' featured more than 700 handmade doilies that were collected from various thrift shops. The exhibition was sponsored the Crafts Board of the Australia Council.

== Collections ==
McMahon's prints and posters are held in the National Gallery of Victoria, the Bendigo Regional Gallery, the National Gallery of Australia, the Art Gallery of New South Wales, the Australian Queer Archives, and the Museum of Contemporary Art in Sydney. as well as in various regional galleries in Australia and in private collections.
