= Margaret Dodd =

Australian artist and filmmaker

Margaret Dodd (born 1 February 1941) is an Australian artist who works in ceramics and film/video. Her most well-known work is a series titled I am not a Car that included ceramic models of Australian cars as well as an animated film, first shown at the Art Gallery of South Australia in 1977, and again in 2020.

== Early life, education and marriage ==
Dodd was born on 1 February 1941 in Berri, South Australia. At the age of 15 she received as an art prize a book about design and decorating for the home. She was devastated because she thought there should be more to a woman's life than the assigned role in the home.

Dodd attended Adelaide Teachers College and later the South Australian School of Art.

By 1964 she was married with children, living in the United States where her husband worked at Yale University in New Haven, Connecticut. At this time she read The Feminine Mystique by Betty Friedan, and felt liberated by new concepts of women's roles.

When her husband transferred to a new job at the University of California, Davis, Dodd enrolled in a Bachelor of Arts program at the university. She studied art with Robert Arneson and became part of what became known as the "funk ceramics" movement. She graduated from the University of California in 1968.

== Career ==
In 1968, Dodd returned to Australia when her husband achieved a tenured position at the University of Adelaide and lived in the Adelaide suburb of Holden Hill. Here she began to create her ceramic Holden FX cars to consider Australian identity and male and female roles. Many cars were dressed in costumes or presented as trying to be an Australian animal. She then used the models to create her first film. The Holden FX was Australian-made but American-owned and Dodd defined it as the "Trojan horse of American imperialism".

In the 1970s Dodd became part of a loose movement of ceramicists in Adelaide who were embracing what might be called 'funk' art. She was also involved with the Women's Art Movement in Adelaide.

In 1977 Dodd created the series titled I am not a Car that consisted of ceramic Holden sculptures dressed as babies, mothers and brides, created in studios at the JamFactory on Payneham Road.

By 1982 Dodd was already known for her Holden car ceramics. She then made the film I am not a Car to explore how men objectified women and viewed both women and cars as objects of desire. It has been described as a suburban horror story. A mother takes her children to a beach, and upon return is accosted by men at a petrol station. The film is full of strange imagery (the glance of a breast as a headlight). The film undermined the image of domestic life at that time. It was first screened in 1983. It was shown again in 2017 at the Ace Gallery, Lions' Art Centre, Adelaide. This exhibition included objects from her series Chosen Vessel (2008) and Holden Hypotheses (2014).

In 2008, Dodd presented Chosen Vessel -- Australia's own car in a new exhibition. The show still focused on Holden cars from 1940 - 1960. At the time of the exhibition, the artists was quoted as saying:

"They [Holden family cars] are disappearing gradually and they become fossils," she says. "They gradually become more and more irrelevant to the next generation. There's no doubt that there is an element of nostalgia in the collection." "People identify incredibly strongly with their car," she says. "You can live in it, you can wear it, you can drive it, it is your badge of who you are. But as these old cars disappear into the mists of history, they become classical objects, or fossils. Cars now all look pretty much the same. You have to actually look at the badge sometimes to work out what the car is."

On 20 October 2017 the Holden factory closed.

Dodd has created other sculptures, but has continually returned to cars.

== Collections ==
- Art Gallery of New South Wales
- Art Gallery of South Australia
- Art Gallery of Western Australia
- National Gallery of Australia
- National Gallery of Victoria
- Powerhouse Museum
- Queensland Art Gallery and Gallery of Modern Art
