= Flinders University Museum of Art =

Coordinates: 35°01′09″S 138°34′13″E

- Established: 1978
- Location: Flinders University, Sturt Rd, Social Sciences North, Bedford Park SA 5042
- Type: University art museums and galleries
- Director: Fiona Salmon
- Website: www.flinders.edu.au/museum-of-art/

Flinders University Museum of Art (FUMA), sometimes referred to as Flinders Art Museum, is an art museum in Adelaide, South Australia, that preserves and develops Flinders University's historical and contemporary art collections.

== History ==
The art museum was formally established in 1978 by resolution of the Flinders University Council to house the university's growing collection of art. Since the first year of undergraduate teaching at the university in 1966, art had been actively acquired to complement courses in fine arts.

The collection was established in 1997 in Grote Street in Adelaide city centre. It relocated to the State Library of South Australia on North Terrace in 2003 until its closure in June 2018. In that year, FUMA's Online Collections Catalogue was launched.

From 2019 a dedicated gallery, co-located with the Art Museum at the university's Bedford Park campus, "presents diverse and inclusive curatorial projects that provoke enquiry and support innovative collaborations between regional and global partners".

The Post-object and Documentation collection, "one of the most comprehensive national collections that documents conceptual art making in the 1960s and 1970s", was initiated by Donald Brook, Chair of Visual Arts at Flinders from 1974. He also gifted a collection of work by the experimental Sydney art collective of the 1970s, Optronic Kinetics, which amalgamated science and technology with art to produce radical new works of conceptual art, sometimes humorous.

== Collections ==
The Flinders University Museum of Art collection has grown to more than 8,000 works, making it one of the largest university art collections in Australia.

The collection covers four main areas:

- Aboriginal and Torres Strait Islander art
- European prints
- Post-object and Documentation
- Australian political posters

The university collections may be viewed by appointment.

== Exhibitions ==
- 16 May 2024 – 5 July 2024: If you don't fight... you lose: politics, posters and PAM, co-curated by art historian Catherine Speck and Jude Adams; celebrating the art of the Progressive Art Movement, particularly the feminists working within it
