= Frances Phoenix =

Australian artist (1950–2017)

- Born: Frances Budden; 1950; Sydney, Australia
- Died: 2017 (aged 66–67); Adelaide, Australia
- Movement: Women's Art Movement

Frances Phoenix (born Budden) (1950–2017) was an Australian feminist artist known for needlework and poster designs. Phoenix contributed to the Women's Art Movement groups in both Sydney and Adelaide, as well as multiple community art projects. She was active in feminist and lesbian cultural movements.

With Marie McMahon, she was a founding member of the Women's Domestic Needlework Group and contributed to Judy Chicago's The Dinner Party (1974–1979). She continued to study and practice art for the rest of her life. Her needlework and poster designs are held in national collections.

== Early life ==
Phoenix was born in 1950. She originally studied to become a teacher at the National Art School and Alexander Mackie Teacher’s College, Sydney.

== Career ==
From 1973-1982, Phoenix was employed as an art teacher in various high schools in New South Wales. During that time she attended demonstrations and marches and used photography, needlework and posters to advocate for social and political change. She published photographs of the first Sydney Gay and Lesbian Mardi Gras in 1978 and the police presence. She continued her activism and community art work after moving to South Australia.

Phoenix was actively involved in the Women’s Art Movement (Sydney, 1975, Adelaide, 1984), the Wimmin’s Warehouse in 1979, Amazon Acres (a women-only separatist community in New South Wales) in 1978, and the Pine Gap Peace Camp near Alice Springs in 1983. She photographed and participated in demonstrations in the 1970s: "Women Against Rape in War", "Anti-Uranium Mining" "International Women’s Day", "Medibank Demonstration" and the first Sydney Gay and Lesbian Mardi Gras in 1978.

In 1974, she joined Australia's first Women's Art Movement, based in Sydney. Around this time, Phoenix began experimentations with domestic needlework, generating central core imagery, Australiana and activist slogans in stitch. With Marie McMahon, Phoenix began a doily archive, researching the history of women's needlework and running women's needlework classes at the Tin Sheds art collective in the grounds of Sydney University.

With Joan Grounds, Bernadette Krone, Kathy Letray, Patricia McDonald, Noela Taylor, and Loretta Vieceli, McMahon and Phoenix formed the Women's Domestic Needlework collection, preparing the archive for a touring exhibition, beginning at Watters Gallery, Sydney. The group supplemented the exhibition with research in Lip, two publications: The D'oyley Show: An Exhibition of Women’s Domestic Fancywork and Work for Dainty Fingers and a series of 10 screenprinted posters. With Marie McMahon, Phoenix travelled to the United States of America to contribute needlework skills to Judy Chicago's The Dinner Party (1974–79). Phoenix' account of the experience is detailed in her publication Our story/Herstory? Working on Judy Chicago's Dinner Party. While in Sydney, Phoenix was also a founding member of Matilda Graphics and the local feminist arts publication F/Arts.

In the early 1980s, Phoenix joined the Adelaide Women's Art Movement. She spearheaded multiple community art projects including Double our Numbers and The Alchemists' Teaparty. She continued to study throughout her life, completing a masters degree in visual art on The critical corpse : re-(inter)preting the abject dead animal in visual art at the University of South Australia.

== Works ==
- Queen of Spades (previously known as Kunda), 1975, doily mounted on board
- No Goddesses | No Mistresses, no goddesses no mistresses (anarcho-feminism), 1978, insert for a ‘Dinner Party’ runner: red embroidery cotton on white commercial doily, 29.7 x 21 cm
- Grow your own grassroots defiance against the capitalist plot: Victory, 1981, four-colour screen printed poster

== Exhibitions ==
- Unfinished Business, Australian Centre for Contemporary Art, 2018
- The D'Oyley Show, Watters Gallery and touring in Port Kembla, Nowra, Broken Hill, Orange, Bathurst, Maitland, Armidale, Lismore, 1979
