= Caroline Phillips (visual artist) =

Australian visual artist

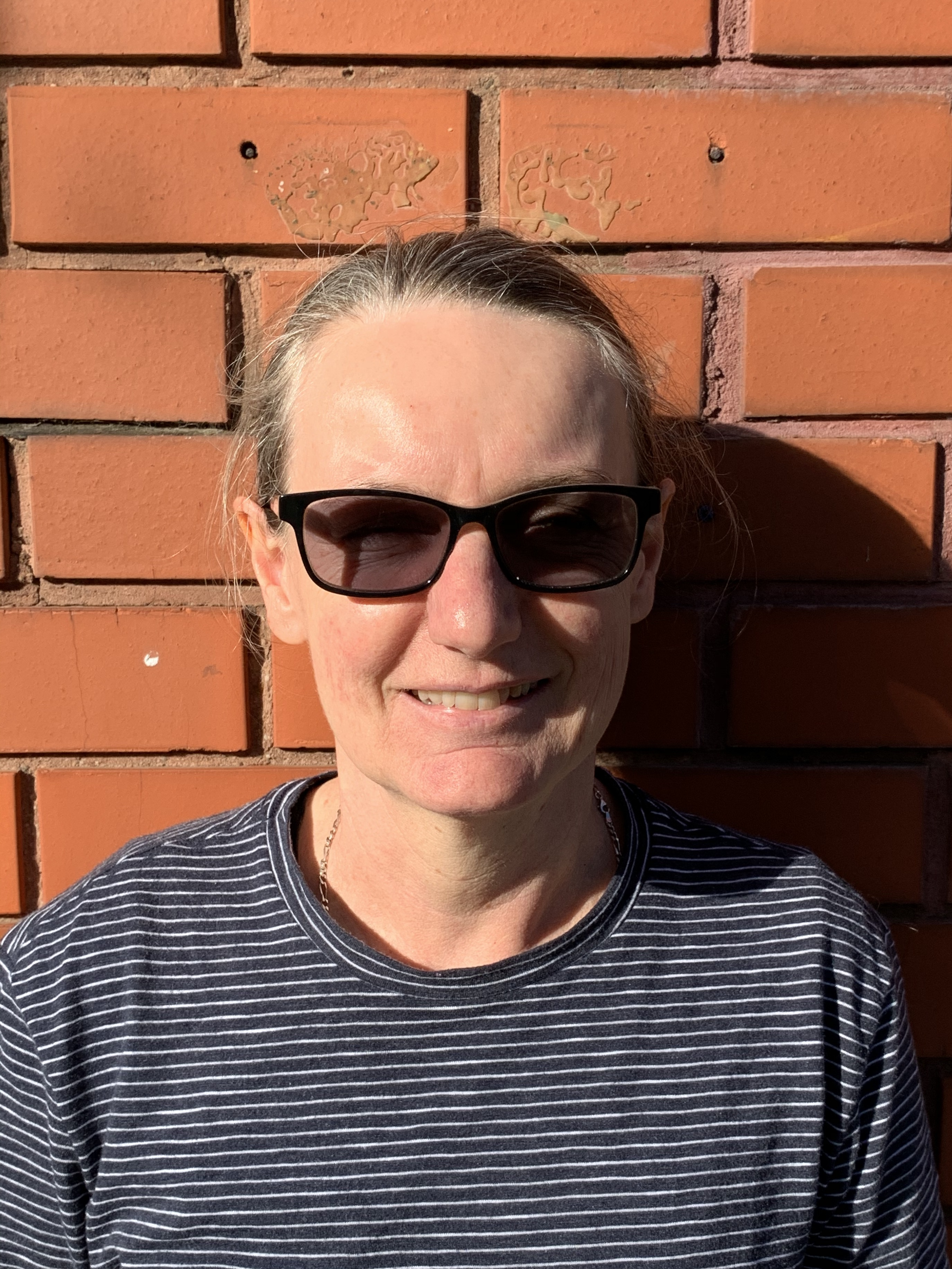
- Caroline Phillips, visual artist
- Born: 1966 (age 59–60)
- Education: Phillip Institute of Technology, Victorian College of the Arts

Caroline Phillips (born 1966) is an Australian visual artist who has exhibited works in Australia and internationally in the areas of sculpture, and photography. Phillips' works deploy industrial and textile based materials to critique contemporary feminist aesthetics, through modes of abstraction and materiality.

Phillips also works as an independent curator and researcher on collaborative projects that highlight the strength of women's art practice and challenge systemic inequities in political and cultural systems. Phillips was Secretary of the Women's Art Register, Melbourne, Australia from 2017–2023 and Convenor in 2023–24. In 2021 she was awarded the City of Yarra award for Contributions to Arts.

== Biography and selected exhibitions ==
In 1983, Phillips completed her bachelor's degree in Fine Art (Painting) at the Phillip Institute of Technology in Melbourne. At the Victorian College of the Arts, she completed her Postgraduate Diploma in Visual Art in 2009, a Masters of Fine Arts in 2012 at the Victorian College of the Arts, and finally her PhD in Fine Art in 2017.

In her work as an independent curator, researcher and facilitator she has curated:

- The f Word-Contemporary Feminist Art in Australia, Gippsland Art Gallery, Sale and Ararat Regional Art Gallery, Victoria. (2014).
- f-generation: feminism, art, progressions (co-curated with Juliette Peers and Veronica Caven Aldous), George Paton Gallery, Melbourne, (2015).
- AS IF: Echoes of the Women’s Art Register (a collaborative project with Juliette Peers, Stephanie Leigh and the Women's Art Register), West Space, Melbourne (2015).

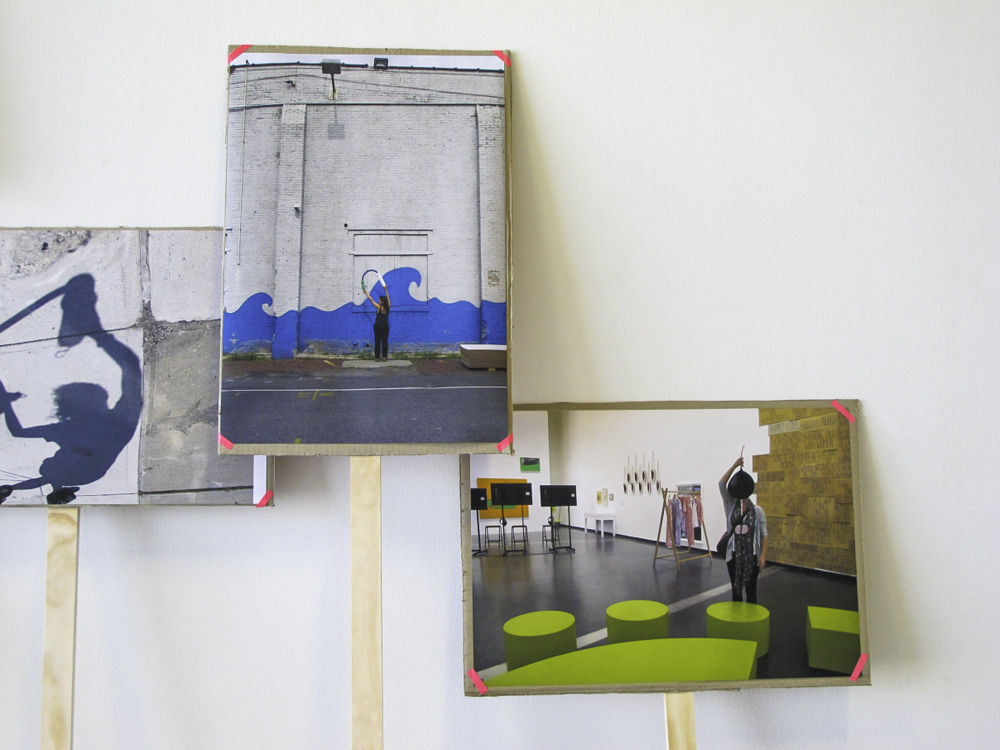
"There's something happening here – artwork from 2018 – part 1 of series

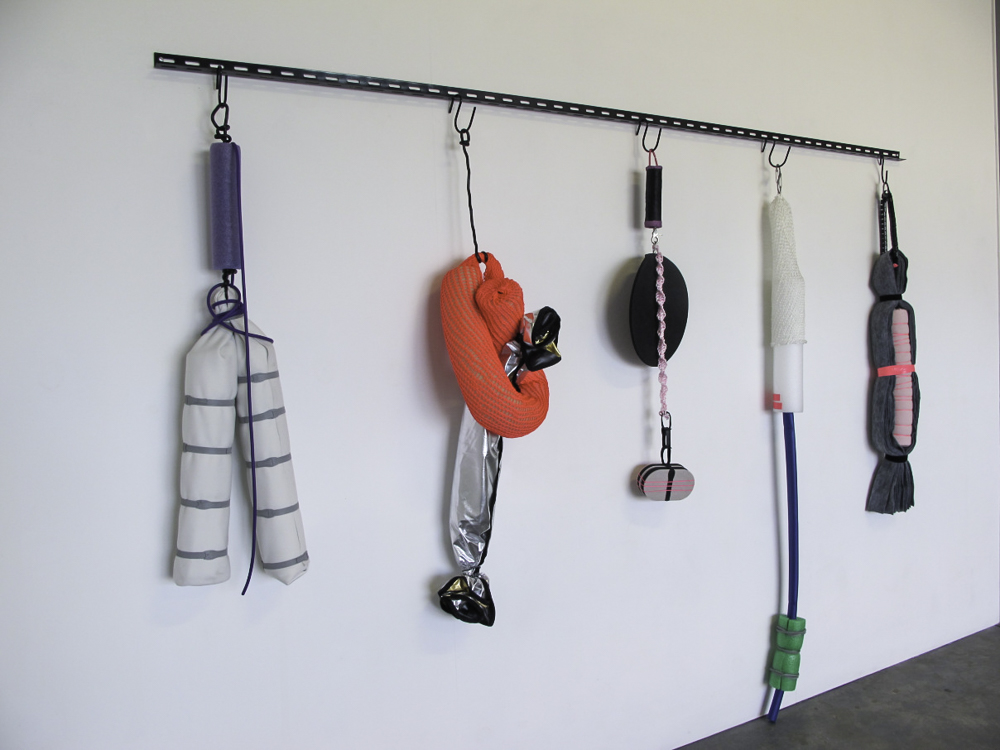
"there's something happening here – artwork from 2018 – part 2 of series

== Selected solo exhibitions ==
- Holding Pattern, George Paton Gallery, Melbourne, VIC (2010)
- "Enmeshed", Craft, Melbourne, VIC (2013)
- "Hang Ups", Factory 49, Sydney, NSW (2014)
- Materialising Feminism, Margaret Lawrence Gallery, Melbourne, VIC (2016)
- "there's something happening here...", NARS Presents @ Anese Projects, New York, USA (2017)
- "there's something happening here...(extended remix)", Boxcopy, Brisbane, Queensland (2018)

== Publications ==
- Materialising the interval: Relationality as a feminist art practice, in “Feminist Perspectives on Art: Contemporary Outtakes”, edited by Jacqueline Millner and Catriona Moore, 2018, Routledge, Oxon (UK) and New York – 2018
- Materialising Feminism: Object and Interval, PhD thesis, University of Melbourne, Victorian College of the Arts, School of Art – 2017
- Art and Social Equity, a feminist approach, Researching for Change, Melbourne Social Equity Institute – 2015
- Review: Louise Bourgeois, Late Works, Artlink Vol 33, No.2 – 2013
- A phenomenology of Sexual Difference in Sculpture, Writing from Below Vol. 1, No. 2 – 2013
- Review: A Different Temporality: Aspects of Australian Feminist Art Practice 1975–1985, Artlink Vol. 31, No. 4 – 2011
