= Julieanna Preston =

New Zealand academic and spatial artist

Julieanna Preston is a Professor of Spatial Practice at Massey University's College of Creative Arts in Wellington, New Zealand. Her practice draws from the disciplines of architecture, art and philosophy, and her background in interior design, building construction, landscape gardening and performance writing.

== Practice ==
Preston's work explores concepts of "vitality, agency, and hospitality". Her work includes site-specific durational performances and written publication in areas such as feminist philosophy, new materialism and spatial politics.

== Career ==
Preston gained a BArch from Virginia Tech in 1983 and an MArch from Cranbrook Academy of Art in Michigan in 1990. She has a PhD (by practice) from RMIT, where her thesis, entitled Inertia: of interior, surface, matter and completed in 2013, explored the interior surface.

From 2015 to 2018 she was Research Coordinator for the School of Design at Massey University.

She was a board member of The Architectural Centre Inc. in Wellington in 1998.

== Performances ==
- RPM Hums (The Performance Arcade, Wellington, 2018)
- Murmur (Newcastle‐Upon‐Tyne, UK, 2017)
- IN COLD HEAT (Flachau, Austria, 2016)
- Attending (with Mick Douglas, Syracuse NY, 2016)
- Waning (Birling Gap, UK, 2016)
- bit‐u‐men‐at‐work (with Jen Archer‐Martin, Melbourne, Australia, 2015)
- Stirring Stillness: Aesthetic variations on a concrete plane (Konstfack College of Art, Sweden, 2015)
- Auē (Puke Ariki, New Plymouth, NZ, 2015)
- Reconciliation of Carboniferous Accretions (NIEMME, Newcastle upon Tyne, UK, 2014)
- Becoming Boulder (SCANZ, New Plymouth, NZ, 2015)
- Sounding Out Vacancy (Wellington, NZ, 2014)
- Meeting, you in detail (Writingplace, Delft, 2013)
- Moving Stuff (Auckland Art Festival, 2013)
- BALE (Snowhite Gallery, NZ, 2011)
- No Fixed Seating (Whirlwinds, London, 2010)

== Publications ==
- Elocutions, Elaborations, and Expositions of Interior Design Creative Scholarship (Journal of Interior Design, Volume 43, Issue 1 (Special issue), March 2018, pages 5–8)
- Performing Matter: Interior Surface and Feminist Actions (AADR 2014) ISBN 978-3-88778-412-6
- 'Dear Rosa' (IDEA Journal Design Activism, 2014)
- 'Surface Demonstrations' (in Handbook of Interior Architecture and Design, Lois Weinthal & Graeme Brooker (eds), 2013) ISBN 9781847887450 OCLC 832610461
- 'An Antipodean Imaginary for Architecture+Philosophy: Ficto-Critical Approaches to Design Practice Research', (with Megg Evans, Ceri Hann, Zuzana Kovar, Sean Pickersgill, Michael Spooner and Hélène Frichot, in FOOTPRINT, [S.l.], pages 69–96, January 2012. doi:10.7480/footprint.6.1-2.751 ISSN 1875-1490
- 'Blazing Inter-Alia: Tropes of a Feminist Interior Practice' (in Feminist Practices: Interdisciplinary Approaches to Women in Architecture, Lori Brown (ed), 2011) ISBN 9781409421184 OCLC 764633547
- 'Fossicking for Interior Design Pedagogies' (After Taste: Expanded Practices in Interior Design, Kent Kleinman, Joanna Merwood-Salisbury & Lois Weinthal (eds), 2011) ISBN 9781616891398 OCLC 829025923

=== As editor ===
- Interior Atmospheres (Architectural Design, Volume 78, no. 3, May/June 2008) ISBN 978-0-470-51254-8 OCLC 209802206
- Intimus: Interior Design Theory Reader (Wiley, 2006), co-edited with Mark Taylor. ISBN 978-0-470-01570-4 OCLC 63397636
- Interior Economies (IDEA, 2011)
- Moments of Resistance (co-edited with Mark Taylor and Andrew Charleson, Sydney: Archadia Press, 2002)
