= Women's Studies Resource Centre =

Feminist library in Adelaide, South Australia

Women's Studies Resource Centre is a feminist library in Adelaide, South Australia specialising in resources about women for the education sector: primary and secondary school students and teachers, tertiary students and staff at Technical and Further Education (TAFE) and University, and the general community. In 2010, the Women's Studies Resource Centre noted in its blog that closure was imminent and closed permanently in February 2015.

== History ==
The centre began as a result of the first national conference on Sexism in Education in 1973 convened by the Women's Liberation Movement and subsequent Women's Studies courses that were established at Flinders and Adelaide Universities.

The Education Department held a conference entitled Women in Education, reflecting its concern with the position of women and girls in our society.

Teachers and students involved in the new Women's Studies courses quickly became aware of the shortage of resources for their needs. A group of women from various fields of education began meeting in 1974 with the aim of developing a Women's Studies curriculum for secondary schools and bringing together the resources necessary for such a course. With a grant from the Australian National Advisory Committee for International Women's Year, the Women's Studies Resource Centre was established in July 1975, celebrating its 30th year in 2005.

The centre and its collection was variously located at Wattle Park Teachers centre, Adelaide Girls High School in Grote Street, above the Women's Information Switchboard in Kintore Avenue, the Liverpool Building in Flinders Street and later at 64 Pennington Terrace, North Adelaide.

== Collection ==
It houses a comprehensive feminist collection of 17,000 items, including the Women's Liberation archives and provides collating room for 'Liberation' the Adelaide Women's Liberation newsletter, who the Oxford Australian Feminism: a companion, has termed "one of the liveliest women's liberation groups in the country".

The collection includes records from a number of Australian women's groups, including the Women's Electoral Lobby, a national lobbying group established in 1972, and issue specific groups such as Women Against Nuclear Energy, Women's Abortion Action Campaign, and Women's Action Against Global Violence.

== See also ==
- Australian Feminist Art Timeline
