= Sandy Kirby =

Australian feminist art historian

Sandy Kirby (1948 – 2011) was an Australian art historian, curator and academic responsible for the first major survey of Australian feminist art.

== Research and writing ==
Kirby is known for her writing on Australian feminist art and Australian women artists. Her book Sight Lines (1992) was the first major survey of Australian feminist art. In it, Kirby argues that the Women's Movement had a profound effect on Australian women's art and our understanding of history. Sight Lines outlines key historical figures and activities within the Australian feminist art movement of the 1970s and 1980s, as well as historical accounts of the work of women artists in the 1950s and 1960s.

Kirby's research, writing and curatorial work on the Australian social and political movements gave rise to community engaged art in Australia, in particular the art and culture of the Labour movement.

== Exhibitions ==
In 2006, Kirby collaborated on a series of exhibitions and events in Melbourne, Australia to commemorate the 150th anniversary of the Australian Eight Hour Day movement. The program of more than 15 events was developed by the Victorian Trades Hall Council's Eight Hour Day 150th Anniversary Committee, in collaboration with Museums Victoria. Kirby curated the exhibition It's About Time! The Eight Hour Day 1856-2006, shown at ACMI (Australian Centre for the Moving Image) before travelling to other sites.

== Publications ==
- Kirby, S. Sight Lines, Women's Art and Feminist Perspectives in Australia, Craftsman House (1992). ISBN 978-976-8097-26-2
- Kirby, S. (Ed), Ian Burn (author), Art: critical, political, University of Western Sydney, Nepean (1996). ISBN 1863412956
- Kirby, S. 'An Historical Perspective on the Community Arts Movement’, in Vivienne Binns, ed., Community and the Arts: history, theory, practice, Southwood Press (1991): 19–30. ISBN 978-094-9138-56-9
- Kirby, S. 'Artists and unions: a critical tradition: a report on the Art & Working Life Program', Australia Council, 1992. ISBN 1862570957
