= Kate Daw =

Australian artist

- Born: 1965; Esperance, Western Australia, Australia
- Died: 7 September 2020 (aged 55); Melbourne, Victoria, Australia
- Spouse: Robert Hassan

Kate Daw (1965 - September 2020) was an Australian visual artist and former Head of Art at the Victorian College of the Arts in Melbourne.

== Career ==
Kate Daw was born in 1965 in Esperance, Western Australia, and her family moved to Sorrento when she was five. She initially studied art at the Western Australian Institute of Technology but dropped out when she was 18. After moving to Melbourne, Daw graduated in Painting at the Victorian College of the Arts (VCA) in 1989, and began exhibiting work extensively from 1992.

Her work incorporated canvas, ceramic, fabric and paper, though she later moved away from painting. She began a Master of Fine Arts degree at Glasgow School of Art in 1995, completing it back in Australia at RMIT University, and also had several international artist residencies through the 1990s and 2010s.

She collaborated with Scottish artist Stewart Russell on a series of works beginning in 2007, including a residency at the Melbourne Cricket Ground, where they developed Two Homes, Another World (2016), a project with Indigenous Australian football player Liam Jurrah, and the installation Civil Twilight End (2011) at Melbourne Docklands.

In the 2000s, Daw taught Painting at VCA, where she also begun her Doctorate, with the thesis titled The Between Space: narrative in contemporary visual practice. After five years as Head of Painting, she was made Head of Art at the VCA in 2018.

After undergoing treatment for cancer, Kate Daw died 7 September 2020, aged 55.

== Selected exhibitions and works ==
- Work: four recent projects (1997), William Mora Galleries
- The Between Space (2006), Art Gallery of Western Australia
- Civil Twilight End with Stewart Russell (2011)
- Green Lamp (2014), Biennale of Sydney
- Lights No Eyes Can See (2015), Australian Centre for Contemporary Art
- Love, Work (prelude, aftermath, everyday) (2020), All That Was Solid Melts group exhibition, Auckland Art Gallery
- Reverse Anthem with Stewart Russell (2021), Rising (previously part of 2016's Two Homes, Another World)

== Collections ==
Kate Daw's work is held in several galleries and museums in Australia.

- Art Gallery of Western Australia
- Australian Sports Museum
- City of Melbourne
- National Gallery of Victoria
