= Susan Best =

Australian art historian

Susan Best FAHA is an art historian with expertise in critical theory and modern and contemporary art. Best is a professor at the Queensland College of Art, Griffith University.

Her book, Visualizing Feeling: Affect and the Feminine Avant-garde focuses on four artists of the 1960s and 70s: Eva Hesse, Lygia Clark, Ana Mendieta and Theresa Hak Kyung Cha. It shows how their work transforms the avant-garde protocols of the period by introducing an affective dimension to late modern art. According to Suzannah Biernoff Visualizing Feeling: Affect and the Feminine Avant-garde "should be compulsory reading for anyone interested in psychoanalytic approaches to art." The project was funded by an Australian Research Council Discovery grant.

== Awards ==
In 2017, Reparative Aesthetics: Witnessing in Contemporary Art Photography was the joint winner of the best book prize awarded by the Art Association of Australia and New Zealand, an organization with over three hundred members.

In 2017, she was elected Fellow of the Australian Academy of the Humanities.

In 2012, her book Visualizing Feeling: Affect and the Feminine Avant-garde won the best book prize awarded by the Art Association of Australia and New Zealand.

== Selected books ==
- Best, Susan 2021, It's not personal: Post 1960s Body Art and Performance, Bloomsbury Philosophy, London
- Best, Susan, 2016, Reparative Aesthetics: Witnessing in Contemporary Art Photography, Bloosmbury Academic, London.
- Best, Susan, 2011, Visualizing Feeling: Affect and the Feminine Avant-garde, I B Tauris, London.
- Best, Susan (2011). Robyn Backen, Backspace: The Art of Communication: Works from 1990-2010. Sydney: Boccalatte Publishing. ISBN 9780980631227.

== Selected book chapters ==
- Best, Susan 2021, "Repair and the Irreparable in Australian Aboriginal Art" Truth in Visual Media, ed. Marguerite La Caze and Ted Nannicelli, Edinburgh University Press pp. 15–35
- Best, Susan 2021, “William Yang: Shame and Shamelessness,” William Yang: Seeing and being seen, Queensland Art Gallery and Gallery of Modern Art, Brisbane, 44-55.
- Best, Susan 2019 "From representation to affect: beyond postmodern identity politics in feminist art,” A Companion to Feminist Art, ed. Maria Buszek and Hilary Robinson, Wiley Blackwell, pp. 405–417.
- Best, Susan 2016 “Fiona Pardington’s Photography: Life, Love and Libido,” Fiona Pardington: A Beautiful Hesitation, ed. Kriselle Baker and Aaron Lister, Wellington: Victoria UP), pp. 28–33.
- Best, Susan, 2014, 'Anne Ferran: Histories of Women and Other Blind Spots', in Anne Ferran: Shadow Land, Power Publications, Sydney.
- Best, Susan 2014, 'Mineral Nature: Mikala Dwyer Rocks', in Mikala Dwyer: The Garden of Half-Life, University of Sydney, University Art Gallery, Sydney, pp. 12 – 19.
- Best, Susan, 2013, 'Lygia Clark, the Paris Years: The Body as Medium and Material', in Posman S; Reverseau A; Ayers D; Bru S; Hjartarson B (ed.), The Aesthetics of Matter. Modernism, the Avant-Garde, and Material Exchange, edn. 1st ed., Walter de Grutyer, Berlin, pp. 292 – 301.
- Best, Susan, 2011, 'Rivane Neuenschwander and the Legacy of Tropicalia', in McNamara A (ed.), Sweat: The Subtropical Imaginary, edn. 1, IMA, Brisbane and Urban Modernities Research Group, QUT, Brisbane, pp. 28 – 43
- Best, Susan, 2009, 'Relational Art, Identification and the Social Bond', in Gonçalves LR (ed.), The Institutionalization of Contemporary Art: Art criticism, museums, biennials and the art market., Museu de Arte Contemporânea, University of São Paulo, São Paulo, pp. 217 – 225.
- Best, Susan, 2004, 'Joan Brassil', in The Grove Library of World Art, Oxford University Press, Oxford.
- Best, Susan, 2004, 'Joan Grounds & Sherre DeLys Tickled Pink Laughter as Intitutional Critique', in Carlos I (ed.), Biennale of Sydney 2004 On Reason and Emotion, Biennale of Sydney, Sydney, pp. 98 – 99.
- Best, Susan, 2001, 'You are on Aboriginal Land: Landscape after Land Rights', in Green C (ed.), Postcolonialism + Art Where Now?, Artspace Visual Art Centre, Sydney.
- Best, Susan, 2001, 'Elemental Constructions:Women Artists and Sculpture in the Expanded Field', in Getczy A; Genocchio B (ed.), What Is Installation?, Power Publications, Sydney, pp. 185 – 205.
