= The Performance Arcade =

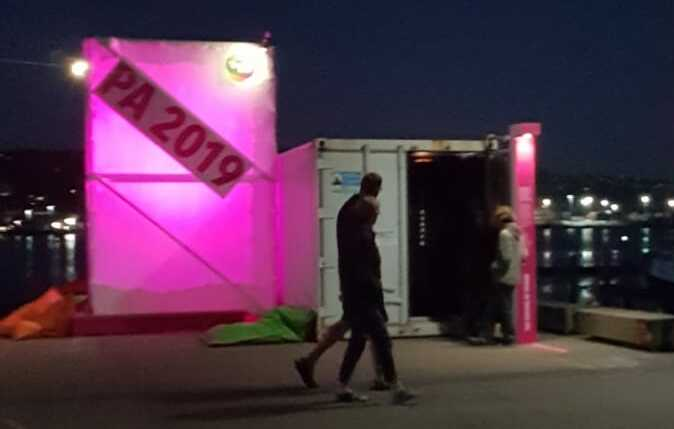
- The Performance Arcade 2019
- Genre: live-art and music
- Frequency: annual
- Venue: Wellington waterfront
- Country: New Zealand
- Founded: 2011
- Founders: Sam Trubridge
- Website: https://www.theperformancearcade.com/about

The Performance Arcade is an annual festival held on Wellington's waterfront of live-art and music events held in a temporary installation of shipping containers. It is free entry and designed to attract passers-by and be family friendly.

== History ==
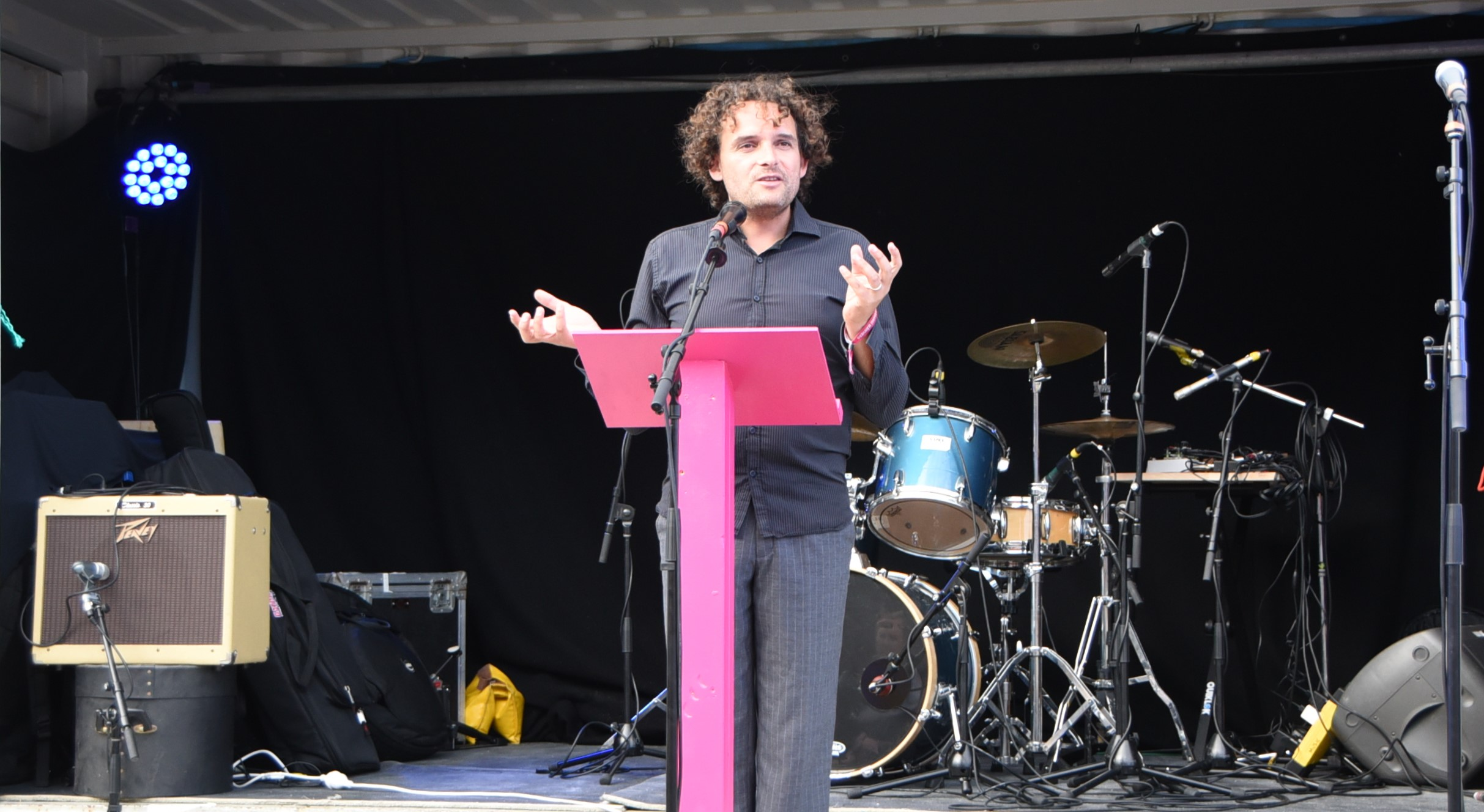
Artistic director and curator Sam Trubridge

The Performance Arcade was first held in 2011 and was founded and is led by the Director, Sam Trubridge. It often attracts up to 60,000 people. In 2021 Sam Trubridge received the Arts Wellingtonian of the Year award as founder of The Performance Arcade.

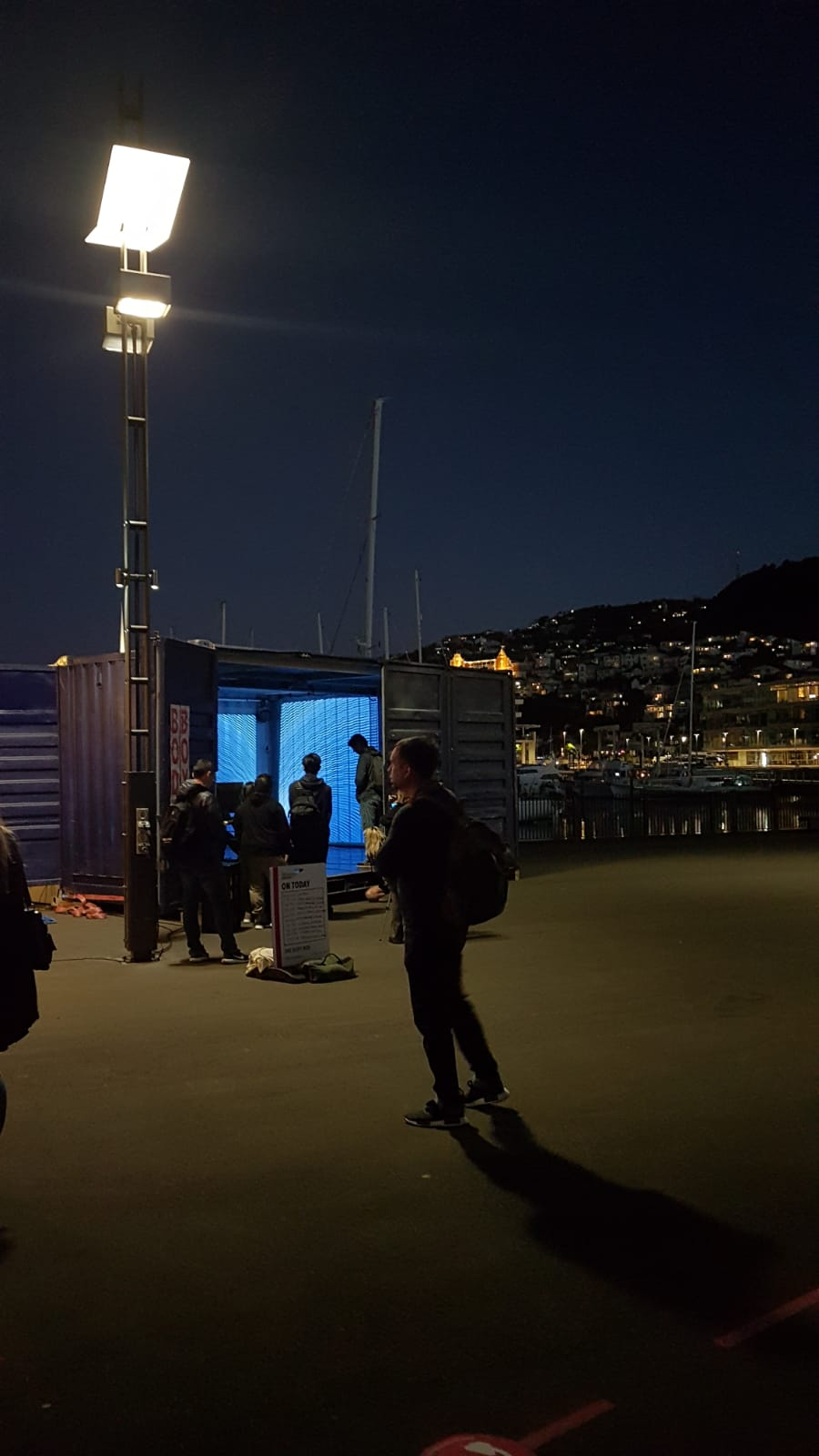
Performance Arcade at night 2019

== Programme ==
The programme is a range of performance art, theatre artists and music. The Performance Arcade was part of the 2014 New Zealand Festival and featured 14 container works from both New Zealand and international artists (Australia, Canada and USA). New Zealand companies included Java Dance, Binge Culture, Barbarian Productions and Touch Compass. Three video works from the 2108 and 2019 programmes were presented by The Wallace Art Trust at the Pah Homestead in 2019 showing 'performance art, dance and drawing practices'.

In 2022 there were 15 performance art 'experiences' including Kia Tūhono, a sonic installation made from sound from an ancient log from the Wairarapa created by Warren Maxwell (of band TrinityRoots), and a music series with 40 performances. The Floating Theatre by director and designer Stephen Bain was part of the programme in 2023. The Performance Arcade in 2023 was in the New Zealand Fringe Festival programme.
