= Lorraine Connelly-Northey =

Australian Aboriginal artist

Lorraine Connelly-Northey (born 1962 in Swan Hill, Victoria) is an Australian Aboriginal artist, a descendant of the Waradgerie (Wiradjuri) people. She also has Irish, English and Scottish heritage.

== Work ==
Lorraine Connelly-Northey's artistic practice is influenced by both her western and Indigenous heritage. She is known for her over-sized woven installations that take the shape of traditional Aboriginal everyday life objects, such as koolimans (bowls) and narbongs (dilly bags). For creating her pieces she uses found natural and industrial materials, such as feathers, shells, corrugated iron, and wire.

Connelly-Northey has exhibited in the 2nd International Indigenous Triennial (2013), the 7th Asia Pacific Triennial of Contemporary Art (2013), and in the 18th Biennale of Sydney (2010).

Her work is held by important collections, including the Art Gallery of New South Wales, Sydney; Museum of Contemporary Art Australia, Sydney; National Gallery of Victoria, Melbourne; Queensland Art Gallery | Gallery of Modern Art, Brisbane, among others.

In 2023, to commemorate 100 years of legacy, the Australian War Memorial acquired a sculpture by Connelly-Northey, which consists of 100 steel-made coolamons.
