= Jill Orr =

Australian artist (born 1952)

- Born: 1952 (age 73–74); Melbourne, Australia
- Education: RMIT University; Monash University
- Known for: Performance; Photography; Video; Installation

Jill Orr (born 1952) is a contemporary artist based in Melbourne, Australia, whose works have been exhibited around the world.

== Early life and education ==
Jill Orr was born in 1952.

She completed a Higher Diploma of Secondary Art and Craft Teaching, at Melbourne College of Advanced Education in 1975. In 1994 Orr received a Masters of Arts in Fine Art at Royal Melbourne University of Technology, and in 2006, Orr commenced a PhD in Art and Design, at Monash University.

== Art practice ==
Orr is best known for her works in performance, photography, video and installation works that often explore the body, and its positioning within social, political and environmental contexts. While Orr's works are predominantly site-specific, the recording of her works are regarded as equally significant aspects of her working practice.

== Career ==
Orr was supported as an artist-in-residence in Adelaide by the Women's Art Movement there in the 1970s or 1980s.

== Collections and exhibitions ==
Since the late 1970s Orr's works have been presented in Paris, Beijing, Hong Kong, Amsterdam, Antwerp, New York, Toronto, Quebec City, Graz, Sydney, Melbourne, Adelaide and Brisbane.

Orr's works are included in a number of major public collections including the National Gallery of Australia, Redgate Gallery Beijing, the National Gallery of Victoria, The Graeme Gibson collection, the Monash Gallery of Art and Griffith Artworks. Many of her works are also held in private collections in Australia, the Netherlands, England, France, the United States, China and Belgium.

== Major works ==
- Sleep of Reason Produces Monsters – Goya Performed at both Artspace, Sydney (2002), and fortyfivedownstairs, Melbourne (2003). The title was taken from an etching by Goya, the master of depicting the extremes of humanity. The work refers to the post-11 September world, the beginning of the war in Iraq, and the continuing plight of refugees imprisoned in Australian detention centres. The performance highlighted the ongoing death, maiming and destruction of civil liberties that holds sway through clashing belief systems, in the name of the 'War on Terror'. The performance was constructed with two adjoining darkened rooms; one to exhibit shadowy images on a single screen projection, and the other containing 4 light sensitive paintings. The lighting in one of the rooms cycled between dull spot lighting to total darkness for 60 seconds, which then the only light source is from the illuminosity of the four paintings. Orr became a part of the installation; a contained creature twitching and jerking in the dark. Orr's character explored the confines of the rooms, while assembling bones into sculptural pieces, some which became body adornments. The performance was a twelve-hour endurance event in which sculptures were created from a tonne of animal meat and bones. Orr chose animal remains as an allegory to point out the parallel between our own bodies, and to show to the fabricated depictions of horrific human suffering which are witnessed, through media on a daily basis.
- The Southern Cross: to Bear and Behold (2009)
