= Katherine Hattam =

Australian artist born in Melbourne

- Born: 1950; Melbourne, Victoria, Australia
- Education: Melbourne University; Victorian College of the Arts; Deakin University
- Known for: Painting, drawing, collage, printmaking, sculpture

Katherine Hattam (born 1950) is an Australian artist. Her work is in the collections of the National Gallery of Australia, National Gallery of Victoria, Queensland Art Gallery, University of Queensland, Queensland University of Technology, Artbank, Heide, Art Gallery of South Australia, Deakin and La Trobe Universities, Warrnambool Art Gallery and Bendigo Art Gallery. She is the mother of artist William Mackinnon.

== Career ==
Hattam obtained a BA in Literature and Politics from Melbourne University in 1974 and held her first exhibition at George Paton & Ewing Gallery in 1978. In 1992, she was awarded a MFA by the Victorian College of the Arts, and in 2004 she was awarded a PhD by Deakin University.

Hattam has won the Banyule Prize and the Robert Jacks Drawing Prize, and has been a finalist in the Dobell Prize, the Geelong Contemporary Arts Prize, the Tidal Art Award, and the Sulman Prize. Her portrait, Helen Garner speaks French, was a finalist for the 2022 Archibald Prize.
