= Virginia Fraser (artist) =

Australian artist (1947–2021)

Virginia Fraser was born on 28 December 1947 in Melbourne, Victoria. She was an Australian artist, writer, curator and advocate for women artists. Her art practice consisted mainly of video and installation works, often made in collaboration with Destiny Deacon. Fraser died on 26 January 2021, aged 74.

== Education and career ==
Fraser completed a Bachelor of Arts (Media Arts) at Phillip Institute of Technology and a Master of Fine Arts at the Victorian College of the Arts.

In the 1980s she began making Super 8 films. From the 1990s Fraser worked in photography, video and installation in collaboration with her creative and life partner, Destiny Deacon.

She was a member of the City of Melbourne's Acquisitions Panel for many years and encouraged its purchase of works by First Nations artists as well as assisting with its visual arts programs.

Fraser worked with curator Natalie King to compile Deacon's archive for Walk & don't look blak, an exhibition held at the Museum of Contemporary Art in Sydney in 2004. She subsequently worked with the National Gallery of Victoria to prepare Deacon's retrospective DESTINY.

In May 2019 Fraser and Deacon were invited to be the inaugural visiting artists/scholars at the Australian National University School of Art and Design's First Nations' First Person workshop and lecture program.

== Collections and notable works ==
Examples of Fraser's photography work, digitally remastered Super 8 films and videos created jointly with Destiny Deacon are held in the National Gallery of Australia, National Gallery of Victoria, Museum of Contemporary Art Australia and Queensland Gallery of Modern Art.

=== Notable works ===
'Snow storm', with Destiny Deacon. In 2007, Sebastian Smee when reviewing the National Indigenous Art Triennial wrote of this piece:

...there is one work in it I couldn't get out of my mind...Two plinths support glass boxes. Inside the boxes are golliwogs suspended in, and mostly obscured by, a sea of white polystyrene balls. It's a simple work, but it's scathing. On the most general level it's about framing: about how a dominant culture frames the people it has subordinated...thus modern Australia convinces itself that it is protecting its indigenous inhabitants, but just as often it suffocates them, even while maintaining a racist, sentimental image of them.

Commissioned centrepiece video (title unknown) for Moomba: What's in a name? (Melbourne Town Hall, 2008). This video explores the ambiguity of the word Moomba. Fraser interviews some of Aboriginal leader Bill Onus' then surviving family members and linguists with knowledge of Indigenous languages. Although the video asks the question, it does not provide an answer.

== Exhibitions ==
Cultural warriors, National Indigenous Art Triennial, National Gallery of Australia, Canberra, 2007 (contributing artist)

Making a show of it, Melbourne Town Hall, Melbourne, 2008 (curator)

The Australian group show, Photographers Gallery, South Yarra, date unknown (with Brian Windridge, Jilian Gibb and Fiona Hall)

Eye in hand, Roar Studios, Fitzroy, date unknown (with Maria Rita Barbagallo, Merilee Bennett, Linda Brassil, Ann Storm, Ruth Thompson and Jenni Viney)

== Selected publications ==
- Fraser, Virginia, ed. (1974). A Book about Australian women. Jerrems, Carol (photographer). North Fitzroy, Vic.: Outback Press. ISBN 978-0-86888-007-5. OCLC 1365981.
- Bellear, Lisa; Fraser, Virginia; Hall, Barbara (2008), The central business dreaming: Melbourne's indigenous arts and culture (1st ed.), City Of Melbourne, Arts And Culture Branch, Indigenous Arts Program, ISBN 978-0-9775563-3-5
- Ford, Sue; Finch, Maggie, (curator,); Fraser, Virginia, 1947-, (writer of added commentary.); Lakin, Shaune A., (writer of added commentary.); Langton, Marcia, 1951-, (writer of added commentary.); Ennis, Helen, (writer of added commentary.); National Gallery of Victoria. Ian Potter Centre (host institution.) (2014), Sue Ford, Melbourne, Vic. National Gallery of Victoria, ISBN 978-0-7241-0382-9

== Death ==
Virginia Fraser died in Melbourne on 26 January 2021. Announcing the news of her death, the National Gallery of Australia wrote: "we remember Virginia as one of the most rigorous and sustained advocates for women’s contributions to the cultural life of this country".
