= Anne Marsh (artist) =

Australian sculptor and academic

Anne Marsh is an Australian feminist art theorist. As of 2022 she is a professorial research fellow at the Victorian College of the Arts.

== Career ==
Originally trained as a sculptor in the 1970s, Marsh first was involved with sculpture performances, often identifying with the emerging feminist art movement in Australia. She was a member of the Women's Art Movement, and was amongst the group of women artists who contributed to Lip magazine. She was art critic for the Herald-Sun 1994–97.

Marsh is well known as a feminist art theorist and has published many essays, journal articles, exhibition catalogues and reviews in Australia and internationally. Monograph publications include a survey of performance art in Australia Body and Self: Performance Art in Australia, 1969–1992 and photography and modernism from the nineteenth century onwards – The Darkroom: Photography and the Theatre of Desire

She has also received Australian Research Council (ARC) Discovery grants as sole researcher and as part of a team around the areas of photography, video and performance.

In 2017, she did a three-month residency at the Norma Redpath House and Studios.

As of 2022, she is professorial research fellow at the Victorian College of the Arts.

== Works ==
- Body and self : performance art in Australia 1969–92 (1993) Oxford University Press
- The Darkroom : photography and the theatre of desire (2003) Macmillan
- Pat Brassington: This is Not a Photograph, (2006) Quintus an imprint of the University of Tasmania
- Look! Contemporary Australian Photography (2010) Macmillan
- Performance, Ritual, Document (2014) Macmillan
- Doing feminism : women's art and feminist criticism in Australia (2021) The Miegunyah Press
