= Louise Weaver =

Australian artist

- Born: 1966 (age 59–60); Mansfield, Victoria
- Education: Royal Melbourne Institute of Technology
- Style: installation; sculpture

Louise Weaver (born 1966) is a contemporary Australian artist working in an array of media including sculptural installations, paintings, drawings, printmaking, collage, textiles, movement and sound. She is best known for her installation and sculptures of animals. Weaver's works have been exhibited in Australia and New Zealand and are featured in major collections both nationally and internationally.

== Biography ==
Weaver was born in 1966 in Mansfield, Victoria, Australia.

She completed a Bachelor of Arts in 1988 at Royal Melbourne Institute of Technology, and a Masters of Arts, Painting in 1996 at Royal Melbourne Institute of Technology.

She is best known for her large-scale installations featuring sculptures of animals. Since 2014, Weaver has concentrated on creating works that she says are, “loosely termed” paintings using a wide range of materials and matter. Weaver's works have been exhibited in Australia and New Zealand.

She won the Cicely and Colin Rigg Contemporary Design Award in 2003 for textiles.

A retrospective of Weaver's work was shown at Buxton Contemporary in 2019.

== Selected exhibitions ==
- 2003: Moonlight Becomes You, City Gallery Wellington, New Zealand and Dunedin Public Art Gallery, Dunedin, New Zealand
- 2006: Taking a chance on love – Selected works 1990–2006, McClelland Sculpture Park and Gallery, Victoria, Australia
- 2019: Between Appearances: The Art of Louise Weaver, curated by Melissa Keys, Buxton Contemporary, University of Melbourne, Melbourne, Australia

== Collections ==
- The British Museum, London, United Kingdom
- Art Gallery of New South Wales, Sydney, Australia
- Queensland Art Gallery | Gallery of Modern Art, Brisbane, Australia
- National Gallery of Victoria, Melbourne, Australia: 1 work (as of March 2020): Sparkling dew-covered branch)
- Museum of Contemporary Art Australia, Sydney, Australia: 1 work (as of March 2020): It would seem that eyes can live without hearts (Oracle Fox), 2005
- National Gallery of Australia, Canberra, Australia: 3 prints and 3 sculptures (as of March 2020)
- Monash University Collection, Melbourne, Australia
- Art Gallery of South Australia, Adelaide, Australia
- Chartwell Collection, Auckland Art Gallery, New Zealand
- Bendigo Art Gallery, Victoria, Australia
- Artbank, Sydney & Melbourne, Australia
- Malaysian Institute of Management, Kuala Lumpur, Malaysia
- Dubbo Regional Art Gallery, Australia
- Wollongong University Collection, Australia
- The Michael Buxton Contemporary Australian Art Collection, Melbourne, Australia
- City of Stonnington Art Collection, Melbourne, Australia
- Queensland University of Technology Art Museum, Brisbane, Australia
- Faculty of Science Collection, Monash University, Melbourne, Australia
