= Deborah Kelly =

Australian artist

- Born: 1962 (age 63–64); Melbourne, Australia
- Occupation: Artist

Deborah Kelly (born 1962) is a contemporary Australian artist known for her eclectic, uplifting, socially-engaged and activist art. Her artistic practice ranges from collages to posters, postcards, banners, billboards, photography, installation, performance, events, video and drawing. Kelly regularly collaborates and contributes to collectives to address political issues including LGBTIQ+ rights, asylum for refugees and climate change. Her work is included in major national and international exhibitions and events. These include: All About Women, Sydney Opera House (2022); The National, Sydney (2021); the Biennale of Sydney, Sydney (2014); the Thessaloniki Biennale of Contemporary Art, Greek State Museum of Contemporary Art, Greece (2014); and the Singapore Biennale, Singapore (2008).

== Biography ==
Deborah Kelly was born on Wurundjeri/Boon Wurrung Country, in Narrm (Melbourne) in 1962. She currently lives in Sydney.

== Career ==
Throughout the 1980s, Kelly worked as a cartoonist. Her work was published widely and exhibited alongside well-known cartoonists including Kaz Cooke and Judy Horacek in Out of Line, 1991. In 1988, she began making work for galleries alongside a growing public art practice. Kelly was a key member of the activist collective boat-people.org, which projected imagery onto the Sydney Opera House in 2001. Footage of the guerilla act was later shown in galleries. In 2016, Kelly completed a Masters of Fine Art at UNSW Art & Design, resulting in her graduating exhibition Scenes from the Death of Books at UNSW Galleries. Kelly's current major project, Creation, is a new religion of revolutionary and sacred ideas, rituals, imagery and events.

== Major works ==
- No Human Being is Illegal (in all our glory): Created for the 19th Biennale of Sydney (2014), this work is a series of 20 life-sized, nude portraits featuring such figures as Kelly's father and well-known artist Ramesh Mario Nithiyendran. In collaborative workshops, each portrait was collaged with flora and fauna. The series forms part of Google Arts and Culture's highlights of the Biennale and received critical coverage in Tania Leimbach's article "Glory be! Inside Deborah Kelly's No Human Being is Illegal" for The Conversation. Museums & Galleries NSW toured the series toured to 12 regional galleries. With the addition of a further portrait of Danny Smith, the series was acquired by the Wellcome Trust in London.
- The Gods of Tiny Things: This video collage of dancing fantastical creatures explores pleasure and the threat of climate change. It was created collaboratively on Yuin Country and exhibited at the Australian Centre for the Moving Image (ACMI) in 2021.
- Hey Hetero! (2001): is a collaborative photo-media project made with Tina Fiveash. The series of glitzy, advertisement-style imagery uses text to poke fun at heterosexual norms and relationships. The work has been translated into multiple languages and remade in diverse formats for sharing in public and private spaces.

== Collections ==
- Artbank, Sydney
- Queensland Art Gallery, Brisbane
- Wellcome Trust, London
