= Catriona Moore =

Australian art historian

Catriona Moore (born 1956) is an Australian art historian, art theorist and academic.

== Background and research interests ==
Dr. Catriona Moore's education and research since the 1970s has explored modernism, Australian feminist art, environmental and comparative post-colonial visual art. As a member of the Artworkers Union Affirmative Action for Women in the Visual Arts committee in the 1980s, Moore's career has been dedicated to feminist art and activism in Australia. More recently Moore has contributed to collaborative feminist projects such as FavourEconomy and JANIS I: Feminism in Contemporary Art: If Not Why Not?, as recorded in the Australian Feminist Art Timeline. Moore is co-founder of the research cluster Contemporary Art and Feminism through which she has curated exhibitions, presented conference papers, published books and articles, and convened discussions and symposia. Moore is Senior Lecturer, School of Letters, Art and Media (SLAM), Department of Art History, the University of Sydney.

== Selected publications ==
Moore is author and editor of multiple publications that have developed Australian feminist art discourse.

- Contemporary Art and Feminism, co-edited with Jacqueline Millner (Routledge, 2021) ISBN 9780367492243
- Future Feminist Archive - Live in Wollongong! co-written with Jo Holder. (Wollongong Art Gallery, 2019).
- How the Personal Became (and Remains) Political in the Visual Arts, co-written with Catherine Speck. In Everyday Revolutions: Remaking Gender, Sexuality and Culture in 1970s Australia, edited by Michelle Arrow and Angela Woollacott. (ANU Press, 2019). ISBN 9781760462963
- Feminist Perspectives on Art: Contemporary Outtakes, co-edited with Jacqueline Millner (Routledge, 2018). ISBN 9781138061811
- Feminist Curating: The First Hundred Years. In Curating Feminism, edited by Jacqueline Millner. (SCA/University of Sydney, 2014). ISBN 9781921558023
- The more things change: Feminist aesthetics, then and now (Artlink Feature, 01 September, 2013).
- Not just a pretty picture: art as ecological communication. In Water Wind Art and Debate. How environmental concerns impact on disciplinary research, edited by Gavin Birch. (Sydney University Press, 2007). ISBN 9781920898656
- 'Margaret Preston at home'. In Radical Revisionism: an anthology of writings on Australian art, edited by Rex Butler. (IMA Brisbane, 2005). ISBN 1875792554
- Indecent Exposures: Twenty Years of Australian Feminist Photography (Allen and Unwin, Sydney, 1991) ISBN 1863731628
- Dissonance: Feminism and the arts 1970-1990 (Allen and Unwin, Sydney, 1991) ISBN 978-1-86373-325-0
