= Elizabeth Gertsakis =

Greek-Australian artist

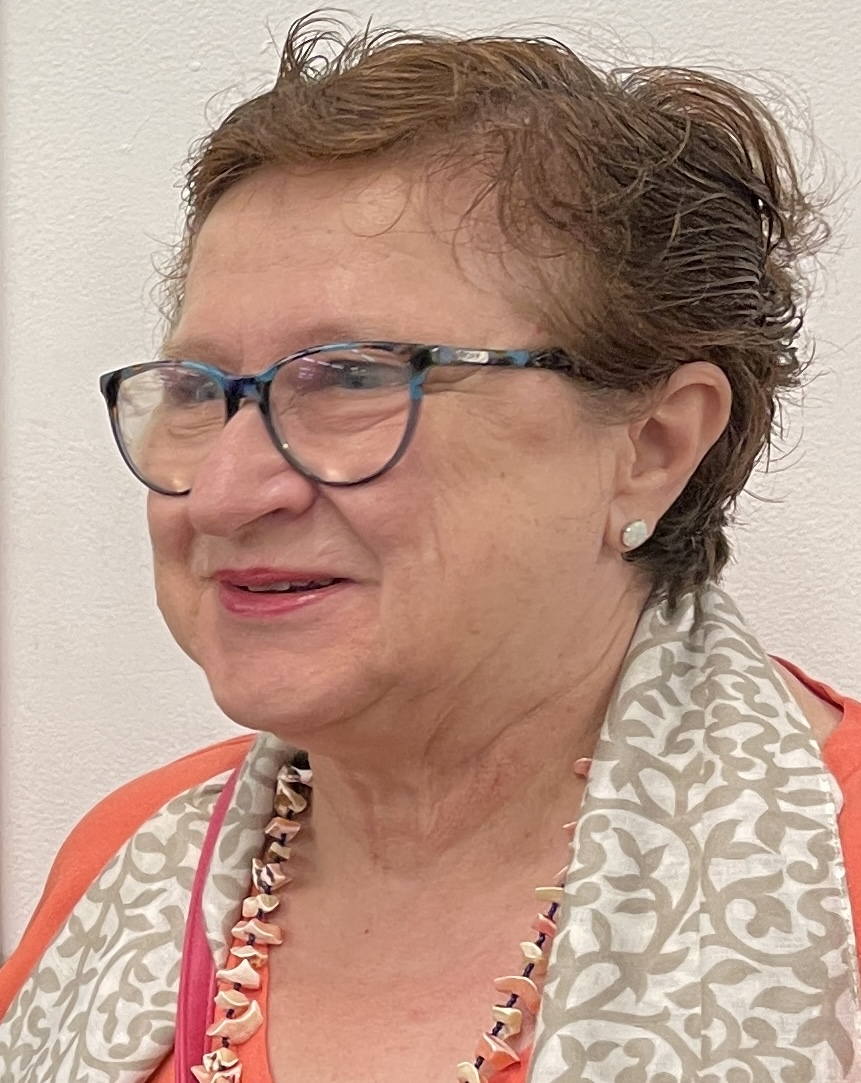
Elizabeth Gertsakis in 2025

Elizabeth Gertsakis (born 1954) is an Australian visual artist and photographer known for her use of archival photographic images in installations that highlight cultural and intercultural perspectives.

== Early life and education ==
Gertsakis was born in 1954 in Florina, Greece from a Greek and Slavic family background. Her family emigrated with her to Australia when she was 3 months old.

She studied art, critical theory and English literature, graduating from the University of Melbourne and Monash University and started her work as a visual artist in 1986.

== Career ==
From 1976 to 1993 she lectured in art history and Australian cultural studies and worked as a curator in Australian museums and galleries between 1995 and 2011. She was senior curator of the Australia Post National Philatelic Art and Design Collection from 1995 – 2010. Her doctoral research at the University of Melbourne focuses on the uses of photography in the Southern Balkans & Northern Greece.

Her works deal with the personal and social influence on the everyday lives of women in culture and public institutions and her artwork has been exhibited in Australian public galleries, including the Geelong Art Gallery, the National Maritime Museum, Art Gallery of South Australia, the Art Gallery of Western Australia, the Australian National Gallery, Griffith University Collection and Waverley City Gallery.
