= Eva Benson =

Australian sculptor (1875–1949)

Eva Ellenor Benson
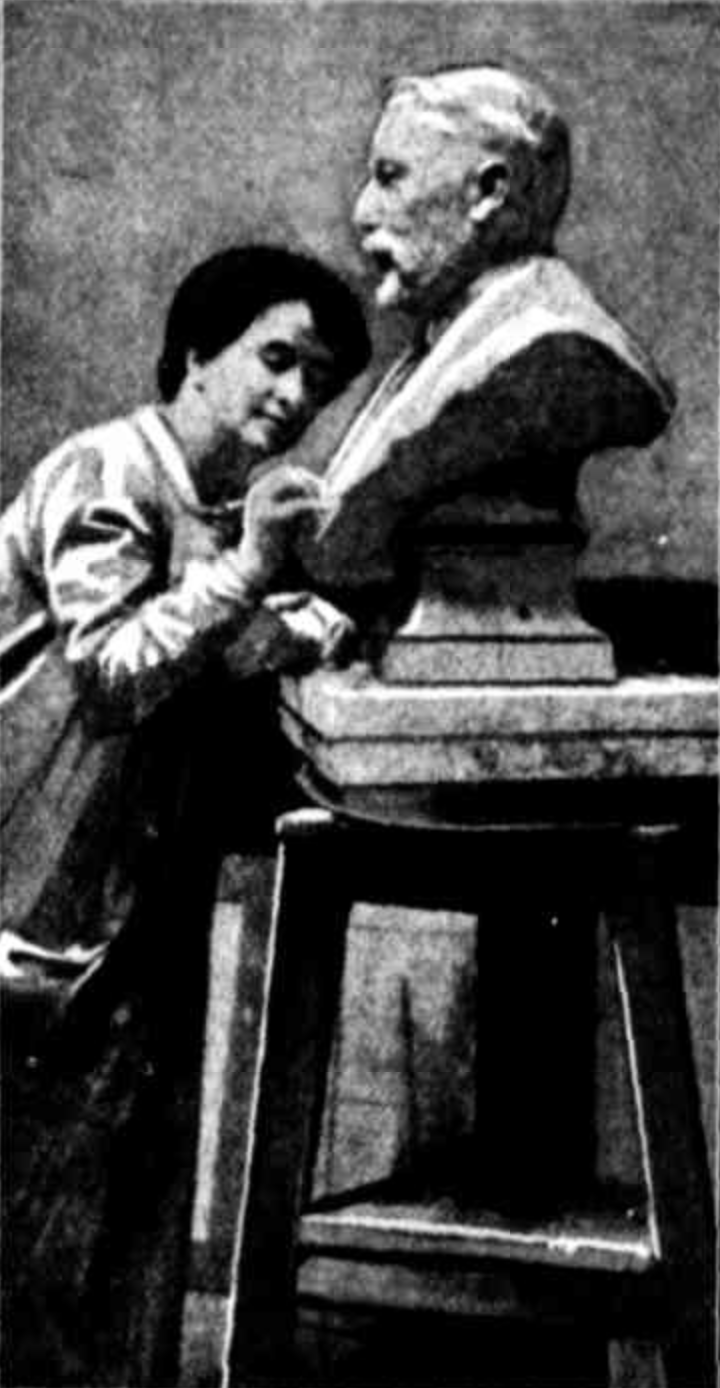
- Working on her bust of Sir Winthrop Hackett
- Born: 23 March 1875; Gawler, South Australia
- Died: 16 March 1949 (aged 73); Mosman, Australia
- Education: Regent Street Polytechnic; City and Guilds of London Art School
- Known for: Sculpture

Eva Ellenor Benson (23 March 1875 – 16 March 1949) was an Australian sculptor who produced portrait studies, figure works and medallions. Benson spent part of her career working in Britain.

== Biography ==
Benson was born and brought up in Gawler in South Australia and, after training and teaching in Perth, moved to England sometime around 1911. There she studied at the Regent Street Polytechnic in central London, where she won a number of awards. After a further period of study at the City and Guilds of London Art School, Benson worked from a studio at St John's Wood in west London. She produced portrait and figure sculptures, statuettes and medallions, in bronze, plaster and marble. While in London, Benson exhibited works at the Royal Academy and with the Society of Women Artists. In 1917 and 1918, she also exhibited at the Royal Scottish Academy, the Royal Glasgow Institute of the Fine Arts and at the Royal West of England Academy in Bristol. Benson returned to Australia in 1920 where she held a teaching post in Sydney and undertook some large architectural commissions. She died in the Mosman suburb of Sydney in 1949.
