= Linde Ivimey =

Australian sculptor (born 1965)

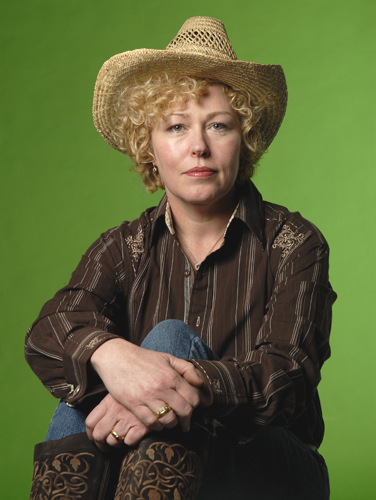
- Born: 1965 (age 60–61); Sydney, Australia
- Education: Claremont School of Art
- Known for: Sculpture

Linde Ivimey (born 1965) is an Australian sculptor.

== Biography ==
Linde Ivimey was born in Sydney, Australia and obtained a Diploma of Fine Art in both printmaking and sculpture at the Claremont School of Art in Perth. She taught at the school from 1993 to 1995 and also lectured at the West Australian School of Art from 1996 to 1998. In 2003, her debut exhibition at Melbourne's Heide Museum of Modern Art proved critically and financially successful.

Since her debut, Ivimey has participated in notable exhibitions such as Bone Idol in Berlin, Germany (2014), the Blake Prize for Religious Art (2000), in Sydney; and Materiality at Royal Melbourne Institute of Technology Gallery (1999), to name a few. Prizes received include Gomboc Sculpture Award (1992), the SECWA Fremantle Art Award (1991), and Friends of Dorothy Award for Sculpture, Perth. Her collections can be seen in many galleries including: National Gallery of Victoria, National Gallery of Australia, HOTA - Home of the Arts, University of Queensland Art Museum, Rockhampton Museum of Art and Hugo Collection.

Ivimey considers herself a visual artist. She is well known for her use of recycled materials, often incorporating bone and skin, primarily that of bird, sheep and fish, into large scale statues and small detailed figures. She draws upon many skills from welding to cooking, weaving, wood-sculpture, and sewing. To some her work is considered macabre. Her reaction to this was recorded as saying “I can accept they’re a little bit macabre and confronting,” she states. “But when people say ‘oh, that’s weird, I couldn’t stand that in my home’, I gently remind them that I'm not that keen on floral couches, but if they've invited me to sit on one, I'm not going to tell them.”

== Personal life ==
In 2013, Ivimey was diagnosed with breast cancer, and hinted at this in her solo show Brave to the Bone at Martin Browne Contemporary in Sydney. One of the sculptures entitled Bandaid Bunny (a self portrait) appears admitted and sitting in a doctor’s waiting room. Other works related to her experience of depression while ill, with the "black dog" featuring heavily. After the show, Ivimey began cataloging her work as "BC" and "AD", which she explained as "before cancer and after diagnosis".

== Solo exhibitions ==
2021

Bonafides, Jan Murphy Gallery, Brisbane

Objects within, HOTA-Home of the Arts, Gold Coast

2018

Conversations with a caterpillar, Jan Murphy Gallery, Brisbane

2017

The Shape of Things, Martin Browne Contemporary, Sydney

2015

Cross My Heart, Jan Murphy Gallery, Brisbane

2014

Bone Idol, Michael Reid, Berlin

Brave to the Bone, Martin Browne Contemporary, Sydney

2013

Highlights from ‘If Pain Persists’, Cairns Regional Gallery, QLD

2012

If Pain Persists: Linde Ivimey Sculpture, University of Queensland Art Museum, Brisbane

Take Two, Jan Murphy Gallery, Brisbane

Set in Bone, Martin Browne Fine Art, Sydney

2009

New Works, Martin Browne Fine Art, Sydney

2007

New Works, Martin Browne Fine Art, Sydney

2006

Only the Memory, Gould Galleries, Melbourne

Old Souls ~ New Work, Martin Browne Fine Art, Sydney

2003

Close to the Bone, Heide Museum of Modern Art, Melbourne

== Selected group exhibitions ==
2022

Form, Bundaberg Regional Art Gallery, QLD

Welcome Home, Rockhampton Museum of Art, QLD

2021

HOTA Collects – Linde Ivimey: objects within, HOTA - Home of the Arts, QLD

Savour, Bundaberg Regional Art Gallery, QLD

2019

Love, Tweed Regional Gallery, NSW

Counterparts, Rockhampton Art Gallery, QLD

TRACE, West End (multiple locations), Brisbane

2018

The Erskine Pledge: a gift to Newcastle, Newcastle Art Gallery, Newcastle

Jan Murphy Gallery, spring 1883, Melbourne

So Fine – Contemporary women artists make Australian history, National Portrait Gallery, Canberra

The Gift: Art, Artefacts and Arrivals, Museum of Australian Democracy, Canberra

2017

Apologies to Roadkill, Godinyamayin Yijard Rivers Arts & Cultural Centre, NT

2016

Jan Murphy Gallery, spring 1883, Melbourne

Ceremonial, Craft Victoria, Melbourne

Love...more than a four letter word, Caboolture Regional Gallery, QLD

I Prefer Life: works from the Reydan Weiss collection, Weserburg, Bremen, Germany

We Are Here: An exploration of contemporary portraiture as a response to hatred and hope, Glen Eira City Council Gallery, VIC

Hidden: Rookwood Cemetery Sculpture Walk, Rookwood Cemetery, NSW

2015

Fantastic Worlds, Rockhampton Art Gallery, QLD

Discerning Judgement, Supreme Court Library Queensland, Brisbane

Martin Browne Contemporary, art central, Hong Kong

Australian Contemporary Art, Australian Embassy Berlin

2014

12 Days of Christmas, Jan Murphy Gallery, Brisbane

2013

Martin Browne Contemporary, Auckland Art Fair

Martin Browne Contemporary, Sydney Contemporary Art Fair

Australia: Contemporary voices, Fine Art Society, London

Gathering II, Wangaratta Regional Gallery, VIC

Diorama, Woollongong Regional Art Gallery, VIC

Sculpture at Bathers Beach, Kidogo House, Perth

2012

Walking With Alice, South Australian School of Art, Adelaide

Multiply, Hastings City Art Gallery, Hawkes Bay, New Zealand

Hello Dollies, Penrith Regional Art Gallery, NSW

Murr-mur, Michael Reid, Berlin

2011

Martin Browne Fine Art, Auckland Art Fair

2010

Martin Browne Fine Art, Melbourne Art Fair

2009

University of Queensland National Artists’ Self-Portrait Prize, University of Queensland Art Museum, Brisbane

Martin Browne Fine Art, Auckland Art Fair

Women In The Bible, The Jewish Museum, Melbourne

2008

Autumn Catalogue, Martin Browne Fine Art, Sydney

New Works by Gallery Artists, Martin Browne Fine Art, Sydney

Melbourne Art Fair, Martin Browne Fine Art

Bal Taschit, The Jewish Museum, Melbourne

2007

Winter Catalogue, Martin Browne Fine Art, Sydney

Autumn Catalogue, Martin Browne Fine Art, Sydney

Summer Exhibition, Martin Browne Fine Art, Sydney

Blood Lines, Hawkesbury Regional Gallery, NSW (followed by national tour)

Culture Trackers, 24 Hour Art Centre, Darwin

Martin Browne Fine Art, Auckland Art Fair

2006

Summer Exhibition, Martin Browne Fine Art, Sydney

Strange Cargo: Contemporary Art As A State Of Encounter, Newcastle Regional Gallery, NSW (followed by national tour)

2005

Martin Browne Fine Art, Auckland Art Fair

Bread, Bones & Babies, Blindside, Melbourne

Natural Selection, Linden Gallery, Melbourne

New Haven, Uber Gallery, Melbourne

2004

Martin Browne Fine Art, Melbourne Art Fair

Heavenly Creatures, Heide Museum of Modern Art, Melbourne

2003

National Sculpture Prize & Exhibition, National Gallery of Australia, Canberra

The Makers Craft, Counihan Gallery, Melbourne

2001

National Sculpture Prize & Exhibition, National Gallery of Australia, Canberra

Menagerie, The Gold Treasury Museum, Melbourne

2000

The Blake Prize for Religious Art, S.H Ervin Gallery, Sydney

Sculpture Survey, Gomboc Sculpture Gallery, Perth

1999

Materiality, RMIT Project Space, Melbourne

The Tactile Art Award, Object Galleries, Customs House, Sydney

1998

Gomboc Gallery, Australian Contemporary Art Fair, Perth

Exhibition Buildings, Melbourne

Millennium, Gomboc Sculpture Gallery, Perth

1997

Aspects of Fremantle, The Mores Building, WA

I, Shadow, Australian Galleries, Melbourne Festival

New Collections Gallery, Perth

1996

Sculpture Survey, Gomboc Sculpture Gallery, Perth

Bravado, Delaney Galleries, Perth

Field Day, Ballidu Contemporary Art Society, WA

Eggsamples, WA Ostrich Company, Perth

The Monaro Show, Fremantle Art Centre, WA

1995

Plot, Kalla Yeedip Gallery, WA

Substantial Stuff, CSA Gallery, Perth

Homocraft, Craftwest Gallery, Perth (followed by national tour)

1994

In Spirit & Form, Bunbury Galleries, Bunbury, WA

1993

Taugman, The Ties That Bind, Perth Institute of Contemporary Art, WA and The Australian Centre, Manila

Life Size, Lawrence Wilson Gallery, Perth

Heavier Than Air, Perth Institute of Contemporary Art, WA

Skin, Perth Institute of Contemporary Art, WA

1992

Advantages Of Isolation, Blaxland Gallery, Sydney

When I'm 69, Delaney Galleries, Perth, WA

Body Contact, Perth Gallery, WA

Nexus, Access Contemporary Gallery, NSW

City Challenge, Art Gallery of Western Fremantle Art Award, Energy Museum, WA

National Women's Arts Festival, Tin Sheds Gallery, Sydney

Please Be Seated, Museum Of Western Australia, Perth

== Publications ==
- 50 Most collectable Artists, Australian Art Collector, Issue 51, p. 206, January- March 2010
Collins Artists Diary, 2010
- 50 Most collectable Artists, Australian Art Collector, Issue 47, January- March 2009
- Boccalate, Suzanne. Hair, Trunkbooks, Series 1, pp. 37- 41, May 2009
- What Now, Australian Art Collector, Issue 48, pp. 106- 107, April- June 2009
- 50 Most Collectable Artists, Australian Art Collector, Issue 43, pp. 144- 147, January–March 2008
- McDonald, John. From Eerie to Equine, Sydney Morning Herald (Spectrum), pp. 16 –17, 29 September 2007
- Baum, Caroline. Linde Ivimey: From Birth to Earth, Sydney Morning Herald (Spectrum), 3 September 2007
- McCulloch, Alan Susan and Emily, Linde Ivimey in The New McCulloch’s Encyclopedia of Australian Art, Australian Art Editions, p. 545, The Miegunyah Press 2006
- Clarke, Deborah. Front Cover Art Monthly, number 191, July 2006
- Mitzecich, Nick. Strange Cargo: Contemporary Art As A State Of Encounter, Newcastle Region Gallery, pp. 40- 41, represented by image and text, Printed on the occasion of the touring exhibition, 2006
- Reid, Michael. Linde Ivimey, Good Weekend/Sydney Morning Herald, p.17, 17 September 2005
- Kiely, Annemarie. Obsessions, Belle Magazine Australia, pp. 38-42, January/February 2005
- Gellatly, Kelly. Close To The Bone, Heide Museum of Modern Art Melbourne, p. 24 (Illustrated), Winter 2003
- Taylor, Elena & Chandler, Rebecca. Sculpture in Focus, artonview, Issue 33, pp. 17-23, Autumn 2003
- Taylor, Roger. Catalogue of a life, World Sculpture News, vol 7, no. 4, PP. 38- 41, Autumn, 2001
- James, Bruce. God Moves in Mysterious Ways, Sydney Morning Herald (Spectrum), P. 2, 2 December 2000
- Turley, Dir. Louise. Artists At Work: Linde Ivimey, ABC TV, First screened on ABC TV Australia, 14 August 2000

== Private and public collections ==
- National Gallery of Australia
- National Gallery of Victoria
- HOTA - Home of the Arts Collection
- University of Queensland Art Collection
- Rockhampton Museum of Art
- Reydan Weiss Collection
- Holmes à Court Collection
- Hugo Collection
- Keating Collection
- Liz & Lloyd Horn Collection
- Newcastle City Art Gallery
- Wanneroo City Council
- Western Australia School of Art, Design & Media

== Awards ==
- Creative Design Award, City of Perth & Challenge Bank
- Gomboc Sculpture Award, Perth
- Design Award, AIDS Council of WA
- Friends of Dorothy Award for Sculpture, Perth
- Outstanding Achievement, Channel 10 Young Achievers Award
- Inaugural State Energy Commission of WA & Fremantle City Art Award
