= Felicity Colman =

Felicity Colman (born 1967) is an Australian academic and Creative Media Arts theorist. She is Professor of Film and Media Arts. She is the Dean of Research and Knowledge Exchange for the London College of Fashion at University of the Arts London

== Education ==
Colman holds the following qualifications:

- Bachelor of Arts in Literary Theory and History of Art from the University of Queensland
- Bachelor (Hons) Fashion and Textile Design from Sydney College of the Arts, University of Sydney
- Master of Arts in Australian Art from Monash University
- PhD in Art History and Screen from the University of Melbourne

== Career ==
Colman was the head of The Graduate Research School (2017–2019) at Kingston University, London, United Kingdom. Colman held a Professorial Chair in Media at Manchester School of Art, Manchester, United Kingdom. where she held various positions in art and media at the Manchester School of Art from 2009 to 2017. Prior to this Colman held a number of positions at University of Melbourne, Melbourne, Australia.

Colman is honorary professor at the School of Art, College of Design and Social Context RMIT, Melbourne, Australia (2019–2023). From 2020 Colman is Visiting Research Fellow, Global Centre for Humanities in Technology [GCTH], Kyung Hee University, South Korea. In 2005 Colman was visiting associate professor in Screen Media, Screen Theory Department, The University of Waikato, New Zealand. In 2001, Colman was Smithsonian Research Scholar, at the National Gallery of Art Washington DC, US.

Colman's specialities include visual art, culture, and screen media forms, and creative philosophy.

== Academic work ==
- Colman, F., and Van der Tuin, I. (2024).Methods and Genealogies of New Materialisms.
- Colman, F., Bühlmann, V., O’Donnell, A. and van der Tuin, I. (2018). Ethics of Coding: A Report on the Algorithmic Condition [EoC]. H2020-EU.2.1.1. – INDUSTRIAL LEADERSHIP – Leadership in enabling and industrial technologies – Information and Communication Technologies. Brussels: European Commission. 732407, pp. 1–54.
