= Hiromi Tango =

Australian artist (born 1976)

Hiromi Tango is a contemporary artist working predominantly with textiles in installation and performance art. Tango was born in 1976 on the Japanese island of Shikoku. Tango graduated from a Bachelor of Arts at the Japan Women's University in Tokyo, Japan. The artist lives and works in Tweed Heads, Australia with her partner artist Craig Walsh.

== Practice ==
Tango interacts with a wide variety of textiles, often in lurid colours, creating sculptures and costumes for performances. For her work, Tango gathers textiles that are intensely personal, either to herself or those donating the textiles, letters and diaries entwined in the forms. The artist wraps and weaves thread, string, wool and cloth creating dense webs of clashing colours and textures.

== Colour ==
Tango cites strong emotions tied to individual colours, such as the happiness of yellow in her 2014 work Dust Storm. Tango's most recent body of work continues her exploration of the therapeutic applications of fluorescence in her 2013 immersive installation Dance at the Museum of Contemporary Art Australia.

== Community engagement ==
In advance of a 2015 exhibition Art Magic: Remnant at Lismore Art Gallery, Tango developed "art recipes" to enable anyone participating to share in a simplified version of her art practice. In 2012, Tango created a major installation Pistil at the Queensland Art Gallery/Gallery of Modern Art for the exhibition Contemporary Australia: Women. For the installation, Tango aimed to challenge social boundaries by engaging the personal histories of those involved in the making process. Tango uses the analogy of "wrapping emotions".

== Awards ==
2014 Hiromi Hotel: Moon Jellies, Hazelhurst Regional Gallery & Arts Centre project, Local Government NSW Arts and Cultures Award 2013 Australia-Japan Foundation, The Department of Foreign Affairs and Trade, Australia 2012 Asialink, Melbourne 2011 Qantas Encouragement of Contemporary Art Award 2011 Just One Less Social Sculpture Project, Arts and Health Australia Award 2010 Art Is In Regional Arts Award, Mackay Regional Council, Artist in Residency Project 2010 Regional Arts Development Fund, Arts Queensland 2009 Brisbane Airport Fresh Cut, Institute of Modern Art, Brisbane 2008 Development and Presentation Grant, Arts Queensland, Brisbane 2007 Kick Start, Next Wave Festival, Melbourne

== Exhibitions ==
Hiromi Tango has been featured in over 14 solo exhibitions in Australia, New Zealand and Belgium. Her exhibition history also includes over 20 group exhibitions, 10 performances and installations, children's projects and mental health projects. In 2013, Tango created a major work Traces - Blue for the Setouchi Triennale in Japan in collaboration with her partner Craig Walsh.

== Links ==
- Artist's website
- Artist's page on Sullivan+Strumpf Gallery
