= Countess Report =

Australian artist-run research project

The Countess Report is an independent artist-run research project led by artists Amy Prcevich, Elvis Richardson, Miranda Samuels and Shevaun Wright; although it often welcomes guest collaborators. Its aim is to achieve gender parity and recognition for Australian women artists. To do so it publishes data and analysis on trends in gender representation, arts education, the distribution of arts funding and media representation in the Australian art sector. The report is published every four years and its aim is both to advocate for the arts industry in Australia and serve as a piece of artwork in and of itself.

The results of the report are regularly reported in mainstream and arts media leading to policy changes in major galleries including the Art Gallery of New South Wales and the National Gallery of Australia. The report is credited for inspiring gender equity programs at both galleries.

== The report ==
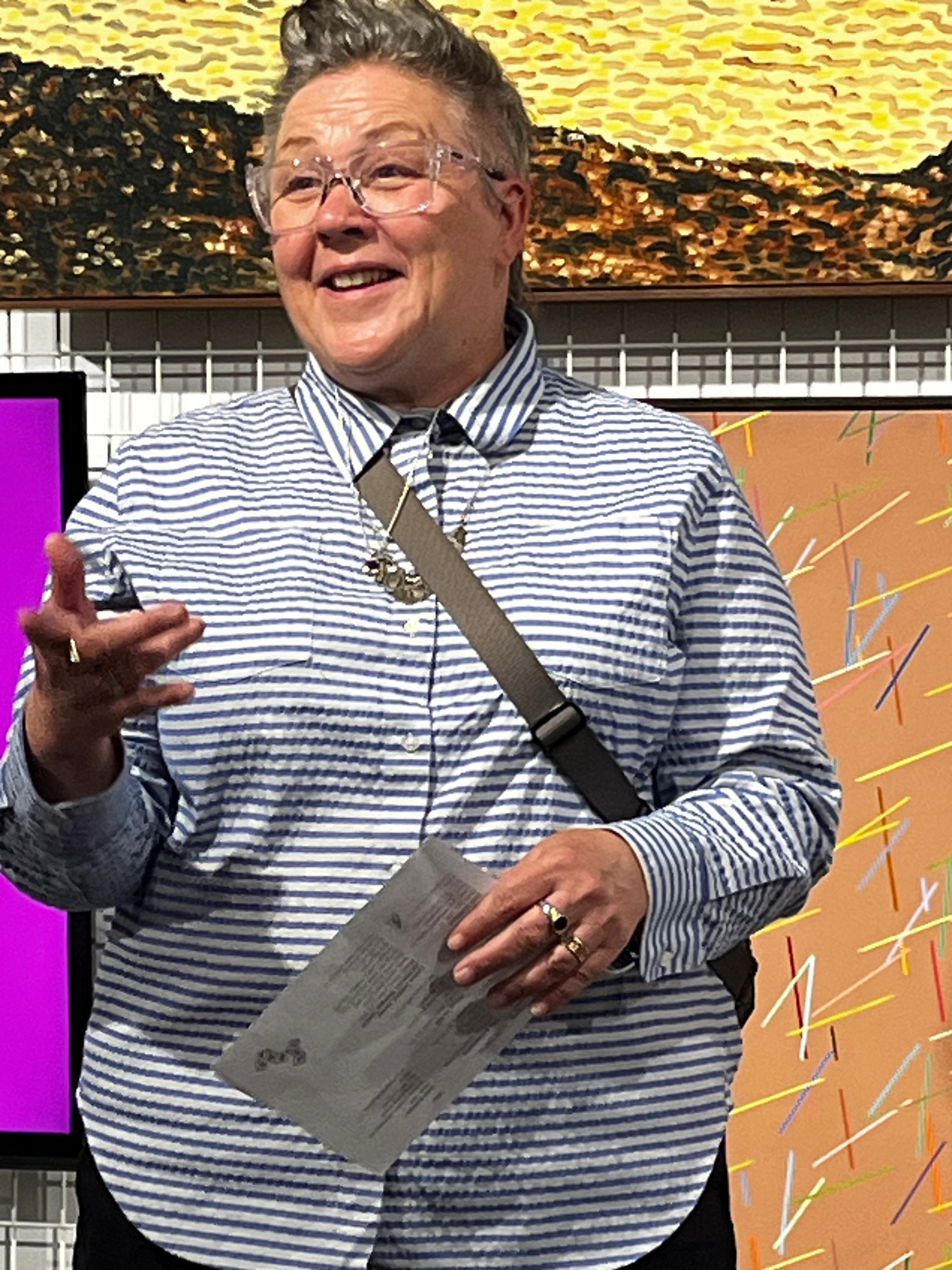
Elvis Richardson speaking about a Countess.Report focused exhibition at Artbank Sydney in 2024

The report was first released in 2008 by Richardson on her blog called CoUNTess to make more data publicly available about the lack of gender representation in major galleries. It has continued to develop since then and has the backing of the National Association of Visual Artists, Creative Australia and the Sheila Foundation.

The first formal report was published in 2014 and was followed by reports in 2018 and 2022. Data is gathered from more than 450 galleries and museums as well as from approximately 22,000 artists. The 2022 report, which was launched in May 2024, showed that the proportion of women artists exhibiting across 7 of 9 gallery types declined between 2018 and 2022. Women only accounted for 33.6% of exhibiting artists in state galleries and only 30.5% of artists in major museums. This shows a drop from the 2014 report when 37% of exhibiting artists were women and 2018 when the number was 34%.

The 2022 report showed that men continued to dominate in gallery representation with the exception of the opposite trend for First Nations artists where women significantly outnumber men; there is, however, increased representation of non-binary identified artists. The 2022 report also showed that, in most gallery types, First Nations artists were underrepresented in solo exhibitions and that representation ranged from 6.5% in artist-run initiatives, 7% in major museums and 26% at university and state galleries.

== The National Gallery of Australia ==
In early 2019 the National Gallery of Australia, under the directorship of Nick Mitzevich, began undertaking collection analysis by gender in collaboration with the Countess Report. The gallery found that 25% of the Australian art collection and 33% of the First Nations collection were by women artists and of acquisitions made between 2014 and 2018 only 27% of the artworks were by women.

To address this the gallery acknowledged the imbalances and introduced a five-year gender equity action plan in 2022 in which it committed to the 50-50 gender representation target. The gallery also began the Know My Name (exhibition), which opened in November 2020, to shine the spotlight on female artists.

From these initiatives the National Gallery increased its representation significantly from the proportion of women artists in exhibitions being 25% in 2018 to 84.4% in the 2022 report and is recognised by the Countess Report as the top performing major gallery.

== Additional resources ==
The Countess Report is also the commissioning partner of Clear expectations: guidelines for institutions, galleries and curators working with trans, non-binary and gender diverse artists (2019). This guideline is a best practice guide for working with trans, non-binary and gender diverse creatives.
