= Graham Smith =

Graham Smith may refer to:

== Arts and entertainment ==
- Graham David Smith (1937–2021), British artist and writer
- Graham Smith (photographer) (born 1947), British photographer
- Graham Smith, violinist in String Driven Thing and Van der Graaf
- Graham Smith (born 1979), lead singer of Kleenex Girl Wonder
- Graham Smith (artist), Canadian artist

== Sport ==
=== Association football ===
- Graham Smith (footballer, born 1946), British footballer
- Graham Smith (footballer, born 1947), British footballer & manager
- Graham Smith (footballer, born 1951), British footballer
- Graham Smith (soccer, born 1994), American soccer player
- Graham Smith (soccer, born 1995), American soccer player

=== Cricket ===
- Graham Smith (Leicestershire cricketer) (1923–1997), English cricketer
- Graham Smith (Durham cricketer) (1950–2012), English cricketer
- Graham Smith (Australian cricketer) (born 1964), New South Wales cricketer

=== Other sports ===
- Graham P. Smith (1898–1967), American football executive
- Graham Smith (Canadian swimmer) (born 1958), Canadian swimmer
- Graham Smith (rower) (born 1975), British rower
- Graham Smith (Bermudian swimmer) (born 1982), Bermudan swimmer

== Other people ==
- Graham Smith (activist), British Republican activist
- Graham Smith (physicist), British physicist
- Graham Smith (pilot) (1919–1951), combat fighter pilot and U.S. Army Air Corps Officer with the Tuskegee Airmen
- Graham Smith (Māori academic) (born 1950), New Zealand academic
- Graham Smith (milliner) (born 1938), British milliner
- Graham Smith (priest) (born 1947), former Dean of Norwich
- Graham F. Smith (died 1989), Australian humanitarian
- Graham M. Smith (born 1966), British political theorist

== See also ==
- George Stuart Graham-Smith (1875-1950), British pathologist and zoologist
- Francis Graham-Smith (1923–2025), British astronomer
- Graeme Smith (disambiguation)
- Grahame Smith
- Seth Grahame-Smith
