= Francesca da Rimini (artist) =

Australian artist

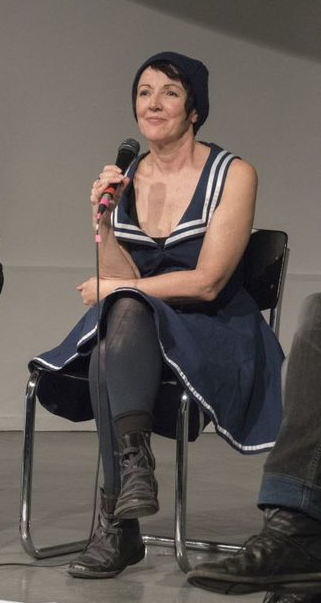
- Francesca da Rimini speaking at Disruption Network Lab in Berlin in 2015.
- Occupation: Artist
- Writing career
- Genre: Electronic literature
- Notable works: Doll Yoko (1998), hypertext Fleshmeat (1998)

Francesca da Rimini (aka Doll Yoko or GashGirl) is an Australian artist. With Josephine Starrs, Julianne Pierce, and Virginia Barratt she co-founded VNS Matrix, and the four artists coined the term cyberfeminist in 1991 to describe their art practice. Da Rimini has been working in new media since 1984.

In addition to her work with VNS Matrix, Francesca da Rimini is known as the creator of online artwork Doll Yoko (1998) and hypertext Fleshmeat (1998), which explores the virtuality of women online.

She has created netspaces that feature a particular character or personae and contributes to many projects. She has participated and performed in notable conferences in the 1990s, including TISEA (Sydney 92), SIGGRAPH (Chicago 92), FISEA (Minneapolis 93), ISEA (Helsinki 94), YYZ (Toronto 95), Ars Electronica (Linz 96), and CyberCultures (Sydney 97).

Her works are in collections, including the Victoria and Albert Museum, Richard L. Sandor (USA), Museum of Contemporary Art, Helsinki, and Griffith Artworks (AUS).

Francesca da Rimini is from Adelaide in Australia.
