= Mindy Seu =

American designer and academic (born 1991)

- Born: 1991
- Alma mater: Harvard University; University of California, Los Angeles
- Occupation: Graphic designer, teacher, designer, university teacher, artist
- Employer: Rutgers University; Yale University
- Website: mindyseu.com

Mindy Seu (born 1991) is an American designer, researcher and technologist whose work focuses on public engagement with digital archives. She is best known for her Cyberfeminism Index project and publications, and is currently on the faculty at UCLA's Design Media Arts Department.

== Early life and education ==
Seu grew up in Orange County, California, where her parents ran a flower shop after immigrating from South Korea. She graduated from the University of California, Los Angeles with a B.A. in Design Media Arts in 2013 and later graduated from the Harvard Graduate School of Design with an M.Des in 2019.

== Career ==
After graduating from UCLA, Seu worked at the Museum of Modern Art's Design Studio, as well as the design studio 2x4 on the Interactive Media team. She also taught at the California College of the Arts, and published her own archival projects, including the web-based archive of Avant Garde Magazine and a digitization of Emmett Williams' 1968 concrete poem Sweethearts.

From 2017 to 2018, Seu published the web archives for Eros and Fact magazines, completing the digitization of Ralph Ginzburg and Herb Lubalin's iconic publications. In 2018, Seu also became a fellow at the Internet Archive and Harvard's Berkman Klein Center for the Internet & Society. Starting in 2019, she began work on an archive of cyberfeminism, which later received the Design Studies Thesis Prize from Harvard University Graduate School of Design. Seu's Cyberfeminism Catalog project began as a spreadsheet, a medium she often employs for its legibility and longevity, and was supported by Rhizome and a grant from the Graham Foundation. The project was exhibited virtually through the New Museum in 2020 and ultimately published as a 700-page print book, Cyberfeminism Index, in January 2023. Cyberfeminism Index featured contributions from academics and collectives including VNS Matrix, Donna Haraway, Legacy Russell, Sadie Plant, and the Old Boys Network.

In 2022, Seu received a MacDowell Fellowship. She has previously served as an assistant professor at Rutgers' Mason Gross School of the Arts, and as a critic at Yale School of Art.

She is currently serving as an associate professor at the University of California, Los Angeles Design Media Arts Department. She is also curating an exhibition titled Cantando Bajito: Chorus at the Ford Foundation Gallery and developing a series of lecture performance pieces titled A Sexual History of the Internet, in collaboration with Julio Correa.

== Selected works ==
- Sweethearts (2013)
- Avant Garde Archive (2014)
- Eros Archive (2017)
- Fact Archive (2018)
- Cyberfeminism Catalog: 1990–2020 (2019–)
- Cyberfeminism Index (2023)
- A sexual history of the Internet (2025)
