= Li-Cam =

French SF writer

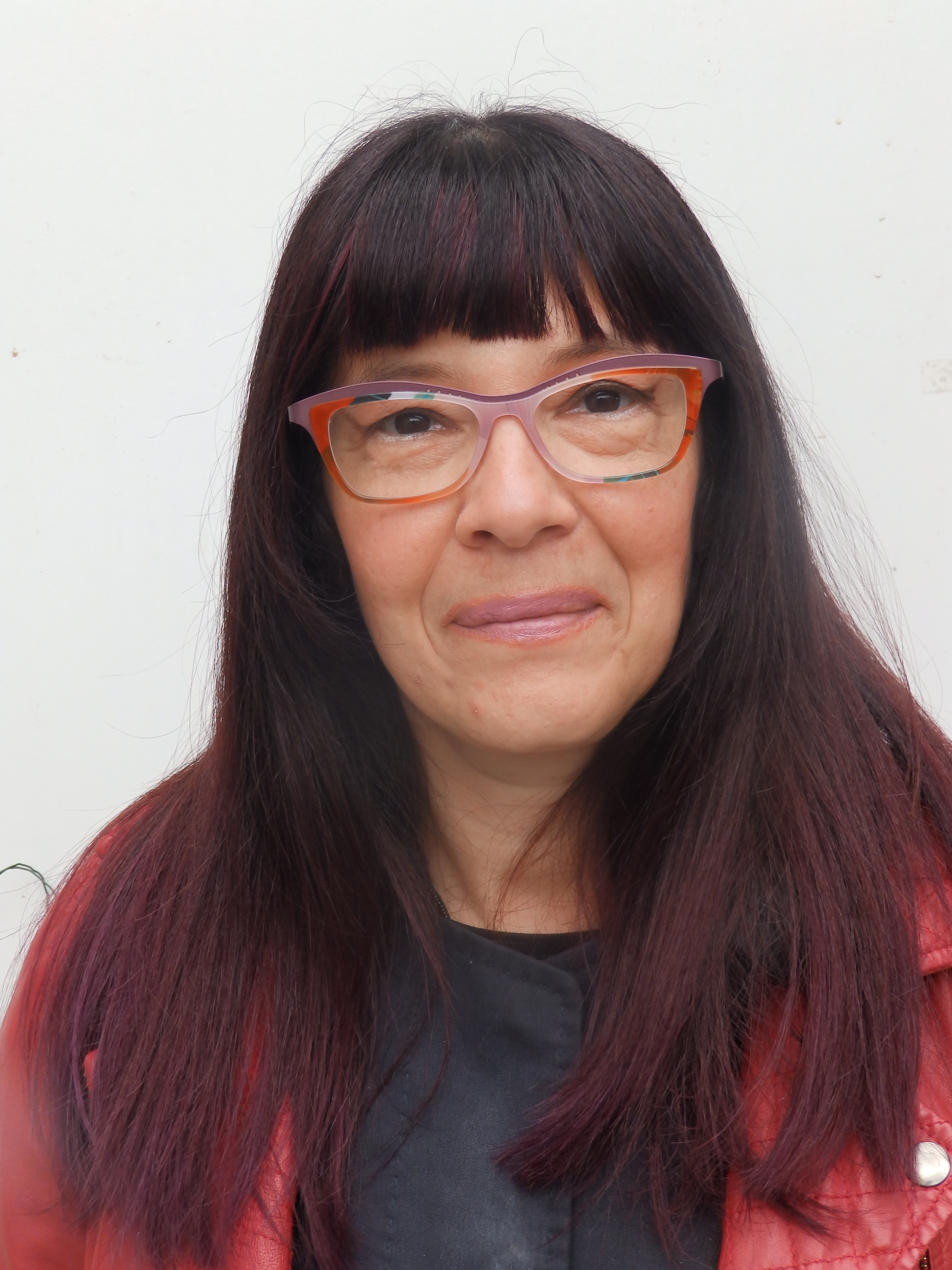
- Born: April 17, 1970; Lyon
- Occupation: writer

Li-Cam (born April 17, 1970 in Lyon), is a French author of short stories and novels in the science fiction and fantasy genres. Her works deal with issues of difference, including autism, and some can be classified in the cyberpunk sub-genre. Her short story Asulon was awarded the 2016 Bob-Morane prize. Active in bringing science fiction to the general public, she is notably involved in the exhibition Code: Food. Explore the future of your plates exhibition in Toulouse. She is also literary director of the collection Petite Bulle d'Univers at Organic Editions, co-founder of MI+ and a creativity coach.

== Biography ==
Li-Cam, was born on April 17, 1970 in Lyon. At 10, she began writing on the advice of a psychologist. She had been reading science fiction, which she describes as her ‘first love’, since 12 and cites the authors Robert Heinlein, Franck Herbert and Philip K. Dick. Among the feminist science fiction novels that have marked her career, she cites Ursula K. Le Guin's The Left Hand of Darkness, which opened new perspectives for her around gender norms and Donna Haraway's Cyborg Manifesto, which served as a basis for her treatment of themes relating to artificial intelligence. From 17 to her 20, she was a member of several electro groups, including IAV. She played a lot of role-playing video games (RPGs) like Final Fantasy and World of Warcraft in the 1990s and early 2000s.

After studying labour law and a number of courses in behavioural psychology, she joined a recruitment agency, from which she resigned in 2002. She then went on to work for a major pharmaceutical laboratory, before setting up her own business as a creativity coach, while continuing her literary career.

Since 2004, she was appointed literary director of the Petite Bulle d'Univers collection at Organic Editions. From 2017 to 2019, she was collection director at Labo de Mü. She also co-founded MI+ with Mathias Echenay, Stuart Pluen-Calvo and Davy Athuil to promote to the public the original approach of science fiction to questioning our present and understanding its alternatives.

== Works ==
Li-Cam's career as an author began in 2004 with the publication of Alice en son for intérieur by Organic Éditions. In La Petite Bébêth, which was followed by Boboth, she evoked two themes that would come back regularly throughout the rest of her work: her childhood and high-functioning autism.

In the first two volumes of Chroniques des stryges, Li-Cam reinvented the vampire myth with her ‘stryges’, beings separated from Homo sapiens by a genetic incident. The second volume, Însângerat was one of the favourites of Jean-Luc Rivera, organiser of the Sèvres Festival and member of the jury for the Grand prix de l'Imaginaire, who praised the originality and psychological complexity of the characters.

In 2015, her novel Asulon was previewed at the Imaginales festival in Epinal. It evokes cyberpunk themes, such as ‘a machine created at the beginning of time that can see into the future’. Author and critic Xavier Mauméjean described her story as ‘masterly’, in which the author ‘combines poetry and reflection’. The novel won the 2016 Bob-Morane prize.

Cyberland, published in 2017, deals with brain implants, artificial intelligence and virtual worlds, all themes of the cyberpunk sub-genre. Science fiction journalist Marcus Dupont-Besnard pointed out that the cyberspace conceived by the author served as the setting for a reflection on themes such as gender identity, the quest for self, sexuality, freedom and artificial intelligence. The author was also influenced by Donna Haraway's Cyborg Manifesto. For Xavier Mauméjean, one of the short stories in the collection, Saïd in Cyberland, is part tale, part allegory, part epistolary tale, is original in both form and content.

In her short story Le Profil, published in the collection Demain Le Travail by La Volte in 2017, she tells the story of a super profiler who can influence the desires of the people around her.

For her book Resolution, published in 2019, she drew inspiration from the Cambridge Analytica scandal and the role played by social media in the Brexit or the election of Donald Trump and placed tech, from artificial intelligence to biopiles, at the centre of her utopia. An utopia that should enable a small number of people to provide for their daily needs, their intellectual comfort and their psychological well-being. It earned her a quotation in Ariel Kyrou's book Dans les imaginaires du futur, published in 2020, which compared her thoughts on artificial intelligence to those of authors John Brunner and Greg Egan.

== Publications ==
=== Novels ===
- Alice en son for intérieur. Organic éd. 2004. ISBN 978-2-9523101-0-9. OCLC 420282646.
- La Petite Bébeth. Organic éd. 2005. ISBN 978-2-9523101-2-3. OCLC 470401504.
- Tête à tête. Organic éd. 2005. ISBN 978-2-9523101-1-6. OCLC 419723761.
- Fuite de fluide. Organic éd. 2006. ISBN 978-2-9523101-3-0. OCLC 421783429.
- Avis de grand froid pour les sardines. Audiocite.net. 21 June 2008.
- Li-Cam; Philippe Aureille (2008). L'Ombre de l'arbre abattu. Organic éd. ISBN 978-2-9523101-4-7. OCLC 470591509.
- La Chimère aux ailes de feu : Laboratoire de nouvelles à lire dans l'ordre afin de reconstituer la chimère. Griffe d'encre éd. 2012. ISBN 978-2-917718-52-0. OCLC 816549755.
- Boboth, la machine à rêver. Organic Ed. 1 April 2013. ISBN 978-2-9523101-7-8.
- Asulon. Griffe d'encre éditions. 2015. ISBN 979-10-92349-11-5. OCLC 912835955.
- Cyberland. 2017. ISBN 979-10-92961-77-5. OCLC 1029838959.
- Résolution. 2019. ISBN 978-2-37049-084-1. OCLC 1134673467.
- Cyberland. 2020. ISBN 978-2-35408-798-2. OCLC 1252906697.

==== Serie Chroniques des Stryges ====
- Lemashtu : Chroniques des stryges. Griffe d'encre éd. 2009. ISBN 978-2-917718-05-6. OCLC 470769837.
- Însângerat. Vol. 2. Griffe d'encre éd. 2014. ISBN 979-10-92349-02-3. OCLC 887513383.

=== Short stories ===
- Rédemption pour un Stryge. Spootnik, coll. Khimaira. 2005.
- Une espèce de Monstre(s). Elegy. 2006.
- Mémoires de Terre. Griffe d'Encre. 2007. ISBN 978-2-9529239-5-8.
- La Muette. Catharsis, coll. Borderline. 2007.
- La Petite fille au cœur de marbre. Griffe d'encre. 2007. ISBN 978-2-9529239-0-3.
- Maudite Providence. Malpertuis, coll. Lovecraftiana. 2007. ISBN 978-2-917035-02-3.
- Qui sommes-nous ?. ActuSF. 2007. ISBN 978-2-9522502-8-3.
- La Frontière de Tamika. Glyphe. 2009. ISBN 978-2-35285-058-8.
- Luciole. CDS Editions. 2009. ISBN 978-2-9533562-2-9.
- Simulation LOVE. Griffe d'Encre. 2009. ISBN 978-2-917718-13-1.
- Celle qui n'a pas lieu d'être. CDS Éditions. 2011. ISBN 978-2-9533562-6-7.
- La Querelle des anges égarés. Hydromel. 2011. ISBN 978-2-918827-03-0.
- Lost in a foreign place. Mythologica. 2014. ISBN 979-10-93004-22-8.
- Zombie, zombie, zombie... Boom !. Griffe d'Encre. 2014. ISBN 979-10-92349-05-4.
- Le Profil. La Volte. 2017. ISBN 978-2-37049-034-6.
- Le Manuscrit du Phénix. Rivière Blanche. 2018. ISBN 978-1-61227-752-3.
- Monade Incarnate. ActuSF. 2018. ISBN 978-2-36629-947-2.
- Protocole d'urgence. La Volte. 2020. ISBN 978-2-37049-101-5.
- La Map d’Iris. ActuSF. 2022. ISBN 978-2-37686-455-4.
