= Lilia Chak =

Israeli interdisciplinary artist

- ליליה צ'ק
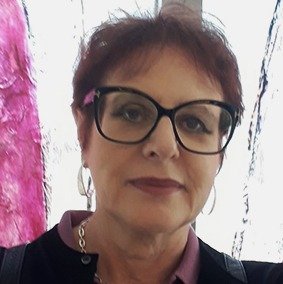
- Born: May 19, 1966 (age 60); Leningrad
- Citizenship: Israel
- Education: Saint Petersburg Stieglitz State Academy of Art and Design
- Occupations: Artist, curator, researcher
- Known for: Bio-art, Generative art
- Website: chak-art.gala-studio.com

Lilia Chak (Hebrew: ליליה צ'ק; born 19 May 1966) is an Israeli interdisciplinary artist, researcher and curator whose work explores the intersection of contemporary art, biology, ecology, and technology. Her practice includes generative art, AI art, video art, photography, and projects that incorporate living systems and computational processes.

== Early life and education ==
Lilia was born in 1966 in Saint Petersburg, Russia (then Leningrad, Soviet Union). She studied visual communication at the Stieglitz State Academy of Art and Design in Saint Petersburg, completing her MA in 1988.

She later pursued doctoral research in art and science at Sorbonne University in Paris, focusing on relationships between artistic practice, biological systems, and ecological research.

In 2024, Chak became a postdoctoral fellow at Bar-Ilan University in Ramat Gan, Israel, where her research focuses on the development perspectives of AI-based Bio-art.

== Career ==
After moving to Israel in 1990, Chak developed a multidisciplinary practice combining visual art and research-based methodologies. Her work addresses environmental systems, plant life, and the integration of biological and scientific processes into artistic production, as discussed in her book on Bio‑art and Dendro‑art published by Cambridge Scholars Publishing.

Her projects have been presented in international exhibitions and festivals dedicated to contemporary and new media art, including at Ars Electronica in Linz.

Her work has been discussed in newspapers, academic publications, and art magazines.

In addition to her artistic practice, Chak has been involved in academic teaching and research in the fields of art and ecology.

Chak has taught at Shenkar College of Engineering, Design and Art in Ramat Gan, where she serves as a lecturer in the Multidisciplinary Art School. She developed the course "Art, Biology and Ecology" and co-taught it with Maya Attoun.

Chak additionally curates the LASER Israel program, part of the international Leonardo/ISAST network.

== Artistic practice ==
Chak's work engages with bio-art and ecological art practices. Her projects incorporate plant materials, environmental data, and digital technologies to explore relationships between human and non-human systems.

She has used the term "dendro-art" to describe artistic practices that involve trees as material, subject, or living participants within artistic processes. Her research examines ethical and conceptual questions arising from the use of biological systems in contemporary art.

== Books ==
- 2023 - Chak, Lilia, Contemporary Practices in Bio-art: When a Tree Becomes an Artwork. Chak has used the term "dendro-art" to describe artistic practices involving trees in creative processes, which she characterizes as "a subdivision of bio-art".

== Other publications ==
- 2026 – Chak, Lilia. "Generative and Interactive Practices at LASER Talks Jerusalem." Leonardo, volume 59, issue 5. MIT Press. DOI: 10.1162/LEON.e.2775.
- 2026 – Chak, Lilia; Olga Kisseleva. "Adopters of Creative Technologies." In Bloomsbury Encyclopedia of New Media Art. Published digitally by Bloomsbury Publishing.
- 2026 - Chak, Lilia; Kisseleva, Olga. "Adopters of Creative Technologies". In The Encyclopedia of New Media Art: Volume 2: Artists & Practice. London: Bloomsbury.
- 2022 - Chak, Lilia. FEMeeting: Women in Art, Science and Technology 2022. Exhibition catalogue. Instituto de Medicina Molecular, Lisbon and Évora.
- 2019 - Chak, Lilia. Between Art and Science. Brochure for the exhibition "Listening To Trees Across The Jordan River". Negev Museum of Art, Beer-Sheva.
- 2009 - Chak, Lilia; Bleikh, Galina. Ferror. Journal of Postcolonial Cultures and Societies. ISSN 1948-1853.

== Selected exhibitions ==
- 2026 – Copy. Repeat. Disappear., video installation (selected for FILE Festival – Electronic Language International Festival, featured as the festival's official front visual image).
- 2025 – 59 Seconds, AI-art project exhibited at multiple international venues.
- 2025 - We Make Future. AI-art. Festival su Intelligenza Artificiale, Tecnologia e Innovazione Digitale, Bologna, Italy.
- 2024 – COLOR 2024, generative art project, CICA Museum, Gyeonggi‑do, South Korea.
- 2024 - Art and the World. Generative art. 10th Tashkent International Biennale of Contemporary Art, Tashkent, Uzbekistan.
- 2024 – Jerusalem Biennale 2023, Jerusalem, Israel.
- 2023 – Interwoven Scape, video installation, Shenzhen Art Museum, Shenzhen, China.
- 2022 - Our Bio-Tech Planet. Museo Orto Botanico organised by Art & Science Node Berlin, Rome, Italy.
- 2020 – EDEN, photographic works, Ars Electronica, Linz, Austria., Matsudo International Science Art Festival, Tokyo, Japan.
- 2020 – Speculating on the Future through Art and Science, photographic works, BOZAR, Belgium.
- 2019 – Listening to Trees across the Jordan River, installations, videos, and photographs, Negev Museum of Art, Beer‑Sheva, Israel.
