= Inventory Press =

American independent publisher

- Founded: 2014
- Founder: Adam Michaels, Shannon Harvey
- Country of origin: United States
- Headquarters location: Los Angeles, California
- Publication types: Books
- Nonfiction topics: Art, architecture, design, music

Inventory Press is a Los Angeles–based independent press that publishes books on art, architecture, design, and music.

Founded in New York City in 2014 by designers Adam Michaels and Shannon Harvey, the press relocated to Los Angeles.

== Publications and events ==
The press describes its focus as "subcultures, minor histories, and the sociopolitical aspects of material culture".

Its authors have included Susan Buck-Morss (Seeing–Making: Room for Thought, with Kevin McCaughey and Adam Michaels), Mindy Seu (Cyberfeminism Index), and Jordan Peele, whose annotated screenplays for the films Us and Get Out were published by the press. Titles published by the press have been the subject of reviews in publications including Hyperallergic (Blueprint for Counter Education: Expanded Reprint, a 2016 reissue of Maurice Stein and Larry Miller's 1970 work), Artforum (The Detroit Printing Co-op by Danielle Aubert, 2019), and Eye Magazine.

In 2025, the press was a resident at the MAK Center for Art and Architecture as part of the exhibition Reading Room, and together with Film at Lincoln Center presented The Other America: A Cosmology of Jordan Peele's Us, a screening and panel series organized around the annotated screenplay of Peele's film Us.

== Awards ==
Inventory Press books have been nominated for the Design Museum's Beazley Designs of the Year (A *New* Program for Graphic Design, 2020) and included in Hyperallergic's list of the 30 best art books of 2024 (Sci-Fi, Magick, Queer L.A.).
