= Nancy Paterson (artist) =

Canadian artist and writer

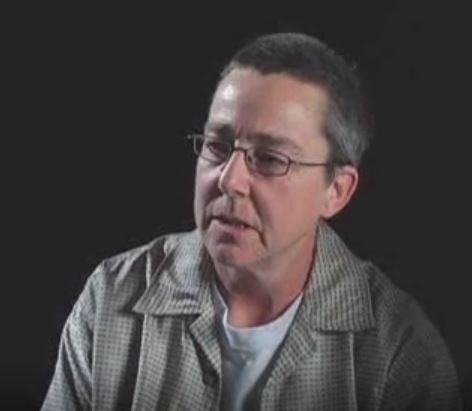
- Nancy Paterson, ca. 2006. Image from "Shifting Polarities: Exemplary Works of Canadian Electronic Media Art Produced Between 1970 and 1991" by Dr. Caroline Langill.
- Born: Nancy Evelyn Paterson; 1957
- Died: November 2018 (aged 60–61); Toronto, ON (Sunnybrook Hospital)
- Education: University of Toronto, York University (PhD, 2009)
- Occupations: Artist, writer
- Years active: 1980s–2018
- Known for: new media art and writing
- Notable work: "Cyberfeminism" (1996)

Nancy Evelyn Paterson (1957–2018) was a Canadian artist and writer known for her work in new media. She was an associate professor at the Ontario College of Art and Design University from 1990 to 2018, and was Facilities Coordinator at Charles Street Video, a non-profit, artist-run centre providing production and post-production facilities for digital video and audio.

Paterson was considered an important contributor to the cyberfeminist movement and to the discussion of the role of gender in electronically mediated experience.

Paterson was also known for her electronically-based artworks. Her 1998 work Stock Market Skirt connected the physical height of a skirt hemline with the real-time movement of the stock market. Her 1989 work Bicycle TV placed the viewer on a bicycle facing a video screen as the viewer cycled, then controlled their movement through scenes of the Canadian landscape projected before them.

Paterson curated the group show Disembodied at InterAccess Gallery in Toronto in 1997, which was one of the earliest exhibitions in Canada to include an online component.

== Early life and education ==
Paterson was born in 1957. She attended the University of Toronto, beginning her education at Victoria College without the intention of becoming a media artist. While ultimately graduating with an honours degree from Victoria College in 1985, Paterson decided to interrupt her academic studies to pursue a four-year program at the Ontario College of Art. During this time, Paterson teamed up with fellow artists Derek Dowden, David Andrews, Graham Smith, and Ed Mowbray to found the Artculture Resource Centre, Toronto's first media gallery, in 1979.

== Exhibitions ==
In 2018, Paterson's work was the subject of a retrospective entitled The Future: Before, at InterAccess gallery in Toronto. The exhibition, curated by Shauna Jean Doherty, surveyed Paterson's 30 year contribution to media art in Canada and internationally.

Two of Paterson's works, Stock Market Skirt and Garden in the Machine, are in the permanent collection of Surrey Art Gallery.

== Legacy ==
=== Cyberfeminism ===
Paterson's explorations into interactivity were significant for women entering early new media art practice, and her 1996 article Cyberfeminism is an influential paper in the field of art history. It was widely disseminated within online circles following its publication., The text articulated the ways in which novel forms of technology can reinforce gendered stereotypes, but can also empower marginalized populations to eschew dominant social narratives and forge new identities.

New electronic technologies are currently utilized to manipulate and define our experiences. Cyberfeminism does not accept as inevitable current applications of new technologies which impose and maintain specific cultural, political and sexual stereotypes. Empowerment of women in the field of new electronic media can only result from the demystification of technology, and the appropriation of access to these tools. Cyberfeminism is essentially subversive.

=== Interactivity ===
Paterson foregrounded interactivity as a condition of her art-making, believing that it is incumbent upon creatives living in a society with advanced technology to use that same technology to critique it. She was among a cohort of other Canadian new media artists who explored interaction between artworks and audiences. Describing her multi-media installation artwork Garden in the Machine, Paterson said:

“I suppose what I’m trying to describe is my increasing awareness of interactivity as an essential element of new electronic media art. I don’t necessarily agree with the perception that interactivity is the antithesis of a passive culture which has developed out of new electronic technologies. I think we’ve past that very quickly. ‘Surfing’ the web, for example (although it can be a lot like surfing on concrete at times) clearly relies on an interest in interaction. A lot like playing ‘Jeopardy,’ it’s true, a wealth of superficial information and trivia interspersed with some really valuable insights and opportunities for communication… but at whatever level people are accessing the web, they are moving out of their armchairs. People are tired of feeling manipulated – by technology, religion, politics – maybe it’s the approaching millennium – maybe it’s the legacy of post-modernism.”
