= Sollfrank =

Sollfrank is a German language surname. Notable people with the name include:

- Cornelia Sollfrank (1960), German digital artist
