= Stermitz =

Stermitz is a German surname. Notable people with the surname include:

- Evelin Stermitz (born 1972), Austrian artist
- Mercedes Stermitz (born 1958), Austrian racing driver
