= Graeme Smith (disambiguation) =

Graeme Smith (born 1981) is a South African cricketer.

Graeme Smith may also refer to:

- Graeme Smith (footballer, born 1982), Scottish football goalkeeper for Peterhead F.C.
- Graeme Smith (footballer, born 1983), Scottish football goalkeeper for Brechin City F.C.
- Graeme Smith (swimmer) (born 1976), Scottish Olympic swimmer
- Graeme Smith (badminton) (born 1978), Scottish badminton player
- Graeme Smith (journalist) (born 1979), Canadian journalist
- Graeme Smith (speedway rider) (born 1947), New Zealand motorcycle speedway rider
- Graeme N. Smith, Canadian obstetrician
- Graeme Smith (physicist), Canadian quantum physicist

== See also ==
- Graham Smith (disambiguation)
