= Linda Dement =

Australian artist (born 1960)

Linda Dement (born 1960 in Brisbane) is an Australian multidisciplinary artist, working in the fields of digital arts, photography, film, and writing non-fiction. Dement is largely known for her exploration of the creative possibilities of emergent technologies such as the CD-ROM, 3-D modelling, interactive software, and early computing.

== Career ==
Linda Dement began exhibiting in 1984. She graduated with a Bachelor of Arts (Fine Arts) from City Art Institute, Sydney in 1988.

Dement’s computing arts and still image works have been exhibited in Australia and internationally at galleries and festivals, including the Institute of Contemporary Arts in London, Ars Electronica in Austria, the International Symposium on Electronic Art in Sydney and Montreal, and the Impakt Festival in Europe. Dement is an alumnus of Australian Network for Art and Technology.

Collaboration is central to Dement's work. For Eurydice 1997–2007, Dement worked with American writer Kathy Acker. The intention was to cocreate an interactive digital piece, using Acker's novel about her cancer, Eurydice in the Underworld (1997), as a starting point. Acker died of cancer later in 1997. Dement continued with the project alone. Two of these works won the National Digital Art Award, in 2005 "Blue Plastic", and in 2006 "White Rose". George Alexander wrote of the work for Art Monthly Australasia, "Like exterminating angels, American writer Kathy Acker and Australian visual artist Linda Dement, shine a light on the dark and bloody depths of experience... These are images so corporeal and pitilessly physical, that you don't so much look at them as give them your fretful attention".

In "Bloodbath" (2010) at October 2010, Hordern Pavilion, Sydney, Australia, Dement worked with other artists to create an artwork using roller derby.

In tandem with Australian artist collective VNS Matrix, decades earlier, Dement's work pioneered Australian cyberfeminism in art. Cyberfeminist politics and poetics used technology to deconstruct gender stereotypes in mainstream culture, and proactively situated women in relation to the rise of electronic culture in the early 1990s. Through her work, Dement aims to "give form to the unbearable." Dement's work has been described as depersonalised autobiography, that is, an appropriation of the digital as a space of expression, or a "rupture" in the info-tech dominated sphere of computer culture. Her work explores the relationship between the physical body and the body politic, exaggerating female "other-ness" or the "monstrous-feminine."

Stephen Wright (2013) claimed Dement's work exemplifies "The politics of trauma – of what it means to struggle into identity, to carry childhood and the world, and its baleful interiors into that weird shifting space called adulthood and a supposed responsibility – is the politics of the ways in which that trauma is hidden, or re-directed, cathected to the consumer paradise or fused with cyberspace...And the reason why, as another critic has said, we don’t so much look at Linda Dement’s work as give it our 'fretful attention' is perhaps because it’s the end of the road. There is nothing beyond memory and desire, there is nothing beyond what we do to each other here and now, and how that is played out or hidden".

== Censorship ==
Some of Dement's early works have come under censorship by the Australian Government. Typhoid Mary was taken to the NSW Parliament as "obscene" and was subsequently rated by the Australian Classification Board as "not suitable for those under the age of 18." In My Gash also received a formal "Restricted" classification.

== Works ==
Works
Year	Title	Media	Notes
2009	The Ends of the Earth		a collaboration with Jane Castle
1995	Cyberflesh Girlmonster	CD-ROM	To make this work, Dement set up a stall as part of Artist Week at Adelaide Festival in 1994. She then digitally scanned 30 women's body parts of their choice. These scanned body parts were then digitally manipulated and reworked as "mutant" bodies to make up the work. Many of the "flesh donors" were Australian cyberfeminist artists present at the Festival.
1991	Typhoid Mary	CD-ROM	

== Writing ==
- Artists Thinking About Science (with Helen Watson-Verran et al.). Adelaide, S.A.: Australian Network for Art and Technology, 1994.
- I Really Want to Kill You But I Can't Remember Why (with Jasmine Hirst et al.). Woolloomooloo, NSW: Artspace Australia, 1995.
- "Girl #4 Late 70s," in Peter Blazey et al. (eds.), Love Cries. Sydney: Angus and Robertson, 1995
- "Payment," in Leonie Stevens (ed.), Warp Drive. Milsons Point, NSW: Random House, 1998
- Byte Me: art + culture + technology (with Kevin Murray et al.). Bendigo, Vic.: Bendigo Art Gallery, 1999

== Awards and prizes ==
- Dement was twice awarded the Harries Australian National Digital Art Award in 2005 and 2006, was awarded a New Media Arts Fellowship in 1996 and the Digital Futures Fund in 2010 by the Australia Council for the Arts, Best CD-ROM at the 9th Stuttgarter Filmwinter Festival in Germany; and Honorable Mentions by New Voices/New Visions, Palo Alto, California; and Ars Electronica, Austria.

== Residencies ==
- City of Sydney William Street Creative Hub, 2014
