= Prema Murthy =

Prema Murthy (born 1969 in Seattle, WA) is an American, multi-disciplinary artist based in New York. Employing aesthetics, gesture, geometry and algorithmic processes, Murthy's work explores the boundaries between embodiment and abstraction, while engaging in issues of culture and politics. Her work has been exhibited nationally and internationally at MoMA PS1, the Whitney Museum of American Art, the New Museum of Contemporary Art, the Reina Sofia Museum, the Generali Foundation in Vienna, and the India Habitat Center-New Delhi.

== Education ==
Murthy received a BA in Art History and Women's Studies from the University of Texas, Austin and MFA from Goldsmiths College, London.

== Career ==
Murthy's early digital art works from the 1990s - such as Bindigirl and Mythic Hybrid - are considered pioneering examples of internet art from a feminist perspective. These works explored the intersections of gender, race, and technology, while also utilizing the then-emerging tools of streaming media as a platform for performance art. These works contributed to the cyberfeminist art movement, while also drawing inspiration from postcolonial studies and feminist science fiction. In 2015 Murthy's work Bindigirl was included in the group retrospective "Come As You Are: Art of the 1990s".

In the 1990s Murthy also co-founded Fakeshop, an art collective that used early video conferencing technologies, interactive video and music software, and digital animation to create large scale performative installations. Fakeshop presented its work at venues such as Ars Electronica and SIGGRAPH, and was included in the 2000 Whitney Biennial, the first major American museum to include Internet art as a special category in its exhibition.

Murthy's recent work includes the use of 3D modeling tools to create large scale drawings, digital prints, and installation. These works make reference to the art of Futurism, Minimalism, and the Baroque. Her 2008 solo exhibit "Fuzzy Logic" at MoMA PS1 included a number of abstract, wireframe drawings as well as a room-sized installation of black yarn produced with the aid of 3D software. In 2010 Murthy used these techniques for her animated short "Monster," produced in collaboration with singer/songwriter Miho Hatori.

She has taught Digital Art at City College (CUNY) and Sarah Lawrence College, NY.

== See also ==
- Cyberfeminism
- Feminist art
- Internet art
- New media art
- Performance art
