= Cornelia Sollfrank =

German cyberfeminist artist

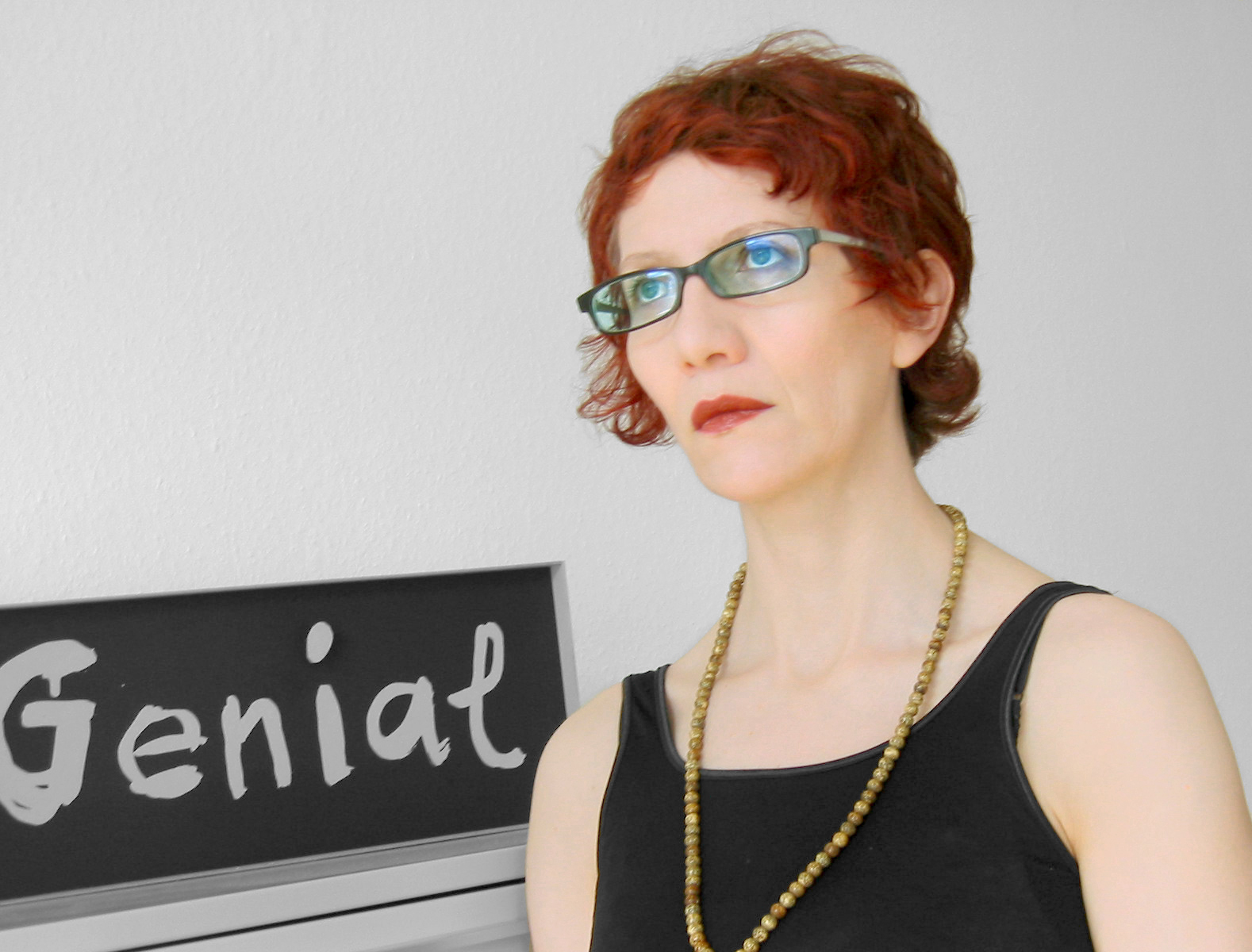
- Photo of Sollfrank in 2004.
- Born: 1960 (age 65–66); Feilershammer, Germany
- Education: Academy of Fine Arts Munich, University of Fine Arts of Hamburg, University of Dundee
- Known for: Internet Art, Cyberfeminism, Hacking

Cornelia Sollfrank (born 1960) is a German digital artist, she was an early pioneer of Net Art and Cyberfeminism in the 1990s.

== Life and work ==
Cornelia Sollfrank was born in 1960, in Feilershammer, Germany. Sollfrank studied painting at the Academy of Fine Arts, Munich (1987–1990) and fine art at the University of Fine Arts of Hamburg (1990–1994) and she completed a PhD in 2012 at University of Dundee.

In 1997, Sollfrank hacked the "world's first" net art competition, Extension, organized by the Hamburg Art Museum in Germany. Her work, titled Female Extension (1997) involved the creation of 289 computer-generated websites created by combing the Internet and combining fragments of HTML into exquisite corpse-like websites. Each website was submitted under the name of a different artificial female artist name and profile. No women were awarded prizes, but press releases distributed by Sollfrank received widespread attention for her intervention, overshadowing the gallery's own awards.

Cornelia Sollfrank founded the organization Old Boys Network (1997–2001). In 1997, Old Boys Network organized the Cyberfeminist International at documenta x in Kassel, Germany. Old Boys Network published First Cyberfeminist International in 1998 followed by next Cyberfeminist International in 1999. Closely associated with Cyberfeminism, Sollfrank has expressed reservations that it limits the perception of her work as "women's issues".

She has a history organizing and participating in digital protests. Solfrank has also founded the artist groups frauen-und-technik (Women and Technique) and -Innen ("Inside", but also a suffix for feminine plurals in German). Women Hackers (1999) was an essay on hackers, focusing on the lack of recognition of female hackers. Sollfrank is a member of the Chaos Computer Club, Europe's largest association of hackers.

In 2004, Cornelia Sollfrank's monograph titled net.art generator was published by Verlag für moderne Kunst Nürnberg.

== Early life and education ==
Cornelia Sollfrank was born in 1960, in Feilershammer, Germany. From 1987 to 1990, Sollfrank studied painting at the Academy of Fine Arts in Munich, and then during the years 1990 to 1994, she took the program Fine Art at the University of Fine Arts in Hamburg. Besides her study in diverse academic fields of art, Sollfrank also worked as a product manager for Philips Media from 1995 to 1996 in order to gain personal experience in the field of media. Since 1998, Sollfrank has focused on writing and exploring issues regarding the relationship among media, art and gender, and has worked as an educator at a variety of universities. In 2012, along with the publication of her PhD thesis titled Performing the Paradoxes of Intellectual Property, Sollfrank completed her doctor degree's practice-led research at the University of Dundee (UK).

From the mid-1990s, as Sollfrank probed the worldwide communication networks and mass media, she then transformed her traditional artistic strategies and art forms into the digital medium, and her works began to be closely related to the concerns of cyberfeminism, the interaction of feminism and art in the age of the Internet, and relationship between gender politics and the Internet.

== Career and activities ==
Cornelia Sollfrank (born 1960) is a German digital artist, conceptual artist, interdisciplinary researcher and university lecturer whose works mainly apply digital media and the internet as new ways of artistic practices to explore issues regarding mass media and network culture as new forms of (political) organization and communication structures, authorship, copyright and intellectual property, critical internet culture, feminism and techno-feminism.

Sollfrank is committed to activities related to cyberfeminism, she is one of the founding members of the worldwide cyberfeminist network Old Boys Network, and initiated and ran the network during the year 1997 to 2001. She also co-organized three international conferences on cyberfeminism which took place respectively in 1997, 1999, and 2001. In the year 1998 and 1999, she participated in co-editing the First Cyberfeminist International and the Next Cyberfeminist International.

As an early pioneer of Net Art and Cyberfeminism, Sollfrank also has experiences of organizing and participating in digital protests, she puts emphasis on issues of marginalization and the lack of recognition of female hackers in both mainstream and alternative cyborg communities. She is one of the members of the Chaos Computer Club, which is the largest association of hackers in Europe.

== Member of Old Boys Network ==
Cornelia Sollfrank is one of the initial founding members of Old Boys Network (OBN), which is a league constituted by cyberfeminist artists and activists, and Sollfrank describes it as a laboratory for politics of difference.

The term “OBN” is used to describe social and business connection among wealthy white men who often attend male-only elite schools, which also refers to a network of gender ritual and economic privilege where male members support each other to maintain their mutual benefits. Cyberfeminists adopted the term “OBN,” although the OBN was still in progress at that time, it “provided platforms for people drawn to cyberfeminism to meet, explore and critique digital technologies as well as the discourses in which they have been embedded” (Paasonen 2011, 339).

In 1997, with OBN, Sollfrank contributed to the display of the First Cyberfeminist International that was held in Documenta 10. Documenta is a major international exhibition of contemporary art which holds the show for 100 days and takes place every five years in Germany. During Documenta 10, OBN demonstrated and presented the ideas related to cyberfeminism, and kept the definition and recognition of the term cyberfeminism as open as possible to welcome difference and diversity. As it is stated in the First Report from the First Cyberfeminist International (CI), “there was a strong feeling voiced that this was an historic moment, that this week is a momentous launching of a visible, global presence of cyberfeminism as a networked movement in cyberspace.” According to Faith Wilding, cyberfeminism at this time started to “draw on social and cultural strategies from past waves of feminism” (Wilding 1998, 53), and the intervention of cyberfeminism here “could create possibilities of replacing coded, stereotyped, and standardized gendered representations of women with much more fluid, multivocal, recombinant, and hybrid images” (Wilding 1998, 55).

== Major works ==
=== Female Extension ===
In February 1997, Extension was announced by the Hamburger Kunsthalle, which was a competition for net artists and acted as a kind of virtual extension of the museum. In response to this competition, Sollfrank created the work Female Extension. Sollfrank designed a computer program that listed over two hundred female artists’ names which were actually fictional and simulated by Sollfrank herself. The computer program invented these names and made them look real through creating and assigning individual email addresses, IP addresses and phone numbers for each of them. In order to make this list seem more authentic, Sollfrank also designed another program which had the ability to script and recombine materials from other sites on the internet, and then she made up fake artworks and uploaded these works for each of the female artist on her list. While the entry of the competition closed, more than 120 megabytes of net art works had been uploaded and within these works, more than two-thirds of them came from female artists, however, the prizes were finally awarded to three artworks that were all produced by male artists.

The work acts as an institutional critique that reflects Sollfrank's feminist position, challenges the authority and fixity of conventional and organizational exhibition spaces, and turns viewers to participants to reconsider gender inequality in various art institutions. As it is mentioned by herself, Female Extension “turned the perception into a specific gendered issue by seizing on the original title and expanding it with a ‘female aspect’ — despite the fact that it plays with the technical notion of male and female plugs” (Sollfrank 2010, 5), and even though in the case of this work, “the museum itself refused to acknowledge the intervention as art, it was the critics and theoreticians specialized and knowledgable in Internet art who recognized the work so that it was subsequently included and discussed in all relevant literature” (Sollfrank 2010, 8).

=== Have script, Will destroy ===
In the year 2000, Sollfrank scheduled and did an interview with an anonymous female hacker who went by the name Clara G when they met at a hacker conference in Berlin. Sollfrank recorded their conversation and made it into a video with the title Have script, Will destroy. During this conversation, Clara G shared her experience as being a female hacker, they discussed issues related to the politics of hacking, the role gender played in the field of internet culture during the 1990s, and the way in which cyberspace was a challenging place for females to engage with and manipulate.

As Clara G stated in the interview, “my experience is that most hackers hate feminists. That would be reason enough for me to call myself a feminist. I’m not a big fan of ‘isms’ in general — like hackism J — but the fact is that we are far from having equal rights and opportunities for men and women. The big problem is that we need to be thinking about what strategies would actually work today” (Sollfrank 2000). Clara G also pointed out that feminism was essential, while it was still important and necessary for women to figure out what kind of feminist ideologies and feminist strategies they truly needed and pursued in the age of the internet.

The interview indicated that gender inequality, marginalization, underrepresentation, and lack of recognition of women in both mainstream and alternative cyber communities were still problems that women had to face in the internet culture during the 1990s. Sollfrank has also talked about issues regarding marginalized and ignored women in cyborg community in her essay “Women Hackers,” she stated that “no matter what area of application and no matter what the objective, the borderlines of gender are still maintained,” and among all the technological spheres, “hacking is a purely male domain, and in that sense a clearly gendered space” (Sollfrank 1999, 8). Moreover, she also suggested that from a cyberfeminist perspective, to deconstruct the pervasive power and trend of technology, the first has to be “combined with a gender-specific deconstruction of power, since technology is still, primarily, associated with maleness” (Sollfrank 1999, 8).
