= Graham Smith (Durham cricketer) =

English cricketer

Personal information
- Full name: John Graham David Smith
- Born: 21 August 1950; Stockton-on-Tees, County Durham, England
- Died: 12 October 2012 (aged 62)
- Batting: Right-handed
- Bowling: Left-arm medium

Domestic team information
- Years: Team
- 1982–1983: Durham

Career statistics
Competition	List A
Matches	1
Runs scored	3
Batting average	3.00
100s/50s	–/–
Top score	3
Balls bowled	72
Wickets	1
Bowling average	61.00
5 wickets in innings	–
10 wickets in match	–
Best bowling	1/61
Catches/stumpings	1/–
- Source: Cricinfo, 7 August 2011

John Graham David Smith (21 August 1950 – 12 October 2012) was an English cricketer. Smith was a right-handed batsman who bowled left-arm medium pace. He was born in Stockton-on-Tees, County Durham.

Smith made his debut for Durham against Northumberland in 1982 MCCA Knockout Trophy. He played Minor counties cricket for Durham in 1982 and 1983, making 6 Minor Counties Championship appearances. He made his only List A appearance against Surrey in the 1982 NatWest Trophy. He scored 3 runs in the match, before being dismissed by Kevin Mackintosh. Graham Smith died of cancer on Friday 12 October 2012.
