= Julianne Pierce =

Australian artist

- Occupations: New media artist and arts manager/creative producer

Julianne Pierce is an Australian new media artist, curator, art critic, writer, and arts manager/creative producer. She was a member of the groundbreaking group VNS Matrix. She went on to become a founding member of the Old Boys Network, another important cyberfeminist organisation.

She has served as executive director of the Australian Dance Theatre and was Chair of the Emerging and Experimental Arts Strategy Panel for the Australia Council. Pierce was executive director of the Australian Network for Art and Technology (ANAT) from 2000 to 2005, based in Adelaide, and was Executive Producer of Blast Theory from 2007 to 2012, based in Brighton in the UK.

Pierce has a long association with ISEA International as a contributor to the Symposium, member of the International Programming Committee and Chair of the ISEA International Board from 2001-2011.

She has worked with Adelaide Film Festival since 2022 as Manager and Lead Facilitator of AFF Expand Lab a collaborative development initiative where 30 Australian visual artists, video artists, filmmakers, writers, and XR and VR creatives come together to learn from each other, work with renowned mentors, and develop new moving image projects.

== On cyberfeminism ==
As documented in Hawthorne and Klein's 1999 book Cyberfeminism, VNS Matrix is often credited with inventing the term cyberfeminism and Pierce argues that the term emerged spontaneously in a number of places at once.

Julianne Pierce is a regular commentator on the early work of VNS Matrix and cyberfeminism new media art. "Cyberfeminism was about ideas, irony, appropriation and hands-on skilling up in the data terrain. It combined a utopic vision of corrupting patriarchy with an unbounded enthusiasm for the new tools of technology. It embraced gender and identity politics, allowing fluid and non-gendered identities to flourish through the digital medium. The post-corporeal female would be an online frontier woman, creating our own virtual worlds and colonising the amorphous world of cyberspace."

In 2022 Pierce wrote the foreword to the Cyberfeminism Index, edited by Mindy Seu. In Cyberfeminism Index, hackers, scholars, artists, and activists of all regions, races and sexual orientations consider how humans might reconstruct themselves by way of technology.

== Curated exhibitions and projects ==
- Future Languages (Adelaide Festival, 1994)
- Code Red (ANAT/Performance Space national tour, 1997)
- Biomachines (Adelaide Festival, 2000)
- Spectrascope (Biennale of Sydney, Performance Space, August 2000)
- Primavera 2003: Young Australian Artists (Museum of Contemporary Art, Sydney)
- Neoteric, Exhibition of contemporary South Australian artists (Adelaide Festival 2022)
