= Virginia Barratt =

Australian new media artist and activist

Virginia Barratt (born 1959) is an Australian researcher, artist, writer and performer. They completed a PhD at Western Sydney University in the Writing and Society Centre. Barratt's doctoral research focused on panic, affect and deterritorialization, explored through performance, experimental poetics and vocalities.

Born in the United Kingdom, from 1989 until 1991, Barratt worked as director of Australian Network for Art & Technology securing computers and software for artists at leading institutions and fostering discourse between scholars of art and technology. Barratt has said, "This kind of access was unprecedented, since computers were not personal and certainly not ubiquitous."

In 1990, Virginia Barratt attended the Second International Symposium on Electronic Art in Groningen, Netherlands along with other ANAT ambassadors.

Barratt was co-director of John Mills National with Adam Boyd. They are a founding member of the Queensland Artworkers Alliance, and a researcher for Sonic Research Initiative at York University.

They are a founding member of VNS Matrix, a collective of cyberfeminists collaborating from 1991 until about 1997. Barratt has said: "The VNS Matrix emerged from the cyberswamp during a southern Australian summer circa 1991, on a mission to hijack the toys from technocowboys and remap cyberculture with a feminist bent." VNS Matrix's multimedia project, A Cyberfeminist Manifesto for the 21st Century, became the first installment of Rhizome's online exhibition Net Art Anthology on 27 October 2016.

In the late 1980s, they began interacting with text-based virtual spaces, particularly on LambdaMOO utilizing avatars

They have contributed to, among others, Banquet Press, Overland, TEXT - a biannual electronic refereed journal, Writing from Below, Spheres Journal for Digital Cultures with Francesca da Rimini (aka doll yoko), Cordite, Plinth Journal, Artlink Journal, AXON Journal in collaboration with Quinn Eades, and Offshoot: Contemporary Lifewriting Methodologies and Practice in Australasia. Their most recent works have been performed in Adelaide, Brisbane, Melbourne, Byron Bay, Sydney, Helsingør, San Francisco, Toronto, London, Performing Arts Forum (PAF) and the Sorbonne in France, Humboldt University and Kunsthaus KuLe in Berlin. Barratt privileges co-creation as a productive and resistant modality. They collaborate in an ongoing capacity with Francesca da Rimini as In Her Interior.
