= Radhika Gajjala =

Indian communications and cultural studies academic

Radhika Gajjala (born December 22, 1960, in Bombay) is a communications and a cultural studies professor, who has been named a Fulbright scholar twice.

== Early life ==
Radhika Gajjala was born December 22, 1960, in Bombay (Mumbai), India. She then moved around with her family before attending college in Hyderabad, India, eventually settling down in Bowling Green, Ohio, in 1997.

== Career ==
Gajjala is a well known communications scholar, co-editor of Ada a journal focusing on gender, new media, and technology, and professor of both media and communication, and culture studies at Bowling Green State University. She has authored and co-authored several scholarly articles and books, with her most recent book being Cyberculture and the Subaltern: Weavings of the Virtual and Real.

== Education ==
In 1982, she attended Nizam's College, Osmania in Hyderabad, India, where she received her Bachelor of Arts in English literature, political science and economics. She then received her Masters in Corporate Communication from Duquesne University in Pittsburgh, Pennsylvania. After that she studied at the University of Pittsburgh and received her Ph.D. in media studies. Finally, she moved to Bowling Green, Ohio, where she started her career as a professor.

== Scholarly works ==
Gajjala’s main interests are digital media and how it affects globalization, gender, and race and technology. Gajjala also focuses on how these topics are affected and influenced by the digital world.

=== Books ===
- Gajjala, R. (2004). Cyber selves: Feminist Ethnographies of South Asian women. Walnut Creek: Altamira Press. [1,003,595 paid on Kindle; 1,031,555 in Books – Jan 23, 2011].
- Gajjala, R., & Gajjala, V. (Eds.). (2008). South-Asian Technospaces. New York: Peter Lang, Digital Formation Series.
- Blair, K., Gajjala, R., & Tulley, C. (Eds.). (2009). Webbing Cyberfeminist Practice: Communities, Pedagogies, and Social Action. New Jersey: Hampton Press.
- Chopra R. & Gajjala R., (Eds.). (2011) Global Media Cultures, and Identities. Routledge.
- Gajjala R. & Yeon Ju Oh (Eds.). (2012) Cyberfeminism 2.0. Peter Lang, Digital Formation Series edited by Steve Jones.
- Gajjala, R. (2012). Cyberculture and the Subaltern: Weavings of the Virtual and Real. Lexington Press.

=== Journal articles ===
- Gajjala, R (2015) When Your Seams Get Undone, Do You Learn to Sew or to Kill Monsters? The Communication Review.
- Zhang, Y., Gajjala, R., and Watkins, S. (2012). Home of Hope: Voicings, whiteness, and technological gaze. Journal of Communication Inquiry, 36(3), 202-221.
- Gajjala R and Birzescu A. (2011) Digital Imperialism through Online social/financial networks – for Special issue of Economic and Political Weekly (Edited by Rohit Chopra and Aniket Alam)
- Gajjala, R. (2011). Snapshots from sari Trails: Cyborgs Old and New, Social Identities, 17, 393-408.
- Gajjala, V., Gajjala, R., Birzescu, A., and Anarbaeva, S. (2011). Microfinance in Online Space: A Visual Analysis of Kiva.org. Development in Practice, 21, 880893.
- Gajjala, R., Zhang, Y., and Dako-Gyeke, P. (2010). Lexicons of Women’s Empowerment Online. Feminist Media Studies, Vol. 10(1): 69 -86.
- Gajjala, R. and Rybas, N. (2008). Racing and Queering the Interface: Producing global/local cyberselves. Qualitative Inquiry, Special Issue on Technology, 14, 1110-1133.
- Rybas, N., & Gajjala, R. (2007). Developing cyberethnographic research methods for understanding digitally mediated identities. Forum: Qualitative Social Research, 8(3).
- Gajjala, R. (2003). South Asian digital diasporas and cyberfeminist webs: negotiating globalization, nation, gender and information technology design. Contemporary South Asia, 12 (1), 41-56
- Gajjala, R., & Mamidipudi, A. (2002). Gendering processes within technological environments: A cyberfeminist issue. Rhizomes: Cultural Studies in Emerging Knowledge, 4. http://www.rhizomes.net
- Gajjala, R. (2000). Internet constructs of identity and ignorance: “Third-world” contexts and cyberfeminism. In G. Pagnucci & N. Mauriello (Eds.), (1999-2000). The future of narrative discourse: Internet constructs of literacy and identity: Vol. 17/18. Works and Days (pp. 33–36).
- Gajjala, R., & Mamidipudi, A. (1999). Cyberfeminism, technology and international “development.” Gender and Development, 17 (2), 8-16.

== Awards and honors ==
Gajjala is a two time Fulbright scholar. She was first awarded the scholarship in 2011 as a part of the general U.S. Scholars program at Soegijapranata Catholic University in Semarang, Indonesia. While there she taught classes, conducted workshops on gender, globalization and digital media, and did field research with gamers and youth cultures. She was then awarded the scholarship again in 2015 as part of the Core Fulbright U.S. Scholar Program specializing in communication at the University of Bergen in Bergen, Norway. Her project in Norway was titled Rupturing Digital Fabrics, Unpacking Global and Local Hierarchies: Developing Method for Postcolonial Digital Humanities.

== See also ==
- Cyberfeminism
