= Josephine Starrs =

Australian artist

- Born: 1955 (age 70–71)
- Education: South Australian School of Arts
- Occupation: artist
- Style: video and new media
- Website: http://josephinestarrs.com

Josephine Starrs (born 1955) is an Australian artist who creates socially engaged art focusing on human relationships to new technologies, nature and climate change. Her video and new media work has been exhibited in Australia and at international art exhibitions. She was a Senior Lecturer in Media Arts at Sydney College of the Arts, University of Sydney until 2016.

== Background and education ==
Starrs grew up in Adelaide, South Australia and was educated at the South Australian School of Arts. She has worked in a variety of mediums including photography, animation, video, and new media.

She is a founding member of the cyberfeminist group VNS Matrix. In the early 1990s the group explored the role of women in technology and art, contributing to the development of Cyberfeminism.

== Collaboration with Leon Cmielewski ==
Starrs has collaborated with artist Leon Cmielewski since 1994 when they were living together in New York. Their collaborative work focuses on incorporating interactivity and play while engaging with contemporary social issues. Their works have appeared in forms such as kiosks, games, card games, dances, films, and mapping installations.

In 1999, Starrs worked with Leon Cmielewski to develop a game mod titled “Bio-Tek Kitchen”, based on the first-person shooter game Marathon Infinity. Bio-tek Kitchen was part of the art exhibition Cracking the Maze, curated by Anne-marie Schleiner. In an interview with online magazine Gamescenes, Starrs said ″Digital gaming has become as much of a cultural force in our world as cinema. In the same way that experimental film and video has grown alongside the mainstream film industry, game art has emerged in the past two decades, often drawing on digital game concepts, formats and narrative structure.″

== Selected works ==
The works below are in collaboration with Leon Cmielewski unless otherwise noted.

- User Unfriendly Interface (1996), first shown at Performance Space, Sydney.
- Fuzzy Love Dating Database (1997), first exhibited at the Künstlerhaus Bethanien in Berlin.
- Dream Kitchen (2000)
- Trace (2002), commissioned and exhibited by State Records Centre, Sydney.
- Floating Territories (2004), which took place in the form of swipe cards as boarding passes for a ferry that traveled between Helsinki, Finland, Stockholm, Sweden, and Tallinn, Estonia. Travellers were assigned tribal allegiances that each had different goals in the game based on locations on the ferry.
- Seeker (2006), which was a map-based game that allowed viewers to track their family migration history and view statistics about natural resources, migration flows, human population, and economics in a visual format. Seeker won an Award of Distinction at the Ars Electronica festival in Linz, Austria in 2007.
- sms_origins (2009), displayed at Federation Square in Melbourne, Australia. sms_origins was an adaptation of Seeker for mobile phones.
- Downstream (2009), exhibited by Novamedia at the "Impact by Degrees" exhibition in Washington, D.C. This work included a large print work called And The River Was Dust, based on text from the poem South of my Days by Australian poet Judith Wright.
- Incompatible Elements (2010), exhibited at Performance Space Carriageworks, Sydney.
- Dancing with Drones (2015), in collaboration with dancer Alison Plevey in the form of a film of a dance competition between a human dancer and a remotely operated drone.
- and the earth sighed (2016), featured in Performing Climates, Arts House, Melbourne video documentation.
