= Cyberfeminism Index =

Collection of resources

The Cyberfeminism Index is an index of subjects related to Cyberfeminism by Mindy Seu. In 2019, it began as a Google Sheet that was then transposed onto a website. The index was published as a book in 2023.
