= Graham Smith (Leicestershire cricketer) =

English cricketer

Personal information
- Full name: Graham Stuart Smith
- Born: 4 July 1923; Leicester, Leicestershire, England
- Died: 3 April 1997 (aged 73); Cosby, Leicestershire, England
- Batting: Right-handed

Domestic team information
- Years: Team
- 1949: Leicestershire

Career statistics
Competition	First-class
Matches	1
Runs scored	29
Batting average	14.50
100s/50s	–/–
Top score	22
Balls bowled	–
Wickets	–
Bowling average	–
5 wickets in innings	–
10 wickets in match	–
Best bowling	–
Catches/stumpings	–/–
- Source: Cricinfo, 29 February 2012

Graham Stuart Smith (4 July 1923 – 3 April 1997) was an English cricketer. Smith was a right-handed batsman. He was born at Leicester, Leicestershire.

Smith made a single first-class appearance for Leicestershire against Northamptonshire at the County Cricket Ground, Northampton, in the 1949 County Championship. Northamptonshire won the toss and elected to bat, scoring 239 runs in their first-innings. In response, Leicestershire made 264 runs in their first-innings, with Smith scoring 22 runs in it, before being dismissed by Gordon Brice. Northamptonshire had an improved batting display in their second-innings, declaring on 350/5. This left Leicestershire with a target of 326 for victory, in their second-innings chase they made 271/7 before the match was declared a draw. Smith scored 7 runs in this innings, before being dismissed by Bill Barron. This was his only major appearance for Leicestershire.

He died at Cosby, Leicestershire, on 3 April 1997.
