= Graeme N. Smith =

Canadian obstetrician (born 1963)

- Born: 1963 (age 62–63)
- Spouse: Susan Chamberlain
- Children: 2

Academic background
- Education: M.D., PhD., 1992, University of Western Ontario; FRCSC, Queen's University; University of Toronto
- Thesis: Effects of maternal ethanol infusion on the near-term ovine fetus.
- Doctoral advisor: John Patrick

Academic work
- Discipline: Obstetrics and Gynaecology
- Institutions: Queen's University
- Main interests: Maternal–fetal medicine

Graeme Neil Smith (born 1963) is a Canadian obstetrician. He is the former Head of the Department of Obstetrics and Gynaecology in the Faculty of Health Sciences at Queen's University and clinician-scientist at Kingston General Hospital Research Institute.

== Early life and education ==
Smith was born in 1963. He earned his medical degree and PhD from the University of Western Ontario and earned his Royal College of Surgeons of Canada certification at Queen's University.

== Career ==
After completing sub-specialty training in Maternal-Fetal Medicine at the University of Toronto in 1999, Smith joined the faculty of Obstetrics and Gynecology at Queen's University. In 2003, he received the Premier's Research Excellence Award.

In 2011, Smith began the MotHERS Program (Mothers Health Education, Research and Screening) at Kingston General Hospital. His research team developed an app called "Maternelle" which allowed mothers and their family doctor to track their patients health during pregnancy. Two years later, Smith was appointed Head of the Department of Obstetrics and Gynaecology in the Faculty of Health Sciences at Queen's University.

By 2016, his team received a $9.8 million grant from the Canadian Institutes of Health Research to continue their research into maternal and child health. He was later reappointed Head of the Department of Obstetrics and Gynaecology in the Faculty of Health Sciences at Queen's University for another five-year term.

== Personal life ==
Smith is married to obstetrician/gynaecologist Susan Chamberlain and together they have two children.
