= Kevin Mackintosh =

English cricketer (born 1957)

Kevin Scott Mackintosh (born 30 August 1957 in Surbiton) is a retired English first-class cricketer, active 1978–83, who played for Nottinghamshire and Surrey.
