= A Cyborg Manifesto =

1985 essay by Donna Haraway

"A Cyborg Manifesto" is an essay written by Donna Haraway and first published in 1985 in the Socialist Review under the title "A Manifesto for Cyborgs: Science, Technology, and Socialist Feminism in the 1980s." In it, the concept of the cyborg represents a rejection of rigid boundaries, notably those separating "human" from "animal" and "human" from "machine." Haraway writes: "The cyborg does not dream of community on the model of the organic family, this time without the oedipal project. The cyborg would not recognize the Garden of Eden; it is not made of mud and cannot dream of returning to dust."

The "Manifesto" challenges traditional notions of feminism, particularly feminism that focuses on identity politics, and instead encourages coalition through affinity. Haraway uses the concept of a cyborg to represent the plasticity of identity and to highlight the limitations of socially imposed identities; the "Manifesto" is considered a major milestone in the development of feminist posthumanist theory.

Given its composition in the mid-1980s, the "Manifesto" also includes many references to the political context of the period, including the geopolitical tensions of the late Cold War, the anti-nuclear protests of the Livermore Action Group, the "Star Wars" missile defense initiative, and the rise of the New Right in the United States.

== Summary ==
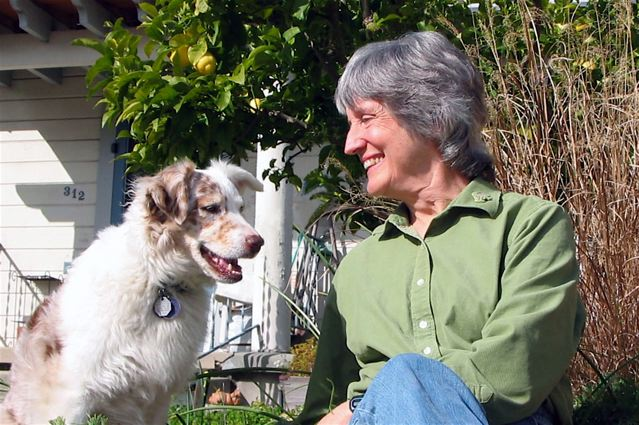
Haraway, the author, in 2006

Haraway begins the "Manifesto" by explaining three boundary breakdowns since the 20th century that have allowed for her hybrid, cyborg myth: those between human and animal, animal-human and machine, and physical and non-physical. Evolution, she claims, has blurred the lines between human and animal; 20th-century machines have blurred the lines between natural and artificial; and microelectronics and the political invisibility of cyborgs have blurred the lines of physicality.

Haraway's piece is a novel approach to examining the culture-nature divide. She introduces the potential of a completely new ontology of hybridization of nature and culture through the cyborg, a combination of machine and organism. Haraway's use of the cyborg illustrates her conceptualizations of socialism and feminism in the examinations of dichotomies such as nature/culture, mind/body, and idealism/materialism. Haraway's cyborgs are a blending of imagination and material reality. The cyborg is a dualism, as opposed to a dichotomy; there is value perceived in the confusion of the borders of bounded categories. The need for the divide between culture and nature is no longer relevant, and the cyborg emerges from the blending of that boundary.

=== Issues with Western patriarchal tenets ===
Haraway highlights what she sees as the problematic use and justification of historical Western ideologies like patriarchy, colonialism, essentialism, and naturalism (among others). These traditions in turn allow for the problematic formations of taxonomies (and identifications of the Other) and what Haraway explains as "antagonistic dualisms" that order Western discourse. These dualisms, Haraway states, "have all been systematic to the logics and practices of domination of women, people of color, nature, workers, animals... all [those] constituted as others." She highlights specific problematic dualisms of "self/other,[...] culture/nature, male/female, civilized/primitive,[...] right/wrong, truth/illusion, total/partial, God/man [among others]". She explains that these dualisms are in competition with one another, creating paradoxical relations of domination (especially between the One and the Other). However, high-tech culture provides a challenge to these antagonistic dualisms.

There is also the idea that cyborgs are beings that have been uncoupled from organic reproduction. Haraway also distinguishes the cyborg from other literary ideas that are lacking in their parentage such as Frankenstein's monster, because that parentage is no longer a relevant or desired connection. Haraway paints the cyborg as the illegitimate offspring of patriarchal capitalism; because that connection isn't sought or is irrelevant, the cyborg is not beholden to its capitalistic, patriarchal, and neoliberal origins. There are social and bodily realities that come about from the joint kinship with both organisms and machines that inform on the identities of cyborgs to be permanently partial identities, incorporating aspects of both. The struggle is to see from both perspectives at once, and can provide an archetype for resistance, as another of Haraway's premises is about the need for unity of people in the face of what she refers to as "world wide intensification of domination."

=== Cyborg theory ===
Haraway's cyborg theory rejects the notions of essentialism, proposing instead a chimeric, monstrous world of fusions between animal and machine. Cyborg theory relies on writing as "the technology of cyborgs," and asserts that "cyborg politics is the struggle for language and the struggle against perfect communication, against the one code that translates all meaning perfectly, the central dogma of phallogocentrism." Instead, Haraway's cyborg calls for a non-essentialized, material-semiotic metaphor capable of uniting diffuse political coalitions along the lines of affinity rather than identity. Following Lacanian feminists such as Luce Irigaray, Haraway addresses the chasm between feminist discourses and the dominant language of Western patriarchy. As Haraway explains, "grammar is politics by other means," and effective politics require speaking in the language of domination. Still, as Haraway states, "Feminist cyborg stories have the task of recoding communication and intelligence to subvert command and control." These stories are "communications devices" which "can suggest a way out of the maze of dualisms in which we have explained our bodies," dualisms which engender the illusion of perfect coded communication. Haraway mentions Octavia Butler, John Varley, and Vonda McIntyre as authors/artists whose works constitute a feminist science fiction of cyborg stories.

As she details in a chart of the paradigmatic shifts from modern to postmodern epistemology within the Manifesto, the unified human subject of identity has shifted to the hybridized posthuman of technoscience, from "representation" to "simulation", "bourgeois novel" to "science fiction", "reproduction" to "replication", and "white capitalist patriarchy" to "informatics of domination". While Haraway's "ironic dream of a common language" is inspired by Irigaray's argument for a discourse other than patriarchy, she rejects Irigaray's essentializing construction of woman-as-not-male to argue for a linguistic community of situated, partial knowledges in which no one is innocent.

In her discussion of cyborg theory, Haraway describes two possible worlds resulting from embracing cyborg identity. The first future, which aligns with the view point taken by socialist and radical feminism, is that the breaking down of the boundary between the organism and technology will represent the final conquering of the oppressed body. The second future, which Haraway offers as an alternative in her critique of binary thinking, allows for kinship between boundaries and acceptance of fluid and contradictory identities. These futures function within her argument for cyborg theory in that she sees the acknowledgment of both possibilities as necessary for understanding intersecting forces of oppression and preparing for how technological advancement will change the ways that political forces as well as identity and kinship will function in the future.

=== Criticism of traditional feminism ===
Haraway takes issue with some traditional feminists, reflected in statements describing how "women more than men somehow sustain daily life, and so have a privileged epistemological (relating to the theory of knowledge) position potentially." The views of traditional feminism operate under the totalizing assumptions that all men are one way, and women another, whereas "a cyborg theory of wholes and parts," does not desire to explain things in total theory. Haraway suggests that feminists should move beyond naturalism and essentialism, criticizing feminist tactics as "identity politics" that victimize those excluded, and she proposes that it is better strategically to confuse identities. Her criticism mainly focuses on socialist and radical feminism. The former, she writes, achieves "to expand the category of labour to what (some) women did". Socialist feminism does not naturalize but rather builds a unity that was non-existent before - namely the woman worker. On the other hand, radical feminism, according to Catharine MacKinnon, describes a world in which the woman only exists in opposition to the man. The concept of woman is socially constructed within the patriarchal structure of society and women only exist because men have made them exist. The woman as a self does not exist. Haraway criticizes both when writing that "my complaint about socialist/Marxian standpoints is their unintended erasure of polyvocal, unassimilable, radical difference made visible in anti-colonial discourse and practice" and "MacKinnon's intentional erasure of all difference through the device of the 'essential' non-existence of women is not reassuring" (299).

Haraway also indirectly critiques white feminism by highlighting the struggles of women of color: she suggests that a woman of color "might be understood as a cyborg identity, a potent subjectivity synthesized from fusions of outsider identities and in the complex political-historical layerings of her 'biomythography.'"

To counteract the essentializing and anachronistic rhetoric of spiritual and cultural ecofeminists, who were fighting patriarchy with modernist constructions of female-as-nature and earth mothers, Haraway employs the cyborg to refigure feminism into cybernetic code.

=== Call to action ===
Haraway calls for a revision of the concept of gender, moving away from Western patriarchal essentialism and toward "the utopian dream of the hope for a monstrous world without gender," stating that "Cyborgs might consider more seriously the partial, fluid, sometimes aspect of sex and sexual embodiment. Gender might not be global identity after all, even if it has profound historical breadth and depth."

Haraway also calls for a reconstruction of identity, no longer dictated by naturalism and taxonomy but instead by affinity, wherein individuals can construct their own groups by choice. In this way, groups may construct a "post-modernist identity out of otherness, difference, and specificity" as a way to counter Western traditions of exclusive identification.

== Publication history ==
Haraway began writing the "Manifesto" in 1983 to address the Socialist Review request for American socialist feminists to ponder over the future of socialist feminism in the context of the early Reagan era and the decline of leftist politics. The first versions of the essay had a strong socialist and European connection that the Socialist Review East Coast Collective found too controversial to publish. The Berkeley Socialist Review Collective published the essay in 1985 under the editor Jeff Escoffier. The essay was most widely read as part of Haraway's 1991 book Simians, Cyborgs and Women. In 2006, a variorum edition of the Manifesto was published in The International Handbook of Virtual Learning Environments integrating variations from the various versions and returning references and some of the scholarly apparatus that had become separated from the text.

== Updates and revisions ==
Although Haraway's metaphor of the cyborg has been labelled as a post-gender statement, Haraway has clarified her stance on post-genderism in some interviews. She acknowledges that her argument in the "Manifesto" seeks to challenge the necessity for categorization of gender, but does not correlate this argument to post-genderism. She clarifies this distinction because post-genderism is often associated with the discourse of the utopian concept of being beyond masculinity and femininity. Haraway notes that gender constructs are still prevalent and meaningful, but are troublesome and should therefore be eliminated as categories for identity.

== Applications of The Cyborg ==
Although Haraway intended her concept of the cyborg to be a feminist critique, she acknowledges that other scholars and popular media have taken her concept and applied it to different contexts. Haraway is aware and receptive of the different uses of her concept of the cyborg, but admits "very few people are taking what I consider all of its parts". Wired Magazine overlooked the feminist theory of the cyborg and instead used it to make a more literal commentary about the enmeshment of humans and technology. Despite this, Haraway also recognizes that new feminist scholars "embrace and use the cyborg of the manifesto to do what they want for their own purposes".

=== Patchwork Girl ===
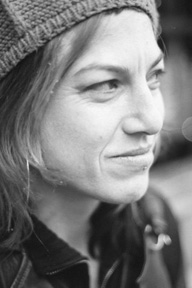
Shelley Jackson, author of Patchwork Girl

Patchwork Girl, a hypertext work, makes use of elements from "A Cyborg Manifesto". Patchwork Girl's "thematic focus on the connections between monstrosity, subjectivity, and new reproductive technologies is apparent from its very first page, when readers, or users, open the hypertext to find a picture of a scarred and naked female body sewn together with a single dotted line...Readers enter the text by clicking on this body and following its 'limbs' or links to different sections of the text." In Jackson's narrative, the Patchwork Girl is an aborted female monster created by Victor Frankenstein of Mary Shelley's 1818 novel Frankenstein, or The Modern Prometheus, an abhorrent and monstrous creature that is "part male, part female, part animal, 175 years old, and 'razed' up through hypertext technology." The monster, following her destruction by Victor, is sewn back together by Mary Shelley herself, while simultaneously becoming Mary's lover; she is thus, "a cyborg who is queer, dis-proportioned, and visibly scarred. She both facilitates and undermines preoccupations with the benefits and dangers of reproductive technologies by embracing all of the monstrosities that reproductive/fetal screenings are imagined to 'catch' and one day prevent." The Patchwork Girl embraces Haraway's conception of a cybernetic posthuman being in both her physical multiplicity and her challenge towards "the images and fantasies sustaining reproductive politics."

=== "Cyborg Goddesses" ===
Turkish critical scholar Leman Giresunlu uses Haraway's cyborg as framework to examine current science fiction movies such as Lara Croft: Tomb Raider and Resident Evil in her essay "Cyborg Goddesses: The Mainframe Revisited". In this essay, she explores how her new concept of the cyborg goddess, a female figure "capable of inflicting pain and pleasure simultaneously", can be used to make sense of how female representation is shifting towards a more multidimensional stance. Giresunlu builds from Haraway's cyborg because the cyborg goddess goes beyond "offering a way out from [the] duality" and instead provides how spirituality and technology work together to form a complex and more accurate representation of women.

=== "Mind Over Matter" ===
In her essay "Mind Over Matter: Mental Evolution and Physical Devolution in The Incredible Shrinking Man", American critical scholar Ruthellen Cunnally uses Haraway's cyborg to help make sense of how Robert Scott Carey, the protagonist of The Incredible Shrinking Man, transforms into a cyborg in the midst of a metaphor of cold war politics in his home. As Robert continues to shrink, the gendered power dynamic between him and his wife Louise shifts from "the realm of husband/wife into the mode of mother/son". When Robert finds himself lost in the feminine space of the basement, an area of the house that was reserved for Louise's domestic duties of sewing and washing, he is forced to fight for his life and reclaim his masculinity. Although he is able to conquer some of his foes and regain his "manhood", the gender lines do not become established again because there is no one to share and implement the gendered power structure with. Robert's transformation presents "an existence in which acceptance and meaning are released from the limitations of patriarchal dualisms", which aligns with Haraway's cyborg.

== Criticism ==
Traditional feminists have criticized "A Cyborg Manifesto" as anti-feminist because it denies any commonalities of the female experience. In the "Manifesto", Haraway writes "there is nothing about being 'female' that naturally binds women", which goes against a defining characteristic of traditional feminism that calls women to join in order to advocate for members of their gender.

Criticism and controversy surrounded the essay's publication history: the East Coast Collective of the Socialist Review found the piece "a naive embrace of technology" and advocated against its publication, while The Berkeley Collective ultimately insisted that it go to print. The essay has been described as "controversial" and "viral" in its circulation through multiple academic departments and disciplinary boundaries, contributing to the critical discourse on its claims.

This controversiality was matched by its omnipresence; Jackie Orr, Associate Professor of Sociology at the Maxwell School of Citizenship and Public Affairs Syracuse University, writes, "It is hard to be a feminist graduate student in the U.S. humanities or social sciences after 1985 and not be touched in some way by the Cyborg Manifesto." The rapid adoption of the article in academic circles also increased the pace of the critical conversation surrounding the work, and in 1990, Haraway felt that the essay had "acquired a surprise half life," which made it "impossible to rewrite" and necessitated revisiting the topic in her subsequent publications.

Many critiques of "A Cyborg Manifesto" focus on a basic level of reader comprehension and writing style, such as Orr's observation that "undergraduate students in a science and technology class find the Cyborg Manifesto curiously relevant but somewhat impenetrable to read." This is corroborated by Helen Merrick and Margret Grebowicz's observation that scientists who reviewed Primate Visions had similar issues, particularly as related to Haraway's use of irony. Judy Wajcman, Professor of Sociology at the London School of Economics and Political Science, suggests in TechnoFeminism that "the openness of her writing to a variety of readings is intentional," which "can sometimes make Haraway difficult to interpret;" however, it does not seem that Wajcman critiques Haraway's tone for its capability to encompass more possibilities, rather than limit them. Wajcman concludes her chapter "Send in the Cyborgs" on a critical note, claiming that "Certainly, Haraway is much stronger at providing evocative figurations of a new feminist subjectivity than she is at providing guidelines for a practical emancipatory politics."

Critiques of Haraway have also centered on the accessibility of the thematic topics she discusses in her writing, and according to third-wave feminist readings, her work "assumes a reader who is familiar with North American culture," and posits that "readers without the appropriate cultural capital are...likely to find it infuriatingly obscure and impenetrable." Therefore, Haraway's symbolism is representative of North American culture symbolizing a "non-universalizing vision for feminist strategies" and "has been taken up within cyberfeminism as the symbol of an essential female being." Considering the question of accessibility more broadly, disability studies have focused on Haraway's essay, noting the absence of "any kind of critical engagement with disability...disabled bodies are simply presented as exemplary...requiring neither analysis nor critique"—a gap which Alison Kafer, Professor of Feminist Studies at Southwestern University, attempts to address in Feminist, Queer, Crip. Wajcman also argues that Haraway's view of technology in "A Cyborg Manifesto" is perhaps too totalizing, and that the binary of "the cyborg solution and the goddess solution" ultimately "caricatures feminism" by focusing too readily on a dichotomy that may in fact be a false one.

In Unfinished Work-From Cyborg to Cognisphere, N. Katherine Hayles questions the validity of cyborg as a unit of analysis. She says that because of the complicated situation of technology and media, "cyborg is no longer the individual person – or for that matter, the individual cyborg – is no longer the appropriate unit of analysis, if indeed it ever was."

As for the relationships between cyborg and religion, Robert A. Campbell argues that "in spite of Haraway's efforts to move beyond traditional Western dualisms and offer a new hope for women, and by extension of humanity and the world, what she in fact offers is a further legitimation for buying into the not so new American civil religion of high technology." He says that "in spite of what some may view as a radical critique of the present and a potentially frightening prescription for the future, the stark reality about Haraway's 'postmodern reality' is that there is no such thing."

Beyond its presence in academic context, "A Cyborg Manifesto" has also had popular traction including Wired's piece by Hari Kunzru and Mute, BuzzFeed, as well as Vice. Retrospective articles consistently mark its anniversary.

In 2018, disability rights activist Jillian Weise, who identifies as a cyborg, argued that the "Cyborg Manifesto" erased disabled people and appropriated the aesthetic of disability.

=== The sonographic fetus as cyborg ===
Scholar Marilyn Maness Mehaffy writes that the "sonographic fetus is in many ways the ultimate cyborg in that it is 'created' in a space of virtuality that straddles the conventional boundary between an organic body and a digital text." Yet, it is this cyborg that presents a limit to Haraway's post-human theory. The sonographic fetus, as posited by scholar Heather Latimer, "is publicly envisioned as both independent of [its mother's] body and as independent of the sonographic equipment used to read this body. We know that fetal images are depictions, yet the sonogram invokes a documentary-like access to fetuses that makes it easy to ignore this, which in turn can limit the authority and agency of pregnant women." In positioning the fetus as independent, and consequently oppositional, to the pregnant mother, these reproductive technologies "reinscribe stable meanings to the human/machine dualism they supposedly disrupt." Valerie Hartouni argues, "most reproductive technologies have assimilated into the 'order of nature'" which would make Haraway's vision of a regenerative species, unrestricted by heteronormative conceptions of reproduction, unattainable in the sonographic fetus.

== See also ==
- Antinaturalism
- Cyberfeminism
- Posthumanism
- The Empire Strikes Back: A Posttranssexual Manifesto
