= Graham M. Smith =

- Born: 1974 (age 51–52)

Education
- Education: Lancaster University (PhD)
- Thesis: The fate of 'friendship' in political modernity : being-with-others in the thought of Kierkegaard and Nietzsche (2003)

Philosophical work
- Institutions: University of Leeds, Lancaster University
- Main interests: political theory, friendship, continental political thought, Anglo-American political thought, the subject

Graham M. Smith (born 1974) is a British political theorist and Associate Professor in Political Theory at the University of Leeds. Smith is known for his research on friendship and its relation to the understanding of the political. He previously taught at Lancaster University and is the co-editor of the online, peer-reviewed, open-access journal AMITY: The Journal of Friendship Studies.

== Works ==
- Confronting Secularism in Europe and India: Legitimacy and Disenchantment in Contemporary Times (co-edited with Brian Black and Gavin Hyman), Bloomsbury (2014).
- Friendship and the Political: Kierkegaard, Nietzsche, Schmitt, Imprint Academic, (2011).
- Friendship in Politics: Theorizing Amity In and Between States (ed. with Preston King), Routledge, (2008).
- ‘Friendship, State and Nation’ in Friendship and International Relations, eds. Koschut, S. and Oelsner, A. (2014)
- ‘Kierkegaard, Søren’ in Encyclopaedia of Political Theory, ed. Bevir, Mark, Sage, (2010).
