= Evelin Stermitz =

Austrian artist

- Born: 1972 (age 53–54); Austria
- Education: Study of Pedagogics and Media Communication (1996 – 1999), University of Klagenfurt, Austria, MA study of Photography and Video and new media (2004 – 2007), Academy of Fine Arts and Design, University of Ljubljana, Slovenia
- Known for: Photography, Video art, Internet art
- Movement: Internet art, Video art

Evelin Stermitz (born 1972) is an Austrian artist working in the areas of video art, new media art, performance, and photography, who is also foundress of the ArtFem.TV project.

Stermitz is a member of DLUL Društvo likovnih umetnikov Ljubljana (Association of Fine Artists Ljubljana, Ljubljana, Slovenia), FACES: gender, technology, art, and Gesellschaft Bildender Künstlerinnen und Künstler Österreichs, Künstlerhaus Wien (The Association of Austrian Artists, Künstlerhaus Vienna, Vienna, Austria).

Stermitz participated in the international video collages of FemLink-Art- The International Video-Artists Collective, and in the project 100x100=900 (100 video artists to tell a century) curated by Enrico Tomaselli. Stermitz created the feminist net art work “World of Female Avatars” in the year 2006 as an ongoing project of cyberfeminism. World of Female Avatars is a project for expanded understanding of women and their relation to their body. By using the Internet as an artistic survey media as many different entries from different cultures as possible are collected. The public call for female body pictures and text with personal statements about the body are presented at this net art project. The submitted pictures and text are used for a digital collage to create new bodies, which live in the cyber World of Female Avatars.

== Biography ==
=== Background and early life ===
Stermitz majored in the study of Pedagogics and Media Communication (1996 – 1999) at the University Klagenfurt, Austria, where she completed her master’s degree in Philosophy on the thesis “Imagoes of Dancing Women in Film” in the year 1999. Stermitz received a scholarship for the postgraduate study of Visual Communication at the Academy of Fine Arts and Design, University of Ljubljana, Slovenia, (Prof. Milan Pajk – photography, Prof. Srečo Dragan – video and new media) in the year 2004. She graduated with a Master of Arts degree on the thesis “The Female Body in Context of Media Art” in the year 2007.

== ArtFem.TV ==
Stermitz established ArtFem.TV in 2008 to promote the artistic works and projects of women artists on an international online video portal.

The website features more than 500 videos dating back to early video art from the 1970s, and also includes current pieces from over 100 women artists.
