= Old Boys Network =

First international Cyberfeminist alliance

The Old Boys Network was the first international Cyberfeminist alliance. It was founded in 1997 in Berlin and remained active until 2001.

The group was founded by Susanne Ackers, Julianne Pierce, Valentina Djordjevic, Ellen Nonnenmacher and Cornelia Sollfrank in the spring of 1997. They organised the First Cyberfeminist International in September of that year as part of the Documenta X art event. OBN's philosophy was to keep the term "cyberfeminism" as open as possible, allowing for diverse and interdisciplinary approaches and they were an open network. They emphasized the importance of disagreement and debate within the movement.

The group made three international conferences. After the second international conference held in Rotterdam in 1999, the organizational structure shifted again and replaced the “core group and network” model to an association of different working groups. In the five years OBN was active, three international conferences were organized in different constellations.

"The Truth about Cyberfeminism" was a performance held at Die Höge, Högenhausen from October 22-24, 2000, as part of the international symposium "Dialoge und Debatten" on feminist positions in contemporary visual arts. This event brought together various artists and theorists to explore and debate the intersections of feminism and digital culture. The symposium aimed to foster critical discussions and showcase innovative feminist art practices.

In her essay, Cornelia Sollfrank explores the internal organizational dynamics and the micropolitical currents that shaped OBN, emphasizing the entanglement of art and politics, not just as a platform for organizing existing contexts but played a crucial role in creating new fields and imaginaries. The group was brought together by the concept of "organizational aesthetics," where the process of getting organized and building relations is seen as an artistic and political practice. The network was brought together by the micropolitics: the spirit, the vibes and affects and not a consensus in macro-political topics.

The creation of the OBN archive is a dynamic repository of cyberfeminist activities. This archive preserves not just digital artifacts but also the relational and contextual aspects of OBN's work.

The twentieth anniversary of the First Cyberfeminist International was marked by the Institute of Contemporary Art, London with a five-day event called the Post-Cyber Feminist International.

== Prior events ==
- First Cyberfeminist International Conference was part of Documenta X and took place in Kassel, 20-28 Sep 1997. It was organized by Old Boys Network.
- OBN@IFA, Stuttgart, 26 Nov 1997 Presentation at the Institute for Foreign Cultural Relations (IFA) in Stuttgart.
- OBN@ZKM, Karlsruhe, 20 Feb 1998 Presentation at the Center for Art and Media (ZKM) in Karlsruhe, exploring cyberfeminist practices and digital culture.
- OBN@V2, Rotterdam, 15 May 1998 Presentation at the V2_ Institute for the Unstable Media in Rotterdam, discussing the impact of cyberfeminism on contemporary media.
- OBN@KUNSTHALLE, Vienna, 10 Sep 1998 Presentation at the Kunsthalle Wien, examining the role of cyberfeminism in the art world.
- OBN@MUSEUM LUDWIG, Cologne, 5 Nov 1998 Presentation at the Museum Ludwig in Cologne, focusing on the integration of cyberfeminist ideas in museum practices.
- OBN@DEAF, Rotterdam, 18 Nov 1998 Presentation at the Dutch Electronic Art Festival (DEAF) in Rotterdam, highlighting the contributions of cyberfeminism to electronic art.
- Next Cyberfeminist International Conference took place in Rotterdam, 8-13 Mar 1999.
- OBN@ZKM, performance, ZKM, Karlsruhe, 16 Oct 1999. Performative contribution to the net_condition exhibition.
- OBN@IFU, presentation, University of Hamburg, 24 Aug 2000.
- Very Cyberfeminist International conference, Lichtmess-Kino, Hamburg, 13-16 Dec 2001.
