= VNS Matrix =

Australian cyberfeminist art collective

VNS Matrix was an artist collective founded in Adelaide, Australia, in 1991, by Josephine Starrs, Julianne Pierce, Francesca da Rimini and Virginia Barratt. Their work included installations, events, and posters distributed through the Internet, magazines, and billboards. Taking their point of departure in a sexualised and socially provocative relationship between women and technology the works subversively questioned discourses of domination and control in the expanding cyber space. They are credited as being amongst the first artists to use the term cyberfeminism to describe their practice; according to artist Anna Couey they outright coined the term along with Sadie Plant. Their first use of the term cyberfeminist was in 1991.

== Overview ==
VNS Matrix was an Australian feminist artist group who were active from 1991 to 1997. Their activist practice was concerned primarily with women's role in technology and art, specifically taking issue with "the gendered dominance and control of the new technologies" and exploring, "the construction of social space, identity and sexuality in cyberspace"

One of their first works was a 6 by 18 foot billboard announcing "the clitoris is a direct line to the matrix...". In 1991, they wrote their "A Cyberfeminist Manifesto for the 21st Century." Though the manifesto was designed for the Internet—reposted to various websites—it also piratically circulated through traditional media, including radio broadcast, television, posted in public spaces and placed in the printed advertisements of magazines.

In 1993 VNS Matrix debuted their computer art game/installation All New Gen at the Experimental Art Foundation Gallery in Adelaide which received national interest, critical acclaim, and wildly enthusiastic reviews.

Welcome to the world of ALL NEW GEN: the radically transgressive, interactive computer game for non-specific genders. Thank you for playing. You are invited to join All New Gen and her DNA Sluts—the super powerful Patina de Panties, Dentata, and the Princess of Slime—in their battle against Big Daddy Mainframe and his technobimbo sidekicks—Circuit Boy, Streetfighter and other total dicks—whom you will encounter in the Contested Zone. This is a zone where gender is a shufflable six-letter word and power is no longer centered in a specific organization."

After logging on to All New Gen, the first question asked of game players is: 'What is your gender? Male, Female, Neither.' 'Neither' is the correct answer, since clicking the Male or Female icon sends players spinning on a loop that takes them out of the game. In 1994 All New Gen was well received at the International Symposium on Electronic Art in Helsinki after which it toured to a number of galleries and art spaces in Australia, Europe, the United States, Canada and Japan. VNS Matrix was later awarded a grant from the Australian Film Commission to develop a prototype of an All Gen CD-ROM game for international distribution called Bad Code, which included a number of enhancements including sophisticated new images, 3D graphic spaces, animations, video sequences, characters and zones.

In 2019, VNS Matrix participated in the group show Producing Futures: An Exhibition on Post-Cyberfeminism at the Migros Museum für Gegenwartskunst in Zurich, Switzerland.

== See also ==
- Art manifesto
- Cyberfeminism
- Australian Feminist Art Timeline
