= Graham Smith (artist) =

Graham Smith is an artist, inventor and educator based in Germany, Canada and the Netherlands He has exhibited for the last 25 years.

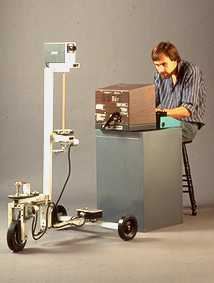
Early Telepresence Robot

== Early life ==
Smith was born in Vancouver, British Columbia.

== Projects ==
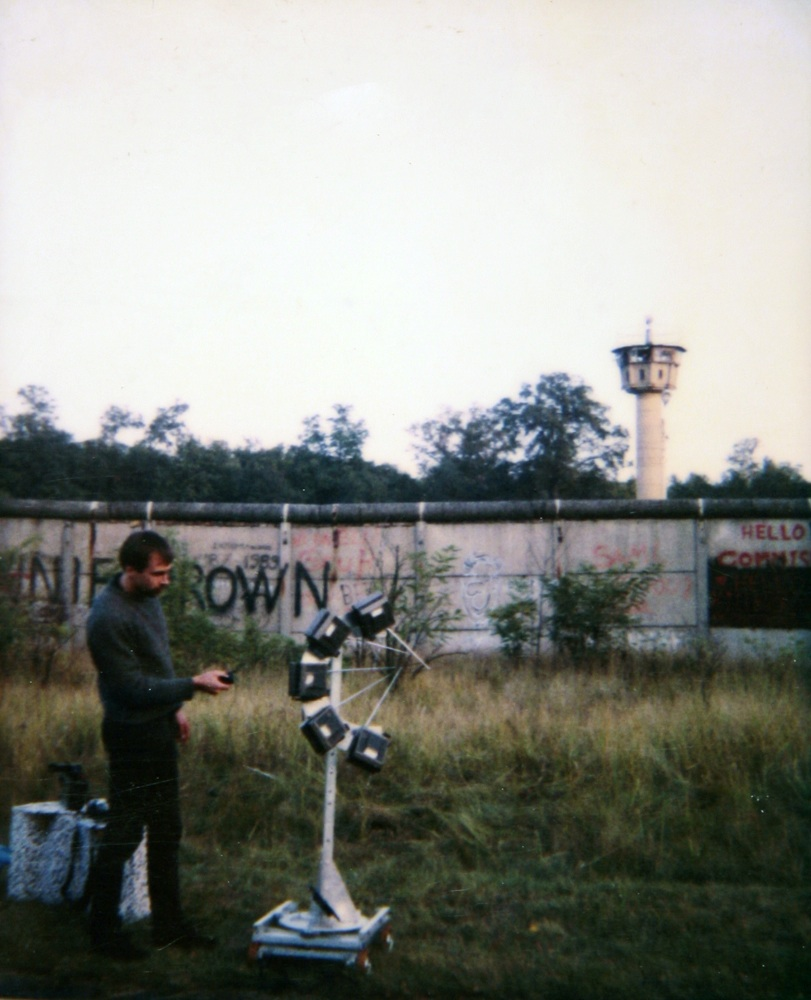
Graham Smith Berlin Wall 1988.

Smith directed the VRAAP program (Virtual Reality Artist Access Program) at the McLuhan Program in Culture and Technology at the University of Toronto.

Smith was the only artist in the international Dutch Electronic Art Festival (DEAF) to display 2 large scale works, "MOBI" and "Morphing Machinery" and is one of the founders of the German art collective, Cybercity Ruhr.
