= Olga Kisseleva =

French artist

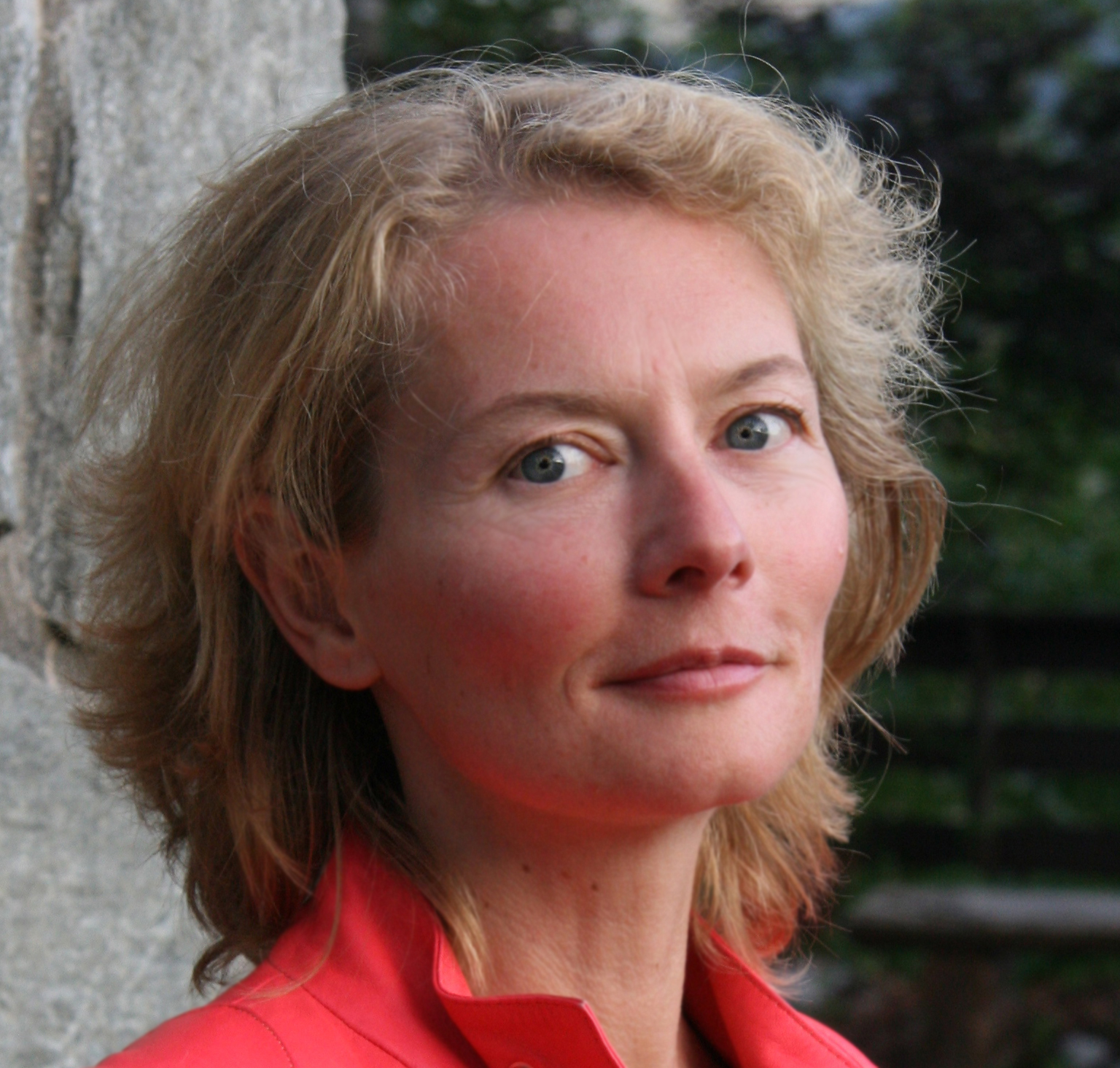

Olga Kisseleva is a French artist. Olga Kisseleva works mainly in installation, science and media art. Her work employs various media, including video, immersive virtual reality, the Web, wireless technology, performance, large-scale art installations and interactive exhibitions.

== Biography ==
As early as the beginning of the 1990s Olga Kisseleva became, thanks to an invitation by the Fulbright Foundation, part of a team of creators working on the development of numerical technologies in the United States. She primarily stays at Columbia University and University of California, where she participates in the adventure of the first start-ups of the Silicon Valley.

Olga Kisseleva teaches New media art and Art&Science in the Université Paris 1 Panthéon-Sorbonne. From 2007 to 2009 she was a member of the High Scientific Committee of Sorbonne.

The work of Olga Kisseleva constantly interweaves actions that reveal themselves in the urban environments or in network with interventions in galleries and museums. For the 5th Dakar Contemporary Art Biennial, she presented « Une Voyante m’a dit... », an alarming method, where the artiste publicly exchanges her look with different participants to symbolically endorse their identity and see the world through their eyes. « Where are you? » places the phenomenon of the teleobjectivity to the centre of the project while proposing an immersion within reality, in environments that truly raise the imagination. Leaving one collects photographs accumulated during their peregrinations through the world; the artiste makes obvious the impressive gaps to which one attends in all contemporary megalopolis. Rewarded by the International Prize ProArte (Russia), Olga Kisseleva works in collaboration with The Academy of Sciences « Hybrid Space », a body of twelve interactive installations, a perilous game, that explores the capacity of the spectator to reveal the presence of a border, that separates reality and the imagination.

== Main exhibitions ==
The artist's exhibitions include: Modern Art Museum (Paris, France), State Russian Museum, (Saint-Petersburg, Russia), Kiasma (Helsinki, Finland), Museo Nacional Centro de Arte Reina Sofia (Madrid, Spain), Moscow Biennale (2007), Dakar Biennale (2002), Fondation Cartier pour l'Art Contemporain (Paris, France), Centre Georges Pompidou (Paris, France), Art Institute of Chicago (Chicago, USA), National Centre for Contemporary Arts (Moscow, Russia).

== Bibliography ==
- Olga Kisseleva "Nano Worlds: Custom Made", Le nouveau festival Centre Georges Pompidou, Onestarpress, Paris, France, 2013
- "Le temps à l'oeuvre", co-edition Louvre-Lens et Invenit Éditions, Paris, France, 2012
- Olga Kisseleva Has No Addicted "Double Life", les presses du réel, Dijon, France, 2011
- "Aesthetics of the Worst", Centre Pompidou Metz – Lienart, Paris, France, 2011
- REWRITING WORLDS", 4th Moscow Biennale of Contemporary Art, Moscow, Russia, 2011
- "female nano", Moscow Museum of Modern Art, MMOMA, Moscow, Russia, 2011
- "Inspiration Dior", La Martiniere Paris, France, 2011
- "Russian Artists Abroad - 20 century", interviews by Erik Bulatov, Ilya Kabakov, Olga Kisseleva, Oscar Rabin, Vladimir Yankilevsky, Boris Zaborov..., NCCA (National Centre for Contemporary Arts), Moscow, Russia, 2010
- "REGARDS SUR L'ART CONTEMPORAIN RUSSE 1990 -2010", Olivier Vargin, l'Harmattan, Paris, France, 2010
- "The History of Gender and Art in Post-Soviet Space", Olesya Turkina, Viktor Mazin, Margarita & Victor Tupitsyn, Alla Mitrofanova, Natalia Kolodzei, ..., MMOMA Moscow Museum of Modern Art, Moscow, Russia, 2010
- "Shockworkers of the Mobile Image", Boris Groys, Ekaterina Degot, David Riff, Cosmin Costinas, ..., 1st Ural Industrial Biennial of contemporary art, Ekaterinburg, Russia, 2010
- "Lesson of History", catalog, ICA, Moscow, Russia, 2010, texts by Joseph Backstein, AES+F, Andrey Parshikov, Dmitry Goutov, Arseny Jiliaev, Olga Kisseleva, Irina Korina, Andrey Monastyrsky, Anatoly Osmolovsky...
- "2nd Western China Contemporary Art Biennale", Beiging, China, 2010
- "Art x-ray", 2nd Western China Contemporary Art Biennale, Beiging, China, 2010
- "Art perspective", 2nd Western China Contemporary Art Biennale, Beiging, China, 2010
- "FUTUROLOGIA. Russian Utopia", Garage Center for Contemporary Culture, Moscow, Russia, 2010
- Olga Kisseleva – Divers Faits, Olga Kisseleva, Manou Farine, Claire Guezengar, Hélèna Villovitch, Éditions Jannink, Paris, 2010
- "It might never happen", Centre Pompidou Metz, Metz, France, 2010
- "Indomitable Women", Video Art World, Barcelona, Spain, 2010
- "To be here and there: general relativity and quantum physics" PLASTK Art&Science #1, Université Paris 1 Panthéon-Sorbonne, Paris, France, 2009
- "Genipulation", catalog, Kunsthaus Pasquart, Biel, Switzerland, 2009
- "Valeurs croisées", 1st Rennes Contemporary Art Biennale, les presses du réel, Dijon, France, 2009
- "Superlight : Global Festival of Art on the Edge", MOCA Cleveland, USA, 2009
- "15 years of NetArt", WJ-SPOTS, Paris, France, 2009
- "Olga Kisseleva: atelier de production", Centre Photographique Île-de-France (CPIF), Paris, 2009
- "Art-Nature", Horizons, Sancy, France, 2009
- Olga Kisseleva: "Soyez réalistes, demandez l’impossible!" Semaine, Arles, 2008
- "TOOL BOX", Entre-deux, Nantes, France, 2008
- "L'Argent", FRAC Île-de-France, Paris, France, 2008
- "Another Voice – WE", Shanghai Art Museum, Shanghai, China, 2008
- CrossWorlds, Elisabeth Lebovici, Archibooks, Paris, France, 2008
- Olga Kisseleva, signs that don’t lie, Christophe Kihm, Marc Chagall Museum, Nice, France, 2008
- Olga Kisseleva, Viktor Misiano, Isthme, Paris, France, 2007
- Where are you ?, Onestarpress, Paris, France, 2006
- Imagemakers, Louis Cabri, TNG, Calgary, Canada, 2005
- Olga Kisseleva, a clearing between East and West, Larissa Soloviova, National Centre for Contemporary Arts, Moscow, Russia, 2004
- Instrument Flying Rules, Laurence Hazout-Dreyfus, La Passerelle, Brest, France, 2004
- Hybrid Space, Arcady Ippolitov, PRO ARTE Foundation, Saint-Petersburg, Russia, 2002
- A Wrong City, Alexandre Borovsky, State Russian Museum, Saint-Petersburg, Russia, 2001
- Where are you ?, Stephen Wright, National Centre for Contemporary Arts, Moscow, Russia, 2001
- A clairvoyant told me I have a problem with my eyes : that I couldn’t face reality..., Frederic Bougle, Le Festin, Bordeaux, France, 2001
- Communication – identification, Lev Manovich, DAC, Paris, France, 1998
