= Cyberfeminism =

Feminist approach

Cyberfeminism is a feminist approach which foregrounds the relationship between cyberspace, the Internet, and technology. It can refer to philosophies, art practices, methodologies, or communities. The term was coined in the early 1990s to describe the work of feminists interested in theorizing, critiquing, exploring and re-making the Internet, cyberspace and new-media technologies in general.

The foundational catalyst for the formation of cyberfeminist thought is often attributed by Europeans to Donna Haraway's "A Cyborg Manifesto", third wave feminism, post-structuralist feminism, riot grrrl culture and the feminist critique of the alleged erasure of women within discussions of digital technologies.

== Definition ==
The first use of the term cyberfeminist has been attributed to Australian artists and art collectives. The inception of the cyberfeminist art movement is described by one of its pioneers, Linda Dement, as one that

"coagulated and sparked in the reject-outsider mutiny, trauma-jouissance and fast hard beat of queer punk. It found visible existence and a manifesto, through VNS Matrix in the (typical) Adelaide heat wave of 1991… Cyberfeminism, as blurred edge range, entangles carnality with code; machines, blood and bad language; poetry and disdain; executables, theft and creative fabrication. It incites and follows lines of flight powered by contradiction, relatedness, transgression, and misbehaviour. It simultaneously embraces logic and unreason, giving the finger to binaries as it ravishes them."

VNS Matrix's A Cyberfeminist Manifesto for the 21st Century was published online in 1991. Cyberfeminism is an alliance that seeks awareness to defy any sort of boundaries of identity and definition to be truly postmodern in its potential for radical openness. This is seen with the 1997 Old Boys Network's 100 anti-theses which lists the 100 ways "cyberfeminism is not." Cornelia Sollfrank from the Old Boys Network states that:

Cyberfeminism is a myth. A myth is a story of unidentifiable origin, or of different origins. A myth is based on one central story which is retold over and over in different variations. A myth denies one history as well as one truth, and implies a search for truth in the spaces, in the differences between the different stories. Speaking about Cyberfeminism as a myth, is not intended to mystify it, it simply indicates that Cyberfeminism only exists in plural.

Mia Consalvo defines cyberfeminism as:

1. a label for women—especially young women who might not even want to align with feminism's history—not just to consume new technologies but to actively participate in their making;
2. a critical engagement with new technologies and their entanglement with power structures and systemic oppression.

The early cyberfeminist perspective takes a utopian view of cyberspace and the Internet as a means of freedom from social constructs such as gender, sex difference and race. For instance, a description of the concept described it as a struggle to be aware of the impact of new technologies on the lives of women as well as the so-called insidious gendering of technoculture in everyday life. It also sees technology as a means to link the body with machines. This is demonstrated in the way cyberfeminism—as maintained by theorists such as Barbara Kennedy—is said to define a specific cyborgian consciousness concept, which denotes a way of thinking that breaks down binary and oppositional discourses. There is also the case of the renegotiation of the artificial intelligence (AI), which is considered top-down masculinist, into bottom-up feminized version labeled as ALife programming.

In "Cyberfeminist Bed Sheet Flown as a Flag" (2018–19) Linda Dement and Nancy Mauro-Flude devised a performance of the bed-sheet-flag, unfurling ribbons of quotes from the stains of their sisterhood kin: "A genealogical record, it bears smears and stains from productive encounters, convergences and brush pasts. The sheet has been endlessly folded, scrunched, wrung out or smoothed flat in spawning, connecting and adulterating across feminist time and creative persuasions." Initially, Dement mapped a non-linear terrain of punk, cyberfeminism, rebellious aberration and corporeal digital transgression as a rumpled unclean bedsheet.

Authors Hawthorne and Klein explain the different analyses of cyberfeminism in their book: "Just as there are liberal, socialist, radical and postmodern feminists, so too one finds these positions reflected in the interpretations of cyberfeminism."

VNS Matrix member Julianne Pierce defines cyberfeminism: "In 1991, in a cozy Australian city called Adelaide, four bored girls decided to have some fun with art and French Feminist theory... with homage to Donna Haraway they began to play around with the idea of cyberfeminism."

Cyberfeminism is not just the subject matter, but is the approach taken to examine subject matter. For example, cyberfeminism can be a critique of equality in cyberspace, challenge the gender stereotype in cyberspace, examine the gender relationship in cyberspace, examine the collaboration between humans and technology, examine the relationship between women and technology, and more.

Sadie Plant much more viewed cyberfeminism as a project which sought to uncover the history linking femininity and technology and how traits which were feminine were both useful to technology while still being in the same historical position as technology, objectified and to serve the ends of men. For Plant, this is where the future leads, towards technology and the abandoning of man, while women and technology go hand in hand escaping "the meat" for Plant by making "the meat" and "the mind" the same.

== Theoretical background ==
Cyberfeminism arose partly as a reaction to "the pessimism of the 1980s feminist approaches that stressed the inherently masculine nature of techno-science", a counter-movement against the 'toys for boys' perception of new Internet technologies. According to a text published by Trevor Scott Milford, another contributor to the rise of cyberfeminism was the lack of female discourse and participation online concerning topics that were impacting women. As cyberfeminist artist Faith Wilding argued:

"If feminism is to be adequate to its cyberpotential then it must mutate to keep up with the shifting complexities of social realities and life conditions as they are changed by the profound impact communications technologies and techno science have on all our lives."

The goal of Cyberfeminism is to use feminist theoretical insights and strategic tools and join them with cybertechniques to battle the very real sexism, racism, and militarism encoded in the software and hardware of the Net, thus politicizing this environment.

British cultural theorist Sadie Plant chose cyberfeminism to describe her recipe for defining the feminizing influence of technology on western society and its inhabitants.

Europeans often cite Donna Haraway as the inspiration and genesis for cyberfeminism with her 1985 essay "A Cyborg Manifesto: Science, Technology, and Socialist-Feminism in the Late Twentieth Century" which was reprinted in Simians, Cyborgs and Women: The Reinvention of Nature (1991). Haraway's essay states that cyborgs are able to transcend the public and private spheres, but they do not have the ability to identify with their origins or with nature in order to develop a sense of understanding through differences between self and others. Shulamith Firestone and her book The Dialectic of Sex: The Case for Feminist Revolution has been named as a precursor to Haraway's work in cyberfeminism. Firestone's work focuses reproductive technology and advancing it to eliminate the connection of the feminine identity being connected to childbirth. Firestone believed that gender inequality and oppression against women could be solved if the roles around reproduction did not exist. Both Firestone and Haraway had ideals based on making individuals androgynous, and both women wanted society to move beyond biology by improving technology.

Cyberfeminism is considered a predecessor to networked feminism and fourth wave feminism. Cyberfeminism also has a relationship to the field of feminist science and technology studies, as well as feminist internet theory.

== Timeline ==
=== 1970s ===
Shulamith Firestone's The Dialectic of Sex: The Case for Feminist Revolution created the foundation for many cyberfeminist activities. In her book, Firestone explores the possibility of using technology to eliminate sexism by freeing women from their obligation to carry children in order to create a nuclear family. In many ways, this can be seen as a precursor to cyberfeminism because it questions the role that technology should play in dismantling the patriarchy.

=== 1980s ===
Donna Haraway was the inspiration and genesis for cyberfeminism with her 1985 essay "A Cyborg Manifesto: Science, Technology, and Socialist-Feminism in the Late Twentieth Century", which was later reprinted in Simians, Cyborgs and Women: The Reinvention of Nature (1991). Haraway's essay states that cyborgs are able to transcend the public and private spheres, but they do not have the ability to identify with their origins or with nature in order to develop a sense of understanding through differences between self and others. Haraway had ideals based on making individuals androgynous, and wanted society to move beyond biology by improving technology.

=== 1990s ===
The term cyberfeminism was first used around 1991 by both the English cultural theoretician Sadie Plant and the Australian artist group VNS Matrix, independently from each other.

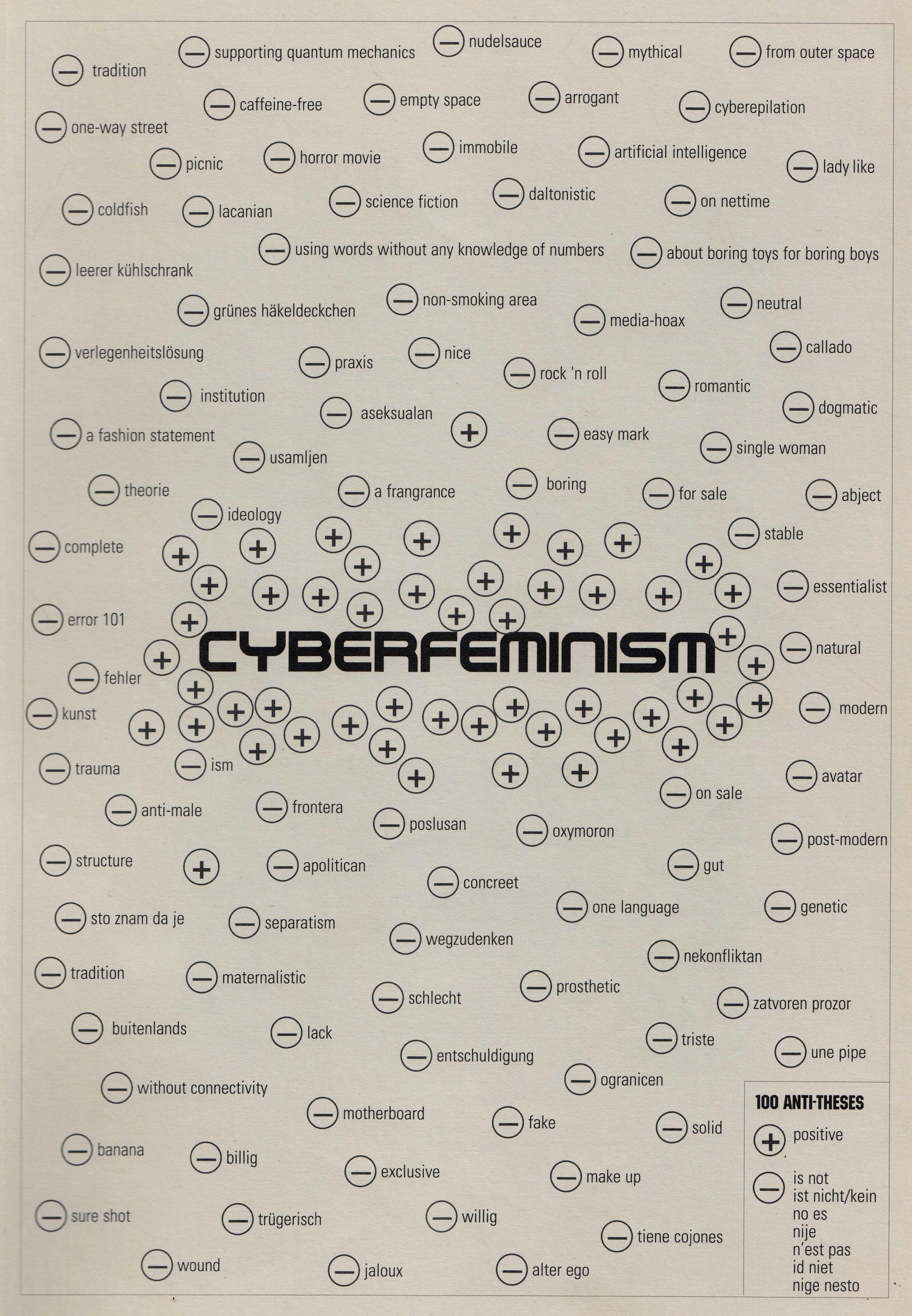
Sollfrank, Cornelia & Old Boys Network ed. 1998. First Cyberfeminist International. Hamburg: obn, CC BY 4.0

In Canada, Nancy Paterson wrote an article entitled "Cyberfeminism" for EchoNYC in 1991.

In Adelaide, Australia, a four-person collective called VNS Matrix wrote the Cyberfeminist Manifesto in 1991; they used the term cyberfeminist to label their radical feminist acts "to insert women, bodily fluids and political consciousness into electronic spaces." That same year, British cultural theorist Sadie Plant used the term to describe definition of the feminizing influence of technology on western society.

In Russia in 1995, the Cyber-Femin Club was founded in the Pushkinskaya 10 art centre in St. Petersburg to bring together ‘women working with new media’, the most prominent of whom were curator Irina Aktuganova, philosopher and cultural critic Alla Mitrofanova, and St. Petersburg artists Olga Kisseleva, Gluklya and Tsaplya.

In 1996, a special volume of Women & Performance was devoted to sexuality and cyberspace. It was a compendium of essays on cybersex, online stalking, fetal imaging, and going digital in New York.

The first Cyberfeminist International, organized by the Old Boys Network in Kassel, Germany, in 1997, refused to define the school of thought, but drafted the "100 Anti-Theses of Cyberfeminism" instead.

=== 2000s ===
In the late 1990s and early 2000s, cyberfeminist theorists and artists incorporated insights from postcolonial and subaltern studies about the intersection of gender and race, inspired by thinkers such as Donna Haraway and Gayatri Spivak. Artists such as Coco Fusco, Shu Lea Cheang, and Prema Murthy explored the intersections of gender and race through performance art, video art, and emerging technologies such as interactive websites, digital graphics, and streaming media.

In 2003 the feminist anthology Sisterhood Is Forever: The Women's Anthology for a New Millennium was published; it includes the essay "Cyberfeminism: Networking the Net" by Amy Richards and Marianne Schnall.

=== 2010s ===
Usage of the term cyberfeminism has faded away after the millennium, partly as a result of the dot.com bubble burst that bruised the utopian bent of much of digital culture. Radhika Gajjala and Yeon Ju Oh's Cyberfeminism 2.0 argues that cyberfeminism in the 21st century has taken many new forms and focuses on the different aspects of women's participation online. It also includes the promotion of feminist ideals on more modernized technology. This included the emergence of several feminist blogs. They find cyberfeminists in women's blogging networks and their conferences, in women's gaming, in fandom, in social media, in online mothers' groups performing pro-breastfeeding activism, and in online spaces developed and populated by marginal networks of women in non-Western countries.

While there are writing on black cyberfeminism which argue that not only is race not absent in our use of the internet, but race is a key component in how we interact with the internet. However, women of colour generally do not associate with cyberfeminism, and rather re-frame africanfuturism, afrofuturism in feminist terms.

Although cyberfeminist literature declined in volume during the early 2010s, cyberfeminist artistic practices continued to develop. Their artistic and theoretical contributions have influenced feminist internet theory and posthuman aesthetics.

=== 2020s ===
In the early 2020s, the coinciding of the COVID-19 pandemic causing increased activity in online spaces and increased awareness of racial injustices such as police brutalities against black people has led to more awareness of intersectionality in online spaces, especially cyberfeminism movements. While studies have noted online spaces have had an increasingly diverse userbase, these have come with increased backlash against women and non-white people. Many of these minorities, especially black women, have noted that their social identities have continued into a virtual space, and therefore still face the same prejudices online as they did offline.

== Non-white cyberfeminism ==
In the lens of non-white feminists, many have criticized the centering of white, cisgendered female perspectives and the lack of acknowledgement of intersectionality in non-white perspectives. Because of this, many have distanced themselves from the label of cyberfeminism in favor of others such as afrofuturism.

Additionally, this distancing from white-centered cyberfeminism also acknowledges many of the non-white cultures that the ideals of cyberfeminism were inspired by. For example, the Japanese cyberpunk genre often utilizes themes such as the connection between gender and technology in anime such as Ghost in the Shell. In this particular case, the distancing from cyberfeminism especially felt necessary due to the "obsession with rapid modernization and robotization of Japan at the current level of development of social and humanitarian knowledge [that was] criticized by many as techno-orientalism."

=== Black cyberfeminism ===
Black cyberfeminism consists of virtual feminisms, Black feminist thought, and intersectionality. It provides a framework for examining how intersecting identities, social influences, and individual experiences shape the lives of Black women.

== Xenofeminism ==
Xenofeminism is a feminist movement that advocates the use of technology to challenge and ultimately abolish gender-based hierarchies. It is an offshoot of cyberfeminism developed by the feminist collective Laboria Cuboniks. In its manifesto, Xenofeminism: A Politics for Alienation, the collective argues against nature as desirable and immutable in favor of a future where gender is dislodged from power and in which feminism destabilizes and uses the master's tools for its own rebuilding of life. The movement has three main characteristics: it is techno-materialist, anti-naturalist, and advocates for gender abolition. This means that the movement contradicts naturalist ideals that state that there are only two genders and aims toward the abolition of the "binary gender system". Xenofeminism differs from cyberfeminism because while it has similar ideals, it is inclusive to the queer and transgender communities. The manifesto states:

Xenofeminism is gender-abolitionist. 'Gender abolitionism' is shorthand for the ambition to construct a society where traits currently assembled under the rubric of gender, no longer furnish a grid for the asymmetric operation of power. 'Race abolitionism' expands into a similar formula – that the struggle must continue until currently racialized characteristics are no more a basis of discrimination than the color of one's eyes. Ultimately, every emancipatory abolitionism must incline towards the horizon of class abolitionism, since it is in capitalism where we encounter oppression in its transparent, denaturalized form: you're not exploited or oppressed because you are a wage labourer or poor; you are a labourer or poor because you are exploited.

== Critiques ==
One of the major critiques of cyberfeminism, especially as it was in its heyday in the 1990s, was that it required economic privilege to get online: "By all means let [poor women] have access to the Internet, just as all of us have it—like chocolate cake or AIDS," writes activist Annapurna Mamidipudi. "Just let it not be pushed down their throats as 'empowering.' Otherwise this too will go the way of all imposed technology and achieve the exact opposite of what it purports to do." Such economic privilege often exists in colonialist states, and is built upon technologies that profit from the colonization of native land. In such cases, "we must take a particular stance grounded in de/anticolonial relations when examining technology against the backdrop of discrete though globally linked colonialisms."

== Art and artists ==
The practice of cyberfeminist art is inextricably intertwined with cyberfeminist theory. The 100 anti-theses make clear that cyberfeminism is not just about theory, while theory is extremely important, cyberfeminism requires participation. As one member of the cyberfeminist collective the Old Boys Network writes, cyberfeminism is "linked to aesthetic and ironic strategies as intrinsic tools within the growing importance of design and aesthetics in the new world order of flowing pancapitalism". Cyberfeminism also has strong connections with the DIY feminism movement, as noted in the seminal text DIY Feminism.

Around the late 1990s several cyberfeminist artists and theorists gained a measure of recognition for their works, including Linda Dement and the above-mentioned VNS Matrix their Cyberfeminist Manifesto for the 21st century, and Faith Wilding and Critical Art Ensemble. Some of the better-known examples of cyberfeminist work include Auriea Harvey's work, Sandy Stone, Nancy Paterson, Linda Dement's Cyberflesh Girlmonster a hypertext CD-ROM that incorporates images of women's body parts and remixes them to create new monstrous yet beautiful shapes; Olga Kisseleva's How Are You? and Red Flag Factory; Melinda Rackham's Carrier, a work of web-based multimedia art that explores the relationship between humans and infectious agents; Prema Murthy's 1998 work Bindigirl, a satirical Asian porn website that examines the intersection of racialized gender, sexuality, and religion online; Murthy's 2000 project Mythic Hybrid, based on reports of mass hysteria among microchip factory workers in India; Shu Lea Cheang's 1998 work Brandon, which was the first Internet based artwork to be commissioned and collected by the Guggenheim. A later work of Cheang's, I.K.U. (2001), is a sci-fi pornographic film that imagines a cybersexual post-Blade Runner universe, where sexual encounters with feminine, shapeshifting "replicants" are distilled and collected for resale, and ultimately reuse. I.K.U. was the first pornographic film to screen at Sundance. Dr. Caitlin Fisher's online hypertext novella "These Waves of Girls" is set in three time periods of the protagonist exploring polymorphous perversity enacted in her queer identity through memory. The story is written as a reflection diary of the interconnected memories of childhood, adolescence, and adulthood. It consists of a multimodal collection of nodes featuring linked text, still and moving images, manipulable images, animations, and sound clips. Recent artworks of note include Evelin Stermitz's World of Female Avatars in which the artist has collected quotes and images from women over the world and displayed them in an interactive browser based format, and Regina Pinto's Many Faces of Eve. Orphan Drift (1994–2003) were a 4.5 person collective experimenting with writing, art, music and the internet's potential "treating information as matter and the image as a unit of contagion."

== Listserves ==
An important part of the generation of cyberfeminist theory and critique was the emergence of a few critical listserves that served as the basis for the organization of three international cyberfeminist events and several major publications.

- Nettime – More broadly situated in new media theory, the nettime listserve became a site for the discussion, performance, and arbitration of cyberfeminist theory in 1997.
- FACES – The FACES-l.net mailing list started in the spring of 1997 partly out of a series of concurrent dinner conversations known as the Face Settings Project. The initial goal of the project was to bring together women working at the intersections of art and media to share their work and to counter the lack of women's work presented at international festivals. Faces-l was created as a means for the artists, curators, DJs, designers, activists, programmers, and technologists to meet at festivals to share their work and discuss gender and media with an international community of women.

== Notable theorists ==
- Shulamith Firestone
- Radhika Gajjala
- N. Katherine Hayles
- Donna Haraway
- Susanna Paasonen
- Sadie Plant

== See also ==
- Cyborg feminism
- FemTechNet
- Net art
- Post-humanism
- Speculative realism
- Transhumanism
- TechnoFeminism
