= Merren Ricketson =

Australian arts educator

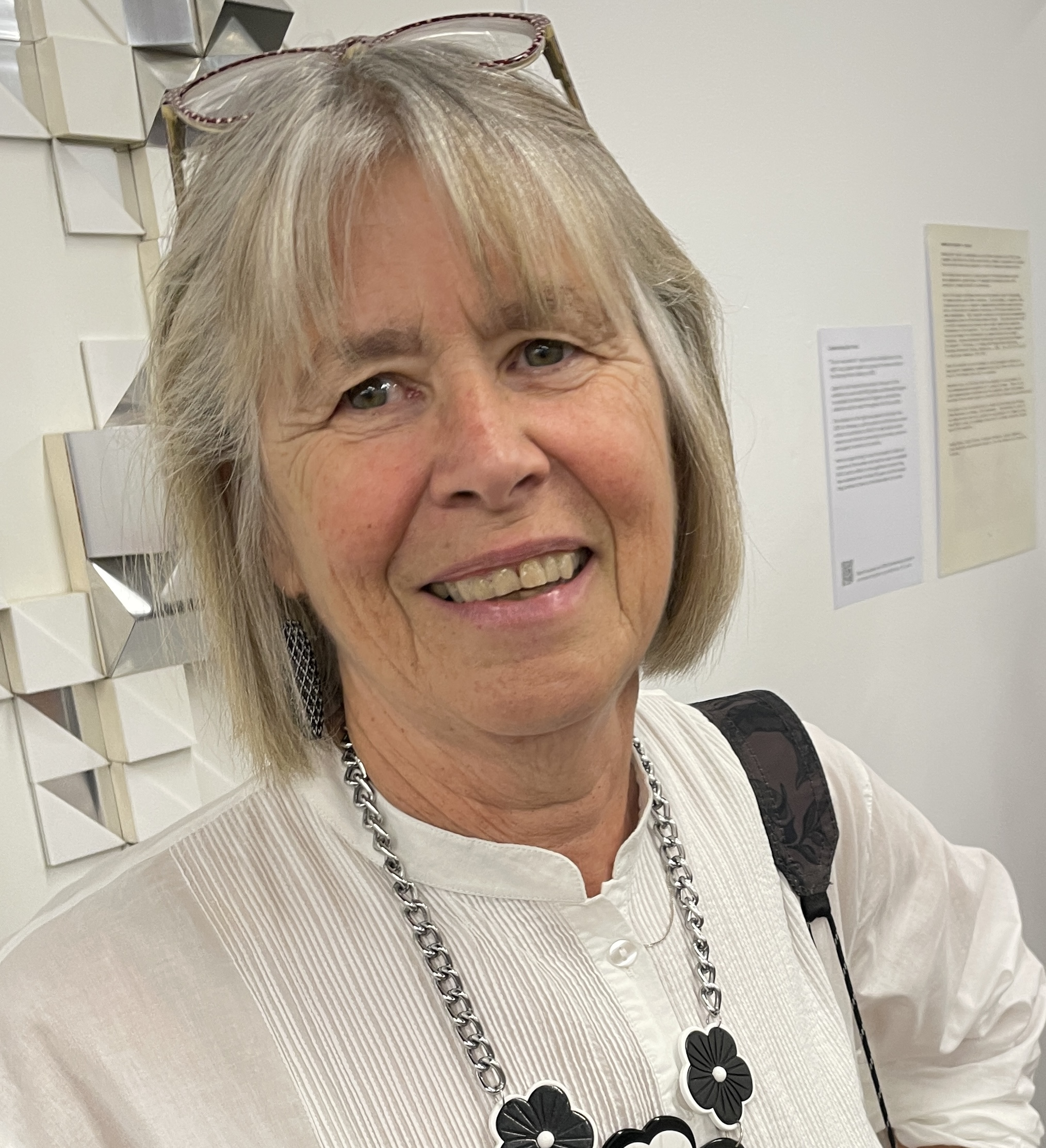
- Merren Ricketson at the 50 years of the Women’s Art Register exhibition 2025
- Occupations: Arts educator, curator
- Notable work: Completing the Picture: Women artists and the Heidelberg Era (1992)

Merren Ricketson is an Australian arts educator with a strong focus on women artists, and a Life Member of the Women's Art Register.

== Curation and arts education ==
Ricketson was a sessional educator at the National Gallery of Victoria (NGV). She curated Top Arts, an annual exhibition with the NGV presenting artmaking by Victorian students studying the Victorian Certificate of Education (VCE), and managed the Victorian Curriculum and Assessment Authority's Season of Excellence Festival, working with student artists, designers, performers, musicians and filmmakers for over a decade.

Ricketson was Co-founder (with Helen Vivian) of Artmoves Inc. (1988-2000), a not for profit association for the support and promotion of women's art and artists. Artmoves developed group and solo exhibitions by Australian women artists, and catalysed education programs at various galleries including Australian Centre for Contemporary Art. Artmoves produced the ground breaking exhibition Completing the Picture: Women artists and the Heidelberg Era (1992), curated by Victoria Hammond and Juliette Peers, with accompanying 88 page catalogue, edited by Helen Vivian. Completing the Picture researched and uncovered previously unknown women artists of the Heidelberg School, and critiqued the representation of the work of women artists from that era. The exhibition toured to 9 Australian metropolitan and regional galleries in 1992/1993 including Ballarat Fine Art Gallery, Castlemaine Art Gallery, Benalla Art Gallery, and Heide Museum of Modern Art (VIC), S.H.Ervin Gallery (NSW), Carrick Hill Gallery (South Australia), where the exhibition was opened by Margaret Whitlam, Queen Victoria Museum and Art Gallery, Tasmanian Museum and Art Gallery (TAS), and Art Gallery of Western Australia, (WA). The exhibition featured the work of 19 women artists from 1876-1916, including: Cristina Asquith Baker, Alice Bale, Emma Minnie Boyd, Alice Chapman, Florence Fuller, Portia Geach, Ina Gregory, Grace Joel, Dora Meeson, Mary Meyer, Josephine Muntz Adams, Helen Peters, Jane Price, Iso Rae, Dora Serle, Clara Southern, Jane Sutherland, Violet Teague, May Vale.

Ricketson was the education coordinator for the exhibition Flesh After Fifty, curated by Jane Scott. Flesh After Fifty focused on confronting negative stereotypes of aging women through reframing images of older women through art.

Ricketson published the Public arts kit: The basics in starting out and taking your art to the world! with Helen Millicer. And her essay 'Seeing and Remembering' was published in the catalogue for the exhibition Seen and Unseen: Expressions of Koorie Identity held at the Koorie Heritage Trust in 2021.

== Research and advocacy ==
Art In A Cold Climate was a six month research project by the Women's Art Register, undertaken by Ricketson and Bernadette Burke. They investigated the representation and media coverage of women artists as students, graduates, art educators and exhibiting artists, as well as media coverage in newspapers, and the representation of women artists in Australian art textbooks. A five-page summary of the research was published with discussion and analysis by Ricketson, Bernadette Burke and Erica McGilchrist. This was republished in the Women's Art Register Bulletin No. 64, June 2019. Art in a Cold Climate was used to provide data and inform the Women's Art Register's public submission for the Parliamentary Inquiry into Australia's Creative and Cultural Industries and Institutions in 2020.

In 2020, Ricketson was interviewed by Katie Ryan, in conversation with Alex Cuffe, for It Comes In Waves, a conversation series hosted by Ryan and published as an audio series by the Women's Art Register. Other participants include Meredith Rogers and Manisha Anjali, Georgia Banks and Juliette Peers, Lara Chamas and Natalie Thomas, Alice McIntosh and Bonita Ely.
