= Janine Burke =

Australian author, art historian, biographer, photographer and novelist

- Born: Janine Burke; Melbourne, Australia
- Education: University of Melbourne, La Trobe University, Deakin University
- Occupations: Writer, art historian, curator

Janine Burke is an Australian author, art historian, biographer, novelist and photographer. She also curates exhibitions of historical and contemporary art. She is Honorary Senior Fellow, Faculty of Fine Arts and Music, University of Melbourne. She was born in Melbourne in 1952.

== Education ==
Burke attended Catholic Ladies College, East Melbourne (1965-1967), then Malvern Girls High School (1967-1970). She won a Commonwealth Government Scholarship which enabled her to attend the University of Melbourne. She graduated in 1974 with a Bachelor of Arts (Hons), majoring in art history. In 1986 she was awarded a Master of Arts at La Trobe University, and a PhD from Deakin University in 2002.

== Career ==
=== 1970s-1980s ===
In 1973, Burke began to publish art reviews and essays. The following year, she co-curated A Room of One's Own: Three Women Artists, perhaps Australia's first feminist group exhibition with Lynne Cook and Kiffy Rubbo, director of the George Paton Gallery, University of Melbourne. The artists were Lesley Dumbrell, Julie Irving and Ann Newmarch. In 1975, Burke was a founding member of the Women's Art Movement in Melbourne. She was commissioned by Rubbo to curate Australian Women Artists: 1840-1940. A national touring exhibition, the research was published as a book in 1980.

In 1975, she was a founding member of the feminist arts journal Lip.

From 1977 to 1982, Burke was the inaugural art history lecturer at the Victorian College of the Arts where she designed and taught the art history course for undergraduate and postgraduate students. During that time she curated retrospectives of Joy Hester and Bea Maddock at the National Gallery of Victoria.

She resigned to become a novelist and independent scholar.

In 1983, after the publication of Joy Hester, Burke left Australia for Tuscany. She had a residency at Paretaio, the house belonging to Australian artist Arthur Boyd and his wife Yvonne situated halfway between Pisa and Florence. Judith Blackall had established the Boyd home as a studio and residency for artists, administered by the Australia Council for the Arts. Artists resident around the same time as Burke included Janet Laurence, Elizabeth Gower, John R. Neeson and Domenico de Clario. Burke moved to Florence where she studied Italian at the British Institute. In 1984, she sojourned in Paris, where she befriended artists Stephen Benwell, Anton Hart, Bronwyn Oliver and Don Walters (all resident at the Cite Internationale des Arts) and translator Julie Rose. She then returned to Australia for the publication of Speaking.

In 1986, Burke was appointed to the inaugural board of the Melbourne Writers Festival held at the Athenaeum Theatre in Melbourne's CBD. Her novel, Second Sight won the 1987 Victorian Premier's Literary Award for fiction. In 1986, she was writer-in-residence in Hobart and in 1989 at the University of New England, Armidale.

In the mid-80s, Burke settled in Robe Street, St Kilda, where Joy Hester and Albert Tucker had lived in the 1940s. She continued to write fiction, both novels and short stories, as well as contributing art reviews and essays to journals and newspapers. She was an advisory editor to art and literary journals including Art and Australia, Imprint, Island and Meanjin.

=== 1990s ===
Burke has judged literary awards, including the Hazel Rowley Literary Fellowship and The Age Book of the Year. Between 1994 and 1997, she was a member of the programming committee of the Melbourne Writers Festival.

In 1995, Burke published Dear Sun: The Letters of Joy Hester and Sunday Reed, the correspondence between Hester and arts patron Sunday Reed. Tucker made his photographs available for Burke to illustrate the book. Sunday, Hester's closest friend, had, with her husband John, adopted Hester's son, Sweeney. In 1981, Sunday and John Reed's home and their art collection became the Heide Museum of Modern Art. When Burke was a lecturer at the Victorian College of the Arts, Sweeney, an artist and a former gallery director, was a mature age student in the printmaking department. Sweeney generously assisted Burke with her research on Hester. In 1979, Sweeney tragically took his life.

=== 2000s ===
From 1996 to 2004, Burke was a trustee of Heide MoMA. She was a member of the committee which oversaw the restoration of Heide I, the Reed's original home on the property, which opened to the public in 2001.

Burke's biography of Tucker, written with Tucker's approval, encountered problems prior to its publication in 2002. Tucker died in 1999 without reading the manuscript. Australian Gothic, A Life of Albert Tucker was Burke's doctoral dissertation and the first biography of Tucker. Barbara Tucker, Tucker's widow, objected to the book and refused to allow copyright permission to reproduce his paintings. The book was illustrated with Tucker's photographs which were not subject to copyright, as they were taken before the 1950s. In 1998, Burke had curated an exhibition of Tucker's photographs, titled The Eye of the Beholder: Albert Tucker's Photographs which opened at Heide MoMA and then toured nationally.

In late 2001, when the issues about the book became public, Burke was asked to resign from the Heide MoMA board. It was believed that the Tucker Gift to Heide MoMA was in jeopardy. The controversy is discussed by Katrina Strickland in Affairs of the Art: Love, Loss and Power in the Artworld (2013).

In Australian Gothic, Burke wrote it was unlikely that Sweeney was the son of Albert Tucker, but rather of well-known Melbourne drummer Billy Hyde (1918–1976). Burke based her comments on conversations with Tucker, Sweeney, Gray Smith (Hester's second husband), Peregrine Smith (her second son) and Nadine Amadio, a close friend of Sunday Reed's.

The Heart Garden: Sunday Reed and Heide (2004) takes its title from a small, heart-shaped garden of forget-me-nots and chamomile that Reed planted to commemorate her relationship with Sidney Nolan. In the biography, Burke wrote that Reed had likely assisted Nolan in painting the Ned Kelly series. She based her theory on the collaborative relationship that Reed and Nolan enjoyed, evidenced by archival research, and by Nolan's watercolour For the one who paints such beautiful squares (c.1946-1947, Heide MoMA) that is dedicated to Sunday. With film producer Richard Keddie, Burke is a consultant to a film project about Heide.

=== 2004 - ===
After visiting the Freud Museum London where Sigmund Freud's art collection of over 2000 antiquities is housed, Burke wrote The Gods of Freud: Sigmund Freud's Art Collection (2006) which was shortlisted for the NSW Premier's Literary Award. In 2007, with the Freud Museum of London, she curated "An Archaeology of the Mind: Sigmund Freud's Art Collection" for Monash University Museum of Art and the Nicholson Museum, University of Sydney. Burke also curated "Freud and Eros: Love, Lust and Longing" at the Freud Museum London in 2014.

In 2011, Burke's photography exhibition, Personal View: Photographs 1978-1986, was held at VCA Margaret Lawrence Gallery, Melbourne (now Fiona and Sidney Myer Gallery). A book of the same name was published by Monash University Publishing to coincide with the exhibition.

Nest: The Art of Birds (Allen & Unwin 2012) was also an exhibition of the same title which Burke curated for McClelland Sculpture Park + Gallery in 2013. The nests were selected from the collection of Museum Victoria and the private collection of Gay Bilson.

Burke's engagement with the natural world lead her to write Source: Nature's Healing Role in Art and Writing (2009) and My Forests: Travels with Trees (2021) and to curate Human/Animal/Artist: Art Inspired by Animals for McClelland Sculpture Park + Gallery in 2016.

With Adrian Martin, she organised "Impresario: Paul Taylor Art & Text POPISM" at Monash University in 2012. Edited by Helen Hughes and Nicholas Croggan, the papers were published as Impresario: Paul Taylor The Melbourne Years 1981-1984 (2013).

In 2014, Burke organised the conference "Kiffy Rubbo and the George Paton Gallery: Curating the 1970s" at the University of Melbourne. In 2016, she co-edited a book of the same name with Helen Hughes.

Currently, she is writing a memoir for which she was awarded an Australia Council for the Arts (now Creative Australia) grant in 2022.

== Awards, nominations and competitive grants ==
- Australia Council for the Arts grant (2022)
- Australia Council for the Arts Established Writers Grant (2014)
- Monash University Research Fellowship (2009-2013)
- Shortlisted 2007 NSW Premier's Literary Award for Non-fiction The Gods of Freud: Sigmund Freud's Art Collection
- Shortlisted 2003 Queensland Premier's Award for Non-Fiction Australian Gothic: A Life of Albert Tucker
- Shortlisted 1990 for Miles Franklin Award, Company of Images
- Shortlisted 1990 The Age Book of the Year Award, Company of Images
- Winner 1987 Victorian Premier's Literary Award, Vance Palmer Prize for Fiction Second Sight

== Publications: books ==
=== Non-fiction books and art exhibition catalogues ===
- Australian Women Artists: 1840-1940 (1980)
- Joy Hester (1983:revised and republished 2001)
- Field of Vision, A Decade of Change: Women's Art in the Seventies (1990)
- Dear Sun: The Letters of Joy Hester and Sunday Reed [Ed.](1995)
- The Eye of the Beholder: Albert Tucker's Photographs (1998) Heide Museum of Modern Art
- Australian Gothic: A Life of Albert Tucker (2002)
- The Heart Garden: Sunday Reed and Heide (2004)
- The Gods of Freud: Sigmund Freud's Art Collection (2006) [published in the US as The Sphinx on the Table: Sigmund Freud's Art Collection and the Development of Psychoanalysis]
- Sigmund Freud's Collection: An Archaeology of the Mind [Essay and Catalogue] (2007) Monash University of Modern Art
- Source: Nature's Healing Role in Art and Writing (2009)
- Personal View: Photographs 1978–1986 (2011) with an essay by Anne Marsh
- Nest: The Art of Birds (2012)
- Freud and Eros: Love, Lust and Longing (2014) Essay and catalogue of works by JB. Freud Museum London
- Kiffy Rubbo: Curating the 1970s (2016) Co-edited with Helen Hughes
- Human/Animal/Artist: Art Inspired by Animals (2016) Curated and with essay by Burke. Catalogue of artworks by Penny Teale. McClelland Sculpture Park + Gallery
- My Forests: Travels with Trees (2021)

=== Fiction (adult) ===
- Speaking (1984)
- Second Sight (1986)
- Company of Images (1989)
- Lullaby (1994)

=== Fiction (young adult) ===
- Journey to Bright Water (1994)
- The Blue Faraway (1996)
- The Doll (1997)
- Our Lady of Apollo Bay (2001)

== Exhibitions curated ==
- A Room of One's Own : Three Women Artists (1974: co-curated with Kiffy Rubbo and Lynne Cook) Ewing Gallery, University of Melbourne. Lesley Dumbrell, Julie Irving and Ann Newmarch.
- Australian Women Artists, One Hundred Years, 1840-1940 (1975) Ewing Gallery and George Paton Galleries, University of Melbourne; Art Gallery of NSW; Newcastle Region Art Gallery; Art Gallery of South Australia.
- Still Lives: Eight Women Realists (1978) Victorian College of the Arts Gallery, Melbourne.
- Lost and Found: Objects and Images (1978) Ewing Gallery and George Paton Galleries, University of Melbourne. Co-curated with Meredith Rogers.
- Self-Portrait, Self-Image (1980) Victorian College of the Arts Gallery, Melbourne and tour.
- Bea Maddock: Survey Show (1980) National Gallery of Victoria.
- Joy Hester (1981) National Gallery of Victoria.
- The Eye of the Beholder: Albert Tucker's Photographs (1998) Heide Museum of Modern Art and tour.
- The Heart Garden: A Portrait of Sunday Reed at Heide (2004) Heide Museum of Modern Art.
- An Archaeology of the Mind: Sigmund Freud's Art Collection (2007–2008) Monash University Museum of Art; Nicholson Museum, University of Sydney.
- Nest: The Art of Birds. (2013) McClelland Sculpture Park + Gallery.
- Freud and Eros: Love, Lust and Longing. (2014-2015) Freud Museum, London.
- Human/Animal/Artist: Art Inspired by Animals (2016-2017) McClelland Sculpture Park + Gallery.

== Exhibitions ==
- Personal View: Photographs 1978–1986, Margaret Lawrence VCA Gallery, Melbourne, (now Fiona and Sidney Myer Gallery) 20 May–11 June 2011.

== Burke papers and photograph collections ==
- Australian feminist art timeline

Burke's papers are in the collections of the State Library of Victoria and the University of New South Wales Library, Canberra. Her photographs are in the collections of the National Gallery of Australia Library, Heide Museum of Modern Art and Monash University of Modern Art.
