= Art Almanac =

Australian monthly gallery guide

Art Almanac is a monthly guide to galleries, news and awards in Australia established in 1974.

== Monthly art guide ==
Art Almanac is issued 11 times a year, with alphabetical listings of exhibitions at select Australian galleries, organised regionally. It provides a guide to art services and artist opportunities across all Australian states and territories with city and region maps.

Art Almanac includes a database of over 1,700 artists cross-referenced with galleries, and with this data Art Almanac has proven to be a useful research resource on Australian art, providing a robust and uniform longitudinal base dataset for industry analysis as a result of the consistent industry practice to list in Art Almanac as a base level of marketing.

The online edition of Art Almanac features art news and provides listings of upcoming events.

== History ==
In 1974 George Paton Gallery, at the University of Melbourne, then under the leadership of curator Kiffy Rubbo (1944–1980), with Meredith Rogers, the gallery's assistant director, began the magazine as an informal roneo-ed publication of Melbourne gallery listings, naming the publication Art Almanac (though later confessing their misunderstanding and misuse of the term 'almanac' for a monthly publication). In the first edition for March–June 1974, they wrote, ‘We felt there was a need to compile a comprehensive listing of galleries, exhibitions, lectures, seminars and art events related to the visual arts in and around Melbourne.’ The first edition, totalling 11 pages, listed 50 galleries and 4 pages of various events. From early 1976 Art Almanac was included as a supplement to the short-lived Arts Melbourne, and by early 1979 the number of gallery listings increased to 59.

When issues became irregular in 1982, the then George Paton Gallery director Judy Annear mailed an apology to subscribers and commercial production and distribution was initiated from June 1982, with Paul Nolan as publisher, adopting the current A5 format printed on gloss art paper. Priced at $1, this monthly version of Art Almanac listed 69 galleries, all within Victoria.

Janice McCulloch (1938–2009) purchased the publication in 1985, and the magazine was then based in Sydney. Under her editorship and despite her lack of any previous publishing experience, Art Almanac expanded to include galleries in Sydney and nationally. From the slim, stapled black-and-white edition of 1982 had grown the perfect-bound full-colour magazine at the time of her death, with 186 pages listing 207 galleries in Melbourne, 153 in Sydney 153, and over 560 galleries Australia-wide. Art Almanac continued under the management of the McCulloch family before being acquired by nextmedia Pty Limited in late 2011. In December 2020, the publication settled in its new home, joining Artist Profile magazine and Art Investor at Artist Profile Pty Ltd with John Feitelson as publisher, Kon Gouriotis as managing director and Melissa Pesa as editor.
