= Hillcoat =

Hillcoat is a surname. Notable people with the surname include:

- Chris Hillcoat (born 1969), Scottish football player and coach
- John Hillcoat (born 1961), Australian film director, screenwriter and music video director
- John Hillcoat (footballer) (born 1970), Scottish football goalkeeper
- Pat Hillcoat (1935–2022), Australian nurse, feminist, activist and artist
