= Women's Art Register =

Australian art research collection

Coordinates: 37°49′31.02″S 144°59′53.87″E

The Women’s Art Register is Australia's living archive of women's art practice (cis and trans inclusive or gender diverse). It is a national artist-run, not-for-profit community and resource in Melbourne, Australia.

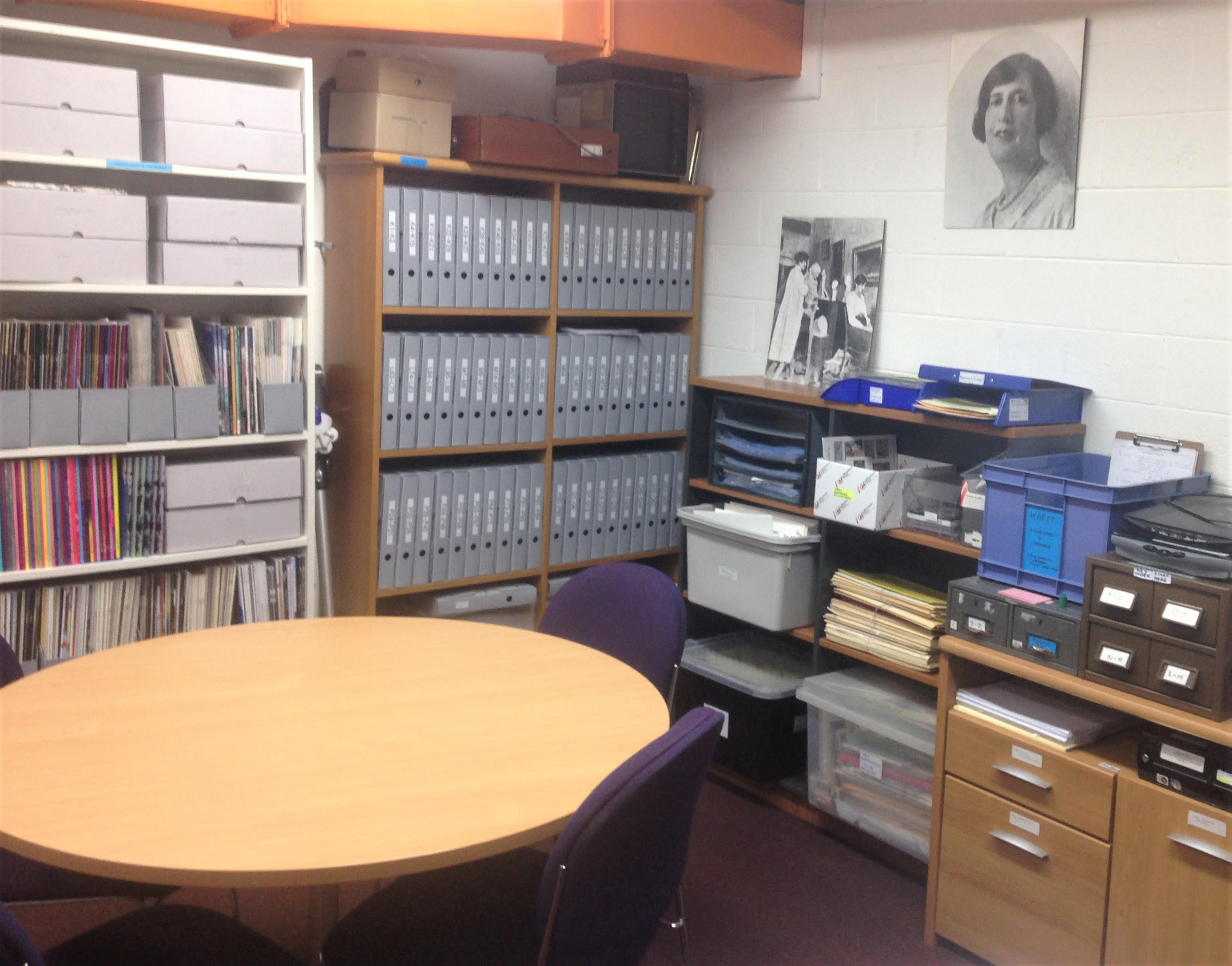
Library space at the Women's Art Register

== Foundation ==
The Women's Art Register was established in 1975 as an inclusive, grass-roots and independent platform for research, education, advocacy and celebration of Australian women artists. It was formed by artists Lesley Dumbrell and Erica McGilchrist, with the then directors of the Ewing and George Paton Gallery at Melbourne University, Kiffy Carter and Meredith Rogers. It began with one hundred contemporary women artists contributing slides of their work and was housed and administered at the Ewing Gallery. In 1977 the Women's Art Register obtained funding from the Victorian Schools Commission for historical research. Artists Anna Sande and Bonita Ely commenced this project, known as the Women's Art Register Extension Project (WAREP), in their homes, preparing photographic slides of women artists’ work and researching historic articles on Australian women artists. In 1979 the slide collection was moved to Richmond Library, City of Yarra, [originally called Carringbush Library] and amalgamated with the WAREP, where it remains today. The Women's Art Register became an Incorporated Association in 1981. It utilises a membership-based model of funding, with over 250 members from across each State and Territory in Australia. Of the many women's art archives and collectives that emerged in the 1970s in Australia, North America and Europe, the Women's Art Register remains the longest running living archive of women's and feminist art.

== The collection ==
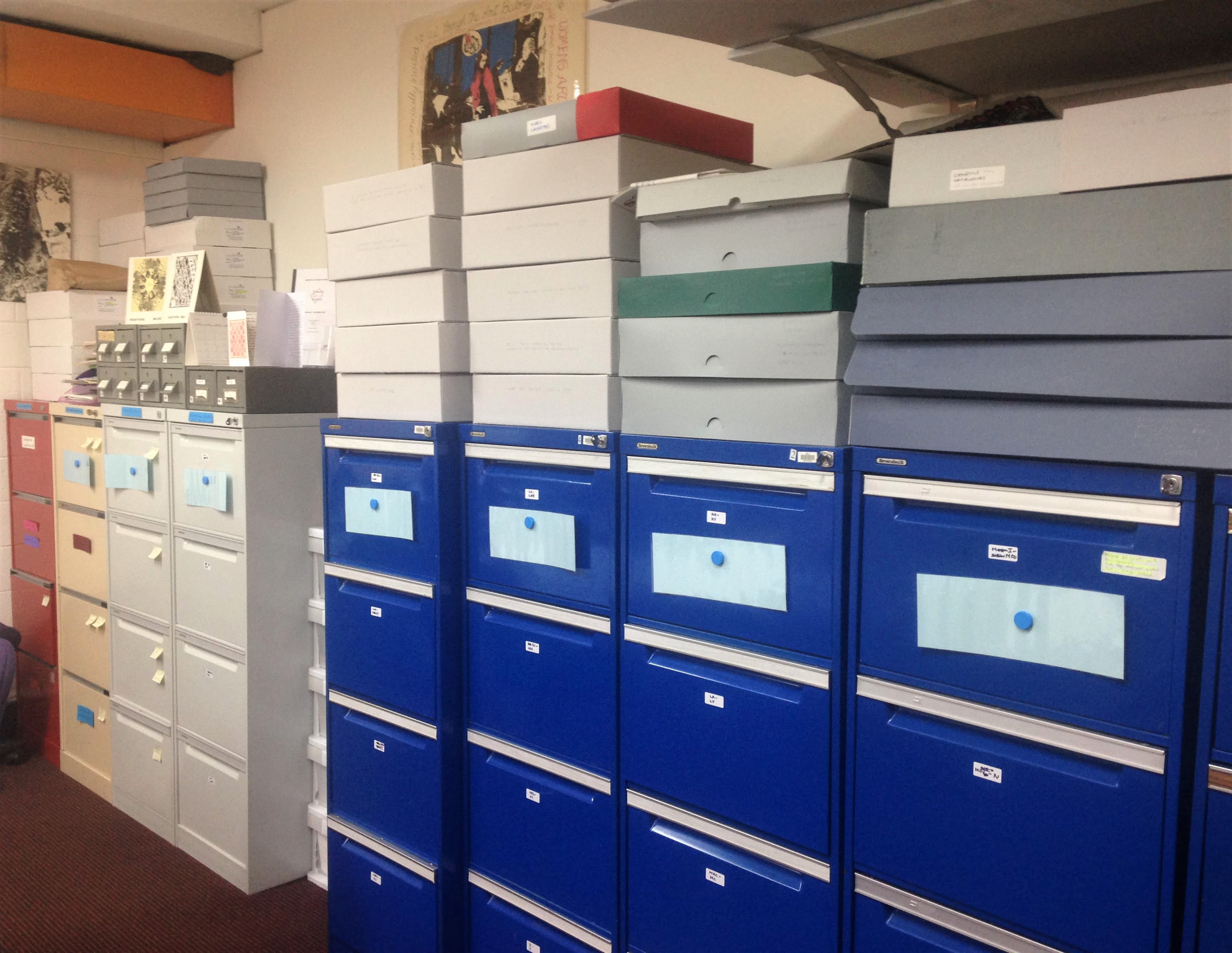
Artists files, Women's Art Register

The Women's Art Register collection now contains 12500 slides and approximately 4000 artist and subject folders - representing over 5000 artists - along with a substantial library of books, exhibition catalogues, magazines and a small collection of posters and ephemera. The collection was assessed as a Collection of National Significance through the Heritage Collections Council, (now known as the Collections Council of Australia), in 2009. The conservation and collection management is undertaken by a voluntary Committee of Management, along with a team of regular volunteers who are artists, students, archivists, conservators, librarians and academics. The archive is available to curators, students, institutions and the general public, to conduct research, assisted by volunteers where needed.

The Women's Art Register has been supported by the City of Yarra for over 40 years. This partnership provides affordable space rental and in-kind support, without which the archive may not have survived. The Women's Art Register's band of trained volunteers produces a range of regular workshops and public programming to support their members, engage with local communities, share the collection and advocate on behalf of Australian women artists. Articles and publications have been continually collected, collated and filed for access by the public, and new submissions of documentation from contemporary women artists and their exhibitions continue to be received. In 1978 the first catalogue of holdings within the Women’s Art Register was published. Regular updates were published until the most recent print publication was produced in 1999. The catalogue is now moving online.

== Publications ==
The Women's Art Register published its first Women's Art Register Bulletin in April, 1988. The Bulletin initially kept the members informed of art events, news and analysis by peers. It now operates as a journal style art magazine, with regular Guest Editors and themed issues. Artist and committee member Pat Hillcoat's notable column A Look At Books informed members of international events, publications and issues pertinent to leading feminist art contexts, for many years. The Women's Art Register website was launched in 1995 and an online mapping project This Is WAR! was launched in 2021, exploring sites of women's art practice and sharing archival materials from the collection.

In 2022 to support a program educating artists about estate planning, the Women's Art Register produced Leaving your legacy: A guide for Australian artists, written by Caroline Phillips.

To recognise the 50 year anniversary of the Women's Art Register, Melbourne University Press released a scholarly anthology, Keeping things together: 50 years of the Women's Art Register. This was edited by Merren Ricketson, Anna Daly and Sahra Martin.

== Public programs ==
The Women’s Art Register runs a range of programs for professional development and sharing the archive. Programs include workshops, Wikipedia editing, exhibitions, discussion forums and online projects. Each year for International Women’s Day they host Art+Feminism Wikipedia Edit-a-thon that improved coverage of women artists on Wikipedia.

== Exhibitions and events ==
1975 September 21 First showing of slides from the Women's Art Register during Janine Burke’s exhibition Women Artists: One Hundred Years, 1840-1940 at the George Paton Gallery.

1978 Profile of Australian Women Artists: 1860 - 1960, by Bonita Ely and Anna Sande.

1988 The Women's Dinner: a celebratory dinner with 1200 women attendees - in honour of Judy Chicago - to accompany the exhibition of Chicago's The Dinner Party at Melbourne's Royal Exhibition Building

1993 Can't See For Lookin', Koorie Women Artists Educating: a collaborative project between local Koorie women artists, the Victorian Aboriginal Education Association Inc. and the Women's Art Register. The exhibition, held at the National Gallery of Victoria Access Gallery, included works by 12 Koorie artists: Connie Hart, Karen Casey, Destiny Deacon, Ellen Jose, Leah King-Smith, Donna Leslie, Rachel Mullett, Maree Clarke, Treahna Hamm, Lisa Kennedy, Kerri Kruse and Gayle Maddigan. The exhibition was accompanied by extensive public programming and resources including a slide kit, school programs for teachers and students, a concert in the Great Hall featuring Koorie musicians and performers, free entry to the NGV for all Koories and work experience placements for Koorie students.

1995 Bias Binding: Women's Art Register 1975-1995: an exhibition to celebrate the 20th anniversary of the Women's Art Register, at the National Gallery of Victoria Access Gallery. Presented as part of the National Women's Art Exhibition, conceived by Joan Kerr.

2004 Genetics: a Women's Art Register members exhibition at Horti Hall.

2015 AS IF: 40 Years and Beyond Celebrating the Women’s Art Register: a mini-festival produced by Sally Northfield, including exhibitions and public programming conceived and curated by Danielle Hakim, Caroline Phillips, Juliette Peers, Stephanie Leigh, SlideNIGHT, Gail Stiffe, Rosemary Mangiamele, Emily Castle and Rosa Tato. Winner of Best Visual Art Event at the 2016 Melbourne Fringe Festival.

2018 Conspicuous Presence: Trocadero Art Space, International Women's Day Guest Curator Program. Exhibition curated by Caroline Phillips and Juliette Peers. Artists: Georgia MacGuire, Khi-Lee Thorpe, Sofi Basseghi, Su Yang, Ema Shin in Gallery and material from the archive of the Women’s Art Register.

2019 Re-Register: Australian Women Sculptors From The Women’s Art Register exhibition catalogue to accompany the Inaugural Women's Art Register Artist-In-Residence exhibition at the Richmond Town Hall and Richmond Library. Works by Julia Boros, with accompanying archival materials from the Women's Art Register, and catalogue essays by Katve-Kaisa Kontturi, Bonita Ely and Anna Sande.

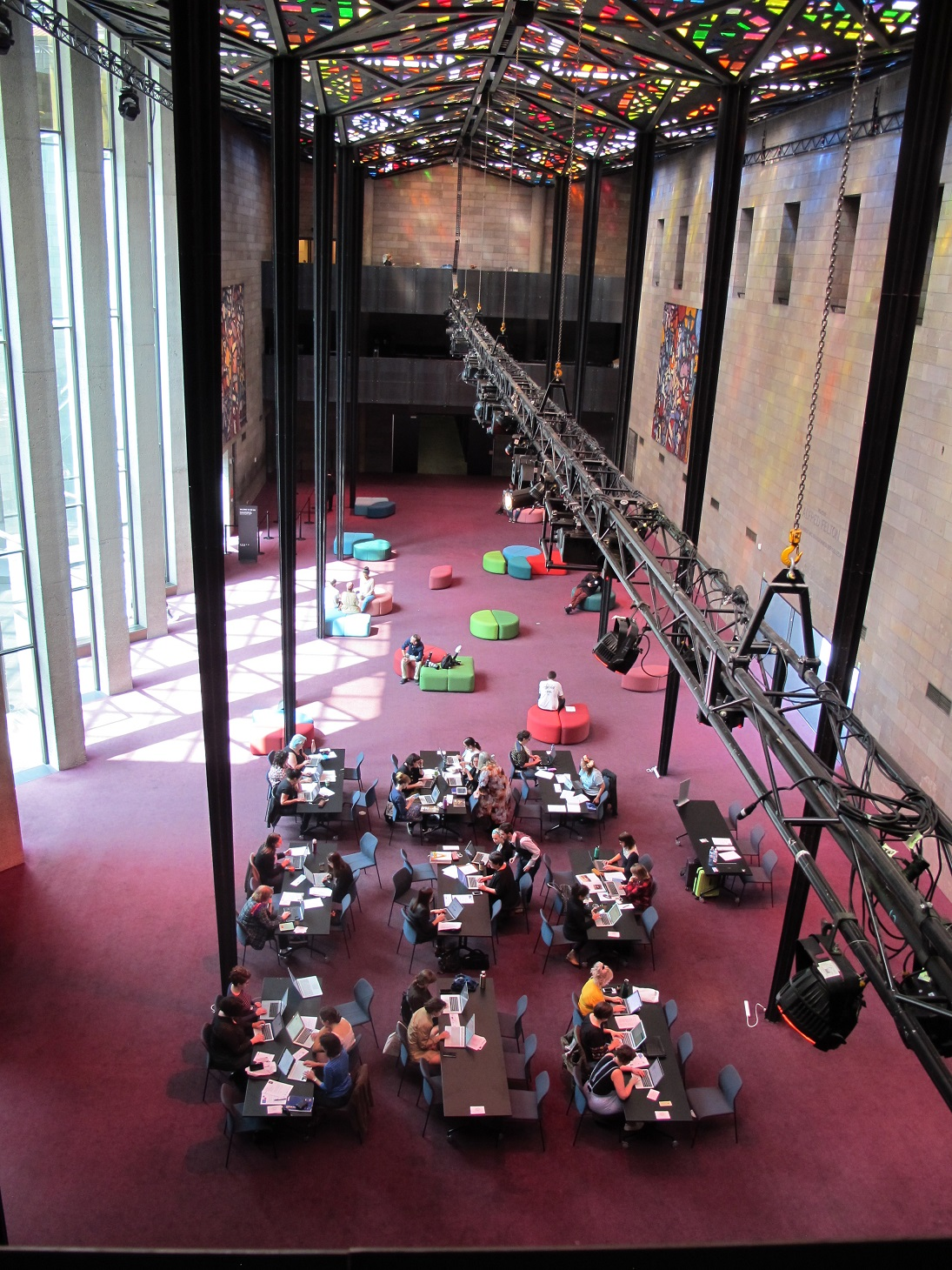
Art+Feminism/Know My Name Wikipedia Edit-a-thon NGV Great Hall IWD 2020

2020 International Women's Day Art+Feminism Wikipedia Edit-a-thon: the fourth Art +Feminism event hosted by the Women's Art Register, in collaboration with Art+Feminism, Know My Name, Wikimedia Australia and WikiD: women, Wikipedia, design. Held in The Great Hall, National Gallery of Victoria.

2021 This is WAR!: Online map of sites of women's art practice. Designed by Sahra Martin.

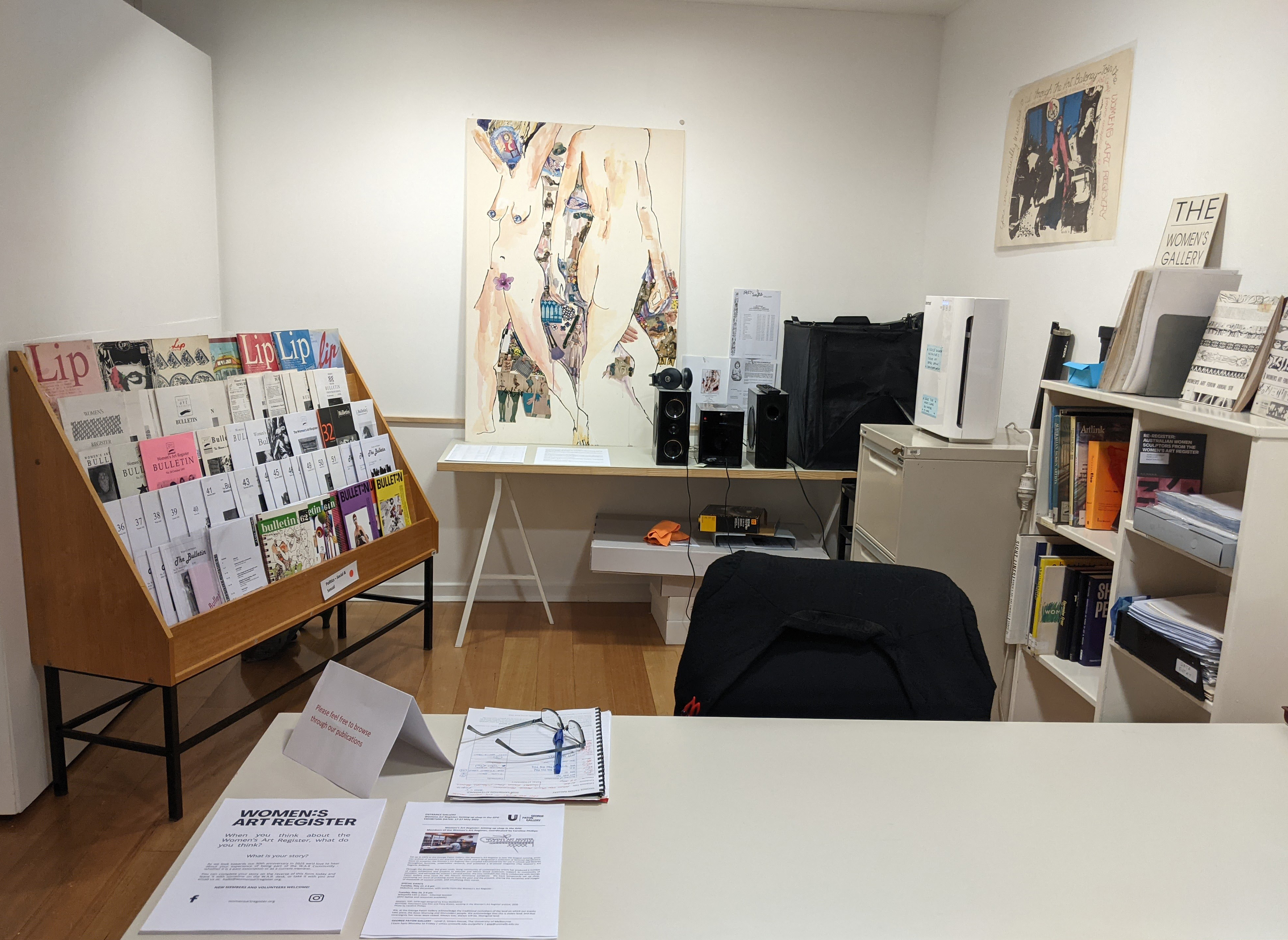
Installation view of Women's Art Register: Setting up shop in the GPG May 2022

2022 Setting up Shop at the GPG in conjunction with When you think about feminism, what do you think? George Paton Gallery: Feminisms 1975-2022 Curated by Emma Shaw and Sandie Bridie. As the final exhibition in the George Paton Gallery's Union House location at the University of Melbourne, these exhibitions looked at the history of feminist engagement in the activities of the gallery from the 1970s to 2022.

2024 International Women's Day Art+Feminism Wikipedia Edit-a-thon: the seventh Art +Feminism event hosted by the Women's Art Register, in collaboration with Art+Feminism, Know My Name, Wikimedia Australia and WikiD: women, Wikipedia, design. Held in The Richmond Library, Victoria.

2025 Landmarks 75/25: 50 years of the Women’s Art Register. An exhibition celebrating the fiftieth anniversary of the Women's Art Register at the George Paton Gallery in March.

== Residencies ==
Artist in Residence are appointed annually

- 2024 Gail Harradine, Wotjobaluk visual artist, curator and teacher
- 2025 Kate Just

== See also ==
- Women's Art Movement
