= George Paton Gallery =

Art gallery at University of Melbourne

Coordinates: 37.79858°S 144.96289°E

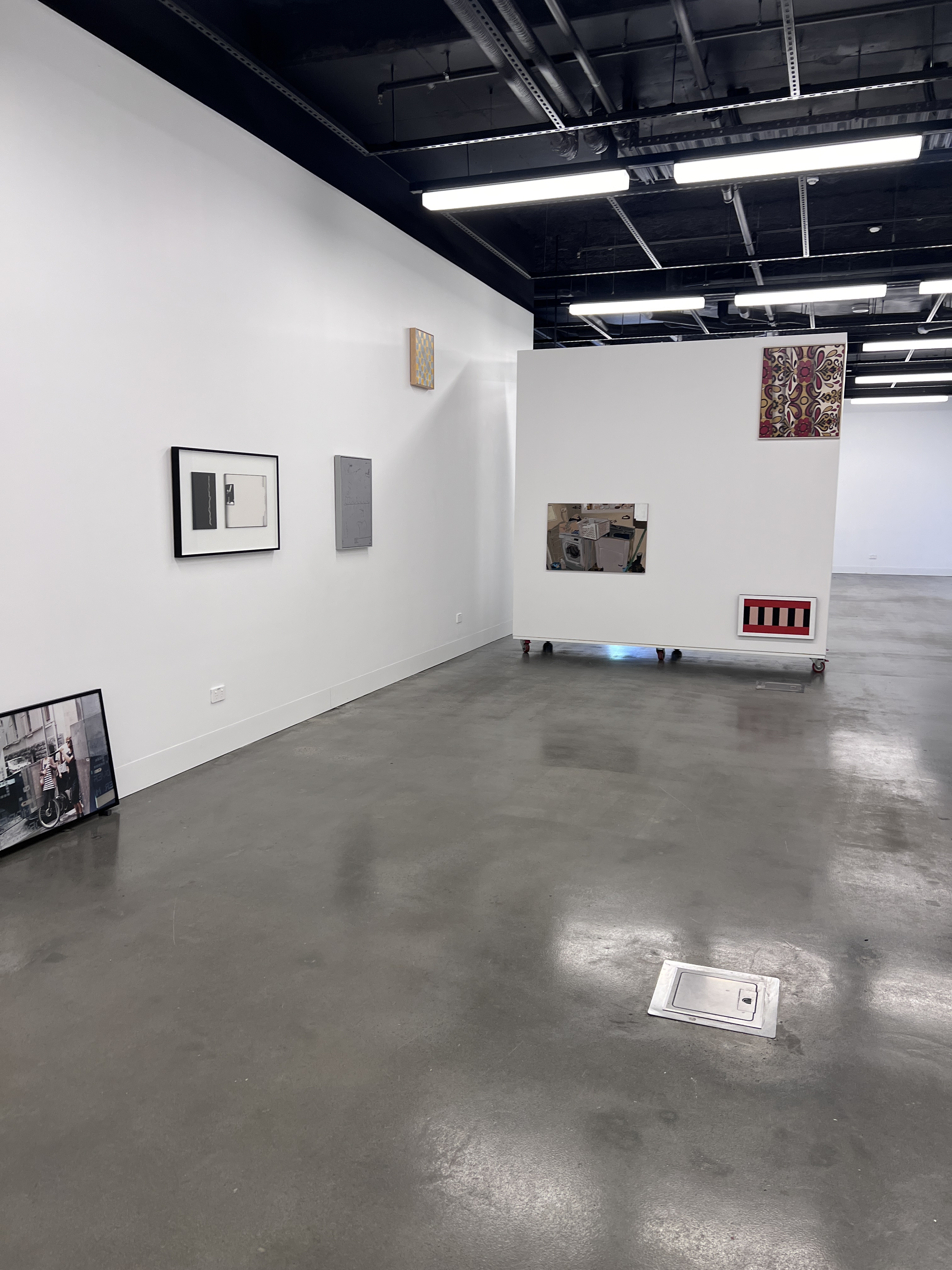
Exhibition image from UMSU Art Collection: New Acquisitions and selected works curated by Channon Goodwin and Ellie Thomas. 19 Feb - 1 March 2024.

The George Paton Gallery is the first institutionally supported experimental art space in Australia. Established in 1975 as the Ewing and George Paton Gallery, it is run by the University of Melbourne Student Union, on the University of Melbourne Parkville Campus. In 2022, the gallery relocated from its longstanding space at Union House to the purpose-built Arts and Cultural Building.

== History ==
The George Paton Gallery was the central hub for experimental art in Australia in the 1970s and early 1980s. As well as presenting diverse and challenging exhibitions, it fostered a strong community of creative discourse through film screenings, poetry readings, performance events and hosting meetings by marginalised groups of artists and activists. Early influential exhibitions that cement the radical nature of the gallery's first decade include Janine Burke's Australian women artists: One hundred years, 1840–1940 presented in 1975, and "The Letter Show", presented in 1974, curated by founding Directors Kiffy Rubbo and Meredith Rogers.

Later Directors developed their reputations as influential curators in the gallery, including Judy Annear, who went on to be the founding Director of Artspace in Sydney and curator of Australian Perspecta, 1995; Denise Robinson, who became Director of the Australian Centre for Photography; and Juliana Engberg, who has been Director of the Australian Centre for Contemporary Art, Melbourne, artistic director of the Biennale of Sydney 2014: You Imagine What You Desire, and program director for Aarhus, Denmark in the 2017 European Capital of Culture program.

Considered Australia's first experimental art space with continuous public funding, including, in 1985, $58,000 from the University of Melbourne Student Union, $11,000 from the Australia Council, $3,000 from the Victorian Ministry for the Arts, and $1,000 from the Myer Foundation. It became the subject of discontent about its relevance within the University student body that supported it, and consequently the Union funding ceased at the end of 1990. The Ian Potter Museum of Art now houses the Ewing Collection. The George Paton Gallery reopened in 1994, continuing as a contemporary art gallery with a focus on the development of young artists, supporting emerging practices and research.

== Directors ==
- 1972–1980: Kiffy Rubbo
- April 1980 – May 1982: Judy Annear
- May 1982 – Jan 1986: Denise Robinson
- Feb 1986 – 1989: Juliana Engberg
- 1990: Stuart Koop

== Artists ==
Each year the gallery acquires a selection of works via commission and from graduate exhibitions, including from the Victorian College of the Arts. The artists who have shown work at George Paton Gallery include many notable Australian artists including Elizabeth Gower, Jill Orr, Bonita Ely, Natasha Johns-Messenger, Micky Allan, Maria Kozic, Pat Brassington, Aleks Danko, Fiona Hall, and Jenny Watson.

Newly acquired works feature annually in an exhibition alongside a selection of works from the collection. The 2024 exhibition, ‘UMSU Art Collection: New Acquisitions and Selected Works’ ran from 19 February 2024 - 1 March 2024. The show was curated by Channon Goodwin and Ellie Thomas and included new acquisitions by Grace Chander, Britt Salt and Lachlan Stonehouse, with works from the collection including Astrid Mulder, Kenneth Suico, Noni Drew, David Glaubitz, Jenni Walker, Kaijern Koo and Guy Grabowsky.

== Feminist legacy ==
Founding Directors Kiffy Rubbo and Meredith Rogers played a leading role in developing George Paton Gallery as a feminist art space. The gallery has made a significant contribution to the women's art movement through the establishment of the Women's Art Register and through seminal lectures on women in the arts given by leading figures including Mary Kelly, Lucy Lippard, and Laura Mulvey. The legacy of the women's art movement and its associated activities at the George Paton Gallery is outlined by Janine Burke as a revolution of art, politics, experimentation and activism. The environment at the gallery fostered the emergence of key feminist organisations and publications including the Women's Art Register, Lip magazine, Art Almanac and the Women's Art Forum.

== Selected exhibitions ==
- 2022 - When you think about feminism, what do you think? George Paton Gallery, Feminisms 1975–2022, 16-27 May 2022. The last exhibition held in the Union House gallery space, the exhibition was curated by Sandra Bridie and Emma Shaw with Caroline Phillips.
- 1980 - Women At Work - A week of women's performance. In June 1980 a series of performances, seminars, slide shows, discussions and video screenings was held at Union House, University of Melbourne, including in outdoor and indoor public spaces, the Union theatre spaces and in the George Paton Gallery. Artists included Jill Orr, Anne Marsh, Cath Cherry, Bonita Ely, Ann Fogarty, Joan Grounds, Jan Hunter, Jane Kent, Vineta Lagzdina, Jackie Lawes, Anna Paci, Liz Paterson and the Wimmins Circus.
