= Erica McGilchrist =

Australian artist (1926–2014)

Erica McGilchrist OAM (10 February 1926 – 9 May 2014) was an Australian artist and co-founder of the Women's Art Register. She participated in more than 40 solo exhibitions and many group exhibitions. She is represented in institutional and public galleries as well as private collections in Australia, UK, Israel and USA. Her contributions to women's art were recognised in 1992 when she was awarded the Medal of the Order of Australia.

== Biography ==
McGilchrist was born on 10 February 1926 in Mt Gambier, South Australia. She took classes and danced with Les Ballets Contemporains in Adelaide and later with the Modern Dance Company in Melbourne. Paralleling this interest were the Saturday art classes which she began at the age of ten and continued for ten years at the SA School of Arts and Crafts. In 1946 she graduated from Adelaide Teachers College, but within two years had given up teaching to go to Melbourne to dance.

Soon art won out over dance and she held her first of many exhibitions in 1951. She held the first art therapy sessions at Kew Mental Hospital in the early 1950s. She also painted sets and costumes for the Ballet Guild. She attended part-time art classes at RMIT1952–55. In 1960–61 McGilchrist pursued postgraduate work in Munich at the Akademie der Bildenden Kunste due to a grant from AGNSW Dyason Bequest. She then held exhibitions in Munich and London.

With the advent of second wave feminism in the mid seventies Erica was at the forefront of promoting and recording women's art. She was a co-founder of Women's Art Register and served as convenor from 1978 to 1989.

== Works ==
McGilchrist worked across various media including works on paper, embroidery and paintings. Her works can be seen in the following collections:

- National Gallery of Victoria
- Art Gallery of New South Wales
- Heide Museum of Modern Art

== Awards and commissions ==
Her work has often received recognition:

- 1950s: shared the Adelaide Advertiser prize for Contemporary Art
- 1958: Awarded the Helena Rubinstein Mural Prize; her mural was installed at the Women's University College in Melbourne
- 1960s: chosen for a postage stamp design
- 1969: Commissioned by the Victorian Ministry of the Arts to decorate a tram.
- 1970: 30-minute film by ABC about retrospective of her work at University of Western Australia
- 1992: Received the Medal of the Order of Australia for her contributions to women's art

== Exhibitions ==
Erica held more than 40 solo exhibitions and participated in many group exhibitions across Australia.

1995: She was part of the curatorial team of 'Bias Binding': Women's Art Register exhibition at the National Gallery of Victoria. Other members included Jennifer Phipps, Merren Ricketson and Juliette Peers

1995: major retrospective at Caulfield Arts Complex

2014: retrospective at Heide Museum of Modern Art.
