= Second Sight (novel) =

1986 novel by Australian writer Janine Burke

- Author: Janine Burke
- Language: English
- Genre: Fiction
- Publisher: Greenhouse Publications
- Publication date: 1986
- Publication place: Australia
- Media type: Print
- Pages: 120 pp.
- ISBN: 0864360436
- Preceded by: Speaking
- Followed by: Company of Images

Second Sight (1986) is a novel by Australian writer Janine Burke. It was originally published by Greenhouse Publications in Australia in 1986.

== Critical reception ==
Marion Halligan, writing in The Canberra Times, compared this novel with the author's first and found this to be a "sharper, briefer, more elliptical narrative, the story of one woman encountering death and depression, and weathering the experience, largely through the intervention of a magically mysterious couple who carry her off to Tuscany." Halligan concluded that the author "can use words with the sharpness and freshness and immediacy of an Impressionist painting..It is this liveliness, and not the portentousness of death, doom, despair, that gives us glimpses of the real writer that Janine Burke is in the process of becoming."

== Publication history ==
After its original publication in 1986 in Australia by publisher Greenhouse Publications the novel was later reprinted as follows:

- Untapped, Australian, 2021

== Awards ==
- Victorian Premier's Literary Awards, winner 1987

== See also ==
- 1986 in Australian literature
