= Pat Hillcoat =

Australian artist and nurse (1935–2022)

Patricia Ellen Hillcoat (née Hazel), known more commonly as Pat Hillcoat (14 January 1935 – 26 October 2022), was an Australian nurse, feminist, activist and artist specialising in watercolours and collage. Her work exploring themes of the body, advertising, sexuality and political activism featured in solo exhibitions in Canada and Australia.

== Early life and education ==
Hillcoat was born in Redland Bay, Queensland, Australia in 1935 to Richard George Hazel and Kathleen Elizabeth Hazel. She graduated in Nursing from the Brisbane General Hospital in 1956, where she also met her husband Dr. Brian Leslie Hillcoat. From 1965 to 1978, the Hillcoats moved successively to Canberra, United States, Canada and the United Kingdom. While in Canada Hillcoat studied art at the Dundas Valley School of Art from 1968 to 1971, graduating in 1972. Hillcoat was part of the university community of Yale, and later McMaster. It is during this time that Hillcoat was inspired by and participated in the North American women's movements which would go on to influence her artistic work. These movements were active in feminism, civil rights, black power, and protests against the Vietnam War. Hillcoat went on to open her own studio, and in the late 1970s the family returned to Melbourne, Australia, where Brian was appointed Director of Cancer Medicine at the Peter MacCallum Hospital. The Hillcoats had four children, including film director John Hillcoat.

== Career ==
Hillcoat's feminism and political activism continued in Australia where she stared down conservative Senator Brian Harradine on the steps of Parliament, who was working to limit abortion and women’s access to care. Her activism extended to justice for Indigenous peoples, and her submission to the Senate Standing Committee on Religion and Freedom in 2000 which decried violations of Indigenous spirituality by Australian governments, and “the failure by non-Indigenous Australians to grant fair and just title and access to Indigenous people”, was well-cited in the final report.

On 29 August 1988, four artists' studios and a flat were destroyed by fire, with the entire building burning down near Queens Bridge Street, South Melbourne (now Southbank). The site also housed the photographic studios of Ross Bird and Polly Borland (married to Hillcoat's son John). Hillcoat had taken many of her works to be photographed at Bird's studio in the weeks prior and they were all lost in the fire. In 1989, Hillcoat produced and exhibited a series of works made as a direct response to the fire titled Little Sisters in Memorium.

Hillcoat was on the Women's Art Register committee and contributed to the Bulletin magazine with a regular column 'A Look at Books' which ran from 1988 until 2001.

Hillcoat died on 26 October 2022 in Melbourne at the age of 87.

== Exhibitions ==
=== Solo exhibitions ===
- August 1985, Down Under Among the Women, Judith Pugh Gallery, North Melbourne
- March 1989, Little Sisters in Memorium, Sweet Jamaique, Richmond, Melbourne
- June-July 1989, 2 Big Sisters, 9 Little Sisters, Caulfield Arts Complex, Melbourne
- May-June 1990, She-Devils & Lady Killers, The Women's Gallery, Fitzroy, Melbourne. Work dealing with the harmful effects of smoking for women, funded by grants from Quit Victoria and the Victorian Health Promotion Foundation.
- March 1994, Cut It Out, Tilley's Devine Cafe Gallery, Canberra
- March 1994, The Choice is Yours, Australian Women's Health Network, Canberra
- July 1994, Over Her Dead Body, aGOG (australian Girls Own Gallery), Canberra
- March 1999, What R We?, Tilley's Devine Cafe Gallery, Canberra

=== Group exhibitions ===
- September 1981, Open Windows, Closed Doors, LaTrobe University, Melbourne
- October 1981, The Melbourne Society of Women Painters & Sculptors, Victorian Artists' Society Gallery
- July 1982, Women's Images, Prahran Gallery, Victoria College, Melbourne
- March 1983, Women's Week Exhibition, RMIT, Melbourne
- April 1984, Feminist Art Exhibition, Visibility Gallery, Carlton, Melbourne
- March 1986, Phillip Island Arts Council Exhibition
- August 1986, Women's Art Register Exhibition & Auction, Melbourne
- September 1988, Women's Art Register Exhibition & Auction, Melbourne
- October 1988, Oculos 10th Annual Acquisitive Exhibition, Melbourne
- March 1991, Joining Forces, 2nd International Women's Day exhibition, The Women's Gallery, Fitzroy, Melbourne
- September-October 1995, The Republic - Re:public vain glory or vision’, The Women's Gallery, Fitzroy, Melbourne
- December 1995, The Last Christmas Show, The Women's Gallery, Fitzroy, Melbourne
- August 1996, Sistertrust, ANCA Gallery, Canberra
- October 1996, Australian Contemporary Art Fair, Exhibition Buildings, Melbourne
- November 1996, The Calvary Hospital Art Show, Canberra
- May 2022, When you think about feminism, what do you think? George Paton Gallery, Feminisms 1975–2022, George Paton Gallery, University of Melbourne: Art & Cultural Building, Parkville, Melbourne. A retrospective of Little Sisters in Memorium (1989) among other feminist works.
