= Monash Art, Design and Architecture =

Art school at Monash University

Coordinates: 37°52′36″S 145°02′38″E

Monash Art, Design and Architecture (MADA), also known as the Faculty of Art, Design & Architecture at Monash University, undertakes teaching and research in the areas of fine art, design, architecture, urban design and curation. Created from the Monash University College of Art and Design and formerly known as the Faculty of Art and Design, it is located at the Caulfield Campus.

== History ==
In 1993, John Redmond joined Monash University as Director of Monash University College of Art and Design, and was appointed founding Dean of the new Faculty of Art and Design in 1998.

In 2008, the Faculty launched a new course in architecture, the first new architecture course in Australia for 30 years, resulting in the faculty being renamed the Faculty of Art, Design and Architecture. Shane Murray was appointed as the foundation professor of architecture. Professor Murray became the dean of the Faculty of Art, Design & Architecture in 2011, and Dr Diego Ramirez-Lovering was appointed as head of architecture. In 2018, Professor Naomi Stead was appointed head of architecture, and Professor Carl Grodach was appointed founding professor of Urban Planning and Design.

In 2021, Professor Mel Dodd joined Monash Art, Design and Architecture as Head of Architecture from Central Saint Martins, UAL. During her tenure, Associate Professor Catherine Murphy became the new program director of the Master of Urban Planning and Design.

In 2022, Associate Professor Spiros Panigirakis was appointed Head of Fine Art, a position previously held by Professor Kathy Temin.

In 2023, Professor Shane Murray stepped down as Dean of Monash Art, Design and Architecture. Professor Mel Dodd was appointed Interim Dean, and was confirmed in the role in July 2024. In March 2025, a new Head of Architecture at Monash was announced - Professor Erik L'Heureux joined in July 2025 from the National University Singapore.

== Description ==
Monash is one of few institutions in Australia to offer a range of these disciplines within the one faculty.

The Faculty is located at Monash University's Caulfield Campus and incorporates:

- Department of Fine Art - Current Head of Fine Art is Associate Professor Spiros Panigirakis
- Department of Design - Current Head of Design is Professor Gene Bawden
- Department of Architecture - Current Head of Architecture is Professor Erik L'Heureux

Also at the Caulfield campus is Monash University Museum of Art (MUMA) and the MADA Gallery.

The faculty's academic leadership team consists of:

- Professor Mel Dodd - Dean
- Associate Professor Jess Berry - Associate Dean, Graduate Research
- Dr Peta Clancy - Associate Dean, Indigenous
- Professor Nicole Kalms - Associate Dean, Research
- Associate Professor Timothy Moore - Associate Dean, Engagement
- Professor Diego Ramirez-Lovering - Associate Dean, International
- Professor Ari Seligman - Associate Dean, Education
