= Gail Stiffe =

Australian paper artist

- Known for: paper making
- Website: https://www.gailstiffe.info/

Gail Stiffe is an Australian artist, educator and curator with a focus on paper making and the book arts. Stiffe is known for challenging the traditional book format. She uses the pulp painting technique and takes inspiration from the Australian bush and the paper itself.

Since 1997 Stiffe has held solo exhibitions and participated in group exhibitions in Australia and overseas. She has taught papermaking in Victorian schools, conducted workshops and is the president of Papermakers of Victoria. A book of handmade papers produced by members of Papermakers of Victoria and hand bound by Stiffe is held in the National Library of Australia Collection. In 2011 Stiffe was president of the International Association of Hand Papermakers and Paper Artists (IAPMA) and has been the convenor of the Women's Art Register.

== Curation ==
Stiffe curated the exhibition Black and White Books with Anne Marie Power and Marianne Little. The exhibition was supported by the Papermakers of Victoria and Textile Fibre Forum.

== Exhibitions ==
- 2002 Natural Connections, Dragon Papers, Windsor and at Meeniyan Art Gallery, Meeniyan, Victoria
- 2006 A Passion for Paper, Studio 500, Trentham.
- 2007 Threads, Thoughts and Inspiration, Bundoora Homestead
- 2009 with Zoe Culbertson, Nesting: the necessary preparing for new life, growth and creativity as seen through alternative photographic processes on handmade paper, 69 Smith Street Gallery, Collingwood.
- 2009 Shared Journeys, Level 17 Artspace, Victoria University.
- 2009 Water-Wood-Paper, 2nd International Paper Artists Exhibition, Wonju, South Korea.
- 2022 Three Rivers with Naomi Downie and Paul Taylor, Art Gallery on Darling, Balmain NSW, Australia.
