= Stephen Benwell =

Australian ceramist

- Born: 1953 (age 72–73); Melbourne, Australia
- Education: Victorian College of the Arts Monash University
- Known for: Ceramics, Painting, Drawing
- Awards: Sidney Myer Fund Australian Ceramic Award, 2010

Stephen Benwell (born 1953) is a Melbourne-based artist working predominantly in the medium of ceramics.

== Education ==
Benwell trained as an artist in Melbourne, Australia, receiving a Diploma of Art from the Victorian College of the Arts in 1974. He went on to study ceramics under Professor Noel John Flood, attaining a Diploma of Education from Melbourne State College in 1976. In 2005, he completed his formal education with a Masters of Fine Arts from Monash University.

== Art practice ==
Through the medium of ceramics, Stephen Benwell seeks to challenge local and international pottery traditions and art-craft context. Aesthetically, his work marries studio-based investigations of the ceramicist with the painterly and sculptural concerns of the contemporary artist. It manifests in how he couples high art with low art or low culture.

== Exhibitions and collections ==
Stephen Benwell has exhibited consistently since 1975. His work has been exhibited in over 30 solo and over 60 group shows. He is represented by LON Gallery in Richmond, Victoria and exhibits his work often throughout Australia and Internationally, in both commercial and public galleries. His work was exhibited as part of Australian Contemporary at SOFA Art & Design, in Chicago, Craft from Scratch: 8th Triennale (Australia and Germany) at the Museum of Applied Art, Frankfurt, Australian Glass and Ceramic Art at Galerie Ursula Rosenhauer in Germany, and A Secret History of Blue and White, which travelled throughout Asia between 2006 and 2009 through funding from Asialink. In 2013, Benwell's ceramic work from 1970 onwards was exhibited in a major retrospective entitled Stephen Benwell: Beauty, Anarchy, Desire – A Retrospective at the Heide Museum of Modern Art. Benwell's work is also represented in a number of prolific permanent collections, including the National Gallery of Australia, Canberra; the National Gallery of Victoria, Melbourne; the Art Gallery of South Australia, Adelaide; the Art Gallery of Western Australia, Perth; the Queensland Art Gallery, Brisbane; the Tasmanian Museum and Art Gallery, Hobart; and the Victoria and Albert Museum, London.

== Awards ==
Throughout his career, Stephen Benwell has been the recipient of numerous awards, grants and residencies. Examples of his accomplishments include the Sidney Myer Fund Australian Ceramic Award, awarded by the Shepparton Art Gallery, in 1992, 1994, 1995, 1996 and 2010. In 2009 he received the inaugural Deakin University Contemporary Small Sculpture Award. Benwell has received several Australian Council grants, which have allowed him to travel extensively. Between 1984 and 1985 he undertook a studio residency at the Cité internationale des arts in Paris. In 2008 he traveled again, this time on a study tour of Greece.
