= Monash University Museum of Art =

Coordinates: 37.8772°S 145.0462°E

Monash University Museum of Art (MUMA)
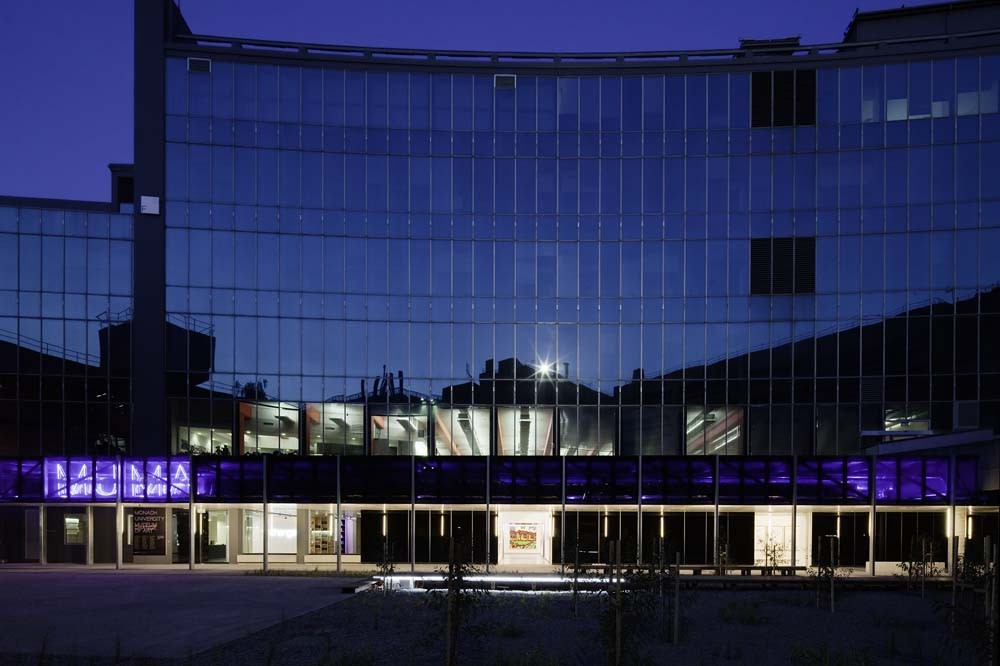
- Former names: Monash University Gallery

General information
- Type: Museum
- Architectural style: Contemporary
- Location: Caulfield East, Melbourne, Victoria
- Completed: 2010
- Governing body: Private

Design and construction
- Architect: Kerstin Thompson

Website
- www.monash.edu.au/muma/

The Monash University Museum of Art (MUMA), formerly the Monash University Gallery, is a contemporary art museum on Monash University's Caulfield campus on Dandenong Road, Melbourne, Australia.

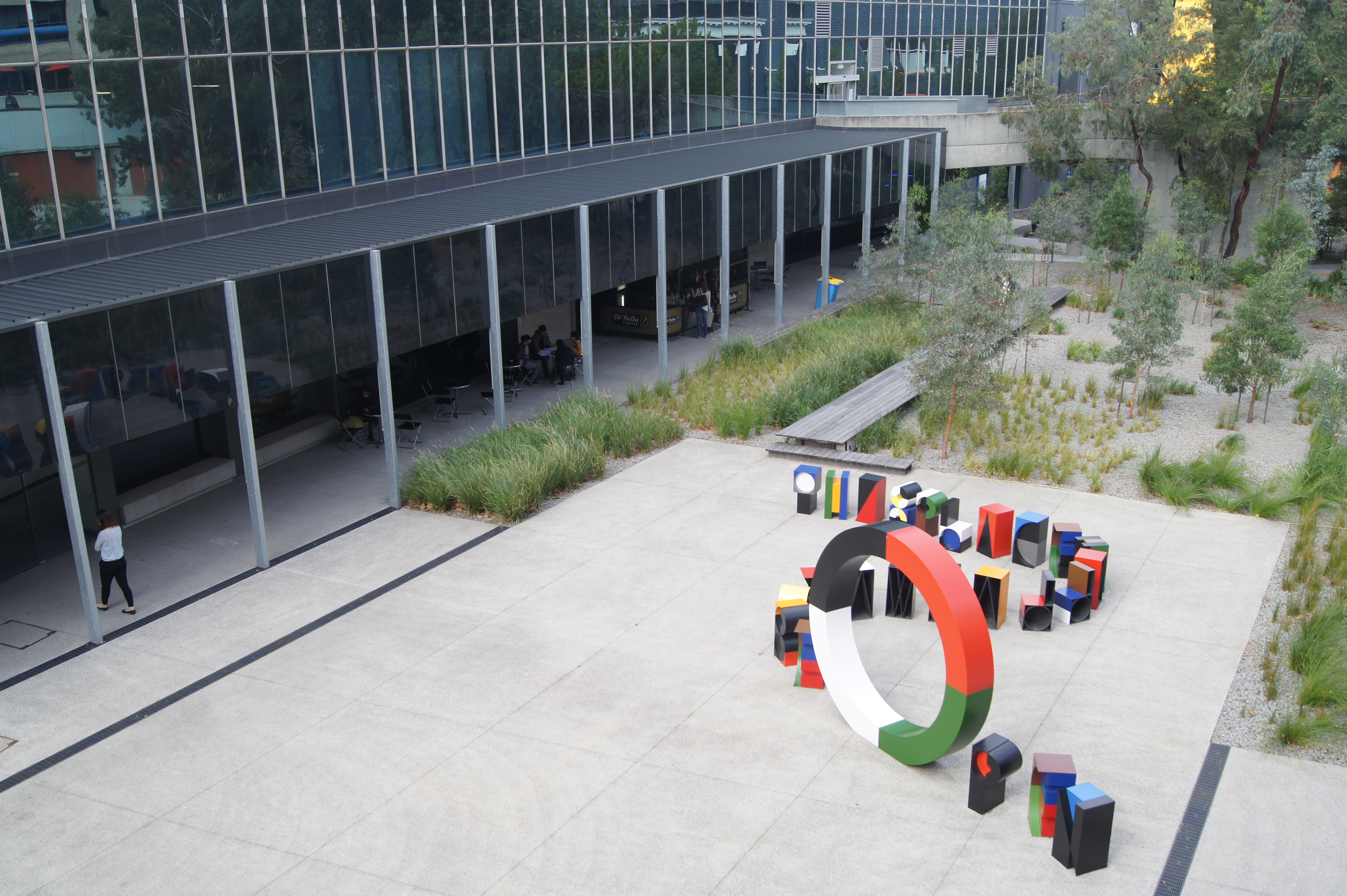
Ian Potter Sculpture Court

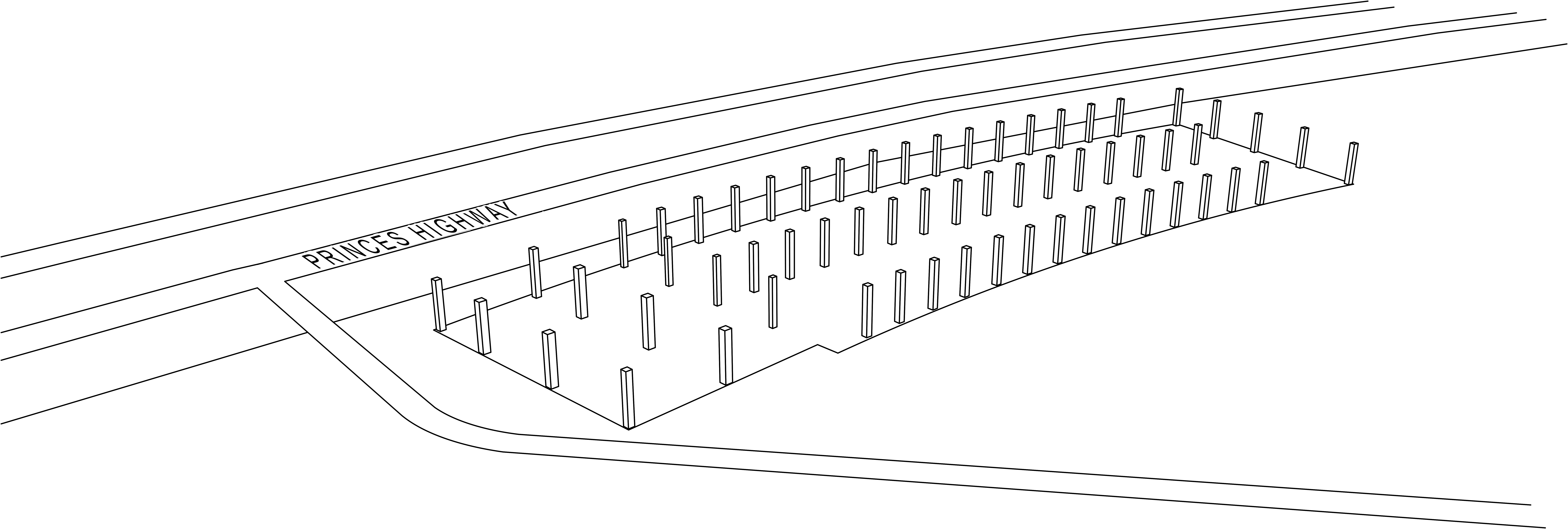
Diagram indicating the structural system

== History ==
The Museum grew out of a number of earlier initiatives at Monash University, starting in 1961 when the inaugural Vice Chancellor Louis Matheson created a fund for the purchase of artworks by then living Australian artists. The establishment of the museum reflected a desire by the university's founders to create the modern Australian university, and to enrich the cultural life of students, staff and visitors.

In the late 1960s John Waterhouse and Patrick McCaughey (then a teaching fellow at Monash and art critic at The Age) were appointed as curators, and in 1975, McCaughey created the Monash University Gallery on the seventh floor of the Menzies Building of the main campus and set up an artist-in-residence program. In the same year, Grazia Gunn was appointed as the first full-time collection curator at the university. The gallery was also referred to as the Monash University Department of Visual Arts Exhibition Gallery.

In 1987 the gallery moved to the Multi-Discipline Centre (later called the Gallery Building), and in 2002 the Gallery was renamed Monash University Museum of Art. Its collection had grown to over 1500 works by 2008.

The present building, created by extensively remodelling an existing modernist building on the Caulfield campus, was designed by Melbourne-based architect Kerstin Thompson and completed in 2010.

== Description ==
The present location at Caulfield is closer to the city and to the Faculty of Art Design & Architecture than its previous location, and the flexible design allows for exhibitions, education programs (in the Helen Macpherson Smith Education Space) and various events. There is a sculpture garden, the Ian Potter Sculpture Court.

The museum aims to support "innovative art-led models of interdisciplinary teaching, learning and research across the University". It mounts survey as well as solo exhibitions, as well as commissioning temporary public artworks in the Ian Potter Sculpture Court and permanent public art projects across all of the university's campuses. An example of this is Weelam Ngalut (Our Place), created by Quandamooka artist Megan Cope in 2109, designed to welcome students and visitors onto Kulin country.

== Collections ==
As of 2022 the gallery houses over 2,300 artworks by leading Australian contemporary artists, including artworks by Kate Beynon, Robert Rooney, Tracey Moffatt and Vivienne Binns.

== Exhibitions ==
The museum has presented a program of exhibitions focusing on contemporary Australian and international art since the 1990s.

The Monash University Gallery held an exhibition from 13 April to 18 May 1996 called Women hold up half the sky: The orientation of art in the post-war Pacific, (not to be confused with an exhibition of the same name held at the National Gallery in 1995) and published a 20-page catalogue, which included biographies of the artists whose work was exhibited, to accompany an exhibition. Vivienne Binns was one of the artists whose work was exhibited at the Monash exhibition, along with Emily Kame Kngwarreye.

== Governance ==
As of January 2022 the curator is Charlotte Day, while the advisory committee is chaired by Dean Shane Murray and includes Louise Adler and Maudie Palmer AO, founding director of the TarraWarra Museum of Art and Heide Museum of Modern Art.

== Architecture ==
The project plan had to take into consideration the placement of the original building. It is positioned between different buildings and faculties, surrounded by garden areas. Taking this into consideration, an approach that emphasised flow and connectivity was taken, described as a ‘cultural exchange’ or a continuum from internal to external. Set between two buildings on Dandenong Road is the art installation Silverscreen by Callum Morton which serves as ceremonial entry into the MUMA precinct.

=== Awards ===
- 2011 RAIA Awards: Marion Mahoney Award
- 2011 RAIA Awards: Public Alterations & Additions
- 2011 IDEA Awards: Institutional Interior Design
