= Monash University, Caulfield campus =

Coordinates: 37°52′36″S 145°02′38″E

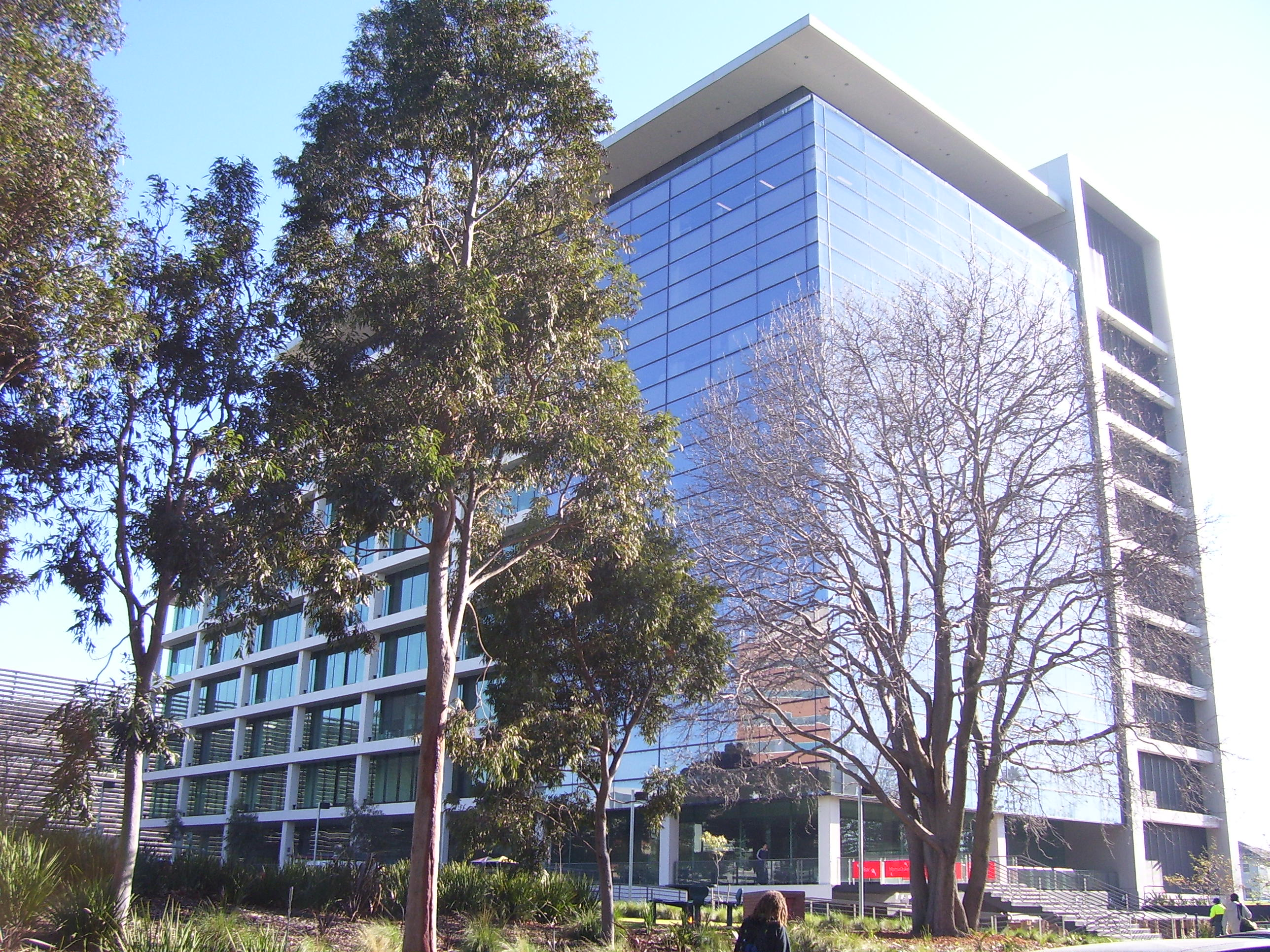
H Building on Caulfield Campus

Monash University, Caulfield campus is a campus of Monash University located in Caulfield East, which is a suburb of Melbourne, Australia, in the state of Victoria. The campus comprises 13,400 students of which 52.8% are female and 57.1% of students are enrolled in undergraduate courses. Before its incorporation into Monash University, it was the Caulfield campus of Chisholm Institute of Technology, which was created from the union of the Caulfield Institute of Technology and State College of Victoria at Frankston.

== History ==
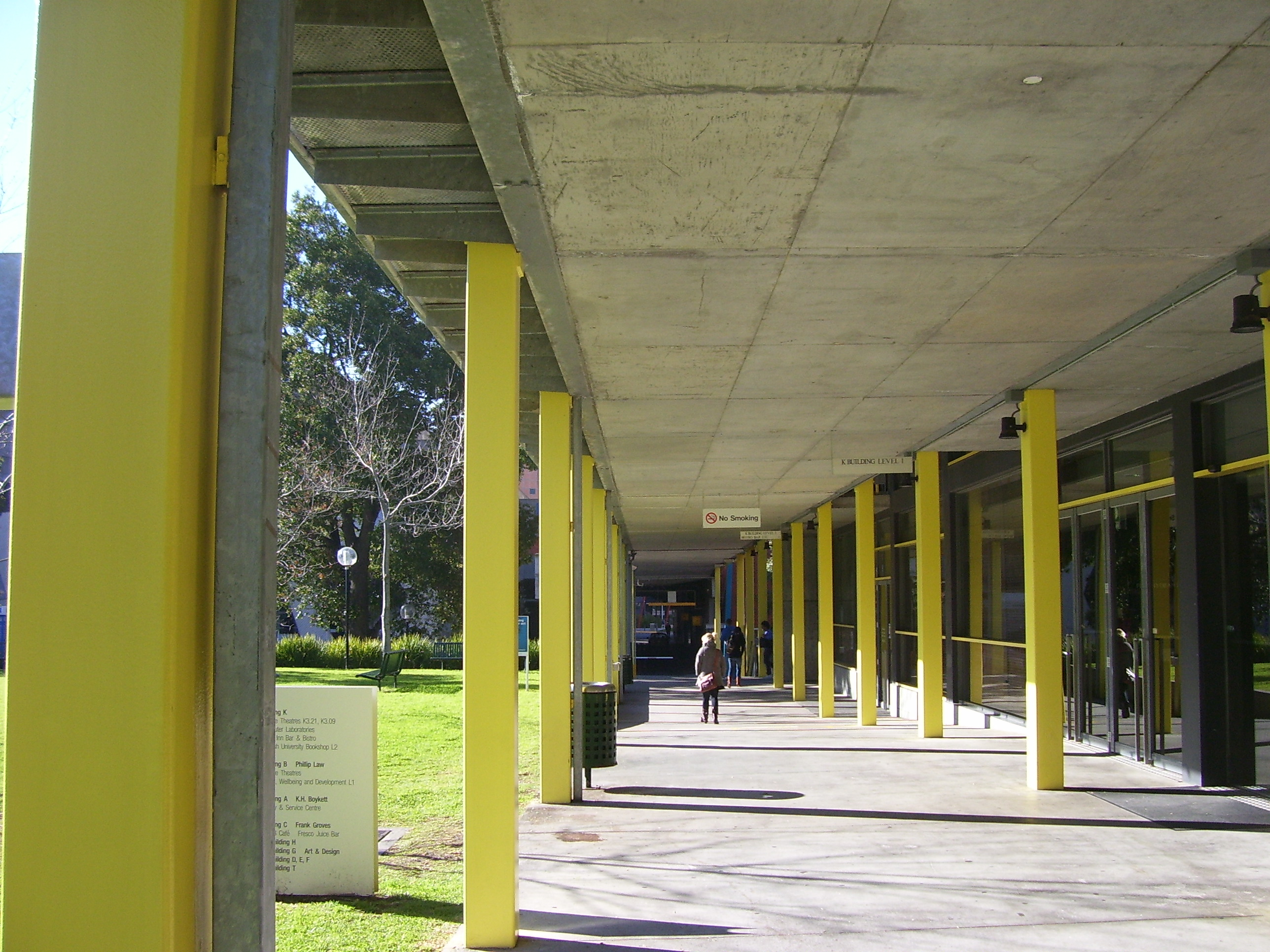
K block walkway on Caulfield Campus as seen in 2009

The campus was founded as the Caulfield Technical School in 1922, making it the second oldest campus of Monash University (after the Victorian College of Pharmacy). A Junior Technical High School was added in the 1950s, with the Technical School becoming a Senior Technical High School. They separated in 1958 with the junior school absorbed by other technical schools in the area and the senior school became Caulfield Technical College. In 1968 it became the Caulfield Institute of Technology. In 1982 the Caulfield Institute of Technology amalgamated with the State College of Victoria at Frankston to form the Chisholm Institute of Technology. This Institution merged with Monash University in 1990 and became Monash University, Caulfield campus.

== Location ==
Caulfield campus is located 10 kilometres from Melbourne's city centre on Dandenong Road (Princes Highway). The trip from Melbourne will take about 25 minutes in peak hour and 15 minutes at other times. The university is on Melbourne tram route 3 and the journey takes about 35 minutes from the city centre.

Caulfield railway station is only a hundred metres from the university and is located on the Frankston-Pakenham-Cranbourne line. Trains depart at least every 15 minutes from Flinders Street station in the Melbourne CBD during weekdays.

== Faculties at the Caulfield campus ==
The following faculties have a teaching or research presence at Caulfield Campus.

- Arts
- Monash Art Design & Architecture (MADA)
- Monash University Business and Economics Faculty
- Information Technology
- Monash University Faculty of Medicine

== Monash University Museum of Art ==
The Monash University Museum of Art has been situated on Caulfield campus since 2010, when an existing modernist building was remodelled to house it.

== Student life ==
=== Student organisations ===
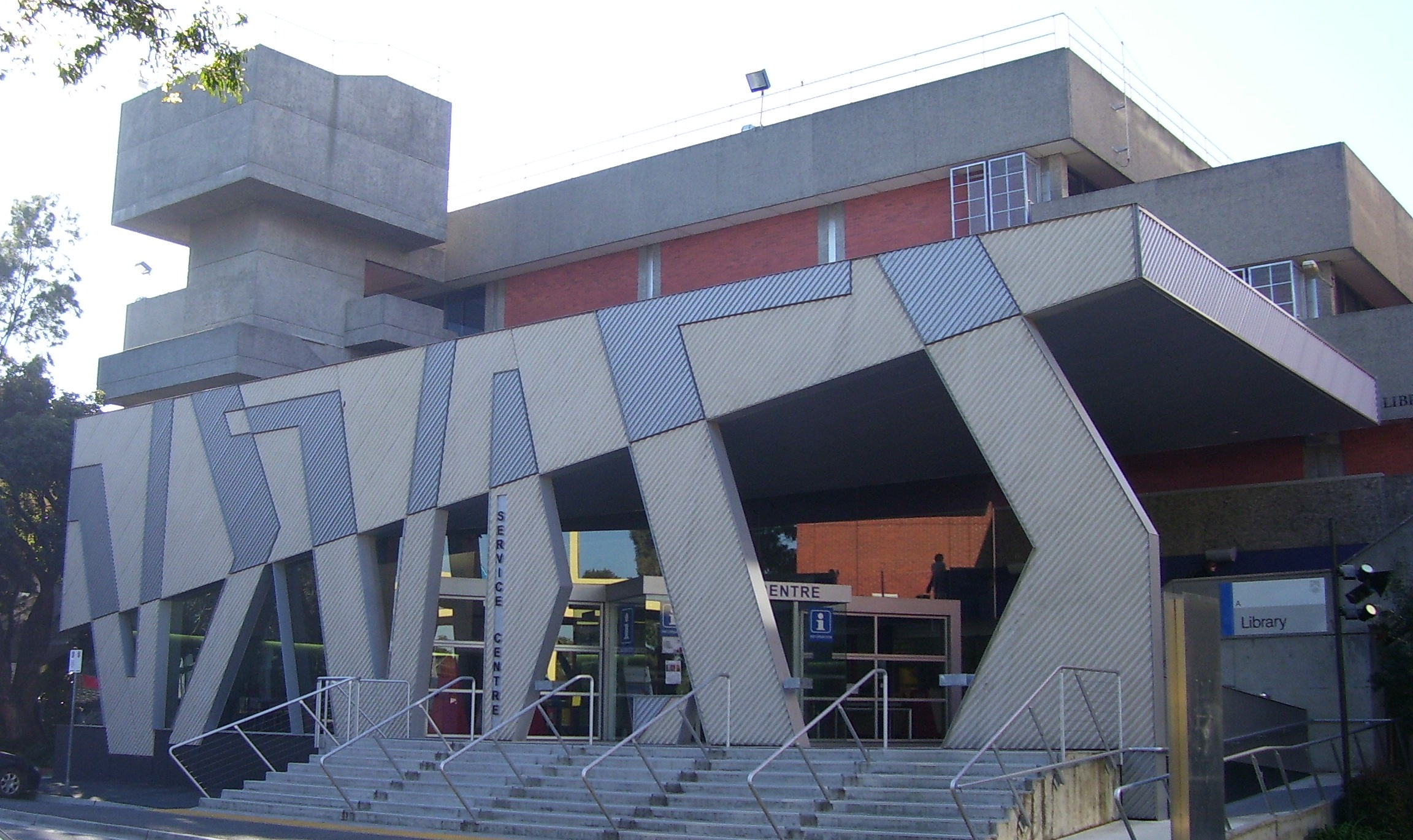
The now defunct Student Service Centre on Caulfield Campus

MONSU Caulfield (Monash Student Union) is the current name of the student union representing students at the Caulfield Campus.

Previous Student Unions organisations include:

- Caulfield Institute of Technology Students' Representative Council;
- Caulfield Institute of Technology Student Union;
- Chisholm Institute of Technology Student Union;
- MONSU Caulfield

The Business & Commerce Students' Society (BCSS) is the largest faculty based student club on campus, with over 1300 members.

The Monash Marketing Students' Society (MMSS) is the second largest academic society with just over 500 members.

The Caulfield Arts Society (CAS) is the Arts Faculty club with currently just over 300 members.
