= Meredith Rogers =

Australian theatre director and academic

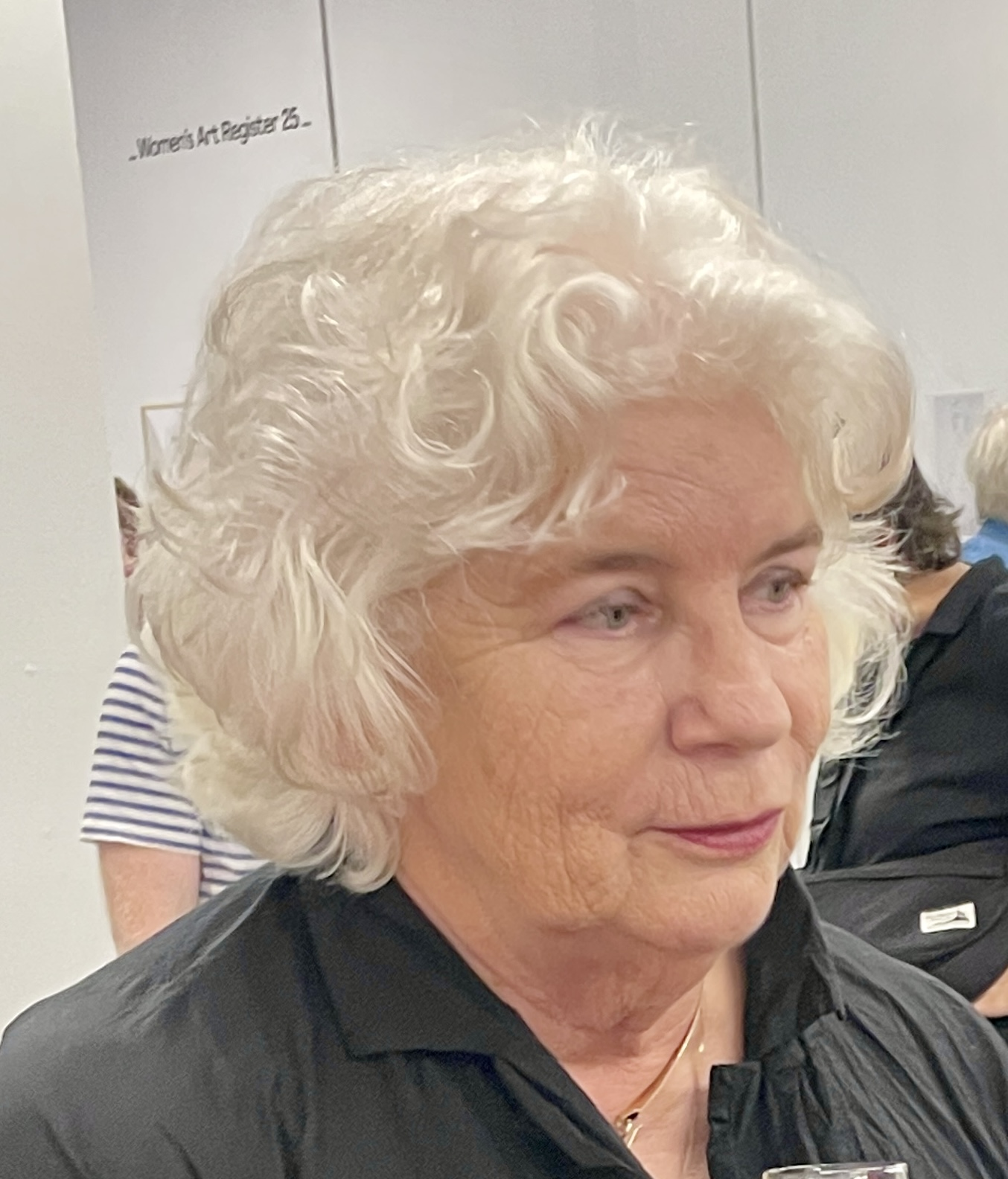
- Meredith Rogers at 50 years of the Women’s Art Register exhibition 2025
- Occupations: Theatre director, academic
- Employer: La Trobe University
- Notable work: The Mill: Experiments in Theatre and Community
- Title: Dr.
- Awards: Ewa Czjawor Memorial Award (2003)

Meredith Rogers is an Australian theatre director and academic, and has written on performance and theatremaking. Rogers is an Honorary Associate of the Humanities & Social Sciences School at La Trobe University and for over a decade has lectured in their Theatre and Drama Program.

== Background ==
Rogers was the associate director at the Ewing and George Paton Galleries (now George Paton Gallery) at the University of Melbourne Student Union from 1974 to 1979, alongside gallery director Kiffy Rubbo.

In 1975, Rogers a founding member and co-creator of the Women's Art Register slide collection, along with Erica McGilchrist, Kiffy Rubbo and Lesley Dumbell. While she is working at the Ewing and George Paton Galleries, she housed and supporting the development of the slide collection for four years. She had worked on the editorial collective of Lip Magazine from 1976-1984.

She joined the Mill Community Theatre as an actress and general manager in 1979, and in 1982 became a founding member of the Home Cooking Theatre Co., one of two professional feminist theatre companies in Australia.

Among her acting and directing credits, Rogers appeared as Clytemnestra in The Oresteia at the Pram Factory in 1974. Rogers received the Ewa Czjawor Memorial Award in 2003 for designing and directing Peta Tait and Martra Robertson's Breath By Breath, which was also nominated for the Green Room Awards for Best Fringe Production. For 5 seasons she appeared in Bagryana Popov's Uncle Vanya, until 2018. Rogers is a member of the award-winning queer performance collective, Gold Satino.

Rogers has taught for more than twenty years in the Theatre and Drama Program at the La Trobe University, where her research focuses on ‘the transformational relationship between actors and objects on stage’.

In 2008 Rogers' essay, 'Arts Melbourne and the End of the Seventies: the Ideology of the Collective Versus Collective Ideologies' was included in the book When You Think About Art what Do You Think?: The Ewing and George Paton Galleries 1971 – 2008. In 2016, Rogers authored The Mill: Experiments in Theatre and Community, documenting the legacy and impact of the theatre.

In 2020, as a life member of the Women's Art Register, Rogers was interviewed by Manisha Anjali for the series It Comes in Waves.
