= Juliette Peers =

Australian art historian, curator, artist and writer

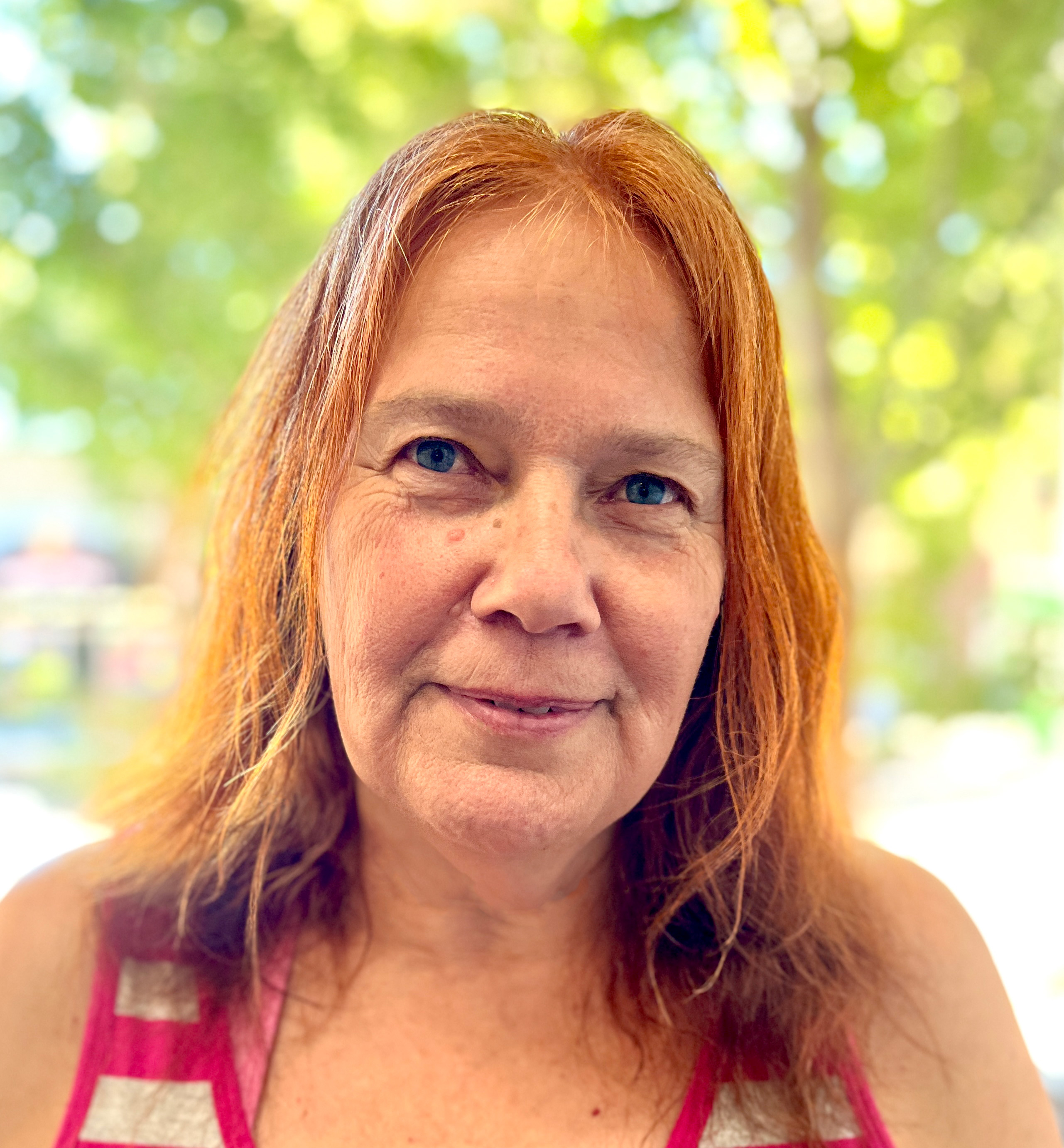
- March 2025
- Born: abt. 1965 (age 60–61); Melbourne, Australia
- Other name: Juliet Peers
- Education: University of Melbourne, Deakin University
- Occupations: Art historian, curator, artist, writer

Juliette Peers, also credited as Juliet Peers, is an Australian art historian, curator, artist and writer, based in Central Victoria, Australia. She is an advocate for feminist art, with a significant body of work focused on overlooked but notable female artists.

== Biography ==
Peers was born in Melbourne, Australia. She obtained a B.A. from the University of Melbourne, a graduate diploma in Museum Studies from Victoria College, Melbourne in 1988, and a doctorate from Deakin University in 1999.

From 1994 to 2019, Peers lectured at the School of Architecture and Design at RMIT. She was the Victorian reviews editor, and also served on the editorial Board of the Australian contemporary art magazine Artlink and contributed to the Australian Dictionary of Biography, including entries for Edward Officer, Isabel Tweddle, and Karl Duldig. Peers is a life member of the Women’s Art Register.

Peers has curated numerous exhibitions in Australia, Europe, and North America. Her book More than Just Gumtrees was described as "an indispensable resource for art historians, curators, collectors, artists, dealers, auction houses and students alike.

== Notable exhibitions ==
- the Completing the Picture: Women Artists and the Heidelberg School exhibition (1992), which highlighted hidden figures who worked alongside the Heidelberg School. The exhibition attracted 100,000 visitors across Australia; and
- the Filling the Gap project, which similarly sought to highlight unsung female artists and close gender gaps in the historical record.

== Major publications ==
=== Books ===
- What no man had ever done before (Dawn Revival Press, 1992),
- Completing the picture: women artists and the Heidelberg era co-curated with Victoria Hammond (Artmoves, 1992)
- The fashion doll: from BeÌbeÌ Jumeau to Barbie (Berg, 2004)
- Clifford Bayliss, 1912-1989: surrealist drawings from the 1940s, (Bridget McDonnell Gallery, 1995)
- Anne Marie Power (Telos Art Publishing, 2001)
- Sculpture: the McClelland Gallery Permanent Collection (McClelland Gallery, 1989)
- The 2 Pi r Group: Meg Benwell, Toni Bucknell, Isabel Davies, Wendy Kelly, Maureen McDermott, Rachel Rovay, Josie Telfer, Lillian Townsend, Aloma Treister, Pam Wragg, Maxienne Tritton Young (2 Pi r Artists, 1999)
- The new sculpture in Australia: Australian art nouveau sculpture 1880-1920
- More than just gumtrees: a personal, social and artistic history of the Melbourne Society of Women Painters and Sculptors (Dawn Revival Press, 1993)
- Cafe Petrushka: a slice of Melbourne's artistic life of the 1930s (McClelland Gallery, 1990).

=== Essays ===
Peers has contributed essays and commentary to:

- A garden for all seasons: an artist's view of the Royal Botanic Gardens edited by Anne Graham (Craftsman House, 1998)
- Louie B. Riggall (1868-1918) (Latrobe Regional Gallery, 1995)
- The women's art register (Women's Art Register, 2005), Hope Safe: Kate Just (Blurb, 2014)
- Outrage, obscenity and madess: (sex, vile gossip, art and illustration): Melbourne's Pictorial weekly budget, The citizen, Banner of truth and Police news: 1875-2015 by Elizabeth Gertsakis (William Mora Galleries, 2015)
- Annette Bezor (Florence Lynch Gallery, 2003)
- Judith M Perrey: $b Memorial Retrospective (Victorian Artists' Society Galleries, 2021)
- Erica Mcgilchrist: for the record (Heide Museum of Modern Art, 2017)
- The full majesty of nature: the collection of Dr Samuel Arthur Ewing (The Ian Potter Museum of Art, 2002)
- The story that we make is the song that we sing, (Wollongong City Gallery, 1993)
- Into the Light Recovering Australia's Lost Women Artists: Into the Light Donor Circle Acquisitions 2021.
- It comes in waves... and the latest one is a tsunami in Keeping things together: 50 years of the Women's Art Register (Melbourne University Press, 2026)

=== Articles ===
Peers has published articles in Artlink, Art and Australia, Australasian Victorian Studies Journal, Australian and New Zealand Journal of Art, Australasian Journal of Victorian Studies, Australian Journal of Art, This Australia, Australian Cultural History, Journal of Australian Studies, La Trobe Library Journal, Australian Women's Book Review, Art Monthly Australia, Quadrant, Australian and New Zealand Journal of Art, Australian Journal of Biography and History, Eureka Street, Australian Historical Studies, Australian Quarterly, Screen Education, Southerly.
