= Kiffy Rubbo =

Australian gallery director and curator

Kristin "Kiffy" Dattilo Rubbo (28 December 1943 – 1980) was an Australian gallery director and curator.

== Early life and education ==
Rubbo was born in Melbourne to artist Ellen Rubbo and professor of microbiology Sydney Dattilo Rubbo. She had three siblings, academic architect Anna Rubbo, bookseller Mark Rubbo (born 1948) and artist and filmmaker Michael Rubbo (born 1938). Rubbo's family had strong connections to the arts. Her mother was a painter, and regularly exhibited in the Art Gallery of New South Wales and the Victorian state galleries. Her father also had an interest in the arts, especially painting, sculpture and the theatre. Her Italian-born grandfather Antonio Dattilo Rubbo was an artist and well-known art teacher. He taught at the (Royal) Art Society of New South Wales where he was also a council-member. While a teenager, Rubbo studied drama in New York. Rubbo graduated with a Bachelor of Arts from the University of Melbourne in 1965.

== Career ==
In 1971, Rubbo was appointed as Director of the Student Union's Rowden White Library. Shortly thereafter she became the inaugural Director of the Ewing and George Paton Galleries at the University of Melbourne. She filled the role of Gallery Director until 1979 when she took a career break.

The George Paton Gallery was the first funded art space dedicated to contemporary art in Australia. Under Rubbo's leadership, the gallery hosted and supported an array of leading experimental, activist and community-based exhibitions and events. Highlights include:

In 1972, the inaugural Bubbles event at the gallery hosted three-thousand children for school holiday creative workshops. Frances Lindsay describes the initiative as "a pioneer program in Australian galleries and museums for the active and educative engagement of young people".

With Meredith Rogers, the gallery's assistant director, in 1974 Rubbo began producing a regular listing of Melbourne gallery shows as an informal mimeographed publication, naming it the Art Almanac under which name it continues.

The 1974 exhibition A Room of One’s Own: Three Women Artists, which Rubbo co-curated with Lynne Cook and Janine Burke, helped initiate the Melbourne Women's Art Movement. The following year, Rubbo commissioned Burke to curate the national touring exhibition Australian Women Artists 1840–1940. The gallery hosted international feminist art critic, Lucy Lippard, who delivered a talk to a women-only audience. Melbourne's Women's Art Forum and Women's Art Register were subsequently established in the gallery.

In 1975, the gallery hosted Stelarc's Insert/Imprint/Extend: event for amplified, modified, monitored man. The exhibition involved Stelarc being continuously physically present in the gallery for 10 days. His bodily sounds including his heart, lungs and muscle movements were recorded and amplified.

Following Rubbo's death, Lip feminist art magazine published recollections on her life. Meredith Rogers, Suzanne Davies, Janine Burke and Judy Annear penned contributions. Rogers was Associate Director at the gallery from 1975 to the start of 1979. Her text describes Rubbo's uniquely collaborative and anti-hierarchical working manner, which was conversational, personal, emotional and feminist.

In August 2014, Rubbo's curatorial legacy was celebrated in a symposium Kiffy Rubbo: Curating the 1970's organised by Janine Burke at the University of Melbourne. The keynote lecture, Kiffy Rubbo, Women Curators and Australian Art Galleries, delivered by Frances Lindsay, former Deputy Director, National Gallery of Victoria, founding director of the Victorian College of the Arts Gallery and Honorary Senior Fellow at the University of Melbourne. The papers from the symposium were edited by Janine Burke and Helen Hughes and published in 2016.

== Personal life ==
Rubbo was married to architect Dennis Carter. They had two children, Bridie, and Barny. In 1980, at 36 years old, Rubbo committed suicide.
