= Bonita Ely =

Australian artist (born 1946)

- Born: 1946 (age 79–80); Mildura, Victoria, Australia
- Education: Caulfield Institute of Technology; Prahran College of Advanced Education; St Martins School of Art, London; Sydney College of the Arts, Sydney University; University of Western Sydney
- Notable work: C20th Mythological Beasts: at Home with the Locust People (1973-75); Murray River Punch (1979); Dogwoman Makes History (1983); Interior Decoration (2013 - 2017); Plastikus Progressus (2017); Menindee Fish Kill (2019); Let Me Take You There: the Great Artesian Basin (2021)
- Website: bonitaely.com

Bonita Ely (born 1946) is an Australian multidisciplinary artist who lives in Sydney, whose work has been internationally exhibited. She established her reputation as a Fluxus and environmental artist in the 1970s, the former through her installation, C20th Mythological Beasts: at Home with the Locust People and other ephemeral artworks, the latter, her works concerning the Murray-Darling river system. She has a diverse practice across various media and has often addressed feminist, environmental and socio-political issues.

== Early life and education ==
Ely was born in Mildura and raised in Robinvale, in Latji Latji country, a town on the banks of the Murray River in the Mallee region of north western Victoria, with her elder sister and two brothers. Her family grew oranges and grapes on a block of land her father, a World War II veteran, received through the Soldier Settlement Scheme. In a 2019 oral history interview for the State Library of Queensland, Ely describes her childhood as creative, where she was encouraged by her parents to try anything. She recalls drawing from an early age, even before starting school, using sticks to draw in the dirt and charcoal discarded from the wood stove to draw on the walls of the tin pickers' hut.

Following high school in Robinvale, Ely moved to Melbourne to study painting at Caulfield Technical College, where she was taught by Pam Hallandal. After completing a Certificate of Art (Painting) in 1966, Ely worked for a year as a secondary school arts teacher in Warrnambool Secondary Technical College, before returning to Melbourne to study at the Prahran College of Fine Arts, where she was taught by Clive Murray White and influenced by the Fluxus movement, completing a Diploma of Fine Arts (Sculpture) in 1969.

She received a Master of Art (Fine Arts) in 1999 from the Sydney College of the Arts, University of Sydney, and was awarded a Doctor of Philosophy in 2009 from the University of Western Sydney for a thesis researching the influences of Taoist philosophy and cultural practices on contemporary art practice.

== Academic career ==
Elys first academic employment was at Prahran College of Fine Art teaching Sculpture. She also ran performance workshops following the performances, "Jabiluka UO2", addressing Aboriginal land rights in 1979 and "Murray River Punch" in the early 80s addressing the pollution of the Murray River. Performance was a new art form then. In 1984 she lectured in the Sculpture Department part time at Sydney College of the Arts, and in 1986 was employed full time in the Art School at Charles Sturt University, Wagga Wagga, retiring in 1987 having been awarded an Australia Council Grant to research for her Masters degree during Australia’ Bicentennial Year, so called Wilderness. In 1999 she began lecturing at the College of Fine Arts (COFA) establishing the Sculpture, Performance and Installation Studies Area University of New South Wales Art & Design Faculty from 1990 to 2017. During this time she conducted workshops following lectures on contemporary art teaching methods at the School of Art in Hue, Vietnam, and Invercargill, New Zealand. She supervised Honours, Masters and PhD students, and ran these programs at COFA also. IN 2017 she retired as Honorary Associate Professor of the faculty.

== Art career ==
Ely established her reputation as an environmental artist in the 1970s through her works concerning the Murray-Darling river system. She has a diverse practice across various media and has often addressed feminist, environmental and socio-political issues.

Ely's first exhibition was in London in 1972, but recognition of her artwork in Australia effectively started at the Mildura Sculpture Triennial of 1975. Her interdisciplinary installation, C20th Mythological Beasts: at Home with the Locust People (1975) had its beginnings in New York where Bonita Ely lived from 1973 to 1975.

Her performances of the 1970s and 1980s were concerned primarily with environmental and political issues. For instance in her performance Jabiluka UO_{2} (1979), Ely explored issues surrounding Aboriginal Land Rights and uranium mining in the Northern Territory.

The work Breadline (1980) examines themes of womanhood and pregnancy. Ely cast her nude body on a slab of bread dough, which she washed off in a bath of milk. She then moulded in bread dough a female form using geometric shapes referencing mathematics, not the traditional organic forms associated with the feminine. During this action bread was baked then served to viewers after the performance. As a complex exploration of women's traditional roles, the performance is both a celebration of motherhood and nurture, and a critique of woman as non-intellectual; a consumable product of culture.

In Dogwoman Communicates with the Younger Generation (1981), and Dogwoman Makes History (1983), the anthropomorphised fascination with another species was documented, alongside the gendered construction of history, creating a religion/history using images of women and dogs documented in the international collections of Berlin's museums, documented whilst artist-in-residence at Künstlerhaus Bethanien, Berlin.

The three-part, futuristic installation, We Live to be Surprised, presented for her Master of Art examination shown at Performance Space, Sydney in 1991, included nine red thunderbolts shooting up from the floor and 'snabbits' - genetically engineered creatures combining the snail's legless body and rabbit's head - hiding in ruins in the space opposite. A short story explains they are the only living creatures left on a post-apocalyptic Earth and are an excellent source of food in the future's dystopian environments as they cannot escape and are delicious. Between the thunderbolts and the snabbits' habitat, viewers pass through a corridor of golden light, a liminal space between energy and entropy.

== Art practice and influences ==
Ely's art practice is often categorised as environmental or socio-political or feminist, and she acknowledges the early influence of the Fluxus Movement. In 2019 Ely was interviewed in a digital story and oral history for the State Library of Queensland's James C Sourris AM Collection. In the interview Ely talks to writer Julie Ewington about her life, her art and her career.

=== Murray River ===
The Murray River, one of the world's longest rivers, has been an enduring focus of Ely's practice. Murray River Punch (1980) is one of Ely's most well known and significant performances. The work was first performed at Melbourne University's George Paton Gallery in June 1980 as part of a week of performance titled Women at Work. In this work the artist set up a cooking demonstration in the university's Student Union foyer at lunchtime and assumed the role of a cooking demonstrator who narrates the recipe for a ‘punch’ drink.

The ingredients are the pollutants in the Murray River.

More recent work addresses the river's declining health during the Millennium Drought, when environmentally unsustainable agricultural practices exacerbated acid sulphate contamination and outbreaks of toxic blue green algae. Ely's forensic research along the length of the river resulted in a photographic series titled The Murray's Edge. A reprise of the performance, Murray River Punch with the subtitle the Dip, the scarcity of water resulted in a 'dip' or delicious pie filler, made up of river pollutants. In 2014 with artist Emma Price, Ely celebrated the health of the river creating “Murray River Punch: the Soup”, the recipe’s ingredients rubbish collected at a picnic site on the river in Mildura. The performance parodied the TV show, My Kitchen Rules.

In 2019 after prolonged drought more than 1,000,000 fish were killed in the Darling River at Menindee. The river stopped flowing, the stagnant water’s temperature was high, ideal conditions for the growth of toxic blue-green algae. The water temperature suddenly dropped killing the algae bloom, bacteria feeding on the algae sucked all the oxygen out of the water killing all the fish. Bonita Ely immersed herself in the river amongst the dead fish in the pose of Millais’s “Ophelia”, lying back, chest heaving, body sinking, her open hands raised in helpless resignation. Her performance for camera was photographed by Melissa Williams-Brown.

=== Let Me Take You There: the Great Artesian Basin ===
Researching the natural environment in the vicinity of the Adani Mine Ely became aware of the mine’s threat to the Great Artesian Basin (GAB), the world’s largest aquifer that is a little known but an essential source of fresh water in Australia’s arid regions. A large floor map of the GAB (5000mm x 4140mm) shows the water flow, contours, springs, recharge zones, cities and towns for orientation and significantly, coal seams and gas and petroleum exploration or production sites that potentially pollute the GAB.

== Exhibitions, commissions and collections ==
Her work has been internationally exhibited, including in documenta14 in Kassel, Germany and Athens, Greece, at the Tate Gallery and Chisenhale Gallery, London; the Paris Museum, France; Künstlerhaus Bethanien, Berlin; Harbourfront, Toronto; the 18th Street Arts Centre, Los Angeles, US; and the National Museum of Modern and Contemporary Art, Seoul, Korea.

In 2024 her installations, "C20th Mythological Beasts: at Home with the Locust People" and "Interior Decoration", addressing intergenerational post traumatic Stress Disorder (PTSD) were in the Biennale of Sydney. In the 2022 Biennale of Sydney she performed "Slip Slap", addressing plastic pollution.

Ely's experimental artworks are in international collections such as the Tate Museum, London, Museum of Modern Art, New York and the National Gallery of Australia, Canberra, and have been selected for significant contemporary art events such as Fieldwork, the opening of the Ian Potter Centre: NGV Australia, Melbourne. She has also produced three public sculptures for the City of Huế, Vietnam (1998, 2002, 2006).

=== Public sculpture commissions in Huế, Vietnam ===
In 1998, Ely was invited to create a public sculpture for the Children's Cultural Centre in Huế, Vietnam, participating in the 2nd Sculpture Symposium. Her interactive work takes the form of a hollow haystack, referencing the conical stacks made of rice 'hay' in the fields around Huế that were used for cooking fires. The sculpture's three arch-shaped entrances are approximately one metre high – children's height – and its barrel-shaped base acts like an acoustic chamber, collecting the sounds in the surrounding environment. Small holes in the conical space above illuminate the interior with soft bands of light. The sculpture is made from the small, traditional bricks from the Huế Citadel's brickworks. As such it is a record of bygone cultural materials & practices.

Research of Huế's longevity characters informed Ely's second public sculpture in the city, titled Longevity: Scissors and Sickles (2002). Scissors and sickles made by local blacksmiths were caste and braised together in a lattice pattern to form a three dimensional interpretation of a longevity symbol. Shaped like a gourd, the scrap metal used included shrapnel from the American War, as it is known in Vietnam.

In 2006, Ely was invited back for Huế's 4th International Sculpture Symposium, where the dynamic, zig-zag symbol of the thunderbolt appears again in her work, this time as a 6m steel tube sculpture that glows in the dark. Titled Lake Thunder, the sculpture's location at Thuy Tien Lake is an essential aspect of the work, evoking traditional Taoist philosophical principles expressed in the Inner Teachings of Taoism by Chang Po-Tuan (or Zhang Boduan):

'THUNDER stands for our true essence, LAKE stands for our true sense, WATER stands for our real knowledge, and FIRE stands for our conscious knowledge. These four are the true 'four forms' inherent in us.'

=== documenta14 ===
Ely was selected to represent Australia at documenta14 in 2017, where she exhibited the installations Interior Decoration in the Palais Bellevue in Kassel, Germany, and Plastikus Progressus in Athens, Greece.

Interior Decoration investigates the inter-generational effects of post-traumatic stress disorder (PTSD).

“PTSD typically leads to emotional numbing, … recurrent nightmares, substance abuse (traditionally, alcoholism), … delusional outbursts of violence.” (Goldstein, 2001).

The installation Interior Decoration is embedded into the domestic environment of the Palais Bellevue. It explores the inter generational effects of untreated PTSD suffered, for example, by war veterans, refugees, Indigenous people, displaced people and victims of genocide. Constructed from domestic objects, the military is domesticated, the domestic militarised. For example, 'Sewing Machine Gun' is made from the conjunction of a Singer sewing machine, a woman's industry, bobby pins, her intimate femininity, to create a Vickers machine gun, problematising the encodings of these objects to present the viewer with emotionally charged conundrums reflective of complexities rather than a didactic illustration of gendered conflict. Similarly the bedroom furniture turned inside-out forms polished wooden tunnel-like trenches, hiding places, all surveyed by the ladder-less 'Watchtower', made from a marriage bed, its floor the wire springs of a child's cot mattress. The installation embeds the viewer in the uncanny feelings of an adult transported back to childhood, inviting exploration to uncover its multiplicities. The sculptural components are contextualised by a dado around the room composed of a visual narrative addressing trauma, and the names of Kassel's Jewish people deported and killed during WW2. Their names are inscribed on a section of railway tracks at the KulturBahnhof (Kassel Central Station), an installation by Dr. Horst Hoheisel, Das Gedächtnis der Gleise ('The Memory of the Tracks' – 2015). Interior Decoration is a reminder of PTSD as a ubiquitous yet under acknowledged cause of conflict and suffering in social and personal relations.

The installation Plastikus Progressus in the Athens iteration of documenta14 was exhibited in the Athens School of Fine Arts Gallery. It addresses the contribution of casual littering to the plastic pollution of the trans-ecology of water. Set in the year 2054, it takes the form of a natural history display. A diorama features plastic eating creatures, their physiologies built on vacuum cleaners & the parts thereof the artist found discarded on Sydney's streets. The creatures have been genetically engineered using the CRISPR method to clean up the plastics polluting oceans and rivers. The diorama is contextualised by photographs of pristine nature as it would have been in 1905 – the year the first synthetic plastic, bakelite, was invented – plus case studies of rivers in Athens, Kassel and Sydney in 2017, showing plastic pollution off city streets floating towards the ocean, contextualised by a world history from 2000 BC to 2054 AD showing the emergence, dominance then decline of nations, ending in 2054 with plastic filled, swirling gyres. Each genetically modified creature is described in a taxonomy presented on a touch screen, preserved on the Plastikus Progressus website.

=== Other works ===
In 2010 Bonita Ely was selected to create a public artwork to celebrate the 10th Anniversary of Sydney's Green Olympics. Made from a recycled windmill, the Thunderbolt is powered by solar energy, the sculpture's lighting signals to the community their level of energy consumption in the neighborhood at night, changing colour from green to yellow to red.

These environmental works are informed by Ely's cross-cultural research of our relationship to land, first tracing the narratives inscribed upon natural landscapes in Australia's Aboriginal mythologies, or Song Lines, that weave across tribal nations' countries, functioning as ethical, spiritual, and practical narratives used to navigate across complex terrain, embedding environmental knowledges essential for food gathering, hunting, reading the seasons, the winds. Similarly in India's Hindu mythologies, Chinese and Japanese gardens, Europe's pre-Christian animistic belief systems, the landscape was/is inscribed with meaning. The installation Juggernaut, shown in Sydney, Melbourne, Brisbane and the Asian Biennale of Contemporary Art, Dhaka, Bangladesh (1999), evoked this inscription of terrain. Each giant, spiralling turn transforms its internal spatial form, its peripatetic force simultaneous to a sense of fragility - the giant spirals are kept in place with wedges at floor level and spacers held in tension between each turn of the spiral, so the sculpture's structural integrity is in 'suspended animation'.

== Personal life ==
Around 1981 Ely met Sydney artist Marr Grounds when they were commissioned to participate in an exchange with artists from Toronto, Canada curated by Sandra Drew. They had a daughter together, born in Berlin when he had a year's residency at Künstlerhaus Bethanien.
