= Ingeborg Tyssen =

Dutch–Australian photographer, teacher, and writer

- Born: Ingeborg Anna-Maryke Tijssen; 1945; Voorburg
- Died: 8 October 2002 (aged 56–57); Netherlands
- Education: Sydney College of the Arts
- Known for: street photography, fine art photography
- Spouse: John Williams
- Parents: Pieter Tijssen (father); Olga van Blaaroum (mother)

Ingeborg Anna-Maryke Tijssen (1945–2002), known as Ingeborg Tyssen, was a Netherlands-born Australian photographer, teacher and writer active from 1975 to 2002.

== Early life and education ==
Ingeborg Anna-Maryke Tyssen was born in Voorburg, the Netherlands, to painter and illustrator Olga van Blaaroum and Pieter Tijssen, a filmmaker. In 1957, when she was twelve, the family emigrated to Sydney, where Ingeborg attended Riverside Girls' High School and became school captain.

She then trained in nursing, including midwifery; but from 1974, as recalled by photographer and friend Debra Phillips, Tyssen became devoted to photography. Tyssen identified her interest in photography as originating in her efforts to document her "travels in New Guinea, Europe and Africa in the early '70s. After returning to Australia, I became increasingly frustrated with my photographs ... which appeared to capture far less than I was able to perceive".

Tyssen found that in the 1970s "the only courses available were either full-time professional photography courses or the one art course offered at Prahran College in Melbourne. Camera clubs and salons were fairly dogmatic in their approach to photography and, for the most part, took unkindly to anybody who challenged their conventions".

In Sydney, photography classes offered were either at Peter Gabelle's newly established gallery and workshop at Bondi, or John Williams sessions at the Workers' Educational Association (WEA) in which she enrolled and found "John's love and passion for history presented the traditions of photography within a political and cultural setting... both stimulating and inspiring".

== Street photography 1975–1981 ==
In 1975 Tyssen wrote: "Whenever possible I carry a loaded camera ... I react without too much thought. Rarely do I wait for a situation to resolve itself. Nor do I direct or provoke people. The important aspects are composition, texture and light."

That year, Tyssen and Wiliams moved to Melbourne, and with Prahran College student Rod McNichol and his lecturer Paul Cox, they established The Photographers' Gallery and Workshop in Cox's former studio and residence in Punt Road, South Yarra. 1975 was International Women's Year, and Tyssen received her earliest public recognitions, with work in the book Woman 1975, and in the National Gallery of Victoria exhibition "Wimmin": Six Australian Women Photographers; alongside Marion Hardman, Melanie Nunn, Fiona Hall, Melanie Le Guay, and Jacqueline Mitelman. Also resulting from the sojourn in Victoria was her series Melbourne Viewpoints, which Tyssen showed beside Andrew Clarke and Ian Lobb at the Australian Centre for Photography, Sydney.

The couple moved back to Sydney in 1976, and Williams was appointed foundation head of photography and film at the newly established Sydney College of the Arts. Seeking "opportunities to exchange ideas with other photographers" beyond those enrolled in photography courses, they started a discussion group comprising lan Dodd, Carol Jerrems, the American Ed Douglas, and Greg Weight. Tyssen and Williams themselves appear in Ed Douglas's 1975–1978 series City-spaces.

Williams and Tyssen married in 1978. That year they showed at the National Gallery of Victoria in Six Series with Virginia Coventry, Ed Douglas, Richard Harris, and Lyn Silverman. Reviewing the work in The Age, Tony Perry expressed doubt about John Williams' "objectivity" in his street photography in Sydney, finding the pictures "unsympathetic, often grotesque", while Tyssen's series People at Lunchtime (known by 2006 as City Light ) he judged as "almost identical" in theme, with "figures, emerging from threatening shadows into the harsh sunlight" which "while treated much more sympathetically, are no less phantasmagorical".

Tyssen completed a Bachelor of Arts (Visual Arts) in printmaking and photography in 1981 at Sydney College of the Arts, during which she exhibited beside student colleagues Martyn Jolly, Ken Hayes, Anne Zahalka at the Bondi Pavilion Gallery work that Max Dupain reviewed, describing it as:

fresh and honest. It is aiso people-oriented. They are caught in movement by her sharp and alert eye. This is manifested in the Swimming series, which is wholeheartedly involved in the laughter and fun of children. playing spontaneously in water, light and space.

Photographer Robert McFarlane in The Sydney Morning Herald in 2002 notes Tyssen's observational skills as evident in her street photography:

In one of her best known images, Wonderland, Sydney, 1978, Tyssen observed a dreamy young girl resting against the prow of a small boat. Behind, poised on the shoreline, rises the perfectly sculpted, massive form of a triceratops. In this scene, with its layered sense of prehistory, Tyssen suggests how little humanity has travelled from its primitive past. Tyssen never imposed herself upon her subjects. She simply took her camera and approached life in the late 20th century with quiet wonder.

Martyn Jolly in his review of Stephen Zagala's 2024 publication Imagining a Real Australia: The Documentary Style 1950–1980 remarks that

Zagala ignores most of the male street photographers who were working Australia's streets with their Nikons and Pentaxes in the 1970s, in favour of Ingeborg Tyssen. Rather than being a 'gleeful voyeur', Zagala claims, Tyssen's street photography is immersed in an unsettling, perilous public space. This nuancing – of course the experience of urban space is gendered, even for street photographers – is one of the strengths of the book.

Gael Newton connects Tyssen with other feminist photographers "Christine Cornish, Ingeborg Tyssen and Debra Phillips [who] transgress medium boundaries or step into realms once denied photography (and women). They address aspects of western culture and history and in doing so they have also taken on the 'Big Picture' genres once the preserve of the 'fine arts'."

In 1982 Tyssen undertook a postgraduate diploma at Sydney College of the Arts, when she was one of 10 winners of grants in the Swiss International Photographiefoerderung. That year in October/November, Australia's 'Year of the Tree', she exhibited at Images gallery a series of photographs of trees tortured, topiaried and otherwise unnaturally disfigured by human caprice. They were included also in The Christmas Tree Show at the Art Gallery of New South Wales over 1982–1983.

== Educator ==
While still employed as a nurse and midwife, Tyssen supported her personal work and exhibiting in Australia and overseas by teaching photography at East Sydney College of TAFE, the National Art School in Darlinghurst, then at the Design Centre, Enmore.

In Autumn 1983, when Tamara Winikoff first published Photofile as the journal of the Australian Centre for Photography, Tyssen joined Mark Hinderaker and Mark Johnson as co-editors, and as Winikoff, as chief editor, remarked to Michael Fitzgerald; "It was an interesting and quite lively committee because we didn't necessarily agree with each other. So that ferment of debate was quite an interesting environment in which to create or to translate that ferment onto the page." After her death, Photofile published Blair French's obituary for Tyssen, in which he noted that "the fascinating 'strangeness' of vision in Tyssen's work suggests an authorial consciousness formed, in part, elsewhere and constantly seeking to rearticulate itself within a different world."

On 6 August 1991, as part of the exhibition In Our Time: The World as Seen by Magnum Photographers at the Art Gallery of New South Wales, Tyssen presented a 'lunchtime lecture', then an artist's talk there in November 1993.

Though the National Association for the Visual Arts (NAVA), Tyssen with Darani Lewers, Neil Brown and Barbara Allen wrote to the editor of The Sydney Morning Herald announcing that NAVA had organised an arts-industry review of the negative and stultifying effects of proposed changes to the national secondary art curriculum, which had delayed its implementation in New South Wales. They warned that downgrading specialist subject areas would "marginalise visual arts studies in schools" and would encourage students "to sacrifice content for results, leading to only a superficial grasp of art forms, their histories and practices," and handicap their opportunities in tertiary studies. They called for more consultation with all stakeholders.

Writing in 2000, Tyssen notes that by 1982 there were thirteen colleges offering photography as part of a Fine Arts diploma or degree and even postgraduate qualifications. She found that students enrolled in such courses could access the work of overseas artists more easily than that of their own peers. To remedy this lack, the exhibition and catalogue, Graduating Photography, was organised and edited by a committee comprising Miranda Lawry, Debra Phillips and Tyssen, in consultation with Christine Godden, then director of the ACP, and John Williams, then senior lecturer in photography at Sydney College of the Arts (SCA). Funded and published by the SCA Press, this survey of the work of students enrolled in colleges of advanced education around Australia collated information about the photography courses available and showcased examples of student work in a wide variety of approaches to photography.

The exhibition What is This Thing Called Photography? Australian Photography 1975–1985, held at the Art Gallery of New South Wales, Sydney, from 5 June to 29 July 1999 and seminars by Tyssen, Geoffrey Batchen, Kurt Brereton and others, spawned a companion publication released in 2000 in which Tyssen contributed an essay, "Somebody has to make something sometime: Between theory and practice lies the shadow". It surveys the medium in Australia, filtered through her own experiences, tracing its acceptance into the fine arts in the 1970s, with the 1974 opening of the Australian Centre for Photography (ACP) in Sydney and Brummels Gallery in Melbourne (1975); the establishment of a photography department at the National Gallery of Victoria directed by Jennie Boddington with a budget to acquire Australian Photography; publication of notable photobooks including Into the hollow mountains: photographs by Robert Ashton (1974), A Book About Australian Women (1974), and Woman 1975 and the journal Light Vision, featuring Australian photographers' work; and the conferences Photography in Australia: A Conference on Photography as Communication Medium and Art Form (1977), and WOPOP and its eponymous publication (1978–83). She concludes by acknowledging in 2000 that "after all the hopes of integrating photography into art, that we hear distinctions being made between photographers who use photography and artists who use photography."

== Later work 1983–2002 ==
Tyssen's work evolved from urban observation to include landscape and montages. Using a Widelux panoramic camera, she produced spatially complex views close in on the environment, with a set of eight exhibited at Images gallery in 1983 described by Mark Hinderaker as "images which sketch out relationships between landscapes, land use, and culture and...the visual perceptions (and conceptions) of the photographer. [...] Internal reverberations link one image to another and suggest an encompassing view of the world." Of these series shown over 1984/5 After the Artefact: An exhibition of Contemporary Photographic Practice at Wollongong City Gallery and Ivan Dogherty's, Mark Johnson notes in the catalogue as "a truism of photography" that the convention of exhibiting stand-alone, uncaptioned photographs isolates subjects from their context. By contrast, the artists in this exhibition, he remarks, present their images in related sequences:

Consider what happens to Tyssen's landscape photographs when they are arranged in series (i.e. placed in a context): is the series literal, showing stops along a journey from A to B? Is it metamorphical, making a gradation between virgin forest on the one extreme, and flattened, denuded farmland during a drought, on the other extreme? Is it a spectrum between longer and shorter exposures under the developing lamp, moving from a dark, velvety print quality to a blanched, washed-out quality?

Reviewing the 1986 group show A Difference of Opinion at First Draft by Tyssen, Bruce Searle, Paul Hewson, Linda Marie Walker and Kathy Triffit, Christine Godden explains that Tyssen, like many other immigrants of the 1950s, found the Australian bush unfamiliar. She was unable to draw it. In this series of "small and classically composed photographs" she used colour in her Bush Relevance Series, as a means of translating the subject to her European vision. Godden concludes that "she still brings to her picture-making many accepted conventions – and the results are pleasing." Of the same series exhibited posthumously in Photography and Place: Australian landscape photography 1970s until now at Art Gallery of NSW, 16 March–29 May 2011, Susan Best associates Tyssen's Bush Relevance with work in the show by Michael Riley, Simryn Gill, Bill Henson, David Stephenson, Anne Ferran, Marion Marrison, Douglas Holleley, and Wesley Stacey, who all present "close-up views of small slices of the environment or that focused on single element" to emphasise the picture plane, locking the viewer out, rather than inviting a perception of space.

Praising the "meticulously crafted objects" in the 1991 group show The Memory of Forgetting, critic Christopher Allen notices Tyssen's "tiny photographs, not much bigger than a large postage stamp, set on a framing field of black...and representing mostly Roman sculptural fragments".

In 1993 when the Australia Council announced multi-year stipends for artists, Tyssen was a recipient. From its founding in August 1995 by Sandra Byron and Penny Mapp, Tyssen was represented by their Byron Mapp Gallery.

For The Voice of Silence, exhibited at the Art Gallery of New South Wales in 1995, Tyssen montaged her imagery, abutting her prints from medium-format negatives to form panoramas over a metre wide, or in banks of square-format frames, in which, as she explained, sculptural and architectural fragments photographed in Paris evoke old Europe and reveal her emigrant sense of dislocation and "the mechanisms by which we are transported to imaginative space". Capon and McDonald confirm how Tyssen's personal migrant experience of being estranged from the language and legends of her native country—as she said; "the onomatopoeic nursery rhymes which initiated me, as a child, into the dark secrets of the European woods"—inspires The Voice of Silence to deal with "language, image and historical references and the formation of cultural identities", and how its cinema-format, tenebrous panoramas manipulate the scale, and space around, classical sculpture and architecture to develop a mythic narrative that revives or evokes memory.

== Death and legacy ==
Robert Deane, a researcher at the Australian National Gallery, noted in an October 2000 lecture Tyssen's influence as one amongst other postwar immigrant photographers Paul Cox, Ed Douglas, John Fields, John Hearder, Graham McCarter and Joe Mitchell. Tyssen returned to the Netherlands in October 2002 to produce imagery exploring her Dutch/Australian identity while Williams remained in Australia for his own work. On 3 October 2002, while Tyssen and her brother Roland were sitting by a river, a speeding motorcyclist struck Ingeborg. Initially conscious, she was transferred to hospital where she went into a coma. Williams flew to Holland, arriving on 6 October. Tyssen died two days later. She was survived by John, her mother, Olga, and two brothers, Bob and Roland Tijssen.

Annual fundraisers to augment its collection of contemporary works by the Art Gallery of New South Wales had in 1993 raised about $50,000 with which contemporary curator, Victoria Lynn, bought works by artists not previously acquired by the gallery, including Tyssen's. AGNSW's Judy Annear showed those photographs during November 2002 as a tribute.

McFarlane, who championed her work throughout her career, hailed Tyssen as:

...one of the most talented photographers from the postwar generation. In her later, more complex work, she explored areas almost untouched by other photographers. The originality and lack of ego in these images will ensure their enduring place in the history of the medium.

In 2006 John Williams and Anne O'Hehir assembled a survey of her work in Ingeborg Tyssen: photographs published by T&G Publishing, and posthumously she has been remembered with solo exhibitions at Sandra Byron Gallery, the Museum of Sydney, Hazelhurst Gallery, and Monash Gallery of Art (the Museum of Australian Photography); and also in numbers of themed or survey exhibitions in major galleries including the Tasmanian Museum and Art Gallery, Art Gallery of New South Wales, Museum of Australian Photography and the National Gallery of Victoria.

== Publications ==
- Tyssen, Ingeborg (Spring 1980). "Ingeborg Tyssen portfolio". PhotoForum Supplement (5).
- Graduating Photography Committee; Australian Centre for Photography; Sydney College of the Arts; Lawry, Miranda (1982). Graduating photography. Glebe, NSW: Sydney College of the Arts Press. ISBN 978-0-908231-32-4.
- Crombie, Isobel; Byron, Sandra; National Gallery of Victoria; Art Gallery of New South Wales, eds. (1990). Twenty contemporary Australian photographers: from the Hallmark Cards Australian Photographic Collection. Melbourne, Vic: National Gallery of Victoria. ISBN 978-0-7241-0142-9.
- Tyssen, Ingeborg (1993). The voice of silence: Paris 1991–1992. Woolloomooloo, N.S.W: Artspace. OCLC 222005953.
- Tyssen, Ingeborg; Art Gallery of New South Wales (1995). Twenty years of photograph. Sydney, NSW: Art Gallery of New South Wales.
- Tyssen, Ingeborg (2000). "Somebody has to make something sometime: Between theory and practice lies the shadow". In McDonald, Ewen; Annear, Judy (eds.). What is this thing called photography?: Australian photography 1975–1985. Annandale, NSW: Pluto Press Australia. pp. 49–64. ISBN 9781864031614.
- Tyssen, Ingeborg; Williams, John; O’Hehir, Anne (2006). Williams, John (ed.). Ingeborg Tyssen : photographs. Canterbury, N.S.W: T&G Publishing. ISBN 9780977579006.
- Annear, Judy; Art Gallery of New South Wales (2011). Photography & place. Sydney, NSW: Art Gallery of New South Wales. ISBN 9781741740660.

== Exhibitions ==
=== Solo/joint ===
- 1982, to 7 November: Ingeborg Tyssen. Images Gallery, 48 Derwent Street, Glebe
- 1983, 6–17 April: The Panorama Show. Panoramic photographs by Ingeborg Tyssen and Peter Murphy, Images gallery 27 Glebe Point Rd. Glebe
- 1986, December: Works by Ingeborg Tyssen and John Williams. Foton
- 1987, 30 March–16 April: Photography: Debra Phillips, and Ingeborg Tyssen. Photospace Gallery, Canberra School Art
- 1989, to 29 October: Ingeborg Tyssen *diep in het donkere groene bos*. First Draft, Abercrombie Street, Chippendale
- 1993, April: The Voice of Silence: works by Ingeborg Tyssen. Artspace, The Gunnery, 43–51 Cowper Wharf Rd, Woolloomooloo
- 1994, March–April: The Voice of Silence: works by Ingeborg Tyssen. Centre for Contemporary Photography, 205 Johnston St., Fitzroy, Vic.
- 1995, 2 March–9 April: Ingeborg Tyssen – Twenty Years of Photography, Art Gallery of New South Wales, Sydney

==== Posthumous ====
- 2006, to 14 October: Retrospective exhibition of Tyssen street photography. Sandra Byron Gallery, 2 Danks Street,Waterloo
- 2006, November–3 December: Ingeborg Tyssen: Sydney photographs 1974–84. Museum of Sydney
- 2012, 12 May–24 June: Ingeborg Tyssen: Photographs. Hazelhurst Gallery
- 2012/13, 21 November–3 February: Ingeborg Tyssen: Photographs. Monash Gallery of Art (Museum of Australian Photography)

=== Group ===
- 1975, 3 October–16 November: “Wimmin” Six Australian Women Photographers; Marion Hardman, Melanie Nunn, Fiona Hall, Melanie Le Guay, Ingebord Tyssen, and Jacqueline Mitelman. National Gallery of Victoria
- 1975/6, 2 December–17 January: Melbourne Viewpoints: Andrew Clarke, Ian Lobb, Ingeborg Tyssen. Australian Centre for Photography
- 1976: Photographs by Robert Ashton, Alan Betteridge, John Cato, Jan Dalman, Peter Dombrovskis, Max Dupain, Rennie Ellis, Fiona Hall, Richard Harris, Judith Kile, Jacqueline Mitelman, David Moore, Roger Scott, Ingeborg Tyssen, John Williams, Laurie Wilson. Tasmanian Museum and Art Gallery
- 1976: Photographs by J. Craig Annan, Robert Ashton, John Bilney, Wilfred Broadhead, Brenda Carruthers, Mark Cohen, Arthur Dickinson, Max Dupain, J. B. Eaton, David Ellis, Rennie Ellis, S. W. Eutrope, Mario Giacomelli, Anthony Green, Fiona Hall, Marion Hardman, E. B. Hawkes, Bill Henson, W. Holieson, John Kauffman, Melanie Le Guay, Jean-Mark Ie Pechoux, Steven Lojewski, Hedda Morrison, William Owen, Wes Placek, Julian Smith, Ingeborg Tyssen, J. M. Whitehead. National Gallery of Victoria
- 1978, 11 August–1 October: Six Series. Australian multi-image works by Virginia Coventry, Ed Douglas. Richard Harris, Lyn Silverman, Ingeborg Tyssen and John Williams. Photography Gallery. 3rd floor, National Gallery of Victoria
- 1981, Four Photographers, Tyssen with Martyn Jolly, Ken Hayes, Anne Zahalka. Bondi Pavilion Gallery
- 1981, 12 August – 2 September: Fifteen Australian Photographers. Wesley Stacey, Fiona Hall, Peter Elliston, Ingeborg Tyssen, Peter Charuk, Dr Charles Gabriel, Henri Mallard, Graham McCarter, Karen Turner, Martin Murray. Australian Centre for Photography (ACP)
- 1982/3, to 9 January: The Christmas Tree Show, Art Gallery of New South Wales
- 1984, 5 July–5 August: After the Artefact: An exhibition of Contemporary Photographic Practice. John Delacour, Paul Hewson, Mark Hinderaker, Mark Johnson, Geoff Kleem, Miranda Lawry, Juilee Pryor, Jacky Redgate, Bruce Searle, Ingeborg Tyssen. Wollongong City Gallery
- 1985, 4–22 June: After the Artefact: An exhibition of Contemporary Photographic Practice. Ivan Dougherty Gallery, Sydney
- 1986, to 28 September: A Difference of Opinion. Photographs and accompanying texts by Bruce Searle, Ingeborg Tyssen, Paul Hewson, Linda Marie Walker and Kathy Triffit. First Draft, 2nd Floor, 27 Abercrombie St, Chippendale
- 1991, March: The Memory Of Forgetting – Tyssen with Michael Bognar, Bruce McCalmont, Diane McCarthy. Performance Space, 15 Cleveland Street, Redfern
- 1991, 6 July–22 September: Contemporary Colour Photographs from the Collection, Art Gallery of New South Wales
- 1993, 6 October–28 November: Australian Perspecta 1993, Robert Ambrose Cole, Adam Cullen, Richard Bell Devine, Ingeborg Tyssen, Judy Watson, Constanze Zikos. Art Gallery of New South Wales, Sydney
- 1995, 25 July–30 August: Inaugural exhibition featuring works by Jeff Carter, Elliott Erwitt, Rose Farrell and George Parkin, Constantine Manos, Gerrit Fokkema, Robert McFarlane, Max Pam, Wolfgang Sievers, Henry Talbot, Ingeborg Tyssen and John Williams. Byron Mapp Gallery, 178 Oxford St, Paddington
- 1996, August–September: Exhibition of landscape photography including works by Axel Poignant, Ingeborg Tyssen, Jeff Carter, Judith Ahern, Stephen Wickham, and Harry Nankin
- 1999, 27 April–25 July: Terrains. Art Gallery of New South Wales
- 1999, 5 June–29 July: What is this thing called photography? Art Gallery of New South Wales, Sydney

==== Posthumous ====
- 2005/6, 12 November–19 February: 30 Years Ago, Tasmanian Museum and Art Gallery, Hobart
- 2011, 16 Mar 2011–29 May: Photography and Place: Australian landscape photography 1970s until now, Art Gallery of New South Wales, Sydney
- 2012/13, 13 September–3 February: Flatlands: photography and everyday space. Art Gallery of New South Wales
- 2015, 9 May–12 July: Highlights from the MGA Collection. Tyssen with Polly Borland, Pat Brassington, Olive Cotton, Max Dupain, Bill Henson, Carol Jerrems, Rosemary Laing, Ricky Maynard, Tracey Moffatt, David Moore, Polixeni Papapetrou, Patricia Piccinini, Michael Riley, Wolfgang Sievers, Mark Strizic, Darren Sylvester Anne Zahalka and others. Monash Gallery of Art (Museum of Australian Photography)
- 2017 30 September 30–12 November: An unorthodox flow of images. Curated by Naomi Cass and Pippa Milne. Centre for Contemporary Photography
- 2018, 15 June – 19 September: LEGACY. Your collection. Our story. Monash Gallery of Art (Museum of Australian Photography)
- 2022, 8 July – 18 September 2: Return to nature, Tyssen with Micky Allan, Bruce Attwell, Narelle Autio, Charles Bayliss, Mervyn Bishop, Edward Burtynsky, Nicholas Caire, John Cato, Harold Cazneaux, Peta Clancy, Nici Cumpston, Norman Cathcart Deck, Peter Dombrovskis, Marian Drew, John Bertram Eaton, Peter Elliston, Stanley W Eutrope, Joyce Evans, Anne Ferran, Robert Fielding, Murray Fredericks, Viva Gibb, Tom Goldner, John Gollings, Peter Jarver, John Kauffmann, Charles Kerry, Henry King, Katrin Koenning, Ruth Maddison, Danie Mellor, David Moore, Jack Morrison, Rebecca Najdowski and Vivian Cooper Smith, Terry Naughton, Trent Parke, Jon Rhodes, Jo Scicluna, Wesley Stacey, Samuel Sweet, David Tatnall, Brian Thompson, James Tylor, Gordon Undy, Amanda Williams, Laurie Wilson. Museum of Australian Photography
- 2025/6, 28 November–3 May: Women Photographers 1900–1975: A Legacy of Light

== Collections ==
- National Gallery of Australia
- Art Gallery of South Australia
- National Gallery of Victoria
- Art Gallery of New South Wales
