= John Williams (photographer) =

Australian photographer, academic, art critic and historian

John Frank Williams
- Born: December 18, 1933; Sydney
- Died: July 30, 2016 (aged 82); Hobart
- Education: Sydney College of the Arts
- Known for: Foundation head of photography and film, Sydney College of the Arts, histories of Australia
- Notable work: Quarantined Culture (1995)
- Style: documentary
- Movement: Modernism
- Spouses: Rosemary Simpson (divorced); Ingeborg Tyssen (died); Jean Curthoys (death)
- Parents: Francis Edward Williams (father); Anne (Anita) McDonnell (mother)

John Frank Williams (18 December 1933–30 July 2016) was an Australian photographer, academic, art critic and historian who served as the first head of photography at Sydney College of the Arts. His photographic work documenting Sydney's urban landscape in the 1960s was characterised by what he described as "rough, hard and grainy" imagery. Beyond his photographic career, Williams authored six books focused on World War I and Australian cultural history, including his notable 1995 work Quarantined Culture.

== Early life and education ==
John Williams was born in 1933 in Sydney, Australia. He was the son of Anne (Anita) Williams (née McDonnell), an accomplished violinist who abandoned her musical career upon marriage to his father, Francis Edward Williams, a World War I veteran who had emigrated from Liverpool, England in 1925, and who had 3 children from his earlier marriage to Jane Grace Purvis (1892–1975).

Williams grew up in the Sydney suburb of Maroubra and completed his secondary education at Sydney Technical High School, matriculating in 1950. Following graduation, he pursued studies in mechanical engineering at Sydney Technical College and worked as a draughtsman—a practical career path typical for post-war suburban youth for whom university education was unaffordable.

Williams placed importance less on his technical training than on his interests and independent study of social historians, particularly Barbara Tuchman, Eric Hobsbawn and A.J.P.Taylor, German language, and politics. His involvement with Labor Party suburban branches introduced him to intellectuals like Guido Baracchi, with whom he engaged in discussions about European history and politics that expanded his worldview beyond the conservative confines of Australia during the Menzies era.

== Photographic career ==
Williams began his photography as a self-taught amateur in 1958 when his wife Rosemary Simpson gave him a camera and darkroom equipment, and a catalogue of The Family of Man, Edward Steichen's influential Museum of Modern Art exhibition that toured Australia in 1959, and in which only two Australian photographers, David Moore and Laurence Le Guay, were included. This exhibition, with its documentary approach presenting a benign vision of universal humanity, had a profound impact on Williams, as it did for a generation of young Australian photographers during the Cold War era.

By the mid-1960s, Williams had developed his skills through camera clubs and emerged as an accomplished street photographer. Unlike Henri Cartier-Bresson who favoured the 35mm Leica, Williams worked with a square format twin lens Rolleicord, in this period to capture the essence of Sydney's urban environment and beach culture, cropping the results to a rectangular format, though later he was to realise the value of reprinting these images full-frame.

=== Europe ===
In 1965, Williams embarked on an overland journey to London with his first wife, Rosemary Simpson. London served as a base for extensive European travel over the next five years. His photographic practice during this period involved days spent capturing images, followed by evenings at camping grounds reading about the history of the places he had visited.

=== Return to Australia ===
When Williams reluctantly returned to Australia in 1969, both he and the country had undergone significant changes. His photographs from this period documented both the transformations in Australian society and what remained unchanged. This coincided with a period when film, theatre, and visual arts were becoming established as legitimate professional pursuits for Australians, with new educational institutions being formed to support these fields.

Within five years of his return, photography had experienced a boom in Australia, with Williams well positioned for this development. He contributed to the field by reviewing for photography magazines and newspapers while also teaching photography through Workers' Educational Association (WEA) courses.

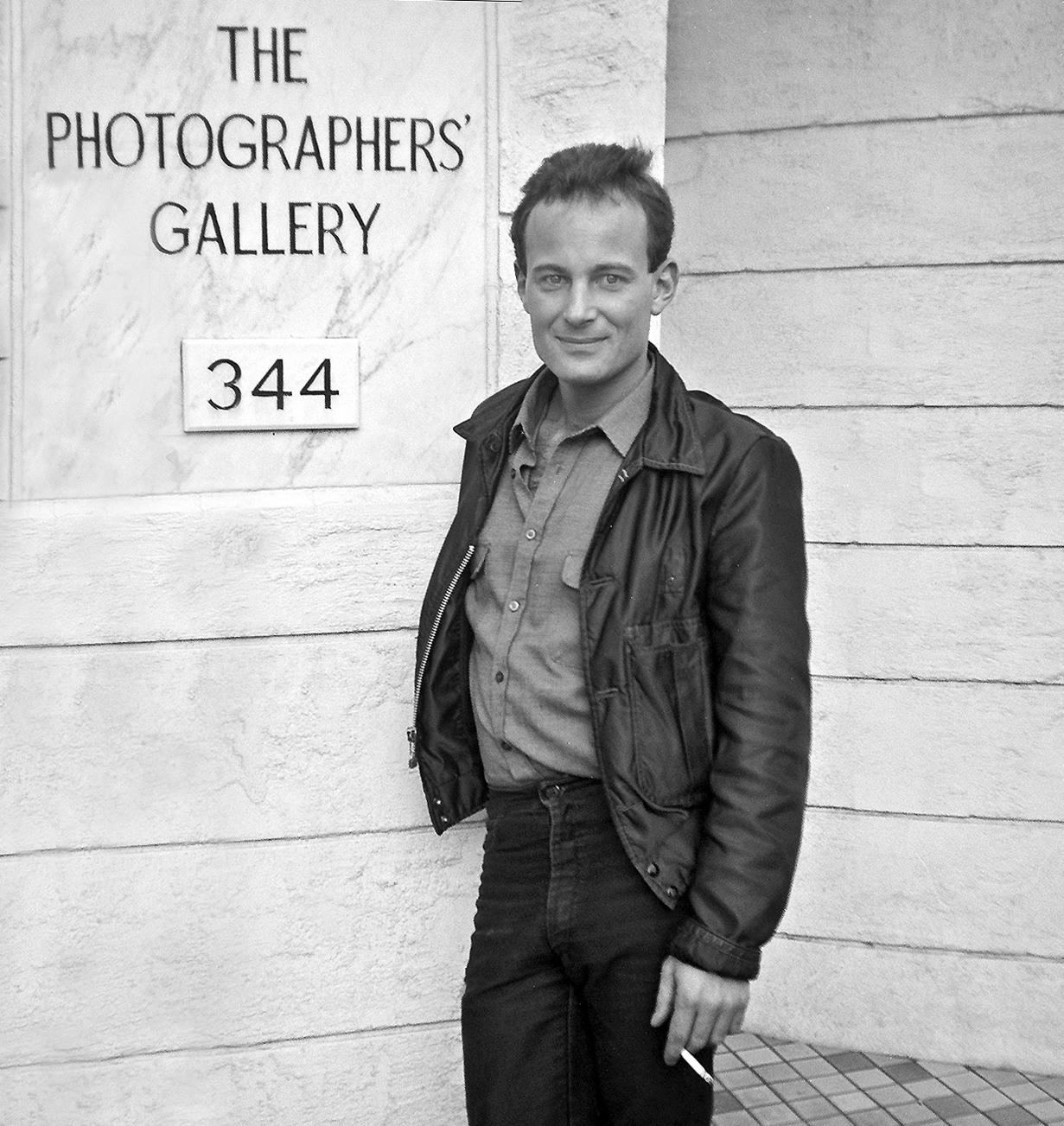
William Heimerman director of The Photographers' Gallery and Workshop at the door of the gallery, photographed by Jeff Busby, c.1980

In Melbourne, in 1973, Williams, with Paul Cox, Ingeborg Tyssen, and Rod McNicol founded The Photographers' Gallery and Workshop at 344 Punt Road, South Yarra in the 1888 two-storey 'Sharp's Buildings' terrace, rented since 1965 as a photographer's studio and accommodation by Paul Cox, who from 1969–1980 taught cinematography at Prahran College.

It was the second gallery devoted to photography to be established in the city after Rennie Ellis' and Robert Ashton's Brummels Gallery (running 1972–1980) less than a kilometre away, and before Joyce Evans' Church Street Photography Centre in neighbouring Richmond (1976).

Williams traveled again on a 1974 $A1,200 Australia Council grant for a study tour to Europe and USA.

Ennis notes that Williams was one who aimed 'to simply record the things which interest me' and "went so far as to relate his printing style in 1974 to what he perceived as the Australian experience," and quotes his statement:

My prints are rough, hard and grainy which is just what Sydney is like. The light is fierce, the summers hot and humid, the bush inhuman and the population complacently cruel enough to accept two decades of flabby self-congratulatory ignorance, cushioned and smothered by the soft folds of the Menzies arse.

=== Innovations ===
In 1977 Williams moved from 'human interest' photography of the 1960s with a series of stark, fill-flash street photographs, shot from the hip in a semi-random manner, which emphasise the disorientation and alienation of urban thoroughfares. The work was shown in a survey, A Decade of Australian Photography 1972-1982 : Philip Morris Arts Grant at the National Gallery of Australia in 1983.

A new series that Williams commenced in 1979, the Living Room Portraits, are 360º 'joiner' panoramas that survey an entire room, with one frame occupied by the human subject. His 1981 show of these at the Australian Centre for Photography was reviewed by Max Dupain:

The apparent objects of the exercise, the people, are swallowed up in the engulfing domestic paraphernalia. The part is certainly not greater than the whole, and the character of the people is only partially discernible from their own images as they confront the camera full on. You have to sift through their possessions to understand their makeup. It is personality by proxy.

Arthur McIntyre in Art and Australia of 1982 remarked that Williams' "multiple image 'panoramas' of people in domestic environments were dazzling achievements that satisfied visually and cerebrally."

Williams and his partner Tyssen were granted residencies in Paris at the Cité Internationale des Arts in the late 1980s and again on two occasions in the 1990s. After he had toured European theatres of the First World War, in a 1984 group exhibition Williams superimposed images of Australian soldiers over maps of the battle sites to emphasise individual experience within sweeping historical events. Critic Hinderaker observed that "the portraits, like the maps, are curiously mute and schematic, fragments of the mysteries of fate in unknown landscapes." This material formed part of Williams MVA competed in 1985 at the Sydney College of the Arts where he was head of Department.

McDonald, noting humanism and humour in Williams' 1989 AGNSW retrospective marking the end of his teaching career, wrote that he was:

...no respecter of photographic conventions. He began as a documentary photographer but has since expanded the parameters of his work to take in sequential photographs, formal portraits, street snapshots using elements of chance and montages blending historical and new images. He has been a consistent innovator, but his experiments have been tightly structured around themes like: time in photography, urban alienation, social hierarchies and rituals, the workings of history and memory in the construction of identity.

== Critic and commentator 1971–1988 ==
Williams contributed regular reviews of photography for The Australian 1973–1977, and occasional reviews of books on photography and photographers for publications including The Age. He edited and contributed to Camera Graphics magazine from 1971 to 1974 and Photography News between 1972 and 1974.

In the journal Art and Australia of Winter 1976, Williams offers a critical survey of the development of Australian photography between 1920 and 1960, into which he himself had entered, via his analysis of Max Dupain and David Moore distinction within an otherwise derivative and uninspired national photographic culture, shaped predominantly by commercial practices and camera club pictorialism that emulated English models, but disengaged from Australian social realities. Williams situates this domestic stagnation against the backdrop of an international "Golden Age" of photography—of Edward Weston, Paul Strand, and Henri Cartier-Bresson—during which the medium underwent significant redefinition while Australian photography remained largely under the control of affluent amateurs, commercial studios, and newspaper photographers' sanitised and optimistic imagery. He notes that the Australian public’s "'incomprehension" of Steichen’s Family of Man exhibition further illustrates this cultural detachment. As global photography evolved in response to the complexities of modern life, particularly through the work of Robert Frank and the emergence of television, Moore’s practice similarly advanced, demonstrating a heightened sensitivity to environment and subject.

== Academic career 1976–1989 ==
In 1976, Williams was appointed as the foundation head of photography and film at the newly established Sydney College of the Arts in Sydney. This position formalised his role as an influential figure in Australian photography education, cemented by his vigorous promotion of this branch of applied pedagogy in the press, defending it from detractors with support from his own research and data. Graduates from the courses included Judith Ahern, Jack Redgate, Debra Phillips, Ken Heyes and Anne Zahalka.

Writing in Light Vision in 1978, Williams critiques the contemporary Australian scene as "aesthetically obsessed, intellectually weak", and "self-indulgent", lamenting photography being practiced "for its own sake", driven by technique and style rather than communication, with too many idolisers of American photographers like Edward Weston and Aaron Siskind focussing more on aesthetic perfection than on substance. Expressing his belief that photography should be "a tool to express ideas, ask questions, and convey information", he asserts that "great photographers like Jacob Riis, August Sander, and Robert Frank" were driven by "*ideas, purpose, and social commentary", not a desire to be accepted as artists. Qualifying his reference to Edward Weston, Williams sees him as someone who used photography to "question concepts of beauty" and challenge visual norms—not just as a perfectionist technician. In Williams' own work, a series illustrated in the magazine on urban transport, cars and car shows, he reflects his "pessimism about the future" in themes of "isolation, environmental decay, and man's disconnection from himself" and the "motor car as a symbol of extinction". He values the "unexpected results and accidents in photography", which keep the medium alive and interesting for him.

After twelve years in tertiary education, Williams chose to leave academic life, taking early retirement in 1988. His decision allowed him to focus on his historical writing and other personal pursuits. He was however to teach again, part-time, in art history at the National Art School, East Sydney c.1994–1999.

== Writing Australian history 1988–2016 ==
Following his retirement from academia, in 1992 Williams completed a PhD dissertation The mechanics of a cultural quarantine: Australia & modernism 1913-1919, which was the basis of his first book, Quarantined Culture (1995), which examined Australia's cultural shift from what he perceived as a dynamic pre-war cosmopolitan environment to an anxious, inward-looking nation in the post-war period. Doyle, in reviewing the work, praises Williams clarity and research in demonstrating that Modernism, which elsewhere was endemic, in Australia was 'quarantined' after WWI by cultural, military, and artistic elites, personified by the attitudes of Lionel and Norman Lindsay, James Stuart MacDonald, Charles Bean and their nationalism, class consciousness, antisemitism, gender bias which results in their anti-modernist sentiment, and a widespread conviction that the modern movement was a threat to traditional values. The reviewer commends Williams' original insights, especially regarding the so-called "lost generation" and the interplay between military, cultural, and economic forces in shaping Australian identity. Docherty values the book for its "long overdue account of the effect of censorship on Australia's culture," while historian Frank Bongiorno highlights its exposure of the inordinate influence of "Edwardian leftovers" the Lindsays and the "cynical use of immigration law [specifically the White Australia policy] used to keep a frightening world at bay."

Williams went on to author six books largely focused on World War I and its impact on Australian society. His 1999 Anzacs, the Media and the Great War covers the history of Australian military-media relations with a particular focus on World Wars I, II, the Vietnam War and the fighting in Afghanistan.

His later works continued to explore themes of memory and identity through historical analysis, including people of German origin, their internment and experiences of those who fought in the war on behalf of Australia, and the shifting attitudes to people of German origin in specific communities.

Reviewing German Anzacs and the First World War John Milfull writes:

This is the kind of history John Williams writes, and I admire it enormously. Against a panorama of the social and military history of Australian participation in WWI, laid out with authoritative sweep and competence, he zooms in, fine photographer that he is, on the unexpected details and life stories others miss or neglect. In this case the focus is the paradoxical situation of German Australians who fought on the Aussie side against their former compatriots.

Williams' Corporal Hitler and the Great War 1914-1918: the List Regiment is widely cited.

In addition to his books, Williams was known for his slide-based monologues presented internationally. These presentations combined his skills as a historian and photographer to offer unique insights into cultural memory, one being a talk Shoot!: Photography and War that he gave at the AGNSW on 6 December 2000.

Williams' approach to historical writing was informed by his photographic background, bringing a visual sensibility to his analysis of historical events. His final book, Deutschland über Allah! Germany, Gallipoli and The Great War, was in press at the time of his death.

== Personal life ==
Williams married three times. His first marriage was to Rosemary Simpson, with whom he traveled to Europe in 1965. During his time teaching photography courses, he met his second wife, Ingeborg Tyssen, a Dutch-born nurse who had immigrated to Australia as a child. Tyssen was herself a talented photographer who collaborated with Williams in establishing The Photographers Gallery in Melbourne in 1974, alongside Paul Cox and Rod McNichol.

Williams described himself as "a displaced Anglo-Celt who sees Mitteleuropa as a kind of spiritual home", a cultural identification reflected his intellectual interests and historical focus.

In 2002, Williams experienced a profound personal tragedy when Ingeborg was killed in an accident in The Netherlands. This loss deeply affected him, as he described it as having "shattered" his bearings. He presented a discussion of her life and work in February 2012 at Monash Gallery of Art (now Museum of Australian Photography).

In the final decade of his life, Williams married Jean Curthoys, with whom he relocated to Hobart, Tasmania.

== Death and legacy ==
John Williams died on 30 July 2016, in Hobart, Tasmania, in the company of his wife Jean Curthoys. His legacy encompasses his contributions to Australian photography as both a practitioner and educator, as well as his historical writings that examined the cultural impact of World War I on Australian society.

Williams' work as an educator helped establish photography as a serious academic discipline in Australia through his leadership at Sydney College of the Arts. His photographs documenting Sydney in the 1960s provide an important visual record of urban Australian life during a period of significant social change.

== Qualifications ==
- BSc Tech (Mechanical Engineering) University of NSW
- 1985: MA Visual Arts, Sydney College of the Arts
- 1992: PhD Modern History, Macquarie University

== Exhibitions ==
=== Solo ===
- 1981: Living Room Portraits, Australian Centre for Photography, Sydney
- 1982: Living Room Portraits, Christine Abrahams Gallery, Melbourne
- 1983: Living Room Portraits, Gallery A1, Tokyo
- 1984: Finding Time, Christine Abrahams Gallery, Melbourne
- 1985: From the Flatlands, Australian Centre for Photography, Sydney
- 1986: From the Flatlands, as part of the exhibition Flanders Then and Now, Australian War Memorial, Canberra
- 1989: 11 August to 24 September: John Williams Photographs, (retrospective) Art Gallery of New South Wales
- 1991: John Williams Photographs, (retrospective) National Gallery of Victoria
- 1995: Traces 1916-18 - 1988-95, Alliance Française de Sydney
- 1995: Traces 1916-18 - 1988-95, Byron-Mapp, Sydney
- 1997: Twenty Years on the Street: John Williams photographs, 1958-78, Byron-Mapp, Sydney
- 1998: Australian Correspondences, John Williams, photograph australien, Historial de la Grande Guerre. Péronne, France
- 1999: Portrait of the Month, National Portrait Gallery, Old Parliament House, Canberra
- 2004: John Williams. Sydney Diary 1958-2003. Museum of Sydney

=== Group ===
- 1975: John Williams and Richard Harris joint exhibition
- 1981, 25 July–23 August: Project 38: Reconstructed Vision, Contemporary Work with Photography
- 1983: Continuum 83, 13 Australian Artists in Japan
- 1983–84: 8 October – 29 January: A Decade of Australian Photography 1972 – 1982: Philip Morris Arts Grant at the Australian National Gallery
- 1984: Segmentations, Friends of Photography, Carmel, Calif., USA.
- 1984: Photography collection on display, National Portrait Gallery, Canberra.
- 1984, October: The Lady Warwick Fairfax Photography Awards, Art Gallery of New South Wales
- 1986: Flanders then and now, Australian War Memorial
- 1986: The 1970s, Art Gallery of NSW, Sydney
- 1994, 22 April–10 July: Critic's Choice, Art Gallery of New South Wales, Sydney
- 1994–5, 21 December–13 February: Sydney Photographed, Museum of Contemporary Art, Sydney.
- 1996: From the Street, Art Gallery of News South Wales, Sydney
- 1999: Recent Acquisitions, National Portrait Gallery, Old Parliament House, Canberra. 1999
- 2014, 8 Feb-18 May: Australian Vernacular Photography:The Allure of the Everyday, Jeff Carter, Ed Douglas, Peter Elliston, Gerrit Fokkema, Sue Ford, Fiona Hall, Robert McFarlane, Hal Missingham, David Moore, Trent Parke, Roger Scott, Glenn Sloggett, Ingeborg Tyssen, John F Williams, William Yang, Anne Zahalka Art Gallery of NSW
- 2004, 12 June–08 August: Australian documentary photography after 1946, Art Gallery of NSW.
- 2024, 23 February - 20 October: Thresholds with Beth Peters, Cornelia Parker, Gordon Bennett, Harold Cazneaux, Ingeborg Tyssen, Ioulia Panoutsopoulos, John Frank Williams, Juan Davila, Justine Varga, Karen Black, Kate Smith, Laurie Wilson, Max Dupain, Matthew Griffin, Olive Cotton, Pegg Clarke, Rob McLeish, Roger Scott, Tracey Moffatt, Trent Parke, TV Moore. Murray Art Museum Albury

== Publications ==
- Williams, John F. (1995). The quarantined culture : Australian reactions to modernism, 1913-1939. Cambridge University Press. ISBN 978-0-521-47713-0.
- Williams, John F. (1999). ANZACS, the media and the Great War. UNSW Press. ISBN 978-0-86840-569-8.
- Williams, John Frank (2003). German Anzacs and the First World War. Sydney: University of New South Wales Press. ISBN 978-0-86840-508-7.
- Williams, John Frank (2005). Corporal Hitler and the Great War 1914-1918 : the List Regiment (1st ed.). London: Frank Cass. ISBN 978-0-415-35854-5.
- Williams, John F. (2004). Line zero, photo-reportage 1958-2003. Sydney: University of New South Wales Press. ISBN 9780868404875.
- Williams, John F. (2016). Deutschland über Allah! Germany, Gallipoli and The Great War. North Melbourne: Australian Scholarly Publishing. ISBN 9781925003529.

== Grants and awards ==
- 1981: Art Gallery of NSW. Lady Warwick Fairfax Prize for photographic portraiture
- 1994: Australian Army Research Grant. Research for Anzacs, the Media and the Great War
- 1998: Australia Council, Visual Arts Board. Special projects grant for exhibition at Historial
- 1997–8: Goethe Insitut, München. Stipendium (German language scholarship)
- 1998: Australia Council, Visual Arts Board. Two-year fellowship to fund and develop art practice
- 2000: Centenary of the Council of Federation (German Anzacs in World War One)
- 1999-98: Australian War Memorial (German Anzacs in World War One)
- 2002: Army Research Grant. German Attitudes and mentality in World War One

== Collections ==
- George Eastman House, International Museum of Photography, Rochester, NY, USA.
- Bibliotheque Nationale, Paris.
- Historial de la Grande Guerre, Péronne.
- National Portrait Gallery, Canberra
- Australian Parliament House.
- National Gallery of Australia
- Art Gallery of New South Wales
- National Gallery of Victoria
- Art Gallery of South Australia
- Art Gallery of Western Australia
- Tasmanian Museum and Gallery
- Murray Art Museum Albury

== Academic posts ==
- 1988-76: Sydney College of the Arts, (Foundation Head, Dept of Photography, Film and Audio-Visual Studies)
- 1994-98: National Art School, East Sydney (part-time lecturer in art history)
- 1998: Visiting Fellow, School of Germanic Studies, University of New South Wales
- 1998-95: Visiting Research Fellow, School of History, Macquarie University
- 1999: Hon. Research Associate, Dept of Germanic Studies, University of Sydney
