= Merle Hathaway =

English-born Australian museum curator (born 1948)

- Born: 1948 (age 77–78); Wing, Buckinghamshire
- Education: Wendouree Primary School, Ballarat High School, Ballarat School of Mines, Prahran Technical College, Hawthorn Teachers College
- Alma mater: Federation University
- Occupations: museum curator, exhibition curator, art advisor and project manager, gallery director
- Years active: 1980–present
- Known for: Director of Horsham Regional Art Gallery
- Political party: Independent
- Spouse: Michael Young (m. 1970; div. 1990)
- Parents: Stanley Hathaway (father); Lucy (née Simmons) Hathaway (mother)
- Family: Hazel
- Awards: 2020: Distinguished Alumna, Federation University

Merle Hathaway is an English-born Australian museum curator, exhibition curator, art advisor and project manager, active since 1980, and former gallery director.

== Early life and migration ==
Merle Hathaway was born in 1948 to sewing machine sales representative Lucy (nee Simmons) and mechanical engineer Stanley Hathaway, in Wing, Buckinghamshire where the couple and first child Hazel had moved from Coventry, having survived the bombing of that city in World War II. From 1946–1951 they moved again to New Forest and Ringwood in Hampshire and caravanned around the country while they awaited their successful application for the Assisted Passage Migration Scheme to emigrate to Australia.

The family left England on 17 November 1951 and arrived in New South Wales where they were initially housed in the migrant camp at Bathurst, then Ballarat Migrant Hostel. Six months later they had bought land and lived in a caravan while building their first house, in the new suburb of Wendouree.

Lucy Hathaway was for 17 years Supervisor of McCallum House, while Stanley Hathaway worked as a fitter and turner. Both were heavily involved in community activities. Losing their jobs in Ballarat, the family moved to Melbourne in 1969, buying a house in Northcote, enlarged and restored by Stanley Hathaway. Merle attended Prahran Technical College for the last six months of her 3rd year Diploma of Art. After their retirement Merle's parents also moved to Buninyong, where they built a cedar log cabin kit home. Her father died in 1990 and her mother in 2009.

== Education and training ==
Merle attended Wendouree Primary School and Ballarat High School before studying art at the Ballarat School of Mines 1967–68 where she majored in sculpture with ceramics and photography as minor subjects. During this time she joined the Ballarat Fine Art Gallery as a member and as a volunteer assisted director James Mollison with exhibition displays.

When the family moved to Melbourne she studied at Prahran Technical College in 1969 for six months, majoring in sculpture.

In 1970 Merle married minimalist sculptor Michael Young, and for three years they travelled Europe, North Africa and Turkey, visiting museums, galleries, architectural and archeological sites. They returned to Australia in early 1973, settling in Buninyong, and Merle resumed and completed her diploma in 1973.

In 1973 they bought and began restoring a 19th century bluestone brewery in Buninyong. Inspired by London's ICA, they founded Gallery Link (1973-4), a youth activities group at Ballarat Fine Art Gallery. As Coordinators they organised plays, concerts, lectures, films, poetry readings & other events at the Gallery. They also both were active assistants for Director Ron Radford, and Merle photographed for Gallery catalogues.

Merle studied for a Diploma of Education at Hawthorn Teachers College and began teaching at Sebastopol Technical School (1974–1980). The Education Department seconded her as art consultant for the Central Highlands. (1981–1990) combining the role with that of Education Officer at Ballarat Fine Art Gallery.

== Ballarat ==
In the mid 1980s Hathaway coordinated Ballarat's inaugural Next Wave Festival. She then travelled to attend museum education conferences in Paris, Hamburg and London. She surveyed the education programs in Scandinavia, France, Germany and England of over 124 museums. On return, with fellow Community Arts Officer the artist Paul Mason, Merle established Ballarat Arts Umbrella in 1989 in which she served as secretary. When the Arts Officer positions came under threat, and agitation to establish the Mining Exchange as an arts venue had failed. In 1990 they set up Artworks gallery in an old butchers shop in Humffray Street, rented to them for $44 per week, partly funded through Ballarat Arts Umbrella for which Merle also negotiated from the city council, with support from councillor Cath Laffey, a loan of $2,000 repayable over 3 years. Administration was managed by Sarah Sanders, Linda Blake and Anne Roberts and exhibitions were staged by artists including Jennifer Marshall, Dean Bowen, Daniel Moynihan, John Neeson, Rosemary Eagle, Kath Hardy, Loris Button and Rosalind Lawson.

Hathaway was Ballarat Community Arts officer over five years until 1991, during which time she ran a series of arts workshops for the over fifties, with groups convening to discuss the collection and join in practical sessions in various media, wrote An Introductory Tour: Suggestions for Teachers (1988), A Walking Tour Near the Gallery (1990), provided both text and illustrations for Yarrowee Walk (1991), and coordinated the 1990 Ballarat Next Wave Youth Arts Festival.

In 1991 at the beginning of ten years part-time appointment as education officer at the Art Gallery of Ballarat, Hathaway was active in the Ballarat Arts Industry Council Steering Committee, newly formed to advise and lobby local, State and Federal Governments and liaise with industry and the community. An emphasis was to support the arts in Ballarat by developing a Council policy and raise funds. Toward this end Hathaway organised an auction of artworks and collectibles at the gallery in July 1991 in support of the Ballarat Arts Development Fund.

Hathaway was curator/educator for the Dromkeen Children’s Literature Collection, then Over 1993-4 Hathaway coordinated Arts in the Park in the Ballarat Botanic Gardens; curated a Ballarat Sculpture Festival; directed the Strategic Arts: Live Chess Game; established the Central Highlands Arts Register; and coordinated Days of Discovery with Ballarat Tourism.

Exhibitions which Hathaway curated at the Ballarat Art Gallery included a schools project Maskarade (1989), and Chris Nicholls' paintings (1997).

== Horsham Regional Art Gallery ==
Merle Hathaway was appointed to the Horsham Regional Art Gallery in February 1995, became its Director in 1997, a position she continued until 2008 and was cofounder and Chair of Horsham Regional Arts Association. At HRAG she instituted a regular newsletter, and oversaw a program of exhibitions inclusive of artists in a wide range of disciplines, including: six ceramicists in Painting in the Round (1995); designer Richard Beck (20 March–21 April 1996); the historical exhibition Getting Together (1997); Time and timelessness in archival permanence: 100 years of Australian photography (7 February–16 March 1997); painter Neil Douglas (1997); Phiction: lies, illusion and the phantasm in photography (touring the collection to eleven Victorian venues); Wimmera 2002: second national exhibition of photography (16 July– September 2002); Joseph Brown (2007); and photographer Charles Page; won in 1995 a Local Government Award, Best Management of a Cultural Facility; and achieved Museum Accreditation status for the gallery, as only the second in Victoria, which enabled the gallery to receive loans of work from major institutions including the National Gallery of Australia. A specialisation that Hathaway continued from the initiative of her predecessor Jean Davidson in the gallery's collecting, with the assistance of Joyce Evans, was photography, an imperative which persists after Hathaway moved on in 2008, so that gallery holds one of the more notable photography collections in Australia, and continues to exhibit work by significant Australian photographic artists

Subsequently, Hathaway became Executive Officer of the Public Galleries Association of Victoria.

== Buninyong ==
In 1974 Hathaway and her then husband Michael Young had purchased the 1850s bluestone brewery in Bunninyong, 12 km from the centre of Ballarat. The Buninyong and District News of May 2003 recounts the history of the brewery, and notes:

Michael and Merle Young, née Hathaway, on returning from a European working holiday, bought what remained of the Brewery and the adjoining land. Their first job was to build somewhere to live, which they did by making a derelict building in a comer of the grounds into a comfortable little cottage, while still finding time to gradually restore the Old Brewery Building. When Michael and Merle decided to go their separate ways, Merle stayed on and continued the good work.

With the building restored Merle, a constant supporter and frequent patron of the arts, held a continuing program of public concerts of jazz, classical and traditional music, in several of which she also performs on wind instruments, and participated in and led community activities and the Buninyong Festival, winning a prize in the 'Futuristic Fashion Competition' in the festival's 1987 iteration.

On her return to live in Buninyong from her position at Horsham in 2010, in October Hathaway held a concert by two acapella groups, Damask from Melbourne, and Ballarat's Singers of the Black Book, and an instrumental group of recorder, guitar, and Northumbrian pipes performing music both contemporary and from the 10th century and Renaissance, to raise funds for Friends of Buninyong Botanic Gardens and the Asylum Seeker Resource Centre.

Hathaway became involved in promoting tourism to Buninyong through its Progress Association, attending key meetings with Ballarat representatives in 2011. In 2012 the Golden Plains Shire appointed Hathaway as Arts and Culture officer. In 2016, Merle stood as an Independent in the local government elections.

== Recent activity ==
Since 2010 Merle Hathaway, has volunteered with the Ballarat International Foto Biennale, and since 2017 with the Royal South Street Society, the Ballarat Soup Bus and the Art Advisory Council of Wildlife Art Museum Australia. She performed with Operating her freelance business The Artist's Cat., she is commissioned to write submissions, media releases, catalogues and provides curatorial services for artists and artist's estates. Among her activities in this enterprise she has co-ordinated a retrospective of his photography by John Williams (2018, at Magnet Galleries), and four exhibitions and two publications by her fellow alumni, the photography students of Prahran College, for the Prahran Legacy project team.

== Selected publications ==
=== Books and catalogues ===
- Contributor to Dover, Barbara, ed. (1987). Art works. Curriculum Branch, Ministry of Education (Schools Division). ISBN 978-0-7241-7591-8.
- Hathaway, Merle (1995). Painting in the round : the work of six Australian artists who use ceramics as a three-dimensional canvas for painting. Horsham Regional Art Gallery.
- Beck, Richard; Hathaway, Merle (1996). Richard Beck : designer/photographer : the first survey of this important British/Australian Designer. Horsham Regional Art Gallery.
- Hathaway, Merle; Horsham Art Gallery (1997). Getting together : the art of socialising in days gone by. Horsham Regional Art Gallery.
- Brown, Joseph; Hathaway, Merle, (curator.), Merle; Morrison, Gordon (2007). Joseph Brown: the artist. Horsham Regional Art Gallery. OCLC 1038062046.
- Page, Charles J.; Hathaway, Merle; Kirker, Anne (2007). Cross section : the documentary photography of Charles J. Page. C. Page. ISBN 978-0-9803148-1-6.
- Douglas, Neil; Hathaway, Merle; Horsham Art Gallery (1997). Neil Douglas retrospective. Horsham Regional Art Gallery.
- Hathaway, Merle; Nicholls, Chris (2013). Chris Nicholls: Landscapes of the mind. Art Gallery of Ballarat.
- Hathaway, Merle; Cozzolino, Mimmo (2025). McArdle, James (ed.). Long Exposure : Legacy of Prahran College, (2025 Ballarat Foto Biennale) (1st ed.). Mimmo Cozzolino. ISBN 978-0-9872498-2-1.

=== Articles ===
- Hathaway, Merle (November 1994). "Dromkeen: an Australian gallery for children's book illustration". Orana. 30 (4): 268–273. ISSN 0045-6705. OCLC 9068961924.
- Hathaway, Merle (2 August 2010) "Review: Human Interest Story", artsHub, Theatre and Dance Platform

=== Video ===
- Research and interview for Somerville-Smith, Leonie (2000), Neil Douglas: the feather in the flood, Somerville-Smith

== Awards ==
- 2020: Distinguished Alumna, Federation University.
