= Guy Grey-Smith =

Western Australian artist (1916–1981)

- Guy Grey-Smith 1947 Selfportrait drawing & watercolour
- Born: 7 January 1916; Wagin, Western Australia, Australia
- Died: 11 August 1981 (aged 65); Western Australia, Australia
- Known for: Painting, printmaking and ceramics

Guy Grey-Smith AM (7 January 1916 – 11 August 1981 (aged 65)) was an Australian painter, printmaker and ceramicist. Grey-Smith pioneered modernism in Western Australia, and has been described as "one of Australia's most significant artists of the 20th century".

== Biography ==
=== Early life ===
Guy Grey-Smith, the second son of Francis Edward Grey-Smith, station manager, and his wife Ada Janet (née King) was born in Wagin, Western Australia in 1916.

=== Military service ===
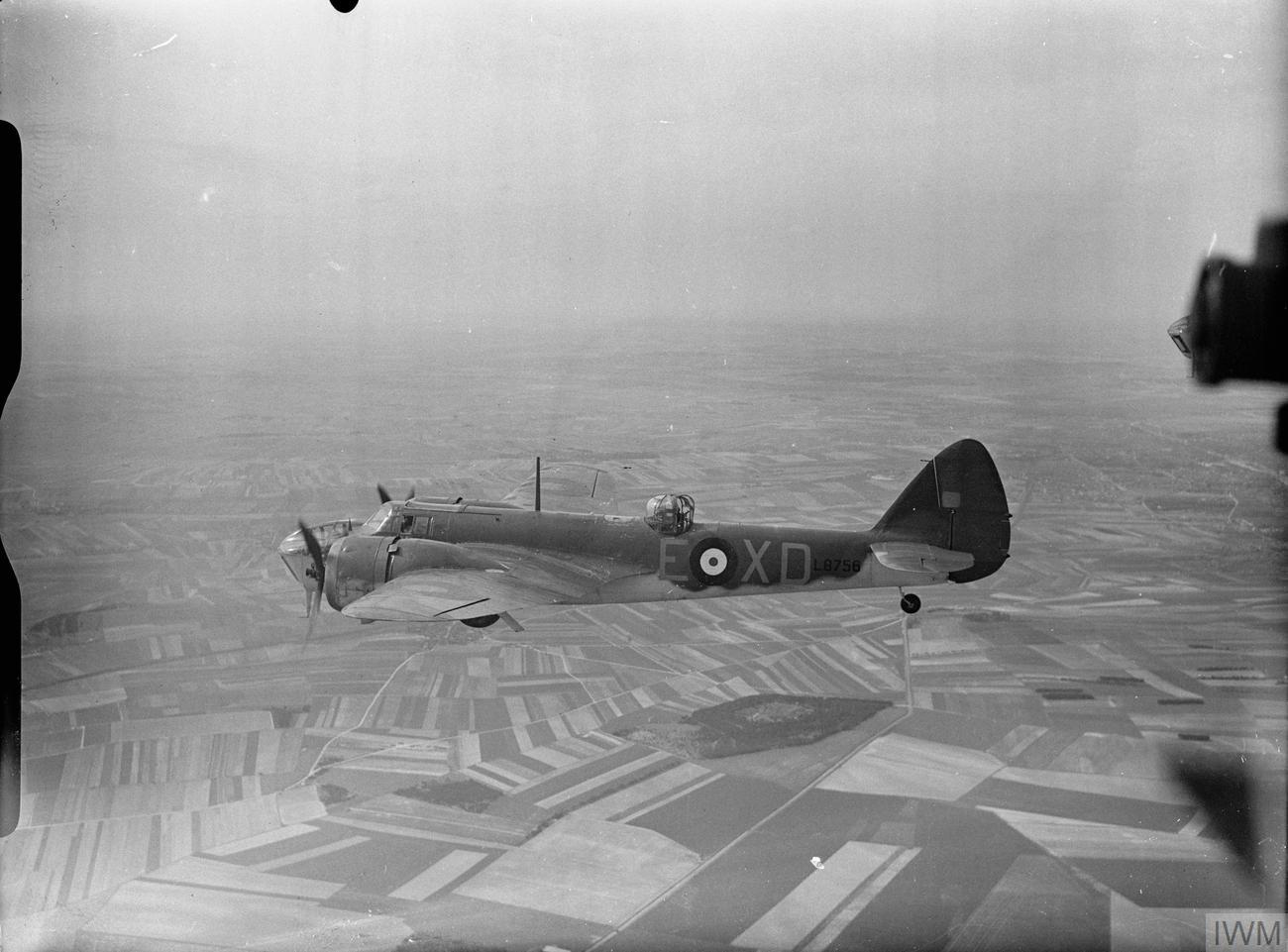
A Bristol Blenheim belonging to Guy Grey-Smith's squadron, over France in 1940.

He joined the Royal Australian Air Force (RAAF) when he was 20 and trained as a pilot. In 1937, he transferred to the British Royal Air Force (RAF) on a Short Service Commission and moved to England. He married an Englishwoman, Helen Dorothy Stanes, at Godmanchester on 19 October 1939.

After the outbreak of World War II, he served with No. 139 Squadron RAF, and flew Bristol Blenheim bombers during the Battle of France, with the rank of Flying Officer On 12 May 1940, the squadron was stationed at Plivot and undertook a mission to attack German positions near Maastricht and Tongeren, in the Netherlands. Grey-Smith's aircraft (N6219) was attacked by a Messerschmitt Bf 109 fighter and caught fire. As he parachuted out of the stricken bomber, Grey-Smith was hit by the tailplane and received severe head injuries, but landed safely. He was captured and kept at Stalag Luft III as a prisoner of war. During his time as POW, Grey-Smith began to explore an interest in art, with materials sent by his wife. He contracted tuberculosis and, as a consequence, was repatriated to the UK in 1944 for treatment, which included art therapy.

=== Artistic career ===
In 1945, he began studying at the Chelsea School of Art. Grey-Smith attended the school until 1947, learning from Ceri Richards, Robert Medley and Henry Moore. He and Helen returned to Western Australia and set up a pottery studio at their home in Darlington.

In 1952, his tuberculosis recurred, and upon recovery eight months later, he and Helen moved back to London. He studied fresco painting at the Central School of Arts and Crafts under Louis le Brocquy until 1954. Upon their return to Australia, Grey-Smith worked for the Education Department and Art Gallery before journeying across the Nullarbor and to the north-west of Western Australia, which inspired his work.

In 1966, Grey-Smith became inaugural president of the Contemporary Art Society (WA Branch).

=== Death ===
He died at the age of 65 from a recurrence of tuberculosis, in August 1981.

== Artwork and recognition ==
He formed the Perth Group in the late 1950s with fellow artists Robert Juniper Brian McKay, Tom Gibbons and Maurice Stubbs. The group's aim was to promote European modernism, which was not yet accepted in Australia. Grey-Smith was influenced by Cézanne, English constructionist painters, Nicolas de Staël and the Western Australian landscape. He travelled throughout the state, including the Kimberley, Pilbara, Goldfields and South West regions, drawing and making notes in order to produce larger works back in his studio.

At the time of his death, his work was increasingly achieving recognition and is held in high regard today. In December 2007, Christie's auctioned one of his landscape paintings with an estimate of £1500 to £2500. The painting sold for £29,300 (A$64,000). According to art collector Max Grunberg, Grey-Smith paintings sold at a large auction during the 1990s for $18,000 to $20,000 would now sell for at least $40,000 to $45,000.

He won the Perth Prize for best Western Australian entry in 1955 and 1963, and the Perth Prize in 1964. In 1959, he was awarded the Murdoch Prize, and the Robin Hood Art Prize in 1962

He received the St George's Cathedral Prize in 1966 and 1967, and the Walter Murdoch Prize in 1967 and 1968.

Grey-Smith was honoured with a Special Distinguished Artist and Scholar Grant from the Australia Council for the Arts in 1973 and an Order of Australia in 1981.

In 2012, a new biography of the artist by Andrew Gaynor was published.

== Selected exhibitions ==
- 1957 Brummels Gallery, Melbourne.
- 1961 Recent Australian Painting (group show) Whitechapel Gallery, London, UK June 1961 - July 1961

== Selected posthumous exhibitions ==
Solo:

- 2014 Guy Grey-Smith: Art As Life - Art Gallery of Western Australia, Perth, WA
- 2006 Guy Grey Smith - Goddard de Fiddes Gallery, West Perth, WA
- 2001 Guy Grey-Smith - Goddard de Fiddes Gallery, West Perth, WA
- 1997 Guy Grey-Smith - Goddard de Fiddes Gallery, West Perth, WA

Group:

- 2011Vast: North-West landscapes - Art Gallery of Western Australia, Perth, WA
- 2010 Tom Collins, and after: a bequest and its legacy - The University of Western Australia, Crawley WA
- Miscellanea - Tim Olsen Gallery, Sydney, NSW
- LandSpace - Goddard de Fiddes Gallery, West Perth, WA
- 2008 Style and Synthesis: Nine Australian moderns - The University of Western Australia, Crawley WA
- 2005 Space - Goddard de Fiddes Gallery, West Perth, WA
- 2000 GdeF Group show - Goddard de Fiddes Gallery, West Perth, WA
