= Joyce Evans (photographer) =

Australian photographer (1929–2019)

Joyce Olga Evans
- Born: 21 December 1929; Elsternwick, Australia
- Died: 20 April 2019 (aged 89); Melbourne, Australia

Joyce Olga Evans OAM, B.A., Dip. Soc. Stud. (21 December 1929 – 20 April 2019) was an Australian photographer active as an amateur from the 1950s and professional photographic artist from the 1980s, director of the Church Street Photography Centre in Melbourne (1976–1982), art curator and collector, and tertiary photography lecturer.

== Early work ==
Evans was presented with a Leica camera by her wealthy father and her earliest surviving photography is from 1949 to 1951 and records marches, demonstrations and youth events including the 1949 May Day March; the 2nd World Festival of Youth and Students, Budapest, 1949; and the Melbourne University Labour Club participating in demonstrations in 1951. She studied painting with John Olsen at the Bakery Art School, Sydney in 1967/1968, but much later 'fell in love' with photography at the Basel Art Fair, which led first to a career as a gallerist, then as a practicing photographer.

== Church Street Photographic Centre ==
In 1976 Evans opened Church Street Photographic Centre, a specialist photography gallery and bookshop in Church Street, Richmond, Victoria. It was the third commercial photographic gallery in 1970s Melbourne to open after Brummels (1972) and The Photographers Gallery (1973) and showcased International 19th and 20th Century photography including Berenice Abbott, Eugène Atget, Julia Margaret Cameron, Henri Cartier-Bresson, Imogen Cunningham, Elllott Erwitt, Robert Frank, Hill and Adamson, André Kertész, Les Krims, Martin Lacis, James Newberry, Arnold Newman, Bill Owens, Jan Saudek, W. Eugene Smith, Frederick Sommer, Alfred Stieglitz, Paul Strand, Jerry Uelsmann, Brett Weston, and Minor White.

Significant Australians were also shown, including Venise Alstergren, Robert Ashton, John Cato, Max Dupain, Rennie Ellis, John Gollings, Laurence Le Guay, Fiona Hall, Bill Henson, Frank Hurley, David Moore, Athol Shmith and Mark Strizlc.

The gallery also housed a bookshop that stocked a range of local and international books on photography and the latest specialist photographic periodicals and supplied Melbourne's schools, colleges and tertiary institutions. In 1981, in order to keep their gallery solvent Evans sold off her inventory of books and magazines; they became a foundation for 'The Printed Image' bookshop, which also specialised exclusively in photography.

The gallery space was also used to present visiting speakers and for photographic workshops, tutored by photographers and writers of the era including Pete Turner, editor of Creative Camera, UK; Jean-Marc Le Pechoux, publisher/editor of Light Vision; John Cato; and Ian Cosier.

Church Street also housed a photographic darkroom and framing facilities (which were used by artists and photographers, notably by German artist Herbert Zangs during his Australian visit in 1981).

In 1975, when Australian photography was developing a higher profile and becoming collectible, Horsham Regional Art Gallery Director Jean Davidson made the decision that the gallery would specialise in the medium, and during the following years she, and the subsequent director Merle Hathaway, consulted on purchases with the National Gallery of Victoria’s Jennie Boddington and with Evans, who was then running Church Street Gallery. One of the works she later acquired was Evans’ The Ascent (1993).

Over November and December 1981, Evans held a Final Retrospective of photographers who had shown in the gallery since 1977, then, despite the gallery being profiled in the European print letter, closed the Church Street premises in 1982, and relocated the gallery's collection and inventory to a private studio, from which she continued to operate. In 1978 she was appointed Approved Commonwealth Valuer for Australian and International photography from the 19th Century to the present day for the Australian Government's Cultural Gifts Program. Evans continued acting as a specialist adviser on photography for a number of public institutions and prominent private collectors in Australia and in 2003 funded a position at the University of Melbourne in which Daniel Palmer was appointed on 0.4 time as lecturer to initiate the institution's first subject focused on the history of photography.

== Photographer ==
After closing the Church Street Gallery, Evans enrolled at Photography Studies College in 1982, then devoted her time to photography, undertaking portraiture, documentary and landscape. In the latter genre her work includes an extended photo essay on roadside verges where she found wildlife road kills and fatalities. Completed between 1988 and 1996, Evans made the shots with a Widelux F7 35mm panoramic camera held in a vertical orientation and she often rotated the camera about the axis of its swiveling lens to produce distortion. The photo-book Only One Kilometre was made by Evans in the small Balcombe Estuary Reserve at Mt Martha on the Mornington Peninsula, the photographs presented with poetry and literary contributions from Graeme Kinross-Smith, Pat Raison and Chris Wallace-Crabbe. She also photographed in the Dandenong Ranges; along the Hume Hwy; in the Central Desert and outback Australia, most notably Oodnadatta, Oodlawirra, Menindee, and Lake Mungo; vineyards and rural villages in the South of France; and the old Jewish cemetery in the centre of Prague.

Evans's portrait photographs were taken mainly in black and white, at close range, and were usually environmental portraits that emphasised the psychological connexion between the sitter and his or her own space. They form a diverse cross-section of Australian society from anonymous sitters to intelligentsia and personalities, among them Marianne Baillieu; Barbara Blackman; Baron Avid von Blumenthal; Tim Burstall; Dur-e Dara; Robert Dessaix; Germaine Greer; Elena Kats-Chernin; Joan Kerr; Ellen Koshland; David Malouf; Dame Elisabeth Murdoch; Lin Onus; Jill Reichstein; and Chris Wallace-Crabbe.

Evans worked as an honorary photographer for the Department of Aboriginal Affairs in Central Australia and for over ten years documented Australian country towns and events for the National Library of Australia.

== Education and lecturing ==
Evans played an educational role in Australian photography. She taught history of photography at Melbourne's RMIT University; was appointed inaugural assistant director of Waverley City Gallery (now Monash Gallery of Art), 1990–1991, the first municipal public collection in Melbourne to specialise in photography; inaugurated a course on the History of Photography taught by Daniel Palmer and was appointed Research Fellow at the University of Melbourne (1997–2010). Evans continued conducting lectures and photographic workshops, predominantly in Melbourne and regional Victoria.

== Exhibitions ==
=== Solo exhibitions ===
- National Trust Gallery, Melbourne.
- 2010: Obscura Gallery, St Kilda East, Vic.

=== Group exhibitions ===
- 2011: Phiction: Lies, Illusion and the Phantasm in Australia Photography, Horsham Regional Art Gallery and touring eleven regional and metropolitan public galleries.
- Broken Hill Regional Art Gallery.
- 2015: Streetwise, Photonet Gallery, Fairfield, February 1–22
- 2019 In Her Words : A NETS Touring Exhibition curated by Olivia Poloni, Horsham Regional Art Gallery 2 March – 19 May; Wangaratta Art Gallery, 01 Nov – 15 Dec.

== Awards ==
- Print of the Year Award, IAPP Victorian Division (1985)
- Print of the Year Award, IAPP Victorian Division (1991)
- Medal of the Order of Australia (OAM) in the 2019 Queen's Birthday Honours for service to photography.

== Collections ==
Evans' work is held in the following permanent public collections:

- Musée de la Photographie, Mougins, France
- National Library of Australia
- National Gallery of Victoria
- State Library of Victoria
- State Library of New South Wales (Mitchell Library Collection)
- Jewish Museum of Australia
- Castlemaine Art Museum
- Horsham Regional Art Gallery
- Monash Gallery of Art
- Museum of Victoria, Melbourne
- Immigration Museum, Melbourne;

== Tapestry ==
In 1995, Evans' Selby Daffodils (Cotswald Farm), was made into a tapestry by the Australian Tapestry Workshop, Melbourne.

== Publications ==
- Kinross-Smith, Graeme, 1936-; Evans, Joyce (1987), Window to Australia : photographs, Deakin University, ISBN 978-0-7300-0498-1
- Evans, Joyce (2003), Only one kilometre, Lothian, ISBN 978-0-7344-0583-8
- Joyce Evans: Imaging the Spiritual 1980–2010, exhib. cat., Melbourne: Obscura Gallery, 2010
- Evans, Joyce; Dickerson Gallery (Melbourne, Vic.) (2007), Joyce Evans : my Australia, Dickerson Gallery
- Evans, Joyce; Harmsen, Andrew, (author.) (2019), We had such high hopes : student activism and the peace movement 1949-1952 : a photographic memoir, Australian Scholarly Publishing, ISBN 978-1-925801-85-9
- Syndikas, Alexander; Evans, Joyce (1983), Optical deformation, A. Syndikas]
