= Godwin Bradbeer =

New Zealand artist

- Born: 1950 (age 75–76); Dunedin, New Zealand
- Education: Melbourne Teachers College (now University of Melbourne); Melbourne College of Advanced Education (now University of Melbourne); RMIT University
- Known for: Drawing
- Awards: Dobell Drawing Prize (1998)
- Website: godwinbradbeer.com

Godwin Bradbeer (born 1950) is a New Zealand-born artist now living and working in Melbourne, Australia. Bradbeer is known for large-scale figurative drawing and has been exhibited internationally since the 1970s. He has taught at the University of Melbourne, the Victorian College of the Arts, Monash University, and other art schools in Australia and Asia. From 2005 to 2010, he was head of drawing of the School of Art at RMIT University in Melbourne.

== Biography ==
Bradbeer was born in 1950 in Dunedin, New Zealand. In the same year, his family moved to Glasgow, Scotland, then migrated to Australia in 1955. In 1971, Bradbeer received a Higher Diploma of Secondary Education (Art/Craft) at the Melbourne Teachers College (now part of the University of Melbourne) and taught in Victorian high schools from 1972 to 1982. He returned to study in 1983, completing a Bachelor of Education (Art/Craft) at the Melbourne College of Advanced Education (now also part of the University of Melbourne) in 1984. In 1986, he married Gabrielle Pervesi. From 1983 to 2010, he lectured in drawing and painting at various institutions, including the Victorian College of the Arts (University of Melbourne), Monash University, and RMIT University. In 1994, he completed a Master of Art at RMIT. Since 2010, Bradbeer has guest-lectured at various institutions.

The artist held his first solo exhibition in 1977 in Melbourne, and his first international exhibition took place in Hong Kong in 1999. He won the Dobell Drawing Prize in 1998 and was a finalist for the prize in 1999, 2000, 2002, 2003, 2004, 2005, 2006, 2007, 2008, 2011, and 2012. In 2014, he published a book of poetry, Half Truths: In Lyric Verse.

== Artistic style and subject ==
Between 1968 and 1980 Bradbeer collaborated with fellow artist Warren Breninger in a series of exhibitions in Melbourne, Sydney and Adelaide showing photographic work that was highly experimental, progressive and influential. The work presented a fusion of drawn and photographic processes into an imagery that possessed a sombre metaphysical character that was unique in Australian art at the time. In 1976 Bradbeer and Breninger's work together with work by Max Dupain, Rennie Ellis and John Cato (amongst others) was toured extensively in Asia and Africa in the Department of Foreign Affairs exhibition 'Recent Australian Photography'. The two photographers (Bradbeer and Breninger) twice exhibited at Brummels Gallery of Photography (1975 & 1976) with exhibitions that presented as a tour de force of contemporary art practice using photography with unprecedented experimental liberty.

Despite substantial experience as a photographer and as a painter, Bradbeer's most definitive practice is most frequently in various modes of drawing. His work is typified by large scale, moody images of the human subject, frequently indicating a refined rendering of human anatomy and an accompanying aspect of meditation on the human psycho-spiritual state. Bradbeer's figurative art draws upon the primitive, the classical and the contemporary aesthetics of many cultures and disciplines. Speaking on his practice, the artist states that "the drawings seek the credible portrayal of the miracle of existence over pictorial descriptions of character, narrative or ideology."

In 2006 – 2008 an extensive retrospective 'Godwin Bradbeer – The Metaphysical Body' toured seven regional galleries in several Australian states, this exhibition was curated by Kirsten Lacy. A major survey of his work titled; ‘Godwin Bradbeer: Stigma and Enigma’ and curated by James Lynch was presented at Deakin University in Melbourne in 2017. His large scale drawings of the human form have been described by one writer as 'drawing for the temple, not the cafe'.

Bradbeer's first solo exhibition was with Stuart Gerstman Gallery, Melbourne. In 1977, his first international solo exhibition was with Gerstman – Abdallah International in Cologne (then West Germany) in 1986. Most of Bradbeer's subsequent international exhibitions have been in Asia, primarily in South Korea.

In 2018 Bradbeer showed at La Capitale Galerie in Paris in the exhibition 'When Continents Collide #2' and in 2019 Bradbeer exhibited at that gallery again with artist/curator Nicol Rodriguez in an exhibition titled 'Jour et Nuit'. Selections from that exhibition were subsequently presented at Galerie Hoge Bomen in Veurne, Belgium.

== Awards, prizes and residencies ==
Amongst many other awards Bradbeer won Australia's premier award for drawing the Dobell Prize (from Art Gallery of N.S.W.) in 1998 and was a finalist for the prize in 1999, 2000, 2002, 2003, 2004, 2005, 2006, 2007, 2008, 2011 and 2012.

He was artist in residence at the National Gallery of Victoria in 1995 and again in 1998.

== Collections ==
Bradbeer's work is included within the collections of the Australian National Gallery, the National Gallery of Victoria, The Art Gallery of N.S.W., the Art Gallery of South Australia, Parliament House, Canberra, the Archive of Humanist Art, Commonwealth Art Bank, Lim lip Museum, Korea, Korean Art Institute, the University of Western Carolina, U.S.A. and other institutional collections nationally and internationally. His work is held in many private collections.
