= Peter Clancy =

Australian rules footballer

Personal information
- Full name: Peter Clancy
- Born: 31 January 1935 (age 91)
- Original team: Yarrawonga
- Height: 177 cm (5 ft 10 in)
- Weight: 73 kg (161 lb)

Playing career^{1}
Years	Club	Games (Goals)
1956–57	St Kilda	19 (18)
- ^{1} Playing statistics correct to the end of 1957.

Peter Clancy (born 31 January 1935) is a former Australian rules footballer who played with St Kilda in the Victorian Football League (VFL).
