= Rod McNicol =

Australian photographic artist (1946–2025)

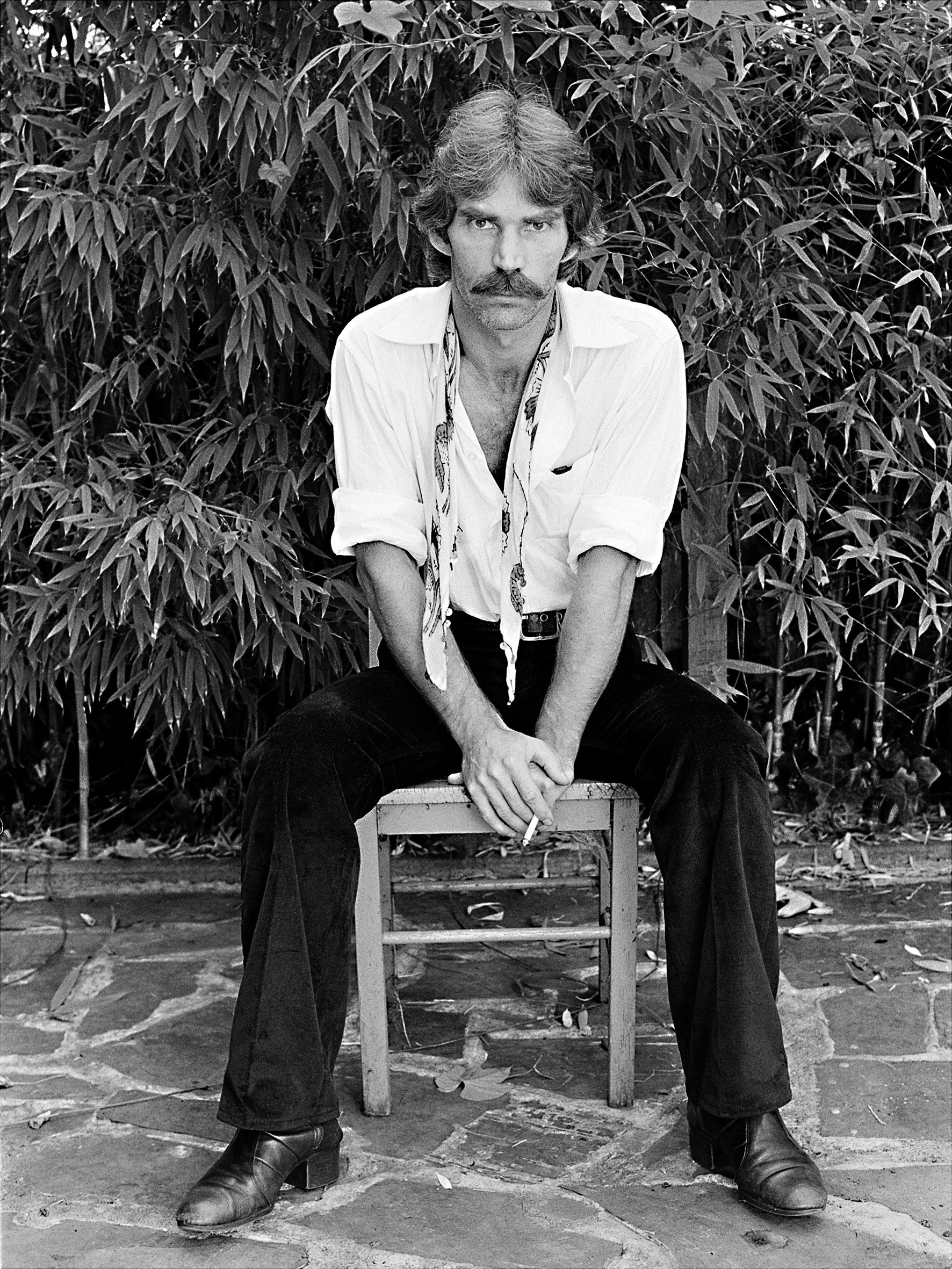
- Self-portrait, 1978

Background information
- Born: 1946; Melbourne, Victoria, Australia
- Died: 8 October 2025 (aged 79)

Rodney McNicol (1946 – 8 October 2025) was an Australian photographer.

== Life and career ==
In 1968 he left for Europe and spent the following four years travelling and working in Europe, North Africa, and the Middle East. He returned to Australia in 1973 and studied photography at Prahran College in 1974. In 1975 he co-founded The Photographers' Gallery and Workshop in South Yarra.

McNicol held his first exhibition (shared with Carol Jerrems) at Brummels Gallery in 1978. Later that year he moved into an old warehouse studio in Fitzroy. He lived and worked in the old daylit studio since then, refining and defining his fascination with photographic portraiture.

McNicol found his sitters from among those around him, his peers, his friends and other subjects from the rich inner-city life of his milieu. Echoing early 19th-century photographic portraiture by evoking a gentle stillness tempered by an unrelenting directness to the camera, he pared portraiture back to something of its bare essence.

McNicol studied photography at Prahran College 1970s and in 2007 he completed an Masters of Fine Art degree at Monash University.

In 2004, he won the Australian Photographic Portrait Prize at the Art Gallery of New South Wales, and in 2012 he won the National Photographic Portrait Prize, held at the National Portrait Gallery (Australia). He worked in major collections including the National Gallery of Victoria, the National Gallery of Australia, the National Portrait Gallery (Australia), the Art Gallery of New South Wales and the Bibliothèque nationale de France.

McNicol died on 8 October 2025, at the age of 79.

== Selected solo exhibitions ==
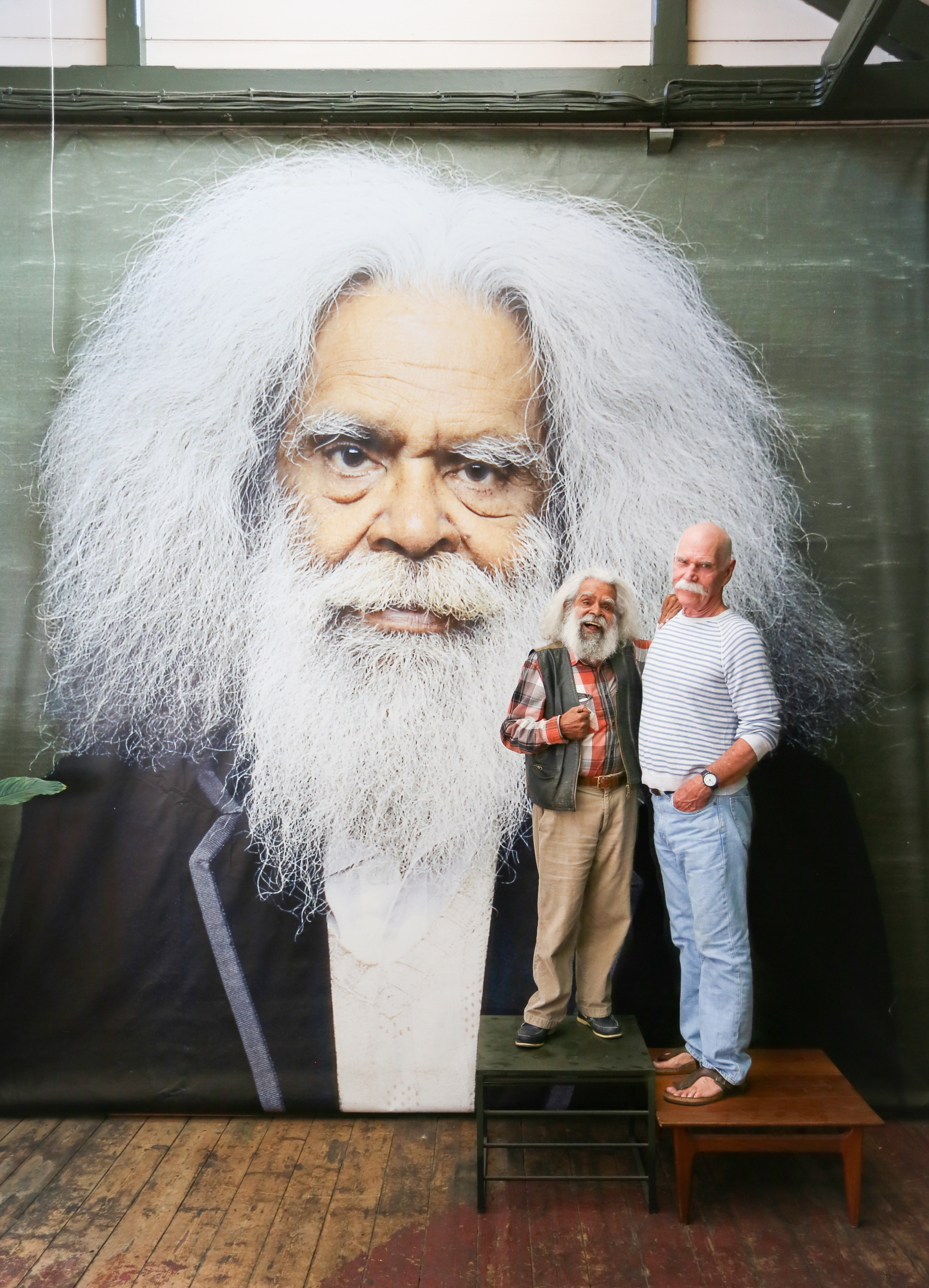
McNicol with Jack Charles and his portrait of Charles

- 2018 Portraits from my Village, Centre for Contemporary Photography, Melbourne, Victoria.
- 2016 Rod McNicol: Memento mori, Arts Space Wodonga, Victoria
- 2016 Rod McNicol: Memento mori, Yarra Ranges Art Museum, Victoria
- 2015 Life and time: Portraits by Rod McNicol, National Portrait Gallery (Australia), ACT
- 2015 Rod McNicol: Memento mori, Tweed River Art Gallery, NSW
- 2014 Rod McNicol: Memento mori; MAPh, Victoria
- 2009 Portraits from last century, Place Gallery, Melbourne
- 2008 Auto-portrait, Place Gallery, Melbourne
- 2005 Portraits from my village, Watson Place Gallery, Melbourne
- 1987 A Portrait, Studio 666, Paris, France
- 1986 A Portrait, Gallery Foto-Video, Cracow, Poland
- 1985 A Portrait, United Artists Gallery, Melbourne
- 1978 Permanent Mirrors, Brummels Gallery, Melbourne

== Collections ==
- "Art Gallery of NSW – Rod McNicol". Art Gallery of NSW.
- "Rod McNicol – National Gallery of Victoria". National Gallery of Victoria.
- "Rod McNicol – National Gallery of Australia". National Gallery of Australia.
- "Rod McNicol – National Portrait Gallery". National Portrait.
- National Library of Australia, Canberra
- Bibliothèque nationale de France, Paris, France
- City of Port Phillip, Melbourne
- City of Yarra, Melbourne
- Gold Coast City Art Gallery, Gold Coast, Queensland
- "MAPh – Rod McNicol". MAPh (Museum of Australian Photography).
- Tweed River Gallery, NSW
- Perc Tucker Regional Gallery, Townsville, Queensland

== Publications ==
- McNicol, Rod (2014) "The Existential Portrait", MGA
- McNicol, Rod (2022), Rod McNicol A Portrait, M.33, ISBN 978-0-6484899-7-9
- McNicol, Rod (2024) "BRUMMELS 1978", Light Of Day Books

== Video interviews ==
- "Portrait Story: Rod McNicol – Life and Times". National Portrait Gallery.
- "Portrait Story: Rod McNicol and Jack Charles". National Portrait Gallery.
- "Rod McNicol on Photographing Jack Charles". National Portrait Gallery.
- "Rod McNicol's Decades in Photographic Portraiture". ABC Arts. June 2023.
- "Rod McNicol Artist Talk: A Portrait Pilgrimage". Yarra City Arts. 10 July 2023.
- "Rod McNicol: A Portrait Revisited". Lens Culture.
- "Rod McNicol and his Portraits", 2024, a Light Of Day film by Yanni Florence
