= Brummels Gallery =

- Address: 95 Toorak Road
- Location: South Yarra, Victoria

Construction
- Opened: 8 October 1956

Brummels Gallery in South Yarra, Melbourne, Australia, was a commercial gallery established by David Yencken in 1956 to exhibit contemporary Modernist Australian painting, sculpture and prints, but after a period of dormancy became best known in the 1970s, under the directorship of Rennie Ellis, as the first in Australia to specialise in photography at a time when the medium was being revived as an art form. The gallery closed in 1980.

== Foundation of a gallery for Australian art ==
David Yencken (born 1931), Chairman and Joint managing director Merchant Builders Pty Ltd., and later to be University of Melbourne Elisabeth Murdoch Chair of Landscape Architecture and Environmental Planning 1988–1997, established Brummels on the top floor of 95 Toorak Rd., South Yarra, above Brummels espresso bar, whose proprietor, Pat Collins, joined in the venture. It was the second gallery in Melbourne to exclusively show Australian art. (the first was Australian Galleries in Collingwood, which opened 5 months earlier).

The gallery was opened on Monday 8 October 1956 at 5.50 pm by Sir Daryl Lindsay then about to retire as Director of the NGV and who was easing its resistance to Modernism. The show presented artists from both Sydney and Melbourne and included Jewish migrants Sali Herman, whose Two Soldiers Sleeping on a Train was bought by a Melbourne family, and Judy Cassab (a future Archibald Prize winner); alongside George Bell; Elaine Haxton, who showed works made on a visit to Communist China with an Australian cultural delegation; with a landscape by Charles Bush, and a wood carving by sculptor Clifford Last.

Brummels Gallery continued to promote significant Australian artists, many of whom had sought refuge in the country after World War II, including a one-man exhibition by Sali Herman; abstract paintings, drawings and sketches for ceramic murals by John Howley, Donald Laycock and Lawrence Daws with pottery by Tom Sanders (10–15 December 1956) opened by architect Peter McIntyre; Anita Aarons, Ola Cohn, Vincas Jolantas, Inge King, Julius Kane, Clifford Last, Clement Meadmore, Andor Meszaros, Lenton Parr, Günther Stein, Tina Wentcher, Teisutis Zikaras in Twelve Melbourne Sculptors (1957), opened by Neil Clerehan (who himself held a sculpture show there that year, as did Vincas Jolantas); watercolours by Guy Grey-Smith (also 1957), drawings by Teisutis Zikaras, a group show of Eric Thake, James Meldrum, Douglas Annand, Charles Bush, and Kenneth Hood (all 1957); silversmithing and jewellery by Matcham Skipper (1958); drawings by Jon Molvig (mid-1958), sketches, costumes, and designs for the Australian Elizabethan Theatre Trust by Barry Kay, 20 April – 2 May 1959; Antonio Rodrigues wooden sculpture (1959). Exhibitions were held by Desiderius Orban, John Brack, Clifton Pugh, Dorothy Baker and others.

This first manifestation of Brummels closed briefly after a fire, and after Pat Collins moved to Hobart to open Tasmania's first liquor-licensed restaurant, the gallery reopened in October 1962 with a posthumous show of graphic works by Latvian Janis Riekstins. Thereafter, occasional exhibitions in the space were held, and as late as 1968 Ojars Biseniek's abstractions shown there were reviewed (dismissively) by Patrick McCaughey in The Age 13 March 1968

== Australia's first gallery of photography 1972–1980 ==
In the early 1970s, advertising photographer and photojournalist Rennie Ellis with deputy director Robert Ashton reopened the space as Brummels Gallery of Photography. Assisted with two Arts Council grants, it was non-profit, and the first privately run art gallery in the country to be devoted specifically to photography. It was particularly a showcase and outlet for Australian photographers though it also attracted shows from international photographic artists Charles Gatewood (Sidetripping 1975) and Sarah Moon.

On 14 December 1972, the gallery opened with Two Views of Erotica: Henry Talbot/Carol Jerrems (14 December 1972 – 21 January 1973), launched by photographer and filmmaker, Paul Cox, who was soon to open The Photographers Gallery around the corner in Punt Rd South Yarra. This period brought a reawakening to the photographic medium as an art form not seen since the Pictorialist era, and saw the National Gallery of Victoria open the first photography department in a government-run institution, under the curatorship of Jennie Boddington. From 1977, the gallery was sponsored by the camera manufacturer Pentax and was renamed Pentax Brummels Gallery of Photography. In 2015 the terrace shopfront still bore this signage in faded letters across its upper facade.

The gallery closed in January 1980, the month before the premature death of its inaugural exhibitor, Carol Jerrems. Having run for eight years, the gallery had advanced the standing of photography as art and the careers of many Australian photographers including Warren Breninger, Godwin Bradbeer, Ponch Hawkes, David Moore, Gerard Groeneveld, Peter Leiss, Steven Lojewski, Rod McNicol, Wesley Stacey, Robert Ashton, Ian Dodd, Sue Ford, George Gittoes, Ashe Venn, John Williams, Jon Rhodes, Geoff Strong, Jean-Marc Le Pechoux and Henry Talbot.

== Selected exhibitions 1972–1980 ==
Around seventy photography exhibitions were shown during this period, including:

- 1972,14 December–21 January; Two Views of Erotica: Henry Talbot and Carol Jerrems
- 1972 Group Exhibition Friends (incl. Wesley Stacey)
- 1973 Group Exhibition Children (incl. Rennie Ellis)
- 1973, August; Graham McCarter and Anthony Browell
- 1973 Robert Ashton Faces and Places
- 1973 Wesley Stacey Towards a Self-Portrait
- 1973/4 Shane McCarthy solo
- 1974 Peter Leiss Urban Labyrinth
- 1974 December; joint show by Carol Jerrems showing 32 images from her A Book About Australian Women,' and Robert Ashton exhibiting images from his book Into the Hollow Mountains: A Portrait of Fitzroy
- 1974 Sue Ford Time Series (exhibited the same year at NGV)
- 1974, July; Matthew NIckson, Euan McGillivray, Jacqueline Mitelman
- 1975 Warren Breninger, Godwin Bradbeer Mortal Trash is Immortal Diamond
- 1975, September; John Williams
- 1975 George Gittoes Rainbow Way (also shown Coventry Gallery, Sydney)
- 1976 Robert Ashton Between Light and Dark
- 1976 Ponch Hawkes: Our Mums and Us
- 1976 Jon Lewis solo
- 1976, June; Jutta Hosel and Irvin Rockman joint show
- 1976, November; David Moore Retrospective 1940–76
- 1976 Warren Breninger, Godwin Bradbeer, J. Bradbeer Eyelid to Eyelid
- February 1977 Phillip Adams opens Sarah Moon exhibition, announces the renaming of the gallery to the Pentax Brummels Photography Gallery
- 1977 Jane England solo
- 1978 February 4–March 4; Geoff Strong
- 1978 Group Exhibition Down Under, Down Under Show (incl. Geoff Parr, Marion Hardman)
- 1978, 3 August to 3 September: Rod McNicol and Carol Jerrems joint exhibition
- 1978 Charles Gatewood Sidetripping
- 1978, April; Steven Lojewski, 'Recent Photographs'
- 1978, April/May; Gerard Groeneveld
- 1978, 17 May – 17 June: Peter Leiss, The Enneagram Series
- 1978, November; Peter Turner
- 1979, January; Jon Rhodes, Stella Salman
- 1979, March; Bruce Haswell Realisme
- 1980, January; Emma Shmith, Photographic Allsorts

== Legacy ==
In 2012, the importance of Brummels to photography in Australia was recognised in the Monash Gallery of Art retrospective exhibition Brummels: Australia's First Gallery of Photography 22 October 2011 – 22 January 2012, which was attended by 15,639 visitors. Research done by the Australian Centre for Photography shows that Brummels was established fifth in order of photographic centres worldwide.
