= Henry Talbot (photographer) =

German-Australian fashion photographer

Henry Talbot, born Heinz Tichauer (6 December 1920, Germany – 25 January 1999) was a German-Australian fashion photographer noted for his long association with the Australian fashion industry, particularly the Australian Wool Board.

== Life and career ==
Born in Germany to Jewish parents, he studied graphic design at the Reimann School in Berlin. Henry first travelled to London, England under pressure from rising tensions. There he worked as a window-dresser at a department store. After the Kristallnacht, Henry's father Max was detained, but having won the Iron Cross in World War I, Max was released, and subsequently Max and his wife fled to Bolivia.

In England, Henry was interned as a German National by two plain clothes policemen and later shipped to Australia on the Dunera. During his internment in Hay, New South Wales, Henry practiced his artwork and studied in the camp 'university' established by the internees.

Upon release in 1942, Henry joined the Australian Army, in which he served until 1946, loading and unloading goods trains at the New South Wales / Queensland border, where he established a close personal friendship with fellow German refugee Helmut Newton. After the War, Henry refreshed his studies of graphic design at the Royal Melbourne Institute of Technology. Henry then visited his parents in Cochabamba, Bolivia, practicing art and reviving his pre-war interest in photography, winning a local photography prize.

== Professional photographer ==
Returning to Australia in 1950 Talbot worked as a photographer, setting up a Melbourne studio in 1956 with Helmut Newton a fellow refugee whom he had met while fruit picking in Tocumwal after his release from internment. The studio specialised in fashion and advertising. During this time, Helmut declared to Henry that he was "going to move to Europe and become the greatest photographer in the world", and asked Henry if he would look after the studio in his absence. Henry agreed. Helmut left Australia permanently in May 1961, opting out of the informal partnership with Talbot (paid out with ‘two thousand dollars and two cameras’), and established himself in Europe while Henry took over the business, of a company named Helmut Newton & Henry Talbot Pty Ltd which was formally registered as a company 28 June 1963 and operated at Bourke Street until April 1966, when it moved to La Trobe Street, operating until 1976.

Talbot photographed various Australian Olympic figures, including gold medallist Dawn Fraser in the Olympic pool in Melbourne during the 1956 Summer Olympics and Franz Stampfl, whom he knew through the Hay internment and who trained Roger Bannister for his four-minute mile record. Other famous Australian models included Penny Pardey and Judy O'Connell, house models for Pierre Cardin, in 1967. During this period he was commissioned by the Australian Wool Board, Vogue, Vanity Fair, Kent Cigarettes and General Motors, among other brands. He also portrayed significant leading Australian professionals including art historian Gael Newton.

== Teaching, exhibiting ==
Henry became Head of the Photography Department at the School of Art and Design at Preston (later Phillip) Institute of Technology, Melbourne (1973–1985), employing and teaching with younger photographers Mark Strizic and with Carol Jerrems, who also modelled for him. In 1972, Talbot jointly showed these images of Jerrems, including some nude portraits and figure studies, alongside the work of 23-year-old Jerrems', in Two Views of Erotica – Carol Jerrems & Henry Talbot, which was the inaugural exhibition of Rennie Ellis' Toorak gallery Brummels (Australia’s first dedicated photography gallery). The show was opened by photographer/filmmaker Paul Cox. Ellis, a notorious provocateur, selected Talbot and Jerrems to attract attention to the new gallery.

== Later life ==
Talbot moved to Sydney with artist and mathematician Lynette Mortimer, whom he had married in 1974, and sons (Neale and John-Paul), in 1985.

His later projects included studies of the nude, portraits of prominent Australian Jews and also modernist architect Harry Seidler and revisiting the sites of the Holtermann photographs taken at and around the historic township of Hill End, located in the gold fields district of New South Wales.

Henry Talbot died in 1999 of cancer, shortly after revisiting the places of his youth in Europe.

== Recognition ==
Shortly after his death, the Australian Institute of Professional Photography (AIPP) instituted the Henry Talbot Award for Services to the Photographic Industry.

== Awards ==
- 1958 Fashion Photographer of the Year, Australian Fashion News
- 1963 C.S. Christian Trophy, Australian Photographic Society
- 1965 A.P.R. Achievement in Photography Award
- 1967 Award of Distinction, Pacific Photographic Fair
- 1968 Distinctive Merit Award, Art Directors Club of Melbourne
- Awarded E (Excellence) by Honours Committee of Federation internationale de l'Art Photographique.
