= Robert Ashton (photographer) =

Australian photographer and photojournalist

- Born: August 11, 1950 (age 76); Melbourne
- Education: Prahran College
- Occupation: Photographer
- Website: robertashton.com.au

Robert Ashton (1950) is an Australian photographer and photojournalist.

== Early life and education ==
Robert Ashton was born on August 11, 1950, in Melbourne. He studied Photography at Prahran College 1969-71 and graduated with a Diploma of Visual Arts and Design.

== Career ==
In the early 1970s, Robert Ashton shared house with Carol Jerrems and Ian Macrae in Mozart Street, St Kilda, their artist associates being Ingeborg Tyssen, Paul Cox and Bill Heimerman, and Ashton's cousin Rennie Ellis with whom he shared a studio in Greville Street, Prahran. From 1974 to 1981, Ashton was assistant director at Ellis's Brummels Gallery in Toorak Road, South Yarra, where he also exhibited.

Photography curator Judy Annear notes that;

"Robert Ashton's work is typical of the highly personalised documentary photographs that began to emerge in the 1970s."

His subject matter includes urban indigenous, life and incidents in inner suburbia in Melbourne, particularly Fitzroy. Writer and musician Mark Gillespie, who had become involved in a new publishing venture, Outback Press, with Fred Milgrom Colin Talbot and Morry Schwartz, commissioned Ashton for the book Into the Hollow Mountains, with texts by Tony Birch, Lorin Clarke, Damian Sharp and Helen Garner. Its images, of "kids on the prowl, the old Salvo street bands, the Koorie clans, the card joint kaphenois", were first shown at Brummels in an exhibition of that title in 1974, and when re-exhibited forty years later at Colour Factory, "serve as a rare documentation of day-to-day Melbourne and glimpse into an era that, while not actually all that distant, is most definitely a thing of the past." The Hollow Mountain series was reissued in a new volume Fitzroy 1974.

Ashton has published several other books, of portraits and close-up, abstracted landscape, and exhibited widely in Australia. His photograph Bernard Diving featured in the 1988 exhibition, and on the cover its catalogue, The Thousand Mile Stare, a survey of Australian photography published by the Victorian Centre for Photography.

To ensure high-quality output for his imagery, Ashton adopted, and currently uses, hand-built oversize large-format view cameras and advanced printing techniques including photogravure and the Collodion process.

Ashton currently resides in Victoria's Surf Coast, and imagery of the ocean and landscape is a consistent interest.

== Exhibitions ==
=== Solo ===
- 1973 Faces and Places, Brummels Gallery, Melbourne
- 1974 Into the Hollow Mountains: A Portrait of Fitzroy, Brummels Gallery
- 1976 Between Light and Dark, Australian Centre for Photography, Sydney
- 1976 Between Light and Dark, Brummels Gallery, Melbourne
- 1979 Adventures in Paradise? Church Street Photographic Centre, Melbourne
- 1987 Adventures in Paradise?, Australian Centre for Photography, Sydney.
- 1987 Photogravure Images, United Artists Gallery, Melbourne.
- 1990 What are you Doing? What are you Saying?, Luba Bilu Gallery, Melbourne
- 2000 Hidden Things, Qdos Gallery, Lorne
- 2001 Life Sanctuary, Patricia Autore Gallery, Melbourne
- 2003 Different Dreams-Same Reality, Patricia Autore Gallery, Melbourne
- 2005 Evidence, Little Malop Gallery, Geelong
- 2006 Visual Instinct, Libby Edwards Gallery - Melbourne
- 2007 Recognition, Pigment Gallery, Prague
- 2009 Snapshots from the edge, Qdos Gallery, Lorne
- 2009 Photographs from the edge, Monash Gallery of Art
- 2012 Postmortem, Edmund Pearce Gallery, Melbourne
- 2013 Interior/Exterior, Edmund Pearce Gallery, Melbourne
- 2014 Into The Hollow Mountains, Colour Factory Gallery, Melbourne
- 2014 Interior/Exterior + Postmortem gravures, Black Eye Gallery, Sydney
- 2015 Thin Air, Qdos Gallery, Lorne
- 2015, 6 Aug - 29 Aug; Thin Air, Colour Factory Gallery, 409-429 Gore St, Fitzroy
- 2021, 3–25 Apr, Bush Theatre, Qdos Gallery, Lorne

=== Group ===
- 1982 Ray Hughes Gallery, Brisbane.
- 1988 The Thousand Mile Stare, Victorian Centre for Photography
- 1988 Artery Gallery, Geelong.
- 1990 Qdos Gallery, Lorne. 1990
- 1991 Special . . . It's Been Used Before, Luba Bilu Gallery.
- 1991 Survey - A Regional Review, Geelong Art Gallery.
- 1998 Waterproof, Centro Cultural de Belem, Lisbon Portugal.
- 2003 Australian Photographic Portrait Prize, Art Gallery of NSW.
- 2007 Ulrich and Schubert Photography award, Gold Coast City Art Gallery
- 2007 Bowness Photography prize, Monash Gallery of Art.
- 2010 Bowness Photography prize 2010, Monash Gallery of Art.
- 2011 Ulrich and Schubert Photography award, Gold Coast City Art Gallery.
- 2020, 31 October 2020 – 7 February 2021 Bowness Photography prize 2020, Monash Gallery of Art.

== Collections ==
- Hallmark Cards Collection, National Gallery of Australia
- National Gallery of Victoria
- Phillip Morris Collection, Australian National Gallery
- Art Gallery of New South Wales
- Tasmanian Museum and Art Gallery
- John Sands Collection
- Charles Darwin University

== Publications ==
- Ashton, Robert (1974). Into the hollow mountains. Fitzroy, Vic.: Outback Press. ISBN 978-0-86888-006-8.
- Park, Andy; Smolan, Rick (1981), A day in the life of Australia, A Day in the life of Australia Pty Ltd, ISBN 978-0-9594244-0-9
- Smolan, Rick; Park, Andy; O'Loughlin, Peter (1983), A day in the life of Victoria, DITLA, ISBN 978-0-9594244-3-0
- Bennett, David; Agee, Joyce; Victorian Centre for Photography (1988), The thousand mile stare : a photographic exhibition, The Victorian Centre for Photography Inc, ISBN 978-0-7316-2054-8
- Crombie, Isobel; Byron, Sandra; National Gallery of Victoria (1990), Twenty contemporary Australian photographers : from the Hallmark Cards Australian Photographic Collection, National Gallery of Victoria, ISBN 978-0-7241-0142-9
- Ashton, Robert; Day, Gregory (2003), Trace, Merrijig Word & Sound Co, ISBN 978-1-74066-109-6
- Blackmore, Paul; Malouf, David, 1934-; Juan Davila collection (1999), Australians : responses to the land, St Martin Press, ISBN 978-0-646-37815-2
- Calado, Jorge; Centro Cultural de Belém (Lisbon, Portugal); 100 Days Festival ((1998 : Lisbon, Portugal)) (1998), Waterproof : water in photography since 1852 ([Hardcover ed.] ed.), Edition Stemmle, ISBN 978-3-908161-26-4
- Crombie, Isobel; Blainey, Geoffrey, 1930-; National Gallery of Victoria (1992), Sites of the imagination : contemporary photographers view Melbourne and its people (English language ed.), National Gallery of Victoria, ISBN 978-0-7241-0161-0
- Ashton, Robert; Day, Gregory; Birch, Tony; Sharp, Damian; Garner, Helen; Clarke, Lorin (2024). Day, Gregory (ed.). Fitzroy 1974. Melbourne: Hardie Grant Books. ISBN 978-1-74379-941-3. OCLC 1430654784.
