= Gerrit Fokkema =

Australian photographer

- Born: 1954 (age 71–72); Port Moresby
- Occupation: Photographer

Gerrit Fokkema Born in Port Moresby, Papua New Guinea in 1954 and moved to Australia in 1958.

== Education ==
Gerrit Fokkema attended the NSW public system primary and secondary schools in Queanbeyan, NSW. graduating with a Higher School Certificate in 1972.

Fokkema's formal photographic education was at Canberra Technical College, Canberra, ACT from 1974 to 1977, Photography Certificate.

== Career ==
Fokkema worked as a news photographer from 1975 to 1984.

He began as a cadet photographer with The Canberra Times, and worked there for four years, 1975 to 1979.

He then moved to Sydney and worked at The Sydney Morning Herald for four years, from 1980 to 1984.

For the next three years Fokkema worked at The Good Weekend Magazine, a colour magazine supplement to the Saturday edition of The Sydney Morning Herald.

He was self employed from 1987 to 2018, working in association with design and architectural firms, producing images used in corporate marketing, communications and Annual Reports for some of Australia's largest companies.

== Photography ==
Gerrit's living was made producing images for first newspapers, (The Canberra Times, The Sydney Morning Herald)and later for corporate and commercial clients.

The short term focus of daily news production frustrated Fokkema's inclination to engage more deeply in subjects, so on weekends and holidays he pursued his own personal projects.

That combination of commercial work and a need for self expression meant that Gerrit could fund his personal projects through commercial activities and maintain independence.

"Recognised in the late seventies as one of the new generation, Gerrit Fokkema extended the documentary genre of photographers such as Dupain, Moore, Quirk, Scott and Tweedie.

He pictured Canberra, then Sydney, and later regional areas such as Wilcannia, with wry humour, irony and an empathy for both built and natural environments and the characters and animals which inhabited the spaces.

Fokkema's high degree of technical skill and sophisticated rendering of light resulted in sumptuous, silvery prints with strong formal and aesthetic qualities"

- Christine Godden, Director of Australian Centre for Photography 1978 to 1983

- from "Signature Works" catalogue published in 1999 to celebrate 25 years since the start of The Australian Centre for Photography

== Exhibitions ==
=== Individual exhibitions ===
• 2018 Wilcannia Photographs 1983 to 2016 - River Meeting Gallery, Queens Head, Wilcannia

• 2000 Otherdaze - Byron Mapp Gallery, Sydney

• 1995 Family - Byron Mapp Gallery, Sydney

• 1983 Somedaze II - Images Gallery, Sydney

• 1979 Gerrit Fokkema - The Australian Centre for Photography, Sydney

• 1978 Somedaze I - Susan Gillespie Galleries, Canberra

=== Group exhibitions ===
• 2024 Wilder Times | Arthur Boyd and the mid-1980s landscape, Bundanon Art Museum, Illaroo NSW.

• 2021 Finalist and Highly Commended in The Olive Cotton Award for Photographic Portraiture, Tweed Regional Gallery.

• 2020 Paper Tigers : Australian Photojournalists. - HeadOn Photo Festival, Sydney.

• 2019 Untitled & Unfinished - HeadOn Photo Festival, Sydney.

• 2017 Wilcannia Stories HeadOn Photo Festival, Sydney.

• 2016 Demolished Sydney - Museum of Sydney.

• 2015 Finalist - Bowness Photography prize MGA, Victoria.

• 2014 The Road : photographer on the move 1970 - 1985 - MGA, Victoria.

• 2014 Australian Vernacular Photography - Art Gallery of NSW, Sydney.

• 2008 Finalist, Josephine Ulrick and Win Shubert Photography Award, Gold Coast, Queensland.

• 2007 Sydney Now : New Australian Photojournalism, Museum of Sydney.

• 2007 Finalist, Josephine Ulrick and Win Shubert Photography Award, Gold Coast, Queensland.

• 2006 In Transit - Alliance Franciase, Sydney.

• 2006 Finalist Josephine Ulrick & Win Shubert Photography Award, Gold Coast, Queensland.

• 2005 Wastelands - A Poetic Legacy The Art Gallery of NSW, Sydney.

• 2005 Eye 4 Photography - The State Library of NSW, Sydney.

• 2004 Australian Postwar Photodocumentary - The Art Gallery of NSW, Sydney

• 2002 Re Presenting The Real - Documentary Photography 2002 - Stills Gallery, Sydney.

• 2002 The Home Front - Canberra Contemporary Art Space.

• 2002 Reporting The World - John Pilger's Great Eyewitness Photographers - The Museum of Contemporary Art, Sydney.

• 2001 Belonging : A century Celebrated - The State Library of NSW, Sydney

• 2000 My City of Sydney - Art gallery of NSW, Sydney.

• 1999 4th Birthday Exhibition - Byron Mapp Gallery, Sydney.

• 1999 Signature Works, 25th Anniversary Exhibition - The Australian Centre for Photography, Sydney.

• 1999 Living In The Seventies - Canberra Museum and Gallery.

• 1999 Site : The Parliament House Construction Photography Project - Parliament House, Canberra.

• 1997 Econtros da Imagem - Braga, Portrugal.

• 1994 Sydney Photographed - Museum of Contemporary Art, Sydney.

• 1988 Shades of Light - Photography and Australia 1839 to 1988 - The Australian National Gallery, Canberra.

• 1987 Living in the 70's : Australian photographs - The Australian National Gallery, Canberra.

• 1976 10 Viewpoints - Australian Centre for Photography, Sydney.

• 1975 18th Sydney International Exhibition of Photography, Sydney Town Hall.
