= Carol Jerrems =

Australian photographer (1949–1980)

- Jerrems photographed by Rennie Ellis at Brummels Gallery in 1975
- Born: 14 March 1949; Ivanhoe, Victoria
- Died: 21 February 1980 (aged 30); Prahran, Victoria
- Known for: Photography

Carol Joyce Jerrems (14 March 1949 – 21 February 1980) was an Australian photographer/filmmaker whose work emerged just as her medium was beginning to regain the acceptance as an art form that it had in the Pictorial era, and in which she newly synthesizes complicity performed, documentary and autobiographical image-making of the human subject, as exemplified in her Vale Street.

Known for documenting the revolutionary spirit of sub-cultures including that of indigenous Australians, disaffected youth, and the emergent feminist movement of Melbourne in the 1970s, her work has been compared to that of internationally known Americans Larry Clark–of a slightly older generation–and Nan Goldin, as well as fellow Australian William Yang.

Jerrems died at age 30. Her short yet productive seven-year career parallels that of contemporary Francesca Woodman.

From 30 November 2024 to 2 March 2025, the National Portrait Gallery, Canberra has an exhibition of Jerrems' portraits.

== Early life ==
Jerrems was born on 14 March 1949 at Ivanhoe, Melbourne the third child of Victorian-born parents Eric Alfred Jerrems (1917–1970), an accountant with Edward Trenchard and Co., Stock and Station Agents in Collins Street, Melbourne, and Joyce Mary (a.k.a. Joy) née Jacobs, (1922–1993), commercial seamstress and hobby watercolorist. Jerrems attended (1955–60) Ivanhoe Primary School and Heidelberg High School (1961–66) and went on to complete a Diploma of Art and Design, majoring in photography (1967–70), in the newly established photography course at Prahran Technical School, where she was taught by cinematographer Paul Cox and acted in his film Skin Deep. During her studies she was awarded the Walter Lindrum Scholarship, the Institute of Australian Photographers Award, and first prize in the Kodak Students Photographic Competition.

Having graduated from Prahran Technical School, Jerrems undertook a Diploma of Education at Hawthorn State College, Melbourne.

== Career ==
In 1971, National Gallery of Victoria curator Jennie Boddington (from 1972 director of the first Department of Photography in any Australian public gallery) acquired Jerrems' work for the collection.

She remained close to Paul Cox, appearing in his The Journey (1972), and to fellow Prahran College ex-students Ian Macrae and Robert Ashton, with whom she shared 11 Mozart Street, St. Kilda. She appears in Ian Macrae's experimental stop-frame short Fly Wrinklys Fly which he made for Channel 9.

When, in 1973, Jerrems started teaching at Heidelberg Technical School, she befriended its disadvantaged students who lived in the 1956 Olympic Village housing commission flats, some of whom were members of sharpie gangs. She photographed and filmed them in nearby Banyule Reserve at Viewbank on the Yarra River. Series of these images were published in the Melbourne University quarterly Circus amongst the increasing number of commissions and publications she secured through her widening networks in cinema, theatre, music, women's liberationist and aboriginal communities.

Jerrems also made a friend of 62-year-old Henry Talbot (who was then exchanging a career in fashion photography for teaching), and posed for him. They formed a collaboration so successful that when Australia's first stand-alone photography gallery Brummels was opened by Rennie Ellis and Robert Ashton above a cafe at 95 Toorak Road, South Yarra, the inaugural exhibition was Two Views of Erotica: Henry Talbot/Carol Jerrems (14 December 1972 – 21 January 1973). Talbot invited her to teach photography with him at the Preston Institute and in 1975 she also began teaching photography, filmmaking and yoga at Coburg Technical School, Melbourne.

These successes brought her, in 1974, an exhibition of her 1968 College assignment The Alphabet Folio at the National Gallery of Victoria, and inclusion in a survey of contemporary Australian photography published by the newly formed Australian Centre for Photography (ACP), Sydney. She published A Book About Australian Women prompted by the upcoming International Women's Year (IWY) of 1975, also exhibiting 32 works-in-progress from this series at Brummels (1974).

== Sydney ==
In 1975, Jerrems moved to Sydney to live with her boyfriend, filmmaker Esben Storm. She taught at Hornsby and Meadowbank Technical Colleges.

In Sydney, Jerrems exhibited solo and conducted workshops at the ACP. She later showed at Hogarth Galleries, then with Christine Godden, Christine Cornish and Jenny Aitken in Four Australian Women, at the Photographers' Gallery in South Yarra, Melbourne (18 May – 11 June 1978), and with Roderick McNicol at Pentax Brummels Gallery of Photography (3 August – 3 September 1978). Another solo exhibition at the ACP followed in November that included photographs from her series Thirty—eight Buick (1976) and Sharpies (1976). Meanwhile, Jerrems completed her film Hanging About (1978), about rape:

Rape is the hatred, contempt and oppression of women in this society, in one act. It is a symptom of a mass sickness called sexism. This sickness can be cured. In order to change, we have to change. (from closing title)

The actors included Kate Grenville and Esben Storm, who shared a house with Jerrems at 19 Second Avenue, Willoughby, and was shot on 16 mm film by fellow tenant, Michael Edols. The film was (posthumously) a finalist in the general section of the Greater Union Awards and shown on 13 June 1980, at the opening of the Sydney Film Festival at the State Theatre, Sydney. Critic Robert Neri wrote; "Hangin Out [sic] is well shot in black and white, about a female stripper, and composed of fast and slow, theatrical and verité-like shots."

== Tasmania and terminal illness ==
In 1979 Jerrems began teaching at the School of Art in the Tasmanian College of Advanced Education, Hobart, but was admitted to hospital on 12 June suffering Budd–Chiari syndrome. Despite the painful condition, she worked on a photo-diary of her prolonged stay in Royal Hobart Hospital then traveled to Sydney that August to contribute to the Visual Arts Board photography assessment panel for the Australia Council with Bill Heimerman. However, on 19 November 1979 she was admitted again to hospital in Melbourne. She died 21 February 1980 at The Alfred Hospital.

== Technique ==
Jerrems, Vale Street 1975

Jerrems photographed in a subjective manner, responding interactively with her subject and their environment. As Magdalene Keaney notes, "By gazing directly into the lens, hamming it up for the camera, or striking a pose, the subjects of Jerrems' portraits of the mid-70s reveal the collaborative nature of her working method." Kathy Drayton, director of Girl in a Mirror, supports this notion of collaboration; "In the act of photographing, Jerrems challenged herself and her models to extend themselves in a mutual game of improvisation and exploration, facilitated by the presence of her camera. This created an intimate frisson between herself and her subjects which is clearly registered in the most powerful of her portraits."

Proof sheets for Vale Street reveal a day-long shooting session that is a change from the apparently more spontaneous preceding work for A Book About Australian Women. There is a change of location (from Mozart Street to Vale Street, St. Kilda) before the male sharpie youths Mark Lean and Jon Bourke, and Jerrems' female model Catriona Brown, whom they had not met before, relaxed enough to remove their shirts for the selected image. The image has been identified as marking a shift from documentary realism to more subjective postmodern style of photography

She always used a 35mm Pentax Spotmatic single-lens reflex camera with a standard f1.4 50mm lens, eschewing wide or telephoto lenses, and used black and white film, usually Kodak Tri-X, which she processed and printed herself in a series of home and college darkrooms, and colour only rarely.

She used available light, without flash; responding in 1978 to Philip Quirk's unpublished interview question for Rolling Stone, "If you could be in any one situation anywhere, at any time with anyone and any camera, what would it be?" Jerrems answered "With people or one person, natural light, morning or late afternoon, and a 35mm SLR."

In an interview with Natalie king, Robert Ashton, himself a fastidious technician, recalled that Jerrems "...always had her camera with her. She was very meticulous technically so even her proof sheets were a work of art..."

Her unpublished note, "Teaching Philosophy" lists four elements that Jerrems identified as crucial to photography: "1.Subject Matter; 2.Composition; 3.Lighting; 4.The Decisive Moment."

== Recognition ==
Carol Jerrems' life and work has achieved wide recognition through exhibitions and screenings of her films; the touring 1990 Australian National Gallery posthumous retrospective, Living in the 70s: Photographs by Carol Jerrems, curated by Helen Ennis and Bob Jenyns; the documentary Girl in a Mirror (2005); and the Heide exhibition and accompanying book Up Close comparing her to autobiographical documentarians, the Americans Larry Clark and Nan Goldin, and Australian William Yang.

Jerrems photographs and negatives are archived at the National Gallery of Australia.

Jerrems' work is highlighted in She Persists: Perspectives on Women in Art & Design published by the National Gallery of Victoria.

== Awards ==
- 1968 Walter Lindrum Scholarship
- 1970 Institute of Australian Photographers Award
- 1971 Kodak student photographic competition
- 1975 Creative Development Branch, Australian Film Commission, Experimental Film Grant
- 1975 Travel Grant, by the Visual Arts Board, Australia Council

== Exhibitions ==
=== Solo ===
- 1974, November; Alphabet Folio, National Gallery of Victoria, Melbourne.
- 1974, December; images from A Book About Australian Women, Brummels Gallery of Photography (alongside Robert Ashton's Into the Hollow Mountains)
- 1976 concurrent showing with Melanie le Guay, Australian Centre for Photography, .
- 1978, November–December; Australian Centre for Photography, Sydney

=== Group ===
- 1972/3, December–January; Two Views of Erotica: Henry Talbot/Carol Jerrems, Brummels Gallery
- 1973 joint exhibition with Lorraine Jenyns (ceramic sculpture) at Chapman Powell Street Gallery, Melbourne
- 1973 Womanvision, at Sydney Filmmaker's Co-op.
- 1975 Woman, an exhibition and publication by the Young Women's Christian Association of Australia for International Women's Year
- 1976/7, December–January Rennie Ellis and Carol Jerrems: Heroes and Anti-Heroes
- 1977 Hogarth Gallery, Sydney
- 1978, May–June; Four Australian Women, Carol Jerrems with Christine Godden, Christine Cornish and Jenny Aitken, Photographers' Gallery, South Yarra, Melbourne
- 1978, August–September; with Roderick McNicol, Pentax Brummels Gallery of Photography.

=== Posthumous ===
==== Solo ====
- 1990/91 Travelling exhibition Living in the 70s: Photographs by Carol Jerrems, curated by curators: Helen Ellis, Bob Jenyns, National Gallery of Australia, University of Tasmania, Plimsoll Gallery, Hobart, July–August 1990; Australian Centre for Photography, Sydney, New South Wales, August–September 1990; Australian National Gallery, Canberra, ACT, February–May 1991; Albury Regional Centre, Albury, New South Wales, May–June 1991; Shepparton Art Gallery, Shepparton, Victoria, June–July 1991; Exhibition Gallery, Waverley Centre, Melbourne, Victoria, August–September 1991.
- 2012/13, August–January; Carol Jerrems, Photographic artist, National Gallery of Australia, Parkes Place, Parkes, Canberra
- 2013, July–September; Carol Jerrems: photographic artist, Monash Gallery of Art, Victoria
- 2016/17, December–February; Carol Jerrems (1949–1980) Photographic Artist, Josef Lebovich Gallery, Sydney
- 2024/25, 30 November 2024 – 2 March 2025; Carol Jerrems: Portraits, National Portrait Gallery, Canberra

==== Group ====
- 1980, September to November; Aspects of the Philip Morris Collection: Four Australian Photographers, works of Carol Jerrems, Robert Besanko, Bill Henson and Grant Mudford, selected by director of the National Gallery of Australia, James Mollison, Australian Embassy, Paris, followed by a tour to regional Australia.
- 1988 Shades of Light: Photography and Australia 1839–1988, National Gallery of Australia, February–May.
- 1991 Counterpoints: Photographs by Carol Jerrems and Wesley Stacey, National Gallery of Australia, February–May.
- 1994/5 All in the Family: Selected Australian Portraits, National Portrait Gallery, Old Parliament House,
- 1995 Colonial Pastime to Contemporary Profession: 150 years of Australian Women's Art, Tasmanian Museum and Art Gallery, Hobart, Tasmania. March–July 1995
- 1995 Women Hold Up Half The Sky, National Gallery of Australia, Canberra, March–April 1995
- 2010 Candid Camera: Australian Photography 1950s – 1970s, Art Gallery of South Australia.
- 2010, August–October; Up close : Carol Jerrems with Larry Clark, Nan Goldin and William Yang, Heide Museum of Modern Art, Melbourne, with extensive catalogue
- 2011/12 What's in a face? aspects of portrait photography, Art Gallery of New South Wales, December 2011 – February 2012.
- 2025 The basement: photography from Prahran College (1968–1981), Museum of Australian Photography, March – May 2025.

== Publications ==
- "(in several issues)". Circus. University of Melbourne. Magazine Society. 1970.
- Jerrems, Carol; Fraser, Virginia, eds. (1974). A Book About Australian Women. Outback Press. ISBN 978-0-86888-007-5.
- Cinema papers, Global Village Cinema Publications, July 1977, p. cover, 30, 65
- Aspects of the Philip Morris Collection : Four Australian Photographers. Sydney and Paris: Visual Arts Board, Australian Embassy, Australia Council. 1980. ISBN 978-0-908024-33-9.
- Jerrems, Carol (1990). Living in the 70s : Photographs. curated by Helen Ennis, Bob Jenyns, Plimsoll Gallery (host institution). Art Exhibitions Committee, University of Tasmania. ISBN 978-0-85901-458-8.
- King, Natalie, ed. (2010). Up Close : Carol Jerrems with Larry Clark, Nan Goldin and William Yang. photographers Carol Jerrems, Larry Clark, Nan Goldin, William Yang. Heide Museum of Modern Art : Schwartz Publishing. ISBN 978-1-86395-501-0.

== Films ==
- 1975 Carol Jerrems; School's Out, 16mm film sequence in application for an Australia Council grant. Not completed.
- 1978 Hanging About: A Short Film by Carol Jerrems, (earlier known as Hanging Out), 16mm. Cast: Robyn Bucknall, Linda Piper, Kate Grenville, Richard Moir, Esben Storm. Cinematographer: Michael Edols; Production: Australian Film Commission

== Collections ==
- Art Gallery of South Australia
- National Gallery of Victoria
- National Library of Australia
- National Gallery of Australia
