= Jacky Redgate =

Australian artist (born 1955)

- Born: 24 April 1955 (age 71); Hammersmith
- Education: Sydney College of the Arts; University of Wollongong
- Known for: abstract photography

Jacky Redgate (born 1955) is an Australian-based artist who works as a sculptor, an installation artist, and photographer. Her work has been recognised in major solo exhibitions surveying her work has been included in many group exhibitions in Australia, Japan and England. Her works are included in major Australian galleries including the National Gallery and key state galleries.

== Early life and education ==
Born in Hammersmith, London, Redgate migrated to Australia with her family in 1967, settling in Adelaide, South Australia. She studied at the South Australian School of Art, University of South Australia, where she earned a Bachelor of Arts, Fine Arts (Sculpture) in 1980. She moved to Sydney in 1980.

In Sydney, Redgate studied at the Sydney College of the Arts, where she received a Graduate Diploma in Visual Arts (Photography) in 1984, followed by a Master of Visual Arts (Painting) in 1998. She earned a Doctorate of Creative Arts at the University of Wollongong (UOW) in 2013. She is currently a faculty member at the University of Wollongong, Australia. Her area of research is Visual Arts ad Crafts, and she oversees doctoral candidates.

During her 40-year career, Redgate has published few artist statements or biographical information. One detail that is known is that she once worked as a retail window dresser in Adelaide.

== Career ==
In her work, Redgate draws on conceptual ideas from Science, art history, aesthetics and even politics. She has also been influenced by early twentieth-century modernism, minimalism and advertising techniques in studio photography. She was actively involved in the early days of the Women's Art Movement in Adelaide during the 1970s, with her work appearing their publications and exhibitions.

She began her career working in photography, and many of her works focused on optics and what is revealed by gazes. Early photographic works that launched her career include the series Photographer Unknown (exhibited 1983) and Work-to-Rule (exhibited 1986). In photography she has explored what happens when a three-dimensional object is captured in two-dimensional media. For the Work-to-rule series Redgate constructed three-dimensional objects from common objects such as playing cards, ice cream cones and reels of thread. She then photographed them to create two-dimensional images that create abstract or unreal objects. From this early series, Redgate has continued to challenge perception of space and push the boundaries of what photography can do.

Redgate began to use mirrors and reflection more than two decades ago. She attached objects to mirrors on folding screens, such that the mirror reflections turned objects into abstract images. The works slip between representation (of objects) and abstract compositions.

In large works shown at the Geelong Art Gallery in 2020–2021, she incorporated references to her childhood, including teddy bears and dolls. They reflect her interest in the photographic works of America photographer Dare Wright, who in 1957 published a book about The Lonely Doll, a story about a doll and a teddy bear. These recent works also use mirrors, and abstract backgrounds that recall Redgate's earlier work.

== Awards and grants ==
Redgate has received competitive grants through the Visual Arts/Craft Board of the Australia Council for the Arts. In 1987 Redgate received an overseas fellowship residency, which she spent at Künstlerhaus Bethanien, Berlin. This art gallery provides studio space to support and promote contemporary artists.

In 2006 Redgate won first prize in the Josephine Ulrick and Win Schubert Photography Award.

In 2007 she received an Australia Council fellowship.

In 2011 she won first prize in the Bowness Photography Prize at the Monash Gallery of Art, Melbourne for her work Light Throw Mirrors #4 (2010). The senior curator of photography at the National Gallery of Australia, Shaun Larkin, said about the work:

‘It is virtually flawless as a photograph...challenging many of the expectations of what a photograph is.’

== Exhibitions ==
In 2005–2006 an exhibition (Jacky Redgate, Life of the System) at the Museum of Contemporary Art Australia, Sydney (MCA) was devoted to 25 years of her work in photography and sculpture.

In 2008 the Institute of Modern Art in Brisbane presented Jacky Redgate, Visions from her Bed, the title of the exhibition harking back to her hospitalisation at age three when she was already imagining images.

In 2009, a work "Mirror Mirror" was included in the "Then and Now" exhibition at the Institute of Modern Art in Brisbane.

In 2012, the Art Gallery of New South Wales presented a survey of Redgate's development from 1980 in an exhibition of her works in their collection. They reflect her interest in the photographic works of American photographer Dare Wright who, in 1957, published The Lonely Doll, a story about a doll and a teddy bear. These recent works also use mirrors, and abstract backgrounds that recall Redgate's earlier work.

In 2020 Redgate's photographs were included in the major exhibition of Australian women artists, Know My Name, at the National Gallery of Australia.

== Collections ==
Her work is held in the National Gallery of Australia, the Art Gallery of New South Wales, the Art Gallery of South Australia, and the National Gallery of Victoria.
