= WOPOP: Working Papers on Photography =

Australian photography journal

WOPOP: Working Papers on Photography was a short-lived non-profit academic photography journal irregularly published in nine issues between 1978 and 1983, which developed from a 1977 conference in Sydney and incorporated the proceedings of a later conference in Melbourne. It contributed research to the emerging field of photography history and historiography in Australia and exposed readers to significant international experts in the field.

== Background ==
In September/October 1977, amidst increasing interest in the medium and establishment of public collections, and the opening of an Australian Centre for Photography (ACP) by Margaret Whitlam in November 1974, Wayne Hooper of Sydney University convened a conference 'Photography in Australia', on photography as an art form and communication medium, at the Department of adult education at his University.

The conference was attended by 150 photographers, teachers, curators, librarians and students, many from interstate and each paying A$35 and travel and accommodation fees (a value of A$200 in 2021). From amongst the attendees Hooper set up a national committee of members interested in the history of the medium. At the 1978 annual general meeting of the ACP Hooper raised objection to the centre's lack of initiative in supporting such conferences and, as reported by Anne-Marie Willis in the Nation Review, bemoaned its Sydney-centrism.

== Establishment ==
In December 1977, the Sydney conference delegates joined Euan McGillivray and Matthew Nickson in proposing, and then establishing, a journal WOPOP: Working Papers on Photography. From a terrace house at 20 Wellington Street, Richmond, in Melbourne, McGillivray and Nickson edited and irregularly published nine numbers of the staple-bound journal between 1978 and 1983.

In 1980, when McGillivray was employed as curator at the Science Museum, they published proceedings of a follow-up Australian Photography Conference convened by the journal over September 19–21, 1980 at Prahran College where the pair had studied under Athol Shmith and John Cato. Presentations included a report by cultural historian Anne-Marie Willis on her research into nineteenth-century photography supported by the Australian Gallery Directors Council; 'Mods and Docos' by Helen Grace, Charles Merewether, Toni Schofield and Terry Smith; and international papers including Allan Sekula's 'The Frame in Photography'; and British art historian Kenneth Coutts-Smith's paper on German poster artist Klaus Stack, with an exhibition of Stack's work relating to the style of John Heartfield. Other speakers were Curator of Photography at the Art Gallery of NSW Gael Newton, Foundation Chairman of Standards Australiaʼs Committee on Signs and Symbols David Sless, photography lecturer John Cato, Macleay Museum curator Allan Davies and art historian Shar Jones.

WOPOP joined contemporaries amongst 'serious' art journals; Art & Text, Artlink, Art Network, Lip, Photofile and Praxis.

== Ethos ==
WOPOP adopted a Marxist perspective, proclaiming that it would "consider photography as a medium of communication as well as an art form," with a "focus...on the social usage of photography as on the images themselves," by "drawing on sociology, history, literature, politics, aesthetics, anthropology and linguistics."

== Contents ==
Amongst its contents the journal published criticism, theory, historical and technical articles, on conservation and preservation, picture collection and communication, reported on research in progress, and listed the grants for photographic research, practice and display available from the Australia Council. When local content was not available it reprinted essays from international commentators including A. D. Coleman, and J.C. Sherer and, as Print Letter reported in 1978,

"articles by John Berger and Artforum's Alan Sekula, with a liberal dollop of Kozloff (or, if you prefer, a dollop of liberal Kozloff) thrown in for good measure."

The contents of WOPOP Issue No.1 of 1978 included an editorial by Euan McGillivray and Matthew Nickson, and articles; "John Heartfield" by Matthew Nickson; "Futurology & Photography" by Graeme Johanson (Latrobe Library, State Library of Victoria); "LaTrobe Library Picture Collection" by Jenny Carew (acting Picture Librarian, Latrobe Library, State Library of Victoria); "Sontag on Photography" by Ann-Marie Willis; "Silver" by Matthew Nickson; "A Constitution Lost" by Ann-Marie Willis; "Australian Women Photographers" by Jenni Mather.

Issue No.5 December 1979 is headed by McGillivray and Nickson's editorial, and includes articles '...A Not So New Non Silver Process' by 'the Editors'; 'China Cheesecake'; 'On the Subject of John Szarkowski' by A.D. Coleman; 'Pictures, Words and History' by Jozef Gross; 'Dismantling Modernism, Reinventing Documentary (Notes on the Politics of representation)' by Allan Sekula; and Ian Cosier 'An Australian Photographic Data Base: A Research Resource'.

In issue 7 McGillivray reported on research into the collection of Richard Daintree negatives at the Science Museum of Victoria

Issue No.8 included Johansen's investigation of German photographer of Australian indigenous people, J. W. Lindt.

Issue No.9 contained, amongst other articles, Nick Lottkowitz, 'Conservation and restoration, some chemical thoughts.'

== Cessation ==
Finding suitable content for the journal required considerable and far-reaching research, and led to new interests for the editors; on reading Carroll Hart's 'The New Documentation: Oral History and Photography', Nickson, who with McGillivray was then becoming interested in the planning and execution of historical photograph preservation, wrote to the author on January 1, 1983, about her involvement in the project. In issue 9, of July 1983, Sherry Konter's 'Final Report' on the Vanishing Georgia Project was printed beside the editors' proposal for the Australian Bicentenary; 'Australia as Australians Saw It. A Comprehensive Pictorial Record of our Heritage: 1839–1939'; and their 'Position Paper— February 1983'.

Australian National Library bibliographer Victor Crittenden hailed the latter project as "most important," an;

...endeavour to create a comprehensive national index of photographic images. Entitled for the present 'Australia as Australians saw it', this project is to canvass the public to arouse awareness of the importance of photographs of the past; to invite the public to submit photographs and to allow them to be copied, and to provide a subject approach to the photographs, with appropriate cross-references, by means of a computer-based indexing program.

Their idea was mercilessly critiqued by Tim Robinson of the Council of the City of Sydney Archives for the ambitious scale of a project that would digitise 500,000 images and computerise their cataloguing, storage and retrieval;

It is obvious from the submission and the position paper that WOPOP has not the slightest conception of the logistics of copying such a number of photographs, let alone documenting them and 'fully' indexing them. Even with the computer programme they describe, and there is no evidence that it has been tested in any way, the entire project would be of vast proportions with no guarantee of success. The money would surely be better spent on collections already held and in need of attention.

WOPOP ceased publication that year with issue 9 when McGillivray and Nickson moved on to inaugurate the Museum of Victoria's Outreach Project in 1985 to realise their ambition, expressed in that last issue, to compile a national archive of Australian documentary, vernacular and historically significant photographs up to 1939, the centenary of the Daguerreotype. To do so, the pair issued a call for Australians: "to sit down with your family, look through your collection of photographs and select those which you and your family think should be included in the heritage of Australia," requesting specifically photographs of "members of your family at work, play, or engaged in leisure time activities...".

== Legacy ==
Several Australian contributors to WOPOP: Working Papers on Photography, especially Ann-Marie Willis who provided several of its articles, Jenni Mather and Graeme Johanson went on to publish books of substantial photo-historical research, and Jenny Carew's articles for other journals treated historical subjects.
