= Debra Phillips =

Australian photographer (born 1958)

- Born: 1958 (age 67–68); Melbourne, Australia
- Education: Dip. Art, 1977–1979 Sydney College of the Arts, University of Sydney, NSW. MVA, 1987–1990 Sydney College of the Arts, University of Sydney, NSW. BA, 1982 Sydney College of the Arts, University of Sydney, NSW
- Occupations: Artist: Photographer, sculptor

Debra Phillips (born 1958) is an Australian artist. Her main practice is photography, but she also works across other forms such as sculpture and moving image. She has been an exhibiting artist since the 1980s, is included in many collections, and has won multiple awards for her work. Phillips resides in Sydney and is a senior lecturer at The College of Fine Arts, University of New South Wales.

== Biography ==
Debra Phillips was born in Melbourne, Australia, in 1958. In 1977, Phillips relocated to Sydney, Australia, to start a Diploma of Art at Sydney College of the Art, University of Sydney, NSW. Starting in the 1980s, her works have been a part of many solo and group exhibitions across Australia, totalling in 54 exhibitions. Still residing in Sydney today, Phillips is a senior lecturer at the College of Fine Arts, University of New South Wales.

== Work and publications ==
Debra Phillips was one of the women artists of the 1980s and early 1990s. Her work encapsulates her personal interests in questioning different forms of representation, histories, and identity.

Recurring themes in her art include disappearance and obsolescence, contemporary life, and the use of photography as a structure of representation—challenging the notion that photography presents a true perception of the real world. Her work represents a collapse of time into the present. It is self-consciously aesthetic, this allows the viewer to think about the images resist becoming just surface appearances or if they invite fear of depth/deeper meanings.

Phillips is represented in private, national, and international collections. Her work has been published in numerous places, including: Twelve Australian Photo Artists (Blair French and Daniel Palmer, Sydney: Piper Press, 2009) and in Look: Contemporary Australian Photography Since 1980 (Anne Marsh, Melbourne: MacMillan Art Publishing, 2010).

== Notable works ==
=== Balance of obsolescence (1987) ===
This series of Type C photographs (100.0 × 100.0 cm) was part of a solo exhibition at the First Draft gallery, Sydney, and also a group exhibition, "Constructed Images" at The Australian National Gallery, Canberra in 1987. In 1989 it was part of exhibition "Tableaux Mourant: Photography and Death", Fine Arts Gallery, University of Tasmania, Hobart. Now it is part of the Art Gallery of NSW collection.

=== Series "The Colonisation of time" X (1990) ===
This cibachrome series (119 × 149 × 5 cm) by Debra Phillips focuses on photography's links to science and technology as well as placing a large emphasis on westernisation. The title suggests issues between European colonisation in Australia and the rapid technology progress throughout the globalised world. Each photograph in the series features a large X that crosses the image. This help supports the interrelated themes of colonisation, photography, time, representation, technology and the land.

=== Untitled 2 "From the street" (1997) ===
This image is part of the series "From the Street" which includes 18 black and white images printed onto metallic silver paper, aluminium (100 × 150 cm). The series was created in the early days of Phillips's practice when she had an interest in traces of everyday life, surrounding street and graffiti. When viewed individually, this image becomes an abstract element that alludes to the mutable and ephemeral qualities of codes.

== Exhibitions ==
Total of 54 group or solo exhibitions both national and international. Exhibitions include galleries such as:

- 2008: Contemporary Australia: Optimism, Queensland Art Gallery/Gallery of Modern Art, Brisbane.
- 2006: The Captain's Ghost: Three contemporary artists on Cook, Adam Art Gallery, Victoria University of Wellington, New Zealand.
- 2004: COFA Fundraising Exhibition, Ivan Dougherty Gallery, Sydney, NSW.
- 2000: Death and Decoration, Plimsoll Gallery, University of Tasmania, Hobart, TAS.
- 1998: Site, Parliament House, Canberra, ACT.
- 1996: Photography is Dead! Long Live Photography!, Museum of Contemporary Art, Sydney, NSW.
- 1995: Debra Phillips: Work 1992-1995, Art Gallery New South Wales, Sydney, NSW.
- 1981: with Rick Bolzan, Bondi Pavilion, Sydney, NSW.

== Collections ==
- Art Gallery of New South Wales, Sydney, NSW, Australia
- Tate Gallery, London, England, UK
- Library of the Museum of Modern Art, New York City, United States
- The National Gallery of Australia, Canberra, ACT
- Parliament House, Canberra, ACT
- Maison Européenne de la Photographie, Paris, France
- Artbank

== Books ==
- Debra Phillips, Index, Sydney, 1995
- Debra Phillips, Source, Sydney, 1999

== Awards ==
- 2007, Recipient – COFA Travel Grant (Academic Staff)
- 2005, National Photographic Purchase Award, Albury Regional Art Gallery
- 2002, Australia Council New Work Grant
- 1996, Australia Council Visual Arts/Craft Fund Fellowship
- 1982, Recipient – Australia Council Visual Arts Board Travel Grant
