= Robert Besanko =

Australian photographic artist

Robert Besanko (born 1951) is a self-taught Australian photographic artist who lives and works in Melbourne.

== Early life ==
Robert Besanko was born in the NSW country town of Temora, where his father was an upholsterer.

Besanko had enjoyed photography as a hobby and in 1971, at twenty, started producing work using high-contrast orthochromatic Kodalith reprographic paper. His extensive work in the darkroom reduced contrast in the mid-tones and produced a red-brown tonality with rich blacks.

In 1976 Besanko traveled to the Rencontres d'Arles festival of Photography, France, where when he saw that Australians represented were producing work of an international standard, his "feeling of insecurity was taken away.”

== Recognition ==
Besanko's first solo show of this work at the The Photographers' Gallery and Workshop over February and March 1978 was reviewed in an extensive article by Beatrice Faust in The Age, who remarked "that a lot of Robert Besanko's work is vaguely derivative, I am not putting, him down. I simply mean that he is a consolidator more than an innovator or a decadent," then, on the cropping and fragmentation in his imagery, finds "echoes of Ralph Gibson. But where Gibson is eerie, grim, depersonalised, Besanko is charming, warm and intimate....there is a segment – mid-calf to mid-torso – of a person playing with an inflated tyre tube in a pool. If Gibson segmented someone like this, the result would be bizarre; with Besanko, it's playful."

Though habitually taciturn, Besanko, when interviewed in the Sydney student magazine Tharunka about the same show, offered this explanation of it:

I have been making photographs for six years now. Prior to 1971 it was a case of a dreamer without a medium. My work has been the intellectualisation, the making external, and therefore making use of my dream state. The reason I've chosen this medium is the attraction for the direct path from my mind, to the subject, to the print; retaining the integrity of the vision, and creating an illusion of reality. I am aware of a high point, an inbuilt golden mean that I need to achieve. Making something beautiful is another motivation for working. I hope they communicate warmth and an intangible quality, as well as being explicit.

The Bulletin followed in August 1978 by including him in a series of profiles in a cover story devoted to 'Newsmakers of the 1980s' which featured Besanko as a worker "in the lonely world of artistic photography," who at twenty, taught himself photography, quoting him on that decision: "There are three or four techs in Melbourne but I knew that I didn’t want to go to them. I put in all my time at it. A lot of people fail simply because they don’t do enough work.” The article notes that he had sold eighteen prints from his first solo exhibition at the Photographers’ Gallery followed in June "by a one-man show at the Australian Centre for Photography in Sydney" in June, and his ambition "to get to New York, which he says is the world capital of artistic photography, with at least 50 galleries devoted to the field."

Folios of Besanko's work appeared in Laurence Le Guay's 1978 Australian photography, a contemporary view (in which reviewer Tony Perry notes the poor colour reproduction of Besdanko's Kodaliths); issue 3 of Light Vision (January–February 1978); and the March 1978 issue of Creative Camera dedicated to Australian photographers. That year, his work was acquired by the National Gallery of Victoria with that of Richard Harris, Bill Henson, Merryle Johnson, Jon Rhodes and Laurie Wilson, and Beatrice Faust commented on the acquisition by the National Gallery of Australia of Robert Besanko's "delicate erotic fragments."

In 1979, the Visual Art Board granted him $2,500 toward travel to Japan and the United Kingdom, and his work included in the collection of the National Gallery of Australia was published in the 1979 Australian photographers: the Philip Morris Collection, and the 1980 catalogue of its traveling show Aspects of the Philip Morris Collection: four Australian photographers at the Australian Embassy in Paris, 1980, then touring regional centres in Australia. That year Besanko received a further $2,000 travel grant from the Visual Arts board, and he became one of the first artists to undertake a residency at the newly established Australia Council Greene Street Studio in New York. In a review of Photography–The Last Ten Years: Photographs from the collection of the Australian National Gallery, Melville Hall, Australian National University, 5 August–7 October 1980, Garry Raffaele singled out Besanko as one of "Australians of performance and of promise" beside Max Dupain, Grant Mudford and Roger Scott. His work appeared with that of Carol Jerrems, Bill Henson and Grant Mudford in the Biennale de Paris which was opened on 23 September 1980 by the Australian Ambassador in France John Russell Rowland AO.

In 1981 Besanko met Alain Sayag, curator the Centre Pompidou in Paris who had just become the head of the newly established Photography Department there and was developing its collection. He exhibited Robert Besanko et la photographie australienne aujourd'hui; and subsequently acquired 12 of his Kodalith photographs from the exhibition. Michael Hoppen Gallery in London was representing Besanko between 1998 and 2004.

Anne O'Hehir in 1994 writes that Besanko's use of Kodalith paper "produced prints with sepia-tones reminiscent of nineteenth-century photographers. The flattened and abstracted quality of his images also has a feel of the 1920s art deco movement." The aesthetic of Besanko's work therefore depends much on qualities of the Kodalith paper that was discontinued in 1976. He stopped producing prints when it later became unavailable or out of date, protesting that "there is no other way to do it. I am a purist," devoted to the "interesting blacks" and "emotional look" of the paper. His repeated efforts to persuade Kodak to revive the product were unsuccessful, and in the late 1990s he started looking at producing digital prints, but it was not until the collaboration with the printer Tim Handfield and then Les Walkling that he produced prints he deemed satisfactory. The large-scale digital prints he produced with Handfield and Walkling were exhibited at the Australian Centre for Photography alongside his vintage Kodalith prints and changed over each month for a year.

The Sydney dealer Josef Lebovic in 1995 showed a selection Australian Photography 1900–1970s, hung alphabetically so, as reviewer Cochrane noted: "it begans [sic] with six images by self-taught Robert Besanko, who sells most of his work in America, France and Japan." He distinguishes Besanko as "unusual among Australian photographers with an international reputation in that he is still based in this country, in Melbourne."

== Critical reception ==
Anne-Marie Willis in the Nation Review critique of his 1978 show at the Australian Centre for Photography counted 22 "depersonalised" female subjects among his 34 images who turn away from the camera or whose heads are cropped out;

a shot of a woman lying down with her legs open exposing her pubic area through a flimsy dress - and the picture stops abruptly at her neck. Besanko's close cropping excludes the women from physical or social space. They are drained of individuality by his, romantic, mildly erotic, view of them. The women expose their breasts and bottoms, lift up their dresses and prance naked in the bathroom for the photographer. Robert Besanko's photographs are examples of a watered down kind of sexism...not as blatantly offensive as full color Penthouse cheesecake or David Hamilton [but] as insidious • because it perpetuates the delicate and fragile stereotype of [and] misty and gentle ideal of women...

Though understanding that "Robert Besanko's use of mysterious closeups and cutoffs was not directly influenced by Ralph Gibson," Willis considers it significant that Gibson on a visit to Australia was "impressed" by his work. She finds his use of Kodalith paper "capricious" and questions whether he was "just naively experimenting with a new technique." Besanko's exhibition at the photography gallery of the Centre George Pompidou in June 1981, for which funding was supplied by a Visual Arts Board grant, was reviewed by "H.G." in Le Monde Diplomatique:

L'Australien Robert Besanko a réussi à se construire un univers à partir de quelques idées visuelles. L'objectif, amoureusement, tourne autour du corps de la femme. Il l'habille de fleurs blanches, fait surgir des nuques très pâles sur la trame fine d'un tirage sépia. Le cadre le reconstruit différemment, pour un fétichisme généralisé. [translation: "The Australian Robert Besanko has succeeded in creating an entire visual universe from a handful of visual ideas. His lens, with evident affection, revolves around the female body. He adorns it with white flowers, bringing forth very pale napes against the delicate texture of a sepia print. The framing reconstructs it in different ways, producing an overall fetishism."].

Beatrice Faust in her 1981 Women, sex & pornography writes that "the erotic artist is not limited to documenting raw sex but is free to express his own vision," and uses an image by Besanko as an example:

[It] is simple enough to be seen as a near-abstract pattern in black and white. The gesture implied by the curve of the skirt and the angle of the girl's arm hints at a situation lasting through time, inviting the viewer to speculate about what has already happened and what may yet happen. The mood is both saucy and a little mysterious. Pornography differs from erotica because the former genre does not deal in speculation or nuance while the latter may.

In 1988 McIntyre in The Age interviewed the "almost chronically" shy Besanko when his survey show (which for its prior tour of Victorian regional galleries had one veiled full-frontal nude removed "for display purposes") was in Sydney at King Street Studios. Remarking on the "marvellous graphic qualities" of his work as "masterpieces of ambiguity; physical, sexual, sensual, and spatial...a peculiarly personal vision" born of isolation, he quoted Besanko: "You are aware of what the image can become, when you look at the subject. The signature is the lyrical line — the 'otherness' - and the intimacy. I strive for the essence . . .but more as well. The eroticism is the humanity, if you do not deny it." Sydney Morning Herald critic Martyn Jolly writing in 1988 of the same exhibition Robert Besanko Photographs 1973-1981, found the work anachronistic, and was dismissive of his "romantic, self-consciously arty photography" typical of the 1970s and in Melbourne particularly, and remarked that "entering King Street Studios is like travelling back in time. Not only are the images all too familiar, but their mode of presentation - as sacred morsels of the artist's oh-so-refined sensibility - recalls everything from which photography sought to extricate itself." Of a show of 47 vintage Australian photographs over August–September 1988 and also in Sydney, reviewer Max Dupain remarked that though the show was small and "old-fashioned": "there is abundance of subject material: the urban scene, the beach, the portrait and the figure. Robert Besanko's strong and simplistic forms of the beach figure in semi-silhouette is cropped heroically: just the bare bones are retained."

International reaction was positive. As reported in The Observer, the rarity of Besanko's work, when the supply of the discontinued photographic paper dwindled, impressed gallerist Michael Hoppen enough that he was reported to have "bought the whole lot. 'I have never done that before. It was like some kind of first date; I fell head-over-heels,'...Later, when Hoppen took some of the photographs to New York, people were queueing up to buy them. The new [1998] exhibition, at his London gallery, of the remaining 20 images promises to be a sell-out. But then what? There just aren't any more pictures left." Of his 1999 solo exhibition at Hoppen's gallery Maddy Costa remarks in the Evening Standard that Besanko's photographs "are elegant and eloquent. His images of women, whether fragments of their bodies or snatches of their clothing are gloriously enigmatic, captivating the viewer into a closer examination of closed eyes, layered fabric and delicate patterns," and elsewhere writing that they have the look of "soft graphite drawings, a remarkable effect he achieves when printing. His work is laced with an old-fashioned sensuality: faces are lost as the camera concentrates on the curves of the body instead."

Ian North reviewing the 2002 exhibition Second Sight: Australian Photography at the National Gallery of Victoria questions why, when its curator Isobel Crombie acknowledges the "creative explosion" of the 1970s, the decade was not given more weight in the survey exhibition. Reflecting on the "politics of taste" he asks: "What of Robert Besanko's wayward vision, for example - was it less important than the currently cultish Pat Brassington's?"

Robert McFarlane considered that "the presence of several images by Melbourne photographer Robert Besanko...added strength" to Magic Realism at the Art Gallery of New South Wales in 2006:. "The oblique eroticism of Besanko's compositions, bathed in their pale "Kodalith" tonality, form a unique body of work in Australian photography."

== Awards ==
- 1979: Visual Arts Board Grant
- 1981: Visual Arts Board Grant: $2,000 costs of travel and exhibition at the Pompidou Centre in Paris

== Selected solo exhibitions ==
- 1977: Robert Besanko, Upstairs Gallery, Perth, WA, Australia
- 1978, 2 February – 6 March: Robert Besanko. The Photographers' Gallery and Workshop
- 1978, 24 May–17 June: Robert Besanko – Photographs, Australian Centre for Photography, Sydney, NSW, Australia
- 1979: solo show Canon Gallery, Amsterdam
- 1979: solo, Santa Cruz, California
- 1981, June: Robert Besanko et la photographie australienne aujourd'hui,Centre Pompidou, Paris, France
- 1981, June: Interim: 12 images by Robert Besanko Photographer. The Private Art Gallery, Windsor, Melbourne
- 1984, 29 September–17 October: Robert Besanko - prints. Robin Gibson Gallery, Darlinghurst, Sydney
- 1988 Robert Besanko Photographs, Mornington Peninsula Art Centre, Mornington, VIC, Australia
- 1988, July–August: Robert Besanko Photographs 1973–1981, King Street Studios (touring Victorian Regional Galleries, starting in Ararat), Sydney, NSW, Australia
- 1993 ロバート・ベサンコ Robert Besanko, Zeit-Foto, Tokyo, Japan
- 1998 Besanko, Michael Hoppen, London, UK
- 1999, 9 September–23 October: Besanko, Michael Hoppen, London, UK
- 2013, 2 March–-19 May: Robert Besanko: Contemplations, Australian Centre for Photography, Sydney, NSW, Australia

== Selected group exhibitions ==
- 1978, March: The Philip Morris Arts Grant 5th annual exhibition, Forty Photographers: Recent Australian Photography, Adelaide Festival
- 1979, 25 May – 24 June: Benefit Exhibition. Photographers: Greg Wayn, Brett Weston, Les Walkling, Paul Caponigro, Edna Bullock, Wynn Bullock, Aaron Siskind, John Cato, Ralph Gibson, Robert Besanko, Boone Morrison. The Photographers' Gallery and Workshop
- 1980, 23 September: Aspects of the Philip Morris Collection: four Australian photographers. Besanko with Carol Jerrems, Bill Henson and Grant Mudford at the Australian Embassy for the Biennale de Paris, then touring regional centres in Australia
- 1980, 5 August–7 October: Photography–The Last Ten Years: Photographs from the collection of the Australian National Gallery, Melville Hall, Australian National University
- 1987, 13 June to 13 September: Living in the 70s: Australian photographs, Gallery 11, Australian National Gallery.
- 1988, to 3 September: Australian Photography 1928-1988. Garry Anderson Gallery
- 1995: 14 January–4 June: On The Edge: Australian photographers of the Seventies. National Gallery of Australia's Philip Morris Collection of photography on exhibition at the San Diego Museum of Art
- 1995, from 24 June: Australian Photography 1900–1970s. Josef Lebovic, Paddington NSW
- 1996, 7–24 November: 20th Anniversary Exhibition Ralph Gibson, Ian Lobb, Marcus Bunyan, Harry Callahan, Christopher Koller, Aaron Siskind, Gayle Slater, Paul Caponigro, Francis Busby, Hans Namuth, Les Walkling, Lisette Model, Greg Elms, Larry Clark, Kylie Hamill, Wyn Bullock, Rosemary McKeoun, William Clift, Jeff Busby, Duane Michals, Rennie Ellis, Karen Rawady, Edouard Boubat, Carol Jerrems, Eikoh Hosoe, John Cato, Peter Leiss, William Eggleston, Robert Besanko, Paul Nadalin, John Divola, Colin Vickery, Eliot Porter, Warren Brenninger, Emmet Gowin, Bill Henson. The Photographers' Gallery and Workshop
- 1998, 22 October – 8 November: Contemporary Australian Artists, The William Heimerman Collection. Artists: Amy Barker, Peter Barker, Robert Besanko, John Billan, Tiffany Bishop, Warren Brenninger, Marcus Bunyan, Francis Busby, Jeff Busby, Kerry Clark, Christine Cornish, Daniella Donate, Rennie Ellis, Greg Elms, Francesca Golotta, Fiona Hall, Kylie Hamill, William Heimerman, Bill Henson, Carol Jerrems, Christopher Koller, Peter Leiss, Jean Marc Lepechoux, Ian Lobb, Rosemary Mckeoun, Denise Moore, Paul Nadalin, Harry Nankin, Susan Purdy, Karen Rawady, Katherine Reeves, Kaye Rentil, Allison Ross, Mic Siranni, Gayle Slater, Anke Stacker, Virginia Stobart, Colin Vickery, Les Walkling, Konrad Winkler. The Photographers' Gallery and Workshop
- 2000, 21–26 June: Michael Hoppen Gallery stand, Besanko with Roger Ballen, Peter Beard, Harold Edgerton, Stephane Graff, Ernst Haas, Lucien Hervé, Elemérné Marsovszky, David Parker, Giles Revell. Art Basel Art Fair
- 2004: Australian Photography 1928-2004, Director's Choice, 164 images by photographers including Besanko, David Moore, Olive Cotton, Greg Barrett, Robert McFarlane, Tim Page, Rex Dupain, Jon Lewis, Brett Hilder, Roger Scott, Robert Whitaker and others. Josef Lebovic Gallery, Paddington NSW.
- 2006, February–April: Magical Realism: exhibition of 30 photographs from the 1970s; Besanko with Robert Ashton, Kate Breakey, Peter Charuk, Ian Dodd, Victoria Fernandez, Philip Quirk and Juliana Swatko. Art Gallery of New South Wales
- 2007, August–September: Focus on Women. Josef Lebovic Gallery, Paddington, NSW
- 2013, 2 March–19 May: Besanko with Ian North, Brad Buckley and John Conomos. Australian Centre for Photography, Sydney

== Collections ==
- Art Gallery of New South Wales
- Bibliothèque nationale de France
- Centre Pompidou
- Horsham Regional Art Gallery
- Museum of Fine Arts, Houston
- National Gallery of Australia
- National Gallery of Victoria
