= The Photographers' Gallery and Workshop =

Australian photography gallery in Melbourne 1973–2010

Coordinates: 37.841472°S 144.985983°E

The Photographers' Gallery and Workshop (1973–2010) was an Australian photography gallery established in South Yarra, Melbourne, and which ran almost continuously for nearly 40 years. Its representation, in the 1970s and 1980s, of contemporary and mid-century, mostly American and some European original fine prints from major artists was influential on Australian audiences and practitioners, while a selection of the latter's work sympathetic to the gallery ethos was shown alternately and then dominated the program.

== Other uses ==
An unrelated space also called "The Photographers' Gallery" ran for three years from 1989–1992 in Brisbane; another, the Photographer's Gallery [sic], was operating in Sydney in the c.1993-2000s at 96 Reserve Road, Artarmon,; and the 2006 Head-On Portrait Prize Exhibition was held in Balmain, also in Sydney at a short-lived venue called "The Photographers Gallery".

== History ==
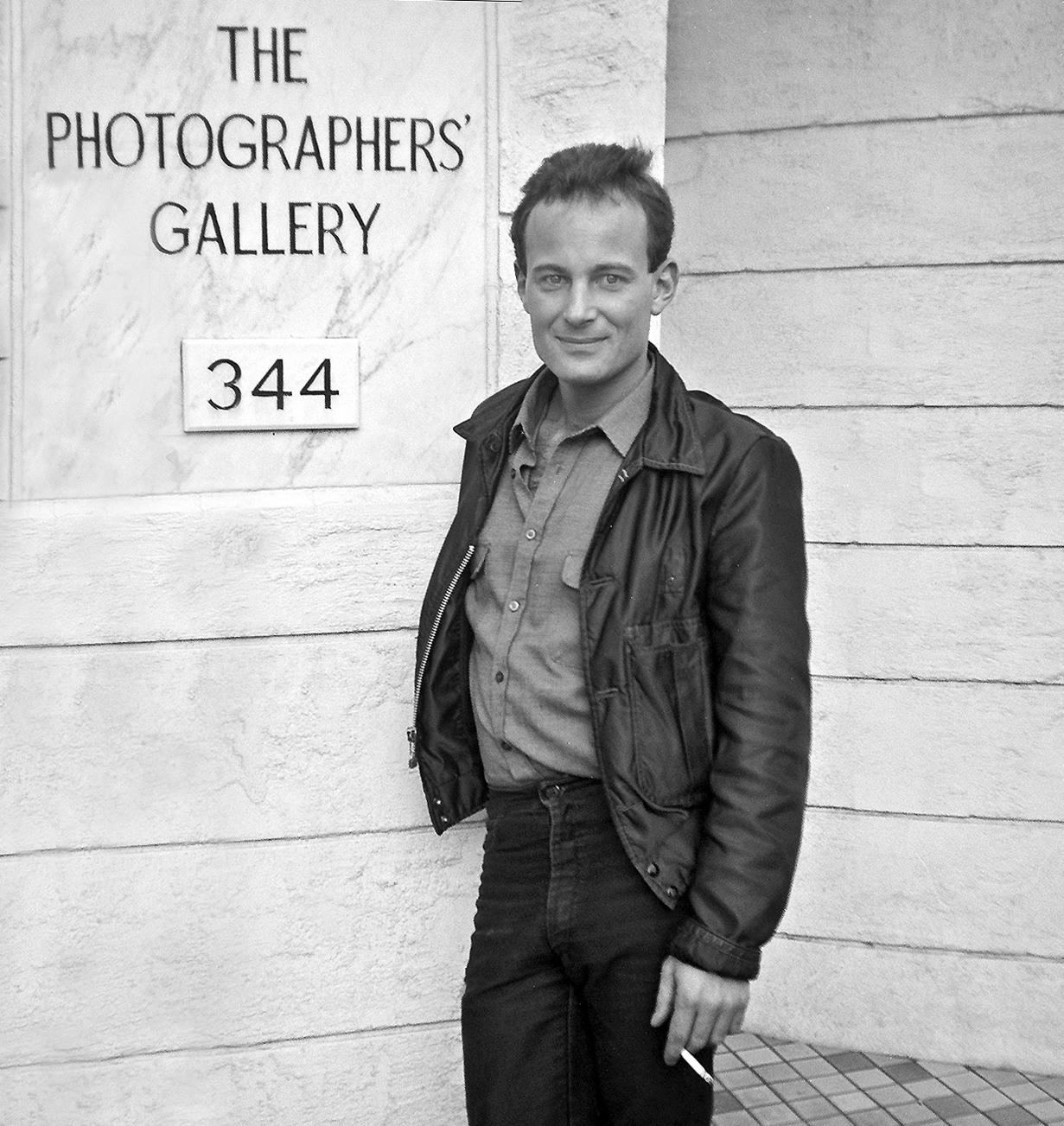
William Heimerman director of The Photographers' Gallery and Workshop at the door of the gallery, photographed by Jeff Busby, c.1980

Paul Cox, Ingeborg Tyssen, John F. Williams and Rod McNicol founded The Photographers' Gallery and Workshop in 1973 at 344 Punt Road, South Yarra in an 1888 two-storey fruiterer's shop and dwelling (originally a bootmaker's) in the 'Sharp's Buildings' terrace, rented since 1965 as a photographer's studio and accommodation by Paul Cox, who from 1969–c.1980 taught cinematography at Prahran College.

It was the second gallery devoted to photography to be established in the city after Rennie Ellis' and Robert Ashton's Brummels Gallery, which was started in 1972 less than a kilometre away, and before the Church Street Photography Centre run by Joyce Evans in neighbouring Richmond (1976).

=== Gallery ===
Ian Lobb, an Australian born in 1948, who had undertaken workshops with Ansel Adams and Paul Caponigro, took over the Gallery in late 1974. Also that year, Lobb was teaching photography at Coburg Technical School with Carol Jerrems, and they met American Bill Heimerman (born 13 January 1950) who was teaching English at the same institution and was renting rooms above the gallery; the two inspired Heimerman's interest in photography. Lobb mounted his first exhibition as director at the beginning of 1975. He and Heimerman became co-directors of the gallery from the beginning of 1976. Beside some government funding and sales, both financially supported their roles through teaching, Heimerman being next employed at Brighton Technical College, where he and other staff members established a photography program, and then at the Council of Adult Education. Critic and photography lecturer Tony Perry noted Heimerman's 'detached, informed view of photography'.

Lobb and Heimerman showed some local work but, as Helen Ennis notes; "imported exhibitions of fine art photography by Paul Caponigro, William Clift, Emmet Gowin and other American" and some European, photographers for exhibitions. The first exhibition of international photography at the gallery was that of Paul Caponigro in 1975 which sold 22 prints, after which success the gallery was closed for renovations, during which time Heimerman made a trip to the US to secure more shows. After the refurbishment Melbourne Times critic Wendy Harmer described the space as "an oasis of pristine white walls and warm, polished wood.

=== Workshop ===
As well as exhibitions, and from the outset, workshops were held in the gallery building from which part of the funding for the enterprise was derived. The two floors of the terrace building accommodated a two-person darkroom available for film development and printing, and a demonstration room with 6-8 student capacity. Printing for exhibitions was offered. Technical instruction for beginners and in the Zone System for those more advanced was provided at first by Australian photographer Steven Lojewski in 1976. Evening classes ran for ten weeks. By 1977 Heimerman and Lobb had organised the first workshop to be conducted in Australia by an American photographer, Ralph Gibson, and sponsored another, of 6 days by William Clift in May 1978 (costing participants $200), before Lobb left to pursue his own photography later that year. Jeff Busby, who also exhibited at the gallery, took over later as Heimerman's assistant.

Among the more recent workshops was 'How Joshua Greene Saved Marilyn Monroe: Techniques to Rehabilitate Ageing Photographs and the Art of Digital Printing', held on 26 November 2002 by the son of Milton H. Greene who photographed Monroe.

In addition to its activities at its own premises was the Gallery's organisation and sponsorship of seminars by international photographers, which began with Ralph Gibson's on 11 August 1977 at Prahran College, then that of Harry Callahan, held on 20 November 1979 at the Prahran Recreational Centre, 147 High Street with also a workshop at the Gallery.

== Ethos ==
By showcasing the silver gelatin 'fine print' Lobb and Heimerman hoped to improve Australian work by example, as Lobb observed,

"From 1975, every second show was an international show [. . .] The initial philosophy was simply to let people see the physical difference between the production of prints overseas and locally."

In 1981 however, The Age newspaper listed the gallery's aims as being;

"to show international photography as well as supporting young Australians who are exploring new areas of creative and conceptual photography.

== Reception ==
Curator Joyce Agee in 1988 noted that, with feminist photography on the ascendant, the gallery's ambitions irritated some Australian women photographers;

In the 1970s, Micky Allan, the late Carol Jerrems, Ruth Maddison, Sue Ford and Ponch Hawkes, reacting against the technocratic and patriarchal American West Coast 'fine print' tradition then being promoted by The Photographers' Gallery in Melbourne, began to use photography as an intimate expression of their individual concerns.

Nevertheless, Jerrems was amongst the first exhibitors at the Gallery, showing there four times before her premature death in 1980. Noted women's activist Beatrice Faust, who reviewed many of the gallery's shows from 1976-88 in The Age newspaper, was supportive in her critiques, and in September 1987 hosted the show Beatrice Faust Curates: From Boubat to Fereday at the gallery featuring male and female photographers.

Certainly women exhibiting were outnumbered by men in a ratio of nearly 10:1 until the 90s, after which they appear on a more equal footing (see below).

The Gallery's concentration on American photography in its early years was not in isolation and was prompted as much by interest in international photography amongst Australians as by Heimerman's own contacts in the US, and paralleled international touring exhibitions of Bill Brandt in 1971, and the French Foreign Ministry's major exhibition of Henri Cartier-Bresson in 1974. Joyce Evans' Church Street also presented work by American's Minor White, Jerry Uelsmann, Les Krims and others.

In mid-1978, the gallery extended a call in the pages of the magazine Light Vision to Australian photographers to submit work for a survey that was to be a traveling exhibition. The final selection, featured in the journal in a double number, 6 and 7, titled 'Special Australian Edition', issued October 1978 with two samples across double-page spreads of each of 21 photographers, many represented and selected by the Photographers Gallery, among them a number who were also 'Correspondents' for Light Vision at the time. Editor Jean-Marc Le Pechoux acknowledged the cooperative nature of the venture in his editorial, and in her introduction art historian and critic Memory Holloway emphasised the breadth of the selection; "...a plurality of techniques, ideologies and styles; social documentary; pictorial, surreal landscapes; nudes; portraits; straight photography." Four of the 21 contributors were women, but the exercise marked a shift in the program toward a gender-inclusive representation of Australian photographers of diverse styles and often radical attitudes to picture-making and photographic printing and presentation.

Tony Perry, who reviewed shows there 1978-80, was complimentary of contributions by William Heimermann and the 'Photographers Gallery' to Australian Photography in his article 'Australia: looking for a photographic identity', as was Peter Turner's interview with Paul Cox in Light Vision.

In 1981, The Age newspaper critic Geoff Strong, in reporting on the imminent closure of Joyce Evans' Church Street gallery, noted that The Photographers' Gallery was also facing tough times during a recession, rising unemployment and a general downturn in the fortunes of art galleries;

"Across the river in Punt Rd., South Yarra, Bill Heimerman sits in a back room of his Photographers' Gallery. He has just mounted an exhibition from the Dutch surrealist photographer Paul De Nooijer but it remains in darkness five days a week because he says, he cannot afford the electricity bills. He says his phone had been disconnected and he is looking for a job as a night janitor or a checkout operator in a Seven-Eleven store so he can pay the rent and keep the place open."

The status and purpose of the Photographers' Gallery over its long tenure continued to evolve. Critic Beatrice Faust, a supporter of the gallery since its inception, in The Age in January 1990 observed;

"For several years now, Artist's Space has taken over the role established by the Photographers' Gallery; to provide a space for the exhibition of photographers' photographs–as distinct from the painterly kind."

Nevertheless, the Gallery was to survive for another twenty years.

== Closure ==
The gallery was closed in 2010 and was sold in 2015, and after a period of failing health, Bill Heimerman died on 1 October 2017. Ian Lobb died 1 October 2023.

== Legacy ==
In the 1970s, with the decline of the pictorial magazines and a consequent crisis in photojournalism and documentary photography, a revival of the pre-WW2 interest in photography as a fine art was a world-wide phenomenon, as it was in Australia. In 1972, Beatrice Faust, in reviewing Two Views of Erotica: Henry Talbot/Carol Jerrems at Brummels Gallery in Nation Review urged;

"There is no reason why photographs cannot be sold like prints, in numbered editions, and the trend to do this is worldwide. New York's Museum of Modern Art has had a section for photographic art for years, and a couple of these have found their way to Melbourne's National Gallery, which is the only one in Australia to have a department of photography.

The Photographers' Gallery and Workshop, because of its policy of sourcing and promoting established international work of a high standard, was well placed when percipient private collectors were entering the market in fine photographic prints, and major Australian institutions were initiating collections of photography.

The inaugural curator of the new photography department Jennie Boddington at the newly (1968) re-housed National Gallery of Victoria; Alison Carroll and Ian North of the Art Gallery of South Australia (which had begun to collect photography as a distinct discipline from the mid-1920s, its building expanded in 1962, refurbished 1979); and David Moore and Wes Stacey at the Australian Centre for Photography (est. 1973); all purchased from the Photographers' Gallery, with special interest in American and European works, along with the National Gallery of Australia, which though not built and opened until 1982, had started a photography collection in 1972. Its director James Mollison turned the sponsorship of the tobacco company Philip Morris International to the acquisition of Australian photography. These sales contributed significantly to the standing and survival of the Gallery, particularly in its early years of the 1970s and 1980s.

An archive of The Photographers' Gallery and Workshop is maintained by Heimerman's partner, Barbara Derrick.

== Exhibitions ==
- 2006, 24 November – 1 December: Tom Putt Photographic Workshops Annual Exhibition
- 2006, 21 October – 19 November: Rotation II
- 2005, 24 August – 9 September: Lynton Crabb, The Boy From PNG
- 2005: Defining the Fine Print
- 2004, 15 June – 2 July: Greg Sims, Up the Road
- 2004, 13–28 May: Najda Sue Macdermid, Karen Rawady, Gina Milicia, Jacquie Winder, Gaynor Manning. Presented as part of the Next Wave Festival
- 2004, January–February: Peter Leiss, War Fever: 50 Images of Urban America, 1992–1994
- 2003, 3–20 April: Neil Howe: Bodyscapes II
- 2003, 13–23 March: Serendipity
- 2002, 2–22 December: Derrick Lee and Ray Moles The Rainforest and Beyond
- 2002, 31 October – 1 December: Marilyn Monroe: Sixty images by Milton Green
- 2002, 10–27 October: Protection: combined works by Francesca Golotta and Maurizio Golotta
- 2002, July; Joel Meyerowitz: After 11 September: Images from Ground Zero
- 2002, 23 April – 12 May: Craig Roberts, Foundations
- 2002, 4–21 April: Rob Love, Water Sky and Flowers
- 2002, 7–24 March: David Tatnall, Himalaya
- 2002: The Salon Show
- 2001, 6–23 December: Works In Transition Artists: Steve Petrov, Diane Kitanowski, Roland Lawrence, Zoran Vasileveski, Robin Rosenfeldt
- 2001, 20 November – 2 December: Tulsi Jones, Gujarat: Stories from the Earthquake
- 2001: 19 July – 5 August: Robyn Rosenfeldt, Cuba
- 2001, 3–20 May: Konrad Winkler and Julie Goodwin: Baby Blues and Housewife Hues: Photographs and Drawings
- 2001, 7–31 March: Still Moments
- 2000 Neil Howe: Bodyscapes
- 2000, 12–29 October: The Nature of Things. Artists: Nigel Clements, Myer Bloom, Mick Sirianni, Gayle Slater, Gay Clarke, Kevin Birks, Stuart Murdoch, John Muller, Virginia Stobart, Chris Manteris, Gillian Martin, Gavin Liddle
- 2000, 28 September – 8 October: Jeremy Angerson presents Dreamasaurus. Photographers: Allison Adamson, Kata Bayer, Chris Beck, Eric Blaiche, Bournou Photography Designs, Andrew Chapman, Andy Dunbar, Josh Ellis, Rennie Ellis, John Gollings, Vanessa Hall, Grant Hancock, David Johns, Tard Johnston, Stuart Kerne, Ian Lawrence, Jason Lucas, Katherine Mandie, David Marks, Mercury Megaloudis, Ned Meldrum, Pru Miller, Gerard O'Conner, Lesley O'Donnell, James Pepino, Peter Rozetsky, Marco Sacchi, Jason South, Rod Stewart, Leanne Temme, Serge Thomann, Andy Vuksova, Dale Wright, Taek Yang, Yatzek, Jack Zarafian
- 2000, 14–24 September: Circles of Confusion: a photographic exhibition Artists: Evan Collins, John Muller, Chloe Holder, Livia Milazzo, Mirjana Josik, Hedy Ritterman, Virginia Stobart
- 2000, 3–20 August: Melissa McVeigh, Kashgar Market
- 2000, 13–30 July: Juan Carlos D'Abrera Syncytium
- 2000, 26 May – 11 June: Chelsea Anne Fitzgerald, Night Queens
- 2000, 12–29 April: Nathan Miller, Here, There and Everywhere
- 2000, 23 March – 9 April: Lisa Saad: Ex: the Exhibition
- 2000: 10–27 February: Millennium.com: Thirty Contemporary Australian Photographic Artists Point and Shoot at the New Millennium
- 1999, 4–21 November: Zoe Ali, Mozambique
- 1999, 24 September – 10 October: Ellie Young, For Lylee
- 1999 Stuart Murdoch: Sight Insight Site
- 1999, 12–29 August: Mary Fennessy, Julie Marchant, Suzanne Neale and Pamela Young, Transitions
- 1999, 22 July – 8 August: Nudes, incl. photographers Gordon Bunyan and Martin Barrie
- 1999, 10–27 June: Roxanne Oakley Scratching the Surface
- 1999, 20 May – 6 June: La Trobe University, Bendigo, Photography and Photojournalism. Irene Brereton, Jodie Clough, Jade Denton, Harry Palmer, Matthew Wickham, Ron Brown, Tom Campbell, Glenda Hooper, Name Salmon, Brad Wileman, Michael Harkin, Amanda Parker
- 1999, 29 April – 16 May: Gayle Slater, Continuum
- 1999, 8–25 April: Debra Pleuckhahn
- 1999, 18 March – 4 April: Andrea Paton, The Red Tent
- 1999, 25 February – 14 March: Synergy. Artists: Chris Lim, Deanna Ross, Susan Grdunac, Ellie Young, Bronwen Hyde, Marryanne Christodoulou, Kalli Karvelas, Berenger Marin Dubuard, Roxanne Oakley
- 1998, 1—20 December: Deanna Ross The Street is a Stage
- 1998, 12–29 November: Matthew Sleeth Roaring Days exhibition and book Launch
- 1998, 22 October – 8 November: Contemporary Australian Artists, The William Heimerman Collection. Artists: Amy Barker, Peter Barker, Robert Besanko, John Billan, Tiffany Bishop, Warren Brenninger, Marcus Bunyan, Francis Busby, Jeff Busby, Kerry Clark, Christine Cornish, Daniella Donate, Rennie Ellis, Greg Elms, Francesca Golotta, Fiona Hall, Kylie Hamill, William Heimerman, Bill Henson, Carol Jerrems, Christopher Koller, Peter Leiss, Jean Marc Lepechoux, Ian Lobb, Rosemary Mckeoun, Denise Moore, Paul Nadalin, Harry Nankin, Susan Purdy, Karen Rawady, Katherine Reeves, Kaye Rentil, Allison Ross, Mic Siranni, Gayle Slater, Anke Stacker, Virginia Stobart, Colin Vickery, Les Walkling, Konrad Winkler
- 1998, 1–19 October: G.A.S.: La Trobe University, Bendigo Media Arts students
- 1998, 17–27 September: Photographic Imaging Centre Annual Staff Exhibition.
- 1998, 20 August – 6 September: Second Series: Photographs by Konrad Winkler
- 1998: 30 July – 16 August: Three Suites: Colin Vickery, Susan Purdy, John Billan
- 1998: 13–29 July, the Gallery was closed for renovations
- 1998: 12, 1 July:00pm–5:00pm: Photographs by graduates of the 1998 M.33 Linden Documentary Workshop: The Blue Tak Show
- 1998, 28 May – 14 June: Carolyn Cliff, Natures
- 1998, 7–24 May: Virginia Stobart
- 1998, 20 April – 3 May: Marcus Bunyan, Kim Lawler, Andrew McLaughlin, Jane McLennan, Darkness/Colour
- 1998: 28 March – 16 April: Cassandra Tombs, 365
- 1998, February–1 March: Charmaine Hardy and Tanya Sarkies She's Lovely
- 1997, 27 November – 14 December: Denise Moore, Journey From Antiquity, Italy, 1997, A folio of Impressions
- 1997, 25 September – 13 October: Photographic Imaging College staff show
- 1997, 21 August – 7 September: Essence: Transcendental Works by Colin Vickery
- 1997, 31 July – 17 August: Kay Rintel, Flowerings
- 1997, 28 May – 15 June: Philip Quirk
- 1997, 29 May – 15 June, Kerry Clarke, Yemen: Images of the Middle East
- 1997 8–25 May, Konrad Winkler, Family and Friends
- 1997, 17 April – 4 May, Peter Leiss, Prague: Identification by Blood
- 1997, 27 March – 13 April, John Cato Retrospective
- 1997, 6–23 March Konfir Kabo, Ordinary Dreams
- 1996, 28 November – 15 December: Stuart Murdoch: ...as a log book stands to a journey
- 1996, 7–24 November: 20th Anniversary Exhibition Ralph Gibson, Ian Lobb, Marcus Bunyan, Harry Callahan, Christopher Koller, Aaron Siskind, Gayle Slater, Paul Caponigro, Francis Busby, Hans Namuth, Les Walkling, Lisette Model, Greg Elms, Larry Clark, Kylie Hamill, Wyn Bullock, Rosemary McKeoun, William Clift, Jeff Busby, Duane Michals, Rennie Ellis, Karen Rawady, Edouard Boubat, Carol Jerrems, Eikoh Hosoe, John Cato, Peter Leiss, William Eggleston, Robert Besanko, Paul Nadalin, John Divola, Colin Vickery, Eliot Porter, Warren Brenninger, Emmet Gowin, Bill Henson.
- 1996, 5–22 September, Marcus Bunyan, All Natural Fibres
- 1996, 2–19 September: The Big Picture: a photographic exhibition by the staff of Photographic Imaging College. Artists; Daniel Bacon, Peter Barker, Kevin Birks, Myer Bloom, Gay Clarke, Nigel Dements, Chris Manteris, Stuart Murdoch, Mick Siranni, Gayle Slater
- 1996, 15 August – 1 September: Salon '96: a collection of photographers showing trends from the 70s, 80s and 90s
- 1996, 25 July – 11 August, Allison Ross, The Union of Psyche and Eros
- 1996, 4–21 July, Photographs by David Showler and Glenn Sloggett, co-curator: Louisa Ragas.
- 1996, 23 May – 9 June, Maxienne Young, Experiences in Time
- 1996, 9–19 May, Moses Tan, Journey to Jerusalem
- 1996, 11–28 April, Lyn Pool, Bloom
- 1996, 21 March – 7 April, Colin Vickery: Presence
- 1996, 29 February – 17 March, Rennie Ellis: Further Observations
- 1996, 8–28 February: Marion E. Hill, Bearing the breast: photographic images of breast cancer* 1996, 8–25 February, Marion Hill
- 1995, 30 November – 17 December: Glenn Guy, Ancient Images
- 1995, 2–12 November: Kylie Hamill, Into the Looking Glass
- 1995, 8–22 October: The public Bar: Three photographers' documentation of the public bar in North Melbourne
- 1995, 7 September – 1 October; Jeff Busby
- 1995, 17 August – 3 September: Harry Nankin: Acts of Ritual
- 1995, 20 July – 6 August: Francis Busby
- 1995, 29 June – 16 July: Sandra Taylor, Labyrinth
- 1995, 8–25 June : Kathryn Reeves Reeves 95
- 1995, 18 May – 4 June: Daniela Donati, Restoration
- 1995, 27 April – 14 May: A Collector's Choice
- 1995, 30 March – 23 April: Peter Leiss
- 1994, 27 October – 13 November: Marcus Bunyan, Inevolution
- 1994, 7–24 July: Michael Goldsmith 6,7,8,
- 1994, 21 April – 8 May: Francesca Golotta, In Bocca Al Lupo: In Good Faith
- 1994, 31 March – 17 April: Paul Nadalin Platinum Prints
- 1994: The Collection
- 1993 Greg Wayn, In Industrial Light
- 1993, 21 October – 28 November: Christopher Groenhout
- 1993, 7–17 October, Marcus Bunyan: The naked man fears no pickpockets.
- 1993, August: Brighton Bay graduate exhibition, Separate Distractions Pt.1
- 1992, 4–19 December: Peter Leiss, The Romper Stomper Series
- 1992: First year photography, RMIT Bundoora, Points Of Departure
- 1991, 27 September – 6 October: Myopia: The Photographic Imaging Centre's Staff Exhibition Artists; Peter Barker, Kevin Birks, Myer Bloom, Gay Clarke, Werner Hammerstingl, Carolyn Deutsher, Chris Manteris, Stuart Murdoch, Mick Siranni, Gayle Slater
- 1991, 16 May – 9 June: John Werrett
- 1990: Next Wave Festival show
- 1989, November: Unconscious Collective: works by graduates of Melbourne University Institute of Education
- 1989, 20 July – 27 August: Jacqueline Mitelman, Jeff Busby, Greg Elms, Peter Leiss, Resurgence
- 1989, 25 May – 24 June: Benefit Exhibition
- 1988, December: Peter Leiss, Regression
- 1988, 11–19 November: Dean Petti, Landscapes of the Lancefield Region
- 1988 Rod McNicol
- 1987, 5–15 November: M.C.A.E Final Year Photography Students Peter McDougall, Celina Loren-Rymaszewska, Barbara Syme, Rosemary Connors, Marina Grubelich, Parallax
- 1987 Warren Breninger
- 1987, 13 September – 4 October: Beatrice Faust Curates: Boubat to Fereday
- 1987, 9 July – 1 August: Francis Busby
- 1986, 31 July – 24 August: Nicholas Nixon
- 1986, 3–27 July, An Australian group show Brian Windridge, Viva Gibb, Virginia Fraser, Fiona Hall
- 1986, 5–29 June: Reece Vogel
- 1986, 1–25 May: John Gollings
- 1986, 3–27 April: Emmet Gowin
- 1986, 7–28 February: Three Views, Grant Matthews, Paul Murphy, Paul Torcello
- 1984, 28 November – 16 December: Christopher Köller, Zen Zen Chigau
- 1984, 13 October – 4 November: Jeff Busby, Dance Photographs
- 1984, 10 May – 3 June: Jeff Busby, Photographs
- 1984, April: Francis Busby* 1984 Tim Handfield: Australian Colour Photographs
- 1983 Warren Breninger There is No Escape 1971–1983
- 1983, 15 September – 16 October: Ian Lobb, Photographs 1979-1983
- 1983, July; David Blount
- 1983, 24 March – 24 April: Steven Lojewski, Sydney Photographs 1981–1983
- 1983: Peter Leiss, Metropolis
- 1982, 15 October – 7 November: Tony Perry
- 1982, 17 September – 9 October: Tim Handfield
- 1982, 6–29 August: Jeff Busby
- 1982, to 23 May: Les Walkling
- 1982, 12 March – 13 April: Hans Namuth, Jackson Pollock
- 1981, to 13 December: Paul De Nooijer
- 1981, 25 September – 1 November: August Sander
- 1981, 24 July – 13 September: Duane Michals
- 1981, July: Lin Bender
- 1981, 16 April – 13 May: American Photographers: Lisette Model, William Eggleston, Ralph Gibson, Larry Clark
- 1981, 5–29 March: Christopher Köller
- 1980, 28 November – 14 December: Don Sharpe, Vietnam Revisited
- 1980, 31 October – 23 November: Graham Howe
- 1980, 15 October – 7 November: Tony Perry
- 1980, August: Lisette Model
- 1980 John Divola
- 1980, 10 July – 8 August: Tim Handfield, Colour Photographs
- 1980, 6 June – 6 July: Lee Friedlander
- 1980, 25 April – 25 May: John Divola, Zuma
- 1980, 21 March – 20 April: Édouard Boubat
- 1980, 7 February – 8 March: Tony Perry
- 1979 Greg Wayn
- 1979, 16 November – 16 December: Eikoh Hosoe, Ordeal by Roses
- 1979, 12 October – 11 November: Ian Lobb
- 1979, September–October: Larry Clark
- 1979, August: William Eggleston
- 1979 Tim Handfield: Recent Work
- 1979, 25 May – 24 June: Benefit Exhibition. Photographers: Greg Wayn, Brett Weston, Les Walkling, Paul Caponigro, Edna Bullock, Wynn Bullock, Aaron Siskind, John Cato, Ralph Gibson, Robert Besanko, Boone Morrison.
- 1979, 13 April – 20 May: Franco Fontana
- 1979, 9 March – 8 April: Paul Caponigro
- 1979, 8 February – 4 March: Nigel Clark
- 1978, 16 November – 17 December: Jerry Uelsmann
- 1978, 19 October – 12 November: Robert Cumming
- 1978, 21 September – 15 October: Les Walkling
- 1978, 17 August – 17 September: Harry Callahan
- 1978, 20 July – 13 August: New Australian Work. Artists: Gerard Groenveld, Bill Henson, Vivienne Hale, David Ellis, Fiona Hall, Ian Cerchi, Stephen Roach, Penny Malone, Peter Charuk, John Adair, Rod McNicol, Jon Macmichael, Christine Cornish, Frank Busby, Greg Wayn, Rod Trinca, Paul Krieg, Geoff Strong, Wayne Fimeri, Sandy Edwards
- 1978, 15 June – 16 July: Ralph Gibson: Colour Work
- 1978, 18 May – 11 June: Four Australian Women: Carol Jerrems, Christine Godden, Christine Cornish and Jenny Aitken
- 1978, 13 April – 14 May: Emmet Gowin
- 1978, 9 March – 9 April: Eliot Porter
- 1978, 2 February – 6 March: Robert Besanko
- 1978 Carol Jerrems
- 1978 Christine Godden
- 1977, 17 November – 12 December: Aaron Siskind
- 1977, 20 October – 13 November: Oliver Gagliani
- 1977, 22 September – 16 October: William Clift
- 1977, 25 August – 18 September John Cato
- 1977, 29 July – 22 August: Ralph Gibson
- 1977, 1–25 July: Boone Morrison
- 1977, June: Paul Hill
- 1977 Wynn Bullock (1977),
- 1976, 2 September—10 October: Steven Lojewski Slender is the Thread
- 1976, August: Paul Caponigro
- 1976/7, December–January Rennie Ellis and Carol Jerrems: Heroes and Anti-Heroes
- 1976, November: Brett Weston
- 1976 Marion Hardman
- 1976: Jon Rhodes and Peter Leiss, Images of India
- 1975 Carol Jerrems

=== The Gallery under the management of Cox, Williams, McNicol and Tyssen held exhibitions including ===
- 1975, March: Human Still Lives, Paul Cox
- 1973, October: Gerard Groeneveld

Other solo or group exhibitions at the Gallery presented photographers Paul Hopper and Ingeborg Tyssen. In 1982 The Photographers' Gallery presented Aaron Siskind at Reconnaissance in Fitzroy in a joint venture.
