= Light Vision =

Australian bi-monthly photography periodical 1977-78

Light Vision was a bi-monthly Australian photography magazine that existed between 1977 and 1978.

== Foundation and duration ==
Light Vision magazine, subtitled "Australia’s international photography magazine", was launched in September 1977, and though it lasted only eight issues, it made a more lasting impression on Australian photography than previous periodicals. In its first editorial, the magazine proclaims its purpose to become the "publishing outlet, key to large exposure, in this country reaching the level of quality which could trigger the international recognition that we need and deserve."

== Personnel ==
Jean-Marc Le Pechoux (born 1953), who had studied at Stage Experimental Photographique and who, from 1971 to 1974, was a freelance photographer in Paris, came to Australia and taught at Prahran College of Advanced Education and Photography Studies College in Melbourne from 1974 to 1976. Deciding to make the southern city his home, he recognised the need for a high quality magazine. He taught himself the trade of editor/publisher and set up Light Quest Publications in the front room of his home at 75 Wilson Street, South Yarra.

Le Pechoux and Kalli Pulos produced the magazine and were responsible for its design and masthead. Pulos was credited as editorial assistant and also served as publisher. The magazine had up to four paid casual staff, along with correspondents and advisers in Australia and overseas. Listed personnel included Associate Editor and Sydney Editor Steven Lojewski, Art Directors David Lancashire and, from issue 2, Lin Bender, Los Angeles correspondent Graham Howe, Paris correspondent Dominique Anginot, Adelaide correspondent Ed Douglas, Perth correspondent Miles Glanville, and Hobart correspondent Geoff Parr.

== The magazine ==
In his first editorial Jean-Marc Le Pechoux surveyed the emergent, positive situation for photography in Australia;

A large international corporation [Philip Morris International] has recently compiled a collection of works by Australian photographers. In Melbourne alone during the last few months the public could have seen the works of J. M. Cameron, E. J. Bellocq, Jan Saudek, Lee Freidlander, Ralph Gibson or John Cato. National Galleries are collecting photographs. Colleges, public and private art schools and workshops provide varied avenues for the study of photography and many bookshops are importing and retailing fine books on the medium. A national conference on photography will be held in Sydney this month and finally, in Melbourne, the first dealer gallery of international standing to open doors in this country was inaugurated last month.

Identified by photojournalist Geoff Strong as “that haute couture of Australian photographic magazines”, Light Vision was glossily printed by Norman J. Field & Co Pty Ltd in Richmond, reproducing photographers' prints full page, and tackling photographic theory in essays, and in reviews of such contemporary texts as Susan Sontag's On Photography (1977). However, as a result of the cost of such support for the local printing industry, its cover price was the cover price was $2.70 which was at the high end of affordability at the time ($A15-$20 equivalent in 2019). The double issue 6&7 was $5. Annual subscriptions within Australia were $15.00 for the six issues, with postage, Air Mail to New Zealand was $A28.00 and to other countries $A34.00. Surface mail to all countries was $A19.00.

== Content ==
The magazine honoured its title Australia's international photography magazine with representations of American or European photography alongside Australian examples in most issues. More established photographers in their late thirties to late sixties dominated until the double number 6&7 of 1978 devoted to new Australian work. That featured 21 artists born around 1950 and with an average age of 26; the youngest, John Adair, being eighteen and the oldest, John Cerchi, thirty-four. Many, Fiona Hall, Sandy Edwards, Bill Henson amongst them, went on to important careers. Selectors were American William Clift; Christine Godden Director and Michael Snelling Administrator, of the Australian Centre for Photography; William Heimerman and Ian Lobb, directors of The Photographers' Gallery and Workshop; and Jean-Marc Le Pechoux and Steven Lojewski for Light Vision. The magazine worked in partnership with its near neighbour 1.5 km across South Yarra, The Photographers' Gallery, who mounted an exhibition New Australian Work with the selected imagery, which toured.

Book reviews, located in its off-white matt pages fore and aft, did not start to feature until issue 3, when the magazine appraised Craft Australia and Theatre Australia in a report on its joining an association of 'smaller magazines'. Artist and photography lecturer Tony Perry, in the 4th number, reviewed the American publications On Photography by Susan Sontag; Garry Winogrand's Women Are Beautiful; Sex Objects: An American Documentary by photographer Eric Kroll (misspelt 'Knoll' throughout the review); and Les Krims' Fictcryptokrimsographs, while devoting a scant paragraph to Kelly Wise's Still Points (rendered 'Stillpoints' in the review). In the next issue Robert Rooney joined Perry to compare Helmut Newton's White Women with Edward Weston Nudes and included a European with Herbert List Photographen (sic) 1930-1970, and photodocumentary in Americans Mark and Dan Jury's Gramp.

In the penultimate issue, in which three women photographers' books are considered, the pair are negative on Norman Sanders' At Home and in reviewing, for the first and only time an Australian volume, Timeless Gardens by Eleanor Williams and Wes Stacey, while reserving praise for Arnold Gassan's fourth edition of Handbook for Contemporary Photography, and the coffee table glossy Album Cover Album: The book of Record Cover Jackets, Maureen Lambray's The American Film Directors, and Barbara Blondeau 1938-1974. They finish with strong commendations for the Swiss photography journal Print Letter, while criticising Camera for its recent concentration on American photography, though Perry himself, in the last edition of Light Vision, topically covers exclusively American books of work by Lewis Hine, Robert Adams, William Eggleston, Lewis Baltz and others dealing with urban and rural landscape and the 'New Topographics'.

Unlike its treatment of books, on the numbers Light Vision was more equitable in inclusion of Australian photographers in its presentation of multiple-page 'folios' of individual photographers' work, even without taking into the calculation the 'Special Australian Edition'. Though there is no women's work presented in portfolios, the glossy colour printing as faithfully reproduces, effectively in tri-tone, the monochrome antipodean imagery of John Cato, Paul Cox, Phillip Quirk, Graham Howe and John Williams, the warmth of Robert Besanko's Kodalith paper, and Max Dupain's toned prints of the 1930s, as it does American Christian Vogt's saturated SX-70 and 8"x10" Polaroids. A full page is usually devoted to each image, with generous white borders allowing decent presentation of both landscape- and portrait-oriented images.

Critical and art-historical writing was building strength before the demise of Light Vision, with extended contributions from significant authorities, Australian and international, of both genders; Beatrice Faust, Peter Turner, Gael Newton, Memory Holloway and in the last issue, Max Kozloff.

Contents:
Issue #	Date	Page	Author/Photographer	Item
1	September–October, 1977	Cover	John Cato	Untitled 3
		4	Peter Turner	Ralph Gibson interview
		5	Ralph Gibson	Images from Days at Sea
		10	Rennie Ellis	On looking at photographs
		12	John Cato	Proteus
		21	Athol Shmith	John Cato
		22	Dominique Anginot	Arles
		24	Philip Quirk	From Kipling to the Letter
		30	Review	Two photographic schools
		32	Calendar	Exhibitions and Education
2	November–December, 1977	Cover	William Clift	Old St. Louis Courthouse, Missouri
		3	Beatrice Faust	No more paper
		4	Peter Turner	On Quality
		12	George Hampel	Court room reflections
		13	William Clift	Court-house series
		22	John Riches	The Print
		24	Paul Cox	Interview and Photographs
		30	Deborah Guyon	Sydney, a conference
		32	Calendar	Exhibitions and Education
3	January–February, 1978	Cover	Robert Besanko	1975, untitled
		3	Reviews	MAG News
		4	Robert Besanko	Folio
		13	Peter Burch	Photography Auction
		14	Peter Perry	Onto the curator's desk
		19	Graham Howe	Sneaker in the Sky
		30	Calendar	Exhibitions and Education
		31	Announcement	Singular Visions
4	March–April, 1978	Cover	Christian Vogt	8x10 Polacolor 2
		4	John Williams	Folio
		13	Bob Pile	Redefining the photo essay
		18	Tony Perry	Book Reviews
		20	Eelco Wolf	Christian Vogt
		21	Christian Vogt	Folio
		30	Information	News
		31	Calendar	Exhibitions
		31	Letters	Readers
5	May–June	Cover	Max Dupain	The Sunbaker, 1937
		4	Mark Hindraker	Beaumont Newhall
		6	Max Dupain	Portfolio
		25	Gael Newton	Max Dupain
		28	Tony Perry and Robert Rooney	Book Reviews
		30	Information	News
		32	Letters	Readers
6 & 7	July–October 1978: Special Australian Edition	Cover	Ian Cerchi	untitled
		4	Memory Holloway	Introduction
		7	Photographers	Biographies
		9	Photographers	Plates
		50	Tony Perry and Robert Rooney	Book reviews
		52	Information	Directory
8	November–December, 1978	Cover	Bruno Requillart	Versailles, 1978
		4	Robbert Flick	Midwest and Inglewood
		13	Max Kozloff	A Problem of Photographic Perception
		16	Tony Perry	Books
		18	Suzanne Hampel	Venice Biennale 1978
		20	Bruno Requillart	Versailles
		29	Information	News

== Demise ==
The expensive cover price required to cover Light Vision's high quality of production, the new and relatively limited audience for art photography in Australia, compounded by its removal after issue 4 from the stock of the bookshop of a major public gallery, on the basis of the appearance of pubic hair in a controversial image by Christian Vogt in issue 4, all contributed to the magazine's premature demise. Though not announced in its pages, Issue 8 was to be the last.

== Influence ==
During Creative Camera editor Peter Turner’s visit to Australia in 1977 he met Jean-Marc Le Pechoux and significantly, Max Dupain’s The Sunbaker was featured on the covers of both Light Vision and Creative Camera in 1978, with Dupain himself contributing an essay in Light Vision issue 5. Such exposure, and that of the young Bill Henson in two issues raised the profile of Australian photography in the UK. The magazine played a role in setting Australian photography and photographers in an international context and in publicising their work overseas in a quality publication.
