= Caponigro =

Caponigro is an Italian surname. Notable people with the surname include:

- Antonio Caponigro (1912–1980), American mobster
- Jeff Caponigro, American public relations executive
- John Paul Caponigro (born 1965), American photographer
- Paul Caponigro (born 1932), American photographer
