= Conservation-restoration of dye diffusion transfer prints =

The conservation-restoration of dye diffusion transfer prints is the process undertaken by conservator-restorers of caring for and maintaining dye diffusion transfer prints to preserve their form, and the information they contain. It covers the processes that can be taken by conservators, archivists, and other museum professionals. This practice includes understanding the composition and agents of deterioration of dye diffusion transfer prints, as well as the preventive conservation and interventive conservation measures that can be taken.

== History of dye diffusion transfer prints ==
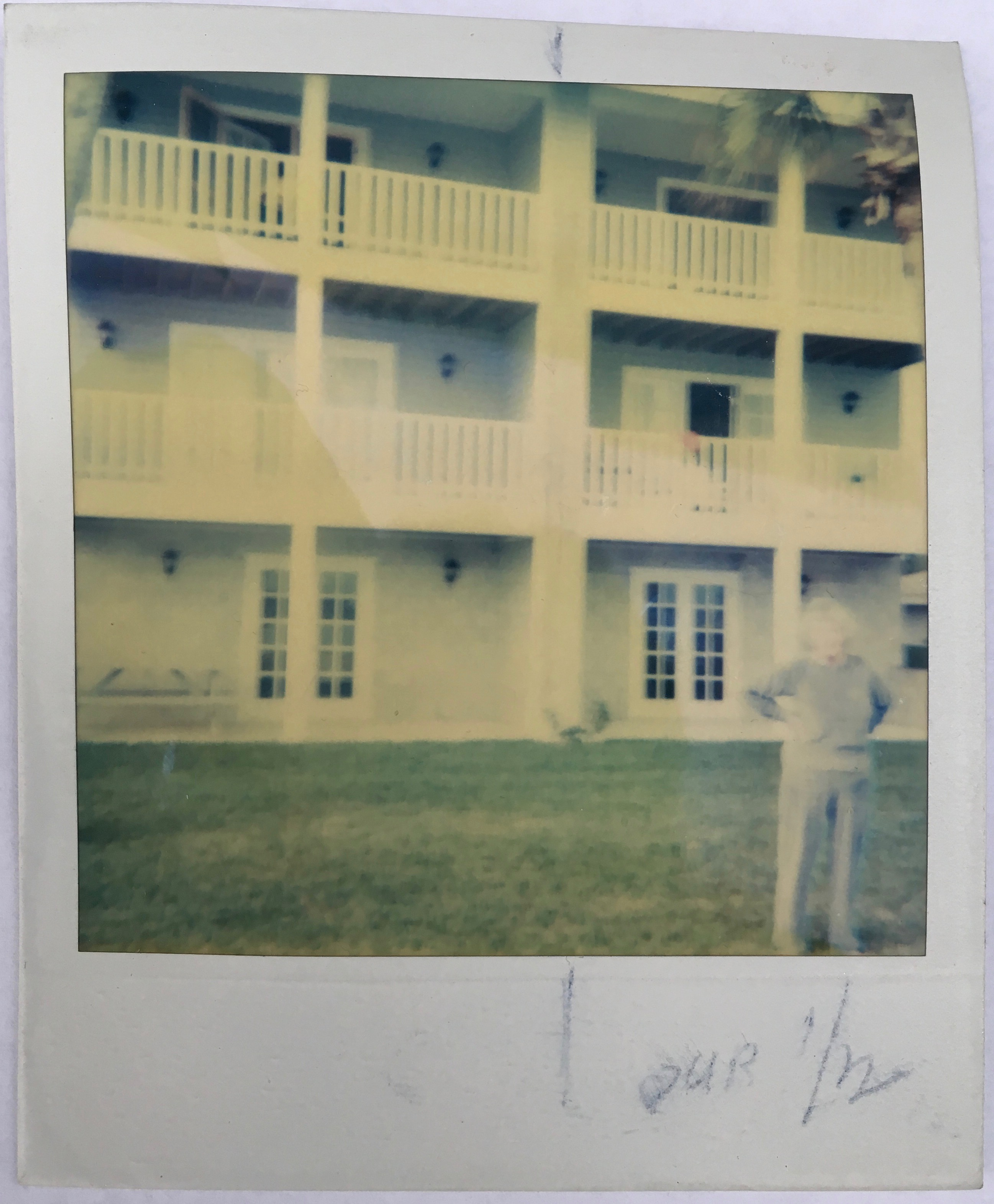
Charlotte Frenett in Jupiter, Florida

Dye diffusion transfer prints are photographs made through a process where film containing chemical reagents is developed by an instant camera specifically designed for that purpose. The practice that created dye diffusion transfer prints was first introduced by Edwin H. Land in 1947, who called the technique the Polaroid-Land process. These initial prints were made in sepia tone, and as chemistry progressed, true black and white prints were launched by 1950, and color prints followed in 1963. Sometimes, dye diffusion transfer prints are referred to as instant film due to their quick processing, or by the brand name Polaroid as this was the company to first introduce the technology to the public. Kodak launched their own version in 1976, and Fujifilm in 1981. Dye diffusion transfer prints are useful in private and professional spheres, as well as in places they intersect. This value can be understood by considering the ways in which they are woven throughout modern civilization. For example, they can function as a way to document everyday life, provide critical up-to-the minute medical or investigatory data, or may be used as a form of art. Professionals such as Ansel Adams and Marie Cosindas were early adaptors of the artform, even partnering with camera manufacturers to have their own equipment tailor-made to their needs.

== Conservation-restoration ==
Conservation-restoration of cultural heritage is a field in which trained professionals work in managing the long-term care of artifacts for the purpose of obtaining knowledge for current and for future generations. This work includes negotiating the best practices of preventive-conservation in collections care and determining when and what type of treatments might be required, if necessary. In some circumstances, conservator-restorers may take a unique avenue to improve images of dye diffusion transfer prints in poor condition: using digital technology. Even this method is not a foolproof technique, as some prints, notably those made from film available at the end of the 1970s, experienced deterioration nearly immediately, and the ability to care for them can only go so far.

== Preventive conservation ==
Preventive conservation is a dimension of conservation-restoration that accounts for the need to prevent or mitigate artifacts from incurring damage. In short, the practice recognizes the point made by Philip Ward that: "deterioration is not inevitable...Deterioration is reduced by controlling its causes." Current best practices in this paradigm involve considering how to avoid the agents of deterioration, initially identified by Charlie Costain in 1994, as a list of key threats to artifacts. While some of these agents pose more of a concern to dye diffusion transfer prints than others, they are all potentially problematic towards them and must be considered.

=== Agents of deterioration ===
The agents of deterioration are ten key factors that are identified to contribute to the risks faced by artifacts. While just one of these dynamics could cause irreversible damage, improper conditions or events could cause more than one of them to occur in tandem, effectively multiplying problems.

Dissociation

Dye diffusion transfer prints are objects vulnerable to dissociation, or the way in which the items themselves or data associated with them may be lost. Due to their relatively small size, approximately 10.75 x 0.1 x 8.85 cm, they may be fall into crevices, or become otherwise misplaced.

Fire

Fire is a potentially great risk for dye diffusion transfer prints in that it can either directly cause their complete destruction via burning or melting, or it may yield indirect damage through smoke exposure. Means of extinguishing nearby fires may cause water or chemical damage as well.

Incorrect relative humidity

Incorrect relative humidity or fluctuations in humidity can be a problem for dye diffusion transfer prints. Problems can include expansions of different layers of the film, as well as deterioration of colors.

Incorrect temperature

The issue of temperature being too high, too low, or simply fluctuating can cause problems for dye diffusion transfer prints. Incorrect temperature alone can cause cracking, yellowing, or distortion, but also correlate with flammability and humidity problems.

Ultraviolet and infrared light

Radiation including visible, ultraviolet, and infrared light can affect dye diffusion transfer prints. Visible light is one of the most significant threats among the Agents of Deterioration for dye diffusion transfer prints, and can fade colors, a problem that cannot be reversed through conservation-restoration. Ultraviolet light can cause materials to weaken, and infrared can raise temperature, which in addition to the problems outlined above can magnify the damage by visible and ultraviolet light.

Pests

From microorganisms to rodents, pests pose a threat to dye diffusion transfer prints. Not only can they create cavities within the prints, they can leave byproducts on the materials leading to erosion.

Physical forces

Physical forces are largely caused when there is impact between objects. In the case of dye diffusion transfer prints, threats include cracking, chipping, abrasion, or structural failure, such as ripping.

Pollutants

Pollutants can affect dye diffusion transfer prints both from external sources and through the breakdown of internal structures. Whether the agent is airborne, transferred by contact, or is intrinsic, damages can include erosion, deposits, or discoloration.

Thieves and vandals

Thieves and vandals can cause both dissociation and damage. Outright theft of dye diffusion transfer prints can at worst be a total loss for the artifact as a relic of cultural heritage or at best, simply a lapse in collections care before it is recovered. Vandalization can include the problems identified by physical forces and may include more than one dimension of problems.

Water

Water, which can be a physical or chemical force, can bring about softening, swelling, staining, or physical forces to dye diffusion transfer prints. The impact of water damage can range from minimal to significant, such as in the formation of condensation or when the artifacts may be completely submerged in water. Many conditions can amplify damage, such as heat or time of exposure.

=== Storage ===
One of the most important ways to help artifacts of all kinds is to consider their storage both when they are being used and when they are packed away. Researchers Dusan Stulik and Art Kaplan acknowledge: "without knowing the chemical nature and physical structure of a photograph, it is difficult to prescribe conditions for its storage or exhibition that will help ensure its preservation, and it is difficult as well to determine appropriate conservation treatment". However, certain best practices emerge within the conservation-restoration field to provide a blueprint. Acid-free boxes are a commonly recommended source for the storage of dye diffusion transfer prints. In addition, containers of polyester, aluminum, or glass may also provide adequate housing. Individual prints should be stored separately in sleeves or envelopes that are made of polypropylene or paper with high quantities of alphacellulose. In the unfortunate circumstance that prints must be stored together, they should be stored vertically to avoid warping or bending. It is critical that prints be completely dry prior to storage. Best practices indicate that storage conditions remain about 70 °F (21 °C), and the relative humidity be kept between 30% and 50%.

== Treatment ==
If dye diffusion transfer prints are not cared for though the tenets of preventive conservation, they may need to receive treatment. Generally, any work associated with physically altering a print would be the domain of a conservator-restorer. Treatment for dye diffusion transfer prints can range from directly contacting them, such as in repairing a crack or tear, separating them from materials that may adhere to them, including other prints, cleaning their surface, to establishing a protocol for storage as discussed above. Typically, the use of nitrile gloves to protect both the print and the person working to treat it would apply in this work.

=== Repair ===
==== Cracking ====
One commonly occurring threat to dye diffusion transfer prints is cracking. Among the techniques that trained conservator-restorers may employ to mend them is filling the crack. One technique entails supporting the crack with Japanese paper, applying gelatin in careful phases, humidifying the object, and then flattening the print in a heated press.

==== Water damage ====
Another threat to dye diffusion transfer prints is water damage. Water damage is known to erode the surface of prints, and within two days, it may also encourage the conditions for mold growth. If the water damage is suspected, and the surface of a print is sticky to contact, then it should not be handled. However, if the surface appears intact, then the print may be rinsed in cool, clean water and then set aside to dry.

=== Cleaning ===
Sometimes, dye diffusion transfer prints may require cleaning. In certain cases, this work would need to be supervised or completed by a professional conservator-restorer, but in other cases an untrained individual may be able to do the work. Attempts to clean a damaged print could lead to the surface material peeling away, and laypersons should be advised to consult advice before attempting such work on their own. In the circumstance that a print is in good condition, simple cleaning strategies may be employed to care for its condition. If the print is dry, any dirt may be carefully brushed off. If the print is wet, then it may be briefly submerged in a room temperature water bath (68°-86 °F or 20°-30 °C), to wash away any debris. After an initial wash in this technique, prints may be rinsed, and be set out on a flat, dry surface where dust cannot settle on the surface.

== Case studies ==
=== Iain Baxter& ===
Canadian conceptual artist Iain Baxter& uses dye diffusion transfer prints as a medium of his art. His partnership with the Art Gallery of Ontario during a 2012 exhibition of his work exemplifies a mutual understanding of the need for conservation of dye diffusion transfer prints by himself and gallery conservator Katy Whitman.

=== Andy Warhol ===
American pop artist Andy Warhol often used dye diffusion transfer prints in his art. When prints from 1974 to 1983 were on exhibit at the Harry Ransom Center in 2016, conservators had to account for the presence of humidity and physical pressure to ensure that they were protected.
