= Caponegro =

Caponegro is an Italian surname. Notable people with the surname include:

- Selen (actress) (born Luce Caponegro in 1966), Italian actress and TV presenter
- Mary Caponegro (born 1956), American experimental fiction writer

== See also ==
- Caponigro
