= Scacco Matto =

Studio album by Lorenzo Senni
- Released: April 24, 2020
- Length: 41:27
- Label: Warp
- Producer: Lorenzo Senni

Lorenzo Senni chronology
Superimpositions (2014)	Scacco Matto (2020)

Singles from Mordechai
- 1. "Discipline of Enthusiasm" Released: March 3, 2020; 2. "Canone infinito" Released: April 1, 2020; 3. "THINK BIG" Released: April 18, 2020

Scacco Matto ("Checkmate" in Italian) is the third studio album by Italian musician Lorenzo Senni. It was released April 24, 2020 under Warp.

== Critical reception ==
Professional ratings
Aggregate scores
Source	Rating
Metacritic	80/100
Review scores
Source	Rating
AllMusic	4/5 stars
The Guardian	4/5 stars
musicOMH	4/5 stars
Pitchfork	7.6/10

Scacco Matto was met with widespread acclaim reviews from critics. Ross Horton of musicOMH reviewed "Scacco Matto offers the listener an exhausting, exhaustive journey through a kaleidoscopic, hyper-saturated mind." Chal Ravens of Pitchfork said "The rules are fixed but the outcome is unpredictable; within extremely narrow parameters, players can display flair, cunning, and subterfuge."

== Cover artwork ==
The cover artwork is a photograph by John Divola called "Zuma #30".

== Track listing ==
Scacco Matto track listing
No.	Title	Length
1.	"Discipline of Enthusiasm"	4:37
2.	"XBreakingEdgeX"	3:40
3.	"Move in Silence (Only Speak When It’s Time to Say Checkmate)"	3:15
4.	"Canone Infinito"	4:59
5.	"Dance Tonight Revolution Tomorrow"	7:32
6.	"The Power of Failing"	5:49
7.	"Wasting Time Writing Lorenzo Senni Songs"	5:28
8.	"THINK BIG"	6:07
Total length:		41:30

Japanese bonus tracks
No.	Title	Length
9.	"Win in The Flat World"	4:55
10.	"The Shape of Trance to Come"	6:10
Total length:		52:05
