= William Clift (photographer) =

American photographer (born 1944)

William Clift (born 1944, Boston, MA) is an American photographer known for his black-and-white imagery of landscapes and of architectural subjects. Most of his work has been made in New Mexico, including Santa Fe where he has lived and worked since 1971, and of Mont Saint Michel in France, and St. Louis, MO.

== Early life ==
Clift was born in Boston in 1944; his uncle was the actor Montgomery Clift. Attending Dexter School, Brookline, MA, Clift took up photography when he was ten years old using a Polaroid camera, then to buy his own camera, a bakelite Kodak Brownie 'Hawkeye', and to equip his first darkroom, he spent summers caddying and finding golf balls and taking Coke bottles to recycle. He attended Browne and Nichols High School Cambridge 1957-61. He did no formal training in photography and spent only one year at Columbia University.

With Willem Nyland, Clift studied the Greek-Armenian mystic philosopher George Gurdjieff.

== Photographer ==
Clift's first instruction in photography was a workshop with Paul Caponigro in 1959, when he was fifteen. He studied at Columbia University, N.Y. in 1962. He has worked professionally since 1963, for six years (to 1971) operating under the business name Helios with Steve Gersh as his business partner in Cambridge, specialising in architectural photography. He was a charter member of the Association of Heliographers (1963–65) with Carl Chiarenza, Walter Chappell, Paul Caponigro, Nicholas Dean, Paul Petricone, and Marie Cosindas. Since then, two of his books (2007 and 2012) were designed by Eleanor Caponigro. His early projects included a commission for a 1970 series from the Massachusetts Council on the Arts to document the old Boston City Hall, the Hudson River Valley, and courthouses around the country.

Clift married Vida Chesnulis in 1971 and they and daughter Charis moved to Santa Fe that same year. There, he worked freelance and produced his first portfolio with 108 original prints, limited to 12 copies. The next year he was granted a National Endowment for the Arts Photographers Fellowship and in 1974, the year his second daughter Carola was born, a Guggenheim Fellowship. From 1975-76 he undertook a project to photograph Beacon Hill in Boston, and worked extensively on Joseph Seagram's Bicentennial Project "Court House".

After 10 years at Harvard Vida taught at St. John's while Clift began documenting the landscape of the region, including La Bajada, Canyon de Chelly, and Shiprock. Traveling to Australia in 1978, he taught workshops in fine printing at Photographers' Gallery & Workshop. Back in the USA he worked on a project called "American Images" funded by A.T. & T. which supported 20 American photographers, each to make 15 new photographs. That year, 1978, his first son, William, was born.

In 1977 to 1984 he made portraits of American artist Georgia O'Keeffe and her assistant Juan Hamilton and also in 1984 returned to using the Polaroid camera in making portraits of his daughter for A Particular World.

A 1979 National Endowment for the Arts supported the publishing of "Court House", a portfolio of 6 prints, limited to 60 copies plus 5 artist's proofs, and in 1980 he was awarded a further Guggenheim Fellowship. On a 1981-2 trip to France he made photographs of Mont-St. Michel, which were paired in a portfolio, printed over 1983, with the Shipwreck imagery.

Members of the Clift family were the subject of an exhibit at the Museum of the Southwest in Midland, TX, titled, "A Particular World: The Clift Family of Artist" from May 12-August 7, 2022. The exhibition features the work of photographer William Clift, from his earliest Polaroids to his grand landscapes to his most recent iPhone photos, but also the work of his son, the sculptor Will Clift, and his daughter, visual artist Carola Clift. The more private creations of daughter Charis and wife Vida are included as examples of how art can permeate one's daily life.

Clift lives in La Tierra and his studio-cum- gallery is at 203 E. Palace Ave. in the Sierra Vista-Hickox neighbourhood.

== Awards ==
Clift is the recipient of two Guggenheim fellowships, two National Endowment for the Arts grants, and a Governor's Award for the Arts.

== Exhibitions ==
- 1963 (solo) Café Florian. Boston (USA)
- 1964 (solo) Gallery Archive of Heliography. New York (USA)
- 1969 (solo) Carl Siembab Gallery, Boston (USA)
- 1969 (solo) Museum of Art. University of Oregon, Eugene (USA)
- 1970 (solo) New Boston City Hall Gallery (USA)
- 1971 (solo, touring) University of Massachusetts (USA)
- 1972 (solo) Creative Photography Gallery, M.l.T., Cambridge (USA)
- 1972 (solo) Carl Siembab Gallery. Cambridge (USA)
- 1973 (solo) St. John's College Art Gallery, Santa Fe (USA)
- 1974 (solo) Wiggin Gallery, The Boston Public Library (USA)
- 1975 (solo) Museum of Fine Arts, Santa Fe (USA)
- 1977 (solo) Photographers' Gallery & Workshop, Melbourne (AUS)
- 1977 Courthouse, April 12–July 10, Museum of Modern Art, New York
- 1978 (solo) Australian Centre for Photography, Sydney (AUS)
- 1978 (group) Mirrors and Windows: American Photography since 1960, July 26–October 2, Museum of Modern Art, New York
- 1979 (solo) Susan Spiritus Gallery, Newport Beach (USA)
- 1979 (solo) Focus Gallery, San Francisco (USA)
- 1979 (solo) Fine Arts Museum, Santa Fe (USA)
- 1979 (group) Edward Steichen Photography Center Reinstallation, December 21, Museum of Modern Art, New York
- 1980 (solo) M.l.T. Creative Photography Gallery, Cambridge (USA)
- 1980 (solo) William Lyons Gallery, Coconut Grove (USA)
- 1980 (group) Reinstallation of the Collection, October 23, 1980 – January 3, Museum of Modern Art, New York
- 1980 (solo) Atlanta Gallery of Photography (USA)
- 1981 (solo) Phoenix Art Museum (USA)
- 1981 (group) American Landscapes July 9–October 4, Museum of Modern Art, New York
- 1981 (solo) Jeb Gallery, Providence (USA)
- 1981 (solo) Sheldon Memorial Art Gallery, Lincoln (USA)
- 1981 (solo) Portfolio Gallery, Oklahoma City (USA)
- 1982 (solo) Images Gallery. Cincinnati (USA)
- 1983 (solo) Boston Atheneum (USA)

== Collections ==
- J. Paul Getty Museum, Los Angeles
- Metropolitan Museum of Art, New York,
- National Gallery of Canada, Ottawa
- Smithsonian American Art Museum

== Publications ==
- Clift, William; Kane, Paul (2012), Mont St. Michel and Shiprock, Santa Fe, New Mexico Pearmain Press, ISBN 978-0-9797524-3-8
- Clift, William; Kane, Paul (1993), A Hudson landscape, photographs, Autographed Books Collection, William Clift Editions, ISBN 978-0-9618165-1-3
- Clift, William; Amon Carter Museum of Western Art; Art Institute of Chicago (1987), Certain places, William Clift Editions, ISBN 978-0-9618165-0-6
- Kennedy, William-; Clift, William; New York (State). Temporary State Commission on the Restoration of the Capitol (1986), The Capitol in Albany, Aperture Book, ISBN 978-0-89381-209-6
- 1971 Portfolio Old Boston City Hall William Clift (USA). Intro. Sinclair Hitchings
- 1974 "New heaven and a new earth", in Ulmann, Doris; Coles, Robert; Clift, William (1974), The darkness and the light : photographs, Aperture, ISBN 978-0-912334-60-8
- 1975 Portfolio «New Mexico» c/o William Clift (USA). Intro. Eliot Porter
- 1975 Beacon Hill, a Walking Tour» c/o Little Brown (USA). Text Alex McIntyre
- 1977 The Great West, Real/Ideal» c/o Department of Fine Arts. University of Colorado. Boulder (USA)
- 1978 «Court House» c/o Horizon Press ( USA)
- 1978 «Mirrors & Windows» (USA). Text John Szarkowski
- 1978 "Court House series" in ''Light Vision November–December, 1977
- 1979 Portfolio Court House Portfolto W. Cltft (USA)
- 1979 American Images McGraw Hill (USA). Text Renato Danese
- 1979 Photography in New Mexico, University of New Mexico Press (USA). Text Van Deren Coke
- 1981 American Landscapes c/o Museum of Modern Art (USA). Text John Szarkowski
- 1981 American Photographers in the National Parks c/o Viking (USA). Text Robert Ketchum
- 1982 Counterparts - Form and Emotion in Photographs, Metropolitan Museum of Art (USA). Text Weston Naef
- 1982 Masterworks of American Photography Oxmoor House (USA). Text Martha A. Sandweiss
- 1983 Landmarks Reviewed, Pensacola Museum of Art (USA). Text Barry Winiker
- 1983 International Photography 1920-1980 c/o The Australian National Gallery (AUS). Text Ian North
