= Persona (Lorenzo Senni EP) =

EP by Lorenzo Senni
- Released: 11 November 2016
- Studio: Andromeda Studio. Turin; Alchemy Mastering, London
- Genre: Hard trance; IDM
- Length: 31:32
- Label: Warp
- Producer: Lorenzo Senni

Lorenzo Senni chronology
Superimpositions (2014)	Persona (2016)

Singles from Persona
- 1. "Win in the Flat World" Released: 24 October 2016

Persona is an extended play by Italian producer Lorenzo Senni, released on the label Warp Records on 11 November 2016. The EP showcases Senni's viewpoint as a "Rave Voyeur" character (as showed on its cover art by Ed Atkins) of the music and culture of hard trance, as well as the genre's relations to dancehall and the rest of the electronic music dance spectrum. Persona differed from Senni's past trance releases in terms of composition and production; he was influenced by hardcore punk to have the EP consist more on chords rather than arpeggios, and the recordings of the Roland JP-8000 Supersaw sounds he used were edited and altered with effects instead of just left raw, leading to a much more expressive scope in terms of sound according to critic Patric Fallon. The album garnered very favorable reviews from music journalists upon its release, landing at the number four spot of Fact magazine's list of the best albums of 2016.

== Concept and composition ==
"‘Persona’ can mean the character of a person, but in Italian it is a neutral way to describe a person. I realize now, after six years, I understand a bit of myself through this record. Or I understand the very basic things – how I was experiencing this 15 years ago. So it’s more personal, it’s more melodic or more composed, shaped in an emotional way.”

— Senni in an interview with Fact magazine

The cover art for Persona is a screenshot of a video by British video artist Ed Atkins, and depicts an androgynous human who looks through a hole, "interested to the point of making [their] nose touch the wall – but not too much." This is a representation of Senni's character as a "Rave Voyeur," or stranger of the dance music scene, that he was having in the previous six years of his music career. He also called the figure in the artwork both human and robotic: "It’s a character, but he’s supposed to be everyone, not really human. It’s not me. It also is me.” Senni titled the album Persona because, with the EP, he wanted listeners to know how he really heard and saw dance music and its culture as a "voyeur."

With Persona, Senni went for a hardcore punk-influenced sound, meaning that there are much more chords on the EP than Senni's previous works, and the arpeggios serve as only a counterpoint to these chords. Persona is also very similar to music of Senni's project Stargate, in that it includes influences of anime, cyberpunk and Japanese culture and uses melodic elements like "powerful" chords for "deep emotional resonance," journalist John Twells wrote. Twells compared the melodies of Persona to that of the works of composer Ryuichi Sakamoto and wrote that they "generate vivid landscapes that wouldn’t be out of place in Neo-Tokyo." The sticker placed over Atkins' screenshot in the cover art replicates the colors of the stripes used by independent label Revelation Records, further adding to the EP's hardcore punk element.

Persona is a "study" of 1990s hard trance music as well as its relations to dancehall and electronic dance music overall. Pitchfork reviewer Andy Beta wrote that the tracks on Persona "revel and find depth in synthetic surfaces, make pop allusions, and simulate the maddening sensations that arise from the digital corporeality of our modern life." Beta analyzed that the purpose of the record was to "isolate the builds and breakdowns of trance." Music reviewer SCVSCV described Persona as "music that obsessively celebrates and virtually ignores" the culture of electronic dance music. The EP follows Senni's "hyperreal voyeurism" that comes from his love of the club music the EP is influenced by. As SCVSCV writes, "Senni’s technical image management stems from a profound vitalism rooted in the distinct human need to zero-out from self-organizational processes to approach further repetition and abstraction — the organic gene splicing of music such that its conceptual and functional material are indistinguishable." Therefore, the EP is a "sort of critical music for folks who love music and all that it does for a community, even if, in the case of his work, the community is one built on celebrating both the visceral and meta qualities that electronic music concurrently and easily provides."

SCVSCV compared Senni's "intense love" of the music being referenced on Persona to that of the works of metal band Sunn O))). SCVSCV writes that the MIDI notes used for Persona are "genetic code" of the conventions of the trance genre Senni "studies." The "accelerative and deeply focused" pace of the record also indicate that Senni is an "addict" of his music studying activity. SCVSCV also noted that the EP had a "deeply oscillating, emotional core [...[ that odd place of human vitality and sentiment in any scholarly, observational method." In summarizing this studying aspect of the EP, SCVSCV wrote, "Senni’s method acts as a constraint on trance, but only to tease out its molten form from active and morphogenetically pregnant sonic material, from those flows of energy, those nutrients manifesting themselves as a crystalline code temporarily abstract from its ecosystem, oscillating for a moment only to manifest through it farther and further."

Persona borrows what critic Patric Fallon described as the "austere" and "clinical" trance style of Senni's album Quantum Jelly (2012). It was produced by Senni in the same conventions as Quantum Jelly, where every track was made only out of Supersaw sounds from the Roland JP-8000 synthesizer. Unlike Quantum Jelly, where the synthesizer was recorded to two audio channels without any additional recording, sound altercation or overdubbing, Persona involved Senni recording sounds from the synthesizer to a multitrack recorder, editing the recordings and adding effects to them. Fallon suggested Senni's change of the production process from Quantum Jelly to Persona led to a much more expressive scope in the EP's sound. Despite being a record of an electronic dance music genre, that being trance, Persona is devoid of any bass or drums, aspects of dance music that listeners are the most into. Fallon described the tracks as "club spectacles rather than bangers," in that they are "more slippery" than the works of English electronic musician Sophie. This is because it would take time for the listener to digest the "walloping chord stabs, popcorn-popping synth tones and comically bright melodies" that is present throughout the extended play.

== Track information ==
Persona opens with "Win In The Flat World," described by SCVSCV as an "ecstatic ballad that emerges with a pulsing core of optimistic melody — simultaneously extending and quickening its form to where the narrative time of trance’s usual formula is flattened." Fallon labeled the song "Rave Voyeur" as a "diamond-cut alloy of euphoria, chugging rhythm, harmonic elegance and hyperreal sound design." Music reviewer SCVSCV noted the track's "spacious" sound; the first half consists of "fluttering" synthesizer sounds and plucking noises that "meander around each other" before there is a drop, an electronic music element not present in most of Senni's works. Beta called it the EP's best track, while NPR Music reviewer DeForrest Brown, covered it for his column "Songs We Love." SCVSCV called “Emotiva1234” the EP's best song and "one of the most repeatable and infectious tracks of year." He wrote that it "bumps with the stutter-like presence of a pristine, elated grime beat."

"One Life, One Chance" consists of "syncopated, whipcrack rhythms" and crackling saw wave sounds that shift "between stuttering frenzy and blasts of anthemic hooks, before Senni breaks the track down to its delirious center and then blows it into towering proportions," wrote Fallon, who used the song as an example of the EP's huge range of sound. The EP's tones calms down yet still remains hectic with "Angel," as the song is "slow and dreamlike but with the same weight and hyperbolic urgency of everything else" as Fallon analyzes. Persona closes with "Forever True," which starts at a very fast tempo before it immediately changes into a song that is "spare, slow, and hushed" and a "catchy" melody fades into the song, wrote Beta.

== Release and promotion ==
On 24 October 2016, it was announced Persona would be released on the label Warp Records on 11 November 2016, and "Win In The Flat World" was released as the EP's lead single. On 27 October 2016, Senni performed a show at Umbrella Factory in New York City and the Warp To Warp, Club To Club Festival in Turin, Italy promoting Persona. A performance at LN-CC on 10 November in London and another at the Dude Club in Milan on 19 November served as launch parties for the album. Persona was issued in digital stores and 12" vinyl on 11 November 2016.

== Critical reception ==
Professional ratings
Review scores
Source	Rating
Crack	7/10
Pitchfork	7.5/10
Resident Advisor	4.5/5
Salad.Days	8/10
Tiny Mix Tapes	4.5/5 stars

Persona garnered very favorable reviews upon its release. A reviewer for the Italian magazine Salad.Days described the tracks as "really wonderful, vischiosissime, valuable electronic [song]s that deserve[] to [put] Senni [on] a stage to large capacities." SCVSCV, writing for Tiny Mix Tapes, honored Persona as "a work wholly deserving of such a major stage as an enduring effort to collapse and incisively observe the grisly scene of 2016 electronic music and its restless sonic constituency." He praised the record's "critical and joyous" tone, writing that it would attract listeners that were into "studious" music ripe for critical analysis while also appealing to mainstream listeners that were into "playful" music.

Twells honored Persona for its "eagerness to explore, a freedom and a desire to shake off the fusty shackles of experimental music." He described it as "deeper and more developed than [Senni's previous releases], anchored by memorable hooks and melodies which sit confidently above Senni’s familiar JP-8000 Supersaw patterns." Persona landed at number four on Fact magazine's list of the best albums of 2016, where journalist Scott Wilson calling the EP Senni's best release so far.

== Track listing ==
No.	Title	Length
1.	"Win in the Flat World"	4:53
2.	"Rave Voyeur"	6:51
3.	"Emotiva1234"	4:51
4.	"One Life, One Chance"	3:02
5.	"Angel"	6:44
6.	"Forever True"	5:17
Total length:		31:32

== Personnel ==
- Written and produced by Lorenzo Senni
- Mixed by Senni and Max Casacci at Andromeda Studio in Turin, Italy
- Mastered by Matt Colton at Alchemy Mastering in London, England
- Cover art by Ed Atkins
- Design and layout by Daniel Sansavini

== Release history ==
Region	Date	Format(s)	Label
Worldwide	11 November 2016	Digital download; vinyl	Warp
