= Folly for Mrs Macquarie =

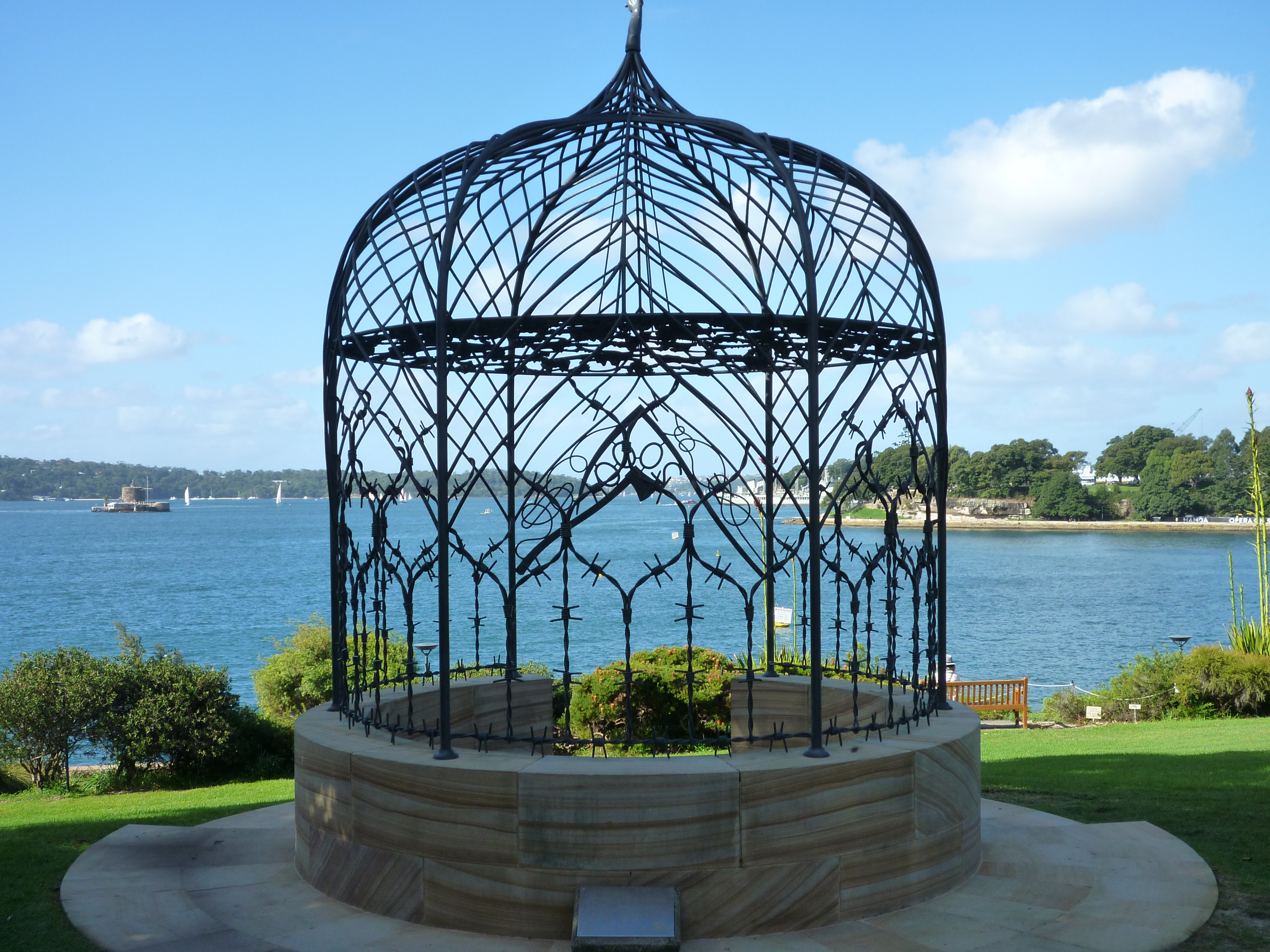
Folly for Mrs Macquarie in 2016

A Folly for Mrs Macquarie is a 1999 sculpture by Fiona Hall. It is situated in the Royal Botanic Garden, Sydney. It is named for Elizabeth Macquarie, the wife of the Governor of New South Wales, Lachlan Macquarie.

== Location ==
The Folly for Mrs Macquarie is situated in the Royal Botanic Garden, Sydney. The folly faces the foreshore of Sydney Harbour with views towards Farm Cove, Sydney Opera House and Mrs Macquaries Point. It was built on the likely site of a now demolished folly built by Elizabeth Macquarie, the wife of Lachlan Macquarie who served as Governor of New South Wales from 1810 to 1821. The Macquaries landscaped the area in the picturesque style then prevalent in Europe.

== Design ==
The folly is built in the Gothic Revival style favoured by the Macquaries and decorated with abstract historic references to early Australian colonial history. The roof of the folly is decorated with fronds from the Norfolk Island pine. The pine was thought by the early European colonisers of Australia to be ideal for making ship's masts but the brittle timber proved unsuitable. The folly references both indigenous and introduced plant species as well as tools. The heraldic crest of the Macquarie family is represented by a raised fist clasping a dagger as a finial. The windows are formed from barbed wire which symbolise the division of the land. The ceiling is made of animal bones from native species including marsupials that were once found on the site.

== Interpretation ==
The work was intended as a contemporary folly building. The term 'folly' also intending to refer to the folly of early European attempts to colonise Australia. It was installed and unveiled in October 2000 as part of the Sydney Sculpture Walk. The walk consists of 10 contemporary artworks that were commissioned to mark to the 2000 Summer Olympics in Sydney and the centenary of the Federation of Australia in 2001. The works on Sydney Sculpture Walk were chosen by curator Sally Couacaud. Nine of the ten artists chosen by Couacaud were women.
