= Marie Cosindas =

American photographer

- Born: September 22, 1923; Boston, Massachusetts U.S.
- Died: May 25, 2017 (aged 93)
- Known for: Photography

Marie Cosindas (September 22, 1923 – May 25, 2017) was an American photographer. She was best known for her evocative still lifes and color portraits. Her use of color photography in her work distinguished her from other photographers in the 1960s and 1970s. Most of her photographs were portraits and pictures of objects like dolls, flowers, and masks.

In 1962, Ansel Adams recommended Cosindas to Polaroid for their artist trial of their new instant-developing color film. She was the fifth woman, and only the second photographer working in color, to have a show at the Museum of Modern Art in New York, in 1966.

== Biography ==
Cosindas was born in Boston, Massachusetts on September 22, 1923, the eighth of ten children born to a Greek immigrant family. Her father was a carpenter. She grew up in the South End.

After initially studying fashion design at the Modern School of Fashion Design in Boston and painting at the Boston Museum School, she worked as a textile designer from 1944 to 1960. During this period she began to integrate with, and eventually became part of the stable of photographers that belonged to the Carl Siembab Gallery, with whom she shared a building in Boston.

It was during a trip to her family's homeland, Greece, that Cosindas began to use photography as her primary medium. Using a 2 1/4 square Rollieflex, Cosindas took snapshots of the Grecian landscape, which she intended to later translate into paintings. However, she was so taken with the photographic results she gave up painting.

Cosindas studied with Paul Caponigro and attended photography workshops with Ansel Adams in 1961. While studying with Ansel Adams, she worked almost exclusively in the medium of black-and-white photography, making several series of still lifes and architectural photographs. She also worked with Minor White during 1963-1964.

In 1962, recommended by Ansel Adams, Cosindas was one of about a dozen photographers who were invited by Dr. Edwin Land and the Polaroid Corporation to test their new instant-developing color film. From this time she began to work exclusively in color, manipulating various components of the process to produce the warm tones she preferred. Cosindas found that using Polaroid freed her from all the technicalities involved in making color prints, and she was able to concentrate just on her images. Using only available light and often having only a few minutes in which to photograph her subjects, Cosindas produced a remarkably distinct portfolio of portraits of well-known figures. In addition to her portraits, Cosindas created evocative still life images incorporating flowers, fruits and vegetables, textiles, jewelry, trinkets, and other objects Cosindas carefully arranged then photographed.

Along with Paul Caponigro, William Clift, Walter Chappell and Carl Chiarenza, Cosindas co-founded the Association of Heliographers, a New York photographers' cooperative that included some of the most influential American art photographers of the 1960s. The Heliographers' first public exhibition took place on 1 July 1963. The show promoted 'camera vision' as a way of seeing and recording the world meaningfully rather than mechanically".

Using a view camera, natural light and color filters, Cosindas's work played a vital role in establishing the use of color in fine art photography during the 1960s and her solo show at the Museum of Modern Art in New York in 1966 was one of the institution's first to feature color photography. A number of major exhibitions of her work have been held, and it is featured in many prominent collections. Subjects of her portraits work include Andy Warhol, Truman Capote, Faye Dunaway, Robert Redford, Paul Newman, Ezra Pound and Tom Wolfe, among others.

Cosindas lectured at the Photographic Resource Center at Boston University. In conjunction with the PRC 2013 Gala, Cosindas was featured in the exhibition Marie Cosindas: A Life of Color, and was given a Lifetime Achievement Award. Other awards received during her career include a Guggenheim grant, a Rockefeller grant, the Isobel S. Sinesi Lifetime Achievement in Fashion Award in 1996 from the School of Fashion Design, and honorary degrees from Philadelphia's Moore College of Art and the Art Institute of Boston.

Cosindas died on May 25, 2017, in Boston, at the age of 93.

== Bibliography ==
- Feldman, Susan, ed. (1979). Marie Cosindas, color photographs (2nd printing, 1979. ed.). Boston: New York Graphic Society. ISBN 9780821207437. "With an essay by Tom Wolfe"
