= John Divola =

American artist

- Born: 6 June 1949 (age 77); Los Angeles, California, United States
- Known for: Photography
- Website: Official website

John Divola (born 6 June 1949) is an American contemporary visual artist and educator, living in Riverside, California. He works in photography, describing himself as exploring the landscape by looking for the edge between the abstract and the specific. He is a professor in the art department at University of California Riverside.

Divola's books include Continuity, Isolated Houses, Dogs Chasing My Car In The Desert, and Three Acts. His work was included in group exhibitions at the Museum of Modern Art in New York in 1978, 1989 and 2000 and in the 1981 and 2017 Whitney Biennials. In 1986 he received a Guggenheim Fellowship.

== Early life and education ==
Divola was born in 1949 in Los Angeles, CA. He received a B.A. from California State University, Northridge in 1971 and later received an M.F.A. from University of California, Los Angeles in 1974.

== Works ==
In his Zuma project, he has described being interested in the relation between real artworks and representations of them, and the issues of the natural and the artificial. Divola said "I attempted ... to develop a practice in which there could be no distinction between the document and the original." In his series of photographs from 1977, he used deserted houses on Zuma Beach and covered their walls in graffiti. He photographed the ocean from the house's interior through windows and cracks. Divola states:

"On initially arriving I would move through the house looking for areas or situations to photograph. If nothing seemed to interest me I would move things around or do some spray painting. The painting was done in much the same way that one might doodle on a piece of paper. At that point I would return to the camera and explore what ever new potentials existed."

These cyclical images skillfully juxtapose romantic skies and sunsets with a seaside structure that, frame by frame, deteriorates into ruin as it is vandalized by the artist and others who eventually set it on fire. Divola's works trace a schematic desire for escape, movement and transcendence.

"My acts, my painting, my photographing, my considering, are part of, not separate from, this process of evolution and change. These photographs are not so much about this process as they are remnants from it. My participation was not so much one of intellectual consideration as one of visceral involvement."

In the work Dogs Chasing My Car in the Desert, the images show dogs running wildly after the artist’s car. These black-and-white photographs capture a haunting moment that reveals a duality between absence and presence. The dogs' behavior suggests they lack prior stimuli and feel lonely. At the same time, the dogs show an intense reaction to the present and a heightened sense of the moment.

"It could be viewed as a visceral and kinetic dance. Here we have two vectors and velocities, that of a dog and that of a car and, seeing that a camera will never capture reality and that a dog will never catch a car, evidence of devotion to a hopeless enterprise".

In the photographic series "Dark Star," Divola has painted a single black spot on the interior walls of various dilapidated houses located in Inland Southern California. This intervention causes the images to resemble black holes or voids within the ruined domestic setting.

In the "As Far As I Can Get" project, he made photographs by pushing the self-timer button on his camera. An exposure is made in 10 seconds.

== Educator ==
He has held the position of Professor in the art department at University of California Riverside since 1988.

== In popular culture ==
Divola's photograph Zuma was used as the cover art for American rock band Deerhunter's 2015 studio album Fading Frontier.

In 2020 Italian electronic music producer Lorenzo Senni used "Zuma 33" as the front cover of his Album "Scacco Matto".

== Publications ==
- Gallery Min Catalog. 1987.
- Continuity. Ram, 1998. ISBN 0963078542.
- Isolated Houses. Tucson, AZ: Nazraeli, 2001. ISBN 3-923922-80-9. With an introduction by Jan Tumlir. Edition of 1000 copies.
- Dogs Chasing My Car in the Desert. Tucson, AZ: Nazraeli, 2004. ISBN 9781590051054.
- Three Acts: Vandalism, Los Angeles International Airport Noise Abatement Zone (LAX NAZ), Zuma. New York City: Aperture, 2006. ISBN 1-931788-95-2. With an essay by David Campany and an interview with Jan Tumlir.
- Seven Dogs. One Picture Book 45. Portland, OR: Nazraeli, 2007. Edition of 500 copies. "A book of seven reproductions and one original color photograph.".
- As far as I could get. Gothenburg, Sweden: Farewell, 2008. ISBN 9789197688833.
- LAX NAZ: Los Angeles International Airport Noise Abatement Zone (Exterior Views), 1975. Part of Six by Six series, set 3. Nazraeli, 2012. The other volumes are by William Christenberry, Eduardo del Valle & Mirta Gómez, John Divola, LAX NAZ, Daido Moriyama, Karin Apollonia Müller, and Carrie Mae Weems.
- Supermarket. One Picture Book 81. Portland, OR: Nazraeli, 2013. ISBN 9781590053911. Edition of 500 copies. "A book of 7 reproductions and one original photograph".
- San Fernando Valley. NZ Library, set 1, v.2. Nazraeli, 2014. ISBN 978-1-59005-384-3. Edition of 350 copies. There are 18 volumes in total by various authors.
- Vandalism. Mack, 2018. ISBN 9781912339006.
- Chroma. Jesi, Italy: Skinnerboox, 2020. ISBN 978-88-94895-33-9. With a transcription of an interview between Divola and David Campany. Edition of 800 copies.
- Terminus. London: Mack, 2021. ISBN 978-1-913620-08-0.
- Scapes. Skinnerboox, 2022. With an essay by David Campany. Edition of 750 copies.

== Awards ==
- Individual artist fellowship from the National Endowment for the Arts, 1973, 1976, 1979, 1990
- Guggenheim Fellowship from the John Simon Guggenheim Memorial Foundation, 1986

== Group exhibitions ==
- Mirrors and Windows: American Photography since 1960, Museum of Modern Art, New York, 1978
- California Photography: Remaking Make-Believe, Museum of Modern Art, New York, 1989
- Into the Sunset: Photography’s Image of the American West, Museum of Modern Art, New York, 2009

== Collections ==
Divola's work is held in the following permanent collections:

- Carnegie Museum of Art, Pittsburgh, PA
- Center for Creative Photography, University of Arizona, Tucson, AZ
- Art Institute of Chicago, Chicago: 13 prints (as of January 2021)
- Fotomuseum Winterthur, Winterthur, Switzerland: 20 prints (as of January 2021)
- George Eastman Museum, Rochester, NY: 17 prints (as of January 2021)
- Hammer Museum, UCLA, Los Angeles, CA: 15 prints (as of January 2021)
- Henry Art Gallery, University of Washington, Seattle, Washington
- J. Paul Getty Museum, Los Angeles: 156 prints (as of January 2021)
- Museum of Contemporary Photography, Chicago: 3 prints (as of January 2021)
- Museum of Modern Art, New York: 8 prints (as of January 2021)
- Philadelphia Museum of Art, Philadelphia
- San Francisco Museum of Modern Art, San Francisco: 8 prints and a series of 12 prints (as of January 2021)
- Whitney Museum, New York: 14 prints (as of 29 April 2023)
