= John Paul Caponigro =

American photographer

John Paul Caponigro (born June 23, 1965) is an environmental fine art landscape photographer.

== Early life and education ==
John Paul Caponigro was born in Boston. He is the son of the American photographer Paul Caponigro and Eleanor Caponigro, a graphic designer. He attended Yale University, and the University of California, Santa Cruz where he was trained as a painter and later as a photographer.

== Life and work ==
After college Caponigro moved to Maine and became an artist in residence at the Center for Creative Imaging. He now works with photo-based digital imaging as his primary medium.

Caponigro contributes to photographic and news publications. These include Apple.com, and The Huffington Post. In 2000 Adobe Press published his first book Adobe Master Class. It was followed up with a second printing in 2003. This book describes techniques and use of digital technology for artistic purposes. He has also self-published catalogs of his work. Caponigro has authored DVDs on Photoshop techniques through Acme Educational, a digital media learning resource.

== Exhibitions ==
He has shown in Italy at the Museo Archeologico Regionale, Val d'Aosta. Pieces of his Antarctica work were shown at the Peabody Essex Museum in Salem Massachusetts in 2008.

== Collections ==
Caponigro's photographic work is included in museum collections. These include Princeton University and The Museum of Fine Arts Houston. The National Museum of American History has a collection of Caponigro's work that includes one of every media that he has used. This collection includes his early silver gelatin prints, his current pigmented ink prints, preliminary sketches and his print-on-demand books. The Smithsonian is also collecting the tools he uses to produce his work, this includes his software, computers, printers, cameras and cell phones.

Caponigro interviewed over 40 American photographers from 1995 through 2007. These dialogs were published in Camera Arts Magazine the audio tapes of which are now archived at the Eastman House Library, Rochester, New York.

== Awards ==
In 2003 he was Photo District News' Annual Winner, and in 2008 he won the Communication Arts Award of Excellence.

== Personal life ==
Caponigro moved to Cushing, Maine in 1989 with his photographer wife Arduina, and their daughter.
