= Lorenzo Senni =

Italian music producer

- Also known as: Stargate
- Born: 1983 (age 42–43); Cesena, Emilia-Romagna, Italy
- Genres: Electronic; experimental
- Years active: 2007–present
- Labels: Presto!?; Warp
- Website: lorenzosenni.com

Lorenzo Senni (born 1983) is an Italian musician and visual artist. His first release on Warp Records was in 2016. His full-length album Scacco Matto was released on April 24, 2020. His most recent release, All Ages, is slated for release on November 20th 2026..

He is also the founder of Presto!? Records.

== Discography ==
=== Studio albums ===
- Early Works (Kesh Recordings / Presto!?, 2008)
- Dunno (Presto!?, 2010)
- Quantum Jelly (Mego, 2012)
- Superimpositions (Boomkat, 2014)
- Scacco Matto (Warp, 2020)
- All Ages (Warp, 2026)

=== EPs ===
- Persona (Warp, 2016)
- The Challenge (with Francesco Fantini) (Warp, 2018)
- The Shape of RemixXxes to Come (remixes) (Warp, 2018)
