= Jeff Caponigro =

- Other names: Jeffrey R. Caponigro
- Occupations: Public relations executive Entrepreneur; Journalist

Jeffrey R. Caponigro is an American public relations and marketing executive, entrepreneur, and former journalist. He is the founder and CEO of Caponigro Public Relations Inc., Southfield, Michigan, and the Executive Vice President-Corporate Communications and Chief Marketing Officer for Trion Solutions, Inc., one of the United States' largest HR-administration companies, with corporate headquarters in Troy, Michigan.

== Career ==
Caponigro graduated from Central Michigan University in 1979 with a Bachelor of Arts degree in journalism and English, and was a sports reporter/columnist for Observer and Eccentric among others. One of his columns for the Midland Daily News was published in the book Best Sports Stories by Irving T. Marsh and Edward Ehre.

Caponigro established 'Caponigro Public Relations' (CPR) in the Detroit suburb of Southfield, Michigan in 1995, as a company to manage crisis situations related to product recalls, environmental issues, tainted fast food, employee layoffs, work-related accidents and deaths, plant closings, government probes, malpractice and discrimination cases, shortfalls in profit performance, hostile takeovers, mergers and acquisitions, product-related lawsuits, negative media coverage, strikes, boycotts, damaging rumors, accidental deaths, among others. He is its president and CEO. Before founding CPR, Caponigro was Chairman and CEO of a Detroit-based public relations firm for 11 years. Prior to that, he was a Vice President for another Detroit-area public relations firm.

In 2001, Caponigro was inducted into the Public Relations Society of America recognizing lifetime achievement of the country’s top public relations professionals. Caponigro is an accredited member of PRSA, and currently serves as Chairman of the Accreditation Committee for the Public Relations Society of America’s Tampa Bay Chapter, a past officer of PRSA’s Detroit chapter and a former member of PRSA’s National Accreditation Board.

In 1988, Caponigro was awarded PRSA’s 'Silver Anvil Award' for the public affairs program to encourage passage of seat belt use laws in 48 states and increase national seat belt use by 300 percent. That program was named by PR Week magazine as one of the '20 Greatest PR Campaigns Ever'. He also has received national recognition for his crisis-management work on the largest recall in the history of the automotive industry – the 1995 recall of seat belts.

In 2002, Michigan Governor John Engler appointed Caponigro to serve a six-year term as a trustee on the board of Central Michigan University. Caponigro served two years as Chairman of the CMU Board of Trustees and was inducted into the CMU Journalism Hall of Fame in 2009. He established an endowment at Central Michigan University that provides a full-ride scholarship in perpetuity for financially needy students majoring in journalism or public relations, and established a separate endowment at Central Michigan University to fund the 'Caponigro Multi-Media Journalism Lab' on campus.

In 2007, CPR opened a second location in downtown Tampa.

=== Author ===
Caponigro is author of The Crisis Counselor: A step-by-step guide to managing a business crisis. The book became a best-seller on the subject of crisis management and is published in English, Chinese, Polish, Norwegian and Danish.

His crisis-management advice is featured in the public relations textbook Business Communications Today by Courtland L. Bovée, John V. Thill, and Barbara E. Schatzman.
