= Bill Henson =

Australian contemporary art photographer (born 1955)

Bill Henson AO
- Born: 7 October 1955 (age 71); Melbourne, Australia
- Known for: Photography
- Website: www.billhenson.com

Bill Henson AO (born 7 October 1955) is an Australian contemporary art photographer.

== Art ==
Henson has exhibited nationally and internationally in galleries such as the Solomon R. Guggenheim Museum in New York, the Venice Biennale, the National Gallery of Victoria in Melbourne, Australia, the Art Gallery of New South Wales in Sydney, Australia and the Bibliothèque Nationale in Paris. His current practice involves holding one exhibition in Australia every two years, and up to three overseas exhibitions each year.

The use of chiaroscuro is common throughout his works, through underexposure and adjustment in printing. His photographs' use of bokeh is intended to give them a painterly atmosphere. The work is often presented as diptychs, triptychs and in other groupings, and the exhibitions are specifically curated by Henson to reflect a sense of musicality.

Duality is a recurring theme of Henson's work, often in combination with adolescent subjects. He frequently employs a flattened perspective through the use of telephoto lenses. His works are often in the form of staged tableaux in which faces of the subjects are often blurred or partly shadowed and do not directly face the viewer.

Henson states that he is not interested in a political or sociological agenda.

== Life and influences ==
Raised in the Eastern suburbs of Melbourne, Henson studied Visual Arts and Design 1974–1975 at Prahran College of Advanced Education where Athol Shmith was head of the Photography program and John Cato and Paul Cox were lecturers. He did not complete the diploma, but the nineteen-year-old Henson's work was promoted by Shmith to Jennie Boddington, inaugural Curator of Photography at the National Gallery of Victoria with the result that Henson's first solo show was exhibited there in 1975.

From his period as a student until its closure in 1980, he worked at The Bookshop of Margareta Webber 343 Little Collins Street Melbourne, which specialised in luxurious books on ballet, dance and the visual arts. Leaving the bookshop, he traveled and photographed in Eastern Europe. He taught briefly at the Victorian College of the Arts in Melbourne, where he met Luminist Melbourne painter Louise Hearman in 1981. Henson's long-term relationship with Hearman has been noted as mutually influential on their art. Hearman won the 2014 Moran portrait prize, Australia's richest at $A150,000, with her double portrait of Bill Henson.

Henson was appointed an Officer of the Order of Australia in the 2024 Australia Day Honours for "distinguished service to the visual arts as a photographer, and to the promotion of Australian culture".

== Controversies ==
=== Images seized ===
On 22 May 2008, the opening night of Bill Henson's 2007–2008 exhibition at the Roslyn Oxley9 Gallery in Paddington, Sydney, was cancelled after eight individual complaints were made to Police voicing concerns about an email invitation from the Gallery to a "Private View" that depicted photographs of a nude 13-year-old girl. Hetty Johnston, a child protection advocate also lodged a complaint with the New South Wales police. On the same day a Sydney Morning Herald columnist, Miranda Devine, had also written a scathing article in response to viewing the email invitation, which precipitated heated talk-back and media discussion throughout the day. In the process of removing the images from the Gallery, Police found more photographs of naked children on exhibition among various large format photographs of nonfigurative subjects, which they later sought to examine for the purposes of determining their legal status under the NSW Crimes Act and child protection legislation. Following discussions with the Gallery and a decision by Henson, the Gallery cancelled the opening and postponed the show.

It was announced on 23 May, that a number of the images in the exhibition had been seized by police local Area Commander Alan Sicard, with the intention of charging Bill Henson, the Gallery, or both with "publishing an indecent article" under the Crimes Act. The seized images were also removed from the Roslyn Oxley9 Gallery website, where remainder of the series could be viewed online.

The situation provoked a national debate on censorship. In a televised interview, Prime Minister Kevin Rudd stated that he found the images "absolutely revolting" and that they had "no artistic merit". These views swiftly drew censure from members of the "creative stream" who attended the 2020 Summit convened by Rudd (18–19 April 2008), led by actress Cate Blanchett.

On 5 June 2008, the former director of the National Gallery of Australia, Betty Churcher, said it was "not surprising" that the New South Wales Department of Public Prosecutions (DPP) would announce its official recommendation that no charges be laid regarding the Sydney Roslyn Oxley9 gallery's collection of photographs by artist Bill Henson. Ms Churcher said it would have been ridiculous to drag the case through the courts:

I'm very pleased that the public prosecutor has decided that it's likely to end the debacle because they always do, as soon as you take art into court it never works ... The court is not the place to decide matters of art.

On 6 June 2008, it was reported in The Age that police would not prosecute Bill Henson over his photographs of naked teenagers, after they were declared "mild and justified" and given a PG rating by the Australian Classification Board, suggesting viewing by children under the age of 16 is suitable with parental guidance.

Australian scholar Niall Lucy criticised Devine's response to Henson's art in his 2010 book Pomo Oz: Fear and Loathing Down Under. David Marr's book about the 2008 incident The Henson case was listed for the 2009 Victorian Premier's Literary Award and the 2009 Prime Minister's Literary Awards.

=== Selection of models ===
On 4 October 2008, Henson became the centre of controversy again after it was revealed in extracts of The Henson case that in 2007 he visited St Kilda Park Primary School to pick out potential models for his artwork. Henson was allowed entry into the school and escorted by principal Sue Knight around the school grounds and picked two children he thought would be suitable – one child, a boy, was later photographed after his parents were approached by the school on behalf of the artist.

An investigation into the matter was launched by the Department of Education on 6 October 2008. The investigation found that the principal had complied with departmental policy, and had no case to answer.

== Exhibitions (selected) ==
A few of his exhibitions:

1975

- Bill Henson, National Gallery of Victoria, Melbourne

1981

- Three Sequences: Bill Henson, Photographers' Gallery, London, 12 Nov – Dec 13 1981

1985

- Bill Henson, Untitled 1983/84, Pinacotheca, Melbourne, Australia, July

1989

- Bill Henson Fotografien, Museum Moderner Kunst, Palais Liechtenstein, Wien

1990

- Bill Henson Photographs, Bibliothèque Nationale, Paris

1993

- Bill Henson, Tel Aviv Museum of Art

1998

- Bill Henson, ACP Galerie Peter Schuengel, Salzburg

2004

- Presence 3: Bill Henson, The Speed Art Museum, Kentucky

2006

- Bill Henson, Institute of Modern Art, Brisbane

2008

- Bill Henson 1998/1999, Galerie Thierry Marlat, Paris, France

2008

- Bill Henson, Robert Miller Gallery, New York, United States
- Bill Henson, Roslyn Oxley9 Gallery, Sydney, Australia

2010

- Bill Henson, Roslyn Oxley9 Gallery, Sydney, Australia

2011

- Bill Henson, Tolarno Galleries, Melbourne, Australia

2012

- Diane Arbus, Bill Henson, Robert Mapplethorpe, Robert Miller Gallery, New York, United States
- Bill Henson, Roslyn Oxley9 Gallery, Sydney, Travelled over Australia

2013

- Cloud Landscapes, Art Gallery of New South Wales, Sydney
- The Youth Code!, Christophe Guye Galerie, Zurich, Switzerland

2014

- Dark Desire, Gippsland Art Gallery

== Books ==
Major monographs on the artist's work:

- Henson, Bill; Keller, Walter; Jaeggi, Martin (2002), Lux et nox (First ed.), Scalo; London : Thames & Hudson, ISBN 978-3-908247-55-5
- Henson, Bill; Annear, Judy; Art Gallery of New South Wales (2004), Henson/Mnemosyne : photographs 1974–2004, Scalo; Sydney : Art Gallery of New South Wales, ISBN 978-0-7347-6361-7
