= Fiona Hall (artist) =

Australian photographer, sculptor (born 1953)

- Born: Fiona Margaret Hall; 16 November 1953 (age 72); Oatley, New South Wales, Australia
- Known for: Photography, Sculpture
- Awards: Officer for the Order of Australia (OA) (2013)

Fiona Margaret Hall, AO (born 16 November 1953) is an Australian artistic photographer and sculptor. Hall represented Australia in the 56th International Art Exhibition at the Venice Biennale in 2015. She is known as "one of Australia's most consistently innovative contemporary artists." Many of her works explore the "intersection of environment, politics and exploitation".

== Early life and education ==
Hall was born to Ruby Payne-Scott, (a pioneer in radiophysics and radio astronomy), and telephone technician William Holman Hall in 1953 and grew up in Oatley, Sydney. Hall's family lived close to Royal National Park and her parents often took her bushwalking on the weekends, encouraging an appreciation of nature that has had a strong influence on her art. She is the younger sister of the mathematical statistician and probabilist Peter Gavin Hall.

Hall attended Oatley West Primary School between 1959 and 1965, and Penshurst High School between 1966 and 1971. Hall's mother recognised her artistic potential and took 14-year-old Hall to see the exhibition Two Decades of American Painting at the Art Gallery of New South Wales, which developed her interest in art. Hall was initially interested in studying architecture, but upon leaving high school she decided to pursue art and studied a Diploma of Painting at the East Sydney Technical College (ESTC) (part of the National Art School). Through participation in the experimental art scene of early 1970s Sydney, where the conventions of modern art were being challenged through the exploration of art forms outside of painting and sculpture, Hall became interested in photography. The ESTC did not offer a major in photography at that time, but her painting teacher John Firth-Smith mentored Hall in photography and she studied it under George Schwarz as a minor for her diploma. While still a student, Hall exhibited photographs as part of the Thoughts and Images: An Exploratory Exhibition of Australian Student Photography group exhibition at the Ewing and George Paton Galleries in 1974. Hall graduated from ESTC in 1975, her graduate exhibition solely featuring photography in lieu of any painting.

== Career ==
=== 1970s ===
After graduating, Hall lived in London, England between January 1976 and August 1978. In the summer of 1976, Hall spent three months travelling around Europe, during which she visited numerous art institutions and gifts two of her photographs with Jean-Claude Lemagny - the Chief Curator of Photography - at the Bibliothèque nationale. Upon her return to London, Hall began working with Peter Turner, editor of Creative Camera, a British photography Magazine. Through this job Hall was introduced to Fay Goodwin, for whom she was an assistant for the remainder of her time in London. Hall held her first solo exhibition in 1977 at London's Creative Camera Gallery. Hall returned to Australia in 1978 to visit her mother, who was ill. In that same year, she displayed her first Australian solo exhibition at Church Street Photography Centre, Melbourne, then moved to the United States to study for a Masters of Fine Arts (MFA) (Photography) at the Visual Studies Workshop in Rochester, New York.

=== 1980s ===
The 1980s saw Hall establishing a significant artistic profile for herself through involvement in several solo and group exhibitions across Australia. As part of her study, Hall returned to Australia in 1981 to live as the artist-in-residence at the Tasmanian School of Art with the support of a grant from the Visual Arts Board of the Australia Council. There, she created The Antipodean Suite with objects such as banana peel and power cords, an early demonstration of a consistent theme in her work, "the transformation of the everyday... into creations of imaginative beauty." Also in 1981, five photographs by Fiona Hall were acquired by the Art Gallery of New South Wales, the first of her works to enter a public collection. Hall graduated with a MFA in 1982, and in the same year participated in the Biennale of Sydney.

In 1983, Hall began lecturing in photo studies at the South Australian School of Art, Adelaide, where she remained until formally resigning in 2002. Between 1984 and 1986, Hall was commissioned to document the new Parliament House of Australia, creating forty-four photographs for the Parliament House Construction Project.

During the 1980s, she created a number of series from everyday objects, including Morality Dolls - The Seven Deadly Sins, cardboard marionettes composed from photocopies of medical engravings; Illustrations to Dante's Divine Comedy, photographs of human figures made from painted and burnished aluminium cans; and Paradisus terrestris, in which Hall "used sardine tins to form exquisite sculptures of botanical specimens which sit on top of the open tin revealing human sexual parts which correspond physically to the attributes of the plant." In 1989, Hall was featured in an SBS television program about Australian photographers, Visual Instincts.

=== 1990s ===
Between June and October 1991, Hall was Artist in Residence at Philip Institute of Technology in Preston, Victoria. For four months over 1992–1993, the National Gallery of Australia hosted an exhibition of Hall's work titled The Garden of Earthly Delights: The Art of Fiona Hall, which included "early field photographs, a sampling from several series of studio photographs, as well as sculpture and ceramics." In the late 1990s, Hall stopped working in the medium of photography, and the photograph of her father, incorporated into her 1996 large-scale installation Give a Dog a Bone, was the last that she exhibited.

In 1997, Hall took leave without pay from the University of South Australia and spent the second half of the year at Canberra School of Art as the Australian National University Creative Arts Fellow. While living in Canberra, Hall planned and designed a commissioned work for the sculpture garden of the National Gallery of Australia. Instead of creating a sculpture for the gallery, as initially planned, Hall created Fern Garden, a 20-square-metre permanent installation of landscape art, opened to the public in 1998. In this same year, she spent the first six months in London at the London Visual Arts/Crafts Board studio, then moved back in Australia as the Artist in Residence at Mt Coot-tha Botanic Gardens (where she created Cash Crop, 1998 (series), part of Fieldwork, 1999), and finally at the South Australian Museum in a series of informal residencies. She spent 1999 in Sri Lanka on an Asialink Lunuganga Residency. Her subsequent work explored further the concepts of history, transporting and transplanting.

In preparation for the Sydney Olympic Games, Hall was commissioned to produce a work, Bloodline, as part The Sydney 2000 Olympic Fine Art Collection at the Art Gallery of New South Wales.

=== 2000s ===
In 2000, Hall was commissioned to create a public artwork in the Royal Botanic Gardens in Sydney and designed Folly for Mrs Macquarie.

In 2005, retrospectives of her work were held at the Queensland Art Gallery and the Art Gallery of South Australia. To coincide with this, the first monograph was published, Fiona Hall, by Piper Press and written by curator Julie Ewington. In the same year, Hall was commissioned to create a piece for the new Chancellery Building of the University of South Australia. In 2008–2009, another retrospective, entitled Force Field, was displayed in Sydney, New South Wales, at the Museum of Contemporary Art, and in New Zealand at the City Gallery, Wellington, and the Christchurch Art Gallery.

=== 2010s ===
In 2015, Hall represented Australia in the 56th International Art Exhibition at the Venice Biennale, with a work entitled Wrong Way Time. This included work created in collaboration with the Tjanpi Desert Weavers, Kuka Irititja (Animals from Another Time) and Tjituru-tjituru (Tragedy, Grief and Sadness), focused on death, extinction and annihilation. The following year, Wrong Way Time was exhibited at the National Gallery of Australia. Hall continues to work with Roslyn Oxley9 Gallery in Sydney, where she has exhibited since 1995.

Wrong Way Time was published by Piper Press in 2015, and in 2019, Hall was commissioned to produce a work for The Hall of Service, Anzac Memorial in Sydney.

== Recognition and awards ==
- 1997: Contempora 5 Art Award, National Gallery of Australia.
- 1998: Appointed to the Advisory Council of the Australian National University's Centre for the Mind.
- 1999: Clemenger Art Award, National Gallery of Victoria.
- 2011: Artist Award in the National Awards for the Visual Arts, Melbourne Art Foundation.
- 2013: Officer (AO) in the general division of the Order Of Australia "for distinguished service to the visual arts as a painter, sculptor and photographer, and to art education".

=== Reviews ===
Famed art curator Betty Churcher AO said of Hall: "With infinite care, the patience of a scientist and the skill of a jeweller, she fashioned each plant and its corresponding human part. Her purpose is very serious but her sense of humour is always ready to bubble to the surface."

== Notable works ==
- The Antipodean Suite, 1981
- Genesis, 1984
- The Seven Deadly Sins, 1984
- Illustrations to 'The Divine Comedy', 1988
- Paradisus terrestris, 1989–1990
- Words, 1990 (series)
- Historia Non-Naturalis, 1991 (series)
- Fruiting Bodies, 1992 (series)
- The Syntax of Flowers, 1992 (series)
- Cargo Cult, 1993
- Medicine Bundle for the Non-Born Child, 1993-1994
- The price is right, 1995
- Occupied Territory, 1995
- Fern Garden, 1998 (commissioned work)
- Global Liquidity, 1998 (exhibition)
- Fieldwork, 1999 (exhibition)
- Paradisus terrestris Entitled/Paradisus terrestris Sri Lanka, 1999 (series)
- Folly for Mrs Macquarie, 2000 (commissioned work)
- Gene pool, 2000
- Leaf Litter, 2000-2003 (series)
- Understorey, 2001-2004 (series)
- Cell Culture, 2001-2002 (series)
- Tender, 2002-2005 (series)
- Snowdomes, 2002-2004 (series)
- Cross Purpose, 2003
- Earth Tones, 2003 (series)
- Scar Tissue, 2003–04
- Mire, 2005
- Fly Away Home, 2010-2012
- Fall Prey, 2012
- Wrong Way Time, 2015

== Notable exhibitions ==
Throughout her artistic career, Hall has been involved in over 150 solo and group exhibitions, the most notable of which are listed below.

=== Group exhibitions ===
- 1974 - Thoughts and Images: An Exploratory Exhibition of Australian Student Photography. Ewing and George Paton Galleries, Sydney.
- 1975 - The Grid Show - A Structured Space. Ewing and Paton Galleries, Sydney.
- 1975 - Six Australian Women Photographers. National Gallery of Victoria, Melbourne; and Australian Centre for Photography, Sydney.
- 1986-7 - In full view: a exhibition of 20x24 Polaroid photographs. Touring exhibition.
- 1987 - Pure invention. Parco Space, Tokyo.
- 1990 - Terminal garden. Adelaide Festival.
- 1991 - Australian Perspecta. Art Gallery of New South Wales, Sydney.
- 1991 - Second nature. Bridgestone Museum of Art, Tokyo.
- 1994 - Biodata. Contemporary Art Centre of South Australia, Adelaide.
- 1996 - Art across oceans. Copenhagen, Denmark.
- 1997 - Perspecta. Art Gallery of New South Wales, Sydney.
- 2000 - Terra Mirabilis/Wonderful Land. Centre for Visual Arts, Cardiff.
- 2001 - Unpacking Europe. Museum Boijmans Van Beuningen, Rotterdam.
- 2003-4 - Face Up: Contemporary Art from Australia. Nationalgalerie im Hamburger Bahnhof, Berlin.
- 2006 - Prism: Contemporary Australian Art. Bridgestone Museum of Art, Tokyo.
- 2009 - The Third Moscow Biennale of Contemporary Art. Moscow.
- 2010 - Bienale of Sydney.
- 2013 - Australia. Royal Academy of Arts, London.
- 2014 - Adelaide Biennial of Art. Art Gallery of South Australia, Adelaide.
- 2016-7 - Creative Accounting. Touring exhibition.
- 2018 - Earth/Sky. National Gallery of Australia, Canberra.

== Publications ==
- 1995 - Subject to change, Piper Press OCLC 37062315
- 1997 - Fiona Hall : Canberra projects OCLC 222157210
- 2005 - Fiona Hall (Monograph), Piper Press
- 2007 - Fiona Hall : force field OCLC 301562576
- 2015 - Wrong Way Time, Piper Press
