= Beatrice Faust =

Australian author and women's activist (1939–2019)

Beatrice Faust AO
- Born: Beatrice Eileen Fennessey; 19 February 1939; Glen Huntly, Victoria, Australia
- Died: 30 October 2019 (aged 80); Churchill, Victoria, Australia
- Education: Mac.Robertson Girls' High School; University of Melbourne
- Occupations: Writer, women's rights activist
- Spouse: Clive Faust
- Partner: Adam (Aimo) Murtonen
- Writing career
- Language: English
- Notable works: Women, Sex and Pornography (1980); Apprenticeship in Liberty (1991)

Beatrice Eileen Faust (19 February 1939 – 30 October 2019) was an Australian author, critic and women's activist. In 1966 she was president of the Victorian Abortion Law Repeal Association. She was a co-founder of the Victorian Council for Civil Liberties in 1966 and of the Women's Electoral Lobby in 1972.

== Early life ==
Beatrice Faust was born Beatrice Eileen Fennessey in Glen Huntly, a suburb of Melbourne, on 19 February 1939. Her mother died shortly after having given birth. This had been predicted by doctors, who knew of a uterine canal anomaly which would lead to such, however being of Roman Catholic and Irish descent the use of contraceptives was denied her parents and subsequently her mother became pregnant.

She was brought up by her father, three aunts and an extended Irish family, her great-grandmother Boule having arrived in Australia in 1848 as a consequence of the Great Famine and father at a later date.

== Education ==
Faust attended Melbourne University in the 1950s, where she became acquainted with Germaine Greer and they extended their feminist inclinations through various cogitations. She earned a bachelor's degree in English and subsequently her master's degree. Much later in her life, the higher degrees of PhD and LLD were conferred upon her, the former for her 1991 book Apprenticeship in Liberty and the latter for her life's work in general, as a social reformist and researcher.

== Feminist ==
Faust was one of the first women to argue for civil liberties, abortion law reform and well-informed sex education for all. In 1966 she co-founded the Victorian Council for Civil Liberties to advocate for civil rights. In February 1972, Faust initiated the formation of the Women's Electoral Lobby (Australia), to agitate for legislative reform along specifically feminist lines and to give Australian women a greater voice in politics.

== Author and critic ==
Among her early writings, she contributed to the Australian edition of The Little Red Schoolbook. During the 1970s, for The Age newspaper, she wrote regularly on films and was a pioneer reviewer of photography and promoted it as an art form; in one of her contributions to Nation Review, Palmer notes her suggestion that "There is no reason why photographs cannot be sold like prints, in numbered editions" and points to her 1973 article in Photography News that "claimed of Jerrems that 'this lass has great potential in becoming one of the most sought-after photographers in Australia'. The comments proved prophetic."

Later, in the late 1980s into the 1990s, she had a regular column in the Weekend Australian, one result of which was a court case involving Jeff Kennett, the then Victorian premier.

== Later life and legacy ==
In the latter part of her career she returned to one of her earliest vocations, as a teacher, becoming a lecturer in English at, first, RMIT, Melbourne, and then Monash University, Victoria, where she widened the scope her concern to include the educational syllabus of Australia on a more general level.

After her retirement she lived in Churchill, a town in Gippsland, Victoria where she died on 30 October 2019.

Judith Brett published her biography of Faust, Fearless Beatrice Faust in 2024.

== Awards ==
In 2001 Faust was awarded the Centenary Medal. In the same year, she was inducted into the Victorian Honour Roll of Women. In 2004 she was appointed an Officer of the Order of Australia for such efforts and more.

== Personal life ==
The first of Beatrice's two marriages was to Clive Faust during her time at university. Having become known as a public figure with the Faust surname, when they later divorced, she retained the name. She had one child, Stephen David, born out of wedlock in 1965 from her relationship with the Finnish academic Adam (Aimo) Murtonen.

== Bibliography ==
=== Books ===
- Women, Sex and Pornography, Penguin Books, Melbourne 1980 ISBN 9780867590012
- Apprenticeship in Liberty, Angus & Robertson, North Ryde NSW 1991 ISBN 9780207157370
- Benzo Junkie: More Than a Case History, Penguin Books, Melbourne 1993 ISBN 9780670851454
- Backlash? Balderdash!, University of New South Wales Press, Sydney NSW 1994 ISBN 978-0-86840-142-3

=== Essays ===
- "The paedophiles", a chapter in the book The Betrayal of Youth – Radical Perspectives on Childhood Sexuality, Intergenerational Sex, and the Social Oppression of Children and Young People; Edited by Warren Middleton; CL Publications, London; 1986
