= Paul Caponigro =

American photographer (1932–2024)

- Born: Paul John Jerome Caponigro; December 7, 1932; Boston, Massachusetts, U.S.
- Died: November 10, 2024 (aged 91); Cushing, Maine, U.S.
- Education: Boston University; California School of Fine Arts
- Occupations: Photographer, writer, pianist
- Years active: 1950s–2024
- Spouse: Eleanor Morris (div. 1976)
- Children: John Paul

Paul John Jerome Caponigro (December 7, 1932 – November 10, 2024) was an American photographer, writer and pianist. His best known photographs are Running White Deer and Galaxy Apple. His subject matter includes landscape and still life, taking an interest in natural forms. He was best known for his landscape works and for the mystical and spiritual qualities of his work.

In 2001, Caponigro was awarded the Royal Photographic Society's Centenary Medal and Honorary Fellowship (HonFRPS) in recognition of a sustained, significant contribution to the art of photography. His work is held in the collections of the Metropolitan Museum of Art, Museum of Fine Arts, Houston, Museum of Modern Art, and San Francisco Museum of Modern Art.

== Early life ==
Paul John Jerome Caponigro was born in Boston on December 7, 1932, to Italian immigrant parents, and started having interests in photography at age 13. However, he also had a strong passion in music and began to study music at Boston University College of Music in 1950, before eventually deciding to focus on studying photography at the California School of Fine Arts.

== Photography career ==
Caponigro studied with Minor White. His first one-man exhibition took place at the George Eastman House in 1958. In the 1960s Caponigro taught photography part-time at Boston University while consulting for the Polaroid Corporation on various technical research. In 1971, his work was exhibited in the group exhibition Le Groupe Libre Expression : Expo 5, presented by Jean-Claude Gautrand, at the Rencontres d'Arles festival in Arles, France.

He died on November 10, 2024 at his home in Cushing, Maine from congestive heart failure at the age of 91.

== Personal life ==
Caponigro lived in El Rancho de San Sebastian during his time in New Mexico from 1973 to 1993. Caponigro was a dedicated pianist and considered his training with music to be essential to his photographic imagery.

His son, John Paul Caponigro, is a digital photographic artist. He was married to writer Eleanor Morris until their divorce in 1976.

== Books ==
- Landscape. New York: McGraw-Hill, 1975. ISBN 978-0-07-009780-3.
- The Wise Silence. New York Graphic Society Books; Little, Brown, 1983. ISBN 978-0-8212-1548-7.
- Megaliths. Boston: Little, Brown, 1986. ISBN 0-8212-1616-3.
- New England Days. Portland Museum of Art, 2002. ISBN 978-1-56792-216-5.

== Awards ==
- Three grants from the NEA
- 1966: Guggenheim Fellowship
- 1975: Guggenheim Fellowship
- 2001: Royal Photographic Society's Centenary Medal and Honorary Fellowship (HonFRPS)

== Collections ==
Caponigro's work is held in the following permanent collections:

- Carnegie Art Museum, Oxnard, California: 2 prints (as of 26 November 2024)
- Metropolitan Museum of Art, New York: 14 prints (as of 26 November 2024)
- Museum of Fine Arts, Houston: 30 prints (as of 26 November 2024)
- Museum of Modern Art, New York: 20 prints (as of 26 November 2024)
- New Mexico Museum of Art, Santa Fe, New Mexico
- Norton Simon Museum, Pasadena, California: 1 print (as of 26 November 2024)
- San Francisco Museum of Modern Art, San Francisco: 4 prints (as of 26 November 2024)
- Solomon R. Guggenheim Museum, New York
- Whitney Museum of American Art, New York
