= John Cato =

Australian photographer and teacher

John Chester Cato
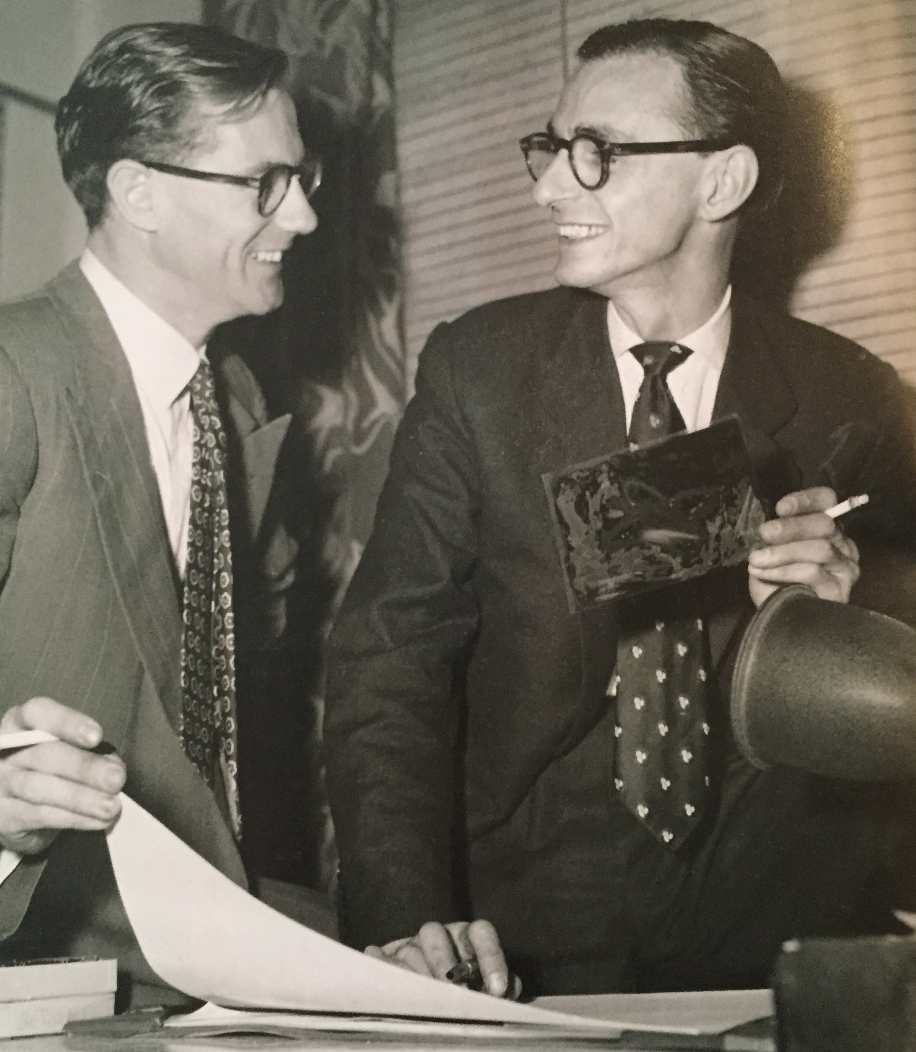
- John Cato and Athol Shmith c. 1955
- Born: 2 November 1926; Hobart, Tasmania, Australia
- Died: 30 January 2011 (aged 84); Bonbeach, Victoria, Australia
- Occupations: Photographer and teacher
- Spouse: Dawn Cato (m. 7 October 1950)
- Relatives: Jack Cato (father)

John Chester Cato (2 November 1926 – 30 January 2011) was an Australian photographer and teacher. Cato started his career as a commercial photographer and later moved towards fine-art photography and education. Cato spent most of his life in Melbourne, Australia.

== Photography career ==
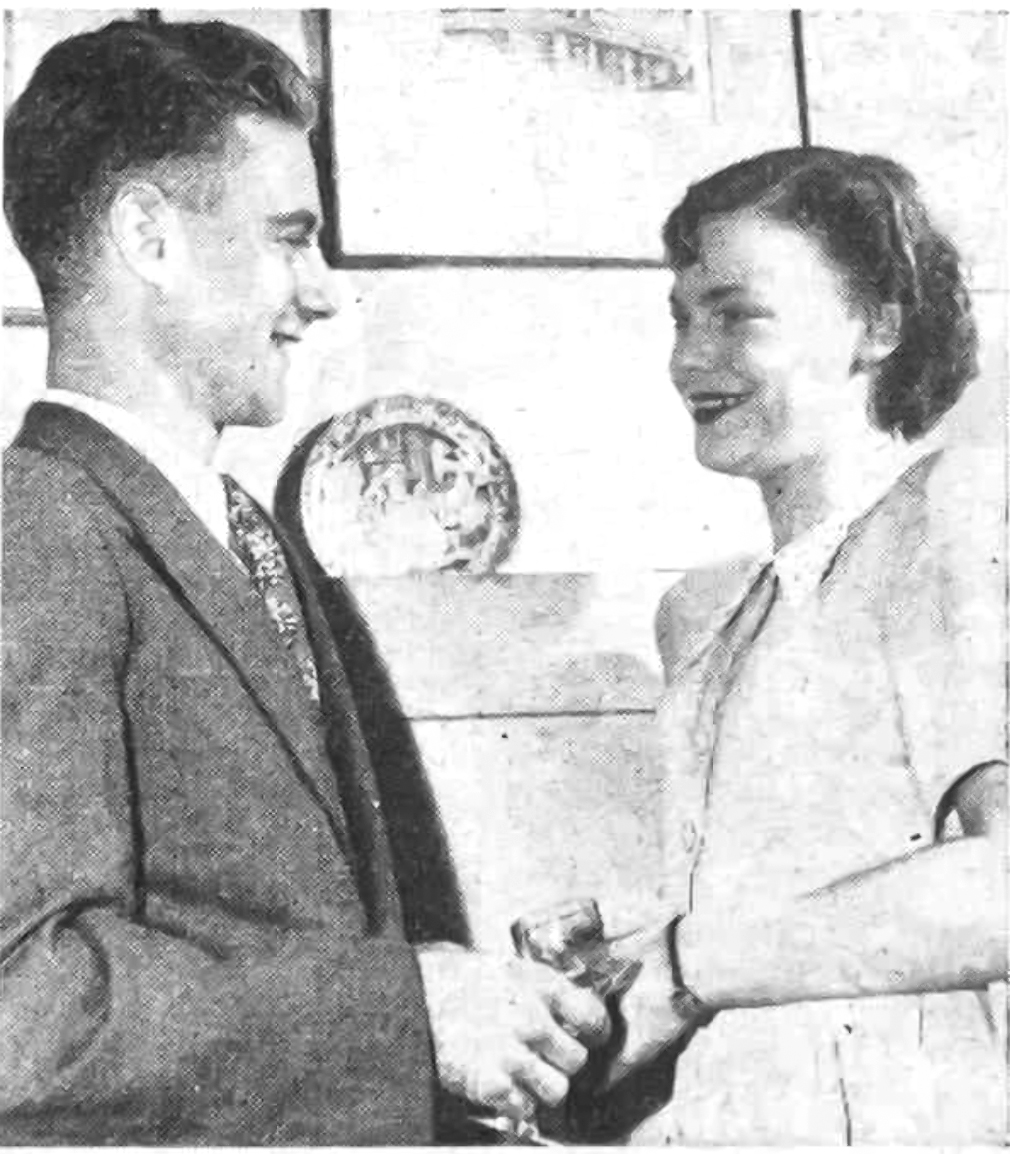
John Cato and fiancee, Dawn Cadwallader

John Chester Cato was born on November 2, 1926, in Hobart, Tasmania, to Mary Booth and John (Jack) Cato.

His career in photography started at the age of 12 as an apprentice to his father, Jack Cato. Returning in 1946 after service in the Pacific for the Royal Australian Navy during WW2, Cato worked as a self-employed photographer before being hired by The Argus as a press photographer in 1947.

Cato held that position until 1950 when he became a photographer and assistant for Athol Shmith Pty Ltd. in the Rue de la Paix building at 125 Collins Street, Melbourne. He married Dawn Helen Cadwallader of Brighton at the register at St. Mary's Church of England, East Caulfield, in October that year. Their eldest son, also John, was born in 1952.

During this period he undertook research for his father Jack on the latter's The Story of the Camera in Australia published in 1955. That year, Cato and Shmith became business partners and started Athol Shmith–John Cato Pty Ltd.

When the MoMA's The Family of Man exhibition came to Melbourne's Preston Motors Show Room on February 23, 1959, Cato visited the show several times and was inspired by its humanist themes and optimism.

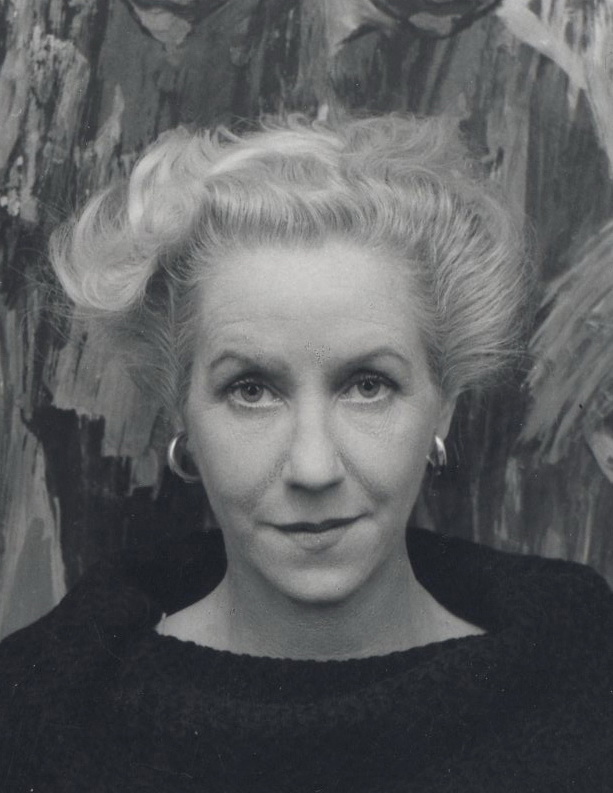
Elizabeth Durack, 1961, by John Cato

The partners' business was prospering and at times employed 26 staff and hired other photographers including Norman Ikin and Hans Hasenpflug to cope with the volume of business. By 1958 they were known so well by the public that their portraits could be used to endorse a television brand in its advertising. Cato's clients included U.S.P. Benson Pty. Ltd., Worth Hosiery, Myer, Hammersley Iron Pty Ltd, The Australian Ballet, Southern Cross Hotel and General Motors, and his fashion photography occupied full pages of newspapers and magazines.

Nevertheless Cato moved away from commercial photography in 1974 after experiencing what he described as "a kind of menopause". Shortly after leaving his partnership with Athol Shmith, Cato began his teaching career and started to focus on fine art photography. Cato was one of the first photographers in Melbourne to give up their commercial practice to become a fine art photographer.

== Fine art photography ==
In 1970, four years before leaving his commercial practice, Cato began exploring photography as an art form. His fine art photography drew connections between humanity and the environment, exploring a different theme in each photo essay.

Cato made 'straight' (directly imaged) landscape photographs usually with large or medium-format cameras in order to "explore the elements of the landscape", usually enhancing these in printing. Over a ten-year period, Cato spent two years at a time focusing on a particular symbolic theme in the Australian landscape, often spending a large amount of time in the wilderness observing the conditions and waiting for the perfect opportunity. He would often wait and contemplate a scene for days before finally pressing the shutter when the moment was right. Cato's work was deeply considered and clearly showed his unique perspective on the natural elements around us.

"The meeting of land and sea has always held a mystic fascination for me. Through my camera, my experience of it has been heightened, my awareness of its wonder deepened. Above all, I remember its clamorous silence."

— John Cato 1976

Cato used symbolism in his work, the consciously constructed image being an interest among 1970s photographers, young and experienced, including his colleague Paul Cox.

The question of the status of photography as an art form was being resolved during this decade; Lynne Warren writes "The creative uses of photography expanded considerably in the 1970s. The medium began to be absorbed into the mainstream art world as conceptual and performance artists started to employ the medium. For body artist Stelarc, photographs were an important creative adjunct to his art events in the 1970s. In a different vein, Jon Rhodes was one of several photographers of the period to address social issues when he used the medium to bring attention to land rights issues for Aboriginal people in the Gove Peninsula in his series, Just Another Sunrise? Others, such as John Cato and Les Walkling, explored the metaphoric potential of photography.

Cinematographer Nino Martinetti, one of Cato's past students, said "Look carefully at John Cato's simple photographs of rocks, branches, trees, bark, sand, water and reflections… is that reality? Yes, but not as many people see it. This is the fine line where the art of photography and reality stand, where the artist captures an emotion for us to share and interpret."

Cato's personal work was described as "a reflection of the psyche, not of light, that allows a consciousness to be present in the figuration of the photographic prints. The personal work is an expression of his self, his experience, his story and his language." Gallery director Rebecca Hossack, who showed his work in her London gallery in 2002, reports that;

Cato is not content to see himself merely as an 'artist' or a 'photographer.' He describes himself – in his beliefs – as an 'animist':

"I believe that rocks have souls just as much as people. I think the word that has been used about my work which pleases me the most, is ... Elemental, and it is that element of life within the landscape that to some is a deep religious experience."

It is a vision that he traces back to the mythology of the Ancient Greeks, but it has interesting resonances, too, with the beliefs of the Australian aboriginals and the practice of their art.

=== Earth Song ===
Earth Song was Cato's first collection of personal work to be exhibited. This series consisted of 52 colour photographs sequenced in a way that allowed the work to be recognised as individual photographs and as part of an overall concept. Cato's use of musical analogies can be seen in the sequencing of Earth Song, described as using "melodic line and symphonic form as its metaphoric basis".

Cato's Earth Song was included at the National Gallery of Victoria over 12–31 October 1971 as part of the Frontiers exhibition of six photographers who were exploring the idea of the medium as an art form with Peter Medlen, Stan Ostoja-Kotkowski, Mark Strizic and John Wilkins. The Department of Foreign Affairs toured the exhibition through Manila, Seoul, Tokyo, Kuala Lumpur, Singapore and Bangkok. Cato's sequence went on to Horsham Art Gallery 14 December 1974 – 30 January 1975 for his first solo exhibition.

=== Essay 1: Landscapes in a Figure ===
For Cato's first photographic essay described as such, he completed five black and white photo sequences between 1971 and 1979. In each sequence, Cato explored the expression of nature and creation, which he saw as the physical representation of his own life experiences and philosophy.

Series title	Number of photographs	Produced between
Tree – A Journey	18 images	1971–1973
Petroglyphs	14 images	1971–1973
Seawind	14 images	1971–1975
Proteus	18 images	1974–1977
Waterway	16 images	1974–1979

=== Essay 2: Figures in a Landscape ===
In the 1982 assessment of Age critic Geoff Strong, Essay 2 is the "stuff of social comment" compared to other work, and focuses on "the sublimation of Aboriginal culture by Europeans". This series explores the idea of destruction of culture, spirituality and physicality using duality to represent the idea photographically.

"Cato saw that even as they are part of the whole, the duality of positive/negative, black/white, masculine/feminine are always in conflict."

— John Cato: Retrospective

Series title	Number of photographs	Produced between
Alcheringa	11 images	1978–1981
Broken Spears	11 images	1978–1983
Mantracks	22 images (in pairs)	1978–1983

=== Double Concerto: An Essay in Fiction ===
Double Concerto was Cato's final photo essay. This photo essay was published under the deliberately androgynous 'Everyman' names Pat Noone and Chris Noone, two identities that Cato created to "visualise alternative conditions within himself". Each sequence, one monochrome single images and the other in full colour montages, explored how individual people can witness and experience the world very differently from each other. This series was exhibited as Cato's "farewell show" at Luba Bilu Gallery in Greville St. Prahran on his retirement from teaching.

"For the truth of the matter is that people have mixed feelings and confused opinions and are subject to contradictory expectations and outcomes, in every sphere of experience."

— John Cato: Retrospective

Series title	Number of photographs	Produced between
Pat Noone	30 images	1984–1990
Chris Noone	11 images	1985–1991

== Teaching career ==
Cato began his teaching career in 1974 at Prahran College of Advanced Education which became known as Melbourne's most innovative art school, where he worked full-time. In 1975 however, government funding ended with Whitlam's dismissal. He took up a position at Roger Hayne's newly established Impact School of Photography before being again offered work at Prahran later in 1975. Until 1979 Cato taught part-time and then took over as Head of Photography when Athol Shmith retired due to ill health in 1980, and remained in the role until the last year of Art & Design at Prahran, 1991 when at 65 he was forced, reluctantly, to retire.

Between 1977 and 1979 Cato also contributed to the foundation of Photography Studies College from the Impact school, and concurrently lectured there until becoming full-time head of the photography department at Prahran. Cato was a passionate and generous teacher and was highly regarded by his students and peers. He described himself as being "duty bound" to share his experience with students and colleagues, and they benefitted from his close knowledge of the history of Australian photography attained as he assisted his father in research for The Story of the Camera in Australia, and in meeting its protagonists.

Many of Cato's past students have gone on to hold well regarded positions in the photography, art and education fields and as Deborah Ely notes "the department produced some of the country's most acclaimed practitioners", including Bill Henson, Carol Jerrems, Steve Lojewski, Rozalind Drummond, Janina Green, Andrew Chapman, Phil Quirk, Jacqueline Mitelman, Polly Borland, Susan Fereday, Robert Ashton, Peter Milne, Leonie Reisberg, Paul Torcello, Stephen Wickham, Kate Williams, daughter of artist Fred Williams, and Christopher Koller among others. Henson, who regarded Cato as "very generous and enthusiastic", was inspired by his use of musical analogies, which Henson later incorporated in his own work. Courtney Pedersen who has since become a senior academic, describes her learning from Cato as 'formative'.

Paul Cox, one of Cato's colleagues at Prahran College of Advanced Education, remarked that while the staff of Cato's department were photographers, none of them were qualified teachers; "Can you imagine that happening today? … At Prahran, teachers and students learnt from each other. It was an exchange."

Cato preferred to use large and medium format cameras in his own work for the higher resolution that they offered and when taking students on excursions, he insisted they use the same instead of 35mm SLR cameras that they more commonly used, so that the more technical view camera would force students to think before they pressed the shutter and pre-visualise their photograph, rather than to 'blaze away' with expendable roll film. Cato strongly believed in photography as a form of individualised expressionism, a view that was shared and supported by Athol Shmith, who was one of the first to teach photography as a creative course in the late 1960s.

Associate Professor Noel Hutchinson dedicated the Prahran Fine Art Graduate Show 1991 catalogue 'in memoriam' to Cato in recognition of his retirement. In the following year Prahran College was subsumed into the Victorian College of the Arts, formerly the National Gallery of Victoria Art School, and Christopher Koller, one of Cato's former students, was made head of its photography department, inheriting his mentor's belief in the importance of conceptualisation and previsualisation in the medium.

== Exhibitions and galleries ==
Cato exhibited his work with other photographers in 30 group exhibitions until 2003, the earliest being in 1964 at Blaxland Gallery in Sydney, and in 20 solo exhibitions in Australian and international galleries before his death in 2011. The 1973 Frontiers at the NGV with Stan Ostoja-Kotkowski, Mark Strizic, Peter Medlen and John Wilkins toured to the Australian Embassy in Bangkok, June 27– July 5 and showed at Abraxas Gallery, Manuka, in December 1974 with Sue Ford, Les Gray and Mark Strizic. Cato's first solo exhibition was held at Horsham Regional Art Gallery (Victoria, Australia) in 1975, with subsequent solo exhibitions being held every few years up until 2004.

Cato's work is held in numerous gallery collections across Australia including the National Gallery of Australia, the National Gallery of Victoria, Horsham Regional Art Gallery, Albury Regional Art Gallery, Deakin University, Tasmanian Art Gallery and Melbourne State College. In addition to Australian galleries, Cato's work is also held in collections in the Bibliotheque Nationale in Paris and Schmidtbank Weiden in Germany.

Paul Cox and Bryan Gracey, colleagues at Prahran College, co-curated the first retrospective of Cato's black and white landscape photographs taken between 1971 and 1991 which they exhibited at the 2013 Ballarat International Foto Biennale, both believing that Cato's work deserves to be better recognised. Paul Cox commented; "John will ride a high wave. He belongs in the National Gallery, in the high echelons and I think this is a very wonderful first step."

== Critical reception ==
The first substantial review of Cato's work was negative; art historian and academic Patrick McCaughey described the inaugural exhibition of the National Gallery's newly established photography department as 'optimistic' but panned the works of Stan Ostoja-Kotkowski, Mark Strizic, Peter Medlen and John Wilkins, and Cato's first display of fine art imagery, as "a combined blow to the aspiration of photography as a serious art," regarding "their aspiration to art [as] tepid pastiches of the more available and familiar modernist manners." He went on to single out Cato's wall-mounted sequence of colour prints (a novel display lit successively with timed strobes to indicate their sequence);

Nobody outdoes John Cato in sententiousness, however, except the writer of the catalogue. Noguchi, Arp, Dubuffet are all pastiched in Cato's Earth Song series. But images here are nought to the words accompanying the photos:

Unwisdomed knowledge
Power unrestrained,
these wean man
from his mother's breast

"Never to mention Farex" quipped McCaughey, who then critiqued...

The aping of pictorial formulae [that] makes the photographer look homeless and uncertain in his art, depending on other media to establish that his photographs are "real art". These five mistake the modesty of the great photographers – Walker Evans, Cartier Bresson, Brassai, Stieglitz – for lack of ambition within the medium. They compound that mistake by substituting pretension for innovation, inflation for experiment. All, one feels, would be better off with a box brownie and their local chemist to develop and print.

A year later Ray Davie included reference to the show in an article on the National Gallery photography department, remarking that Frontiers, then about to tour Asia, was "not offensively Australian," not taken to show "our neighbours...flora and fauna," but "concerned with art rather than propaganda." He refers to Cato's 52 colour panels as a sole example, their "natural forms" intended "to give an unfolding narrative of life and nature's eternal re-creation."

Nancy Borlase reviewing sections from Cato's essays in Sydney in 1976 found herself;

...brought face to face, at the Australian Centre for Photography, with the brooding mysteriousness of John Cato's Petroglyphs, and the naked imagery of decay, in his odyssey of a tree's journey ... Cato's photographs reveal the truth behind the facade of outward appearances, as few other art forms can. They are less reflections. of nature, or of man's imprint upon nature, than powerfully expressive statements about nature, and about her spiritual sway over man, in the miraculously stacked stones of his Petroglyphs. The harsh textures, knotty distortions and dramatic chiaroscuro effects which Cato captures in his trees and rocks give way, in his Sea-Wind Series, to a more lyrical and softly sensuous imagery, that in the textural contrasts of air, sand, water, shells and sinuous. slippery seaweed, is no less truthful.

Ruth Faerber, comparing his work with that of co-exhibitor Laurie Wilson at the same show, noted Cato's "dramatic and expansive themes"; "the sweeping movement of wind, the growth pattern in the cross-section of a tree trunk," and in 1979, of his solo show at AGNSW commented that his "textures of trees. rocks and weathered surfaces take on a graphic surrealist" quality.

Cato showed again at the Australian Centre for Photography in a group show Time Present and Time Past: Part II in 1984, and Mark Hinderaker, in The Sydney Morning Herald remarked that; "John Cato, Melbourne's master landscape photographer, is represented by two studies of natural form that at first glance seem reminiscent of Edward Weston: in one, tree branches emerge from water and a sandy bottom and, in the other, branches rise from Earth's cracked crust. Together these two remind us of the extreme conditions in nature and of the struggle of organisms to survive; as well, the branches emerge from the planar surfaces like objects (in the photograph's illusion of depth) emerge from the surface of flat paper."

In a review of Cato's 1997 retrospective at The Photographers' Gallery, The Age reviewer Freda Freiberg noted his achievements;

Cato has made an inestimable contribution to photography in this state as a teacher. As an artist he has pursued an intense engagement with nature—with trees, rocks and skies. He studies, anatomises, magnifies and glorifies the manifold designs and patterns of creation. The social world is absent—except in the Mantracks series, where graffiti on rocks and debris on trees signify the disfiguring effects of an imported culture. But even here, Cato is less social critic than contemplative observer. He finds perfect objective correlatives to his private inner states in the darkness and light, solidity ad softness, and infinite variety of pattern in tree trunks, clouds and rock faces.

In the 2013 Ballarat International Foto Biennale guide, Cato was described as being "underrated" and "far ahead of his time".

Paul Cox, in whose 1987 film Vincent Cato appears, said the following in an article for The Australian:

He was a dreamer. I always adored him. John had a wonderful heart; he was tender for a man. You know you don't know many people like that."

In his autobiography, Cox assures his readers that Cato " will one day be recognised as one of the true greats in the art of photography."

Nevertheless, Cato was known for being a modest photographer who never intended fame for himself or his work, which was its own reward. Consequently, and from a strong dislike of publicity, Cato issued his final work under pseudonyms, characteristically exhibiting his valedictory exhibition as 'Pat and Chris Noone'. Paul Cox confirmed that "Ego is always the biggest limitation of an artist, but John had no ego. He was a free man." Isobel Crombie, head photography curator at the National Gallery of Victoria, shared Cox's opinion and said "He was different in that he did not have the huge ego of some of his contemporaries."

Melissa Miles, writing in 2015 places Cato amongst John Kauffmann, Cecil Bostock, Olive Cotton, Max Dupain, Laurence Le Guay, Richard Waldendorp, David Moore and Grant Mudford who "together represent the broad sweep of abstraction from the steely industrial shapes associated with the straight style to the images aimed at capturing movement and the organic and unruly images derived from nature."

== Exhibitions ==
=== Solo ===
- 1975 Horsham Art Gallery (Victoria)
- 1975, to 27 April: Trees and Rocks, elsewhere titled Exporations, co-exhibited with Laurie Wilson. National Gallery of Victoria, Melbourne
- 1976, 17 February–13 March: From the Land, joint exhibition with Laurie Wilson, Australian Centre for Photography (NSW)
- 1976 Gallery School of Photographic Art (Victoria)
- 1977, 25 August – 18 September: John Cato Photographers' Gallery (Melbourne)
- 1979, to 29 March, Essay : Photographs by John Cato, Art Gallery of New South Wales (Sydney)
- 1979, to 14 September, Waterway, Church Street Centre for Photography
- 1980 McClelland Gallery (Victoria)
- 1982, April: Essay II : Figures in Landscape. Prahran College of Advanced Education gallery
- 1984 Iwalewahaus, Bayreuth University (Germany)
- 1985 Australian Centre for Photography (NSW)
- 1991, 21 June–11 July: Double Concerto: descriptions by Chris and Pat Noone – an essay in fiction by John Cato. Luba Bilu Gallery, Victoria
- 1992 Horsham Art Gallery, Victoria
- 1993 Albury Regional Art Centre (NSW)
- 1995 Iwalewahaus, Bayreuth University
- 1997, 27 March–13 April: John Cato Retrospective. Photographers' Gallery (Victoria)
- 2002 Rebecca Hossack Gallery, London
- 2004 Wilderness Gallery (Cradle Mountain N.P. Centre) Tasmania
- 2004 Kunst Keller, Cologne
- 2013, 17 August–15 September: John Cato : Retrospective, Ballarat International Foto Biennale

=== Group ===
- 1964, June: 20 professional photographers: John Hearder, Clive Kane, Eric Bierre, Bruce Minnett, John Nisbett, Max Dupain, John Leighton, Laurie Le Guay, David Moore, Rob Hillier, Wendy Clayton, Brian Hart, Geoffrey Lee, Paul Trenoweth, Hal Missingham, David Mist and Maurice O'Connell all from Sydney with Athol Shmith, John Cato and Wolfgang Sievers from Melbourne. Blaxland Gallery, Sydney
- 1964 Gallery 'A' Melbourne
- 1971 Frontiers: John Cato, Peter Medlin, Joseph Stanislaus Ostoja-Kotkowski, Mark Strizic and John Wilkins. National Gallery of Victoria
- 1972–73 Touring exhibition of Frontiers retitled Some Australian Experimental Photography to New Zealand, Tokyo, Manila and Kuala Lumpur
- 1974, 23 November–15 December with Sue Ford, Les Gray and Mark Strizic, 'Abraxas' Gallery, Manuka, Canberra
- 1975 Museum and Art Gallery of Tasmania, Hobart
- 1975–76 Touring Exhibition (India, Africa, etc)
- 1976 1977 Victorian College of the Arts Gallery
- 1979 Antiquarian Booksellers, Melbourne
- 1979, 25 May – 24 June: Benefit Exhibition. Photographers: Greg Wayn, Brett Weston, Les Walkling, Paul Caponigro, Edna Bullock, Wynn Bullock, Aaron Siskind, John Cato, Ralph Gibson, Robert Besanko, Boone Morrison. Photographers' Gallery, Melbourne
- 1982 Church Street Photographic Centre (Victoria)
- 1982, to 17 May: with Harry Callahan, John Divola, Aaron Siskind, Robert Besanko, Francis Busby, Tony Perry, Tim Handfield, William Heimerman, Carol Jerrems, Steven Lojewski, Henry Talbot, Les Walkling. Pitspace gallery, Phillip Institute of Technology
- 1983 City of Waverley Art Centre (Victoria)
- 1984 Camden (NSW) Art Centre
- 1984, November–December: Time Present and Time Past: Part II, Australian Centre for Photography (NSW)
- 1986 National Gallery of Victoria, Melbourne
- 1987 Patra Gallery, Melbourne
- 1988 Australian Centre of Contemporary Art,
- 1988 Melbourne, National Gallery of Australia,
- 1988 Canberra, National Gallery of Victoria, Melbourne
- 1989 Blaxland Gallery, Melbourne
- 1992 Victorian Centre for Photography
- 1993 Daimaru Gallery, Melbourne (Australian Conservation Foundation)
- 1995, April–6 May: Likeness: 46 photographs from the Waverley City Gallery collection, curated by Susan Fereday. Centre for Contemporary Photography, Fitzroy
- 1996, 7–24 November: 20th Anniversary Exhibition Ralph Gibson, Ian Lobb, Marcus Bunyan, Harry Callahan, Christopher Koller, Aaron Siskind, Gayle Slater, Paul Caponigro, Francis Busby, Hans Namuth, Les Walkling, Lisette Model, Greg Elms, Larry Clark, Kylie Hamill, Wyn Bullock, Rosemary McKeoun, William Clift, Jeff Busby, Duane Michals, Rennie Ellis, Karen Rawady, Edouard Boubat, Carol Jerrems, Eikoh Hosoe, John Cato, Peter Leiss, William Eggleston, Robert Besanko, Paul Nadalin, John Divola, Colin Vickery, Eliot Porter, Warren Brenninger, Emmet Gowin, Bill Henson. Photographers' Gallery, Melbourne.
- 1995 Victorian Centre for Photography
- 1997, April–11 May: 100 Years of Australian Photography, City of Waverley Art Centre (Victoria), and touring
- 2001: Phiction : lies, illusion and the phantasm in photography : stories, truth or fiction?. Horsham Regional Art Gallery and touring 11 metro and regional galleries
- 2003 Brighton University United Kingdom

== Collections ==
- Bibliothèque nationale de France (Paris)
- National Gallery of Australia
- National Gallery of Victoria
- National Library of Australia
- Tasmanian Museum and Art Gallery (Hobart)
- Swinburne Institute of Technology, Melbourne
- University of Melbourne Archives, Una née Woolf Fraser collection
- Monash Gallery of Art
- Horsham Art Gallery
- Murray Art Museum Albury
- Deakin University

Aside from staging his own exhibitions, Cato was instrumental in the acceptance of photography into the mainstream art establishment. After considerable lobbying by Shmith and others a separate Department of Photography had been established at the National Gallery of Victoria (NGV) in Melbourne. Cato served on an advisory group formed in 1969 during the establishment of the gallery's new Photography Department and oversaw the appointment of the first curator of photography in Australia, Jennie Boddington in 1972.

== Publications ==
- Cato, Jack (1970). John Cato: Proteus. South Yarra: Light Quest Publications. OCLC 226145288.
- Boddington, Jennie (1975). Exploration : an exhibition of photographs by John Cato and Laurie Wilson. Melbourne: National Gallery of Victoria. OCLC 935605193.
- Photographs by John Cato Wolfgang Sievers and Mark Strizic 1955–75. Catalogue of an exhibition held Apr. 2 – June 19, 1988. Aspects of Victorian photography. Melbourne: National Gallery of Victoria. 1988. OCLC 84412702.

== Honorary appointments ==
Over his career, Cato was active in national and international networking amongst the photographic and art education fields. He filled a number of honorary roles including one that was a request by Prahran graduates Euan McGillivray, the Curator of Photography at the Science Museum of Victoria, and Matthew Nickson, who worked at the Photography Department at RMIT, to chair the landmark conference 'Working Papers On Photography' (WOPOP) Australian Photography Conference, held at Prahran College of Advanced Education, Melbourne, from 19–21 September 1980.

- 1969–76 Photography Advisor, National Gallery of Victoria
- 1976 Consultant for Grant Selection, Australia Council
- 1977–80 Executive Council, Australian Centre for Photography
- 1977–87 Honours Executive and Juror, Institute of Australian Photography
- 1978–79 Course Advisor, Victorian College of the Arts
- 1978–82 International Advisory Board, History of Photography (Pennsylvania State University)
- 1979 Executive Council, Australian Photography Educational Council
- 1980 Course Advisor, Bendigo College of Advanced Education
- 1980–82 Advisor, City of Waverley Art Collection
- 1981 Chairman, Australian Photography Education Council
- 1982 Chairman, WOPOP Photography Conference
- 1981–91 Course Advisor and External Assessor, Photography Studies College, Melbourne
- 1982 Researcher and curator 'Jack Cato' a Retrospective Exhibition
- 1985–86 Foundation Member and Steering Committee, and Design, Victoria College Victoria Centre for Photography
- 1987–89 Advisory Board, Victorian Centre for Photography

== Awards ==
Cato was honoured with numerous awards including Fellow at the Australian Institute of Professional Photographers (1991) and Honorary Doctor of Arts at RMIT University (1999). He was also awarded two grants, one a Visual Arts Board Travel Grant in 1985 and the other a Research and Development Grant from Victoria College in 1990.

- 1962 Associate Australian Institute of Photography
- 1978 Honorary Fellow, Australian Institute of Photography
- 1985 $2,000 Visual Arts Board Travel Grant, towards airfare to exhibit work in Bayreuth, West Germany
- 1990 Research and Development Grant, Victoria College
- 1991 Fellow, Australian Institute of Professional Photography
- 1999 Honorary Doctor of Arts, RMIT University
