= Paul Torcello =

Australian advertising photographer (1954–2021)

Paul Renato Torcello (31 October 1954, Trieste – 5 November 2021, Melbourne) was an advertising photographer based in Melbourne and who worked throughout Australasia, Europe and most recently in China.

== Early life and education ==
Paul Renato Torcello was born in Trieste, Italy and migrated with his family to Australia. After traveling and living in the Middle East and Europe he studied visual art at Caulfield Institute. He enrolled next at Prahran College, in the subjects sculpture, painting and photography, under sculptor David Wilson, photographers Athol Shmith, John Cato and filmmaker Paul Cox and, deciding to specialise in photography, completed his qualifications at Photography Studies College. In 1986 he exhibited early commercial work at The Photographers' Gallery.

== Advertising photographer ==
Torcello started assisting photographer Robert Imhoff at The Lighthouse in Prahran. He had early recognition in 1986 being awarded Advertising Photographer of the Year by the Australian Institute of Professional Photography for his advertising photograph of the Ansett International Hotel, Perth. Eventually he set up his own studio, Torcello Photography, at 5 Broomfield Road, Hawthorn East, specialising in studio still-life at first, then advertising fashion.

His client list included American Express, Beverly Wilshire, BHP, Trenitalia, Grand Hyatt Hong Kong, Land Rover, China Airlines, Hayman Island Resort, Bollé sunglasses, Schiaparelli, Timberland, SHELL, ANZ Bank, Piaggio, Mitsubishi, Esanda, Converse Shoes, Singapore Tourist Commission, Le Meridien (Hong Kong), Rothschild Bank Winterthur, Vodafone, Qantas, Levis, Vidal Sassoon, Mazda, Dove Hair Products, ESPN, Gordon’s Gin, Alitalia, Yamaha, Swatch, Banca San Paolo (Italy), Elders, Melbourne Water, Mercedes, Microsoft, Miele (Italy), Qantas, Visa, VLine, Adidas, Tourism Australia, Pure, 3AW, South Australia Tourist Commission, Motor Accident Commission, Nike, Neil Pryde wetsuits, and M&C Saatchi, Melbourne - posters for the Save the Children Campaign 2009, Lenovo, China (from March 2012), and National Australia Bank (2011) He was represented by Collective Force, and Sarah Hew Agency, and by other agents in New Zealand and Europe.

The awarding in 2006 of a contract to depict Australian landscapes for Tourism Australia to a UK photographer Pete Seaward caused a scandal in advertising circles and was a cause taken up in parliament by the Shadow Minister for Primary Industries, Resources, Forestry and Tourism Martin Ferguson MP, who remarked that "The choice overlooks internationally recognised local photographers including Paul Torcello..."

His work from 2017 in China included a commission to photograph actress Maggie Cheung.

== Services to industry ==
Judge for the 43rd and 44th Annual Adelaide Advertising and Design Club Awards.

== Death ==
Torcello died on 5 November 2021 and his memorial service was held on 23 November 2021 at St John's Anglican Church, Camberwell where he was a Parish Council Member. In place of floral tributes, donations were made to the Save The Children Fund for which he had photographed.

== Awards ==
- 1986: Advertising Photographer of the Year, Australian Institute of Professional Photography
- 1987: Work accepted by the International Museum of Photography, part of a permanent exhibit 'Photography for Advertising: The history of a modern art form.'
- 1987: International Advertising Association award, London
- 1987: Silver, Melbourne Advertising and Design Club
- 1987: Gold, Adelaide Advertising and Design Club
- 1988: Bronze, Melbourne Advertising and Design Club
- 1988: IAA, New York
- 1989: Silver and Bronze, Melbourne Advertising and Design Club
- 1990: Gold, Brisbane Advertising and Design Club
- 1991: CAA, Singapore
- 1991: Bronze, Melbourne Advertising and Design Club
- 1994 The Australian Commercial and Media Photographers (ACMP) Collection
- 1995: The Australian Commercial and Media Photographers (ACMP) Collection
- 1995: Möbius
- 1995: Communication Arts
- 1996: The Australian Commercial and Media Photographers (ACMP) Collection
- 1997: Möbius
- 1998: IAA, New York
- 1998: Möbius
- 2000: Gold Award, Advertising Life Series, Association of Photographers 17th Awards

== Publications ==
- Tall Buildings of Asia & Australia. (2001). Austria: Images Pub.
- The Australian Photographers Collection. (1993). Austria: Craftsman House. p. 46, 48
- Australian Photographers: Collection Vol 3 (1995). Austria: Craftsman House. 24, 26, 27
- Art Directors' Index to Photographers (1988). Switzerland: RotoVision S. A..
- The Art of Persuasion (Abrams)
- Commercial and Industrial Photography magazine, Australia
- Professional Photography magazine, Australia
- Photo International (France)
- Communication Arts Annual (USA).

== Exhibitions ==
- 1986, 7–28 February: Three Views, Grant Matthews, Paul Murphy, Paul Torcello, The Photographers' Gallery
- 2021, October 26–6 November: 21AD, with Dena Ashbolt, Bruce Baldwin, David Blackley, John Boucher, Maree Coote, Mimmo Cozzolino, Jane Flowers, Dianne Gameson, Prue Kirkcaldie, Guy Lamothe, Jo Lane, Michel Lawrence, Ron Mather, Paul Meehan, Ted Powell, Mike Reed, Fysh Rutherford, Gordon Trembath, John Wheeler and Keran Woods at Fortyfivedownstairs in Melbourne

== Collections ==
- Eastman Museum
- Select (USA) Archive
