= Andrew Chapman =

Andrew Chapman may refer to:

- Andrew G. Chapman, American politician
- Andrew Chapman (photographer) (born 1954), Australian photojournalist
- Mark Chapman (broadcaster) (Andrew Mark Chapman, born 1973), British television presenter
- Andy Chapman (born 1959), English soccer player in the US
- Andrew Chapman (writer), British writer of gamebooks; see Category:Books by Andrew Chapman (writer)
