= Artists Space Gallery =

Australian art gallery

Coordinates: 37.781061°S 144.984011°E

Artists Space Gallery was an Australian art gallery showing mainly photography, as well as other media, through the 1980s in Melbourne.

== Foundation ==
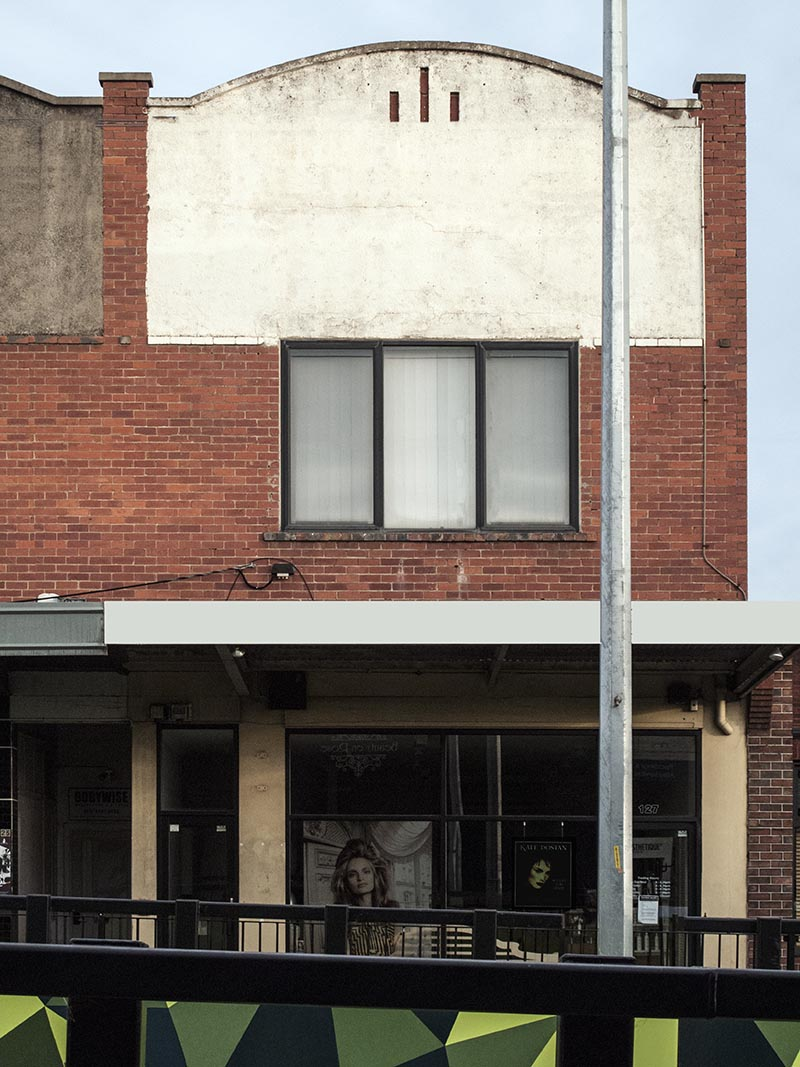
Facade of the former Artists Space Gallery at its original location in Essendon, as seen in 2020. The Gallery occupied the top floor, entered via stair from door left of shop.

The gallery was founded in 1978 by Melbourne painter and photographer Wes Placek. He was joined in the early 80's by his partner Sophie Nowicka a textile designer and artist, who assisted in administration of the gallery and in curatorial selection of exhibitions.

== Location ==
When it opened, the gallery occupied the top floor of a 1920s shopfront in the main street at 127 Buckley St., near the railway station in the working-class suburb Essendon. In 1987 the Gallery was relocated, closer to Melbourne CBD and amongst a growing number of other galleries. Though it also showed other media, it was among contemporary specialist photography galleries The Photographers' Gallery, Brummels and Church Street that revived the medium as an art form. The new space, with four times the floor area, was in a former warehouse in North Fitzroy at 150 Park Street on the corner of Best Street, opposite a linear park created from the Inner Circle Railway Line which had closed in 1981.

== Reception ==
A range of exhibitions included emerging artists and those well recognised nationally and internationally. While located in Essendon, in the opinion of The Age newspaper art reviewer Beatrice Faust, Placek's exhibitions "accumulated a lot of critical capital," as it "showed small collections of consistently good and sometimes excellent work," including Robert Mapplethorpe's 1983 photogravure suite 'Flowers', and also Bettina Rheims. However, in her 1987 review, just after the relocation, Faust feared the extra space would affect the quality of the work shown, though favourable reviews continued.

It signifies the impact of the Gallery, that founder Placek was himself included, among many of the past exhibitors at Artists Space, in the landmark survey show and publication of photography of the 1970s and 1980s, The Thousand Mile Stare.

== Closure ==
Artists Space Gallery closed in 1990.

== Exhibitions included ==
- 1984: Ryszard Otręba, prints (the poster from this solo exhibition is in the collection of the National Gallery of Australia)
- 1986, 11 October – 9 November: Sol Weiner
- 1986, 17 November – 14 December: Displaced Objects - Works by Chris Barry
- 1987, to 30 August: Lauren McIntyre
- 1987, from 4 Nov: "Just Wot”, an exhibition of visual poetry. Incl. Mimmo Cozzolino, Norma Pearce, Anthony Figallo, Julie Clarke-Powell
- 1987, to 31 December: Urban Structures, Janina Green, Lita Los Angeles, Bernice McPherson, Craig McGee, Wes Placek.
- 1988, to 29 Feb: Michael Caddy, Di Clark, Ann Slater
- 1988, 3–27 August: Wes Placek, Paintings
- 1988, 7–25 September: Portraits by Paul Cox, Ben Lewin, Wolfgang Sievers
- 1988, September: Double Exposure
- 1988, to 29 October: Peter Shaw, A Year of Bad Weather
- 1988, to 22 October: Louis Geraldes and Graham Willoughby, Paintings
- 1988, to 18 November: Anthony Figallo and Lloyd Jones; Images of La Mama, and Photographic Collages by Chris Barry
- 1988, to 18 December: Graduate Show, Victoria College
- 1989, to 7 April: Still Life, photography by Janina Green, Robert Mapplethorpe, Wes Placek, Bettina Rheims
- 1989, to 29 July: Wes Placek, Works from the kitchen
- 1989, 6—31 August: Grant Hobson, Transcending Toughness, and work by Paul Watkins
- 1990, to 28 July: Kodak Five Visions, Bill McCann, Charles Radnay, Janina Green, Wes Placek
- 1990, to 25 August: Ian McIntosh ‘Affection’; Rick Wood ‘Fugue’
- 1990, to 30 November: Phillip Institute of Technology 1990 Photography Graduates
- 1990, to 22 December, Paintings and sculptures by Wes Placek, Erika Vike, Sophie Nowicka, Graham Willoughby, Brian McNamara
