= Wildlight (photo agency) =

Australian photography agency 1985–2013

Wildlight was an Australian photo agency operating 1985–2013 which specialised in imagery of that country. In the digital age it continued as a photo library using image assets of its photographers before the digitised material was transferred to the firm Ikosol, and the analogue originals archived.

== Establishment ==
The founders were partners Christina De Water and Phil Quirk, with Carolyn Johns who met Quirk as they photographed for Rick Smolan's A Day in the Life of Australia project during 1981–2. De Water, Johns and Quirk, had discussions with these international photographers, many of whom were attached to photo agencies, as they passed through Sydney on their way to assignments, and realised an Australian agency could offer similar and better services to international magazines and publishers. In 1984 they met with Oliver Strewe about forming such a cooperative, and in 1985 Wildlight Photo Agency opened at 165 Hastings Parade Bondi Beach, which was owned by George Carpenter a retired Sydney barrow man, where they stayed for 10 years. Subsequent offices were at 87 Gloucester Street, The Rocks, then finally Suite 14, 16 Charles St., Redfern.

== Photographers ==
The Wildlight team comprised Christina De Water, Manager; Photo Editor Rachael Knefper, joined in 1986 by Annette Cruger; while photographers were Carolyn Johns, Oliver Strewe and Philip Quirk, joined later in 1985 by photographer Grenville Turner. Other photographers connected as its reputation spread, among them Mark Lang, Jason Busch, Peter Solness, Lorrie Graham, Milton Wordley, and Ben Bohane, while David Moore's and Rennie Ellis’ colour archives were also represented by Wildlight. Its offices welcomed visits from US photographers Gregory Heisler, Arnold Newman, Jay Maisel and UK magazine designer & art director, John Tennant.

== Australian identity ==
An early promotional campaign pitched the agency as "the place for Real Australia in Pictures” and its business focused on promoting the character of the country. Over 1986/7 when global attention was being focused on Australia for its 1988 Bicentenary, Christina De Water traveled to show the photographers' portfolios to magazine editors in the UK, Germany, France, then the US, with an immediate response which boosted assignments for the agency's photographers. IBM commissioned a book illustrated by the four original members and in conjunction with a film of the same name directed by Brian Morris.

From 1990–2003 Quirk was Wildlight's managing director. As part of the agency's activities between 1997 - 2001 he managed and published Australian Faces & Places Diary, a showcase of Australian reportage & documentary photography of exclusively black-and-white imagery printed in warm duo-tone.

== Clientele ==
The Agency's photographs were published in numerous books, newspapers and magazines including The Sunday Times Magazine, The Observer Magazine (UK), Stern, Der Spiegel, GEO, Time, Newsweek and National Geographic, and also appeared in Australian publications and on Australian postage stamps and first-day issues. The Australian Tourist Commission used their imagery, and in the mid-80s they provided the first photographic station identification imagery for the Australian Broadcasting Commission comprising 11 for each state & territory. Wildlight became an associate agency of Australian Associated Press (AAP), contributing to its extensive stock photography library.

== Exikon ==
The agency, as a photographers' cooperative, was wound up on 13 December 2013, but the image collection is maintained by Andrew Stephenson. From 2000 when the digital age took hold, he had been picture editor and photographers' agent at Wildlight and responsible for managing the analogue collection and its amalgamation with a growing digital image library, selection for clients, electronic dispatch, and for shifting the business online. As manager of Exikon Pty. Ltd. in Redfern, in 2003 he took over the picture library from Wildlight, which he now operates with Ikosol, a specialist firm in digital asset management. As of 2020, former Wildlight manager Phil Quirk is archiving its assets.
