= Michael Rayner (photographer) =

Australian press photographer and photojournalist

Michael Rayner (born 1951) is an Australian press photographer and photojournalist.

== Biography ==
Michael Rayner was born in Stockport UK in 1951, 18 months before his parents Alan and Dorothy migrated with him to the industrial Melbourne bayside suburb Altona, as "Ten Pound Poms". During his teenage years Rayner worked a newspaper delivery round. His education at Altona Primary and Altona High limited his study options in his areas of interest; current affairs and news.

== News photographer ==
Having failed his Matriculation, Rayner responded to an advertisement for a cadet photographer in The Age requiring a lesser qualification of a school Leaving certificate. Though his photographic experience was minimal, Rayner's knowledge of politics secured him a position along with four others from a field of 250 applicants. He commenced on Tuesday 31 December 1968. Ron Lovitt, the pictorial editor who employed him and took a famous picture of the last ball of the tied Test cricket match between Australia and the West Indies, was an influence on Rayner's photography. In 1972 he won the Sydney E Pratt Award for the best photograph taken by a cadet Australia-wide; it showed VFL footballer Sam Newman being struck square in the face by the ball he had just missed.

For the newspaper Rayner covered news such as the Franklin River blockade. In 1980 he gained a second place in the Nikon Awards, the following year winning its Best Sports Photograph of the Year for his graphic and comical capture of North Melbourne footballer David Dench's effective smothering of a kick by South Melbourne's John Roberts, and a second prize for 'Sports' in the 1981 Rothmans National Press Photo of the Year, and merit awards for his news and sports images in the Press Photographer of the Year Awards of 1982. Even his earlier editorial photographs provoked an emotional response, and on one occasion he found himself caught up in criminal investigations of corruption in municipal council elections. Major influences on his approach were Age colleagues John Lamb, a multiple Walkley Award winner, and Clive McKinnon and Terry Phelan of The Sun.

From 1983 to 1999 his remit covered all of the Fairfax-owned media. He meanwhile directed 'Impressions Photography' from a shopfront in North Melbourne with partner the press photographer Tony Feder for four years from 1983 for around two hundred clients including Time magazine and The Telegraph in London, then briefly worked freelance on his own 1987- 1988.

Rayner was employed on The Sydney Morning Herald during 1988–1991, on one assignment photographing socialite Susan Renouf in a women's refuge, before once again freelancing 1991–1994. He rejoined The Age in 1994, covering such disparate stories as a 'boot camp' on the Snowy River for troubled teenage girls, rehearsals of the musical A Chorus Line. the repurposing of Melbourne's notorious Pentridge jail as apartments, and the opposite sides in the battle over logging in old growth forests.

== Freelance ==
Rayner remained with Fairfax until 1999 moving, after a period of teaching, to The Weekly Review in April 2015 until late 2017, concurrent with freelance assignments for The Daily Telegraph UK, Sports Illustrated USA, and The Observer UK.

== Mentor and educator ==
Rayner served as a judge on The Age/Nikon school photography competition. From 1999 his professional experience in photography enabled a change of direction and an opportunity to mentor others in his role as manager of Feral Fine Art Gallery & Cafe (1999–2004) in rural Forrest, alongside his teaching in the medium at Photography Studies College (1999-2008) and Mallacoota ACFE (2008–2011).

== Portraitist ==
Rayner's approach to pictures of people in the news is influenced by the environmental portraits of Arnold Newman and Bill Brandt and the photojournalism of W. Eugene Smith. Alongside his sports photograph, one portrait was awarded a first in the 1980, and a second in the 1982 and 1984 Rothmans Press Awards. His subjects have included Mel Gibson, Bob Hawke when he resigned from the ACTU and launched his Federal election campaign, Eddie McGuire, Paul Keating, Jean Bedford, Kate Langbroek, Steven Berkoff, Tony Greig Guy Pearce, David Gulpilil, Peter Carey, Hugo Weaving, Rachel Griffiths, Gérard Depardieu, Andrea Stretton and Adam Elliot, though not all such assignments went smoothly; Mushroom Records was reported as having treated Rayner 'aggressively' when he attempted to photograph singer Jimmy Barnes in 'casual clothes'. The resulting images were run by The Age regardless, with useful publicity for Barnes.

== Personal life ==
Rayner has married once and is divorced, with a son and a daughter.

== Books ==
Aside from numbers of publications in which his photographs are illustrations, Rayner has published;

- Ticket to Ride, the Australian continent photographed on train journeys with text by Anthony Dennis;
- Caribbean Odyssey showing cricket culture in the West Indies;
- Contact Renewed; Australia versus the new South Africa; on Test cricket after apartheid.
- Sydney since the Opera House: an architectural walking guide
- Morecroft, Richard; Sweeney, Paul; Rayner, Michael, 1951-; Morecroft, Richard (1991), Raising Archie : the story of Richard Morecroft and his flying fox, Simon & Schuster, ISBN 978-0-7318-0254-8

== Collections ==
- National Library of Australia
- State Library of Victoria
