= Peter Leiss =

Australian photographer, filmmaker, actor, and producer, born 1951

Peter Leiss (born 1951) is an Australian photographer, filmmaker, actor, and producer whose work spans documentary, staged sequences, and stills photography for feature films. His photography practice has participated in the evolution in Australia from documentary and craft toward a more conceptual and intermedial art form, while he contributed also to avant-garde theatre.

== Early life and training ==
Peter Leiss was born in London in 1951 to Czech parents, sales clerk Alena Luise, and Eugene, a businessman, and was the brother of Eugen. He spent his early childhood in Tokyo, before migrating to Australia in his youth. After secondary schooling at Chadstone High, Peter Leiss studied at Brighton Technical College (1969) in art and design, and then undertook photography and filmmaking studies at Prahran College in Melbourne during 1970–71, where he was taught by Gordon De'Lisle, Athol Shmith and Paul Cox.

At Prahran, Leiss was part of a cohort that engaged with photography as an expressive, art-based medium rather than a purely documentary or commercial practice. During his student years, he produced photographic essays and short films.

Leiss also established links with other Australian photographic practitioners, closely associating with Carol Jerrems, Graham Howe, Mimmo Cozzolino and Phil Quirk.

== Photographer ==
After working briefly as an assistant film editor at the Australian Broadcasting Commission using his experience of making shorts at Prahran College, Leiss travelled during 1974–76 to Europe and Asia, returning to lecture at the Council of Adult Education. He later spent periods living and working in New York and Los Angeles.

Leiss’s photographic output includes:

- A street/urban photographic body of work from 1969–1974, shown at Brummels Gallery as Urban Labyrinth, one image from which served as the cover for Graham Howe’s New Photography Australia (1974).
- The Enneagram Series (circa 1978), a series of staged, diagrammatic portraits exploring psychological types.
- Regression (retrospective, 1988), a survey exhibition tracing seventeen years of Leiss’s work across documentary, architectural imagery, and tableau photography.

Recurring concerns in his work include urban form and architecture, staged portraiture, literary and psychoanalytic references (e.g. Kafka, Pynchon), and a use of colour and monochrome as formal devices rather than solely expressive ones.

Later, Leiss worked as a stills photographer on feature films including Romper Stomper (1992), Only the Strong (1993) and directed documentaries and short films. He also contributed to the photographic community through lectureships (in photography at the Centre for Adult Education and in filmmaking at RMIT) and curatorial and archival projects. On 10 May 2025 he presented on students of cinema, with Adrian Danks and Mimmo Cozzolino at the Museum of Australian Photography.

== Filmmaker and film actor ==
Leiss acted Lyautey's adjudant in Isabelle Eberhardt (1991), the army sergeant in The Garth Method (2004), as Dr Peter Wilmott in a 1997 episode of the TV series State Coroner, and a prison officer on another TV episode Good Guys, Bad Guys 1997), in Black Box (1998), then as himself in Unfolding Florence: The Many Lives of Florence Broadhurst (2006).

In 2005 Leiss, with Esben Storm, directed and filmed the docudrama The bridge at midnight trembles, conceived by Leiss, which starred Richard Moir as himself in a struggle with Parkinson's Disease.

== Theatre ==
Leiss's "subtle and sardonic manner" as "a self-amused teacher on the down-side of life" opposite Ann Shulman in Educating Rita at the MIllbrook Playhouse Cabaret was hailed by critic Jim Runkle in 1985. Leiss played a painter in Franco Marinai's 1988 experimental film Mock Gravity, which used hand-drawing on film stock for sequences representing flashbacks and the actors' thoughts, and it was shown at 26th annual Ann Arbor Film Festival, and chosen for the 1988 Melbourne International Film Festival.

Leiss on return to Australia in 1995 was a co-founder of WAX Studios Inc. in Richmond and over 1996–2000 designed the sets for Cowboy Mouth (1997), and acted in productions including a September 1997 Harold Pinter double bill, The Dumb Waiter and The Lover of which reviewer Helen Thomson wrote:

Peter Leiss as Ben and Robert Corner as Gus give fine performances, creating the complex rhythms, the unexplained gaps, the shocking ordinariness necessary to build up the play’s suspense and give its conclusion the maximum shock impact.

On 25 August 1999 Antarctica Starts Here written by Leiss opened at Wax Studios.

== Exhibitions, reception and legacy ==
From the 1970s onward, Leiss’s work has been shown in both solo and group exhibitions in Australia, where he exhibited several times at The Photographers' Gallery and Workshop, Brummels Gallery, the Performing Arts Museum and elsewhere, and in the United States (1989).

In recent years, his work has been included in the major exhibition The Basement: Photography from Prahran College (1968–1981) at the Museum of Australian Photography, and in Long Exposure at the Ballarat International Foto Biennale. curated to reassess the pioneering and continuing contributions of Prahran’s photography alumni.

Critical reception of his photography has varied: admirers note his formal precision and poetic framing, while detractors sometimes question whether the body of work accumulates into a sufficiently distinct signature. Beatrice Faust, in an early review noted Leiss’s ongoing involvement in documenting the Prahran community. Through interviews and archival efforts he has contributed to the history of Australian photography.

== Awards ==
- 1979: Visual Arts Board Grant

== Collections ==
- National Gallery of Australia
- Joyce Evans Archive, National Library of Australia
- Josef Lebovic gallery, Sydney.
