= Murray Art Museum Albury =

- Established: October 2nd 2015
- Location: Dean Street, Albury, New South Wales Australia
- Coordinates: 36.08059°S 146.916753°E
- Type: Art museum
- Directors: Jacqui Hemsley, November 2015 - September 2016 Bree Pickering, November 2016 - March 2023 Blair French, January 2024 - current
- Curators: Michael Moran, Nanette Orly, Andrea Briggs.
- Public transit access: Dean St, Albury.
- Website: www.mamalbury.com.au

Murray Art Museum Albury (abbreviated MAMA) is a contemporary art museum located in Albury, Australia. Formerly known as the Albury Regional Art Gallery it was renamed as part of a $10.5 million refurbishment which included renovations to the former gallery building, the neighbouring Burrows House and the extensions linking and extending both buildings into QEII Square. The internal size of the museum expanded from 832m² to 2036m², with an Atrium on the ground floor leading to 7 gallery spaces over two levels. The building was designed by architect firm NBRS and Partners.

On the north facing terrace of the museum is Canvas Eatery, a restaurant operated by Tim Tehan. Canvas offers relaxed modern cuisine overlooking QEII Square.

== Collection ==
The museum manages the art collection of Albury City Council, an extensive collection of over 3000 items. Early acquisitions to the collection were drawn from the Albury Art Prize, which was established in 1947. The founding of the National Photography Prize in 1983 encouraged a new focus on contemporary Australian photography, building on some earlier acquisitions. The National Photography Prize continues to the present day and continues to be a key source of acquisitions. The photography collection comprise over 600 works and is one of the most important of its kind in Australia. It includes works by Tracey Moffatt, Max Dupain, Richard Woldendorp, Michael Riley, Destiny Deacon, Olive Cotton, Justine Varga and Philip Quirk.

Other highlights in the permanent collection include works by Russell Drysdale, Margaret Olley, Patrick Hartigan, Lorraine Connelly-Northey, Brook Garru Andrew and Hany Armanious.

== Exhibitions ==
Murray Art Museum Albury opened on October 2, 2015, with the exhibition Wiradjuri Ngurambanggu (On Wiradjuri Country) and featured the work of contemporary indigenous artists Jonathan Jones, Brook Andrew, Lorraine Connelly-Northey, Karla Dickens and Nicole Foreshew.

Major exhibitions have included:

- Impressions of Paris: Lautrec, Degas, Daumier (12 December 2015 - 31 January 2016)
- Marilyn: Celebrating an American Icon (12 February 2016 - 8 May 2016)
- MAMA Art Foundation National Photography Prize 2016 (21 May 2016 - 7 August 2016)
- SPEED: The Fast and the Curious (20 August 2016 - 6 November 2016)
- MAMA Summer Pop (18 November 2016 - 22 January 2017)
- Yours. Celebrating 70 years of collecting (3 February 2017 - 17 April 2017)
- Being Tiwi & Primavera at 25 (28 April 2017 - 25 June 2017)
- Yao Jui-Chung + Lost Society Document + Sandy Hsiu-Chih Lo: Mirage: Disused Public Property in Taiwan (7 July 2017 - 17 September 2017)
- Landmarks (29 September 2017 - 3 December 2017)
- 2017 Archibald Prize (15 December 2017 - 28 January 2018)
- Material Sound (9 February 2018 - 29 April 2018)
- MAMA Art Foundation National Photography Prize 2018 (10 May 2018 - 22 July 2018)
- Immortality
- Sidney Nolan's Ned Kelly series
- John Mawurndjul: I am the old and the new
- Zzzzz: Sleep, somnambulism, madness
- Certain realities
- Pets
- National Photography Prize 2020
- COLLECTION
- 20:20
- Notes from the Field: Bogong Centre for Sound Culture
- Choose Happiness
- SIMMER
- National Photography Prize 2022 (26 February - 5 June 2022)
- Zombie Eaters (17 June - 16 October 2022)
- BOUND (28 October 2022 - 19 February 2023)
- No Easy Answers (10 March - 16 July 2023)
- Newell Harry: Esperanto (28 July - 26 November 2023)
- giyawarra-nanha gulbalanha / disturbing the peace (15 December 2023 - 10 March 2024)

== Programs ==
In its programming, Murray Art Museum Albury emphasises original, self-curated exhibitions, and actively supports the practice of established and emerging contemporary Australian artists. The museum is a significant commissioner of new artworks by Australian artists, and also supports new commissions by arts writers, independent curators and partnerships with other cultural organisations.

The museum has a variety of spaces available for public events and programs, hosting a year-round program of exhibition openings, artist-led talks, field trips, tours, and workshops. Additionally, the museum hosts a commercial art education program in MAMA Studio, featuring short courses and workshops for adults and Art School and Art Camp for kids and teens. All programs are inspired by the current exhibitions and developed to further explore ideas and themes in the artwork.

In addition, a number of monthly clubs and weekly art talks are hosted by the museum, which support the community building aspects of the museum. This is further enhanced by the MAMA Members program, and the museum's volunteer program, which encourage deeper engagement.

The museum is an important cultural asset for the Albury-Wodonga community, and is well utilised by local school groups, preschools, and independent education providers as a destination for tours, excursions and studio art workshops.

== Philanthropy ==
Murray Art Museum Albury is supported by an independent fundraising organisation, the MAMA Art Foundation. The Foundation is the primary supporter of the biennial National Photography Prize, as well as providing funds for the acquisition of new work for the permanent collection.

== Governance ==
Murray Art Museum Albury is currently operated by AlburyCity Council. In May 2018, AlburyCity Council voted to begin a process of transitioning the Museum to an independent model of governance. In December 2020, Council endorsed the model of a Company Limited by Guarantee as the preferred governance model. In May 2021, a Provisional Board was endorsed. In November 2022, approval for the transition was granted by the Minister for Local Government. In July 2023, a new entity, MAMA Ltd, was formed with a founding Board of Directors.

The transition to independence remains ongoing. Under the new model, the Museum will continue to be financially supported by AlburyCity Council. Council will continue to operate the Museum until final agreements are made with MAMA Ltd, and an operational transition is complete.

== See also ==
1. Albury Library Museum
