= David Dench =

Australian rules footballer

Personal information
- Full name: David Dench
- Born: 23 August 1951 (age 75)
- Original team: West Coburg (EDFL)
- Height: 191 cm (6 ft 3 in)
- Weight: 89 kg (196 lb)

Playing career^{1}
Years	Club	Games (Goals)
1969–1984	North Melbourne	275 (29)

Representative team honours
Years	Team	Games (Goals)
	Victoria	4 (0)
- ^{1} Playing statistics correct to the end of 1984.

Career highlights
- North Melbourne premiership player 1975; North Melbourne premiership captain 1977; North Melbourne Team of the Century; Syd Barker Medal 1971, 1976, 1977, 1981; North Melbourne captain 1972

David Dench (born 23 August 1951) is a former Australian rules footballer in the (then) Victorian Football League. He played his whole career with North Melbourne Football Club during one of its most successful periods.

== VFL career ==
Dench played full-back, and was considered one of the finest full-backs in VFL/AFL history. He was recruited from the West Coburg. Dench won the North Melbourne club's best and fairest award, the Syd Barker Medal, on four occasions - 1971, 1976, 1977, 1981. In 1972 David Dench at the age of 21 he became one of the youngest captains appointed in the Kangaroos' history. He also captained the 1977 premiership team, due to Keith Greig's absence because of an injury. In the 1977 VFL Grand Final, Ron Barassi moved him to the forward line, where he sparked North Melbourne Football Club's revival by contributing to the forward line and kicking goals, to draw with Collingwood Football Club.

A graphic and comical photograph of Dench smothering of a kick by South Melbourne's John Roberts was made in 1981 by Michael Rayner of The Age which won the Nikon Awards Best Sports Photograph of the Year.

In 1984 Dench was told by his coach Barry Cable that his playing days were numbered and was going to play out the season in the reserves. Dench was not happy with this so he grabbed his gear and went home and retired. His relationship with Cable has been fractured ever since, with Dench refusing to speak to Cable again.

When John (Kanga) Kennedy was appointed coach he tried to convince Dench to play again but the condition of his knees was poor and he stayed as an assistant coach.

== Post AFL career and personal life ==
In 2000 Dench was inducted into the Australian Football Hall of Fame.

His daughter, Michelle is a distinguished Australian sportswoman. She played high level basketball before taking up Australian football playing over 100 games for her club Melbourne University. She also represented Victoria and Australia as well as captaining her club to a premiership.

In 2008, Dench served four months in jail for his minor role in a scheme to defraud Victoria University out of millions of dollars.
