= Science and nature =

Science and nature may refer to:

- Science & Nature (The Bluetones album), 2000
- Science & Nature (Inkubus Sukkubus album), 2007
