= Mudslide (disambiguation) =

Mudslide is a colloquial term for mudflow, the most rapid and fluid type of earth movement.

Mudslide may also refer to:

- Mudslide (EP), a 2000 EP by The Bluetones
- "Mudslide" (Batman: The Animated Series), a 1993 episode of Batman: The Animated Series
- Mudslide (comics), a DC Comics character and member of the Masters of Disaster
- Mudslide, a variation of a White Russian cocktail
- "Mudslide", a song by Guys All-Star Shoe Band from A Prairie Home Companion soundtrack
