= Jonathan Shaw (photographer) =

British photographer and educator

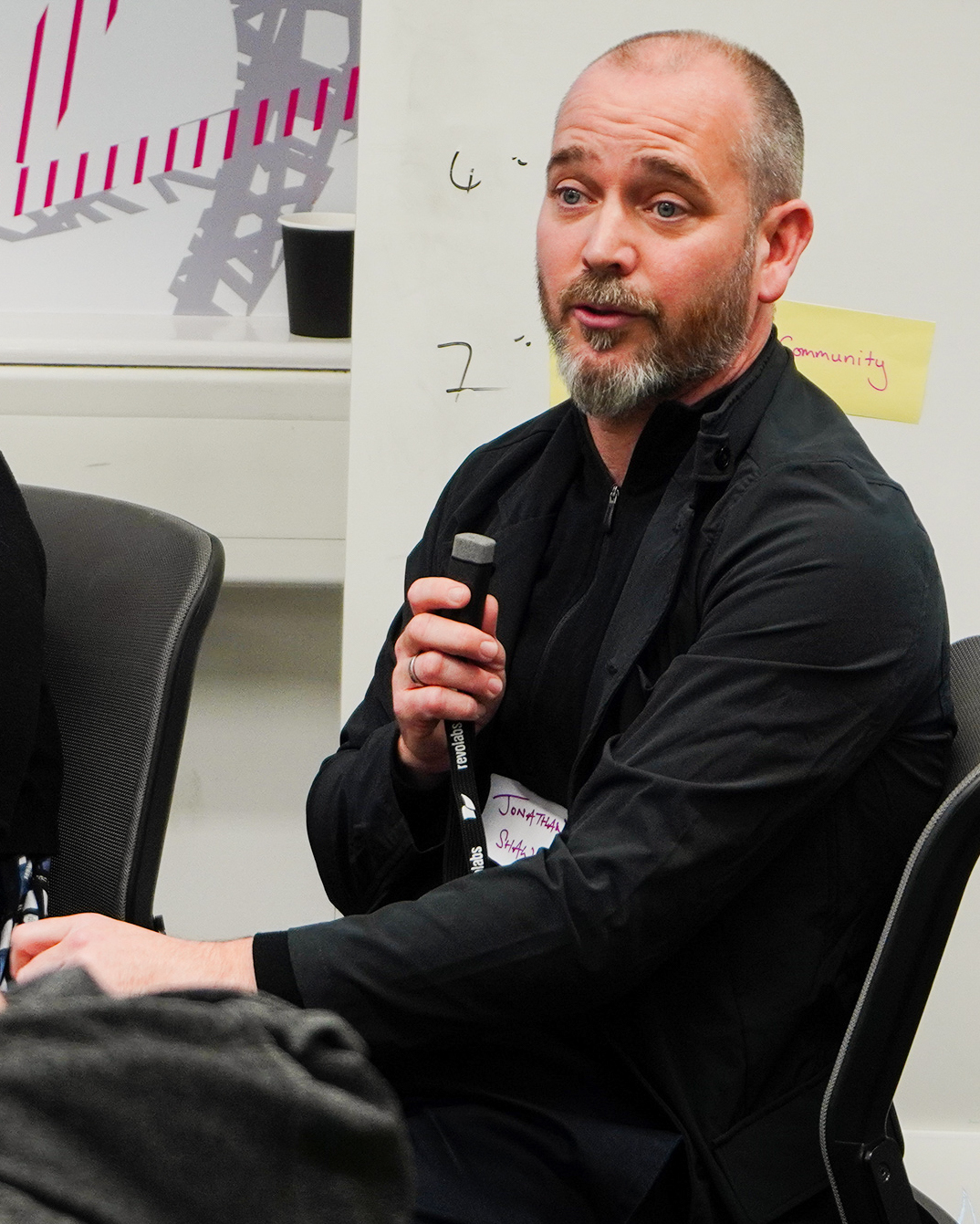
- Alma mater: University of the West of England; Birmingham City University
- Occupation: Photographer, academic
- Employer: Coventry University (2002–)
- Awards: Fellow of the Royal Society of Arts; Fellow of the Royal Photographic Society
- Website: http://jonathan-shaw.com/

Jonathan Shaw is a British photographer and educator.

== Photography ==
Shaw's work has been shown at Leeds Met Gallery, Goethe Institute in Dresden, Germany and Birmingham Museum and Art Gallery.

Shaw is a Fellow of the Royal Photographic Society and is a member of the society's 'Multimedia and Narrative Distinction Panel' alongside Andy Golding (University of Westminster) and Daniel Meadows among others.

He is chair of the board of directors of Birmingham Open Media, and a trustee of The Photographers' Gallery; and sits on the advisory board for Photomediations Machine.

He was chair of the Association for Photography in Higher Education from 2014 to 2017. He sits on the editorial board of Media Practice & Education, and was a guest editor of a "special disrupted issue" of the Journal of Media Practice in May 2018. He is the international member of the academic board of the Photography Studies College, Melbourne, Australia, and a visiting professor at Bournemouth University's Centre for Excellence in Media Practice.

== Publications ==
=== Publications by Shaw ===
- Crash. The New Art Gallery Walsall (2009)
- Newfotoscapes. A multi-platform open book (2014)

=== Publications with contributions by Shaw ===
- Time|Motion. Dewi Lewis (2003)
- (re)collect. Pavilion (2006)

== Exhibitions ==
- 2009: Crash, The New Art Gallery Walsall
- 2010: On The Move, Estorick Collection, London. Group exhibition curated by Jonathan Miller.
