= Photography Studies College =

Australian photography college

Coordinates: 37°49′20″S 144°57′57″E

Photography Studies College, commonly abbreviated to PSC, is a privately owned independent tertiary photography college established in 1973, located in Melbourne, Victoria, Australia.

== History ==
=== 1973 founding ===
Photography Studies College was first named the Gallery School of Photographic Art when it was founded by Roger Hayne at its present address in 1973, through his business Impact Photography Pty. Ltd., 203 Canterbury Road, St Kilda. Previously a publicity officer for the Victorian Railways he had later worked with the Australian Antarctic Division. During the seventies he traveled and photographed around Australia, in Europe, Russia, Asia and the Arctic and, along with his photographs from the Antarctic, he exhibited that work in 'Lifestyles and Landscapes' at PSC over July 1980. By late 1977 there were 250 students enrolled, and the institution was an employer of career photographers including lecturers John Cato, videographer Phillip Ashton, landscape photographer John Riches, and Ted Keogh, by tutors Philip Quirk, Ian Cherchi and later Sandra Irvine who all trained at Prahran College, and Jean-Marc Le Pechoux, founder/editor of Light Vision. In mid 1978 the school was advertising that its courses 'For a Professional Career' were the first to be recognised by the Australian Institute of Professional Photography.

An early innovation of the course was that the first semester students were required to use colour transparency film exclusively, to encourage in-camera composition and to learn correct exposure without the cropping and adjustment enabled in black-and-white processing and printing which was reserved to second semester. The use of colour 'slides' lent itself to the teaching of programmed multi-projector audio visuals. Tutorial reviews of students' progress in their photography was conducted weekly. A program of visiting lecturers including photojournalist Graham Bezant, and fashion and advertising professionals Robert Imhoff, John Street, Peter Walton and Michael Wennrich was introduced to augment the teaching program.

=== Name change ===
In July 1978 the name had been changed to 'Photography Studies College' supported in marketing by the adoption of a distinctive lens-aperture logo (which, in 2020, it still uses) and more modern typeface, and it advertised full-time and part-time courses in "Photojournalism, Expressive Art Photography, Advertising and Fashion Illustration, or Audio-Visual Production" with no formal academic qualifications required for entry into its summer and winter semester intakes of both school leavers and mature-age students.

=== 1980s ===
One of the college audio-visual productions of this period was 'A Taste of Life', a "sensitive illustration of life for the disabled" which was presented as part of the Moomba Festival program of 1981, utilising the carousel slide projector. The college enjoyed relationships with 1990s organisations including a school for autistic children, the Police Training Academy, the Royal Children's Hospital and the Gertrude Street Artists' Space which each granted students access and permission to photograph. The college maintained a rural retreat on a property between Faraday and Chewton for weekend classes away from Melbourne, and in the mid-80s, Hayne conducted photographic expeditions to the Middle East and China for groups of students.

An 'advertorial' in The Age newspaper in March 1983 promoted College courses in videography, announcing that "the video revolution is upon us". Staff member Sue Scales, interviewed for a 1985 advertising feature emphasised the size of the photography industry with an Australian national annual turnover of $1376 million and noted that the college had a "faculty of nine full-time and part-time lecturers...drawn from both the profession and the arts." Typical fees for a college course such as video in the 1980s was $A500. By the end of the 1980s the college was in competition with five other public and private institutions, including ACPAC which was started by ex-PSC lecturers Perry and Riches, that were offering tertiary-level photography courses. Its annual graduate exhibition was attracting attention, and critic Gary Catalano in 1985 hailed a show of thirteen final year and recently graduated women students as "the best exhibition of photography I have seen for a long time", with special praise for "a concern with intimate experience" in works by Chris Barry, Claire Jackson, Stephanie Stead, Josephine Kuperholz and Seham Abi-Elias.

=== 1990s ===
Hayne remained director into the 1990s. From April 1986, Chief Executive Officer of PSC was Julie Moss, who continues in the position. They secured sponsorship from the firm Agfa-Gevaert, starting February 1989, to offer a part-scholarship for photographic materials to selected College students. During the 1990s Moss established the first formal credit transfer arrangement between a private vocational college and a university, a move supported by Dr Robin Williams, then Dean of RMIT. Up until 2013 (when PSC began to deliver its own bachelor's degree course) the arrangement enabled PSC Advanced Diploma graduates to articulate into a Degree in Photography at RMIT, and PSC became the first private Australian college authorised to provide photographic education to international students. Moss improved the professional viability of college courses by liaising with industry bodies the Media, Entertainment & Arts Alliance and the Australian Institute of Professional Photographers to create key pathways into the industry including a mentoring program established in 1993. By the end of the decade the cost of the Diploma in Illustrative Photography had risen to $8,000 per annum, with additional expense for equipment and materials.

=== Twenty-first century ===
The school occupied its original buildings at 61-63 City Road and also the adjoining buildings at 65–67 City Road, Southbank (previously South Melbourne) up until December 2019. In January 2020 the college moved to new purpose-built facilities, increasing its size, at 37-47 Thistlethwaite St, South Melbourne.

In 2013 PSC began offering a fully accredited three-year Bachelor of Photography programme, and in 2018 PSC commenced delivery of a fully accredited 18-month Master of Arts Photography programme. It is a dual sector provider of Higher Education and VET Programs, and is a fully accredited Higher Education provider and Registered Training Organisation. The college is a member of Independent Higher Education Australia.

== Administration ==
- CEO - Julie Moss
- Dean of Photography Studies - Daniel Boetker-Smith.
- Master of Arts - Photography, Coordinator - Dr. Kristian Häggblom
- Art Photography Coordinators - Sarina Lirosi, Dr. Hoda Afshar
- Commercial Photography Coordinator - Mia Mala McDonald
- Photojournalism/Documentary Photography Coordinator - Dr. Kristian Häggblom

== Lecturers ==
=== Guest lecturers and Mentors ===
Guest Lecturers and Mentors at PSC include:

- Susan Bright
- Dayanita Singh
- Adi Nes
- Martin Parr
- Richard Billingham
- Bryan Schutmaat
- Jonathan Shaw
- Mathieu Asselin
- Clare Strand

=== Past lecturers ===
- John Cato
- Jean-Marc Le Pechoux
- Michael Rayner

== Awards/achievements ==
- Graduating students earned Institute of Australian Professional Photographers Student of the Year Award in 1978, 1980, 1983, 1984, 1985, 2013, 2016, 2018
- In 2011, 2012, 2013, 2014, 2015 & 2016 PSC was awarded the national award for educational excellence by both peak photography industry bodies in Australia - the Australian Institute of Professional Photographers and the Association of Australian Commercial & Media Photographers (now amalgamated with AIPP).
- In 2016, 2017, 2018 & 2019 PSC took part in the Australian Government's SES (Student Experience Survey) regularly achieving the highest scores nationally in the Creative Arts category in a number of areas inc.: Overall quality of educational experience; Teaching quality; Learner engagement; Learning resources; Student support; Skills development.

== Alumni ==
- Joyce Evans

== Courses ==
The college offers Certificate, Diploma, Advanced Diploma, Bachelor's degree, and Masters courses in Photography in both full-time and part-time modes with Advanced Diploma, Bachelor, and Masters courses being exclusive to PSC.

All courses are formally and officially accredited nationally. The college has two intakes in February and July for most courses. It also offers short and online courses and workshops in photography, video, professional practice, and book-making.

Application for enrolment in the Bachelor programme is made directly to the college or through VTAC (Victorian Tertiary Admissions Centre).

All other courses are via direct application to the college.
