= Andrew Chapman (photographer) =

Australian photojournalist (born 1954)

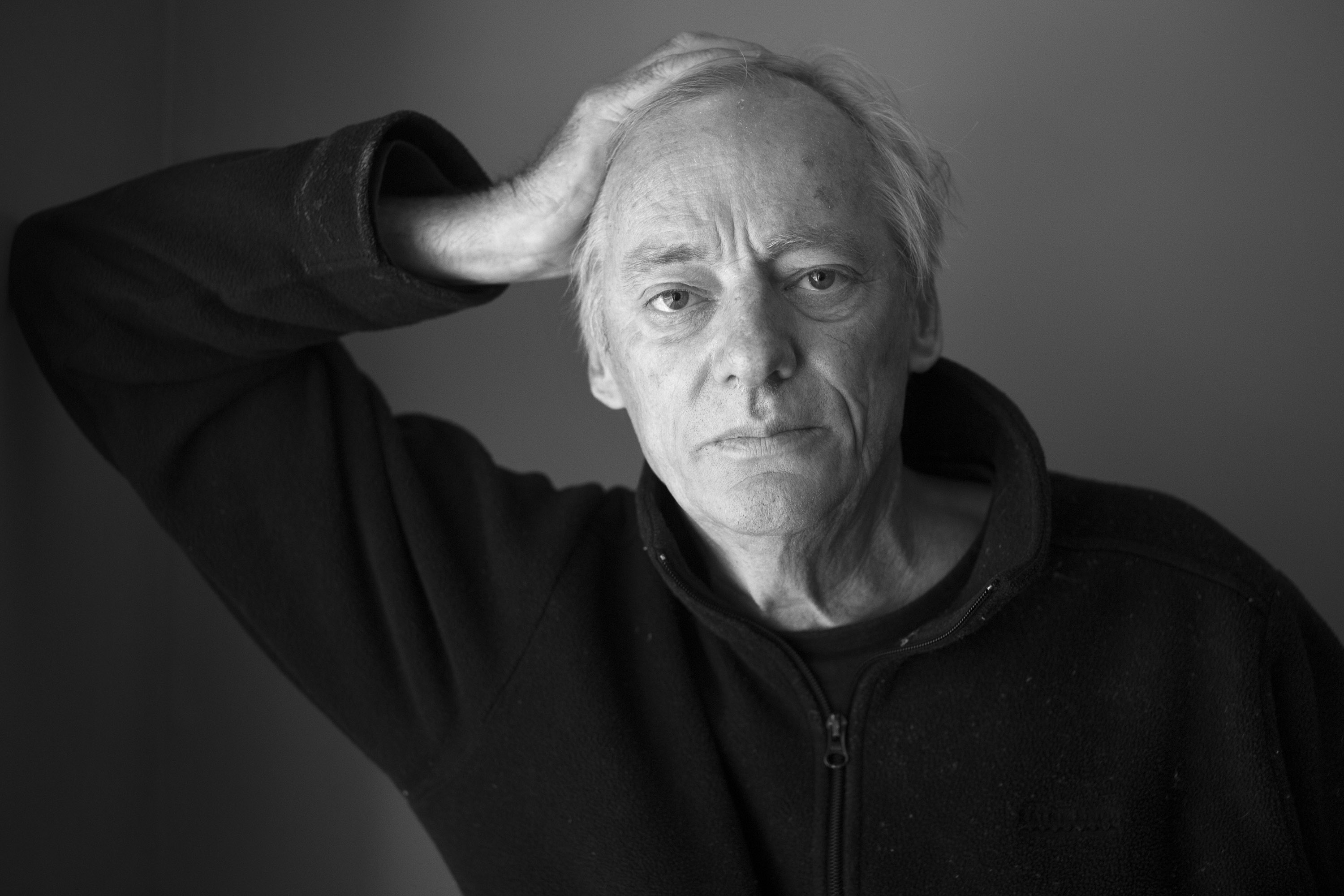
- Krystal Seigerman (2014) Portrait of photographer Andrew Chapman, OAM
- Born: 29 June 1954 (age 72); Melbourne, Victoria
- Occupation: Photojournalist
- Spouse: Josie Chapman

Andrew Chapman OAM (born 29 June 1954), is an Australian photojournalist.

== Biography ==
Andrew Chapman was born in Melbourne on 29 June 1954 to parents John L. Chapman, export manager at the Australian Wheat Board, and Elizabeth R. Chapman (Stubbings) a writer. He trained at Prahran College of Advanced Education 1974-6, where he was taught by Athol Shmith, John Cato and Paul Cox, whom he remembers;

"These 3 fabulous image makers helped inspire a generation of photographers that went on to make their mark in Australian society and overseas...The Photographic dept, in the bowels of the Arts Building was eternally underfunded, except in one area, "creativity". I for one still remember many of the sayings Cato would weekly give out, like, "evolution breeds in adversity"

In his studies Chapman specialised in documentary, photojournalism & landscape photography. From 1978 he first worked for The Melbourne Times, then for Syme Community Newspapers and has since been a freelancer contributing toTime, on the cover of which his work featured more than a dozen times, BRW and The Bulletin, as well as Australian newspapers.

Rural Australia, its human and animal inhabitants, European and indigenous, the harshness and beauty of the Australian bush landscape, its vernacular architecture, and lively Australian Federal politics are Chapman's main photographic subjects. All entail frequent long-distance travel across the island continent, and the work of Jeff Carter is an inspiration to him in that regard; his advice to other photographers is to "explore Australia’s ‘inner circle’, away from the cities and coast."

Since 2006, Chapman has published more than a dozen books and has made photographic contributions to others. He has exhibited in Australia, France and the USA.

In 2011 Chapman had a liver transplant, during which he was almost blinded due to a viral infection, prompting him to hold a 2012 exhibition Nearly A Retrospective, a survey of four decades of his work. Chris Franklin recorded Andrew's recollection of events around the transplant and reflections on his lifelong calling in photography in Yellow which won the international Lift-Off Global Network Best Short Documentary in 2019.

== MAP Group ==
In 1998, with a group of other professional photographers seeking to rekindle the tradition of documentary photography, Chapman founded MAP – Many Australian Photographers, its title later simplified to MAP Group, with Chapman the inaugural president. He initiated a project of the group resulting in a widely viewed exhibition that toured the country for 5 years, and publication; ‘Beyond Reasonable Drought’, recording global warming-induced drought across Australia.

Chapman's mentorship of other photographers extends also beyond the MAP Group.

== Awards ==
Finalist in:

- Moran Photographic Prize
- New North Photographic Prize
- Bowness Photography Prize
- Head On Landscape Prize.

In 2014, Chapman was awarded an OAM in the Australia Day Honours for his service to the arts as a photographer.

== Exhibitions ==
=== Solo ===
- 2026–27, 3 September–19 February:The Green Bus. City Gallery, Melbourne Town Hall
- 2017: Giving Life, charting the pathways of Organ Donation, Flinders Medical centre Adelaide, touring nationally.
- 2016, July: Giving Life, charting the pathways of Organ Donation, Magnet Galleries, Bourke St Melbourne
- 2016/2017, 10 November–29 January: Drive Line: Andrew Chapman at Ford Broadmeadows, Gee Lee-Wik Doleen Gallery, Craigieburn Hume Global Learning Centre, 75-95 Central Park Avenue, Craigieburn
- 2015: Wool & Politics, Metropolis gallery, Geelong
- 2012: Nearly A Retrospective, 60 print show survey of four decades, Burrinja Gallery, Upwey
- 2012, May–June: Palimpsest, Images from a Disappearing Landscape, Hume Global Learning Centre, Craigieburn
- 2011: The Mark Of Time, New North Gallery, Fairfield
- 2008, April–May: Campaign & Italian Visions, New North Gallery, Fairfield
- 2007, February – April: Campaign, Old Parliament House, Canberra
- 2004 – 2012: The Shearers, 60 monochrome documentary Images. Touring the Eastern States of Australia at 14 venues including The Monash Gallery of Art, The State Library of NSW, Shear Outback Hay NSW, Museum of The Riverina, The National Wool Museum, Geelong and The Daylesford Foto Biennale 2007.
- 2005, October: Knox Sporting Heroes, 32 B&W documentary Images celebrating community sporting personalities. Knox City Council Offices and other locations.
- 2005, January. Yering Station, Yarra Valley
- 2004, June: Lanyon Homestead, Canberra, ACT.
- 2003, September: CP Photo Galleries, East Sydney, NSW.
- 2003, June Journeys, 20 monochrome landscape prints, Toorak South Yarra Library, South Yarra
- 2003: Ways Of Seeing, 35 colour landscape and portrait prints. Cooks Corner Gallery & Tearooms, Kallista
- 2002, January: Shear Outback, Hay, NSW.
- 2000, February: Click : Rural Photographs by Andrew Chapman, 60 black and white documentary prints. National Wool Museum, Geelong
- 2000, June: The Gold Museum, Ballarat, Vic.

=== Group ===
- 2025, 23 August–19 October: Long Exposure: The Legacy of Prahran College
- 2025, May: Beyond the Basement, Magnet Galleries, Docklands, Melbourne
- 2025: March–May: The Basement, Museum of Australian Photography
- 2008: Beyond Reasonable Drought, Old Parliament House, Canberra and touring nationally over 5 years. Chapman led 38 professional photographers to document climate change and drought across Australia
- 2006, July: Making Hay. Instigator of a team of 27 professional photographers documenting the NSW town of Hay in April 2006, donating 100 prints to the Hay community as a visual record. Exhibited at Shear Outback Museum, Hay, Span Gallery, Melbourne 2006 and Castlemaine State Festival in March–April 2007
- 2006, April: Australian Chronicles, 11 Prints from "The Shearers" series, part of a group show. Photo Visions Gallery, Montpellier, France. Images reshown during the 2007 Rugby World Cup.
- 2005-2007: Snapping St Arnaud. Chapman led a team of 16 professional photographers in documenting the Victorian town of St Arnaud in Sept 2005, donating 107 prints to their community as a visual record. Exhibited at the Kara Kara Shire Hall, St Arnaud. Feature exhibition, "Daylesford Foto Biennale", June 2007
- 2005, July: Leica CCP Photojournalism Awards, 6 monochrome prints on political campaigns. Centre For Contemporary Photography, Fitzroy, Vic.
- 2005, June Che Evoca, landscapes of Italy, CP Photo Galleries, East Sydney, NSW.
- 1998: Ararat, A Rural Town In Focus. Instigator of a team of 40 professional photographers that documented the Victorian town of Ararat in 1998, donating 107 prints to their community as a visual record. Exhibited 1998, Ararat Regional Gallery, Ararat, Vic.

== Publications ==
- Loftus-Hills, Stella; Chapman, Andrew (September 2026). The Green Bus: Andrew Chapman's 55-year photographic journey through the streets of Melbourne. Melbourne: City of Melbourne.
- Chapman, Andrew; Coyne, Michael; Attwood, Alan; McArdle, James (2025). Fill the Frame (1st ed.). Ballarat East, Vic.: Ten Bag Press. ISBN 9780646720562.
- Chapman, Andrew; Lee, Tim (2019). Woolsheds. Volume 2 Volume 2. Ten Bag Press. ISBN 978-0-646-80382-1. OCLC 1128832876.
- Chapman, Andrew; McNicol, Adam, (writer of introduction.) (2016), The farm : images of rural Australia, Echo Publishing, ISBN 978-1-76040-428-4
- Chapman, Andrew; Watson, Don, 1949-, (writer of added text.) (2015), Political vision : a photographic journey through Australian politics, Echo, ISBN 978-1-76006-736-6
- Chapman, Andrew; Lee, Tim (2014). The long paddock: a photographic journey along Australia's longest stock route. The Five Mile Press. ISBN 978-1-74346-726-8. OCLC 879460429.
- Chapman, Andrew; Burrinja Gallery (host institution.) (2012), Andrew Chapman : nearly a retrospective : 29 August-28 October 2012, Upwey, Vic. Burrinja Gallery*
- Chapman, Andrew (2012). Around the sheds: life in and around the woolsheds. Ferntree Gully, VIC: The Five Mile Press Pty Ltd : [distributor] Grantham Book Services Ltd : [distributor] The Five Mile Press : [distributor] David Bateman Ltd : [distributor] PSD Promotions (Pty) Ltd. ISBN 978-1-74346-004-7. OCLC 1282487089.
- Chapman, Andrew; Dove, Melanie Faith, (photographer.) (2013), Working dogs : a photo documentary of the Australian working dog, The Five Mile Press, ISBN 978-1-74346-160-0
- Chapman, Andrew; Silver, Michael (2011). Woolsheds: a visual journey of the Australian woolshed. Ferntree Gully, VIC: The Five Mile Press Pty Ltd : [distributor] Grantham Book Services Ltd : [distributor] The Five Mile Press : [distributor] David Bateman Ltd : [distributor] PSD Promotions (Pty) Ltd. ISBN 978-1-74248-665-9. OCLC 973519420.
- Chapman, Andrew; Cassidy, Barry (2007), Campaign : a photographic odyssey through Australian political campaigns 1971-2007 (1st ed.), Tandem Publishing, ISBN 978-1-921346-18-7
- Chapman, Andrew Lachlan (2006), The shearers, Lothian Books, ISBN 978-0-7344-0834-1

=== Contributions ===
- McNicol, Adam, (writer of introduction.); Nolen, Luke, (writer of foreword.); Chapman, Andrew, (photographer.); Butcher, Noel, (photographer.); Murcia, Jaime, (photographer.) (2018), They're racing at Manangatang, Ten Bag Press, ISBN 978-0-646-98528-2
- Chapman, Andrew; Challenor, Vince, 1933-, (writer of introduction.) (2017), Quilpie : a pictorial history of an iconic Queensland outpost, Ballarat East, Victoria Ten Bag Press, ISBN 978-0-646-96906-0
- Aust. Conservation Fdn (August 2015), Heartland - Celebrating 50 Years of the Australian Conservation Foundation, Five Mile Press Pty Limited, The (published 2015), ISBN 978-1-76006-583-6
- Chapman, Andrew; Butcher, Noel, (photographer.); Murcia, Jaime, (photographer.) (2013), Camperdown and its cup : heart and soul of country racing, Ballarat East, Victoria Ten Bag Press, ISBN 978-0-646-91098-7
- Hansen, Christine; Griffiths, Tom; CSIRO; Hansen, Christine; Griffiths, Tom (2012), Living with fire : people, nature and history in Steels Creek, CSIRO Publishing, ISBN 978-0-643-10480-8
- Cover of Errington, W; Van Onselen, P (19 December 2011), John Winston Howard: The definitive biography, Melbourne University Press
- Mills, Hanna; Attwood, A. (Alan), 1957-; Murrindindi (Vic.). Council (2010), Beyond age : from the ashes - portraits of resilience, love and loss, Murrindindi Shire Council
- Economou, Nicholas; Ghazarian, Zareh; Economou, Nicholas; Ghazarian, Zareh (18 October 2010), Australian politics for dummies, Wiley Publishing (published 2010), ISBN 978-1-74216-982-8
- MAP Group; State Library of Victoria (2009), Beyond reasonable drought : photographs of a changing land and its people (1st ed.), Five Mile Press in association with State Library of Victoria, ISBN 978-1-74211-096-7
- Images throughout Watson, Don (2008), Recollections of a bleeding heart : portrait of Paul Keating PM, Random House Australia (published 2002), ISBN 978-1-74166-827-8
- MacLeod, Doug; Glusac, Randy, 1953-; Kelso, Geoff (1987), The Southern Cross herald ([Big book ed.] ed.), Macmillan Company of Australia, ISBN 978-0-333-41159-9
- Sadler, R. K; Hayllar, T. A. S; Powell, C. J (1986), Appreciating poetry, Macmillan Education, ISBN 978-0-333-43014-9

== Collections ==
- National Library of Australia
- The State Library of Victoria
- Monash Gallery of Art
- City of Montpellier
- City of Melbourne Art and Heritage Collection
