= Luís Geraldes =

Luis Geraldes
- Born: Luis Geraldes; 15 May 1957 (age 68); Portugal
- Style: Contemporary metaphysical oil painting
- Children: Ticiano Geraldes, Gustavo Geraldes, Maximiliano Geraldes

Luis Geraldes (born May 15, 1957) is a contemporary metaphysical Portuguese artist.

Though Geraldes is best known for his oil painting, he has also produced sculpture, drawings and large ceramic murals. His art has been labelled as metaphysical, mystic symbolism or spiritual. He has also produced many ceramic murals in Sydney, Melbourne and Australia - some of which are on public display at Trafalgar Street metro station in the suburb of Petersham, and Audley Street in Marrickville, Sydney.

== Biography ==
Geraldes was born in 1957 and went to the African country of Angola when he was about 3 years of age. He spent most of his childhood and adolescent years there but in 1975 had to flee the country as a refugee because of the civil war. His long stay in Angola seems to have affected his style of art and he did indeed start painting when he was a boy.

He migrated to Australia in 1985. He became an Australian citizen in 1987 and has taught art and design at the Footscray Institute of TAFE from 1988 to 1990 and at RMIT (Royal Melbourne Institute of Technology) from 1991 to 1995. From 1995, he was a lecturer at the Central Gippsland Institute Art Department.

He now paints full-time and regularly travels between Europe and Australia. His paintings have been selling throughout the world and auction houses, particularly at Christie's Art Auctions in London.

== Oil on canvas ==
Geraldes is best known for his oil painting. His style has dramatically changed over the years, showing how Australian art has influenced his style.

His early interest in western and eastern esotericism and spirituality can also be seen as a prime factor in his subject matter, in which he often paints geometric patterns involving cosmic imagery and symbolism of universal significance. In some of his works the use of the chakra colours can be seen as well as a diagrammatic language of cosmic journeys. In his book Visions of the Esoteric Power he asserts his belief that "art, science, and the spiritual do not exist in isolation".

He explores the third dimension of human beings in relation to the spiritual universe. There are five levels of movement in Geraldes' works: EARTH, AIR, WATER, FIRE and SPIRIT. All of them relate back to the beginning of mankind. Luis follows a two-dimensional path to the inner self by stating in his works the two levels of AIR, and EARTH, which are the most basic levels of man's existence. He then proceeds to lay over the emotions, which men carry within themselves. He uses the blues and greens of water and the warm colors for fire to create a feeling of completeness or as an ordered whole. Superimposed on that, Geraldes states the mystical or esoteric forms from the past and present. By this last statement he puts men in a total form of relationship to the five signs of water, air, fire, earth and spirit. Geraldes is able to put down his innermost involvement in life.

Later Geraldes has been developing an awareness of the relationship of art with its surroundings, developing art works that are concerned with natural disasters, and the shock of the unknown that affects the human condition in relation to all beings. His colors have dramatically changed into reds, oranges and black.

Geraldes' works are represented in the Haifa Museum of Art, Israel; the Chiado (National Museum of Contemporary Art), the Art Museum of the Caixa Geral de Depósitos and the Ismaili Art Collection of the Aga Khan Foundation, all in Lisbon; the Madeira Island Modern Art Museum; Guarda City Art Museum; and other important private and government art collections.
