= Mimmo Cozzolino =

Australian graphic designer and artist

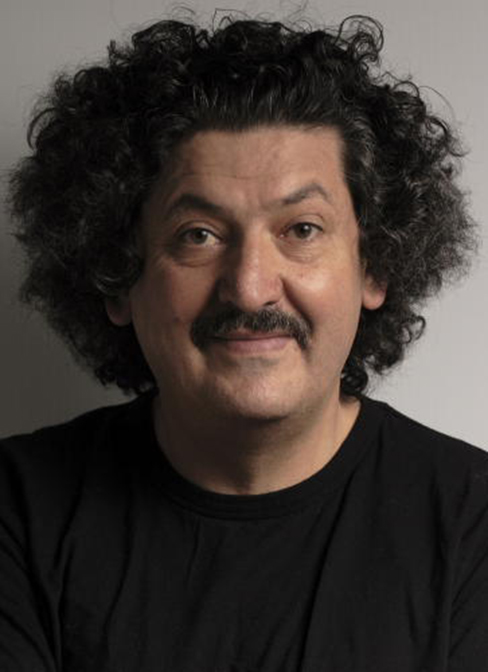
- A self portrait of the Australian designer Mimmo Cozzolino
- Born: 1949 (age 76–77); Ercolano, Naples, Italy
- Occupations: Graphic designer artist photographer archivist educationist
- Spouse: Sue
- Website: mimmocozzolino.com

Mimmo Cozzolino is an Australian graphic designer and photo media artist best known for his gently satirical design and research on Australian historic trademarks.

== Early life ==
Mimmo Cozzolino (christened Domenico but always known as Mimmo) was born 1949 in Ercolano, Naples, Italy. With his father Michele, a printer, and mother Chiara, his family lived on the top floor of a 19th-century palazzo. Cozzolino had three younger brothers; the second died at two years old during the 1950s polio epidemic. Having almost completed second year high school (scuola media), in 1961 he migrated, aged 12, with his family on the Flaminia to Australia where his father hoped to find better work opportunities for the three surviving sons.

== Melbourne and education ==
The Cozzolino family disembarked in Melbourne and were transferred to the Bonegilla Migrant Reception and Training Centre and after his father found work in Melbourne as a letterpress machinist, quickly moved to rented rooms in Kensington and Fairfield then a house in Alphington. In 1965 they commenced purchase of a Housing Commission house in Heidelberg West where Cozzolino attended the Technical School from which he graduated as dux of the school. There he was taught by Winston Thomas who inspired his interest in film animation.

He studied for a civil engineering diploma at Preston College and there met art student Con Aslanis who was later to become his work partner. Having passed the first year of civil engineering and being awarded a scholarship he instead enrolled in 1968 in the design diploma at Prahran College, taking photography as an elective. In his final year in 1970 Cozzolino was awarded $1000 as the winner of the international Sugarmark competition, after coming second in a competition for a milk carton design earlier in the year. In 1972 he returned to complete a semester in the Photography diploma with Athol Shmith and Paul Cox

== Career ==
Cozzolino moved to Sydney in 1971 and started work as studio design assistant to Ricci Eaton at Monad Marketing. He returned to Melbourne for a position as assistant to Eric Maguire, NAS Advertising, before starting his own business in partnership with Con Aslanis. From late 1972 they traded as All Australian Graphics, for which Aslanis created their mascot and brand, the fictitious Greek man/Australian kangaroo hybrid 'Kevin Pappas'. Eschewing the austere international Swiss style, they determined to create design that was distinctly Australian in flavour.

The pair taught design at Phillip Institute of Technology, Bundoora, under Max Ripper and saved to spend 1974 backpacking, mostly together, in Southeast Asia and Europe. On return to Australia in 1975, the Prahran College friends Izi Marmur and Geoff Cook joined the partners' freelance studio renaming it All Australian Graffiti (AAG), joined a few months later at 20/562 St Kilda Road, Melbourne by Neil Curtis and Tony Ward (a former lecturer of theirs at Prahran). In 1976 a further addition to the advertising design and illustration cooperative was Meg Williams, who had been taught by Cozzolino and Aslanis at Phillip institute. Their number made the group the largest illustration design studio in Australia at the time, inviting comparison with the US Push Pin Studios.

For the promotion of their distinctively Greek-Australian profile, the group designed giveaways in the form of postcards, gingerbread biscuits in the shape of 'Kevin Pappas', a poster on an Anzac theme, and one to celebrate the Centenary of The Ashes being played at the Melbourne Cricket Ground in March 1977. That year the group moved to an ex-milk bar at 144 St Kilda Road, St Kilda and their postcards became the material for a book The Kevin Pappas Tear Out Postcard Book which became a bestseller for that year with over 24,000 sales. Cozzolino was photographed in a half-suit of kangaroo legs by Rennie Ellis and after a promotional tour of major cities, the costume made a reappearance on top-rating television. The publicity effected a dramatic increase in business to a point where the pressure caused the group to break up, after which each resumed individual freelancing.

== Symbols of Australia ==
With savings and the financial and moral support of his wife Sue, Cozzolino devoted himself to a book project he had conceived as a student; to assemble a visual encyclopaedic survey of Australian historic trademarks. He trawled state and national library collections and trademark registers to index the symbols of a majority of Australian brands, and with the help of volunteer assistants and a partner in advertising copywriter Fysh Rutherford they produced a design which they planned to self-publish. Only after the team had received viable numbers of pre-orders for hardbacks from mail-outs did Penguin, who had at first rejected the project, make an offer to publish a paperback edition and released Symbols of Australia in 1980, publicising it aggressively. The book included extended introductions by Australian broadcaster and film producer Phillip Adams and historian Geoffrey Blainey.

After both hardback (1,000 copies) and paperback (14–15,000) were sold out within the first four years, the book was re-released in a revised colour edition in 1987.

== Reception ==
Symbols of Australia, which assembles 1700 trade marks from over a century, was hailed as "a decade-long project of graphic archaeology – an illuminating archive that grapples with issues of national cultural heritage and identity" and drew response not only from a graphic design industry still seeking an Australian 'style', but also elicited popular memory of symbols that had registered on the national subconscious as acknowledged by Helen Garner in an editorial piece in The National Times;

"Whoever reads this book will revel in it. Surely Australia must be the only country in the world where as late as 1954 a deodorant would be registered under the name of 'Go-poof.' In 1947 a mouse trap company called its product 'Choke-a-mouse.' I'm envious of Mimmo Cozzolino for the laughs he must have had during this great search of his."

Reviewer Peter Bowler in The Canberra Times greeted the second edition in 1990 as "the ultimate in nostalgia" and Bryan Jeffrey, in the same newspaper, responded as keenly to the anniversary edition;

"Symbols of Australia…offers a collection culled from the past century and beyond which observes our nationalism in everything from visual pun to blatant racism."

The publication won the Best Designed Book award presented by the Australian Book Publishers Association in 1981. The exclusively and distinctively Australian content attracted attention especially around the time of the nation's bicentenary and was reported as having been a "major influence in the revitalising of contemporary Australian visual design". Speaking at a design conference in 1999, Cozzolino recalled:

"When All Australian Graffiti disbanded I decided that I still hadn't quite fitted into Australian society. So my journey continued with Symbols of Australia ... most people seeing it as a nostalgic trip down memory lane. I have never seen it like that, and my unconscious motivation was always quite selfish: to find out about the land of Oz so that I could be more Aussie than the Aussies."

== Design studios ==
After publishing a book that continued to generate interest well after 1980, Cozzolino joined David Hughes, with whom he lectured part time at RMIT to register Cozzolino Hughes Design (CHD) at a studio in South Melbourne, and received corporate design work from Shell. CIS Educational and, with Cozzolino's design of their book series Avanti and Sempre Avanti successfully reconfigured teaching of Italian language in Australia through his incorporation of cartoon characters. From 1986 to 2001 he partnered with Phil Ellett to form Cozzolino Ellett Design D'Vision (CEDD). There, he concentrated on negotiating with clients and management of projects rather than design; 'I don't relish the negotiating skills and organisational approach that you must take to any educational task, and major corporate projects are totally education tasks. It is your responsibility to educate the client, because they don't know your area of skills.'

== Recognition ==
While researching for Symbols of Australia, Cozzolino met Honor Godfrey of The Ephemera Society and in 1987 she invited him to join the committee of the Ephemera Society of Australia (ESA) and contribute design and content to the Ephemera Journal of Australia. He has contributed from his collections to exhibitions, to others' publications and in presentations. In 2019 he was made Honorary Life Member of the ESA.

Through media appearances and in interviews and texts, Cozzolino continues to be consulted for perspectives and commentary on Australian symbols, design, language, and the migrant experience.

In 1987 Cozzolino joined with Wayne Rankin, Stephen Huxley and others in launching a national professional association for graphic designers Australian Graphic Design Association (AGDA). After considerable commitment to the venture and after it was successfully established he stepped down from its leadership in 1992. He was recognised with inclusion in the AGDA Hall of Fame.

== Visual artist ==
From 2002 Cozzolino pursued his interest in art photography, video and the use of the scanner to make imagery of found objects, winning the Leica/CCP Documentary Photography Award with the autobiographical series Arcadia del Sud. He undertook an MFA on the relationship between photography, autobiography and archives. In 2019 he exhibited a series of paintings in mixed media on X-ray film at Tacit Galleries, Melbourne.

== Exhibitions ==
- 2025, 23 August–19 October: Long Exposure: The Legacy of Prahran College. Ballarat International Foto Festival (group)
- 2025, 4 May–25 June: Beyond the Basement, Magnet Galleries, Docklands, Melbourne (group)
- 2025: March–May: The Basement, Museum of Australian Photography(group)
- 2019 Moments, Tacit Galleries, Melbourne (solo)
- 2012 After I die: archives, autobiography, photography, Postgraduate Gallery Monash University, (solo)
- 2011 The changing face of Victoria, Dome Galleries, State Library of Victoria, Melbourne (solo)
- 2010 The Tententen Show, Brunswick Arts Space, Melbourne
- 2009 I'm Here! – Stencil and Street Inspired Art, Ochre Gallery, Melbourne
- 2008 Triangle Project: Taebak Discourse, Taebak, Korea,
- 2008 Celebrating Ramsar, Conference 2008, Gyeongnam ArtMuseum, Korea
- 2005 Sub-Urban Shadow-Plays, Walker Street Gallery, Dandenong (solo)
- 2005 We're a Weird Mob, Post Master Gallery at Australia Post, Melbourne
- 2004 Vivid, fortyfivedownstairs, Melbourne
- 2004 Design: Asian Pacific Design Exchange Exhibition, Design Center Gallery, Osaka, Japan
- 2003 Arcadia del Sud, Bungay Art House, Melbourne (solo)
- 2003 Arcadia del Sud, Leica/CCP 2003 Documentary Photography Award, First Prize
- 2003 Flush: 1990–2003, Band Hall Gallery, Kyneton (solo)
- 1992 The Lie of the Land, Powerhouse Museum, Sydney
- 1987 Just Wot!?, an Exhibition of Visual Poetry, Artists Space Gallery, Melbourne
- 1983 Fotografics from Italy, Seal Club, Melbourne (solo)
- 1981, from 27 February, See/Hear: an Exhibition of Concrete Poetry with Jas H. Duke, Richard Tipping, Peter Murphy, Lindsay Clements, Alex Selenitsch, Anthony Figallo. Niagara Lane Gallery, Melbourne
