= Philip Quirk =

Australian photographer, photojournalist and educationist

Phil Quirk
- Born: Philip Quirk; 11 November 1948 (age 77); Melbourne, Australia
- Education: Prahran College of Advanced Education, COFA, University of New South Wales
- Known for: Photography
- Spouse: Diana Dennison
- Elected: spokesperson for the Society of Advertising, Commercial and Magazine Photographers (ACMP) on copyright issues (1998 - 2004); Chairman of Judges, ACMP Photographer Collection Melbourne in 2000

Philip Quirk (11 November 1948, Melbourne) is an Australian photographer, photojournalist and educationist, known for his specialist imagery of landscape, geographic and documentary photography, and as a founding member of the Wildlight agency.

== Early life and education ==
Philip Quirk was born in Melbourne, Australia on 11 November 1948 to Valentine Quirk, a communications engineer, and mother Phyl. He grew up with a younger sister and older brother in East St Kilda & Caulfield and attended St Kilda Christian Brothers College where he completed Matriculation before briefly studying Business at RMIT.

From the age of 14, he had been a keen surfer around Torquay. However, in a 1969 car accident, he suffered a severely broken arm. Over the year that it took to recover, he started to photograph his surfer friends with a 35mm Pentax Spotmatic and telephoto 500mm F5.5 Takumar lens. Through a friend, Quirk met the Melbourne fashion photographer and stylist couple Bruno & Hazel Benini, who gave him access to their darkroom in which to process his surfing shots. His first published photograph was in the Melbourne Herald for an article on Bells Beach by Victorian surf champion Rod Brooks.

In 1970, Bruno Benini encouraged him to enter Ilford Australia's national competition, the 'Age of Aquarius', for a return trip to London. He was short listed in the final ten, though then disqualified as an amateur. He went on to assist Benini, who arranged a meeting for him with the contest winner Paul Cox, who was lecturer in photography at Prahran College of Advanced Education. With his parents' blessing, Quirk enrolled to study there 1971-3 under Gordon De L’Isle, Athol Shmith and Cox, while continuing as Benini's assistant until 1974.

== Career ==
On graduation, Quirk worked as a photographer for the Southern Cross Newspaper Group. He was also a lecturer at Gordon Institute of Technology (now Deakin University) and at Photography Studies College before moving to Sydney in 1976 to start a freelance photojournalism practice. There, he also taught part-time at Sydney College of the Arts and later was a foundation lecturer at the Australian Centre for Photography. With Grenville Turner and Mark Lang, Quirk worked at a Surry Hills studio run by Anthony Browell and Graham McCarter, before founding the Wildlight Agency. In 1982, he traveled to Wales to research and photograph for a book on the eisteddfod there and in Australia.

=== Wildlight ===
Rick Smolan's A Day in the Life of Australia project through 1981-2, was a catalyst for the origins of Wildlight Photo Agency. Carolyn Johns & Philip Quirk were photographers for the project, Christina De Water a volunteer. During the project, they met and socialised with influential international photographers, many of whom were attached to agencies. Later reencountering some who returned on their way to shoot assignments, they became inspired to establish their own, believing an Australian agency could deliver a better conduit to international magazines and publishers for Australian imagery. In 1984, they met with Oliver Strewe about forming such a cooperative. In 1985, Wildlight Photo Agency opened at 165 Hastings Parade Bondi Beach where they stayed for 10 years. Then they moved to offices at 87 Gloucester Street, The Rocks, and finally to Suite 14, 16 Charles St., Redfern.

From 1990–2003, Quirk was Wildlight's managing director. As part of the agency’s activities between 1997 and 2001, he managed and published Australian Faces & Places Diary, a showcase of Australian reportage & documentary photography of exclusively black-and-white imagery printed in warm duo-tone. The agency, as a photographers' cooperative, was wound up on 13 December 2013, but the image collection is maintained by Andrew Stephenson.

Quirk's photographs were published widely, through Wildlight and freelance, in numerous books, newspapers and magazines including The Sunday Times Magazine, The Observer Magazine (UK), Stern, Der Spiegel, GEO, Time, Newsweek and National Geographic

== Artist ==
Since 1972, Quirk has continually exhibited his early street photography, mature-period landscapes, social documentaries of country people, and portraits of Australian personalities. In reviewing his winning entry, a family portrait The Summerland Family at Warri Warri Gate, in the Fairfax Photography Awards, reviewer Mark Hinderaker commented:

This small, humble, and somewhat curious winner is reminiscent of some of the classic documentary photography of the 1930s. The group is seen, looking through a screen with several vertical divisions sectioning the frame and making each part look like a separate snapshot in a family album: facial resemblances also add another element.

Other subjects include Sidney Nolan and Brett Whiteley. He is represented by Josef Lebovic Gallery in Kensington, and previously by Sydney's Macquarie Galleries before their cessation.

Quirk's work has been secured for most major national public collections, and he was thus represented in On the Edge: Australian Photographers of the Seventies, at San Diego Museum of Art, California in 1995. The photographs drawn from the Philip Morris collection at the National Gallery of Australia. Quirk's imagery of the period often contains wry visual commentary on Australian lifestyles, especially its beach culture.

In order to represent the expansive and often flat Australian landscape, Quirk advanced the use of the panorama. Before 1979, he used a Hasselblad to create panoramas (mostly of landscape subjects) for David Beal's Audience Motivation, a pioneering audio-visual company based in Paddington. The precisely cut medium-format colour transparencies were overlapped so that no line was visible on screen. However, by the mid 1990s, video projection made slide projection redundant. Beal imported the first 6x17 cm camera, the Linhof Technorama 617 into the country and Quirk adopted it in 1981, using a Schneider Super Angulon 90mm f5.6 wide-angle lens. Other Wildlight photographers, Grenville Turner and Mark Lang, also found the camera useful for imagery of outback Australia in which the Agency specialised, before the 6x17 cm format became commonplace, and panoramas clichés of domestic décor.

== Reception ==
Senior Australian photographer Max Dupain highlights Quirk's work in his review of a landmark survey at the Albury Regional Gallery;

Phillip Quirk observes life and it offshoots with a keen eye for elements that seem to fall into exact places which he endows with a twist of wry humour (City to Surf). Look at the interaction of both horses' legs in The Drought. The symmetry is so well-timed and composed"

Critic Anne Latrielle in The Age praised his representations of Australian flora in a show at The Lighthouse Gallery, Prahran;

"Philip Quirk shows the city-dweller stunning aspects of the Australian landscape, from the pastoral calm of river redgums on the Murray River at Barmah to the brooding stillness of alpine forms under snow. Despite two decades of degradation the remaining scenic resources of our country are awe-inspiring. No one interested in our native flora should miss this show."

In her summation of the year 1989 in photography, Beatrice Faust singled out Quirk's wilderness imagery in that exhibition as "exquisitely coloured and [using] natural light in a uniquely creative way." and earlier elaborated;

"Light is the key to Quirk’s fascination. The true subject of his work is not just the furnishings of the landscape but the space and light that gives it life. He uses delicate bounce light from snow to bring out the extraordinarily subtle colours in rocks that most of us would see as black, or catches the horizontal light of sunrise and sunset to bring out the colour latent in grass and foliage."

== Recent career ==
At the end of 2003, after eighteen years, Quirk stood down as the managing director of Wildlight Photo Agency. He is presently living in Sydney and archiving its output. Since his retirement from the agency, Quirk has undertaken a series of speaking engagements, including the 2003 David Moore Lecture, 2004 Walkley Forum, and the gallery floor talks and presentations to Media Arts students.

In 2005, Quirk was commissioned by the NSW Farmers Association to make a series of portraits of farming families and their working life in 13 regions of New South Wales. He followed that with a project during the continuing drought in 2006 in Hay. This broader series documented the landscape, arable farming, and the natural environment with portraits to illustrate the subjects’ relationships with the land, accompanied with text recording their concerns over drought and environmental degradation caused by reduced water flows in the two major river systems in the district.

=== Prahran Legacy Project ===
For the past 10 years or more Philip Quirk has worked with other alumni to raise awareness of the importance of Prahran College of Advanced Education in reshaping the acceptance of photography as an art form. Together with alumni Peter Leiss, and more recently James McArdle, Colin Abbott, Mimmo Cozzolino and curator Merle Hathaway, three exhibitions have been held in 2025 featuring the work of photographers and artist who trained at the Prahran CAE: The Basement: Photography from Prahran College (1968-1981 at the Museum of Australian Photography, Melbourne, focussed on the student work of the 1970s; The Prahran Legacy: Beyond the Basement held at Magnet Galleries, Docklands, Melbourne, showed more contemporary work by both 1970s and 1980s former students; and a larger exhibition Long Exposure: The Legacy of Prahran College showed contemporary work by 50 of the Prahran alumni and was a core exhibition of the 2025 Ballarat International Foto Biennale. Quirk continues to work with the Curatorial Team major projects for 2026 - an exhibition at State Library of Victoria and a substantial book documenting the significance of Prahran CAE and its students who went on to have significant careers with art and photography.

Reflecting on his life in photography Phil muses;

“While my memories of Prahran Days are fading, what is important to me is the place, the lecturers and students who became life-long friends. How fortunate was I to be in an art school in the ’70s where the beginnings of photography as art was recognised and accepted!”

== Photographic educator ==
Amidst his professional work, Quirk continued his teaching activities and was Chairman for Australia and NZ of the World Press Photo Joop Swart Masterclass 1998 - 2013. The event was held in the Netherlands annually and 12 photographers under 31 years of age from around the world are selected to attend. The objective of this competitive award is to advance their professional development. Australian recipients of this award in 2010 included Trent Parke, Jesse Marlow and Adam Ferguson.

Quirk has won industry awards and government grants for his projects which have included a commission from the organisation 'Beyond Empathy' which uses arts intervention to address the deficits experienced by disadvantaged individuals and communities. For them, over 2006/7 Quirk taught and work-shopped photographic portraiture in two communities in New South Wales at Moree and Armidale. These workshops were aimed at young mothers, many of them teenagers, and to male teenagers who were often in trouble with the law. He also made portraits of individuals in the groups.

In advancing his own education, during 2009–2011 Quirk undertook a master's degree by Research, COFA, University of New South Wales.

== Industry representative ==
Quirk has been active in representing his industry, and was spokesperson for the Society of Advertising, Commercial and Magazine Photographers (ACMP) on copyright issues (1998 - 2004); Chairman of Judges, ACMP Photographer Collection Melbourne in 2000; and judge for the Nikon Walkley Foundation Photographic Awards in 2008.

== Lecturer in Photography ==
- Gordon Institute of Technology (now Deakin University)
- Sydney College of the Arts – part-time lecturer
- Australian Centre for Photography – foundation lecturer
- University of Tasmania Art School - guest lecturer
- Charles Sturt University NSW - guest lecturer
- Short course lecturer COFA University of NSW
- Photography Studies College

== Authored books ==
- Quirk, Philip; Feddersen, Melanie. (Designer); Schmelzer, Barbara. (Binder); Digitalpress (Firm) (Printer); Josef Lebovic Gallery (Distributor) (2011), Oxford Street profile, Philip Quirk
- Wildlight Photo Agency (1999), Australian faces & places, Pluto Press, ISBN 978-1-86403-044-0
- Wildlight Photo Agency (1998), Wildlight Sydney, Hardie Grant Books, ISBN 978-1-86498-007-3
- Wildlight Photo Agency (1998), Across the top, Hardie Grant Books, ISBN 978-1-86498-005-9
- Quirk, Philip (1997), Farm : life on the land, William Heinemann Australia, ISBN 978-0-85561-736-3
- Wildlight Photo Agency (1997), Australian faces & places, Pluto Press, ISBN 978-1-86403-038-9
- Quirk, Philip; Yunupingu, Mandawuy; Quirk, Philip (1997), Wild light : images of Australia, Hamlyn, ISBN 978-0-947334-78-9
- Wildlight Photo Agency (1996), Australian faces & places, Pluto Press, ISBN 978-1-86403-031-0
- The Eisteddfods of Australia & Wales, hand-made (edition of 1) 1982

== Contributor to books ==
- Mirams, Jacinta; Boag, Jules; Mirams, Jacinta; Albury City Art Gallery (2009), The history of the National Photography Prize, City of Albury, pp. 22, 23, ISBN 978-0-9578258-2-6
- Park, Andy; Smolan, Rick (1981), A day in the life of Australia, A Day in the life of Australia Pty Ltd, ISBN 978-0-9594244-0-9
- McGregor, Malcolm (1983), A day in the life of New Zealand : Friday March 18th 1983, J.M. McGregor, ISBN 978-0-85921-210-6
- Smolan, Rick; Cohen, David, 1955- (1988), A Day in the life of California, San Francisco Collins Publishers, ISBN 978-0-00-215162-7
- Suich, Max, 1938-; Suich, Jennie (1983), The Great Australian annual, Kevin Weldon & Associates, ISBN 978-0-949708-04-5
- Mayne, Robert (1985), The great Australian wine book, Reed Books, ISBN 978-0-7301-0101-7
- Falkiner, Suzanne (1992), Wilderness, Simon & Schuster, ISBN 978-0-7318-0144-2
- Falkiner, Suzanne; McKay, Lesley (1992), Settlement, Simon & Schuster, ISBN 978-0-7318-0145-9
- Lawrence, Anthony, 1912- (1984), A Salute to Singapore, Times of Singapore, ISBN 978-9971-83-919-2
- The racing game : a tribute to the Australian horse racing industry, Joyce Childress, 1985, ISBN 978-0-9591313-1-4
- Morris, Brian; Wildlight Photo Agency (1988), Australia take a bow : the life, landscape and people, John Ferguson in association with Angus & Robertson, ISBN 978-0-949118-31-8
- O'Shaughnessy, Pieta; Lawton, Jane; McDougall, Dee; Smith, Arnold Pudding; Smith, Arnold Pudding. Stop ringing the submission bells (2000), A traveller's guide to Aboriginal Australia, Desert Images, ISBN 978-0-646-38205-0
- Mary Ann Harrell; National Geographic Society (U.S.). Special Publications Division (1989), Surprising lands down under, Washington, D.C National Geographic Society, ISBN 978-0-87044-719-8
- Faces of Australia, Australia Post - Hardie Grant Melbourne
- Groppe, Brian (1999), Sydney : world-class jewel, Towery Pub, ISBN 978-1-881096-68-9
- Smolan, Rick; Erwitt, Jennifer (1998), One digital day : how the microchip is changing our world (1st ed.), Times Books/Random House in association with Against All Odds Productions, ISBN 978-0-8129-3031-3
- Halliday, James; Coronel, Carlos (1998), Wine atlas of Australia & New Zealand (Revised ed.), HarperCollins, ISBN 978-0-7322-6448-2
- Reader's Digest (Australia) (1999), Reader's Digest book of the road, Reader's Digest (Australia), ISBN 978-0-86449-378-1
- McCulloch, Susan (1999), Contemporary aboriginal art : a guide to the rebirth of an ancient culture, Allen & Unwin, ISBN 978-1-86448-631-5
- Woldendorp, Richard; McDonald, Roger, 1941-; Burdon, Amanda (2003), Wool : the Australian story, Fremantle Arts Centre Press in association with Richard Woldendorp, ISBN 978-1-86368-396-8
- Art Gallery of New South Wales; Pearce, Barry; George, Alec; Pellow, Ashlie (2007), Brett Whiteley Studio, Art Gallery of New South Wales, ISBN 978-1-74174-012-7
- Atkinson, Geoffrey; Quirk, Philip, 1948- (1988), The Australian adventure : the explorer's guide to the island continent, Salem House, ISBN 978-0-88162-361-1
- Phelan, Nancy; Ramsden, Philip; Lang, Mark; Quirk, Philip (1993), Agoston-O'Connor, Susie (ed.), Mosman impressions (Collector's ed.), Mosman: Mosman Municipal Council, ISBN 978-0-646-12772-9

== Newspapers & Magazines ==
=== Australia ===
- The Age,
- The Sydney Morning Herald,
- The Australian, Good Weekend,
- The Bulletin,
- Australian Geographic,
- The Australian Women's Weekly,
- GEO Australia, Outdoor Australia,
- The Australian Way (Qantas in-flight magazine),
- Time,
- Who? Weekly,
- The West Australian Magazine,
- The Independent
- Penthouse, Australia

=== International ===
- The Sunday Times Magazine,
- The Observer,
- The New York Times Magazine,
- Stern,
- Der Spiegel,
- GEO,
- Saison,
- Holiday & Bunte (Germany),
- Forbes,
- Time,
- Newsweek,
- Sports Illustrated,
- Wine Spectator,
- Vanity Fair,
- National Geographic,
- National Geographic Traveler (USA),
- Emphasis Magazines (HK),
- Travel + Leisure,
- Departures, UK,
- Merian DEU,

== Collections ==
- National Gallery of Australia, Canberra
- Art Gallery of New South Wales
- Parliament House Gallery Canberra ACT
- National Library of Australia
- Art Gallery of South Australia
- Queensland Art Gallery
- Artbank Sydney
- Albury Regional Art Gallery
- Horsham Regional Art Gallery
- Monash Gallery of Art Melbourne

== Exhibitions ==
=== Solo ===
- 2011, 24 August–6 September: Oxford Street Profile, Barometer Gallery, Paddington
- 1997 Farm Life on the Land, George Gallery Melbourne', Byron Mapp Gallery Sydney
- 1997, 28 May–15 June: Philip Quirk, The Photographers' Gallery, South Yarra.
- 1989–1992 The People and the Paddocks, Touring Westpac Gallery Melbourne; regional Victoria; Settimana, Italy; Western Australia, N.S.W.
- 1989 Stumbling in the Dark, Lighthouse Gallery Melbourne & Sogestsu Art Centre Japan
- 1989 And The Rains Came, 1982-1984 Touring Indonesia Dept of Foreign Affairs
- 1988 Stumbling in the Dark, Macquarie Galleries Sydney
- 1988 And the Rains Came, Touring NSW, VIC & QLD Regional Galleries
- 1986 Works by Philip Quirk, Intaglio, Prahran
- 1983 Black & White Photographs, touring exhibition Macquarie Galleries, Sydney; The Developed Image, Adelaide; Orange Regional Art Gallery NSW

=== Group ===
- 2025, 23 August–19 October: Long Exposure: The Legacy of Prahran College. Ballarat International Foto Festival
- 2025, 4 May–25 June: Beyond the Basement, Magnet Galleries, Docklands, Melbourne
- 2025: March–May: The Basement, Museum of Australian Photography
- 2011, 29 October–26 November Photographic Panoramas, Josef Lebovic Gallery
- 2010, 29 April–8 May: Head Off - Australian Landscapes by Wildlight Photographers, Mark Lang, Grenville Turner, Philip Quirk, Head On Photo Festival, Paddington Reservoir Gardens, Cnr Oxford Street and Oatley Road, Paddington
- 2010 Candid Camera Australian Photography 50s-70s, Art Gallery of S.A.
- 2010, 31 July–18 April: Creating the look: Benini and fashion photography, Powerhouse Museum, 500 Harris St., Ultimo NSW
- 2010 Bowness Photography Prize, Monash Gallery of Art Melbourne
- 2010 Earth, Flower and Water, Centennial Park Sydney
- 2009 Australian Photography 1858-2009, Josef Lebovic Gallery
- 2008 Industrial Photography, Josef Lebovic Gallery
- 2006 Making Hay, Shear Outback Museum Hay and Span Gallery
- 2005 Australian Landscape & Cityscape, Josef Lebovic Gallery
- 2005 Focus, Danks Street Galleries
- 2005 Face to Face, National Trust SH Ervin Gallery
- 2004 Australian Post-war Photo-documentary, Art Gallery of NSW
- 2004 Australian Photography 1928 – 2004 Josef Lebovic Gallery
- 2000 Fine Photography Collectors List No 85, Josef Lebovic Gallery
- 1995 On the Edge, San Diego Museum of Art USA
- 1994 Critics’ Choice, Art Gallery of NSW
- 1994 We are Family, Art Gallery of NSW
- 1991 Contemporary Colour Photographs, Art Gallery of NSW
- 1988 Shades of Light, Bicentennial Exhibition ANG Canberra
- 1988 CSR Collection, Art Gallery of NSW
- 1988 The Lady Fairfax Memorial Award, Art Gallery of NSW
- 1988 Portraiture made in Australia, Images Gallery
- 1983 The Lady Fairfax Memorial Award, Art Gallery of NSW
- 1983, from 21 April; Australian Street Photography: the 1970s, Australian National Gallery
- 1983 Australian Wilderness Photography, NSW University
- 1982 The Lady Fairfax Memorial Award, Art Gallery of NSW
- 1982 Colour Photography, Newcastle City Gallery NSW
- 1982 On the Beach, Wollongong City Gallery NSW
- 1982 Heatwave, Australian Centre for Photography
- 1981 Recent Acquisitions, Art Gallery of NSW
- 1975-81 Phillip Morris Trust Collection, Touring Australia
- 1975/6 Erwin Art Gallery, Melbourne University
- 1974/5, 21 November–18 January: Aspects of Australian Photography, Inaugural Exhibition, Australian Centre for Photography
- 1973 Student Exhibition, Kodak Gallery Melbourne
- 1972 Ilford Age of Aquarius, finalist, Melbourne

== Representations in compilations of photography ==
- 2016 Carol Jerrems (1949-1980) Josef Lebovic Gallery Catalogue, Collector’s List No 186, two lots; Nos. 49 & 50 Carol Jerrems in "The Journey" a Paul Cox film 1972, p.15
- 2015 Australian & International Photography, Josef Lebovic Gallery Catalogue, Collector’s List No 178, 1 lot; No 137 St Heliers Bay, Auckland, p.27
- 2013 Australian & International Photography, Josef Lebovic Gallery Catalogue, Collector’s List No 164, 1 lot; No 123 Lone Ranger, Melbourne 1973/1995, p.24
- 2012 Australian & International Photography, Josef Lebovic Gallery Catalogue, Collector’s List No 159, two lots; No 158 Fun Parlour, Manly 1977, No 159 Sole Bros Circus Back Door, Sydney, 1978/1995, p.29
- ' Man of the Land,' in Australian Photographic Society (1915), "Australian photography", Nature, 96 (2401), Globe Pub (published 2012): 24–30, Bibcode:1915Natur..96..262J, doi:10.1038/096262a0, ISSN 0004-9964, S2CID 3953976
- 2012 Australian Photography Magazine, profile
- 2011 Philip Quirk, Oxford Street Profile, 6-page catalogue, Josef Lebovic Gallery
- 2011 Josef Lebovic Gallery Panoramas Catalogue, Collector’s List, two lots; No 153, No 123 75th Anniversary of the RAN Sydney Harbour 1986/2005, No 125 Australia Day – Bicentennial Sydney Harbour 1988/2005, p.32
- 2011 Greeting card series from the Art Gallery of NSW Collection
- Robinson, Julie; Art Gallery of South Australia (2010), Candid camera : Australian photography 1950s-1970s, Art Gallery of South Australia
- 2009 Australian Photography 1858-2009 Josef Lebovic Gallery Catalogue
- 2008 Industrial Photography Josef Lebovic Gallery Catalogue, three entries, No 97 Sole Bros. Circus 1978, No 98 Sydney Cityscape 1982 (colour), No 99 Berriwillock The Mallee 1983 (colour), p.18
- Art Gallery of New South Wales; Annear, Judy (2007), Photography : Art Gallery of New South Wales Collection, Art Gallery of New South Wales, ISBN 978-1-74174-006-6
- Conrad, Peter (2003), At home in Australia, Thames & Hudson, ISBN 978-0-500-51141-1
- Imhoff, Robert; Society of Advertising, Commercial and Magazine Photographers (Australia) (September 2002), The Australian photographers collection 7, Society of Advertising, Commercial and Magazine Photographers; Findon, S.Aust. : Bookwise International (distributor) (published 2001), ISBN 978-0-9577442-2-6
- 2001–1997 Wildlight Photo Agency (1996), Australian faces & places, Pluto Press, ISBN 978-1-86403-031-0
- National Gallery of Australia; San Diego Museum of Art (1994), On the edge : Australian photographers of the seventies, from the collection of the National Gallery of Australia, Philip Morris Arts Grant, DGB Publications, ISBN 978-0-937108-18-5
- 1994 Commercial Photography Magazine
- 1990 Postcard Collection, Wildlight
- Newton, Gael; Ennis, Helen; Long, Chris; Crombie, Isobel; Davidson, Kate; Australian National Gallery (1988), Shades of light : photography and Australia 1839-1988, Australian National Gallery : Collins Australia, ISBN 978-0-642-08152-0
- Willis, Anne-Marie (1988), Picturing Australia : a history of photography, Angus & Robertson, ISBN 978-0-207-15599-4
- Kinross-Smith, Graeme, 1936-; Evans, Joyce; Deakin University (1987), Window to Australia : photographs, Deakin University, pp. 17, 23, ISBN 978-0-7300-0498-1
- Le Pechoux, Jean-Marc; Beilby, Peter (1982), The Australian photography yearbook 1983, Nelson and Roscope, ISBN 978-0-00-810488-7
- 1982 Postcards Colour Cosbook
- 1982 The Eisteddfods B&W hand made book by Geoffrey Major
- Art Gallery of New South Wales; Capon, Edmund; Menzies, Jackie (1981), 3 years on : a selection of acquisitions, 1978-1981, Board of Trustees, The Art Gallery of N.S.W, ISBN 978-0-7240-6377-2
- Philip Quirk Interview, cover, in Australian Hi-Fi Publications (1980), Australian Hi-Fi's photographic annual, Australian Hi-Fi Publications, pp. 33–38, ISSN 0727-3622
- Philip Morris (Australia); Mollison, James, 1931- (1979), Australian photographers : the Philip Morris Collection, Philip Morris (Australia)Ltd, ISBN 978-0-9500941-1-3
- Light Vision, Light Quest Publications, 1978, ISSN 0314-867X
- Howe, Graham; Howe, Graham, 1950-; Australian Centre for Photography (1974), New photography Australia : a selective survey, Australian Centre for Photography, ISBN 978-0-909339-00-5
- Australian Centre for Photography; Howe, Graham (1974), Aspects of Australian photography, The Australian Centre for Photography, ISBN 978-0-909339-02-9

== Grants/Scholarships ==
- 2009 Australian Postgraduate Scholarship COFA University of NSW
- 1997–2001 Diamond Press & Australian Paper for Aust’n F & P Diary
- 1988 AWB Ltd for The People & the Paddocks
- 1984 CSR Ltd for The CSR Project Art Gallery of NSW
- 1980 Visual Arts Board Australia Council for The Eisteddfods

== Awards ==
- 1984: The Lady Warwick Fairfax Photography Awards, portrait section
