= Daniel Palmer (art historian) =

Australian historian and academic (born 1971)

Professor Daniel Palmer
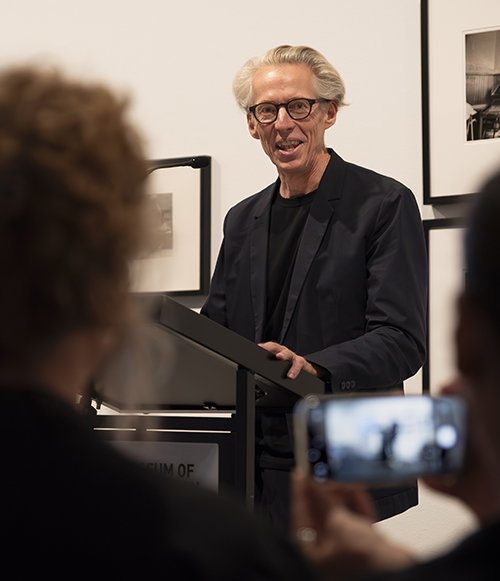
- Daniel Palmer speaks at the Museum of Australian Photography, March 2025
- Born: 1971 (age 54–55); Perth
- Education: University of Western Australia, University of Melbourne
- Occupations: art historian, university lecturer
- Years active: 1993–present
- Employer: RMIT University
- Notable work: Dystopian and Utopian Impulses in Art Making: The World We Want, (2023), Installation View: Photography Exhibitions in Australia 1848–2020 (2021)
- Spouse: Kate Rhodes
- Father: Michael Palmer

Daniel Palmer (born 1971) is an Australian historian, critic, academic and theorist of art. Palmer has explored image, identity, and social interaction. He has held teaching and research roles at the University of Melbourne, Monash University, and RMIT University, where he was Associate Dean of Research and Innovation in the School of Art from 2018 to 2023 and then a professor.

Palmer's research on photomedia focuses on the evolution of photography in the digital age, participatory media, and the collaborative turn in contemporary art. He has published books on photomedia and has advocated for the integration of new media into art history.

== Early life and education ==
Daniel Stephen Vaughan Palmer was born in Perth in 1971 and grew up in Darlington in the foothills of Perth, going to Darlington Primary and Eastern Hills Senior High schools. His father Michael Palmer worked as a radio announcer at the ABC in the 1970s and 1980s.

Palmer briefly studied photography at Edith Cowan University in 1993 as part of a Graduate Diploma in Media Studies. While undertaking a Bachelor of Arts at the University of Western Australia Palmer exhibited a series of portraits of passers-by as part of Perth's Artrage fringe arts festival in 1993. A review by arts writer Jay Gargett of this exhibition at Perth Institute of Contemporary Arts detailed how Palmer photographed strangers, with their consent, on Barrack Street over an 18-month period. Shot with a 35mm camera and standard lens without any post-production manipulation, the unglamorous realism and scientific sharpness impressed Gargett: “The portraits are unusual in many respects. All of the shots were taken outside – yet there's a real studio feel about them, they're deliberately formal.” The review commends Palmer's ability to portray ordinary people with dignity and directness without aestheticising or romanticising subjects, many of whom were initially bewildered by his request to photograph them. Palmer has continued his photography of others, including his portrait of scholar Ian North, in 2014, and on whose work as a photographer Palmer wrote in 2005.

In 1996, Palmer completed Honours in English and History at University of WA, with a thesis supervised by novelist Gail Jones on memory, photography and Proust, for which he won the Katherine Moss Prize for Best Honours Thesis. In December 1996, he held a second solo exhibition at Perth Institute of Contemporary Arts, called Analogical Spectres. Before departing for Melbourne in 1997, his study of graffiti in a Fremantle prison was published and illustrated with his photographs, and was the subject of his paper for Studies in Western Australian History.

Palmer undertook doctoral studies at the University of Melbourne on the topic of participatory media, which he completed in 2003. Palmer's interest in education began in 1993 when he was a teacher of English as a Second Language (ESL) in Spain, and he says he has a commitment to "inclusivity and clarity".

While researching for his PhD, Palmer wrote for Eyeline, over 1998–99, reviews of exhibitions at Melbourne independent and artist-run galleries.

=== Career ===
Palmer volunteered at Melbourne's not-for-profit Centre for Contemporary Photography (CCP), producing a number of catalogue essays and curating an exhibition Click, which was held from May to October 2001 at five Victorian regional art galleries: Bendigo Art Gallery, Geelong Art Gallery, Latrobe Regional Gallery, Mildura Arts Centre Gallery, and Swan Hill Regional Art Gallery. That year he and Kate Rhodes curated Between Place and Non-Place at the Victorian College of the Arts Gallery.

In 2002 he was recruited for the editorial team of the avant-garde Big magazine's issue featuring 20 contributing Australian photographers including Bill Henson, Anne Zahalka and Brook Andrew.

On the occasion of the National Galley of Australia touring shows Refocus: Current Directions in Photography and The Good, the Great & the Gifted, art critic Susan McCulloch consulted with Palmer about the rising popularity of photography exhibitions which he credited to "the influence of pop culture, the ability of photography to tell a story, the size to which photographs can now be enlarged (comparable to big paintings) and its possibilities in terms of expressiveness and presenting a highly personal view."

As a consequence of a 'photography boom' when a Tracey Moffatt print had broken Australian contemporary photography records, he and CCP director Naomi Cass promoted the medium as a canny art purchase. In 2005 he edited Photogenic, a series of essays based on lectures he had organised over 2000–2004 for the Centre for Contemporary Photography, and was its 'Curator of Projects' (1997–2004). His initiatives added digital art to the scope of exhibitions there, but when Kodak Australia closed its Coburg plant he readily attested to the importance of film photography.

== Teaching ==
In 2003, Palmer was appointed part time as lecturer at the University of Melbourne to initiate the institution's first subject focused on the history of photography, a position that was externally funded by Joyce Evans. During this same period, he pioneered a subject on new media art for Melbourne's Master of Art Curatorship degree, and published on internet user interfaces and online identity.

At the end of 2004, Palmer left his position at the CCP and became a lecturer in Art Theory at the Faculty of Art, Design and Architecture at Monash University (MADA) in Caulfield. He continued as a contributor to the CCP's board, exhibition selection committee and as organiser of the Joyce Evans lecture series. In 2016, Ray Edgar quoted him on how photography had changed during the thirty years since the founding of the centre, from a marginal position in the art world and into one equivalent with painting: "It's having the time and space to question what impact changing technology and the plethora of images has on us and what impact we have on it, that makes CCP an important space."

During his time at Monash, Palmer served as Honours Coordinator of Art History and Theory and in 2009 he was promoted to Senior Lecturer, and continued his outreach into the art public, in one case presenting in the Monash University Museum of Art a discussion of "recent trends, curatorial initiatives and artworks using museum collections as their subject or materials." Palmer's 2014 'explainer' on postmodernism was published in The Conversation.

As acting director of the Art History and Theory Program in 2015, Palmer established a Bachelor of Art History and Curating degree, which as Associate Professor he co-coordinated from 2016 onwards. Over 2014–2017 he was Associate Dean, Graduate Research, MADA, Monash University. He was consulted in the Australia Council's 2006 New Media Arts Scoping Study Context Interview and Focus Group. In 2012, he was a participant in one of the School of the Art Institute of Chicago's Stone Summer Theory Institute seminar series convened by art historian James Elkins and devoted to discussing the education of artists.

Palmer joined RMIT University in 2018, serving six years as a senior academic leader until 2023, as Associate Dean of Research and Innovation in the School of Art at RMIT.

== Research ==
Palmer has written on perspectives on photography, video and contemporary art.

Since as early as 2003 Palmer paid attention to the effects that mobile phone technology has had on photography, the way its intimacy, portability, ubiquity, and immediacy produced multimedia content that made it a “participatory” medium in which, as noted by Willms, images are designed for their circulation. Hjorth and others cite a conference paper of that year in which Palmer argued that the dominant “modes of address” of mobile media are as a tool that complicates the distinction between creating and viewing images. Instead of transforming the boundaries between public and private visual spheres, mobile photography seems to intensify the privatization of experience, so that “the Nokia moment is far more intimate than the Kodak moment...” In a 2013 observation quoted by Henning, he adds that the technology encourages repetition and the making of sequences, while Julia Willms uses his observations in 'The Rhetoric of the JPEG,' of mages' inbuilt design for their circulation, which the techno-utopian perspective welcomes as 'democratising' the Internet, to argue that conversely, that facilitates distribution of imagery of actual violence.

Mike Leggett acknowledges that since 2004 Palmer has recognised that those artists working in video, like Leggett himself, were using it not to make entertainment as in the institutions of cinema and television, but to renew language in a relational manner:

Reviewing Darren Toft's 2005 Interzone: Media Arts in Australia, Palmer takes issue with its 'hermetic' Australian focus, and in Berlin, at 'Re:Place' the second international conference on the Histories of Media Art, Science and Technology, 2007, he surveyed the still marginal position of multimedia art in Australia, despite the role that video art played in its development there, and the gradual institutionalisation of media art in the New Media Arts Fund (1998) and Australian Centre for the Moving Image, Melbourne (2002). Brunt notes in Palmer's paper his emphasis on this:

continuing divide between media art and contemporary art. Particularly vivid is his description of the status of the Australian Centre for the Moving Image (ACMI). Palmer argues: "ACMI [...] cast in concrete a split between media art and contemporary art; it was located right next door to the newly relocated and renovated National Gallery of Victoria, which found itself relieved of the pressure to properly represent and collect artists working with video"

Palmer writes after 2012 in Photographies and elsewhere on a 'collaborative turn' in photography reflecting that in other arts, with the rise of digital networked technologies facilitating new forms of photographic cooperation, such as the immediacy of photo-sharing, citizen journalism, participatory sensing projects and community engagement, citing the work of Stephen Willats and Simon Terrill. Oliver, quotes him on photo-sharing such as Flickr as "an ever-accumulating archive of personal visual experience, memory and emotion," while Berry notes his suggestion that a continuously evolving visual feed allows individuals to enhance their personal photo archives with snippets from mainstream media, supporting the process of remembering and commemorating past events. These practices of which Palmer writes, as noted by McDonald, Nwafor, and Ruygt, foreground the collective labour behind photographic acts and challenge the ideology of the solitary author. Palmer argues "that although histories of photography invariably privilege individual figures, contemporary developments should be understood in terms of important precursors such as community photography in the 1970s,” in reference to the Half Moon Photography Workshop, the 1988 Australian documentary project After 200 Years, and Photovoice.

Of Palmer's Photography and Collaboration: From conceptual art to crowdsourcing published in 2017, Cerbarano notes it as foreshadowing the publication Collaboration – A Potential History of Photography in raising of "awareness of photography as a means of relationship" and the power dynamics behind it "rather than as mere representation", and instrumental in this is the convergence of the camera with the network, via the mobile phone, while Hjorth cites Palmer's perception of "co-presence" in camera phones' provision of an "overlay between media, visual culture, and geography." Reference to Palmer's investigation of iPhone evolution is made in discussion to the value of mobile phone images in generating large-scale visual data sets.

For Photography & Culture, one of his contributions covers collaboration in the form of "image-based dialogue" via exchange of photographs. Reviewer Lewis Bush finds Palmer's book on the subject Photography and Collaboration, "as sanguine about the real possibilities of collaborative practices as it is realistic about the limitations ... simply delivering cameras into the hands of subjects is not enough to redress the power balances that ... operate at every stage of the photographic process." On the indexation of images through tagging and other means Cooley points to Palmer's intimation in his writing on the iPhone, "that the representational, or iconic, register of the image—despite the promise of indexicality—is almost beside the point. This is because information trumps representation: a picture appended with metadata becomes less about what it represents than the information it carries." Furthermore, Skopin notes Palmer's finding that landscape photographs are evidence that aid "decision-making processes under international environmental law, particularly for treaties that demand judgments of nature's aesthetic value."

His texts appear also in History of Photography, Philosophy of Photography, Angelaki, Reading Room: A Journal of Art and Culture, and the Australia and New Zealand Journal of Art, for which he has been an editor.

== Critic ==
Palmer's art reviews have appeared in art magazines since 1997, including those in Photofile, Frieze, Art Monthly Australia, Artlink, Art World, Broadsheet, Eyeline, and Art & Australia. Peter Hill in an article promoting creativity and imagination in art texts uses the example of the way Palmer "stretches his language to 'fit' with Brassington's disturbing images" exhibited in the 2004 Biennale of Sydney. Likewise, Gina McColl notes his setting aside reservations about the politics and pretensions around Bill Henson's 2005 NGV retrospective to describe it as "a guilty pleasure". Of Anne Zahalka's Hall of Mirrors, portraits of artists, Age reviewer Robert Nelson agrees with Palmer's comment in his catalogue essay that "'these are portraits of how the artists wish to be seen, ideal ego-projections'."

David Rosetzky typifies Palmer's capacity for identifying major players out of his interest in the interplay between the media of still photography and video and the independent artist-run galleries. Also for Art & Australia, he interviewed James Turrell about his work Within, Without installed that year at the National Gallery of Australia and, seeing the work through a growing interest in the moving image, remarked that "in essence, the work brings the sky down to us as a kind of floating dynamic picture."

== Book publications ==
Palmer's earliest books were published by the Centre for Contemporary Photography in 2005. Twelve Australian Photo Artists co-authored with Blair French, followed and provided accounts of twelve exemplary photographers working in Australia from the early 1980s onward, praised by Andrew Stephens in The Age:

in photography [...] few boundaries have been left intact in the past few decades. Which is why this selection of ‘‘photo artists’’ is impressive [...] It's hard to say quite what unites all this work, but there is certainly something. Perhaps it is a tendency to muse on unsettling emotions, as expressed through the body. It all packs a genuine punch.

Kirker in Artlink journal noted how, for each artist, the authors' "distillation of an individual's practice, written with an assured grasp of methodology, key works, biographical and theoretical drivers and place within the cultural (and sometimes political) landscape, means that one can confidently dispense with much prior literature on them."

In 2012, after co-convening a 2011 Melbourne symposium 'Digital Light: Technique, Technology, Creation', he, Sean Cubitt and Les Walkling wrote a paper contending that prevailing theories overlooked key aspects of analogue-digital transitions, and called for medium-specific analysis and a balanced study of nuances in transitional forms, which Cubitt elucidates elsewhere in the translation of an Ansel Adams landscape through "digital scanning and photolithography, from the sunlight of that day in 1960 to the page as it appears today," and that Taffel considers in relation to their automation. A 2015 book Digital Light that Palmer co-edited with Sean Cubitt and Nathaniel Tkacz, explores the paradoxical concept of "digital light" from multidisciplinary perspectives. This collection brought together commentators on image computation from diverse fields; cinematographer and artist Terry Flaxton, New Media artist Jon Ippolito, video artist Stephen Jones, Canadian academic specialist in computer art Carolyn L. Kane, Melbourne University Professor of Media and Communications Scott McQuire, art historian Christiane Paul, writer and researcher in cyberculture Darren Tofts, co-founder of Pixar, Alvy Ray Smith, and feminist philosopher Cathryn Vasseleu. In Palmer's chapter 'Lights, Camera, Algorithm: Digital Photography's Algorithmic Conditions' he suggests that the sheer volume and fluidity of digital images demand new forms of curation—meta-photography—that rely on computational power to contextualise and authenticate images, as algorithms were coming to condition both the existence and utility of photographs at speeds beyond human capacity.

As co-editor with Anne Marsh and Melissa Miles, also in 2015, he collaborated on The Culture of Photography in Public Space. Reviewer Tara Milbrandt notes his "speculative consideration of Google Street View" in Chapter 11, and "the seeming contradiction between ‘current suspicions of street photographers’ and the popularity of such ‘consumer-oriented online surveillance’". His contribution with Jessica Whyte, "‘No Credible Photographic Interest’: Photography Restrictions and Surveillance in a Time of Terror,” draws attention to the moral anxiety surrounding "stranger danger" and illustrates this with an example from Australia's state-sponsored TV campaign encouraging the public to be suspicious of individuals taking photos of things deemed to lack "credible" photographic value, while Yoshiaki Kai places that in the context of a growing phenomenon of suspicion of street photographers.

In an Australian Research Council funded research project, Palmer with Martyn Jolly assembled incrementally online a chronology of exhibitions of photography in Australia. The outcome was Installation View. Palmer's 2021 essay for The Conversation provides an overview. The book was widely reviewed, including by critics Catherine De Lorenzo (Adjunct A/Professor, MADA, Monash University) and Geoffrey Batchen who acknowledge its value (though criticise the design idiosyncrasies of COVID-era publication) but bemoan a missed opportunity for a survey of the history of curatorship itself. Collectively, the selected exhibitions discussed in Installation View reflect broader view of social and political evolution in Australia. The survey that the co-researchers conducted enabled Palmer's more granular chronology applied in his chapter in the Museum of Australian Photography publication The Basement devoted to the contexts of foundational and influential teaching of photography for artistic purpose at Melbourne's Prahran College.

Reviewing the 2023 volume Dystopian and Utopian impulses in art making co-edited by Palmer with Grace McQuilten, Drudgeon finds it engaging with Haraway and Segarra's, El món que necessiteman (2019) from an Asia-Pacific perspective to consider an "intimate relationship between art and crises" to consider how artistic practices "highlight the dystopian dimension of both our daily lives and a not-so-distant future".

In their 2024 article in AI and Society, Herrie, Maleve, Philipsen, and Staunæs, consider the role of user proficiency in the context of AI-driven photorealistic image generation which Palmer and Sluis discuss in Media Theory. They observe that disparities among users continue to emerge based on expertise—especially a solid grasp of photographic principles. While generative AI broadens access to image creation, it does not eliminate differences in ability; rather, it shifts them. Effective use of prompts still demands specialized knowledge and strong text-based communication skills. This suggests that the interplay between automation, user engagement, and technical practices remains fluid and evolving.

== Recognition ==
Palmer is a member of the International Association of Art Critics (AICA) and conference convenor for The Art Association of Australia and New Zealand. He is an associate of the journal Art & Australia and served as on the editorial board of the Australia and New Zealand Journal of Art.

In 2005, Palmer was granted a State Library of Victoria Creative Fellowship to research Australian fashion photography from 1900 to 1930. He is an Affiliate of the Australian Research Council Centre of Excellence for Automated Decision-Making & Society (ADM+S) and has been the recipient of Australian Research Council grant 'Dictionary of Australian Artists Online', and Chief Investigator on the ARC Discovery Projects; ‘Genealogies of Digital Light’ (2008–11) with Sean Cubitt and Les Walkling; ‘Curating Photography in the Age of Photosharing‘ (2015–2018) with Martyn Jolly; and ‘Digital Photography: Mediation, Memory and Visual Communication’ (2020–22) with Scott McQuire, Nikos Papastergiadis, Sean Cubitt and Celia Lury; and an ARC Linkage Project ‘Photography as a Crime’ (2009–2012) with Anne Marsh, Melissa Miles, Mark Davison and the Centre for Contemporary Photography.

== Personal life ==
Palmer's partner is State Library of Victoria curator Kate Rhodes with whom he also writes, and they have two children.

== Publications ==
=== Books ===
- Palmer, Daniel; Centre for Contemporary Photography (2001). Click. Fitzroy: Centre for Contemporary Photography.
- Palmer, Daniel, ed. (2005). Photogenic. Fitzroy, Victoria: Centre for Contemporary Photography. ISBN 978-0-9751371-1-6.
- Palmer, Daniel (2008). Participatory media : visual culture in real time. Saarbrücken, Germany: VDM Verlag Dr. Müller. ISBN 9783639056150. OCLC 277172214.
- French, Blair; Palmer, Daniel (2009), Twelve Australian photo artists, Piper Press, ISBN 978-0-9751901-7-3
- Palmer, Daniel; Hjorth, Larissa (2010). Still mobile : Larissa Hjorth. Korea: Gyeonggi Museum of Modern Art. ISBN 9788989553625. OCLC 1159219389.
- Marsh, Anne; Miles, Melissa; Palmer, Daniel (2015). The culture of photography in public space (1st ed.). Intellect Books. ISBN 978-1-78320-460-1.
- Cubitt, Sean; Palmer, Daniel; Tkacz, Nathaniel (2015). Digital Light. Fibreculture Books. London: Open Humanities Press. ISBN 978-1-78542-000-9.
- Palmer, Daniel (2017). Photography and Collaboration: From conceptual art to crowdsourcing (1st ed.). Bloomsbury Academic. ISBN 978-1-4742-3348-4.
- Jolly, Martyn; Palmer, Daniel (2021). Installation View: Photography Exhibitions in Australia (1848–2020). Melbourne, Australia: Perimeter Editions. ISBN 9781922545008.
- McQuilten, Grace (2023). Palmer, Daniel; McQuilten, Grace (eds.). Dystopian and Utopian impulses in art making : the world we want. Intellect Ltd. ISBN 978-1-78938-654-7.
- Palmer, Daniel; Sluis, Katrina; Bennett, Alison; Hulbert, Shane (2024). Execute_photography. RMIT Culture. ISBN 978-0-648-05293-7.

=== Selected chapters ===
- Palmer, Daniel (2001). "Introduction". In Frajman, Helen (ed.). The Bank book. Balaclava, Victoria: M.33. ISBN 9780957955301.
- Palmer, Daniel (2004). "Medium without a memory: Australian video art". In Glass, Alexie; Tutton, Sarah (eds.). I thought I knew but I was wrong: New Video Art from Australia. Melbourne: Asialink/Australian Centre for the Moving Image. pp. 37–41. OCLC 224674323.
- Palmer, Daniel; Gill, Simryn; Carter, Jenni (2006). Simryn Gill: 32 volumes. Fitzroy, Vic.: Centre for Contemporary Photography. ISBN 9780975137123. OCLC 225713048.
- Palmer, Daniel (November 2007). "Media Art and Its Critics in the Australian Context" (PDF). Media Art Histories Archive.
- Palmer, Daniel; Rhodes, Kate (2010). "Independent Australian Fashion". In Maynard, Margaret (ed.). Berg encyclopedia of world dress and fashion. Australia, New Zealand and the Pacific islands. Berg. ISBN 978-1-84788-856-3.
- Palmer, Daniel (2012). "6. iPhone Photography: Mediating Visions of Social Space". In Hjorth, Larissa; Burgess, Jean; Richardson, Ingrid (eds.). Studying mobile media : cultural technologies, mobile communication, and the iPhone. Routledge research in cultural and media studies, 39. New York, NY: Routledge. pp. 85–97. ISBN 9780415895347.
- Palmer, Daniel (2013). "The Rhetoric of the JPEG". In Lister, Martin (ed.). The photographic image in digital culture (2nd ed.). London; New York: Routledge, Taylor & Francis Group. ISBN 978-0-415-53527-4.
- Palmer, Daniel (2013). "Redundant Photographs: Cameras, Software and Human Obsolescence". In Rubinstein, Daniel; Golding, Johnny; Fisher, Andy (eds.). On the Verge of Photography: Imaging Beyond Representation. Birmingham, United Kingdom: ARTicle Press. pp. 49–68. ISBN 9781873352021.
- Palmer, Daniel (2013). "Photography, Technology and Ecological Criticism: Beyond the Sublime Image of Disaster". In Lester, Libby; Hutchins, Brett (eds.). Environmental Conflict and the Media. Peter Lang. p. 77. ISBN 9781433118937.
- Palmer, Daniel (2015). "Google Street View and Photography in Public Space". In Marsh, Anne; Miles, Melissa; Palmer, Daniel (eds.). The culture of photography in public space. Critical photography series. Bristol: Intellect Books. ISBN 978-1-78320-459-5.
- Palmer, Daniel (2018). "Decentering the photographer: authorship and digital photography". In Duden, Mark; Tormey, Jane (eds.). Routledge companion to photography theory. Abingdon, Oxon: Taylor & Francis. ISBN 9781138845770.
- Palmer, Daniel (2018). "Ian North: Canberra suite (with Coda)". In Zagala, Maria (ed.). Ian North : art, work, words. Adelaide, South Australia: Art Gallery of South Australia. ISBN 9781921668371.
- Palmer, Daniel (2019). "Redundancy In Photography". In Wells, Liz (ed.). The Photography Reader: History and Theory (2nd ed.). Abingdon, Oxon & New York, NY: Routledge. ISBN 9780415749176.
- Palmer, Daniel (2019). "Photography as Indexical Data: Hans Eijkelboom and Pattern Recognition Algorithms". In Brett, Donna West; Lusty, Natalia (eds.). Photography and Ontology: Unsettling Images. Routledge. ISBN 9781032338941.
- Palmer, Daniel; Warren, Kate (2019). Loreck, Janice; Monaghan, Whitney; Stevens, Kirsten (eds.). Screening Scarlett Johansson : Gender, Genre, Stardom (1st ed.). Springer International Publishing Imprint - Palgrave Macmillan. pp. 121–144. ISBN 978-3-030-33196-2.
- Palmer, Daniel (2020). "Mobile Photography and Artistic Activism in the 'Instagram Museum'". The Routledge Companion to Mobile Media Art (ebook ed.). Routledge. ISBN 9780429242816.
- Annear, Judy; Palmer, Daniel (2015). "The Self-portrait in Australian photography". The photograph and Australia. City of Sydney Archives.
- Palmer, Daniel (2022). "The Social Life of Contemporary Photography". In Toh, Charmaine (ed.). Living Pictures: Photography in Southeast Asia (ebook ed.). National Gallery Singapore. pp. 342–345. doi:10.1353/book.110798. ISBN 978-981-18-6543-5.
- Palmer, Daniel (2025). "The gallery seen". The Basement: Photography from Prahran College (1968–1981) (1st ed.). Museum of Australian Photography. pp. 45–65. ISBN 9781876764883.
- Najdowski, Rebecca; Palmer, Daniel (2025). "Speculative Visions: Machine Learning, Photography and the Climate Crisis". In Binns, Daniel; Najdowski, Rebecca (eds.). Confronting the Climate Crisis: Activism, Technology and Ecoaesthetics. Palgrave Studies in Media and Environmental Communication (1st ed. 2025 ed.). Cham: Springer Nature Switzerland. pp. 235–254. ISBN 978-3-031-89606-4.

=== Selected articles ===
- Palmer, Daniel (September 1998). "Meri Blazevski, Leslie Eastman, David Noonan". Eyeline. 37: 38–39. ISSN 0818-8734 – via Informit.
- Palmer, Daniel (September 1998). "Real life is everywhere, by James Lynch, Grey Area (Art Space Inc.), Melbourne". Eyeline. 37. ISSN 0818-8734 – via Informit.
- Palmer, Daniel (December 1998). "Dis/appearanee: Waiting room #4 (Nullbild), by Charles Anderson and Paul Carter, Centre for Contemporary Photography, Melbourne and Anna Schwartz Gallery, Melbourne". Eyeline. 38: 38–39. ISSN 0818-8734 – via Informit.
- Palmer, Daniel (December 1998). "Review of: Sad art, by Alex Gawronski, First Floor, Melbourne". Eyeline. 38: 45–46. ISSN 0818-8734 – via Informit.
- Palmer, Daniel (March 1999). "Reviews: The melbourne festival: Visual arts program". Eyeline. 39: 35–37. ISSN 0818-8734 – via Informit.
- Palmer, Daniel (September 1999). "Review: Hauler me, by John Meade, Sutton Gallery, Melbourne". Eyeline. 40: 48. ISSN 0818-8734 – via Informit.
- Palmer, Daniel (December 1999). "A Future Aesthetic". Film-Philosophy. 3 (1) film.1999.0012. doi:10.3366/film.1999.0012. ISSN 1466-4615.
- Palmer, Daniel (April 2001). "Do not touch prints [Still print is the focus of this journal issue.]". Photofile (62): 3. ISSN 0811-0859.
- Palmer, Daniel (April 2001). "Between place and non-place: the poetics of empty space [Artists working with the genre of empty space photography.]". Photofile (62): 46–51. ISSN 0811-0859.
- Palmer, Daniel (April 2001). "Shorts, introduction [A selection of photographs by various artists.]". Photofile (62): 23–32 – via Informit.
- Palmer, Daniel (December 2002). "The order of things: the edition and the series in contemporary photomedia". Photofile (67): 18–22. ISSN 0811-0859.
- Palmer, Daniel (2003). "Nick Mangan: In the crux of the matter | Sutton Gallery, Melbourne, 24 September – 22 October 2003". Eyeline. 53.
- Palmer, Daniel (September–November 2004). "Medium without Memory: Australian Video Art". Broadsheet. 33 (3): 20–21.
- Palmer, Daniel (March 2004). "Review of: In the crux of matter, by Nick Mangan, Sutton Gallery, Melbourne, 24 September – 22 October 2003". Eyeline. 53: 42. ISSN 0818-8734 – via Informit.
- Rhodes, Kate; Palmer, Daniel (June 2004). "So you wanna be a fashion photographer?". Photofile: 24–29. ISSN 0811-0859 – via Informit.
- Palmer, Daniel; Rhodes, Kate; Haskins, Sam (June 2004). "Interview with fashion photographer Sam Haskins by Daniel Palmer and Kate Rhodes". Photofile (71): 20–23. ISSN 0811-0859 – via Informit.
- Palmer, Daniel (Summer 2004). "2004: Australian Culture Now". Art & Australia. 42 (4): 196–97 – via art+australia.
- Palmer, Daniel (Spring 2005). "Andy Warhol's Time Capsules". Art & Australia. 43 (1): 16–17 – via art+australia.
- Palmer, Daniel (Winter 2006). "Book reviews: 'Interzone: Media Arts in Australia' by Darren Tofts, Craftsman House/Thames & Hudson, Melbourne, 2005". Art & Australia. 43 (4): 606 – via art+australia.
- Palmer, Daniel (Spring 2006). "A melancholy spectacle. Visual Art at the 2006 Commonwealth Games". Art & Australia. 44 (1): 10–11 – via art+australia.
- Palmer, Daniel. "Reviews: Anna Munster, Materializing New Media: Embodiment in Information Aesthetics. Hanover: Dartmouth College Press/University Press of New England, 2006 ISBN 1 584655 58 5". Australia and New Zealand Journal of Art: 99–103. doi:10.1080/14434318.2006.11432776 – via Taylor & Francis.
- Palmer, Daniel; Rose, Julie (2007). Hall of mirrors : Anne Zahalka, portraits 1987-2007. Fitzroy, Victoria: Centre for Contemporary Photography. ISBN 9780975137154. OCLC 180036194.
- Palmer, Daniel (June 2007). "The Object of Things: [Daniel Von Sturmer's small video sculptures for the Venice Biennale 2007. Three Australian artists -Norrie, Susan; Von Sturmer, Daniel and Morton, Callum – have been selected to represent Australia at the Venice Biennale 2007. Also exhibiting are photographer Laing, Rosemary; video artist Gladwell, Shaun and installation artist Capurro, Christian]". Broadsheet. 36 (2). Contemporary Art Centre of South Australia: 79–81. doi:10.3316/ielapa.200706737 (inactive 1 July 2025). OCLC 7128449547.
- Palmer, Daniel (Spring 2007). "Australia at the Venice Biennale: Disaster and other impressions". Art & Australia. 45 (1) – via art+australia.
- Palmer, Daniel (2007). "Guggenheim Ga Ga". Art & Australia. 45 (2): 291 – via art+australia.
- Palmer, Daniel (April 2008). "Daniel von Sturmer, the image scientist [Although he now works with video, von Sturmer trained as a painter and remains fascinated by 'the luscious quality of paint being freshly poured out of the can']". Art World (38). East Sydney: BS Media Ltd. OCLC 7128861538.
- Palmer, Daniel: "Contemplative Immersion: Benjamin, Adorno & Media Art Criticism," in: TRANSFORMATIONS, Issue No. 15, November 2007
- Palmer, Daniel (Autumn 2009). "Optimism (review of Contemporary Australia: Optimism, Gallery of Modem Art, Brisbane, 15 November 2008 – 22 February 2009)". Art & Australia. 46 (3): 509 – via art+australia.
- Palmer, Daniel; Whyte, Jessica (2010-12-01). "No Credible Photographic Interest: Photography restrictions and surveillance in a time of terror". Philosophy of Photography. 1 (2): 177–195. doi:10.1386/pop.1.2.177_1. ISSN 2040-3682.
- Palmer, Daniel (2010-08-23). "Emotional Archives: Online Photo Sharing and the Cultivation of the Self". Photographies. 3 (2): 155–171. doi:10.1080/17540763.2010.499623. ISSN 1754-0763.
- Palmer, Daniel (October 2011). "Art on the run: Ubiquitous mobility and the camera phone". Artlink (31): 31. ISSN 0727-1239. OCLC 7128506787.
- Palmer, Daniel (March 2011). "In Naked Repose: the face of candid portrait photography". Angelaki. 16 (1): 111–128. doi:10.1080/0969725X.2011.564367. ISSN 0969-725X.
- Palmer, Daniel (Autumn 2011). "The difficulty of being oneself: David Rosetzky's moving image portraits". Art & Australia. 48 (3): 486–493. ISSN 0004-301X – via art+australia.
- Palmer, Daniel (March 2013). "A Collaborative Turn in Contemporary Photography?". Photographies. 6 (1): 117–125. doi:10.1080/17540763.2013.788843. ISSN 1754-0763.
- Palmer, Daniel (Winter 2013). "artreview: Candice Breitz: The Character". Art & Australia. 50 (4): 652 – via art+australia.
- Palmer, Daniel (August 2013). "Review of: 'As far as I know', by Katrin Koenning and Jessie Boylan, Colour Factory Gallery, 4-27 July 2013". Arena Magazine. Fitzroy, Vic.: Arena Publications: 15. ISSN 1039-1010. OCLC 7128834822.
- Palmer, Daniel (2014). "Photography as Social Encounter: Three Works by Micky Allan, Sophie Calle and Simryn Gill". Australia and New Zealand Journal of Art. 14 (2).
- Cubitt, S.; Palmer, D.; Walkling, L. (2015). "Enumerating photography from spot meter to CCD". Theory, Culture & Society. 7 (8): 245–265. doi:10.1177/0263276412472377.
- Palmer, Daniel (March 2015). "Paris photo 2014". Photofile. ISSN 0811-0859. OCLC 7128376942.
- Palmer, Daniel (June 2015). "Trent Parke: The black rose". Artlink. 35: 92. ISSN 0727-1239. OCLC 7128812960.
- Palmer, Daniel (September 2016). "Review: Material presence. "Emanations' at Govett-Brewster". Art Monthly Australia (292): 56–59, 6.
- Jolly, Martyn; Palmer, Daniel (2019-01-02). "Salon Pictures, Museum Records, and Album Snapshots: Australian Photography in the Context of the First World War". History of Photography. 43 (1): 60–83. doi:10.1080/03087298.2019.1607417. ISSN 0308-7298.
- Palmer, Daniel (2019-07-03). "Corresponding Associations: the Poetics and Limits of Photography as Dialogue". Photography and Culture. 12 (3): 321–335. doi:10.1080/17514517.2019.1641281. ISSN 1751-4517.
- Palmer, Daniel (2021-01-02). ""Asian" photography in Australia". Photographies. 14 (1): 109–118. doi:10.1080/17540763.2020.1856713. ISSN 1754-0763.
- Palmer, Daniel; Jolly, Martyn (2021-09-02). "Friday essay: 10 photography exhibitions that defined Australia". The Conversation.
- Palmer, Daniel (13 April 2021). "Shoeshops, Tailors, TV Repairs: A Photographic Homage to Melbourne's Vanishing Small Businesses is a Form of Time Travel". Evening Report. ProQuest 2644659577.
- Palmer, Daniel; Sluis, Katrina (2024-06-11). "The Automation of Style: Seeing Photographically in Generative AI". Media Theory. 8 (1): 159–184. doi:10.70064/mt.v8i1.1072. ISSN 2557-826X.
