= Naomi Cass =

Australian art curator and educator

- Born: 1957 (age 68–69); Melbourne
- Education: University of Melbourne,
- Occupations: Arts administrator, Gallery Director, Curator, Art writer, Educator
- Years active: 1984>
- Notable work: Rosetzky, David; Cass, Naomi, (curator.); McFarlane, Kyla, (curator.); Centre for Contemporary Photography (Fitzroy, Vic.) (2013). True self : David Rosetzky : selected works. Centre for Contemporary Photography. ISBN 978-0-9872933-8-1.
- Parents: Dr Moss Cass (father); Shirley M. (née Shulman) (mother)

Naomi Noel Cass is an Australian art curator, writer and critic, educator and administrator who has worked at the Jewish Museum of Australia, the Caulfield Arts Centre, the Australian Centre for Contemporary Art, and the University of Melbourne's Grainger Museum and George Paton Gallery. Cass lectured in visual arts for the universities of Melbourne and RMIT. She was director of the Centre for Contemporary Photography, Melbourne from 2003-2018 and at the Castlemaine Art Museum from 2019–2025.

== Early life and education ==
Cass was born in Melbourne in 1957, the daughter of Shirley Marion (née Shulman), and Dr Moss Cass who had served on the front bench in the Gough Whitlam government as one of the world’s first environment ministers.

Cass became involved in music and design projects and after completing her honours degree at the University of Melbourne, worked as a curator and writer for exhibitions and public programs for the Jewish Museum of Australia, the Caulfield Arts Centre, and the Australian Centre for Contemporary Art, and contributed museum criticism for the Herald Sun. A collector, in 1984 Cass loaned her Vivienne Shark LeWitt 1983 work China Boy in the Desert. The Dead Girl. for Australian Visions at the Solomon R. Guggenheim Museum, New York.

== Career ==
=== Arts administrator ===
From 1984, Cass served in arts and administrative roles, first as curator of the University Gallery, University of Melbourne, while for the University's George Paton Gallery she organised three public lectures by visitors to the Sydney Biennale; Critical Issues in Postmodernism by Sarah Kent, Progress in Art, by Thomas McEvilley and Joseph Beuys by Johannes Cladders. In an interview conducted by James Button with Cass in 1987 about her Melbourne University Gallery exhibition Fears and Scruples, she explained it was a “cross section of art in Melbourne from 1850 to 1986” presenting old and new paintings side by side in defiance of the linear lock-step of traditional art histories, so that it could be seen how a newer work can throw light on an older. Reviewer Robert Rooney remarked that he had only become aware of the importance of Rosslynd Piggott's work through her inclusion by Cass in this show.

In 1988 Cass was the subject of a petition by Melbourne artists including Tony Clark, Geoff Lowe, Howard Arkley and David O'Halloran calling for the sacking of the Australian Centre for Contemporary Art director Richard Perram and appointment of Cass in his place.

Cass was a lecturer in the Department of Visual and Performing Arts, University of Melbourne for 1990 while directing the art dealership Deutscher Brunswick Street, and joined the Bureau of Immigration, Multiculturalism and Population Research in the Department of Immigration as Public Affairs Officer from 1995 to 1997.

Returning to the University of Melbourne, Cass was Cultural Development Officer from 1997 to 2001, during which time the National Gallery of Victoria made her one of the five selectors for the second $100,000 Contempora5 biennial art prize, and she curated exhibitions for the Australian Centre for Contemporary Art, and recruited six artists to research and make works around the history of St Kilda gallery and later-day mansion. Working in the University's Grainger Museum collection, Cass confronted controversial alterations and omissions made to it that were contrary to Percy Grainger's intention; "...every aspect of the current texture of the museum postdates Grainger's direct involvement." From the Museum, she produced two programs of contemporary art and music for the Melbourne International Festival; The Many Faces of Percy Grainger (1997) and Electric-Eye (1998), and for the city's Fashion Week staged in the George Paton Gallery an exhibition of men's clothing Male Order, inspired by Grainger's unconventional dress for which Cass "asked designers to think about how much the garment or what people wear affects or makes people's identity [and] to come and do their research and be stimulated by the university's Percy Grainger collection."

For the Jewish Museum of Australia as a contract curator in 1996, Cass assembled artists's responses to the theme The Wandering Jew, to which reviewer Robert Nelson responded that "with a fine catalogue containing an insightful and imaginative essay by Naomi Cass...the vision for this exhibition is subtle, [but] the same can't be said for some of the art." For the Museum in the year following Cass assembled in traditional embroidered and decorated fabrics for Material Treasures, explaining that "To beautify a textile is an act of honouring God," but observing that "very often you can't distinguish between Jewish and Muslim objects, because when you're comfortable you don't need to identify yourself or to be identified. There was a free flow of imagery and means between Jewish and Muslim communities."

Cass was Executive Officer, NETS Victoria (National Exhibitions Touring Support) from 2001–2003.

=== Gallery director ===
==== Centre for Contemporary Photography (2004–2018) ====
In 2004 Cass was appointed as Director of Melbourne's Centre for Contemporary Photography, and in 2005, oversaw the relocation of CCP to purpose-designed premises. Under her leadership, media shown there was expanded to include video; the work of Guy Ben-Ner for example, while The Age noted traditionalist documentary photographers' objections to designer Mimmo Cozzolino's winning the Leica CCP documentary award with 'blurry' photographs. She continued the Centre's fundraiser, the CCP Salon, established by former director Susan Fereday in 1992, the largest open-entry award for photography and video in Australia, and offering for sale donations by major photo-artists including Pat Brassington. Through 2009 she initiated and worked on the first National Indigenous Photographers’ Forum, a major survey Inland, of the work of Simryn Gill for the Melbourne Festival, and through NETS Victoria that year organised a touring exhibition of Anne Zahalka's portraits, of whose approach Nash confirms Cass's observation that "the burden of scrutiny is evenly distributed across the sitter and the setting."

A 2011 exhibition In Camera and In Public was welcomed by reviewer Doug Hall for framing subversion, dissent and paranoia; Andrew Stephens quoted Cass's perception of people's "anthropological instinct" for looking at other humans which, he notes, the camera made more possible for multiple purposes, benign or sinister; while for Robert Nelson the show raised questions of photography's relation to the truth. Katherine Biber of the Faculty of Law at the University of Technology Sydney remarked on how the show highlighted diverging consequences of candid photography: that "it has taught us things we might never have known (it is evidentiary)", and that (quoting Cass) it has also “hurt, harmed and destroyed people”. Cass's curation explored transgression and intrigue in ASIO de-classified photos and footage, Percy Grainger's photographs of his welts from self-flagellation, and works by Denis Beaubois, Luc Delahaye, Cherine Fahd, Percy Grainger, Bill Henson, Sonia Leber and David Chesworth, Walid Raad, and Kohei Yoshiyuki, which was also presented as part of the Melbourne Festival, as was, in 2013, the show of Wendy Ewald's collaborations with children. Earlier, responding to a 2007 report that the Melbourne Camera Club had received complaints that parents "photographing their children playing sport were being persecuted by overprotective parents afraid of abuse", Cass noted that artist-photographers' response was to stage their pictures of minors, and in 2008, Cass had defended Polixeni Papapetrou in the controversy surrounding the artist's recruitment of her daughter to pose in tableaux, saying; "Olympia is engaged with a very loving, child-centred and intellectual family. There is no sexualisation of children in Poli's work, and to suggest so is ignorant."

For the CCP Cass secured an exhibition of British artist Richard Billingham in 2012, and in 2013 she co-curated the touring survey True Self: David Rosetzky Selected Works with Kyla McFarlane, with whom she also coordinated in 2014 The Sievers Project with Jane E. Brown, Cameron Clarke, Zoe Croggon, Therese Keogh, Phuong Ngo, Meredith Turnbull responding to works by Wolfgang Sievers, and on the same principle curated Crossing Paths with Vivian Maier to juxtapose the works of mid-century American Maier with contemporary Australian photography, performance, and video.

Cass was on the judging panel with Andrew Sayers AM for the National Portrait Gallery's first photographic portrait prize, selected the finalists for the Josephine Ulrick and Win Schubert Photography Award Exhibition in 2009, awarded Tamara Dean the 2011 $20,000 Olive Cotton Award, and in 2017 joined Mike Trow, picture editor for British Vogue as judge for the Sony World Photography Awards.

When the Centre for Contemporary Photography, then 30 years old, lost government funding through the Key Organisations program and the Visual Arts and Crafts Strategy, Cass predicted that the loss of finance ought not to be "fatal". Eight years later however, withdrawal of funding from both Creative Australia and Creative Victoria left it with no staff and only the new director Daniel Boetker-Smith, appointed in 2022, remaining, and it had to move from the 404 George Street building to a smaller space at the not-for profit arts precinct Collingwood Yards which also closed after a brief interval in 2024 after which the gallery has remained homeless in 2025.

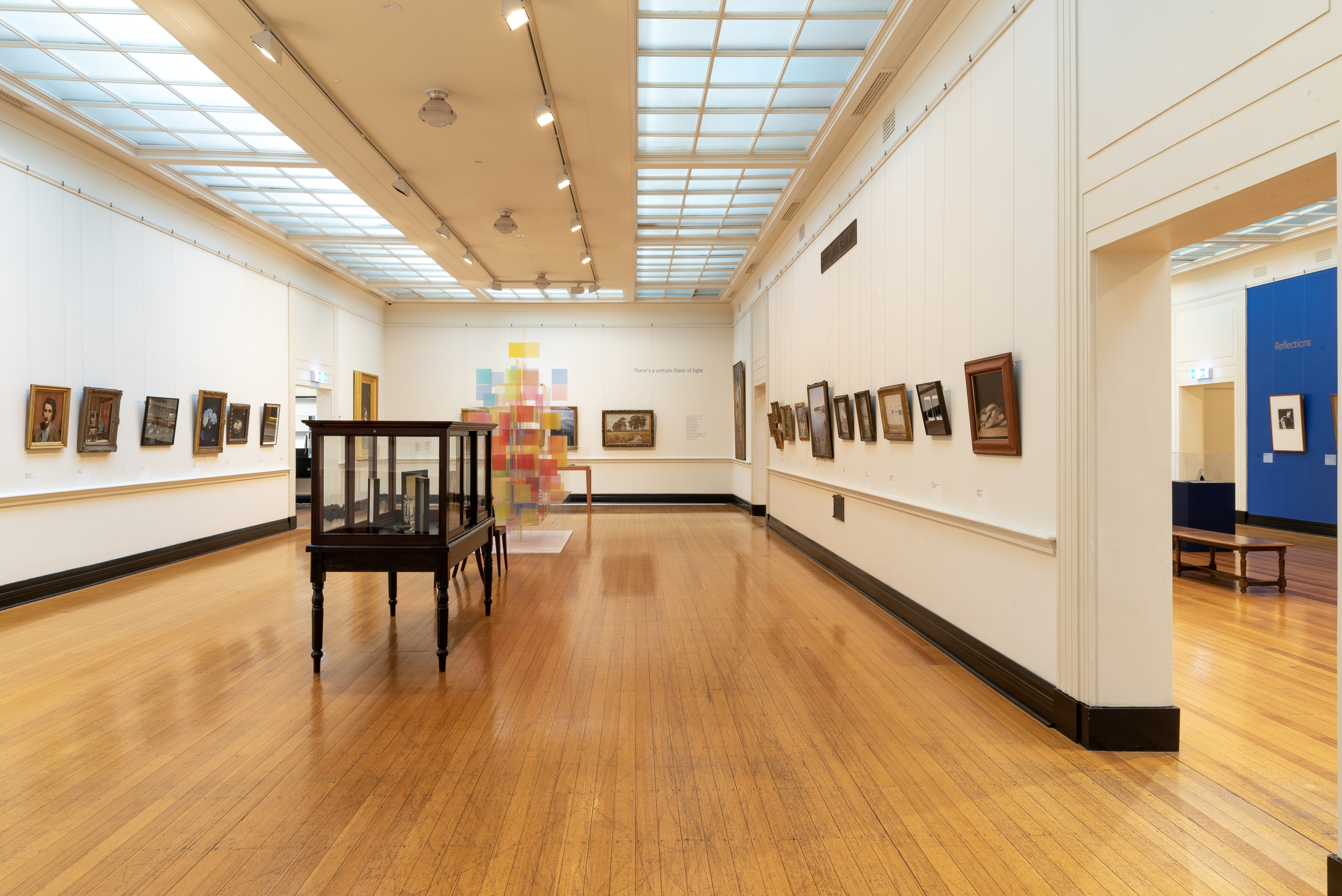
Castlemaine Art Museum interior

==== Castlemaine Art Museum (2019–2025) ====
Cass joined Castlemaine Art Museum as Director, Renewal, on 21 January, just before the 2019 Castlemaine State Festival, and there, with curator Jenny Long, focused on combining the previously separate art and museum collections in exhibits in both spaces and engaging with the local and First Nations communities. She developed a strategic plan, oversaw an audit and significance assessment of CAM’s collections, and upgraded the website with the inclusion of online access to newly digitised imagery of the collection. In partnership with local supporters and artists she attracted new audiences to the Museum through free public access, the Orbit exhibition series, exhibitions of local artists, and the Terrace Projections, which involved projecting commissioned works onto CAM’s heritage-listed facade nightly. The In Conversation series, included exhibitions with Janina Green (2019) and Melinda Harper (2021), in visual dialogue with CAM’s historical collections and contemporary artists. Cass departed Castlemaine Art Museum in June 2025.

== Publications ==
=== Books and chapters in books ===
- Renaissance references in Australian art, University Gallery, University of Melbourne, 1985
- Cass, Naomi (1987). What is this thing called science?University Gallery, The University of Melbourne 11 November–18 December 1987. University Gallery, University of Melbourne. ISBN 978-0-86839-969-0.
- Australian Centre for Contemporary Art (1991), Claiming : an installation of paintings by Stephen Bush, Melbourne, Victoria
- Cass, Naomi (1992). "Empty vessels make the most sound". Rosslynd Piggott. Powell Street Gallery.
- Cass, Naomi (1997). Material treasures: the textile collection of the Jewish Museum of Australia. Jewish Museum of Australia. ISBN 978-1-875670-12-3.
- Cass, Naomi; Victorian Music Teachers' Association (1998), Electric-eye, Victorian Music Teachers' Association
- King, Natalie, 1966-; Cass, Naomi; Jewish Museum of Australia (1998). Haimish (homely) : an exhibition of contemporary art. Jewish Museum of Australia. ISBN 978-1-875670-18-5.
- Loder, Nicola; Cass, Naomi (1998). Nicola Loder, landscape 1-18 : 17 Feb.- 7 Mar. 98, Gallery 101, Melbourne. Gallery 101.
- Cass, Naomi (2003). "Vizard's ark: A purposeful collection". See, Here Now: Vizard Foundation Art Collection of the 1990s (paperback ed.). Melbourne: Thames & Hudson. ISBN 9780500284483.
- Chew, Rebecca; Cass, Naomi; Centre for Contemporary Photography (2007), Echo : sounding out contemporary photography, Centre for Contemporary Photography
- Berkowitz, Lauren; Cass, Naomi (2007). Lauren Berkowitz: cornucopia : 8-24 November 2007. Sherman Galleries. Sherman Galleries.
- Temin, Kathy; Cass, Naomi; Ewington, Julie; Renton, Andrew, 1963-; Temin, Kathy, 1968-; Australian Centre for Contemporary Art (1995). Kathy Temin : three indoor monuments. Australian Centre for Contemporary Art. ISBN 978-0-947220-41-9.
- Gregory, Katherine Louise (2004). The Artist and the Museum: Contested Histories and Expanded Narratives in Australian Art and Museology 1975-2000 (Dissertation ed.). Melbourne, Vic.: University of Melbourne, School of Art History, Cinema, Classics and Archaeology. p. 56.
- Cass, Naomi (2005), Artnotes Victoria : Bronwyn Bancroft at the Koori Heritage Trust
- Zahalka, Anne; Palmer, Daniel; Rees, Karra; Rose, Julie; Cass, Naomi; Centre for Contemporary Photography (2007). Hall of mirrors: Anne Zahalka, portraits 1987-2007. Centre for Contemporary Photography. ISBN 978-0-9751371-5-4.
- Rosetzky, David; Cass, Naomi, (curator.); McFarlane, Kyla, (curator.); Centre for Contemporary Photography (Fitzroy, Vic.) (2013). True self : David Rosetzky : selected works. Centre for Contemporary Photography. ISBN 978-0-9872933-8-1.
- Cass, Naomi, (curator.); McFarlane, Kyla, (curator.); Centre for Contemporary Photography (2014). The Sievers project : Jane Brown, Cameron Clarke, Zoe Croggon, Therese Keogh, Phuong Ngo, Meredith Turnbull, Wolfgang Sievers. Centre for Contemporary Photography. ISBN 978-0-9875976-2-5.
- Cass, Naomi; Consandine, Cate; Garrett, Stephen; Brook, Brook; Morgan, Luke (2016). "Introduction". The wandering eye. Centre for Contemporary Photography. ISBN 978-0-9946229-0-7.
- Milne, Pippa; Cass, Naomi, (writer of foreword.); Johson, Joseph, (book designer.); Centre for Contemporary Photography, (issuing body.) (2016). CCP declares : on the social contract. Centre for Contemporary Photography. ISBN 978-0-9875976-9-4.
- Cass, Naomi, (curator.); Centre for Contemporary Photography, (issuing body.) (2016). The documentary take : Centre for Contemporary Photography, Melbourne Festival, 1 October - 13 November 2016 : Destiny Deacon and Virginia Fraser, Simryn Gill, Ponch Hawkes, Sonia Leber and David Chesworth, Louis Porter, Patrick Pound, Charlie Sofo and David Wadelton. Centre for Contemporary Photography. ISBN 978-0-9946229-1-4.
- Cass, Naomi, (curator.); Milne, Pippa, (curator.); Centre for Contemporary Photography, (issuing body.) (2017). An unorthodox flow of images,Centre forContemporary Photography Melbourne Festival 2017. Centre for Contemporary Photography. ISBN 978-0-9946229-3-8.

=== Journal articles ===
- Cass, Naomi (1995). "Kathy Temin. Three indoor monuments". Art + Text (50).
- Cass, Naomi (1997). "The Millionth Migrant: A Non-Issue at Melbourne's Post Master Gallery". Art and Australia. 36 (1): 52–3 – via art+australia.
- Cass, Naomi (January 1999). "Parallax error". Artlink. 19 (1): 52–55. ISSN 0727-1239.
- Cass, Naomi (1999). "Exhibitions. Suspended breath. Refining dreams and sensibilities". Art and Australia. 36 (3): 336.
- Cass, Naomi (2000). "Making a Museum of Oneself: The Grainger Museum". Meanjin. 59 (2): 140–151. ISSN 0025-6293.
- Cass, Naomi (January 2003). "Cast from the heart". Craft Arts International (58): 74–76. ISSN 1038-846X.
