= Centre for Contemporary Photography =

Coordinates: 37°47′50″S 144°58′57″E

Centre for Contemporary Photography (CCP)
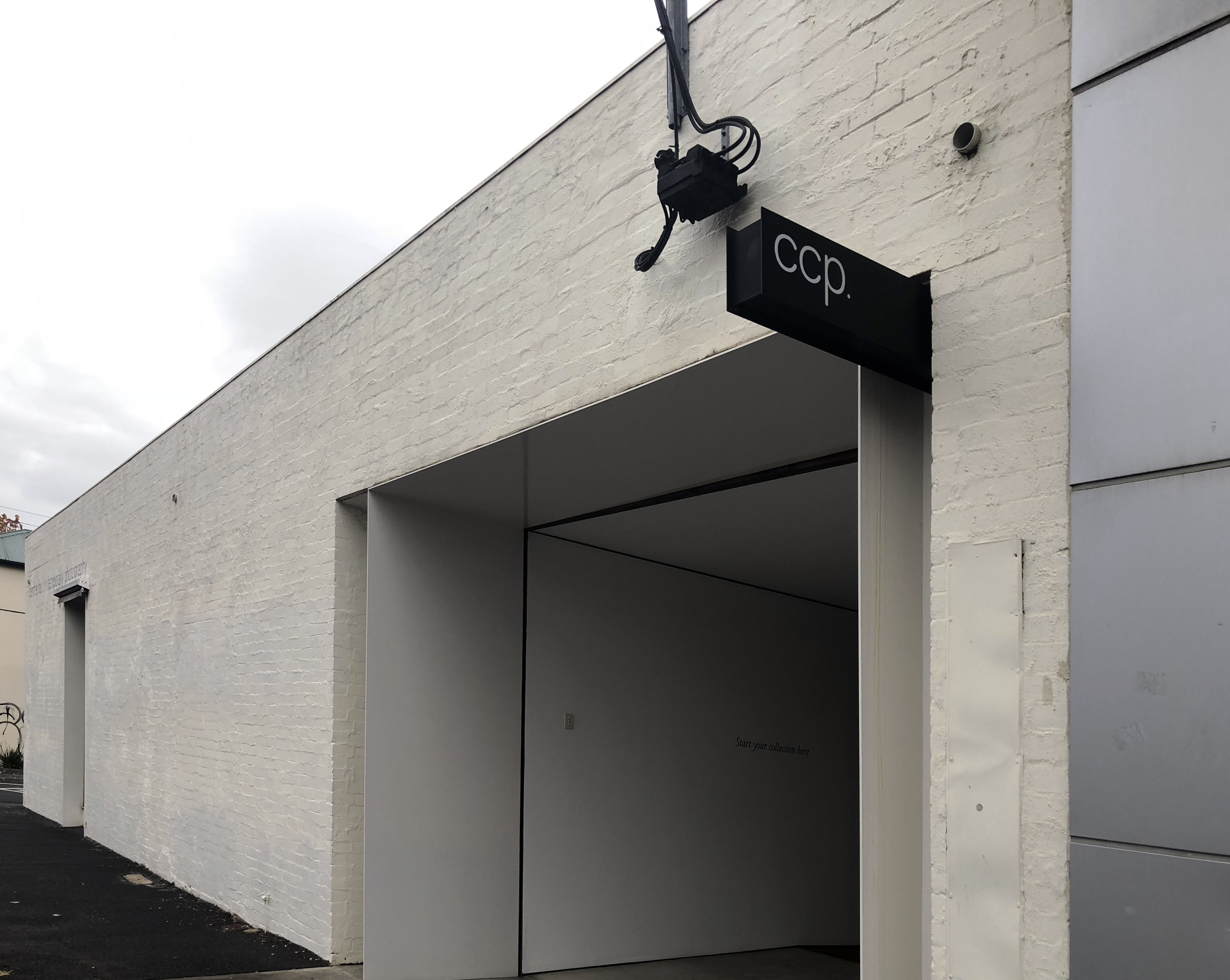
- Former name: Victorian Centre for Photography
- Established: 1986
- Location: 404 George Street, Fitzroy, Victoria, Australia
- Website: ccp.org.au

The Centre for Contemporary Photography (CCP), in Fitzroy, Melbourne, Victoria, is a venue for the exhibition of contemporary photo-based arts, providing a context for the enjoyment, education, understanding and appraisal of contemporary practice.

== History ==
Established in 1986 as the Victorian Centre for Photography (VCP) by representatives of the photographic community on advice of Bernie O’Regan (1938–1996) who completed a study of its feasibility in the previous year, the VCP's first space was a shopfront on Rathdowne Street in Carlton, an inner suburb of Melbourne. It was supported by funding from the Victorian Ministry for the Arts and from the Australia Council for the Arts and issued an irregular newsletter to members. The organisation developed from a small community operation for local photographers and developed to encompass photographers Australia-wide and international in its program of exhibitions and publications. A major contribution was the survey exhibition and publication The Thousand Mile Stare which toured the nation 1988 to 1989 which has become a reference point in the late twentieth history of Australian photography.

VCP moved to larger quarters at 205 Johnston Street, Fitzroy and shortly after changed its name to Centre for Contemporary Photography in the early 1990s to reflect its contemporary orientation. In 2005, CCP relocated to 404 George Street, Fitzroy, in purpose-designed premises by Sean Godsell Architects.

As a not-for-profit exhibition and resource centre, CCP has played a role in the support of photo-based arts across its spectrum and public engagement with photography. Major artists who have exhibited at CCP include Leah King-Smith, Gregory Crewdson, Robert Rooney, Kohei Yoshiyuki, Taryn Simon, Jane Burton, John Stezaker and Patricia Piccinini. As well as extensively showcasing contemporary fine art, its exhibitions are inclusive of indigenous photography, traditional genres such as portraiture, documentary and photojournalism in particular through its Leica/CCP Documentary Photography Award, pioneering digital imaging and video

The organisation celebrated its 30th year in July 2016 with an exhibition From Silver Gelatin to Instagram: Celebrating 30 Years of the CCP of work donated from prominent Australian photographers to raise funds after it became one of 62 arts institutions to lose federal funding, prior to which it received forty percent of its total income from the State of Victoria through Creative Victoria and the Commonwealth Government through the Australia Council and further support through the Visual Arts and Crafts Strategy, an initiative of the Australian and State and Territory Governments, with the remainder self-generated through membership and initiatives including an annual fundraiser exhibition of a work or suite of images donated by significant Australian artists.

The CCP was funded by a Creative Victoria multi-year grant terminating in 2022, and one from Creative Australia that ceased in 2024. Loss of this state and federal funding forced a relocation from George Street to a small ‘Project Space’ in the Collingwood Yards arts precinct, after which the gallery has remained closed in 2025, with the launch of a new exhibition in collaboration with RMIT Gallery announced for June 2025.

== Management ==
=== Directors ===
- Deborah Ely (1988-1991)
- Susan Fereday (1992-1995)
- Stuart Koop (1995-1999)
- Tessa Dwyer
- Charlotte Day (1999–2001).
- Naomi Cass (2001–June 2018)
- Adam Harding (from August 2018 – 2022)
- Daniel Boetker-Smith 2022–present.

Volunteers who have since moved into or contributed significantly to the field include the art historian Professor Daniel Palmer, now Associate Dean, Research and Innovation the School of Art, RMIT University; Michelle Mountain now Exhibition Manager and Curator at TarraWarra Museum of Art; and Pippa Milne, now Senior Curator at Monash Gallery of Art.

=== Board of Management ===
The CCP is overseen by a Board of Management, currently Patrick Pound (Chair), Michael McCormack (Dep. Chair), Nicole Bradshaw (Treasurer), Myles Russell-Cook, Isobel Crombie, Ying Ang, Neil Hugh Kenna, Hoda Afshar, Mark Simpson.

== Exhibitions ==
CCP's exhibition program is presented across five exhibition spaces, including the Night Projection Window, viewed from 9 pm to 2 am, and includes a diverse range of photo-based arts from emerging to established artists. The program includes individual, group and curated exhibitions representing local, interstate and international photography, from emerging and established artists, as well as curators and writers. Its CCP Salon, with sponsors including Leica and Ilford, is an open-entry competition for more than $20,000 worth of prizes over 23 categories, and visitors are invited to vote. Admission to CCP is free. In 2017 there were 92,898 visitors to the Fitzroy venue.

== Education ==
CCP presents Artist Floor Talks by exhibiting artists each Saturday following exhibition openings. CCP also presents education programs including practical photography courses, and annual series of public lectures; past speakers have included Geoffrey Batchen, Martin Parr and Victor Burgin.

== Publications ==
In April 2009, CCP began publishing Flash, a quarterly online journal. Flash includes reviews, interviews and commentary on photography and video in Australia by a diverse group of established and emerging writers. Edited from 2010 to 2015 by Kyla McFarlane, Flash is a free journal.

The centre has published the following catalogues and books:

- Koop, Stuart & CCP (Fitzroy, Vic.) (1992). Shot. CCP, Fitzroy
- CCP (1993). Immortality : a re-examination of the hero : 7 April to 9 May 1993, CCP Melbourne. The Centre, Melbourne
- CCP (1993). Please allow me to introduce myself... : 15 May -13 June 1993, an exhibition of video installations. CCP, Fitzroy, [Vic.]
- Tyndall, Peter & Stokes, Christine & Courier (Ballarat, Vic.) & CCP (1993). Photos from the Courier, collected by Peter Tyndall : CCP, Fitzroy 3065, 18 June - 18 July 1993.
- Fereday, Susan, 1959- & CCP & NETS Victoria (1993). Arranging nature : Elizabeth Butler, Gillian Dallwitz, Naomi Kumar, Donna Larcom, Tony Nott, James Packer, June Savage. CCP, Fitzroy, Vic.
- Drummond, Rozalind, 1956-; Koop, Stuart; Centre for Contemporary Photography (1993), Reflex, Centre for Contemporary Photography, ISBN 978-0-646-16319-2
- Stoney, Elisabeth & Green, Janina (1993). Home hygiene : filth and transfiguration. Mac Advice, Melbourne, Vic.
- Baraki, Bashir, 1943- & CCP (1994). Evolution + change : 8 April-7 May 1994, Centre for Contemporary Photography : Christine Adams, Warren Breninger, Vince Dziekan, Ewa Narkiewicz, Robert Randall, Alex Syndikas. The Centre, Fitzroy, Vic
- Koop, Stuart & Fereday, Susan, 1959- & CCP (1994). IPSO photo : Chris Fortescue, Margaret Roberts, Marie Sierra-Hughes, Philip Watkins, CCP, 30 September – 29 October 1994. CCP, Melbourne.
- Institute of Modern Art (Brisbane, Qld.) & CCP (1994). Heritage, history, memory and the temptation of myth. CCP, [Fitzroy, Vic.]
- McLeish, Rod & Moore, Ross, 1954-. Walking the labyrinth (1994). Naked and unashamed. CCP, [Fitzroy, Vic.]
- Jones, Brett & Stubbs, Sarah (1995). Infotainment : scenes from others' lives. CCP [Fitzroy, Vic.]
- Higginbotham, Julie; Richardson, Leonie (1995). Stenopaeics (Exhibition catalogue ed.). Fitzroy, Vic.: Centre for Contemporary Photography. ISBN 9780646243566.
- Koop, Stuart & Victoria. Arts Victoria & CCP (Fitzroy, Vic.) (1995). Post : photography post photography. CCP, CCP, Fitzroy [Vic.]
- Riva, Jacqueline & CCP (1995). Familiar : 6 October-4 November 1995. A Constructed World Inc. in association with the CCP, [Melbourne, Vic.]
- Victorian College of the Arts. School of Art (host institution.) & CCP (Fitzroy, Vic.) (host institution.) (1995). MCMXCV graduate photography exhibition. [Southbank, Vic.] Victorian College of the Arts
- Fereday, Susan & Waverley City Gallery (Vic.) & CCP (1995). Likeness : 46 photographs from the Waverley City Gallery, Monash City Council collection. CCP, Melbourne, Vic.
- (1996). Sitters. Helen Schutt Access Gallery, CCP, [Melbourne]
- Pennings, Mark W & Seward, Andrew & Holt, Richard, 1961- & CCP (1996). After image : painting photography. CCP, Fitzroy, Vic
- Koop, Stuart & CCP (1996). Rumble. CCP, Fitzroy, Vic.
- Morse, Peter & CCP (1996). Default : Marion Harper, May 10 - June 8, 1996. CCP, [Fitzroy, Vic]
- Papapetrou, Polixeni & CCP (1996). Curated bodies. CCP, [Melbourne ]
- (1996). XLR8 : summersalon : 1996 2–24 February. CCP, Fitzroy, Vic.
- Bok, Marco & CCP & Documentary Photography Exhibition and Award (1st : 1997) (1997). Leica CCP Documentary Photography Exhibition and Award. CCP, Fitzroy, Vic.
- Koop, Stuart & CCP (1997). A small history of photography. CCP, Melbourne, Vic.
- Duncan, Colin & CCP (1997). Interiors : an exhibition. CCP, Fitzroy, Vic.
- Foley, Fiona & Lowe, Geoff, 1952- & Whanki Museum (Seoul, Korea) & Asialink (Firm) & CCP (Fitzroy, Vic.) (1997). Sense : Australia-Korea cultural exchange : an Asialink project. Asialink Center; Seoul : Whanki Museum; Fitzroy, Vic. : Center for Contemporary Photography, Carlton, Vic.
- Raxworthy, Julian & CCP (1997). Inactivity. CCP, Fitzroy, Vic.
- Ludeman, Brenda & Lewens, Carolyn & CCP (1997). Countenance : Carolyn Lewens. CCP, Fitzroy, Vic
- Johnston, Kylie & Tomlinson, Nicole & CCP (1997). Closure. CCP, Fitzroy, Vic.
- Antonsson, Lotta & Sander, Katya (1997). (Alikeness) : starring Lotta Antonsson.... CCP, Fitzroy, Vic.
- Deftereos, Greg & McQuire, Scott & CCP (1998). Mnemosyne, or do humans dream in negative strips?. CCP, Fitzroy, Vic.
- CCP (Fitzroy, Vic.) (1998). Sub zero : Summer salon '98 : 6–28 February. CCP, Fitzroy, Vic.
- Anderson, Charles & Carter, Paul, 1951- & CCP & Anna Schwartz Gallery (1998). Dis/appearance Waiting Room #4 : Nulbildung. [Charles Anderson & Paul Carter], [Melbourne]
- Verdon, James & CCP (1999). Self remembering - optimal viewing distance. CCP, Fitzroy, Vic.
- French, Blair & French, Blair, 1967- & Canberra Contemporary Art Space & CCP (Fitzroy, Vic.) (2000). Perfect strangers : Dean Beaubois, Deej Fabyc, Alex Kershaw, Sandy Nicholson, Deborah Ostrow, Elvis Richardson, Silvia Vélez, Justene Williams. CCP, [Fitzroy, Vic]
- Rosetzky, David & CCP (Fitzroy, Vic.) (2000). Custom made. CCP, [Fitzroy, Vic]
- Grocott, Lisa & CCP (Fitzroy, Vic.) (2000). Lisa Grocott. CCP, [Fitzroy, Vic.]
- CCP (2000). Mathieu Gallois : flight 934-B. Melbourne, Victoria, CCP.
- CCP (Fitzroy, Vic.) (2001). Internationally unknown artists, 2–18 November 2000. CCP, Fitzroy, Vic.
- CCP (Fitzroy, Vic.) (2001). Click. CCP, Fitzroy, Vic.
- Day, Charlotte, (curator.) & Stanhope, Zara, (curator.) & CCP & Adam Art Gallery (2001). Happiness : Parallel words. Adam Art Gallery; Fitzroy : CCP, Wellington, New Zealand.
- Koop, Stuart & CCP (Fitzroy, Vic.) (2002). Value added goods : essays on contemporary photography, art & ideas. CCP, Melbourne, Vic.
- CCP (Fitzroy, Vic.) (2002). X 02 H21/2. CCP, Fitzroy, Vic.
- CCP (Fitzroy, Vic.) (2002). Gloss : an exhibition & magazine project. CCP, [Fitzroy, Vic.]
- Palmer, Daniel (2002). Insert meaning here. Fitzroy CCP.
- Martin, Meredith & Macarow, Keely & CCP (Fitzroy, Vic.) (2003). Elastic : national digital media exhibition 2003-2004. CCP, [Fitzroy, Vic.]
- Lee, Brendan, 1963- & Bullock, Natasha & CCP (Fitzroy, Vic.) (2003). Art + film. CCP, Fitzroy, Vic.
- Bolis, Jenny & Gordon, Alis & CCP (Fitzroy, Vic.) (2003). Buildings are lonely people [catalogue]. CCP, Fitzroy, Vic.
- Loder, Nicola & CCP (Fitzroy, Vic.) (2003). Wild thing. CCP, [Fitzroy, Vic.]
- Bailey, Donna & CCP (Fitzroy, Vic.) (2003). Just a girl : Donna Bailey. CCP, Fitzroy, Vic.
- Blakely, Angela & CCP (Fitzroy, Vic.) (2003). Keep passing the open windows : a photodocumentary on suicide + grief. CCP, [Fitzroy, Vic.]
- CCP Public Image : 2004 Lecture Series.
- Knight, Paul & Bullock, Natasha & CCP (Fitzroy, Vic.) (2004). Paul Knight : photographs. CCP, Fitzroy, Vic.
- Purdy, Susan & Latrobe Regional Gallery. (host institution.) & CCP (host institution.) (2004). Susan Purdy : new branches on an old tree. [Fitzroy, Victoria CCP.
- Clarke, Maree & Evans, Megan & CCP (Fitzroy, Vic.) (2005). Black on white : an exhibition of photographs by Aboriginal artists representing non-aboriginalty. CCP, Fitzroy, Vic.
- Curtis, Andrew & Neville, Greg & Criterion Gallery & Christine Abrahams Gallery & CCP (Fitzroy, Vic.) (2005). Underpin. A. Curtis, [Victoria]
- Sleeth, Matthew & Palmer, Daniel & CCP (Fitzroy, Vic.) (2005). The great leap forward : Matthew Sleeth and Selina Ou. CCP, [Fitzroy, Vic.]
- Walker, Lyndal & Strahan, Lucinda & CCP & PICA (2005). Stay young : Lyndal Walker. PICApress, Perth, W.A.
- CCP (Fitzroy, Vic.) (2006). CCP : 8 September - 21 October 2006 : Beverley Veasey, Family resemblance, Rapt! 20 contemporary artists from Japan. CCP, Fitzroy, Vic.
- Gill, Simryn & Palmer, Daniel & Carter, Jenni & CCP (Fitzroy, Vic.) (2006). Simryn Gill : 32 volumes. CCP, Fitzroy, Vic.
- Hipkins, Gavin & CCP (Fitzroy, Vic.) (2006). Gavin Hipkins : the village. CCP, Fitzroy, Vic.
- Henderson, Derek & CCP (2006). 20 years. CCP, Fitzroy, Vic.
- CCP (Fitzroy, Vic.) (2006). In cold light. CCP, Fitzroy, Vic.
- Chew, Rebecca & CCP (Fitzroy, Vic.) (2006). Family resemblance : Tim Gresham, Renee So, Michelle Ussher. CCP, Fitzroy, Vic.
- Chew, Rebecca & Cass, Naomi & CCP (Fitzroy, Vic.) (2007). Echo : sounding out contemporary photography. CCP, Fitzroy, Vic.
- Wise, Kit & Evans, Rhiannon & Byrne, Lisa & CCP (Fitzroy, Vic.) (2007). Kit Wise : rhapsodia. CCP, Fitzroy, Vic.
- Thomas, David (2007). Composite realities amid time and space : recent art and photography. CCP, Fitzroy, Vic.
- Zahalka, Anne & Rees, Karra & Palmer, Daniel & Rose, Julie & CCP (Fitzroy, Vic.) (2007). Hall of mirrors : Anne Zahalka, portraits 1987-2007. CCP, [Fitzroy, Vic.]
- Rees, Karra & CCP (Fitzroy, Vic.) (2008). CCP : one of us cannot be wrong. CCP, Fitzroy, Vic.
- Corridore, Michael & CCP (Fitzroy, Vic.) (2008). Michael Corridore : angry black snake, 2004-2007. CCP, Fitzroy, Vic.
- Silver, Tim & Keehan, Reuben & CCP (Fitzroy, Vic.) (2008). Tim Silver : the Tuvaluan Project. CCP, Fitzroy, Vic.
- Noble, Anne & Cass, Naomi & McFarlane, Kyla & CCP (Fitzroy, Vic.) (2008). Ice blink : Antarctic photographs : Anne Noble. CCP, Fitzroy, Vic.
- O'Brien, Conor & CCP (Fitzroy, Vic.) (2008). Hold on to Each Other (1st ed). Serps Press, North Fitzroy
- Jeffs, Peter & CCP (Fitzroy, Vic.) (2008). Peter Jeffs : time and distance. CCP, Fitzroy, Vic.
- O'Brien, Conor & Black&Blue Gallery & CCP (Fitzroy, Vic.) (2008). There stands the glass. Serps Press, [Melbourne]
- CCP (Fitzroy, Vic.) (2009). Tracey Moffat, Clare Rae/Colour Factory Award, CCP Documentary Photography Award, Anne Ferran, Laith McGregor, Emil Toonen. CCP, Fitzroy, Vic.
- Nichols, Mac & Nichols, Jonathan & CCP (2009). Mac : 030409 - 230509. CCP, Fitzroy, Victoria.
- Gill, Simryn & Cass, Naomi & CCP (Fitzroy, Vic.) (2009). Simryn Gill : inland. CCP, Fitzroy, Vic.
- CCP (Fitzroy, Vic.) (2009). Peter Fitzpatrick, Sanja Pahoki, On the Line, Boris Eldagsen, Alan Constable : 23 January-21 March 2009. CCP, Fitzroy, Vic.
- Tai, Hanna & Finch, Maggie & CCP (Fitzroy, Vic.) (2009). Hanna Tai : trees in space : the reorder of things. CCP, Fitzroy, Vic.
- CCP (2009). Bianca Hester, Louis Porter, Arlo Mountford, Simon Zoric, Catherine Connolly, Larissa Hjorth. CCP, Fitzroy, Vic.
- Button, Jane (2009). Forms in flux : the shifting sites of photographic practice.
- Hjorth, Larissa & Victorian Centre for Photography (2009). CU : the presents of co-presence. CCP, Fitzroy, Victoria.
- CCP (Fitzroy, Vic.) & Feary, Mark (2010). Autumn masterpieces : highlights from the permanent collection 19 March to 16 May 2010. CCP, Fitzroy, Vic.
- Mould, Jeremy & CCP (Fitzroy, Vic.) (2010). Event Horizon : exhibition held at Centre for Contemporary Photography, Fitzroy, Victoria, 21 May - 18 July 2010. CCP, Fitzroy.
- Fox, Robin & Plagne, Francis & CCP (Fitzroy, Vic.) (2010). Robin Fox : proof of concept. CCP, Fitzroy, Vic.
- McFarlane, Kyla & Consandine, Cate, 1970- & Knight, Paul, 1976- & Maynard, Ricky, 1953- & Nicholson, Tom, 1973- et al. (2011). Without words. CCP, Fitzroy, Vic.
- Beehre, Mark & Whitman, Walt, (author.,) & CCP (Fitzroy, Vic.) (2011). Men undressed. [Fitzroy, Vic] CCP.
- Cass, Naomi & CCP (Fitzroy, Vic.) (2011). In camera and in public : Denis Beaubois, Luc Delahaye, Cherine Fahd, Percy Grainger, Bill Henson, Sonia Leber & David Chesworth, Walid Raad, Kohei Yoshiyuki, ASIO surveillance photographs. CCP, Fitzroy, Vic.
- Pettifer, Drew & Finch, Maggie, (author.) & CCP (Fitzroy, Vic.) (2011). Hand in glove. Fitzroy, Vic. CCP
- Davison, Mark & Gattineau, Tobias & Monash University & CCP & Photography as Crime Symposium (2011 : Melbourne, Vic.) (2011). Taking photographs 'in public' : what's lawful and what's not?. Monash University, [Clayton, Vic.]
- Mangan, Nicholas & Taylor, Warren, (artist.) & CCP (host institution) & 3-Ply (2012). Some kinds of duration. Melbourne 3-Ply
- Hutchison, Eliza & Clemens, Justin, (author.) (2012). Hair in the gate, a biograph. Fitzroy, VIC. CCP.
- McFarlane, Kyla, (curator.) & Brown, Jane, (photographer.) & Coulter, Ross, (photographer.) & Erkan, Yavuz, 1982-, (photographer.) & Hazewinkel, Andrew, (photographer.) et al. (2013). CCP Declares : on the nature of things. CCP, Fitzroy, VIC.
- Papapetrou, Polixeni & CCP (2013). A performative paradox. Fitzroy, Vic CCP
- Rooney, Robert, 1937–2017, (artist.) & Pound, Patrick, (author.) & Finch, Maggie, (author.) & CCP (host institution) & Tolarno Galleries (sponsoring body) (2013). Robert Rooney : the box brownie years 1956-58. CCP, Fitzroy, VIC.
- Rosetzky, David & Cass, Naomi, (curator.) & McFarlane, Kyla, (curator.) & CCP (Fitzroy, Vic.) (2013). True self : David Rosetzky : selected works. CCP, Fitzroy, Victoria
- Burns, Karen & Scicluna, Jo, (artist,) (Artist) & Smith, Vivian Cooper, (designer.) & CCP (issuing body) & Yarra (Shire, Vic.) (sponsoring body) (2013). Jo Scicluna: when our horizons meet. Fitzroy, VIC CCP.
- Cass, Naomi, (curator.) & McFarlane, Kyla, (curator.) & CCP (2014). The Sievers project : Jane Brown, Cameron Clarke, Zoe Croggon, Therese Keogh, Phuong Ngo, Meredith Turnbull, Wolfgang Sievers. CCP, Fitzroy, Victoria
- Bryant, Jan (Jan P.), (curator.) & Guiton, Jean-François, 1953-, (artist.) & Green, Tamsin, (artist.) & Monteith, Alex, 1977-, (artist.) & Pfeifer, Mario, (artist.) et al. (2014). A taste of ashes fills the air : Jean-François Guiton, Tamsin Green, Alex Monteith, Mario Pfeifer. Fitzroy, Victoria, Australia CCP.
- Wall, Sarah, (curator.) & Lantieri, Laura, (curator.) & CCP (issuing body.) (2015). Lit from the top : sculpture through photography : Paul Adair, Fleur van Dodewaard, Andrew Hazewinkel, Georgia Hutchison & Arini Byng, Stéphanie Lagarde, Stein Rønning. Fitzroy, VIC, Australia CCP
- Hjorth, Larissa & CCP (issuing body.) (2015). The art of play. Fitzroy, Vic CCP
- Corompt, Martine, (artist.) & Brophy, Philip, (artist.) & Rees, Karra, (curator.) & CCP (Fitzroy, Vic.) (host institution.) (2015). Torrent. Fitzroy, Vic. CCP.
- Cass, Naomi, (curator.) & CCP (issuing body.) (2016). The documentary take : Centre for Contemporary Photography, Melbourne Festival, 1 October - 13 November 2016 : Destiny Deacon and Virginia Fraser, Simryn Gill, Ponch Hawkes, Sonia Leber and David Chesworth, Louis Porter, Patrick Pound, Charlie Sofo and David Wadelton. Fitzroy, [Victoria] CCP.
- Milne, Pippa & Cass, Naomi, (writer of foreword.) & Johnson, Joseph, (book designer.) & CCP (issuing body.) (2016). CCP declares : on the social contract. [Fitzroy, Victoria] CCP.
- Andrew, Brook & Consandine, Cate, 1970-, (artist.) & Garrett, Stephen, 1968-, (artist.) & Morgan, Luke, (author.) & Cass, Naomi, (writer of introduction.) et al. (2016). The wandering eye I. Fitzroy [Victoria] CCP.
- McCulloch, Samantha, (curator.) & Wilkinson, Frances, (curator.) & CCP (2016). Shadow sites : Léuli Eshraghi, Catherine Evans, Grace Herbert, Sophie Neate, James Tylor, Rudi Williams, Elmedin Žunić. Melbourne CCP
- Brown, Jane E & Haslem, Wendy, (writer of catalogue essay.) & CCP (issuing body.) (2016). Black ships. Fitzroy, VIC CCP.
- Wadelton, David & CCP (issuing body.) (2016). The Northcote Hysterical Society. Fitzroy, VIC CCP
- Cass, Naomi, (curator.) & Milne, Pippa, (curator.) & CCP (issuing body.) (2017). An unorthodox flow of images CCP Melbourne Festival 2017. Fitzroy, [Victoria] CCP.
- Noble, Anne & CCP (2017). No vertical song. [Fitzroy, Melbourne] CCP.
- Rae, Clare & Bright, Susan, 1969-, (writer of foreword.) & Syvret, Gareth, (writer of added commentary.) & Rule, Dan, (editor.) & Brewer, Narelle, (book designer.) (2018). Never standing on two feet. Perimeter Editions, Melbourne, Australia.

== See also ==
- Australian Centre for Photography
- Queensland Centre for Photography
- Brummels Gallery
- The Photographers' Gallery and Workshop
- Church Street Centre for Photography
