= Joanna Zylinska =

British media academic

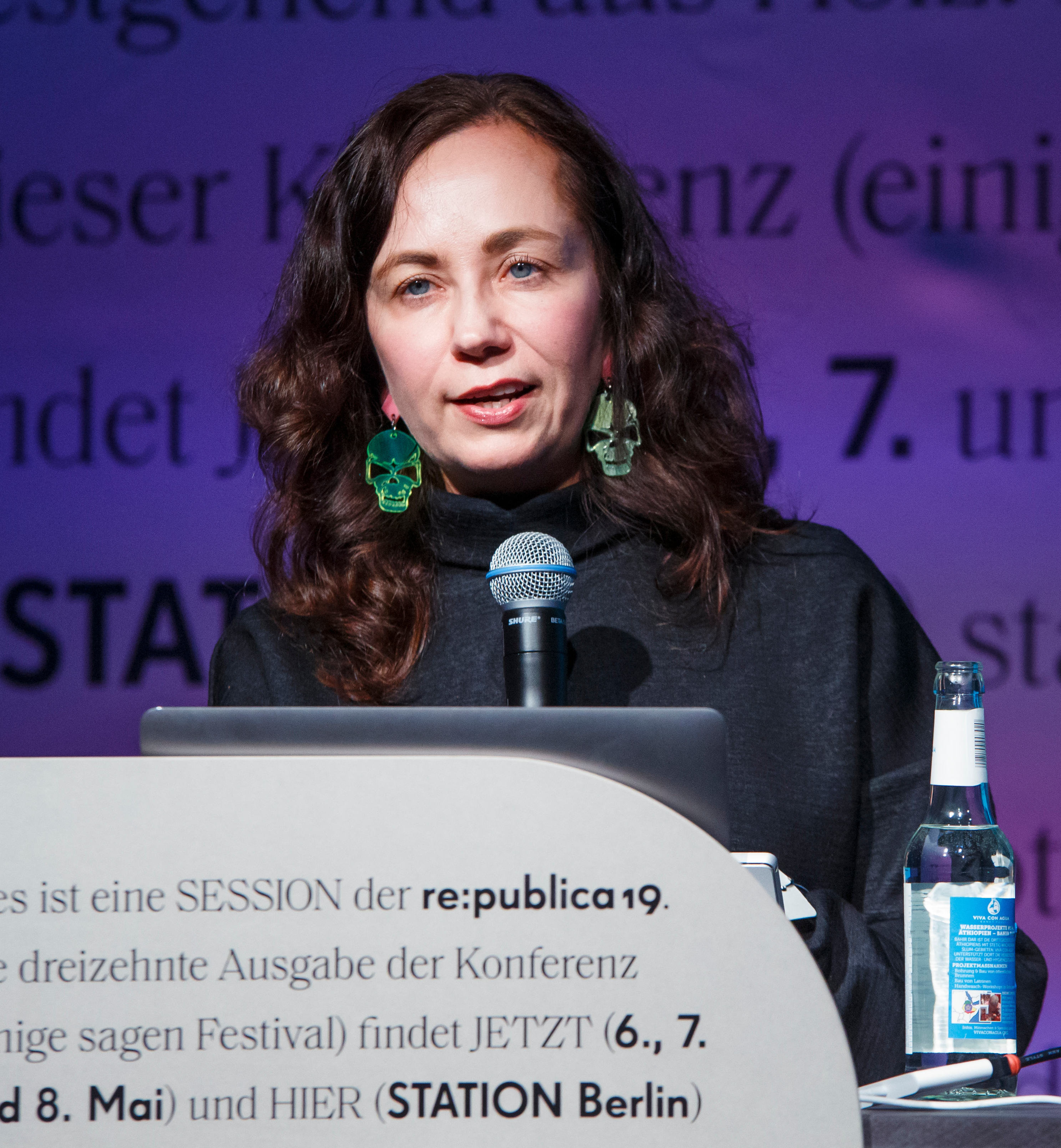
- Joanna Zylinska (2019)
- Born: Joanna Żylińska; 5 May 1971 (age 54)
- Occupations: Academic, writer and artist
- Employer: King's College London
- Website: joannazylinska.net

Joanna Zylinska (born Joanna Żylińska, 5 May 1971) is a British writer, researcher and artist. She is Professor of Media Philosophy + Critical Digital Practice at King's College London. Prior to Joining King's in September 2021 she was Professor of New Media and Communications, and in 2017–2020, Co-Head of the Department of Media, Communications and Cultural Studies, at Goldsmiths, University of London. In 2017 she proposed a “feminist counter-apocalypse” as an alternative to the dangers of the "Exit of Man", Artificial Intelligence and Populism.

== Life ==
Zylinska was born in 1971. She was brought up in Poland and moved to the UK during her graduate studies. She received her Ph.D. from the University of Wrocław. She was a lecturer there. She is interested in new media and art and particularly the effects of emerging technology.

Zylinska's work engages with stories of our human collapse as a civilization and as a species. This involves raising questions about our modes of knowledge and the paternalistic articulations related to such stories them that come from some contemporary prophets of doom and gloom. Zylinska draws comparisons between the technological constitution of humanity and the machine, and the work of artists such as Stelarc who uses his own body to experiment with technology.

In 2013 Zylinska took on the role of curator when she oversaw, as Artistic Director, the largest Latin American new media festival, Transitio_MX05 Biomediations, which was held in Mexico City. With Gary Hall, Clare Birchall and the Open Humanities Press, Żylińska helped create the Jisc-funded project starting in 2014 LivBL: Living Books about Life, a sustainable series of electronic open access books about life – with life understood both philosophically and biologically – providing a bridge between the humanities and the sciences. The books are open and can be updated online.

Her 2017 book "Nonhuman Photography" deals with the subject of what she calls non-human imaging. She argues that we need to redefine image making to make it less human-centric. Art should include not only recent automated astronomy pictures, computational photography, Google Earth but also older created images such as fossils. She experiments herself with images and she is intrigued by the tragicomical idea of the "end of man".

In 2018 she published "The End of Man: A Feminist Counterapocalypse". It was a book and film project which proposed a “feminist counter-apocalypse” as an alternative to the dangers of the "Exit Man", Artificial Intelligence and Populism. Her latest book is AI Art: Machine Visions and Warped Dreams. The book includes a project from Zylinska’s art practice which explores human and nonhuman forms of intelligence, perception and action.

== Journal articles ==
Zylinska publishes in journals Science, photographies, Debate Feminista, Photography and Culture, Media Theory, Teksty Drugie, Membrana Journal of Photography, among others.

== Book publications ==
- The Cyborg Experiments: the extensions of the body in the media age (2002)
- Minimal Ethics for the Anthropocene (2014)
- Nonhuman Photography (2017)
- The End of Man: A Feminist Counterapocalypse (2018)

== Translation ==
- Lem, Stanisław (2013). Summa Technologiae. Minneapolis: University of Minnesota Press. ISBN 978-0816675760., first complete English translation
