= Susan Fereday =

Australian photographer (born 1959)

- Born: 1959 (age 66–67); Adelaide, South Australia
- Education: Monash University
- Known for: Photography

Susan Fereday (born 1959) is an Australian artist, writer, curator and educator. She holds a doctorate from Monash University, Melbourne. She was born in Adelaide, South Australia.

== Biography ==
Fereday studied to be a photographic technician in Adelaide. She attended Prahran College in Melbourne to study photographic art, obtaining her Bachelor of Arts in 1986 and her Master of Arts (Fine Art) in 1992. She performed research Paris in 1996–1997 on a scholarship from Samstag. She received her doctorate from Monash University in 2010.

Fereday has been a lecturer in art theory and studio practice at the Victorian College of the Arts (1990–93), Royal Melbourne Institute of Technology (1998-2000), and Monash University (2005–08).

== Artist ==
Since the 1980s Fereday has exhibited artworks in various media, including objets trouvés, installation art, photography, and video. She has collected and displayed found photographs taken by anonymous amateurs in the 1950s. Penny Webb places her "Ilsley Green Road" series by an unknown photographer at Sutton Gallery in "country lanes in England in the 1950s," while her series Under a Steel Sky, at West Space in 2008 used similar material, as critic, Robert Nelson notes; "From unrelated sources in the United States [. . .] Fereday has collected pictures of people in cars, on the road, in the countryside." Both commentators understand that the sequencing is intended to create a narrative, as Nelson reports;

They are printed to a large scale, which the original photographers would never have contemplated; but the resolution is consistent. Not knowing the sources, you impute a single narrative to the pictures."

Fereday's doctoral thesis, Light Out of Darkness: the origin of photography in mystery and melancholy, was a study of the work of pioneer photographers Nicéphore Niépce and William Henry Fox Talbot.

== Curator ==
Fereday was the Director of the Centre for Contemporary Photography, Melbourne during the period 1992 to 1995.

Exhibitions she has curated include:

- 1996: Ruins in Reverse exhibiting artists Lauren Berkowitz, Adam Boyd, Colin Duncan, Hewson-Walker, Shaun Kirby, Chris Langton, Callum Morton, Rose Nolan, Deborah Ostrow, Kathy Temin, Chris Ulbrick, Chris White, Constanze Zikos, at RMIT Gallery
- 1995: Like-ness: 46 photographs from Waverley City Collection, Centre for Contemporary Photography
- 1994: Ipso-Photo, co-curated with Stuart Koop, artists; Margaret Roberts, Chris Fortescue, Marie Sierra-Hughes, Phillip Watkins, at Centre for Contemporary Photography
- 1994: Don’t Stop, co-curated with Shiralee Saul, gallery shop and mail-order catalogue of works by thirty artists, Linden Gallery
- 1993: Immortality, Rose Farrell & George Parkin, Jeff Gibson, Chris Tabecki, Polixeni Papapetrou, Heather Fernon, at Centre for Contemporary Photography
- 1992: After the Fact: Photographs from the Police Forensic Archive, Victorian Centre for Photography

== Exhibitions ==
=== Solo ===
- 2013, to March 24: Infinite Image: Susan Fereday, Centre for Contemporary Photography, 404 George Street, Fitzroy
- 2013, to March 9: All Seeing, Sarah Scout Presents, 1a Crossley St, Melbourne
- 2008, to July 10: Under a Steel Sky, West Space
- 2005, to March 16: Susan Fereday : New Work, Sutton Gallery, 254 Brunswick St, Fitzroy

=== Group ===
- 2014, to May 11: Photographic Abstractions, selected by David Moore, with Andrew Browne, John Cato, Jo Daniell, John Delacour, Peter Elliston, Joyce Evans, Chantel Faust, Anthony Figallo, George Gittoes, John Gollings, Graeme Hare, Melinda Harper, Paul Knight, Peter Lambropoulos, Bruno Leti, Anne MacDonald, Grant Mudford, Harry Nankin, Ewa Narkiewicz, John Nixon, Rose Nolan, Jozef Stanislaw Ostoja-Kotkowski, Robert Owen, Wes Placek, Susan Purdy, Scott Redford, Jacky Redgate, Wolfgang Sievers, David Stephenson, Mark Strizic and Rick Wood. Monash Gallery of Art travelling exhibition, Redland Art Gallery, Cleveland, Queensland
- 2011, 14 May to 19 June: A Way of Calling, curated by Melissa Keys, Linden Centre for Contemporary Arts, Melbourne
- 2009: Photographer Unknown Monash University Museum of Art, curator Kyla McFarlane

== Collections ==
Fereday's work is held in the following public collection:

- National Gallery of Victoria, Melbourne, Victoria, Australia: 5 works (as of June 2018)

== See also ==
- List of contemporary artists
- List of Australian artists
