= Melinda Harper =

Australian artist (born 1965)

Melinda Harper (born 1965) is an Australian abstract artist. She works with a variety of media including drawing, collage, photography, screen printing, painted objects and embroideries. Her work is characterised by the use of colours, stripes and geometrical designs.

== Early life and career ==
Harper was born in Darwin, Northern Territory in 1965. She says a visit to the National Gallery of Australia, in particular to its American Abstract Expressionist collection, was instrumental in her decision to become an artist. She studied at Prahran Art School, graduating with a Bachelor of Fine Arts with a major in painting.

Her first exhibition was held at Melbourne's Pinacotheca Gallery in 1987.

She was one of a small number of artists (including Kerrie Poliness, Rose Nolan and Stephen Bram) who set up Store 5, an artist-run exhibition space in High Street, Prahran in 1989.

== Work ==
=== Major exhibitions ===
- Colour Sensation: The Works of Melinda Harper, Heide Museum of Modern Art (27 June 2015 - 25 October 2015)

=== Public collections ===
- National Gallery of Victoria
- Art Gallery of New South Wales
