= John Liebenberg =

South African photojournalist (1958–2020)

- Born: 3 March 1958; Johannesburg, South Africa
- Died: 16 February 2020 (aged 61); Johannesburg, South Africa
- Citizenship: South Africa
- Occupation: Photojournalist

John Arthur Liebenberg (3 March 1958 – 16 February 2020) was a South African photojournalist, known for documenting Namibia's independence struggle. He was one of the founding staff members and photographer at The Namibian.

== Early life and work ==
Liebenberg was born in 1958 in Johannesburg, South Africa, and since the age of two he had spent time in an orphanage in Johannesburg. His father had placed him and his sister in the orphanage for various reasons. At 18 years old he was conscripted as a soldier and sent to Namibia in 1976. Liebenberg had married in 1984 to Ute, an accomplished violinist. After three children, he and Ute divorced. He then married Inge Kühne in 2005, but they too divorced.

Liebenberg was an established news photographer whose works have been exhibited in Africa and Europe. He documented the South African Border War (preferably called Namibian War of Independence) that preceded Namibia's independence in 1990, Liebenberg also worked as a photographer in the Angolan Civil War, and was later employed as a magazine and freelance photographer in South Africa. In 2010 he co-authored a book with Patricia Hayes: Bush Of Ghosts: Life And War In Namibia 1986-90.

== Death ==
He was admitted to a hospital in Johannesburg after he broke his leg in a fall on 10 February 2020. He died on 16 February 2020 at age 61 in Johannesburg, South Africa, following complications in his recovery from surgery.
