= Photographies =

International academic journal on photography history and theory founded 2008

photographies
- Editor: Liz Wells, David Bate, Julia Peck
- Categories: academic journal of photography
- Frequency: 3 issues per annum
- Publisher: Routledge
- Founder: Liz Wells, David Bate
- Founded: 2008
- First issue: February 11, 2008; 18 years ago
- Company: Taylor & Francis
- Country: United Kingdom
- Based in: Abingdon, Oxfordshire
- Language: English
- ISSN: 1754-0763
- OCLC: 154687039

photographies is an academic peer-reviewed journal founded in 2008 by its editors David Bate of Westminster University and Liz Wells of Plymouth.

== The journal ==
The journal photographies (the masthead is in lower case) is published three times a year by Routledge as part of its Open Select publishing programme, which gives authors the option to publish articles that are available free online immediately on publication, with the benefits of reaching larger audiences and increasing impact.

=== Alternate use ===
Another periodical with this same title was a now defunct French magazine published 1987–1997, founded and edited by Jacques Ascher.

== Content ==
The journal photographies includes a section devoted to a visual essay, and its textual content addresses the history and theory of photography as an heterogeneous medium in a global context; technological changes affecting photography, including the impact of computational/machine vision and imaging, and more recently, imaging by artificial intelligence; connections between photography and memory; critical debates on representation, ethics; and broader visual culture issues, including social, political, practice-led research and educational dimensions.

Editor David Bate writes:

If the history of photography and the practice of criticism began by the men and women who collected photography in the first place, photography theory in its critical (rather than purely technical) sense was advanced to challenge precisely the normative orthodoxies of the older models of the discipline. While all these disciplines may or may not be much changed today we are conscious of the work that still needs to be done.

Anthony Luvera, reviewing the inaugural issue, notes its focus...

...on the ramifications of digital imaging and technology on photography. In a lengthy introductory editorial statement the editors rationalize the relevance of their thematic compilation. They point out that now that the initial shock of the “digital revolution” that pervaded the very end of the twentieth century has worn off, and the forecasted death of photography by digital imaging did not occur, it is time to address the fact that “photography thrived and developed in new ways (and) much of the critical apparatus surrounding it lost its impetus in respect of interrogating and understanding these developments.

== Contributors ==
At 2025, Julia Peck of the University of the Arts, London had recently joined the editorial team of Wells and Bate. Editors of early issues (with the founders) were Sarah Kember and Martin Lister, and issues often include guest editors. Contributors have included Charlotte Cotton, Geoffrey Batchen, Patricia Hayes, André Gunthert, Carol Mavor, Daniel Palmer, Olivier Richon, Howard Caygill Elizabeth Edwards, Joanna Zylinska, John Tagg.

The editorial advisory board members as at 2025 are: Claude Baillargeon, Oakland University, USA; Geoffrey Batchen, University of Oxford, UK; Justin Carville, Institute of Art, Design & Technology, Ireland; Victor del Rio, Universidad Nacional de Educación a Distancia, Spain; Heather Diack, Toronto Metropolitan University, Canada; Patrizia Di Bello, Birkbeck, University of London, UK; Andrew Dewdney, South Bank University, UK; Erina Duganne, Texas State University, USA; Jae Emerling, University of North Carolina at Charlotte, USA; Paul Frosh, Hebrew University, Israel; Martin Hand, Queen's University, Canada; Patricia Hayes, University of the Western Cape, South Africa; Michelle Henning, University of Liverpool, UK; Sarah Kember, Goldsmiths, University of London, UK; Jonas Larsen, Roskilde University, Denmark; Martin Lister, University of the West of England, Bristol; Daniel Palmer, Royal Melbourne Institute of Technology, Australia; Julia Peck, University of Gloucestershire, UK; Steffen Siegel, Folkwang Universität der Künste, Germany; Katrina Sluis, Australian National University, Australia; Oh Soon-Hwa, Nanyang Technological University, Singapore; Theopisti Stylianou-Lambert, Cyprus University of Technology, Cyprus; Anna-Kaisa Rastenberger, Finnish Museum of Photography, Finland; Alexander Supartono, Edinburgh Napier University, UK; Roberta Valtorta, Centro Bauer, Milan, Italy; Louise Wolthers, Hasselblad Foundation, Sweden.

== Conferences ==
photographies journal organised international conferences in 2017 ('Critical Issues in Photography Today' University of Westminster, London, May 18–19), 2020 ('Photography in Asia', Singapore, January), and 2022 ("Boundaries and Borders," University of Texas at San Antonio, 22–24 September) which contributed material for its pages. In March 2024, the editors David Bate and Liz Wells were joined by advisory board members Erina Duganne and Martin Hand at the Society for Photographic Education (SPE) annual conference in St Louis, Missouri on a panel discussing ‘Academic Writing in an Era of Change’ using the example of photographies journal.

== Impact ==
As at 2026 photographies has published 330 articles which in turn have received 1348 citations. In its founding year it published 11 papers, increasing to 25 in 2025. Its intended audience is researchers, academics, and students. For its peer review and editorial processes researchers from multiple university departments are appointed.
