= Patricia Hayes (historian) =

Historian

Patricia Hayes is a professor of the University of the Western Cape who focuses on various subjects tied to colonial photography. She has done work on colonial Namibian history and is currently researching political and documentary photography in South Africa while teaching African History, Gender and History, and Visual History.

== Personal life ==
Hayes was born and raised in Zimbabwe. She received her PhD from Cambridge University in 1992 with her work on the colonisation of northern Namibia and southern Angola. She worked briefly in the United States in 1992 and 1993 and has held fellowships in the UK, USA, and Brazil. She is now working in the History Department at the University of the Western Cape in South Africa. She has been awarded the Vice Chancellor's Teaching Award there.

== Scholarly work ==
Hayes guest edited journal issues on visuality and gender in African history, such as Kronos: South African Histories in 2000 and 2025 and Gender & History in 2006. Her recent research has dealt with photography and history in South Africa, especially under the apartheid period about which she has contributed to such journals as African Studies Review, Journal of Southern African Studies, African Affairs, Social Dynamics, Cultural Critique, History and Theory, and photographies. She is currently running the Visual History research project at the University of Western Cape. This project focuses on Southern African documentary photography. The Colonizing Camera was shortlisted for the Sunday Times Alan Paton Award in 1998 when it was published.

=== Works ===
The Colonizing Camera: Photographs in the Making of Namibian History is a book that Hayes helped write on colonisation within Southern Africa.

Bush of Ghosts is a photographic narrative that uses co-author John Liebenberg's photos, taken between 1986 and 1990, of the Border War between South Africa and Namibia. Hayes provides contextualizing essays to the photos and comments between herself and John Liebenberg about the war.

== Publications ==
List of Publications:

- 'Seeing and Being Seen. Politics, art and the everyday in the Durban photography of Omar Badsha, 1960s-1980s’ in Africa, 81/4, 2011, pp 1 – 23.
- ‘The form of the norm: spectres of gender in South African photography of the 1980s’ in Social Dynamics Special Issue on Scripted Bodies, Spring 2011.
- John Liebenberg & Patricia Hayes, Bush of Ghosts. Life and War in Namibia (Cape Town: Umuzi Random House, 2010).
- ‘Poisoned landscapes’ in Santu Mofokeng, Thirty Years of Photo Essays (Paris: Prestel, 2011).
- ‘Santu Mofokeng, Photographs. “The violence is in the knowing”’ in History & Theory, Special Issue on History & Photography, Fall 2009.
- ‘A Land of Goshen: Landscape & Kingdom in 19th century Eastern Ovambo, Northern Namibia’ in Michael Bollig & Olaf Bubenzer (eds), African Landscapes. Interdisciplinary Approaches (New York: Springer, 2009).
- ‘When you shake a tree: pre colonial & postcolonial in northern Namibian history’ in Derek Peterson and Giacomo Macola (eds), Recasting the Past (Athens: Ohio University Press, 2009).
- Wolfram Hartmann, Jeremy Silvester and Patricia Hayes (eds.). The Colonising Camera: Photographs in the Making of Namibian History. Cape Town, Windhoek and Athens: UCT Press, Out of Africa and Ohio University Press, 1998.
- Patricia Hayes, 'Sankuru, Katako Kombe' & 'Crânes d'Eléphants envoyés au Musée', in Carl De Keyzer & Johan Lagae, Congo belge en images (Lannoo: Tielt, 2010), ISBN 978-90-209-8708-9.
- ‘Night, shadow, smoke, mist, blurring, occlusion and abeyance: Santu Mofokeng’ in Art South Africa Volume 08 Issue 02, 2009.
- ‘Power, Secrecy, Proximity: a history of South African photography’ in Kronos, Vol 33.
- ‘Visual emergency? Fusion and fragmentation in South African photography of the 1980s’ in Camera Austria, Vol 100/2007, 18–22.
- Patricia Hayes (ed), Visual Genders, Visual Histories (Oxford: Blackwell).
- Wendy Woodward, Gary Minkley and Patricia Hayes (eds), Deep Histories: Gender and Colonialism in Southern Africa (Amsterdam: Rodopi)
- Patricia Hayes, Jeremy Silvester, Marion Wallace & Wolfram Hartmann (eds.). Namibia under South African rule: mobility and containment, 1915-1946 (London, Windhoek & Athens OH: James Currey, Out of Africa & Ohio University Press).

== See also ==
- Santu Mofokeng
