= Geoffrey Batchen =

Australian art historian

- Born: 21 November 1956 (age 69); Melbourne, Australia
- Occupations: Art historian and academic
- Title: Professor of the History of Art

Academic background
- Education: University of Sydney
- Doctoral advisor: Vicki Kirby

Academic work
- Discipline: Art history
- Sub-discipline: History of photography; Global history; Material culture
- Institutions: University of California, San Diego; University of New Mexico; City University of New York; Victoria University of Wellington; Trinity College, Oxford

Geoffrey Batchen (born 21 November 1956, Melbourne, Australia) is an Australian art historian. Since 2020, Batchen has been Professor of Art History at the University of Oxford and a fellow of Trinity College.

== Career ==
=== Professor ===
Assistant Professor, Visual Arts, University of California, San Diego, 1991–1996; Associate Professor, Art and Art History, University of New Mexico, Albuquerque, 1996–2001; Professor of Art History: City University of New York Graduate Center, New York City, 2002–2010; Victoria University of Wellington, New Zealand, 2010–2019.

Much of Batchen's work as a professor and curator focuses on the history of photography, a field in which he publishes books and contributes to journals including Journal of Visual Culture, Art History, History of Photography, The Art Bulletin, Membrana: Journal of Photography, British Art Studies, Aperture, Trans Asia Photography, World Art, Photographica, and photographies.

=== Curator ===
His curated exhibitions have been shown at the Museu Nacional de Belas Artes in Rio de Janeiro; the New England Regional Art Museum in Amridale, Australia; the Van Gogh Museum in Amsterdam; the National Media Museum in Bradford, England; the International Center of Photography in New York; the Wallraf-Richartz-Museum in Cologne, Germany; the Izu Photo Museum in Shizuoka, Japan; the National Museum of Iceland in Reykjavik; the Adam Art Gallery in Wellington, New Zealand; the Govett-Brewster Art Gallery in New Plymouth, NZ; and the Centre for Contemporary Photography in Melbourne, Australia.

== Bibliography ==
- Burning with Desire: The Conception of Photography (MIT Press, 1997)
- Each Wild Idea: Writing, Photography, History (MIT Press, 2001)
- Forget Me Not: Photography and Remembrance (Princeton Architectural Press, 2004)
- William Henry Fox Talbot (Phaidon Press, France, 2008)
- What of Shoes: Van Gogh and Art History (E. A. Seemann, 2009)
- Photography Degree Zero: Reflections on Roland Barthes's Camera Lucida (MIT Press, 2009)
- Suspending Time: Life, Photography, Death (2010)
- Emanations: The Art of the Cameraless Photograph (Prestel Publishing, 2016)
- Apparitions: Photography and Dissemination (Power Publications, 2018)
- Negative/Positive: A History of Photography (Routledge, 2020)
