= History of Photography (journal) =

Academic journal founded in 1977

- Discipline: Photography
- Language: English
- Edited by: Patrizia Di Bello

Publication details
- Publisher: Taylor & Francis
- Frequency: Quarterly

Standard abbreviations
- ISO 4: Hist. Photogr.

Indexing
- ISSN: 0308-7298

Links
- Journal homepage

History of Photography, founded in 1977, is a quarterly peer-reviewed academic journal covering the history of photography and published by Taylor & Francis. The editor-in-chief is Patrizia Di Bello (Birkbeck College, University of London). The journal is abstracted and indexed in America: History and Life, Art Index, Avery Index to Architectural Periodicals, Bibliography of the History of Art, British Humanities Index, Historical Abstracts, Scopus, Current Contents/Arts & Humanities, and the Arts and Humanities Citation Index.
