= Rose Nolan =

Australian artist

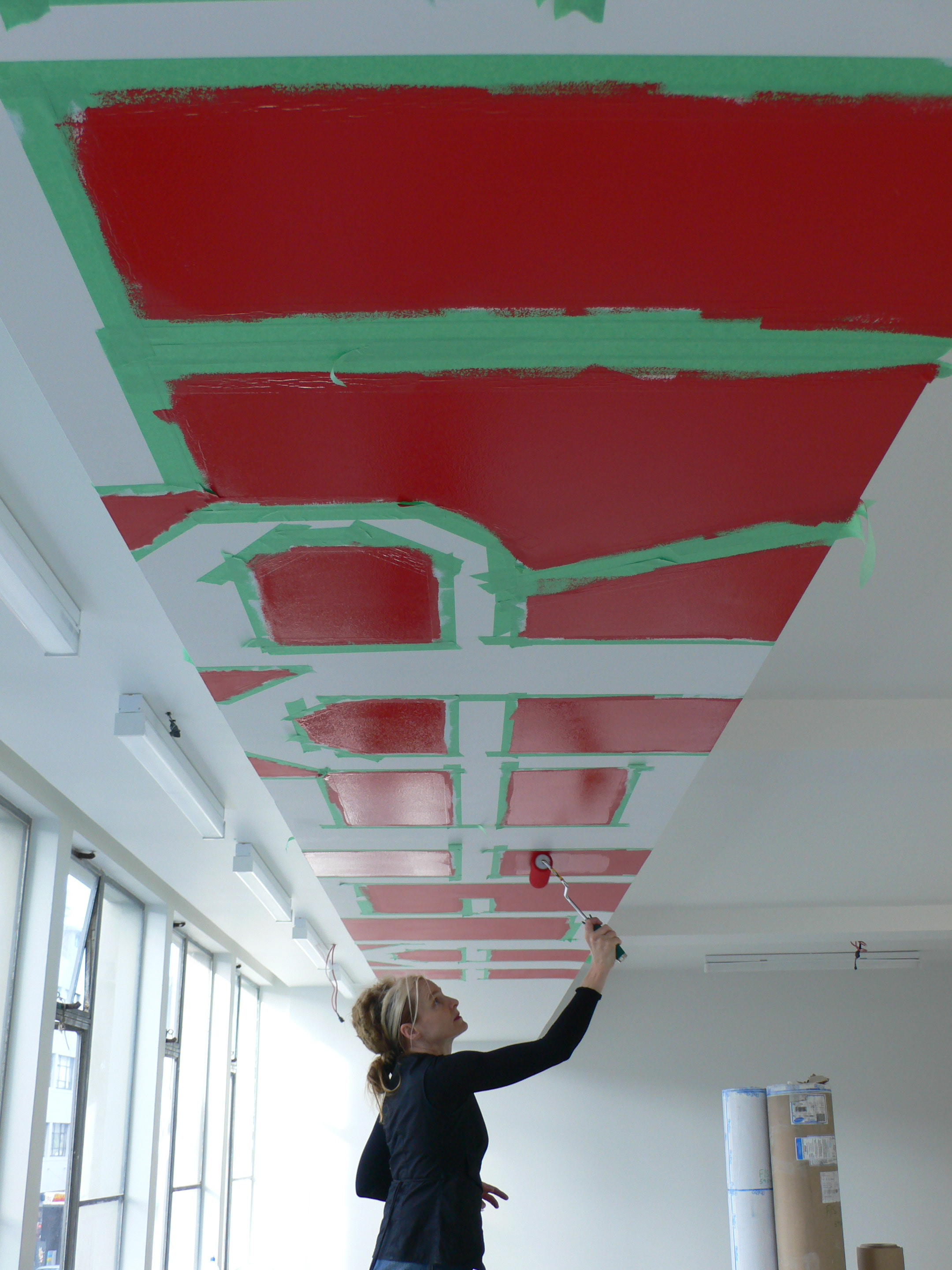
Rose Nolan installing a work at the Hamish McKay Gallery, Wellington New Zealand, 2007

Rose Nolan (born 1959) is an Australian visual artist based in Melbourne with work held in the collection of the Museum of Contemporary Art Australia. She makes work in a variety of material forms: books, small sculptures, photographs, posters, paintings, banners, multiples and large-scale installations. A reduced palette of red and white is characteristic of her work. She uses raw and inexpensive materials, such as hessian and cardboard; with the work displaying an unmistakable sense of personal labour through its handmade aesthetic.

== Career ==
Nolan was a member of the group of artists who formed ‘Store 5’, a loose experimental collective and artist-run space based in Melbourne between 1989 and 1993. She was one of a group of Australian artists who were part a loose cooperative and space connected to the experimental Store 5 Melbourne ARI between 1989 and 1993. The Store 5 artists shared an interest in the traditions of non-objective art, a form of art that relinquishes describing the exterior world in favour of examining the artwork in its material form. Frequent tropes include language, concentrating on the linguistic qualities of words and their connection to architectural space as a material form . Additionally conceptual art, as well the aesthetics of Russian constructivism which adopts the language of abstraction and revolutionary aesthetics and its relationship to a pragmatic utilitarian approach to art, architecture and design with utopian, even revolutionary, social ideals continue to inform Nolan's work today. Since the 1980s Nolan has exhibited widely, both nationally and internationally. Nolan is represented by Anna Schwartz Gallery.

== Selected exhibitions ==
Selected shows include

- f_OCUS, Counihan Gallery, Brunswick, (2020)
- Bauhaus Now, Buxton Contemporary Art, Melbourne, curated by Ann Stephen, (2019)
- The National 2017; New Australian Art, Museum of Contemporary Art, Sydney, (2017)
- GIVE OR TAKE, Public Art Commission, Monash University Caulfield Library , (2017)
- Let's Talk About Text, Artbank, Sydney, (2017)
- Big Words – To keep going, breathing helps (circle work), Museum of Contemporary Art, Sydney, (2016–17)
- Image Worth Reading, Key Projects, Long Island City, New York (2015)
- Big Words – UP DATE/DOWN LOAD (circle work), Art Basel, Hong Kong, (2014)
- Taking it all away: MCA Collection, Museum of Contemporary Art Australia, Sydney, (2014)
- Performance Architecture, Anna Schwartz Gallery, Melbourne (2013)
- It’s okay to be alright Melbourne Art Tram. Commissioned by Yarra Trams and Melbourne Festival, (2013)
- Melbourne Now, National Gallery of Victoria, Melbourne, 2013
- Panorama de 31 artistas internacionales, MINUS SPACE en Oaxaca, Multiple Cultural Venues, Oaxaca, Mexico, curated by Matthew Deleget & Emi Winter (2012)
- Forever Young: 30 Years of the Heide Collection, Heide Museum of Modern Art, Melbourne, (2011)
- The Solo Projects, VCA Margaret Lawrence Gallery, Melbourne International Arts Festival (2011)
- It's not good to worry about space, Museum of Contemporary Art, Sydney, (2008)
- Why Do We Do The Things We Do, Institute of Modern Art, Brisbane (2008)
- Whenever, Christchurch Art Gallery, New Zealand, (2007)
- Work in Progress #3, Ian Potter Museum of Art, Melbourne (2002)
- White trash banners: Congratulations!, It's a girl!, Mother and daughter are both well!, First tooth!, She walked for the first time!, She said 'Papa' for the first time! The Potter Museum of Art, (1996)
- My way to God # 1-30, Store 5, Melbourne, (1990)
- No.One, Store 5, Melbourne (1989)

== Selected reviews ==
Reviews include

- The national, New Australian Art, Kelly McDonald, Big Words – To keep going, breathing helps (circle work), (2017)
- Rose Nolan, With all one’s might and main, Chris McAuliffe, Project Space, RMIT, 1996, (2014)
- Un Projects, Carolyn Barnes, Conflicted Territory: Aesthetics and practices in the work of Melinda Harper, Anne-Marie May, Rose Nolan and Kerrie Poliness, 2012)
- Art Gallery of New South Wales Contemporary Collection Handbook, An orange constructed one, (2006)
- Frieze, Sue Cramer, Forever, Ian Potter Museum, Melbourne, Australia, (2002)

== Selected publications ==
- Big Words (Not Mine) – Read the words 'public space'... Published by Negative Press, (2017)
- Enough, Rose Nolan, Limited edition, Published by Negative Press (2016)
- Rose Nolan, Why Do We Do The Things We Do, 2011, Eds.: Blair French, Robert Leonard, Published by Artspace Sydney and Institute of Modern Art. (2011)
