= Photography & Culture =

- Discipline: Photography
- Language: English
- Edited by: Erina Duganne, Sarah Parsons, Gil Pasternak, Yunchang Yang

Publication details
- History: 2008-present
- Publisher: Taylor & Francis
- Frequency: Quarterly

Standard abbreviations
- ISO 4: Photogr. Cult.

Indexing
- ISSN: 1751-4517 (print); 1751-4525 (web)
- LCCN: 2009210520
- OCLC no.: 243713765

Links
- Journal homepage; Online access; Online archive

Photography & Culture is a quarterly peer-reviewed academic journal, published by Taylor & Francis. It was founded in 2008 by Val Williams (University of the Arts London, UK) and was initially published triannually by Berg Publishers and then by Bloomsbury Publishing until 2015. Photography & Culture’s editors-in-chief are Erina Duganne (Texas State University, USA), Sarah Parsons (York University, Canada), Gil Pasternak (De Montfort University, Photographic History Research Centre, UK), and Yunchang Yang (Peking University, China).

== Aims and scope ==
The official Journal's webpage states that:

"Photography & Culture is aimed at advancing the study of photography through direct considerations of its reciprocal relationship with culturally defined environments, conventions, heritage and politics.

"The journal embraces the prevalence of changing definitions for both 'photography' and 'culture', encouraging the development of knowledge about the dynamic nature of their correspondence with one another across geographies and temporalities. As such, the journal takes interest in photography's employment and cultural work within local and global contexts—from the early nineteenth century to the present day, and in connection with any analogue or digital artistic, professional, amateur and vernacular photographic practices.

"Since its establishment in 2008, the journal has provided a platform for the empirical, theoretical and visual work of recognised and emerging researchers alike. It has published full-length scholarly articles alongside shorter discursive critiques, reviews, and photographic portfolios. The journal has equally demonstrated its continued commitment to promoting internationally diverse research of multi- and inter-disciplinary character. It has actively sought individual submissions and proposals for special issues from a boundless range of academic fields, including anthropology, art history, cultural history, material culture, media studies, sociology, visual culture, visual politics, and many others.

"This vibrant and inclusive approach to the study of photography has rapidly turned Photography & Culture into a key resource for scholars, practitioners, archivists, curators, and students of all academic levels concerned with photographic history, theory, and practice."

== Abstracting and indexing ==
The journal is abstracted and indexed in:

- Anthropological Index Online
- Art Abstracts
- Art and Architecture Index
- ARTbibliographies Modern
- Arts and Humanities Citation Index
- Biography Index Past and Present
- British Humanities Index
- Current Contents/Arts and Humanities
- International Bibliography of Book Reviews of Scholarly Literature in the Humanities and Social Sciences
- International Bibliography of Periodical Literature on the Humanities and Social Sciences
- Scopus
