= Collingwood Yards =

Arts organization in Melbourne, Australia

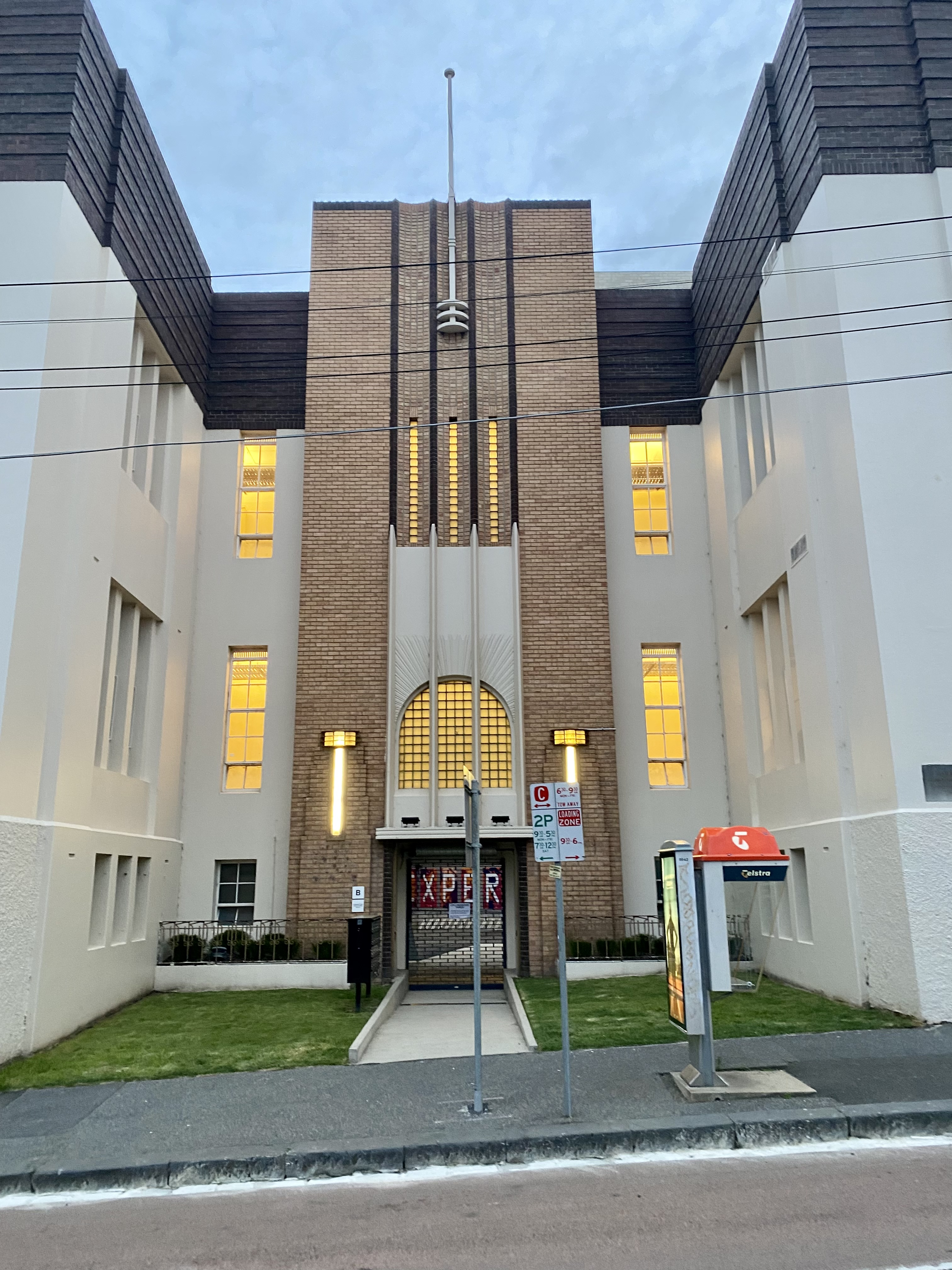
- Art deco features in a heritage building
- Interactive map of Collingwood Yards
- Location: 35 Johnston St, Collingwood, Victoria, Australia

Construction
- Opened: 13 March 2021

Website
- collingwoodyards.org

Collingwood Yards is a not-for-profit arts organization and arts precinct located in Collingwood, a suburb of Melbourne, Australia. Collingwood Yards hosts visual artists, musicians, performers and a range of arts organisations across a large inner city site and forms part of the Collingwood Arts Precinct which includes Circus Oz. It provided accommodation to more than thirty Arts-related organisations on a not-for-profit basis.

== History ==
Collingwood Yards was officially opened on 13 March 2021. It is located on the site of the former Collingwood Technical School or College which closed in 2005. The buildings lay dormant for close to a decade before being redeveloped. The area was first established in 1871 as the Collingwood Artisans’ School of Design, and then became the Collingwood Technical School from 1921 until 1968, when it was renamed Collingwood Technical College until the site was closed in 2005.

The Victorian State Government, through the Creative Victoria agency, took over management of the site in 2010. The area was initially developed into a new home for Circus Oz, which takes up approximately half of the former school grounds. The rest of the site, comprising three buildings, was subsequently redeveloped over two years to create the Collingwood Yards Contemporary Arts Precinct.

== Architecture ==
The site has three buildings including a striking art deco entrance on Johnston St. The recent development was designed by architecture firm Fieldwork.

A notable mural was painted on an exterior wall of the Technical College by the American artist Keith Haring in 1984. It was restored in 2019 as part of the redevelopment of the site.
