= British Humanities Index =

Bibliographic database covering humanities literature published in English

- Producer: ProQuest
- History: 1963 to present
- Languages: English

Print edition
- ISSN: 0007-0815

Links
- Website: www.proquest.com/products-services/bhi-set-c.html

The British Humanities Index is a database published by ProQuest that indexes journals, magazines, and newspapers published in Great Britain and other English-speaking countries. The Oxford guide to library research described it as a "particularly good British source," stating that it had "headings of its own devising." It covers more than 400 periodicals beginning in 1962. Walford stated in 1985 that "BHI's title is something of a misnomer, since its c375 titles indexed include some 68 social science periodicals, plus a sprinkling of Australian, Canadian, and New Zealand titles." A guide for scientific researchers advised "don't let the [BHI's] title put you off using this index; it has some excellent references to general scientific articles."
