= Kohei Yoshiyuki =

Japanese photographer (1946–2022)

Kohei Yoshiyuki (吉行耕平, Yoshiyuki Kōhei; 1946 – 21 January 2022) was a Japanese photographer whose work included "Kōen" (公園, Park), photographs of people at night in sexual activities in parks in Tokyo. Prints from The Park are held in the collections of the Museum of Modern Art and Metropolitan Museum of Art, New York; San Francisco Museum of Modern Art (SFMOMA); Museum of Contemporary Photography, Chicago; and Museum of Fine Arts, Houston. Examples from the series were included in the exhibition Exposed: Voyeurism, Surveillance and the Camera at Tate Modern, SFMOMA and the Walker Art Center.

== Life and work ==
He attracted much attention in 1979 with his exhibition "Kōen" (公園, Park) at the Komai Gallery, Tokyo. The black and white photographs were presented in a book published in 1980 that is "nominally a soft-core voyeur's manual", with photographs of people at night in sexual activities in Shinjuku and Yoyogi parks (both in Tokyo), mostly with unknown spectators around them. The photographs were taken with a 35 mm camera, infrared film and a flash with a special filter. Gerry Badger and others have commented on how the photographs raise questions about the boundaries between spectator, voyeur and participant.

He died on 21 January 2022, at the age of 76.

== Publications ==
- Dokyumento: Kōen (ドキュメント公園, Document: Park). Sebun Mukku 4. Tokyo: Sebun-sha, 1980.
  - The Park. Stuttgart/Berlin: Hatje Cantz, 2007. ISBN 978-3-7757-2085-4. With an introduction by Yossi Milo, an essay by Vince Aletti, and a transcript of an interview between Yoshiyuki and Nobuyoshi Araki.
  - The Park. Santa Fe, NM: Radius; New York City: Yossi Milo, 2019. ISBN 9781942185482. With an introduction by Yossi Milo, an essay by Aletti, and a transcript of an interview between Yoshiyuki and Araki. Includes new images and documentary materials.
- Tōsatsu! Sunahama no koibito-tachi: Uwasa no rabu airando sennyū satsueiki (盗撮！砂浜の恋人たち：噂のラブアイランド潜入撮影記). Sandē-sha, 1983. ISBN 978-4-88203-022-5.
- Middonaito fōkasu: Mayonaka no sekigaisen tōsatsu (ミッドナイト・フォーカス：真夜中の赤外線盗撮). Tokyo: Tokuma, 1989. ISBN 978-4-19-503985-4.
- Yoshiyuki Kōhei shashinshū: Sekigai kōsen (吉行耕平写真集：赤外光線). Tokyo: Hokusōsha, 1992. ISBN 978-4-938620-36-3.

== Collections ==
Yoshiyuki's work is held in the following permanent collections:

- Metropolitan Museum of Art, New York: 2 prints (as of 2 February 2022)
- Museum of Modern Art, New York: 4 prints (as of 2 February 2022)
- San Francisco Museum of Modern Art, San Francisco: 5 prints (as of 2 February 2022)
- Museum of Contemporary Photography, Chicago: 4 prints (as of 2 February 2022)
- Museum of Fine Arts, Houston: 2 prints (as of 2 February 2022)

== Exhibitions ==
=== Solo exhibitions ===
- The Park, Yossi Milo Gallery, New York, 2007

=== Group exhibitions ===
- Exposed: Voyeurism, Surveillance and the Camera, Tate Modern, London, 2010; San Francisco Museum of Modern Art, 2010–12; Walker Art Center, Minneapolis, 2011. Included work from The Park.
