= Kerrie Poliness =

- Born: 1962 (age 63–64); Melbourne, Australia
- Education: Victoria University, Melbourne
- Known for: Abstract Wall Drawings

Kerrie Poliness is a contemporary Australian artist, known for her rule-based painting and drawing works that revisit the ideas and practices of conceptual art.

Poliness was born in 1962 and grew up in Melbourne. She completed her Bachelor degree in Victoria University in 1984, majoring in fine art.

She was a co-founder of the Store 5 group of artists, an artist-run space focusing on geometric abstraction.

== Public collections ==
Poliness's work uses a palette of red, green, yellow and some black, and appears in public and private collections across Australia and New Zealand.

She is featured in major state galleries such as Art Gallery of Western Australia, National Gallery of Australia, National Gallery of Victoria, Queensland Art Gallery, as well as corporate, private and university collections throughout Australia, including Artbank Australia, Bendigo Art Gallery, Deakin University, Dowse Museum, Griffith University, Maddocks, Margaret Stewart Endowment, Monash University, Museum of Contemporary Art Australia, Museum of Modern Art at Heide, University of Melbourne, and the University of Wollongong.

== Exhibitions ==
Her exhibitions and collections throughout Australia as well as overseas include:

=== Solo exhibitions ===
- 2018 Field Drawing #1, hota, Gold Coast
- 2016 Red Matter Wall Drawing #2, Museum of Contemporary Art Australia
- 2014 Landscape Paintings (Lake Bolac and Zagreb) and Wave Drawings (orange and green), G-MK, Zagreb
- 2013 Field Drawing, the Agora, La Trobe University; Kerrie Poliness: Black O, Dowse Art Museum
- 2008 Blue Wall Drawing #1, University of Wollongong
- 2007 Blue Wall Drawing, Anna Schwartz Gallery
- 2006 Wall Drawings, Dunedin Public Art Gallery
- 2004 Something & Something Somewhere Else, North Melbourne Town Hall; Wall Works, National Gallery of Australia
- 1999 The Pipestacks (permanent installation), Pipemakers Park
- 1998 Wall Drawings, Artspace, Auckland; Wall Drawings, Art Gallery of Western Australia, Perth
- 1997 Black O Wall Drawings 1 - 6, Sarah Cottier Gallery, Sydney
  - Red Matter Wall Drawings 1 - 3, Kovacka 3 gallery, Dubrovnik\
  - Black O Wall Drawings 3 & 4, Museum of the City of Rovinj, Istria
- 1996 Red Matter Wall Drawings #1 - #4, Tolarno Galleries, Melbourne
- 1995 Wall Drawing #1, Phoenix Hotel, San Francisco
  - Drawings, Sarah Cottier Gallery, Sydney
  - Black O Wall Drawings 3 & 4, CBD Gallery, Sydney
- 1994 Pavilion #2, Tolarno Galleries, Melbourne
  - Red Matter Wall Drawings #1 - #4, Sarah Cottier Gallery, Sydney
- 1993 Pivilion #1, No. 140, Store 5, Melbourne
- 1992 136 Paintings, Tolarno Galleries, Melbourne
  - No. 123, Store 5, Melbourne
- 1991 12 Paintings, Tolarno Galleries, Melbourne
  - 104 Paintings, Deakin University Gallery, Geelong, Victoria
- Wall Painting, No. 99, Store 5, Melbourne
- 1990 No.55, Store 5, Melbourne
- 1989 No.4, Store 5, Melbourne, No.25, Store 5, Melbourne
- 1987 Shattered Plywood Paintings, 312 Lennox Street, Melbourne

=== Site-specific public artworks ===
- 2014 Field Drawing #1, Gallery of Modern Art, Brisbane
- 2013 Wave Drawings, Highpoint Shopping Centre, Melbourne
- 1998 The Agora, La Trobe University, Melbourne
  - Black O Wall Drawings, Monash University Library, Melbourne
- 2000 The Government Superannuation Building, Melbourne
