= Prahran =

- Suburb
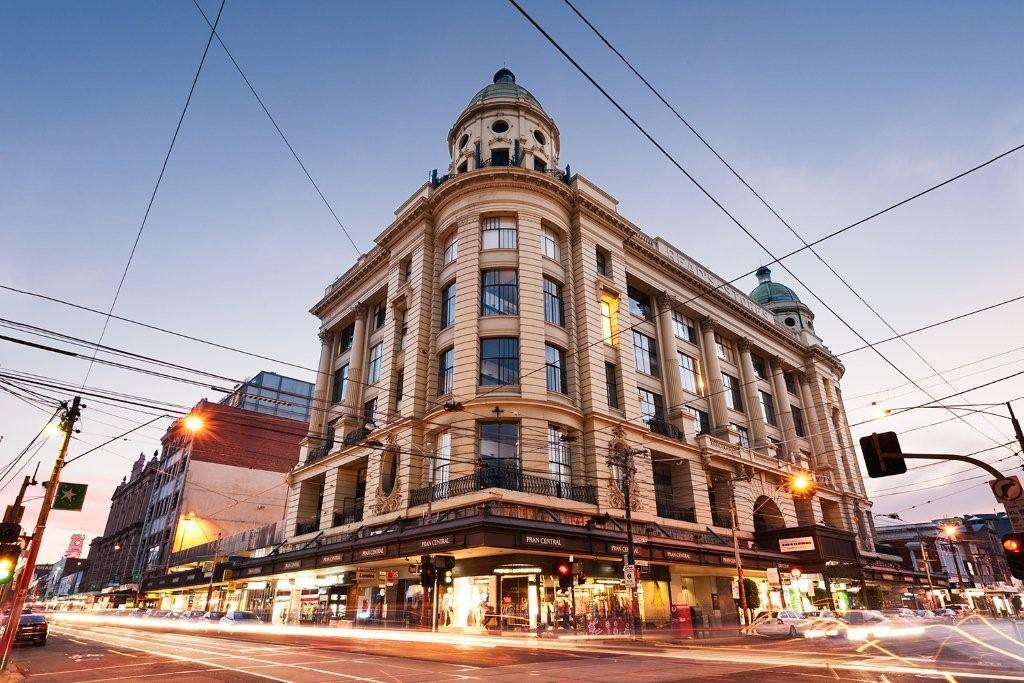
- Pran Central on the corner of Chapel Street and Commercial Road

- Interactive map of Prahran
- Coordinates: 37.852°S 144.998°E
- Country: Australia
- State: Victoria
- City: Melbourne
- LGA: City of Stonnington
- Location: 5 km (3.1 mi) from Melbourne
- Established: 1837

Government
  - State electorate: Prahran
  - Federal divisions: Kooyong; Melbourne

Area
  - Total: 2.1 km^{2} (0.81 sq mi)
- Elevation: 21 m (69 ft)

Population
  - Total: 12,203 (2021 census)
  - Density: 5,810/km^{2} (15,100/sq mi)
- Postcode: 3181
Suburbs around Prahran
Melbourne	South Yarra	Toorak
Melbourne CBD	Prahran	Armadale
St Kilda	Windsor	St Kilda East

Prahran (/prəˈræn/ prə-RAN, also colloquially /pəˈræn/ pə-RAN or /præn/ PRAN) is an inner suburb in Melbourne, Victoria, Australia, 5 km south-east of Melbourne's Central Business District, located within the City of Stonnington local government area. Prahran recorded a population of 12,203 at the 2021 census.

Prahran is a part of Greater Melbourne, with many shops, restaurants and cafes. Chapel Street is a mix of upscale fashion boutiques and cafes. Greville Street, once the centre of Melbourne's hippie community, has many cafés, bars, restaurants, bookstores, clothing shops and music shops.

Prahran takes its name from Pur-ra-ran, a Boonwurrung word which was thought to mean "land partially surrounded by water". When naming began the suburbs spelling was intended to be Praharan and pronounced Pur-ra-ran, but a spelling mistake on a government form lead to the name Prahran. More recently the word Pur-ra-ran has been identified as a transcription of "Birrarung", the name for the Yarra River, or a specific point of it.

== History ==
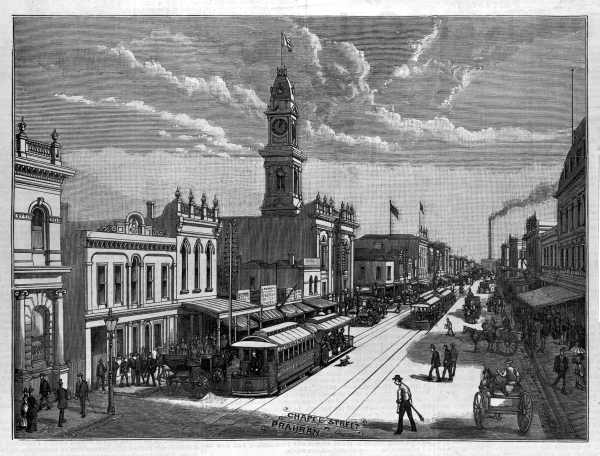
Chapel Street scene in 1889

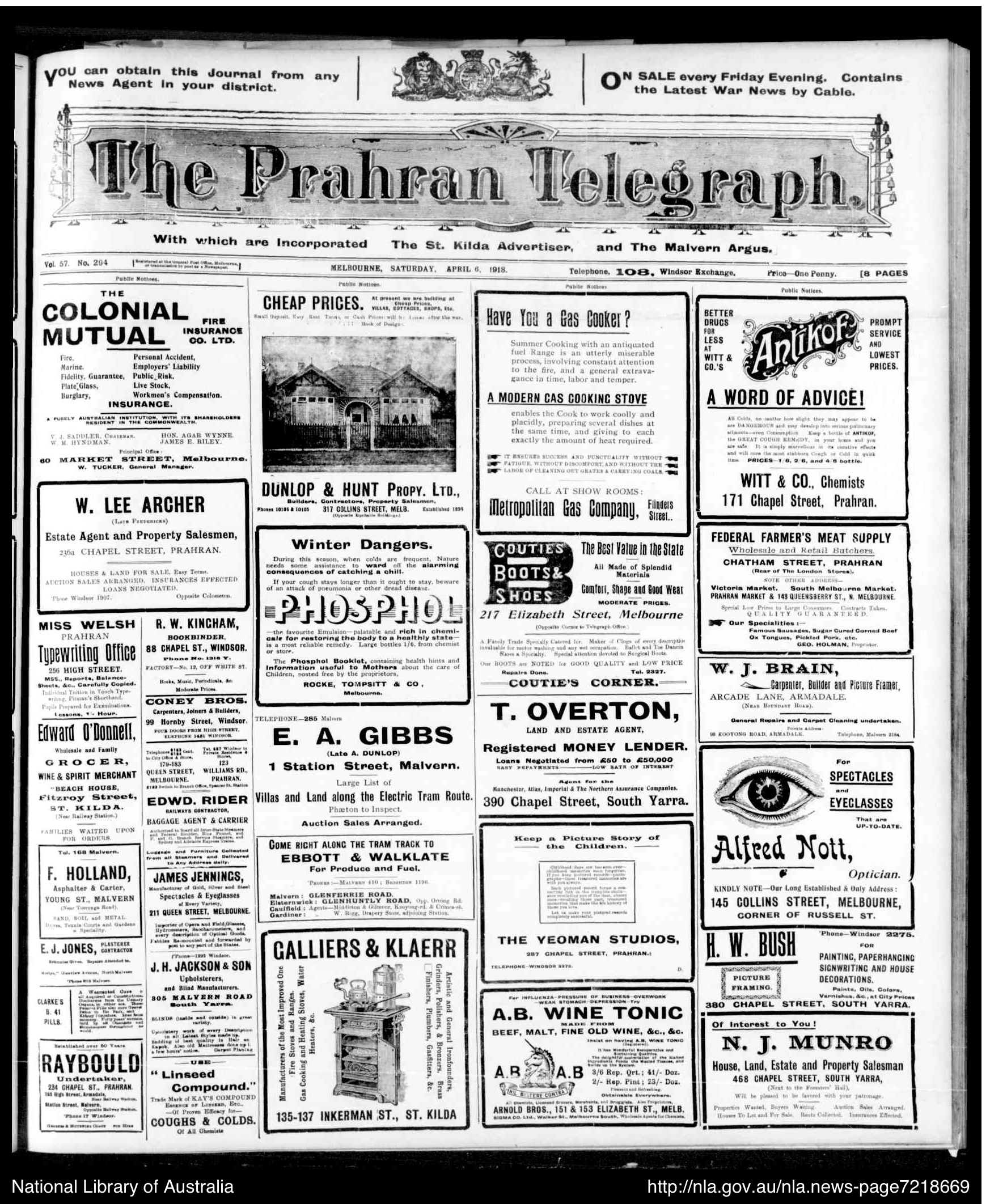
Prahran Telegraph front page from April 1918

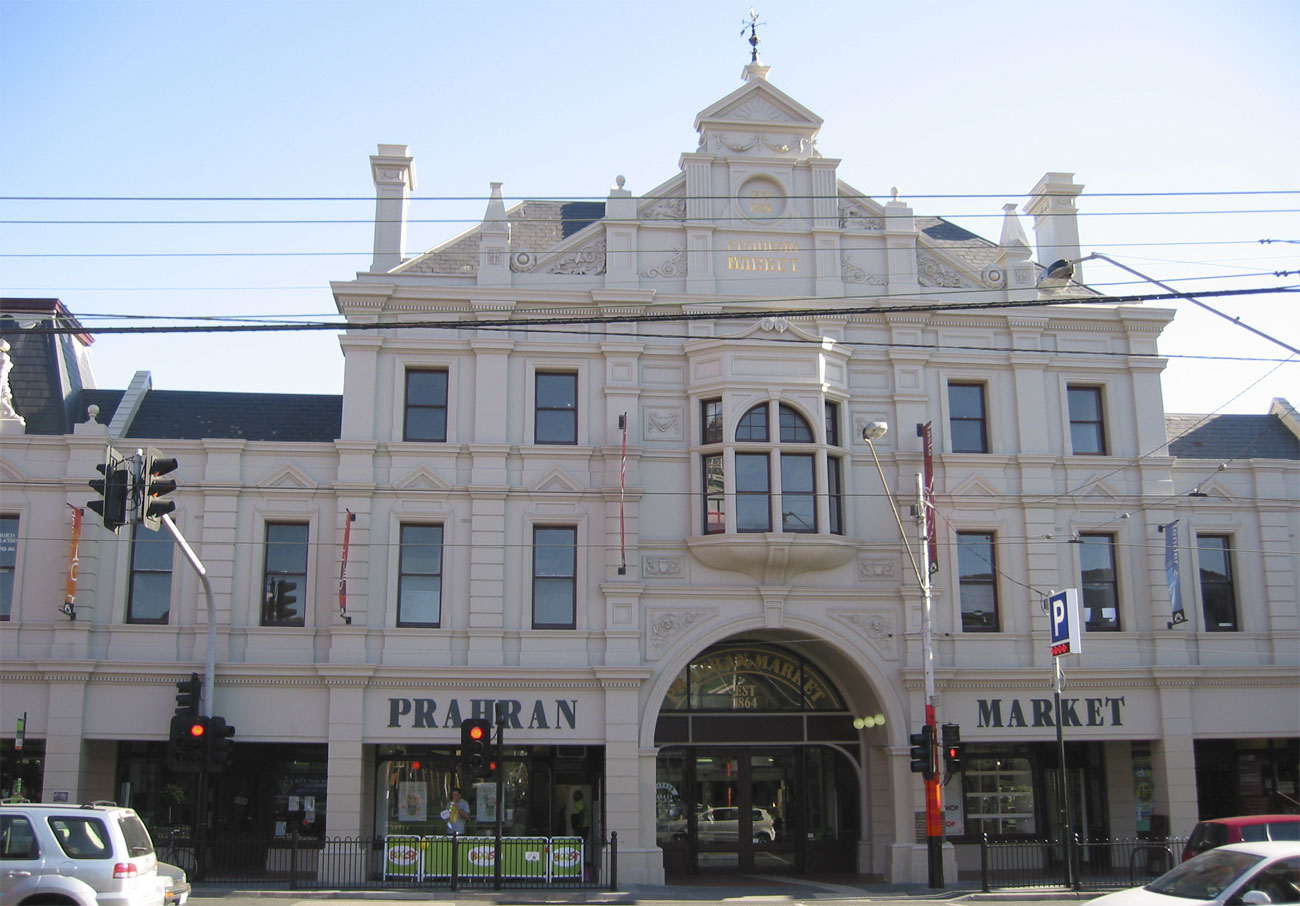
Prahran Market

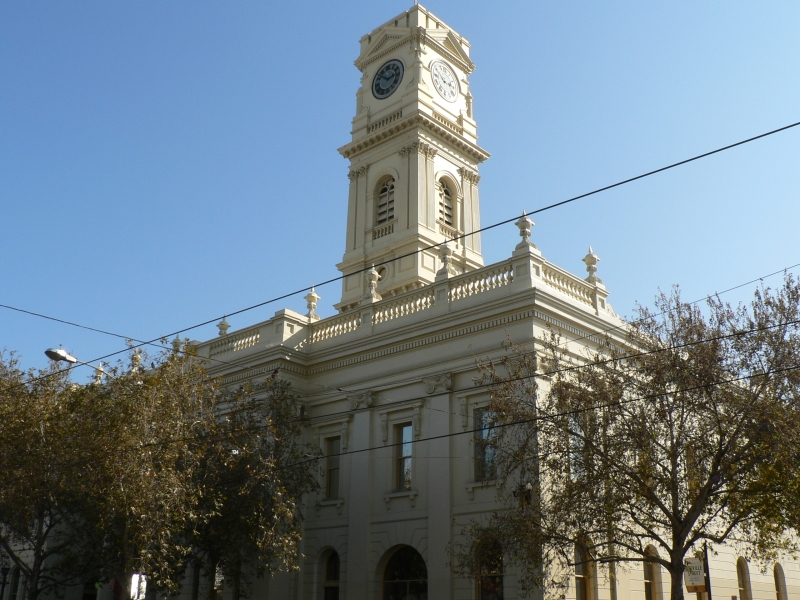
Prahran Town Hall

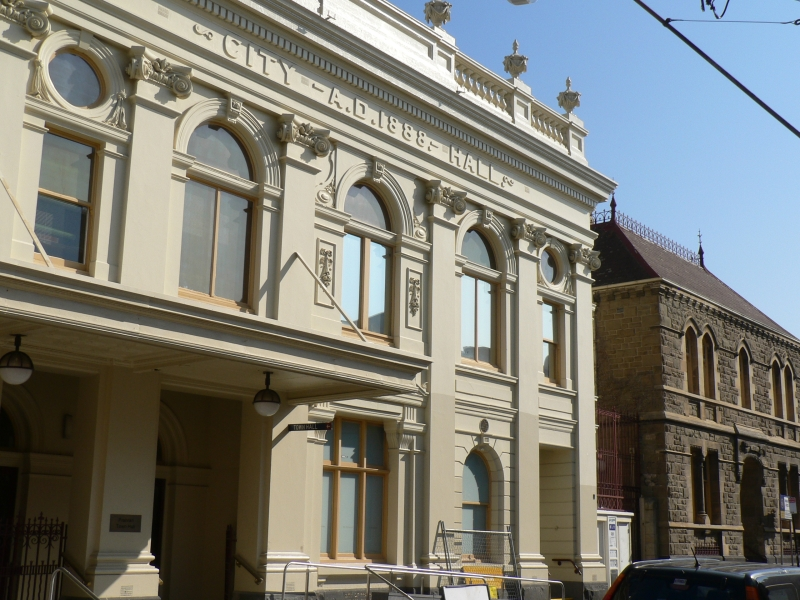
Prahran City Hall

In 1837 George Langhorne named the area Pur-ra-ran, which was thought to be a compound of two Aboriginal words, meaning "land partially surrounded by water". The word has more recently been identified as a transcription of "Birrarung", the name for the Yarra River or a specific point of it. When Langhorne informed the Surveyor-General Robert Hoddle of the name, it was written as "Prahran".

Prahran Post Office opened on 1 April 1853.

Describing Prahran, as it was in the mid 1850s, F. R. Chapman remembered:

In the very early times Chapel-street had many vacant spaces. On the west side, about the middle, a man could be seen ploughing his farm... and on the same side was a small brick church, or more probably a school-room used as a church, which was known as Mr Gregory's.

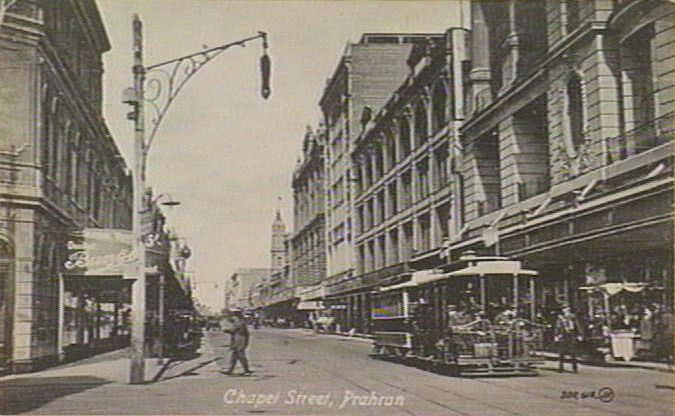
Chapel Street scene c. 1915. The large building second from the right between Read's Store and the Love & Lewis building was the Charles Moore and Co. department store (built 1903–1906 prior to the construction of Read's Emporium) which was demolished in the 1960s to make way for single storey carpark.

The Prahran Brotherhood (1910–1919) was a men-only pressure group aiming at raising the status of the district. Ostensibly non-sectarian but closely associated with the Congregational Church, it opposed gambling, wine bars opening on Sundays, and preference to unionists.

Between the 1890s and 1930s Prahran built up a huge shopping centre, which by the 1920s had rivalled the Melbourne Central Business District. Large emporiums (department stores) sprang up along Chapel Street. Prahran also became a major entertainment area. The Lyric theatre (also known as the fleahouse), built on the corner of Victoria Street in 1911, burnt down in the 1940s. The Royal was the second old theatre built. The Empress (also known as the flea palace), another popular theatre on Chapel Street, was destroyed by fire in 1971. The site was operated by the cut-price clothes and homewares chain Waltons for the next decade and was later developed into the Chapel Street Bazaar.

In the 1960s, in an effort to boost the slowly growing local population and inject new life into the suburb, the Victorian Government opened the Prahran Housing Commission estate, just off Chapel Street, together with a larger estate, located just north in South Yarra. Further complementing the high rise developments was a low density development between Bangs and Bendigo Streets.

In the 1970s, the suburb began to gentrify, with much of the remaining old housing stock being renovated and restored. The area had a substantial Greek population and many took advantage of the rise in property values during the 1980s, paving the way for further development and a subsequent shift in demographics.

During the 1990s, the population increased markedly, with demand for inner-city living fuelling a medium-density housing boom, which continues in the area, as part of the Melbourne 2030 planning policy. It was during the 1990s that solidification of the area's gay community occurred, with many gay and gay-friendly businesses, the last of these closing around 2012.

== Demographics ==
In the 2021 census, there were 12,203 people in Prahran. 63.5% of people were born in Australia. The next most common countries of birth were England 4.6%, New Zealand (3.2%), Greece (2.7%), China (1.5%) and India (1.4%). 75.5% of people spoke only English at home. Other languages spoken at home included Greek (4.9%), Mandarin (1.9%), Spanish (1.5%), Italian (0.9%) and French (0.8%). The most common responses for religion were No Religion (52.3%) and Catholic (14.7%).

== Local landmarks ==
=== Non-residential architecture ===
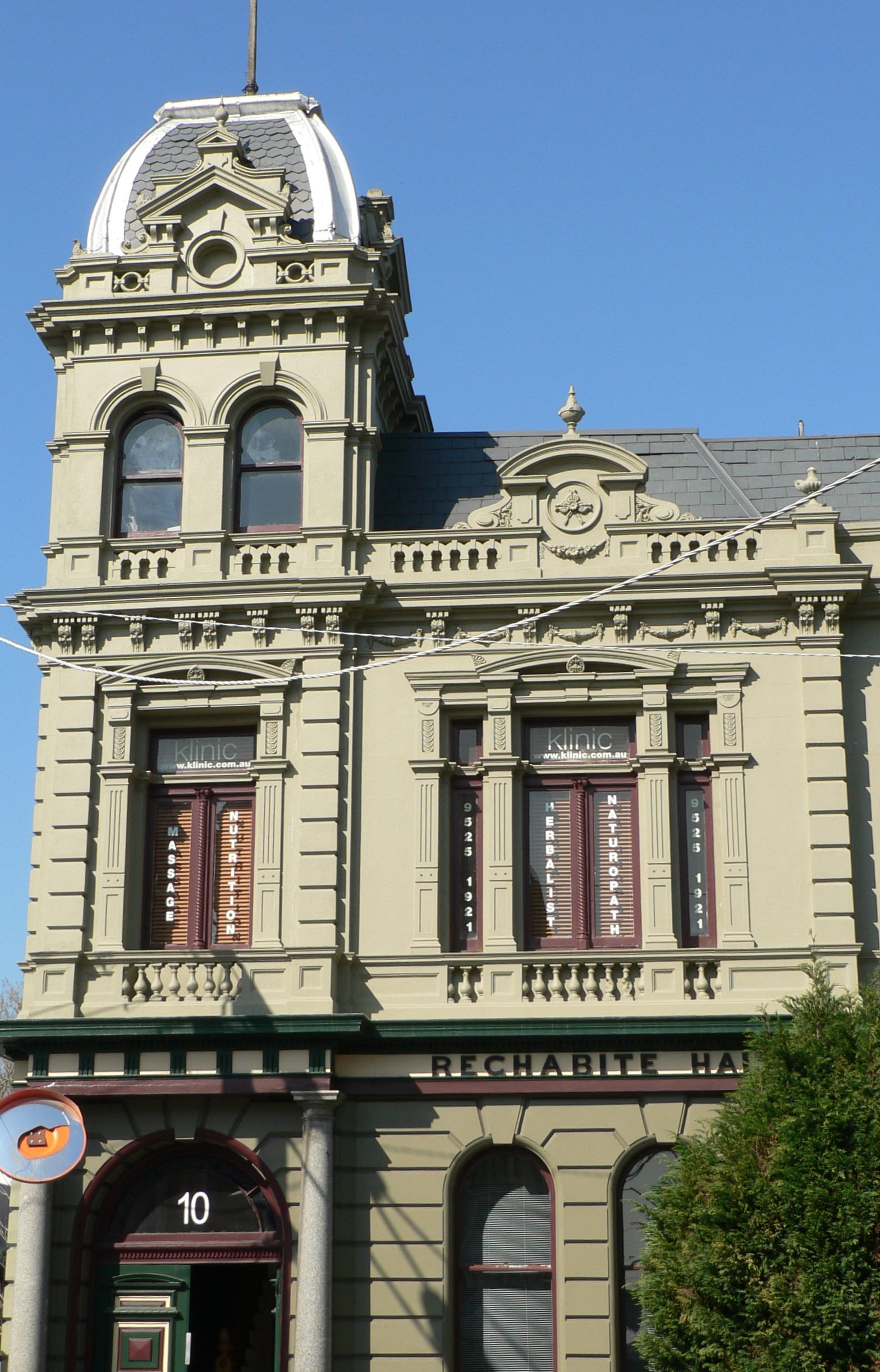
Prahran Rechabite Hall, part of the University of Melbourne

Prahran is home to a large collection of architecturally significant commercial buildings, with many on the Victorian Heritage Register.

The Chapel Street section of Prahran is notable for its collection of turn of the century emporiums and large buildings, which include:

- Prahran Arcade – Built in 1890 on Chapel Street, is a richly detailed building both externally and internally. Retains the original arcade, but the mansard roof was removed in the 1950s. Once known locally as "Birdland" due to pigeons which once bred in the recessed balconies of the building and the large eagles which adorn the facade. Was a Dan Murphy's for many years, then a JB HiFi store from c2000 to 2025. Heritage listed.
- Read's Stores – Built in 1914 on the corner of Chapel Street and Commercial Road by architectural firm Sydney Smith & Ogg. The heritage-listed building is a prominent example of large department stores which once lined the west side of Chapel Street up to High Street. Its twin beacons, which sit atop large copper clad domes, were once visible like lighthouses for miles around, but no longer operate. During the 1970s, the site traded as a department store under the name Moore's before the lower stories were converted into shops in the 1980s and named Pran Central. The upper stories were restored and converted into fashionable apartments in 2005.
- Big Store – Built in 1902 and closed in 1968 on Chapel Street. A second store, almost as large as the main store, once stood in the carpark to the west, beyond Cato Street, linked by cross-over walkways. This large Edwardian building is currently used by Coles Supermarkets.
- Maples Corner – Built in 1910 on the corner of Chapel and High Streets. Converted into offices in the 1980s and many deteriorating decorative features were replaced with post modern elements.
- Love & Lewis – Built in 1913 on Chapel Street and converted into a mix of offices, retail and apartments in 2004. Now heritage registered.

Other significant Prahran emporiums include Conway's Buildings (1914) and the large Colosseum building (1897), which was lost to fire in 1914.

Other heritage buildings include the former Prahran Town Hall (now vacant), the adjacent former City Hall (1888) (now unused), the neighbouring police station (1887) and court house (1887) and Rechabite Hall (1888), in the Second Empire style. The Prahran Fire Tower (1889) is on Macquarie Street. State School number 2855, formerly Prahran Primary School (1888), on High Street was converted into apartments in 2005. St Matthew's Church, a large bluestone church on High Street built in the 1880s, was partly converted into offices in the 1980s.

=== Residential architecture ===
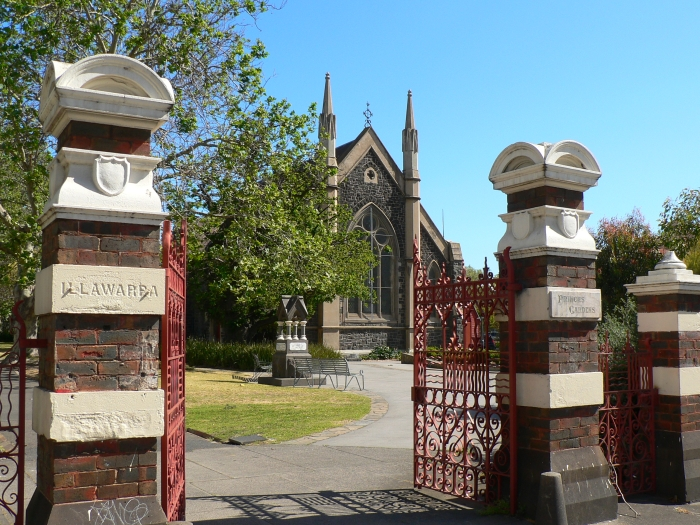
Gates to Princes Gardens

Residential Prahran consists of mostly single storey Victorian and Edwardian terrace houses, with some larger double storey terraces closer to the main shopping strips.

=== Public space ===
Prahran features many small, typically hidden gardens scattered throughout the suburb. The former Prahran Gardens, now "Grattan Gardens", are on the corner of Greville Street and Grattan Street and feature a playground and heritage bandstand. The Princes Gardens on Malvern Road, are a small garden, which features Chapel Off Chapel, an old church converted into a theatre, as well as the Prahran skate park. Victoria Gardens, on High Street, is a Victorian-era garden designed by landscape designer William Sangster in 1885. It features a sunken oval surrounded by London plane trees and a Victory bronze statue. The Orrong Romanis Reserve is the largest park in Prahran, although the Cato Street carpark has been converted into an urban square named Prahran Square.

== Education ==
Prahran was home to Prahran College, a secondary and tertiary technical college and trade school that originated in Chapel Street as, and continued to be associated with, the Prahran Mechanics' Institute. It incorporated an art school which particularly from around the 1960s produced graduates who went on to become significant Australians. From 1968 it was situated in a multi-storey building in High Street, demolished in 2017 for the construction by the Andrews government of a $25 million 'vertical' secondary college, next to Melbourne Polytechnic and the National Institute of Circus Arts, and which opened in 2019. Alumni include painters Howard Arkley, Douglas Baulch, Christopher Beaumont, Peter Churcher, William Dargie, Robert Jacks, William Kelly, David Larwill; printmakers Basil Hadley and Merris Hillard; Ceramicists Jennifer Brain; designers Mimmo Cozzolino and Martine Murray; photographers Robert Ashton, Andrew Chapman, Susan Fereday, Bill Henson, Carol Jerrems, Tony Maskill, Leonie Reisberg, Stephen Wickham and sculptor Stuart Devlin.

== Transport ==
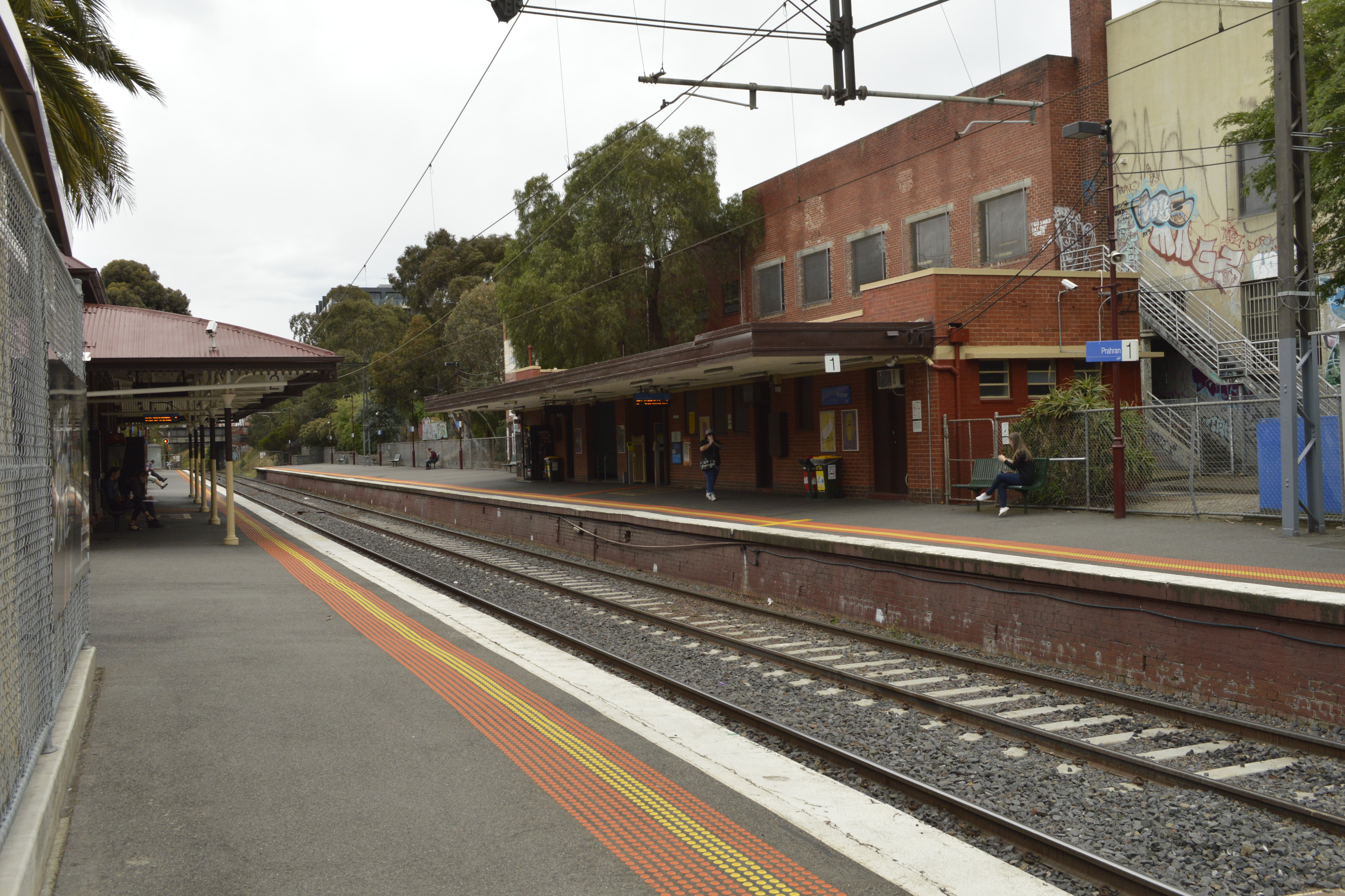
Prahran railway station

Prahran is serviced by Prahran station, on the Sandringham line, as well as trams routes 5, 6, 64, 72 and 78.

== Notable people ==
- Graham Berry – (1822–1904) Colonial politician, and 11th Premier of Victoria, was a grocer in Prahran in the 1850s.
- Maurice Blackburn – (1880–1944) Australian lawyer and Labor Party politician, who died in Prahran in 1944.
- Raelene Boyle – Australian athlete, who worked for the Prahran City Council as a landscape gardener.
- Keith Campbell, first Australian to win a Grand Prix motorcycle racing world championship in 1957.
- Barlow Carkeek – (1878–1937) Victorian and Australian cricketer died in Prahran in 1937.
- Walter Joseph Cawthorn – Soldier, diplomat and a former head of the Australian Secret Intelligence Service (ASIS) was born in Prahran in 1896.
- Percy Cerutty – Eccentric athletics coach of Herb Elliott was born in Prahran in 1895.
- Arthur Henry Cobby – Leading air ace in the Australian Flying Corps during World War I was born in Prahran.
- Paul Cox – film director who lived in Prahran and taught at Prahran College 1967–1980.
- John "Jack" Edwards – Test cricketer, was born in Prahran in 1860.
- Mark Evans (musician) – Bass guitarist with AC/DC from 1975 to 1977.
- Tony Gaze – WW2 fighter ace and first Australian racing driver to compete in an overseas Grand Prix, born in Prahran in 1920.
- Lisa Gerrard – Australian musician and singer, part of the music group Dead Can Dance, lived in Prahran.
- John Gorton − 19th Prime Minister of Australia
- Lachy Hulme – Australian actor and screenwriter, lives in Prahran.
- Herbert Hyland – (1884–1970) Investor and Country Party politician, was born on 15 March 1884 in Prahran.
- Sammy J – Musical Comedian
- Gertrude Johnson – (1894–1973) Soprano and founder of the National Theatre, born in Prahran in 1894.
- Enid Joske established the city's children's library
- Chris Judd – Former Carlton captain, has a luxury home in Prahran.
- George Hodges Knox – Australian politician, after whom the City of Knox is named, was born in Prahran in 1885.
- Sam Loxton – Australian Test cricketer, played for Prahran in Victorian Premier Cricket, later represented the area in the Victorian Legislative Assembly.
- Rebecca Maddern – ex Seven News presenter and now AFL Footy show co host.
- Dr. John Marden – (1855–1924) Headmaster, pioneer of women's education, and Presbyterian elder, was born in Prahran in 1855.
- Gillon McLachlan – Chief Executive Officer of Australian Football League.
- Paul Medhurst – Collingwood footballer, currently living in Prahran.
- John Safran – Documentarian and media personality.
- Lee Schraner – the 2019 lawn bowls World Singles Champion was born in Prahran in 1982
- Daryl Somers – television personality
- Sir John Armstrong Spicer –(1899–1978) Attorney-General in the Menzies government, was born in Prahran in 1899.
- Henry Tate – Poet and musician, was born in Prahran in 1873.
- Brian Taylor – Former Australian rules footballer and coach of Prahran Football Club in the VFA, present-day television commentator for Seven Network
- Eliza Taylor – Actress
- George Tolhurst – (1827–1877) English Australian Composer. Composed the first oratorio Ruth, in the Colony of Victoria and first performed in 1864 in Prahan.
- Keith William "Bluey" Truscott – World War II ace fighter pilot and Australian rules footballer, was born in Prahran in 1916.
- Harry Frederick Ernest "Fred" Whitlam – Crown Solicitor and father of Prime Minister Gough Whitlam was born in Prahran in 1884.
- Leanne Marie Whiteside - (1970-2001) Employee of Aon, victim of the September 11 attacks.

== See also ==
- City of Prahran – Prahran was previously within this former local government area.
- Electoral district of Prahran
- Prahran College (1864–1992), a late-secondary and tertiary institution with a trade school, business school, and a multi-disciplinary art school.
- Prahran Telegraph, local newspaper from 1860–1930s
