= Prahran College =

Art school in Melbourne closed 1992

Coordinates: 37.851651°S 144.991296°E

The Prahran College of Advanced Education, formerly Prahran College of Technology, was a late-secondary and tertiary institution with a business school and a trade school, best known for its multi-disciplinary art school that dated back to the 1860s, populated by instructors and students who were among Australia’s notable artists including Sidney Nolan and Polly Borland, designers like Mimmo Cozzolino and Linda Jackson, and performers, Joan Carden and Ethel Punshon among them.

After undergoing various mergers, splits and incarnations over the years, the Prahran entity ceased to exist from 1 January 1992, when an Act of Parliament brought Prahran College of TAFE under the auspices of Swinburne University of Technology. The tertiary art courses, Graphics and Industrial Design, remained on the campus. All others were moved to Deakin University, except Prahran Fine Art, which was relocated and amalgamated with the Victorian College of the Arts.

== History ==
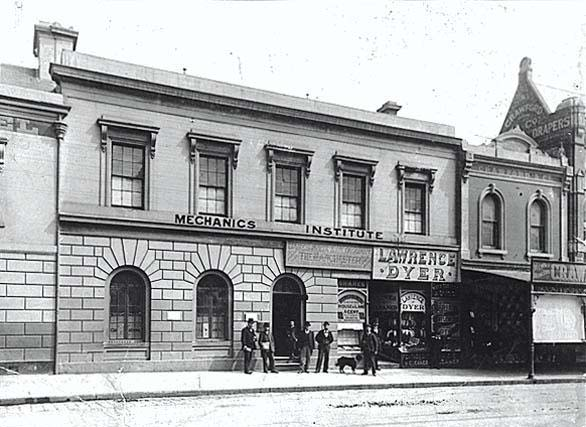
Prahran Mechanics' Institute 1856

The art school in Prahran grew from beginnings in the 1850s. The Prahran Mechanics' Institute was established in 1854 with part of its activities separating and being identified as Prahran Technical Art School in 1915. That was incorporated in the Prahran Technical School in 1950 with its tertiary and trade education becoming the Prahran College of Technology in 1967. This then became the Prahran College of Advanced Education in 1974. It offered a wide range of higher education and TAFE courses (later including degrees), with a focus on art and design. On 9 December 1981, the TAFE component was spun off as the Prahran College of TAFE.

=== Prahran Mechanics' Institute ===
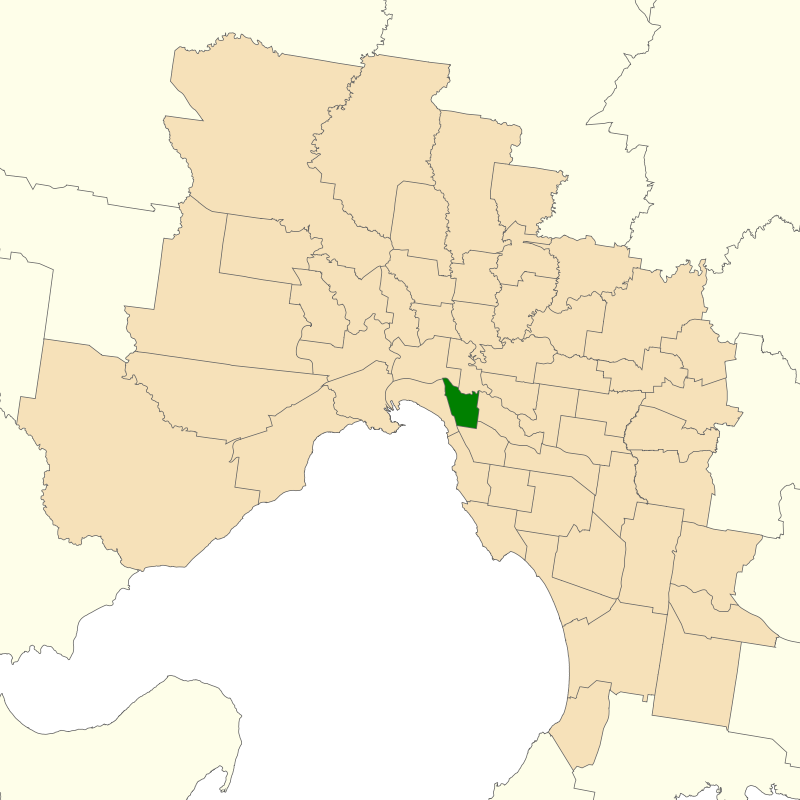
The Prahran District in 2014

In the 1850s what was an as yet unnamed district of Melbourne south of the Yarra River was occupied on its hills by large estates, an extant survivor being Como House, served by a population of around 8,000 workers in cottages set in often swampy, flood-prone lower-lying areas. A settlement along what is now High Street, Malvern Road and Chapel Street, became Prahran, and the minister of the chapel after which the street was named, Rev. William Moss, held public educational lectures for skilled tradesmen. A 1 May 1854 meeting he attended with other businessmen of the district resolved to establish a Prahran Mechanics’ Institute, and from a fund-raising campaign a dedicated building was constructed in Chapel Street and opened in December 1856.

Throughout the 1860s the Victorian government, seeking to improve industrial design, established schools of design for 'working men', and a School of Art and Design was set up in Prahran. By 1876 the emphasis had switched to preparatory classes for university entrance and for public examinations leading to employment in the Public Service. The institute closed for lack of funds during the 1890s depression, but Henry Furneaux in his appointment as secretary in 1900 re-established the institute, started to restore its membership and agitated for better accommodation for classes. He proposed to his committee of management the employment of Thomas Levick, part-time art teacher at the Working Men’s College (now RMIT) and previously at the Castlemaine School of Mines, and he was duly appointed from 1 July 1908.

=== Prahran Technical Art School ===
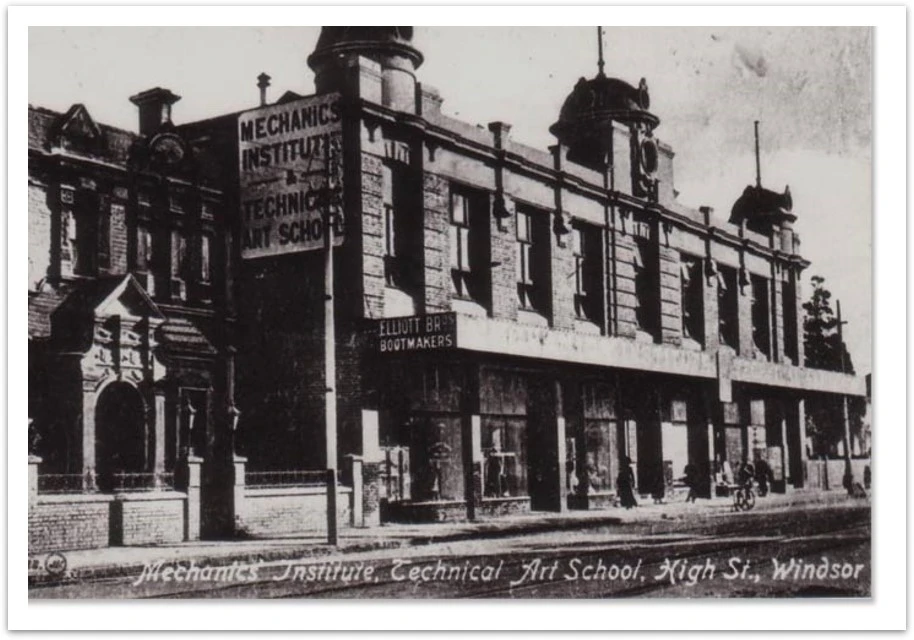
Postcard showing Prahran Mechanics Institute and Technical Art School

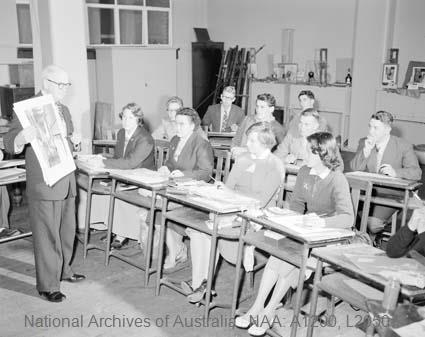
1950s Art class at Prahran Technical School, Melbourne, Victoria. National Archives of Australia

4 September 1909 brought Education Department recognition as a Prahran Technical Art School, but unlike for other such schools Prahran did not receive government maintenance grants and though by August 1911 the School had an enrolment of forty-eight, Furneaux was obliged to continue lobbying for a new building. When Levick resigned to take up a permanent position at the Melbourne college Furneaux strategically left the appointment of his replacement to the Education Department which on 6 February 1912, hired William R. Dean, a lithographer and commercial artist who had gone on to study at the National Gallery in London and was made Associate of the Royal College of Architecture. "Prahran Tech", combining secondary and tertiary schools, began in 1915 with costs shared largely by the Prahran Mechanics’ Institute and Prahran Council. In 1931 Dean, then inspector of art education in Victoria, continued to express favour for a generalist, rather than vocational, art education in saying that "originality should be encouraged and that Australian forms, feelings and colouring should be stressed as much as possible." Under his tutelage, enrolments increased.

=== Prahran Technical College ===
In 1960 Prahran offered diploma level Art & Design courses, which also attracted overseas enrolments. A new trade block was opened in 1961 on the corner of St John and Thomas Streets, with a second stage finished in 1963. Trade courses it housed were Fibrous Plastering, Cabinet-Making, French Polishing, and Upholstery. Evening courses were also provided in Cabinet-Making and Home Wood Craft; Shorthand; Typewriting; Dressmaking; Invalid Cookery; Ticket writing; Display; Millinery and Preparatory Apprentice Class.

=== Art school ===
The Committee on the Future of Tertiary Education in Australia was appointed on 27 August 1961 and via the Universities Commission reported to the Commonwealth Minister, Senator John Gorton. Willis Connolly heading the Victorian State Advisory Committee on Technical Education oversaw implementation of the recommendations of the Commission and created the Victorian Institute of Colleges (VIC) through an Act on 9 June 1965.

That year the senior part of the school had begun to call itself Prahran Technical College and Alan Warren, a graphic design teacher from RMIT School of Art replaced Duncan as Principal. Warren, Art critic on the Sun News Pictorial newspaper from 1951 to 1971 and member of the Contemporary Art Society, proved himself a vocationalist in contrast to Duncan, committed to running a ‘college’, rather than a ‘technical school’, which trained "creative designers, craftsmen and draughtsmen" but not "artists in a vacuum" and least of all, "oil painters." In teaching theory, knowledge of art forms, encapsulated by Roger Fry in Vision and Design (1926), was to be imparted but not "simply a History of Art".

Warren was an active publicist for the college; the school published a magazine, prahran, in 1962 and mounted an art display in the Port Phillip Arcade in the city, then from 1963 the art school produced a Bulletin written by Warren and his staff, then including drawing teacher Pam Hallandal; Mrs Nancy Moore (who in 1968 became head of the Graphics Department); Max Ripper, Instructor in Advertising Art; Robin Wallace-Crabbe, Instructor in General Art; Nan Ritter, Instructor in Drawing; John King, Instructor in Painting; Edgar Howell, Instructor in Instrumental Drawing; and J. Freivolt, Instructor in Craft.

Prahran was considered to be at the vanguard of design education, offering the first Diploma course major in photography in Australia. Enrolments then in the art school under Head of Art Frank Carter then comprised 80 secondary teachers in training who received £15 a fortnight from the Education Department, 30 Certificate of Art students and 200 part-time students. Art and Commerce Diploma courses were available in 1962 alongside Certificate programmes for Commerce, Accountancy and Certificate of Art.

== Prahran College of Technology ==
Prahran was affiliated with the Victoria Institute of Colleges in 1967, in its application emphasising the ‘School’s unique character…implicit in its foundation as a Technical Art School….retained throughout the ensuing half-century of operation,’ and stressing that in Victoria there was need ‘for a modern advanced Institute of Design, planned, staffed and equipped to train students for the Industrial Design, Visual Communications and the Film and Television Industries,’ and supported by a suggestion that Prahran art students would benefit from the 'intimate association with both Liberal Arts and Business Studies.' Its favourable position was backed up by the fact that the school had an established council that could become a new autonomous College council as suggested by VIC.

In order that the institute could officially become a College in line with Principal Alan Warren's ambitions, and affiliate with the Victoria Institute of Colleges, General Studies was included in the curriculum from May 1965. From that date the school was ‘Prahran College of Technology.’

The Prahran and District Parent-Teachers' Council and the Victorian Teachers' Union organised a meeting at the Prahran Town Hall on 12 May 1966 to protest conditions in local schools and carried a resolution calling on the State Government to apply the Health Act to State Schools. Cr Martin Smith, president of the Prahran Technical School Council, responded by showing the meeting plans for a new Arts and Commerce Block for the college, a multi-storeyed building which had been approved by the Education Department against a background of inaction since 1947 despite Union complaints since the 1930s of leaky Technical School roofs and ‘slum-like’ conditions.

=== A new building ===
The new building, of five storeys and a basement, was constructed during 1966 and 1967 at a cost of $1.5 million with $800,000 granted by the Commonwealth Government. It accommodated 350 students of the art section in thirty workshops, studios and lecture rooms. The 1967 Handbook detailed an overall ‘integrated’ program as preferable to it being divided into separate ‘channels’. Three-dimensional media including Industrial design, sculpture, ceramics, and stage design would share a core in Structure Studies, and graphic artists, illustrators, painters and photographers a common course of Image Studies, while "Communication Studies bring together film-makers, television and theatrical designers. Thus the old boundaries of Fine and Applied Art can be broken and a rich interchange of creative ideas can be stimulated."

This structure became the basis of Prahran’s well respected ‘Preliminary’ or ‘Foundation’ Year, headed by Gordon Leviston, which in 1970 included Liberal Studies: History of Arts 1, Matriculation English Expression; Design Studies: Image Design, Structure Design; Related Studies: Drawing, Technical Drawing, Lettering, and Rendering. Students could add extra subjects in Typing, Mathematics, Science and Chemistry.

This building was demolished fifty years later for the construction by the Andrews government of a 25 million 'vertical' secondary college, next to Melbourne Polytechnic and the National Institute of Circus Arts, and which opened in 2019.

=== Lenton Parr (1966–1969) ===
Sculptor Lenton Parr who was Head of Sculpture at RMIT (1964–66) was appointed Head of Art and Design in the building still being completed as he arrived. He appointed teachers who became influential in Australian art and was held in high esteem by staff, but his fine art philosophy clashed with the vocationally-oriented aims of Principal Warren, who acted unsuccessfully to have him removed by advertising his job, prompting an inquiry by the Minister. Though his appointment at Prahran was upheld, Parr left, effective 31 January 1969, to take up the role of Principal at the National Gallery School (1969-1974), leading to his appointment as director (1974–84) of the Victorian College of the Arts when it replaced the Gallery School

Warren’s appointments of end-of-career advertising industry men were unpopular with his staff and there was unrest amongst students, which against the background of the government inquiry into the governance of the college and resignations of 16 staff, culminated in a ‘work-in’ in June and July 1969 in the Prahran Town Hall which was reported in the newspapers of 31 July.

=== Secondary school ===
The tertiary section of the school joining the Victorian Institute of Colleges did not automatically split Prahran Tech into College, School and Trade sections, so 'separation' of secondary education, still housed in the institution, from the tertiary, had to be considered. In particular, during 1970 there was discussion about moving the boys out of the premises behind the High Street building in part due to objections to their behaviour from female art students, and the Mechanics Institute was agitating to resume its buildings. In 1958 junior girls’ Prahran Technical School classes had been moved to Hornby Street, Windsor. The Schools' Board on 4 November 1970 adopted the 'Organizational Structure of Prahran Technical School' plan under which Warren would continue as Principal, Kate McKemmish as Vice-Principal in charge of a co-ed school at Hornby Street and Keane as Vice-Principal of St John St trades studies until separation. The junior Tech School was later merged with Windsor Technical School, Prahran High School and Ardoch Windsor High school. Even when split up, the school’s four parts — the senior Prahran Technical College, Prahran junior Technical School (Boys), Prahran Junior Technical School (Girls) and the trade schools — still referred to themselves as ‘Prahran Tech’, until reconfigured as Prahran Secondary College then closed in the 1980s.

== A transition ==
As a response to the government review, Art and Design, Business Studies and Liberal Studies Boards reporting to the Administrative and Academic Boards were appointed, all with student representation, to oversee the governance of the new institution alongside Staffing, Finance and Building and Maintenance Committees. In February 1970, College Vice-Principal Myer Mirsky announced that the college program would switch to semesters instead of terms that year, the second only such institution to do so after Canberra College of Advanced Education. He identified benefits especially for working business students undertaking part-time diplomas, and the establishment of 'sandwich courses'.

Mid-stream course changes at the beginning of 1971 were prompted when Prahran's new courses in photography, cinematography, film production and the proposed course in television production were found not to have been approved by the VIC; Warren had mistakenly assumed outside approval was not necessary. A compromise allowed Prahran to submit their Product Design, Fashion Design, Cinematography and Ceramics courses for acceptance but Photography and Print Making remained unapproved. Having realised his ten-year ambition for a ‘College’ but as a consequence of Council, staff and student disenchantment for which he had lately been the cause, and after having his position reclassified and advertised, Warren resigned at the end of 1971.

Head of Business and Acting Deputy Principal, Myer Mirsky, who became Acting Principal on 24 January 1972, initially applied for the position of Principal, but withdrew his application in April.

His successor was Dr. David Armstrong (1941–2006), born in Coonabarabran, who came from Humber College, Toronto, where he was Dean of Creative and Communication Arts, and who was reported as being then, at 30 years of age, the youngest head of a tertiary institution in Australia. In his first ten weeks, he removed eight staff, some of whom were hired by Warren, and appointed Victor Majzner, sculptor John Davis, and photographer Athol Shmith. Other lecturers in 1971 included film-maker Paul Cox, painters Jeffrey Makin and Sandra Leveson, Pam Hallandal who had been at the school since 1958, Tim Moorhead, John Howley, Caroline May, Industrial Designer Edmond Worsley who was Head of Art in 1971, and Gordon Leviston, at the school since 1950, who was Head of Preliminary Studies which was also being restructured by Armstrong. Per annum salaries were; Head of Department: $11,521; Senior Lecturer: $9,644-$10,810; Lecturer: $6,801-$9,390; and Assistant Lecturer: $4,569-$7,236.

With the increasing importance of the computer and data processing, the other Prahran School, Business, was well positioned. Equipped with $46,500 of new equipment, Business students were streamed into Accounting and Data Processing from a general first year course, in whom all took Matriculation English Expression, Social Studies, Economic History, Business Mathematics and Finite Mathematics, with semester-based subjects available on a part-time basis so that students could be working while studying, often taking eight years to complete a Diploma of Business. Insurance Studies was added in 1972, the first such course in Victoria.

In 1972 the VIC forewarned of budget cuts to come in the next 3 years and that the Business Studies Building would be merely refurbished instead of replaced. No other expansion would be funded, though purchase of properties at 43 and 53 Green Street already underway proceeded, and the Education Department acquired a block at 43 St John Street for $11,250.51. The Fashion Design course, with high demands on space and whose staff qualifications did not meet VIC requirements, was sacrificed to the budget cuts, and to some predominating male prejudice.

== Prahran College of Advanced Education ==
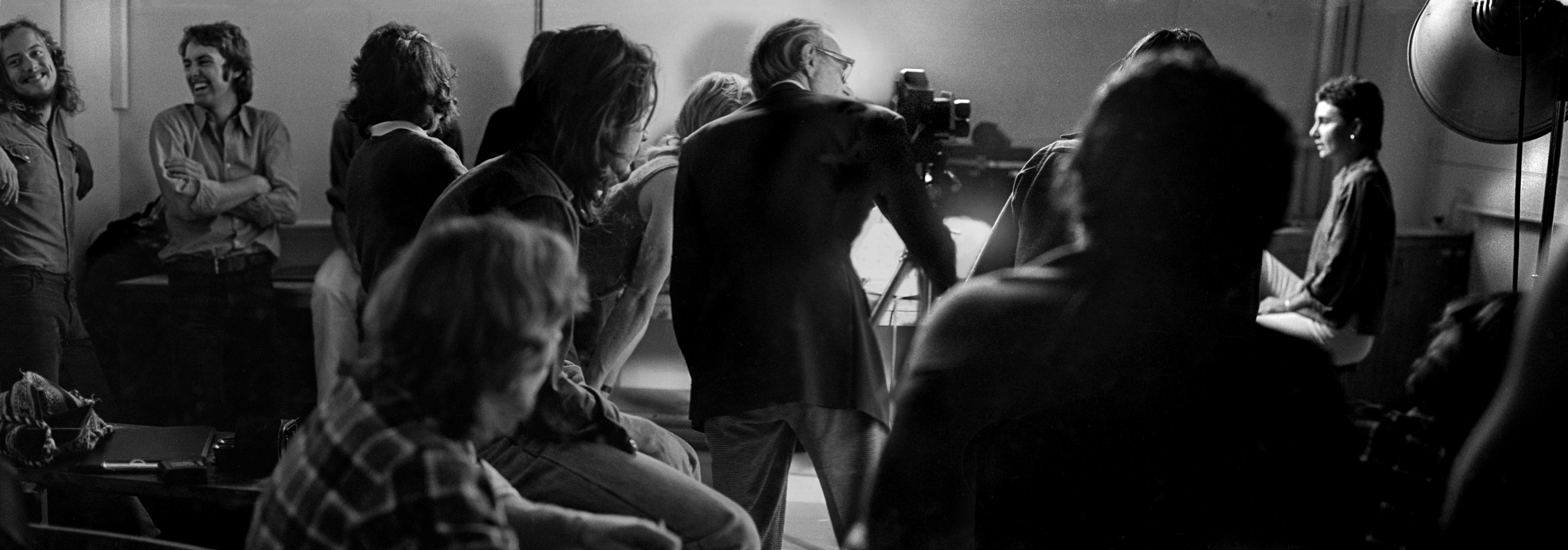
Athol Shmith lecturing at Prahran College of Advanced Education in 1975

After 54 years as a council-controlled school funded by the Education Department, Prahran Technical School ceased to exist in June 1970 when it became part of the Victorian Institute of Colleges and on 21 February 1973 took a new name; Prahran College of Advanced Education.

It emerged into a period of societal and political change, with the end in 1972 of Australia's involvement in the Vietnam War and of conscription, into emerging socialist perspectives on civil rights and the women's liberation movement which swept a Federal Labor government, led by Gough Whitlam, into power after 20 years of conservative rule, which in 1974 abolished fees for universities and colleges of advanced education, opening up educational opportunities previously denied the underprivileged.

In 1977 the college offered its first degree, a Bachelor of Business (Accounting), and in March 1978 the School of Art and Design applied unsuccessfully to the VIC to offer courses leading to a Bachelor of Arts (Interdisciplinary - Art and Design).

=== A 'community college' ===
Armstrong’s interest in community colleges and his ambition to develop a multi-campus institution offering non-tertiary, part-time study advanced its activities outside the Diploma courses, and establishment of adult education for early school leavers and women especially. He positioned Prahran as a 'comprehensive community college’, ‘small and human’ running a with student-centred program that sidestepped status distinctions in tertiary education. Though his changes were not universally popular due to unease by some about their ‘dumbing down’ the college, and though he often clashed with VIC, he was generally respected.

The college presented a week-long programme for International Women's Day, and its A to Z Guide to Student Services offered advice and information on a range of issues pertinent to the 1970s student, including finding housing and part-time work, abortion and child care, the latter provided in 1977 by Jean McLean and the Women's Action Group at Prahran Tech and later the College Union in the country’s first education institution childcare centre. McLean, with Judi Kiraly organised a seminar on 'surviving as artists' in 1976. Women's Studies was offered as a unit of study in the Tertiary Orientation Programme. In addition the college provided cheap student accommodation, offered cheap health insurance and ran a Medical Centre, assisted in financing exhibitions at the Art & Design Building Gallery, and also ran a number of short courses.

In a 1979 interview Community Programs Director Judi Kiraly represented Prahran's stance on anti-elitist community and adult education in saying that for too long tertiary institutions had felt they served only the cream of the adult learning population;

"There is no educational reason why colleges and universities cannot maintain the highest standards of academic excellence and at the same time make room ... for the less academically inclined, or for those who want short, more adaptable programs", she said.

=== Technical and Further Education ===
The TAFE (Technical and Further Education) system was created in 1975 by an Act of Parliament and governed by the Victorian Education Department, a separate program from that of Prahran College of Advanced Education as governed by the Victorian Institute of Colleges. It proved a boon for Prahran in providing a purpose for components of courses split from the Technical College after its dissolution, and in establishing a junior and senior college system with strong ties to the local community, integral to, and providing pathways into, the college and thus served Armstrong's ambitions. Dr Colin Woodrow was appointed assistant director, TAFE in 1975, overseeing all of its courses, which included, in 1976, Certificate of Business Studies, Childcare Studies, Library Studies, Certificate of Applied Art and a Trade School with divisions in Furniture and Fibrous Plastering. Tertiary Orientation Year in General Studies was an equivalent to today’s Victorian Higher School Certificate, was an entry qualification into PCAE and some other institutions.

=== Foundation Year and Extension courses ===
The Prahran Art Foundation Year was administered by TAFE, and Adult Extension Courses were also important entry pathways into the college. 1976 subjects included Basic Photography, Basic Pottery, Representational Painting, Life Drawing, Intermediate Painting, Jewellery and Silver Craft, Weaving and Textile Art, General Sculpture, Technical illustration, Graphics and Design, Printmaking, Airbrush Techniques, Intermediate Photography, Intermediate Ceramics alongside Furniture Studies, Mandarin Chinese, Modern Greek, Indonesian, Hebrew and Yiddish, as well as Business Studies subjects like Small Business, Financial Management, Accounting and Book-keeping, Business Law, Customer Relations and Social Science subjects.

In 1977 Prahran College Extension tutors in drawing and painting included Howard Arkley, Elizabeth Gower and Stephen May; Prahran graduate Betty Knight in sculpture; Ann Learmonth ran a weaving and knotting class; Cheryl Small, another Prahran graduate, offered ceramics. Peter Schmedig tutored in Art History and Appreciation; and Alan Money, Head of Drama, ran a Theatre Workshop while playwright Simon Hopkinson ran a course called The Writer's Craft.

From 1976-1978 the General Studies Department produced an annual literary magazine Biala edited by staff member Julian Citizen and Melbourne playwright and author, publisher and bookseller John Powers. Staff agreed that community courses led to increased enrolments in the diploma; Prahran graduates Euan McGillivray, Warren Townsend and Maurice Hambur taught Photography and as John Cato noted in 1981, the community program generated more than a third of the 1981 intake for photography and provided training for staff who might eventually be employed by the college.

=== The 1980s ===
Dr Colin Campbell replaced Armstrong in July 1980 and took forward to the VIC proposals for Bachelors of Arts in Fine Art in Ceramics and Photography and in Indonesian Language and Culture; Bachelors Degrees in Business (Personnel Administration, and Credit Management); and a Postgraduate Diploma in Corporate Risk Management, for the 1982-84 triennium. However Campbell was left a financial mess, with the College Union in deficit. The student newspaper Flash editorial in its last 1980 edition condemned the budget management and noted that "The Prahran School of General Studies was hustled off to S.C.V [Victoria College] Toorak halfway through the academic year, while the School's Dean did a moonlight flit - literally."

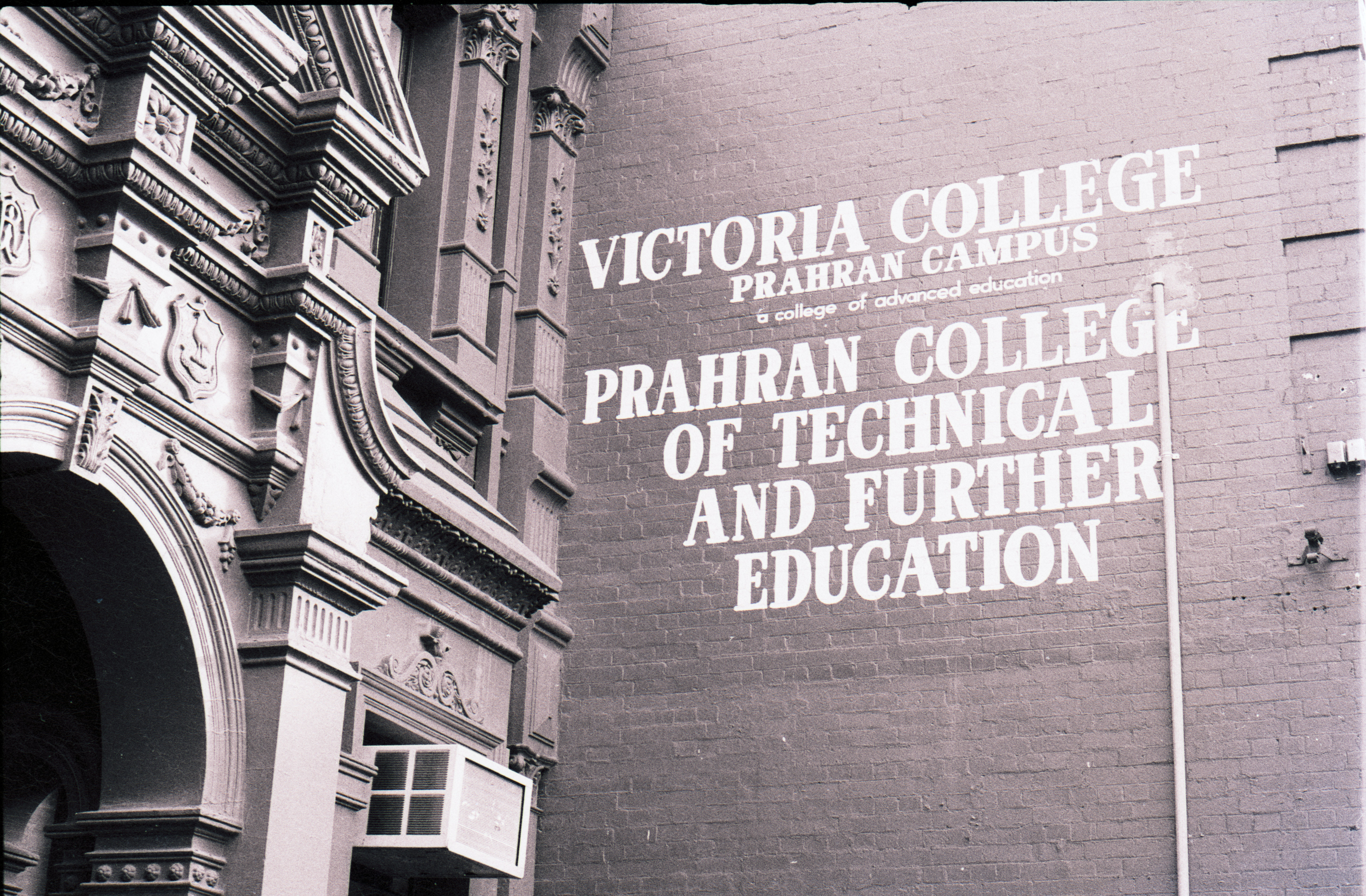
1989 - Victoria College Prahran campus - Prahran College of Technical and Further Education

On 23 December 1981 Prahran College of Advanced Education split from Prahran College of TAFE and was merged with State College of Victoria teachers’ colleges at Burwood, Rusden and Toorak to create Victoria College across five campuses. Prahran continued to develop and offer new courses and at the time had 767 full-time and 1192 part-time TAFE students, and 1350 in higher education, taught by 125 academic and 121 general staff and a budget of $5,097,000.

For 1983 the Prahran campus had received the lowest funds per student of the 17 tertiary colleges/institutes in Victoria prompting a student deputation to the Labor government in Canberra. Business Studies suffered a loss of two-thirds of its program to another campus when Accounting and Data Processing was transferred to Burwood.

== Merger and demise ==
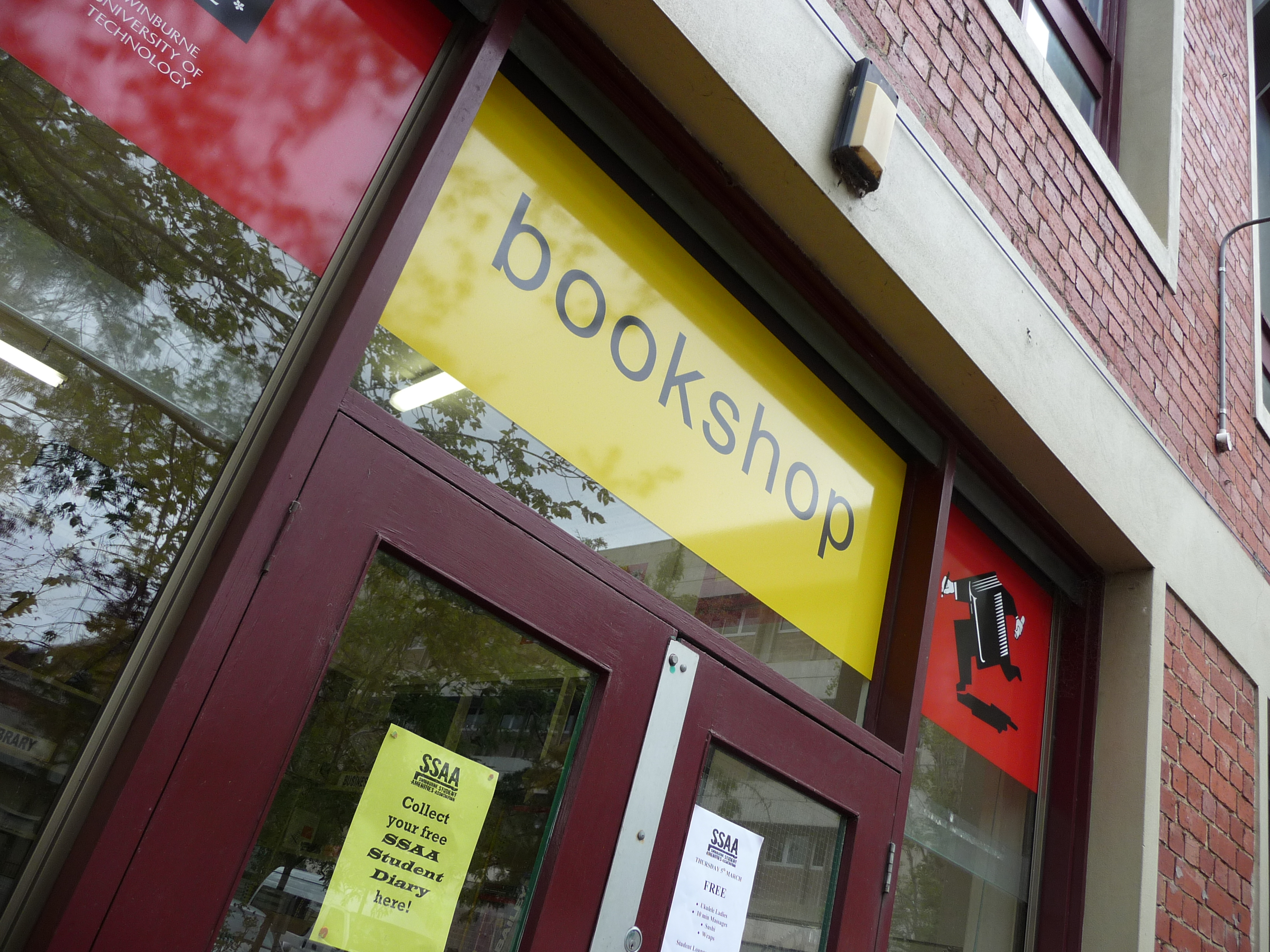
Bookshop, Swinburne University of Technology, Prahran in 2009

The Prahran entity ceased to be from 1 January 1992 when an Act of Parliament brought Victoria College's Prahran Campus and Prahran College of TAFE under the auspices of Swinburne University of Technology, with the only tertiary courses, Graphics and Industrial Design, remaining on the campus, while the Furniture Studies department of Prahran TAFE moved to Holmesglen Institute in 1992. All others were moved to Deakin University except Prahran Fine Art under Gareth Sansom which was relocated and amalgamated with the Victorian College of the Arts, where the next Dean of Art was William Kelly.

As the VCA was not split into departments, it was the Prahran heads who were given the role in several cases, with Pam Hallandal becoming Head of Drawing (then retiring at the end of 1993), Head of Ceramics was Greg Wain, previously Head of Ceramics at Prahran, and Victor Majzner likewise became Head of Painting at the VCA. Prahran Graduate, Christopher Köller was head of their new department of Photography. Printmaking was a separate Department at VCA before the merger and its Head was a Prahran graduate, Allan Mitelman, who was replaced by John Scurry, Head of Printmaking at Prahran. Jock Clutterbuck (VCA) and David Wilson (Prahran) alternated the role of head of the newly merged Department of Sculpture.

== Legacy ==
Sculptor and Prahran lecturer David Wilson, who began teaching part-time in the Sculpture Department under head John Davis in 1973, remembers;

"It was with great sadness that I left the Prahran sculpture studios at the close of 1992. I foresaw the end of the heady days of creative initiatives, of working within a system with a degree of autonomy for an administration which trusted that the decisions we made were always in the interests of better educating aspiring artists. By this time this enterprising culture was already being swamped by creeping regulation and "universification" and was replaced with stringency and accountability and justification and the imposition of a strange requirement of orthodoxy on the humanities. The last years of my teaching career bore this out. However I am lucky to have spent most of my art school life in an atmosphere where the college was seen as an extension of one's studio and a proper part of the art world at large."

== Alumni ==
The alumni of Prahran College, in its identities as Prahran College of Technology and Prahran College of Advanced Education and its predecessors, include its teaching staff...

- Howard Arkley 1977, 1980–85
- Norman Baggely 1980–91
- Richard Beck 1970–72
- Peter Booth 1967–68
- John Cato 1974–91
- Rowena Clark
- Tony Clark
- Fred Cress 1969–74
- William Dargie 1928-9, 1950s
- John Davis 1973–80
- Gordon De Lisle 1970–71
- Stuart Devlin 1963–4
- Lesley Dumbrell c1980
- Helen Geier 1974–80
- Pam Hallendal 1958–91
- Eleanor Hart 1986–88
- John Howley 1969–72
- Robert Jacks 1984–88
- Roger Kemp 1976–78
- Alun Leach-Jones c.1968
- Sandra Leveson 1972–1982
- Victor Majzner 1973–1991
- Jeffrey Makin 1971–82
- Caroline May 1969–90
- Daniel Moynihan 1973–77
- Gerald Murnane 1980-1995
- Adrian Officer c.1959
- Lenton Parr 1966–68
- Mary-Lou Pittard
- Athol Shmith 1971–79
- David Tolley 1965–
- Alan Warren 1961–71
- Greg Wain c.1990
- David Wilson 1967–71

...and its past students include:

=== Ceramicists ===
- Jennifer Brain (1988)
- Adriana Christianson
- Gordon Hickmott (1980)
- Fiona Murphy (1980)
- Cheryl Small

=== Multimedia artists ===
- Kate Ellis (1990–95)

=== Painters ===
- Howard Arkley
- Douglas Baulch
- Christopher Beaumont
- Stephen Birch
- Peter Churcher
- Gary Christian (1977–79)
- Peter Clarke (1951–52)
- William Dargie
- Judy Drew
- Bern Emmerichs
- Merrin Eirth (1977–79)
- Sarah Faulkner (1980–1982)
- Pasquale Giardino (1981–82)
- Elizabeth Gower
- Peter Sebastian Graham
- Donald Grant
- Mark Howson (1980)
- Nick Howson (1986)
- Philip Hunter (1979)
- Noela Hjorth
- Robert Jacks(1958–60)
- Elizabeth Jess (McCarthy)
- Angus Jones (1980–81)
- William Kelly
- Adrian Kerfoot
- David Larwill (1975)
- Dale Leach
- Jordan Marani
- Gabrielle Martin
- Andrew McLean (1964–7)
- Allan Mitelman
- Kevin Mortenson
- Josephine Muntz Adams
- Sidney Nolan
- Jim Paterson
- Laurence Peterson (1963–64)
- Ethel (Monte) Punshon
- John Scurry
- Richard Siemens (1974)
- Jonathan Summers
- Jim Tunks
- Ernest Vogel

=== Printmakers ===
- Basil Hadley
- Merris Hillard
- Noela Hjorth (1958–60)
- Franz Kempf (1942)
- Margaret Lees (1954–1955)
- Graham McKenzie
- Allan Mitelman (1965–68)
- Mali Moir
- Nicholas Nedelkopoulos
- Thornton Walker

=== Designers ===
- Con Aslanis
- Mimmo Cozzolino
- Geoff Cook
- Trevor Flett
- Stephen Holmes
- Basil Kardasis
- Izi Marmur
- Maree Menzel
- Martine Murray

=== Fashion designers ===
- Linda Jackson (1968)

=== Filmmakers ===
- Jaems Grant
- Gaetano "Nino" Martinetti
- Nicholas Nedelkopoulos
- Paddy (Patrick) Reardon

=== Photographers ===
The Photography department, especially under the direction of Athol Smith, and then John Cato, is recognised as a major influence on the medium in Australia through the 1970s and 80s, as historian, founder and Director of the Centre for Contemporary Photography and Director of the Australian Centre for Photography, Deborah Ely notes;

"By 1971 Athol Shmith had become Head of Photography at Prahran College, and was succeeded in this role nine years later by John Cato. The college was to become the breeding ground for a new generation of young photographers and the focus for much of the Melbourne photography scene. Shmith and his fellow teacher, the photographer and film-maker Paul Cox, fostered photography within an interdisciplinary context. Film, music and philosophy were some of the subjects interwoven into what was often accused of being an undisciplined photographic education. However, from the early 1970s onwards, the department produced some of the country's most acclaimed practitioners, including Bill Henson, Carol Jerrems, Steve Lojewski, Rozalind Drummond, Janina Green and Christopher Koller among others."

- Colin Abbott
- Robert Ashton
- Ross Bird
- Polly Borland
- John Brash
- Jason Busch
- Nanette Carter
- Andrew Chapman
- Peter Clarke (1986–9)
- Robert Colvin (1979–80)
- Kim Corbel
- Michael Cullin (1971–73)
- Christina de Water
- Rozalind Drummond
- Robert Earp
- Susan Fereday
- Duncan Frost
- Sandra Graham (1974–76)
- Janina Green
- Gerard Groeneveld (1975–77)
- Luzio Grossi (1986–89)
- Brendan Hennessy
- Bill Henson
- Naomi Herzog
- Julie Higginbotham
- Ian Hill (1986–88)
- Dominic Hsieh
- Clive Hutchinson (1971–74)
- Philip Ingamells (1970-72)
- Carol Jerrems (1967–70)
- Moira Joseph (1974–77)
- Peter Kelly (1973–76)
- Christopher Köller
- Johann Krix (1970–72)
- Paul Lambeth (1975–77)
- Peter Leiss
- Carolyn Lewens (1977–80)
- Steven Lojewski (1974–76)
- Tony Maskill
- Jenni Mather (1971, 1978)
- Jim McFarlane
- Euan McGillivray
- Larry Meltzer (1970–73)
- Richard Muggleton (1968–70)
- Martin Munz (1978–80)
- Matthew Nickson
- Rod McNicol
- Peter Milne
- Jacqueline Mitelman
- Glen O’Malley
- Ewa Narkiewicz
- Greg Neville (1971–72)
- Glen O'Malley (1973)
- Philip Quirk
- Leonie Reisberg
- Michael Sankey
- Geoff Strong
- Paul Torcello, advertising photographer
- Stephen Wickham
- Andrew Wittner
- Lynette Zeeng

=== Sculptors ===
- Roger Butler
- Stuart Devlin
- Stanley Hammond
- Merle Hathaway
- Curtis Hore
- Fiona Orr (1972–75)
- Ian Parry (c.1970s)
- Jim Paterson
- Anne Ross
- David Tolley
- Andrew Wright-Smith

== Bibliography ==
The most comprehensive history of Prahran College remains Buckrich, Judith Raphael; Prahran Mechanics' Institute (2007), Design for living: a history of 'Prahran Tech', Prahran Mechanics' Institute Press, pp. 96–99, ISBN 978-0-9756000-8-5 written under the auspices of Prahran Mechanics' Institute. Amongst the following are some cited in that book:

- Victoria. Education Department; Blake, L.J (1973), Vision and realisation. Volume 1: a centenary history of state education in Victoria, Education Dept. of Victoria, ISBN 978-0-7241-0458-1
- Bowen, Ruth; Australia. Department of Immigration, Local Government and Ethnic Affairs; Prahran College of TAFE (1991), Steps to success: improving the participation of people of non-English speaking background at Prahran College of TAFE, Prahran College of TAFE
- Briscoe, Graham; Prahran College of Advanced Education; Caulfield Institute of Technology (1979), Continuity and change in post-secondary education: proceedings, of the joint Prahran College of Advanced Education - Caulfield Institute of Technology Conference ... held at Prahran College of Advanced Education, November 29, 30, December 1, 1978, Prahran College of Advanced Education
- Candy, Philip C.; Laurent, John (1994), Pioneering culture: mechanics' institutes and schools of art in Australia, Auslib Press, ISBN 978-1-875145-25-6
- Cooper, John Butler (1924), The history of Prahran: from its first settlement to a city (2nd ed.), Modern Printing Co
- Jerrems, Carol (1974), Fraser, Virginia (ed.), A book about Australian women, Outback Press, ISBN 978-0-86888-007-5
- Jennings, Sonia; Barnard, Jill; City of Boroondara Library Service (2002), Telling lives: locating and mapping the cultural heritage of Boroondara, City of Boroondara Library Service, ISBN 978-0-9580874-0-7
- Meerkin, Cyla; Monash University (1980), Prahran College of Advanced Education: college, structure, dilemma and social problems, [Melbourne] Monash University
- McCalman, L. B; Prahran Historical and Arts Society; Prahran Mechanics' Institute (1983), Pioneer and hardy survivor: the Prahran "Mechanics" since 1854, Prahran Historical and Arts Society
- Museum of Australian Photography (2025). The Basement: Photography from Prahran College (1968–1981). Melbourne: Museum of Australian Photography. ISBN 9781876764883.
- Nazzari, Michael J (1976), An examination of the history of Prahran College of Advanced Education (the Prahran Technical Art School) as reflected through Council Minutes, 1915-1945, [Prahran, Vic] M. Nazzari
- Prahran College of TAFE (1991), Prahran College of TAFE study: growth, equity profile, marketing plan, staff vision for the future, [Prahran, Vic. The College]
- Ward, Simpson (1982), Draft educational strategy: Prahran College of TAFE, Burwood, [Vic.] Ward Simpson
- Wilde, Sally (1993). The history of Prahran / Volume II 1925-1990 (2nd ed.). Carlton, Victoria: Melbourne University Press. ISBN 9780522845877.
- Wilson, David; Majzner, Victor (1985), Painting and sculpture: Victoria College Prahran painting and sculpture graduate show, Victoria College
- Wilson, Valda (1981), Prahran College prognosis precarious
- Victoria. TAFE Board. Effectiveness Review Branch (1986), Organisation review Prahran College of TAFE, Melbourne TAFE Board, ISBN 978-0-7241-2775-7
- The possible origins of Prahran College, University of Melbourne, 1974
