= House and Garden Western Suburbs, Melbourne =

1988 painting by Howard Arkley

- Artist: Howard Arkley
- Year: 1988
- Medium: synthetic polymer paint on canvas
- Dimensions: 174.7 cm × 400.0 cm (68.8 in × 157.5 in)
- Location: National Gallery of Australia, Canberra
- Website: https://artsearch.nga.gov.au/detail.cfm?irn=16097

House and Garden Western Suburbs, Melbourne is a 1988 painting by Australian artist Howard Arkley. The diptych depicts a house typical of those in suburban Melbourne, reflecting Arkley's interest in Australian suburbia. The source was a real estate advertisement showing a house in Deer Park, an outer western suburb of Melbourne.

Although the image is familiar and cheerful, almost like an advertisement in a real estate magazine, there is something alienating and isolated about the obsessive neatness, lack of human figures and the shadowy windows.

— National Gallery of Australia,

The painting is part of the collection of the National Gallery of Australia in Canberra, purchased directly from the artist in 1988.
