= Jacqueline Mitelman =

Australian photographer

- Born: Jacqueline MacGreggor; 1948 (age 77–78); Scotland
- Known for: Photography

Jacqueline Mitelman is an Australian portrait photographer.

== Early life and education ==
Jacqueline Mitelman was born Jacqueline MacGreggor in Scotland in 1948, and has since lived in Melbourne and in France for a few years. She was briefly married to Polish emigrant the painter/printmaker Allan Mitelman. She studied for a Diploma of Art and Design at Prahran College of Advanced Education 1973–76, where her lecturers were Athol Shmith, Paul Cox, and John Cato.

== Career ==
After graduation, Mitelman practiced as a freelance photographer specialising in portraiture for magazines including the trendsetting POL, and newspapers, album and book covers, and for theatre and music posters. During her career she has sought out Australia's significant writers, artists and personalities for her subjects, thus creating a valuable pantheon of the country's culture.

One hundred and twenty appear in her 1988 book Faces of Australia was work previously exhibited at The Art Gallery, Prahran, to a lukewarm review from Age reviewer Greg Neville who while conceding that they were "professional and respectable," considered them "commercial portraiture in the sixties style, all grain and contrast, dressed up with just the right dose of Bicentenary sentiment," work that "tells us no more about the famed sitters than we already know, and nothing about the artist. Tom Fantl prefaced his review of the book with the statement that in portraiture "the surface physical features are descriptive but not all telling. It is the personality and psyche which the creative artist must explore, capture and relate. It is the inherent character which the viewer is urged to see, thereby seemingly establishing an understanding, almost a relationship, with the individual portrayed."

He concludes that;

Mitelman's approach is classical and explorative. Classically her sitters look directly into the camera lens, and hence at us, (eg Harry Siedler), thereby drawing us into their space and time. By carefully positioning her subjects, yet making them appear spontaneous we feel watched even as we do the watching.

Terry Lane, with the arrival of the internet nevertheless questions the value of such 'coffee-table' books as Mitelman's, even in the prior age of television, other than as 'time capsules'; "No one ever looks at it, which is a pity because I am in it."

The National Portrait Gallery holds twenty of her photographs including those of Dorothy Hewett, Helen Garner, Judith Wright, Jack Hibberd, Peter Carey, Michael Leunig, Christina Stead, Brett Whiteley, Germaine Greer, Ruby Hunter, Murray Bail, Alan Marshall, Kylie Tennant, Susan Ryan, Ita Buttrose, Max Dupain and Lily Brett. Her depiction of Miss Alesandra won the Gallery's National Photographic Portrait prize, for which she received $25,000 provided by Visa International. Mitelman says of her approach that;

“taking photographs is a bit like a temporary infatuation, for me, because, I'm not interested in taking awkward pictures of somebody, so it's a bit like...that process when you fall in love with somebody.”

Of Mitelman's portraits of dogs when displayed at Waverley City Gallery (Monash Gallery of Art), critic Anna Clabburn wrote;

As with American photographer Bill Wegman's much earlier portraits of his pet weimaraners, there's much to be learnt from Mitelman's comic-yet-serious transposition of dogs into human guise. The anthropomorphic quality of her subjects is both inviting and vaguely disturbing, and certainly makes us think more deeply about our relationship with the beasts we so easily call "pets'

== Exhibitions ==
- 2026, 25 November - 11 December: & Friends group show. MARS Gallery, Melbourne
- 2025, 1 March–25 May: The Basement: Photography from Prahran College (1968–1981), group exhibition. Museum of Australian Photography
- 2019/20, 21 September–20 January: A Dog’s Life, curators Maudie Palmer AO and Eugene Howard, Hamilton Gallery
- 2016: Finalist, Bowness Prize, Monash Gallery of Art
- 2014: Finalist, Pinnacles Gallery Portrait Prize
- 2013, May: On Cockatoo Island, Mars Gallery
- 2012: Smith Street Portrait Project, Gertrude Street Projection Festival
- 2011/12, October–February: Tarra Warra Museum of Art
- 2010: Finalist, National Photographic Portrait Prize, National Portrait Gallery
- 2008: Finalist, Olive Cotton Award, Tweed River Art Gallery
- 2007: Finalist, Olive Cotton Award, Tweed River Art Gallery
- 2008, April: Some Dogs, MARS Gallery Port Melbourne
- 2005, April: Mostly Strange, MARS Gallery Port Melbourne
- 2002, January 3-February 10: Investigations, Herring Island Environmental Sculpture Park
- 2002, October 8–25: Photomontage, J-Space Centre for Contemporary Art, Chisholm Institute
- 1998/9, November–31 January: Dog Portraiture, Monash Gallery of Art
- 1995, March 8-June 8: Beyond the Picket Fence: Australian women's art in the National Library collections, National Library of Australia, Canberra, opened by Andrea Stretton, 7 March 1995
- 1989, from 19 December: Literary Images, Jacqueline Mitelman, Virginia Wallace-Crabbe and Juno Gemes. Special collections section, library of the Australian Defence Force Academy, launched by Robin Wallace-Crabbe
- 1989, July 20–August 27: Jacqueline Mitelman, Jeff Busby, Greg Elms, Peter Leiss, Resurgence, The Photographers' Gallery
- 1988, to 26 November: Faces Of Australia, works by Jacqueline Mitelman The Art Gallery, 142 Greville St, Prahran
- 1984, to 1 July Still Movements: A photographic exhibition of images of dance. Mark Ashkanasy, Andrew Baker, Jeff Busby, Paul Cox, Branco Gaila, Stephen Hall, Werner Hammerstingl, Liz King, William Lasica, Jacqueline Mitelman, Russell Naughton, Bernie O'Regan, Athol Smith, Tome Sikora and Walter Stringer. Heide Gallery, Bulleen
- 1975, October 1-September 6: Wimmin: six wimmin photographers, National Gallery of Victoria, for International Women's Year
- 1975: Woman 1975, touring exhibition of the Women's Christian Association of Australia, Victoria, for International Women's Year
- 1974, July: Prahran College Photography students Matthew Nickson, Euan McGillivray and Jacqueline Mitelman. Brummels Gallery of Photography, 95 Toorak Road, South Yarra)

== Awards ==
- 2011: National Photographic Portrait Prize National Portrait Gallery
- 2004: Josephine Ulrick National Photography Prize

== Collections ==
- National Portrait Gallery
- National Library of Australia
- Australia Defence Force Academy Library
- National Gallery of Victoria
- Art Gallery of New South Wales
- State Library of Victoria
- Museum of Modern Art at Heide
- Monash Gallery of Art
- Tweed River Art Gallery

== Publications ==
- Mitelman, Jacqueline; Horne, Donald (1988), Faces of Australia, Lothian, ISBN 978-0-85091-343-9
- Mitelman, Jacqueline; Gaston, Vivien; TarraWarra Museum of Art (2011), Jacqueline Mitelman : facetime, TarraWarra Museum of Art
- Horn, Michael; Hanover Welfare Services; Stegley Foundation (1995), Women alone ... : stepping forward : a report on homelessness experienced by lone women (1995 ed.), Hanover Welfare Services, ISBN 978-0-9588815-2-4
