= Peter Milne (visual artist) =

Australian photographer and visual artist

Peter Milne (born 1960) is an Australian photographer and visual artist, born and living in Melbourne.

Milne studied at Swinburne Community School 1972–73 and undertook the photography course at Prahran College of Advanced Education. He is known for his early work documenting the 1970s Melbourne punk scene and the first decade of the Melbourne International Comedy Festival.

The 2018 monograph Fool's Paradise: The Early Years of the Melbourne Comedy Festival consists largely of candid images of comedians taken in bars and backstage. In 2020 he published a book of works made in his late teens and early 20s, Juvenalia, with photographs of Rowland S. Howard, Nick Cave and Mick Harvey, their bands The Birthday Party and The Boys Next Door as well as their friends, including Gina Riley, Polly Borland and Anita Lane.

From the early 2000s, Milne's practice has focused on creating narratives using montage, collage and constructed 'film-stills' from movies that don't exist.

== Publications ==
- Fish in a barrel: Nick Cave and the Bad Seeds on Tour. Tender Prey, 1994. Reprinted by 2.13.61. ISBN 1880985179.
- Beautiful lies : notes towards a history of Australia. Queensland Centre for Photography; St Peters, NSW: T&G, 2011. ISBN 9780977579075.
- When Nature Forgets. Melbourne: M.33, 2013. ISBN 9780987167040.
- A day in the life of Rowland S. Howard. Melbourne: M.33, 2015. ISBN 9780992430276.
- The Oddfellow's Daughter. Melbourne: M.33, 2015. ISBN 9780992430252.
- Fool's Paradise: The Early Years of The Melbourne Comedy Festival. Melbourne: M.33, 2008. ISBN 9780994517081. With essays by Judith Lucy, Sue-Ann Post, Greg Hocking and Kevin Whyte.
- Personal Hygiene. Melbourne: M.33, 2019. ISBN 9780994517012.
- Juvenalia. Melbourne: M.33, 2020. ISBN 9780648489931.

== Collections ==
Milne's work is held in the following public collections:

- Australian Performing Arts Collection,
- City Gallery, Melbourne Town Hall, Melbourne, Australia
- Monash Gallery of Art, City of Monash, Melbourne, Victoria, Australia
