= Pam Hallandal =

Australian female artist delineator, sculptor, printmaker, educator (1929–2018)

- Born: 16 January 1929; Melbourne, Australia
- Died: 25 September 2018 (aged 89); Melbourne, Australia
- Education: 1956 - 1957 Central School of Arts and Crafts, London, England, UK c.1950 Royal Melbourne Institute of Technology, Melbourne, Victoria
- Known for: Drawing and Printmaking
- Movement: Australian Figurative Drawing
- Awards: Dobell Drawing Prize 1996 and 2009

Pam Hallandal (16 January 1929 - 25 September 2018) was an Australian artist, best known for her work in drawing and print making.

== Early life and education ==
Born in Melbourne, Australia in 1929 Hallandal was the daughter of an amateur painter and architect who encouraged her interest in art. Enrolling in 1946 at RMIT, initially sculpture in sculpture, she was discouraged from attending because of her small stature and minimal limp, a result of childhood polio, so moved to ceramics. She received her Associate Diploma in 1950. During the later part of her study Hallandal also took evening classes with Ola Cohn.

== Career ==
In the 1950s and in her early twenties, Hallandal set up her own sculpture studio, producing small scale modernist sculpture in ceramics and wood, and showing her work at the Victorian Artists Society 1949–1965, and competed beside male artists, Cohn, Anita Aarons, Tina Wentscher and others in 1952 to have her Monument for the Unknown Political Prisoner selected for an international exhibition in London, judged at the Art Gallery of New South Wales and won by Margel Hinder. She was employed from 1952–56 at the Coonac Rehabilitation Centre in Toorak.

Traveling to London, Hallandal studied for a Post Diploma at the Central School of Art in London from 1956 - 1957. She toured galleries and museums in England, France, Germany, Holland, Belgium and Norway.

After her return, Hallandal's practice largely shifted focus to drawing but she produced utility ceramic ware to finance her sculpture. She was a member of the Victorian Sculptors Society. Over 1964–66 she traveled throughout Southeast Asia, and in 1970 visited Thailand, then during 1974 taking study leave, she toured colleges and galleries in U.S.A. and Mexico.

== Educator ==
From 1958 Hallandal taught sculpture, ceramics and drawing at Prahran Technical College, meanwhile gaining her Trained Technical Teachers Certificate in 1960 and teaching briefly at the George Bell School, before being appointed by Alan Warren, who taught her at RMIT, as Senior Lecturer in Charge of Drawing. In 1964 she completed a Fellowship (F.R.M.I.T.) in sculpture at Royal Melbourne Institute of Technology.

It was her experience of teaching drawing, Hallandal said, that led to her devoting her career to the two-dimensional medium rather than sculpture: "I found it hard to teach drawing seriously and make sculpture. Some people argue that it is better to teach outside your own area, but in order to be good enough to teach drawing well, you have to spend a lot of time and energy and be able to hold the concepts sufficiently tautly"

The institution became Victoria College Prahran in 1980, and after its amalgamation in 1991 with the Victorian College of the Arts, Hallandal continued her long career in education as Head of Drawing there, compulsorily retiring aged 70 in 1993.

Hallandal contributed in 1981 to curriculum design for drawing in secondary schools. She championed observational drawing, draftsmanship and drawing education, actively fighting to keep the practice alive within the tertiary syllabus in Victoria.

== Work ==
Hallandal's drawings are figurative charcoal, pastel and ink works on paper. Using dramatic effects through contrasting light and shadow, gestural overdrawing and pentimento, Hallandal's works are dark and expressive. She recorded her distinctive vision of the world and the life that took place around her, from prosaic details of suburban life to tragic and cataclysmic world events. In portraits, self-portraits, global and daily scenes like the triptych To the tune of the cash register, 1991, or the rondos Tsunami (2005) depicting the Indonesian disaster, Hallandals's works are bold, gestural and often foreboding. Sasha Grishin, reviewing in 1992 the survey show Contemporary Australian Drawings at the Nolan Gallery, Canberra, singled out her work:

A highlight of the show is the quite exceptional triptych by the Melbourne sculptor, Pam Hallandal, titled 'To the tune of the cash register, 1991'. There is something claustrophobic in her construction of space with a nervous expressive line that is reminiscent of Joy Hester's work several decades earlier. It is a work about urban angst and despair observed from a woman's perspective.

== Selected exhibitions ==
- 1979, March: Mornington Peninsular Spring Festival For Drawing. Works by Charles Blackman, Judy Cassab, Noel Counihan, Barbara Grosman, Raphael Gurvich, Anne Hall, Pam Hallandal, Jean Knox, Kevin Lincoln, Geoffrey Lowe, Jan Senbergs and Andrew Sibley were purchased upon the advice of Rick Amor, Joan Lindsay and Alan McCulloch
- 1983, March: Mornington Peninsula Arts Centre Spring Festival of Drawing. Works by Kathleen Boyle, Enid Denton, Tess Edwards, Pam Hallandal, Euan Heng, John Hopkins, Amanda Laming, Sue McDougall and Beverley Martorana were purchased upon the advice of Alan McCulloch and Andrew Sibley
- 1984: Mornington Peninsula Arts Centre Acquisitive Prints Exhibition. Works by Patrick Henigan, Hertha Kluge-Pott, Kevin Lincoln, Vivienne Littlejohn, Neil Malone, John Robinson and Patricia Wilson were purchased on the advice of Pam Hallandal, Alan McCulloch and Jan Senbergs
- 1985: Mornington Peninsula Arts Centre Spring Festival of Drawing. Works by Irene Barberis, Craig Gough, Pam Hallandal, Derek Hanley, Katherine Hattam, Elizabeth Jess, Amanda Laming, Lillian Townsend were acquired for the M.P.A.C. Collections on the advice of Alan McCulloch, Jan Minchin, Jan Senbergs
- 1987: Backlash: the revival of Australian drawing 1976–86. National Gallery of Victoria
- 1989, 6–30 June: Pam Hallandal: In the Shadow of the highrise, an exhibition of drawings. Stuart Gerstman Galleries, 29 Gipps Street, Richmond
- 1996, 14 December–2 February 1997: Expressive Figuration: drawings by Kevin Connor, Pam Hallandal and Jan Senbergs. Art Gallery of New South Wales
- 1998, 27 September–2 August 1999: Pam Hallandal: drawings. Touring show. Mornington Peninsula Regional Gallery 27 September–8 November 1998; Swan Hill Regional Art Gallery 5 February–14 March 1999; Gippsland Art Gallery. Sale 27 March–2 May 1999; Castlemaine Art Gallery and Historical Museum 27 June–2 August 1999
- 2001, 14 February—18 March: Through women's eyes. Presbyterian Ladies' College

== Public collections ==
- Art Gallery of New South Wales
- National Gallery of Victoria, Melbourne, Australia
- The Kedumba Collection of Australian Drawing
- National Library of Australia
- Queen Victoria Art Museum and Gallery, Launceston
- Tasmanian Museum and Art Gallery

== Awards and nominations ==
Pam Hallandal was awarded:

- Australian Dobell Drawing Prize for excellence in drawing in 1996 and 2009.
- Gold Coast Art Award, 1986, 1988

== Additional sources ==
- Cross, Elizabeth (1984), 'Pam Hallandal’, Art Bulletin of Tasmania, page 55.
- Hansen, David (1988), 'The face of Australia : the land & the people, the past & the present’, Fine Arts Press, Sydney, New South Wales.
- Kolenberg, Hendrik (1996), 'Expressive Figuration:Drawings by Kevin Connor, Pam Hallandal and Jan Senbergs’, Exhibition catalogue, 14 December 1996 – 2 February 1997, Art Gallery of New South Wales, Sydney, New South Wales.
- McCulloch, Allan (1984), 'Encyclopedia of Australian Art’, Hutchinson of Australia, Melbourne, Victoria (2nd edn).
