= Leonie Reisberg =

Australian photographer

- Born: 1955 (age 70–71); Melbourne, Australia
- Education: School of the Art Institute of Chicago
- Known for: Photography

Leonie Reisberg is an Australian photographer.

== Biography ==
Leonie Reisberg was born in 1955 in Melbourne, and studied Photography at R.M.I.T. for 2 years then at Prahran College of Advanced Education for a further 2 years. After teaching for a year, she went to U.S. to study for her Master of Fine Arts at the School of the Art Institute of Chicago.

In 1978 Reisberg returned to Melbourne to work as a graphic designer before moving to Adelaide in 1979 where she took up a lectureship in Photography at Torrens College. In 1982 the Visual Arts Board of the Australia Council granted her a participation fee through their regional development program for a national touring exhibition conducted over 1981-2.

Reisberg exhibited nationally and internationally into the 1990s, and at major Australia galleries in the 2000s.

Works by Reisberg may be found in major collections in Australia and overseas. Since the 1990s she has practiced as an art therapist.

== Exhibitions ==
- 1976, September 7–24; Victorian College of the Arts Gallery, Melbourne
- 1980, March; Nuance, Adelaide Festival Adelaide Festival of Arts (11th : 1980) (1980), Nuance : Adelaide Festival, March 1980, Nuance Art Publications
- 1981, September 17-October 11; Here there and back again: Leonie Reisberg and recent works by Cartier-Bresson, The Developed Image, Adelaide
- 1981; exhibition in conjunction with the experimental theatre piece Basketweaving for amateurs at Bouverie Street, Carlton
- 1981-1982; touring exhibition in regional galleries from Mount Gambier in South Australia to Darwin in the Northern Territory
- 1982, 13 Oct–3 Nov; Leonie Reisberg Photo collage, Roslyn Oxley9 Gallery, Sydney
- 1983; National Photographic Exhibition, Albury Regional Art Centre. Artists: Ann Balla, Ingrid Borberg, Kate Breakey, Kathie Crawford, Alan Cruikshank, Ed Douglas, Max Dupain, Peter Elliston, Nina Girling, Mark Kimber, Merryle Johnson, Ron McCormick, Danny McDonald, Chris Meadham, Trevor Peters, Philip Quirk, Leonie Reisberg, Miriam Stannage, Mark Strizic, Allan Vizents, Richard Woldendorp.
- 1983; Australie: re-constructed vision : oeuvres contemporaines avec photographies Exhibition created by the Art Gallery of New South Wales, Sydney, and the Australia Council for the Festival d'Automne, Paris. Artists: Christine Godden, Fiona Hall, Douglas Holleley, Mike Parr, Leonie Reisberg, Lynn Silverman, John Williams, Micky Allen, Warren Breninger, Peter Charuk
- 1984, 30 June–12 August: Contemporary Photography from the Collection, Art Gallery of New South Wales, Sydney
- 1986, January: Ten years on, Art Gallery of New South Wales, Sydney
- 1997; Flatlands: photography and everyday space, Art Gallery of New South Wales, Sydney
- 1999/2000, 31 July-31 January: Inside Out: Still Life and Interiors Post 1950, Art Gallery of New South Wales, Sydney
- 2014, 1 February to 30 March; Wildcards: Bill Henson Shuffles The Deck, Monash Gallery of Art
- 2020/21, 22 Feb–3 Jan: Shadow Catchers, Art Gallery of New South Wales, Sydney
- 2022: Retrospective A History In The Making at Manning Regional Gallery NSW
- 2023/24, 1 July-7 January: Triptych, in 'Open Studio (brick vase clay cup jug)' Art Gallery of New South Wales, Sydney

== Collections ==
- National Gallery of Australia
- National Library of Australia
- Art Gallery of South Australia
- National Gallery of Victoria
- Art Gallery of New South Wales
- Polaroid collection, Museum of Photography WestLicht
- Art Institute of Chicago
- Philip Morris Collection
- Bendigo Art Gallery
- Eastman Photography Center-Rochester NY
- Centre for Contemporary Photography, University of Arizona
