= Allan Mitelman =

Polish-Australian painter, printmaker and art teacher

Allan Mitelman (6 August 1946, Poland to 18 April 2025 Australia) was an Australian painter, printmaker and art teacher who arrived in Australia in 1953.

== Biography ==
Allan Mitelman was brought to Australia from Poland as a child in 1953. He and photographer Jacqueline Mitelman (née MacGreggor) were briefly married.

== Training and career ==
He received his early training from his art teacher, the Austrian-born sculptor Karl Duldig, before studying architecture for a year. He then studied at the Prahran College of Advanced Education 1965–68. He consolidate his interest in printmaking with further studies at the Royal Melbourne Institute of Technology (RMIT) soon after which, in 1972, Mitelman was included with Martin Sharp, Arthur Boyd and Fred Williams in the exhibition Australian Prints at the Victoria & Albert Museum, London and an etching and lithograph by Mitelman was acquired by the Museum of Modern Art in New York.

== Teaching ==
Mitelman contributed to the arts through his teaching. He lectured at the National Gallery of Victoria School in 1972 and the Victorian College of the Arts, Melbourne where he was head of a separate department of printmaking, but in the merger of Prahran College with the VCA in 1992, he was replaced by John Scurry, Head of Printmaking at Prahran in a new and expanded department. Both had been students at Prahran together and they enjoyed an amicable friendship. He has been the subject of portraits by former students for the Archibald Prize, most notably Lewis Miller whose portrait of the artist won the Prize in 1998.

== Style and reception ==
Mitelman's paintings are non-figurative and minimalist, inspired by children's early mark-making and musical scores, with an interest rhythms and harmonies of hue and texture through layering and manipulation of paint with a palette knife. Alan Krell and Suzanne Davis compare his work to that of the American artist Cy Twombly and the English artist Roger Hilton respectively. McCulloch describes his paintings as like the prints in having "a sensuous refinement of surface enlivened with accents, their quality often being complemented by evocative titles."

== Awards ==
- 1970 Geelong Print Prize
- 1972 Henri Worland Print Prize, Warrnambool Art Gallery
- 1973 VAB grant
- 1974 Corio Art Prize
- 1976 Wollongong Art Purchase Prize
- 1976 Fremantle Arts Centre Print Prize
- 1977 Bathurst Art Award
- 1989 Fellowship from the Visual Arts and Crafts Board of the Australia Council
- 2004 Sulman Prize, AGNSW

== Collections ==
- National Gallery of Australia, Canberra
- British Museum
- National Gallery of Victoria
- Queensland Art Gallery, Brisbane
- Art Gallery of South Australia
- Baillieu Library Print Collection, The University of Melbourne, Victoria
- Heidi Museum of Modern Art, Bulleen, Melbourne
- Christchurch City Art Gallery, Christchurch
- Auckland City Art Gallery, Auckland
- Museum of Modern Art, New York

== Exhibitions ==
=== Solo ===
Mitelman held annual solo exhibitions from 1969 including in Melbourne at Crossley St, Powell St, Pinacotheca, 312 Lennox St, Deutscher Brunswick St.; in Sydney at Macquarie, Garry Anderson, Ray Hughes; and in Perth at Galerie Düsseldorf. In 2004 the National Gallery of Victoria held a major survey of Mitelman's works on paper, curated by Elizabeth Cross, which also toured to the Art Gallery of New South Wales.

=== Group and survey ===
Mitelman's work was included in many print surveys and graphic art exhibitions.

- 1974: Ninth International Print Biennale. Tokyo
- 1975 Twelve Australian Lithographers. National Gallery of Victoria
- 1976 East Coast Drawings. IMA, Brisbane
- 1989 Prints and Australia: Pre-settlement to Present, National Gallery of Australia
- 1992 Reference Points: A New Perspective, Queensland Art Gallery
- 1994 Silent Objects: Non-Objective Art from Melbourne. Centre for Contemporary Art, Hamilton, New Zealand
- 1998 Southern Reflections, 10 Australian Artists. Stockholm, Sweden
