= Prahran Telegraph =

Weekly newspaper published from 1860 to 1930 in Prahran, Melbourne, Australia

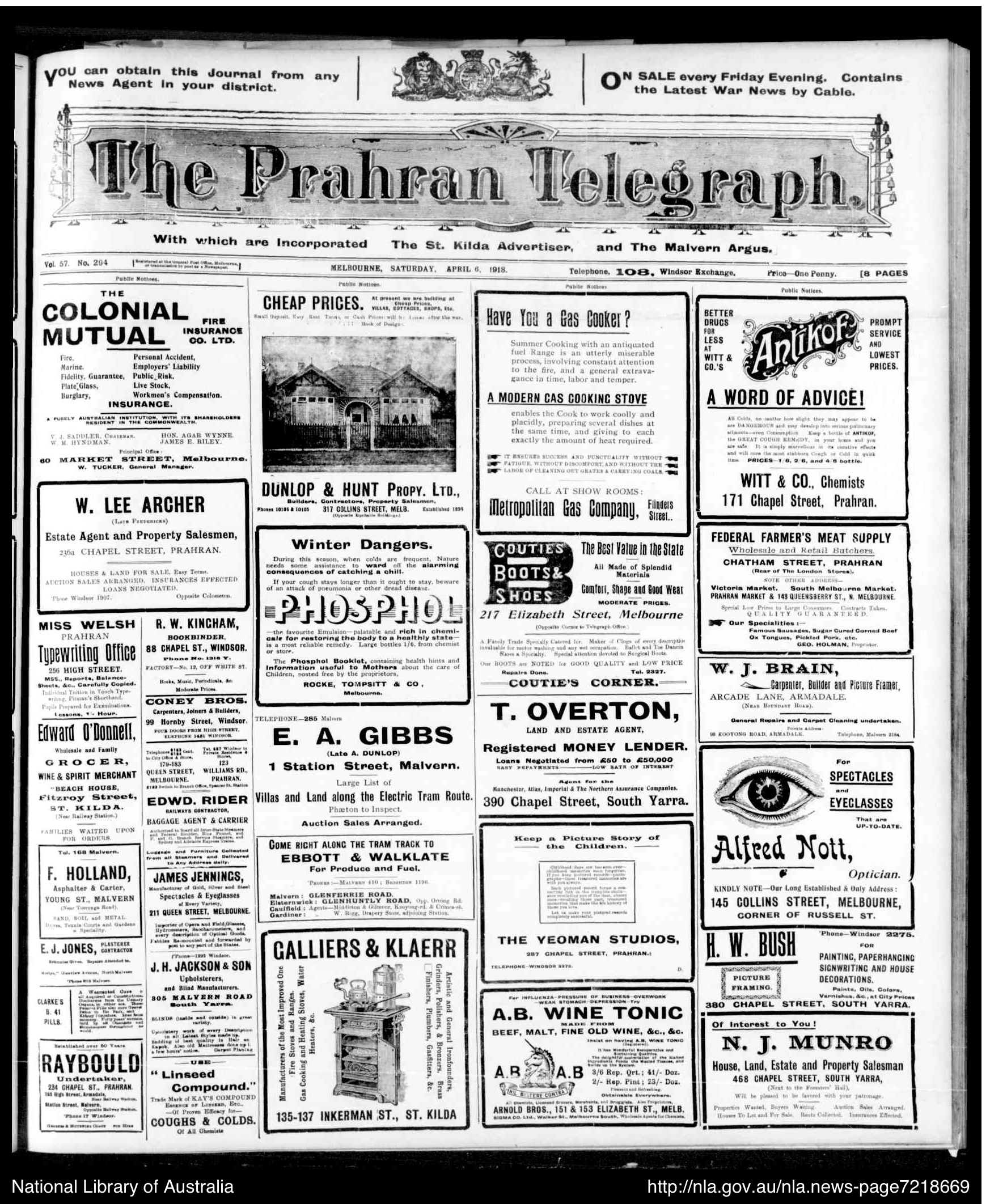
- Front page from April 1918
- Type: Weekly newspaper
- Founder(s): Howard Spensley
- Founded: 1860
- Language: English
- Ceased publication: 1930
- Headquarters: various in Prahran, Victoria

The Prahran Telegraph was a weekly newspaper published from 1860 to 1930 in Prahran, an inner-suburb of the city of Melbourne, Australia. No copy pre-1866 is known to have survived. From 1866 (or earlier) until December 1888, the paper was called the Telegraph and St Kilda, Prahran and South Yarra Guardian. From January 1889 until 7 December 1902, the paper was known simply as the Prahran Telegraph. From 13 December 1902 the banner head read the Prahran Telegraph, with which is incorporated the St Kilda Advertiser and the Malvern Argus.

The newspaper was probably started by Howard Spensley, who sold it within several years to William Osment. The preceding Prahran and St Kilda Advertiser was first published by John Hartley in 1857, and continued until at least 1861. The Osment family owned the Telegraph until 1882, and again from 1895-1905. Henry Osment was prominent in local affairs and on Prahran Council, serving as Mayor for 1888/89.

In general, the paper was published weekly, though at various times the frequency was increased to twice weekly. On 5 January 1889—the same issue in which the banner head was changed (see above) -- the paper moved to bi-weekly publication, declaring itself "... the first bi-weekly suburban newspaper ever issued in Australia".

In 2012 microfilm copies of the newspaper held at the State Library of Victoria began being digitised and made available in the National library of Australia's Trove newspaper search repository.

== Location and ownership ==
Various sources confirm the paper as starting in 1860, with Howard Spensley sometimes identified as the first owner. However, ratebook research shows that Spensley took over the printery office from John Hartley only in 1862, so it is possible that Hartley in fact started the Telegraph. Alternatively, it is also possible that Spensley was publishing the Telegraph from another address from 1860-1861, but he has not as yet been noted in ratebooks or directories. An obituary for Spensley published in the Telegraph (23 August 1902) referred to Spensley somewhat enigmatically as "... practically the founder of this journal, being the first editor and proprietor".

John Hartley was publishing the Prahran and St Kilda Advertiser from offices in Chapel Street in 1857. He is listed in the ratebooks from 1857-1861 at the address subsequently occupied by Spensley. The property is listed as a printery in 1858 and 1860, but not in 1859. The Sands & McDougall directory lists the Prahran Advertiser Office (Goulding & Co) at this address in 1862, and the following year, Prahran Telegraph and Advertiser under Spensley. Perhaps publication of the papers overlapped at that printery in 1862 and 1863. Note that Goulding & Co were the publishers of the St. Kilda Chronicle and Prahran, South Yarra, Windsor, Brighton, & South District Advertiser from issue No. 1 in August 1858 until at least August 1861, the latest known extant edition of that paper. During that period, the paper was published from Barkly Street, Junction, St Kilda.

In the 1864 ratebooks, W.H. Osment, a printer, is shown 4 doors south of Spensley's printing office in Chapel Street, not far south of Greville Street. In 1865, the printery is shown in the ratebooks at Osment's rented property, with Spensley having moved on. This is consistent with J.B. Cooper’s History of Prahran (1924) p. 279 which claims that Spensley still owned the Telegraph in 1864. Note however Henry Osment's obituary (Prahran Telegraph 3 March 1906): "... In March 1862, Mr W.H. Osment (deceased's father) acquired the goodwill and copyright of the Prahran Telegraph, which subsequently fell into his son's possession".

By 1865, the Prahran Telegraph occupied 223 Chapel Street, where it remained until 1910 when it moved to new premises in King Street, Prahran. It was published from there until at least 1930. In 1866, Osment's printery is shown two doors further south again along Chapel Street, south of Coulson's corn store. This appears to be the location of the Telegraph office from that time until the move to King Street in 1910.

In the 1870s, the office was numbered as 101 Chapel Street, two doors south of the Telegraph Hotel. It was later renumbered as 223. It is shown on the MMBW plan c. 1896, with the office opposite and slightly north of Anchor Place, and with the printing room set back behind the shopfronts of 219-223.

The Osment family owned and published the paper until 1882, when it was sold to Crabb and Brotherton. Aubrey Brotherton left the company in 1887 to take over a rival paper, the Prahran Chronicle. In 1891, the paper was owned and published by John May Yelland, with Yelland "proprietor in his own right and as Administrator of estate of James Halls Crab [sic] deceased". Yelland was Crabb's brother-in-law.

The Osment family purchased the Telegraph again in March 1895 from Crabb & Yelland, retaining ownership until Arthur Tilley took over on 22 Oct 1905. Brotherton returned as owner and publisher of the Telegraph on 22 October 1910, and remained in that position until at least 1928. (page 65). For a photo of the paper's second site (in King Street, Prahran), see p. 69. Detail on this photo shows a sign on the office 'Established 1860-1910', confirming the starting year.

Another owner of the Telegraph was Aubrey Brotherton. From 1882-87 this was in partnership with James Crabb, before Brotherton left to take over a rival paper, the Prahran Chronicle (published c. 1879-1919). In 1910, he returned as owner and publisher of the Telegraph, and continued until at least 1928.
