= John Davis (sculptor) =

- Born: John Davis; 1936
- Known for: Sculpture
- Notable work: Tree Piece, Fish and Pebbles
- Movement: Arte Povera

John Davis (16 September 1936 – 17 October 1999) was an Australian sculptor and pioneer of environmental art.

== Early life and education ==
Born in Ballarat, Victoria, on 16 September 1936, John Davis traces the development of his work from the early wood carvings produced while he was a young man living in Mildura in the early 1960s.

He studied at the Royal Melbourne Institute of Technology, Caulfield institute of technology and Melbourne Teachers College before becoming a lecturer in sculpture at Prahran College of Advanced Education 1972 - c. 1992.

== Work ==
An Australian exponent of Arte Povera, he famously developed a new mode of site-specific art at the Mildura Sculpture Triennial in the early 1970s. His most influential work, which was entitled Tree Piece, was made by encasing the trunks of several growing trees on the banks of the Murray River with, alternately, papier mache, mud, latex, coiled string, plastic cling wrap, and twigs bound together. The impermanent work was then allowed to weather and rot away. It was a breakthrough which led many sculptors to reconsider the fate of outdoor works, and whether the fabrication of art might in some way adversely impact on the environment.

Taking his cues from Aboriginal artefacts, Davis later became chiefly known for tender assembled works made of natural materials, including leaves and twigs, intended to highlight the fragile beauty of nature.

His sculpture, Bicycle II (1976), was purchased by the National Gallery of Australia.

In 1978 he represented Australia in the Australia Pavilion at the Venice Biennale.

== Teaching ==
Davis taught first in regional high schools, then was hired to teach sculpture in 1972 at Prahran College where Fred Cress had been employed by Principal Alan Warren in 1969 to set up what would become Prahran's foundation year in Art & Design with the support of Gordon Leviston. Cress, who had previously begun a similar program at Caulfield Tech brought Victor Majzner and Davis across from Caulfield. Davis was Head of Sculpture from 1973, when his moving the sculpture department from the ground to the top floor of the Art and Design building caused some dissatisfaction amongst some students who continued to study on the ground floor in the ceramics and the work shop complex under lecturer Caroline May. David Wilson joined his staff also that year and took over as head when Davis left in 1982 for the Victorian College of the Arts. In his final appointment Davis was Coordinator of Post Graduate Studies at the Victorian College of the Arts for many years.

== Exhibitions ==
- 1973, 1–26 September: Place, Monash University Gallery

== See also ==
- Environmental sculpture

== Sources ==
- Artlink
