= Basil Hadley =

English Australian printmaker and painter

Basil Hadley (1940 in London, England – 2006 in Stepney, Adelaide) was an English Australian printmaker and painter. His works are represented in National and State public galleries around Australia and in various private collections.

== Biography ==
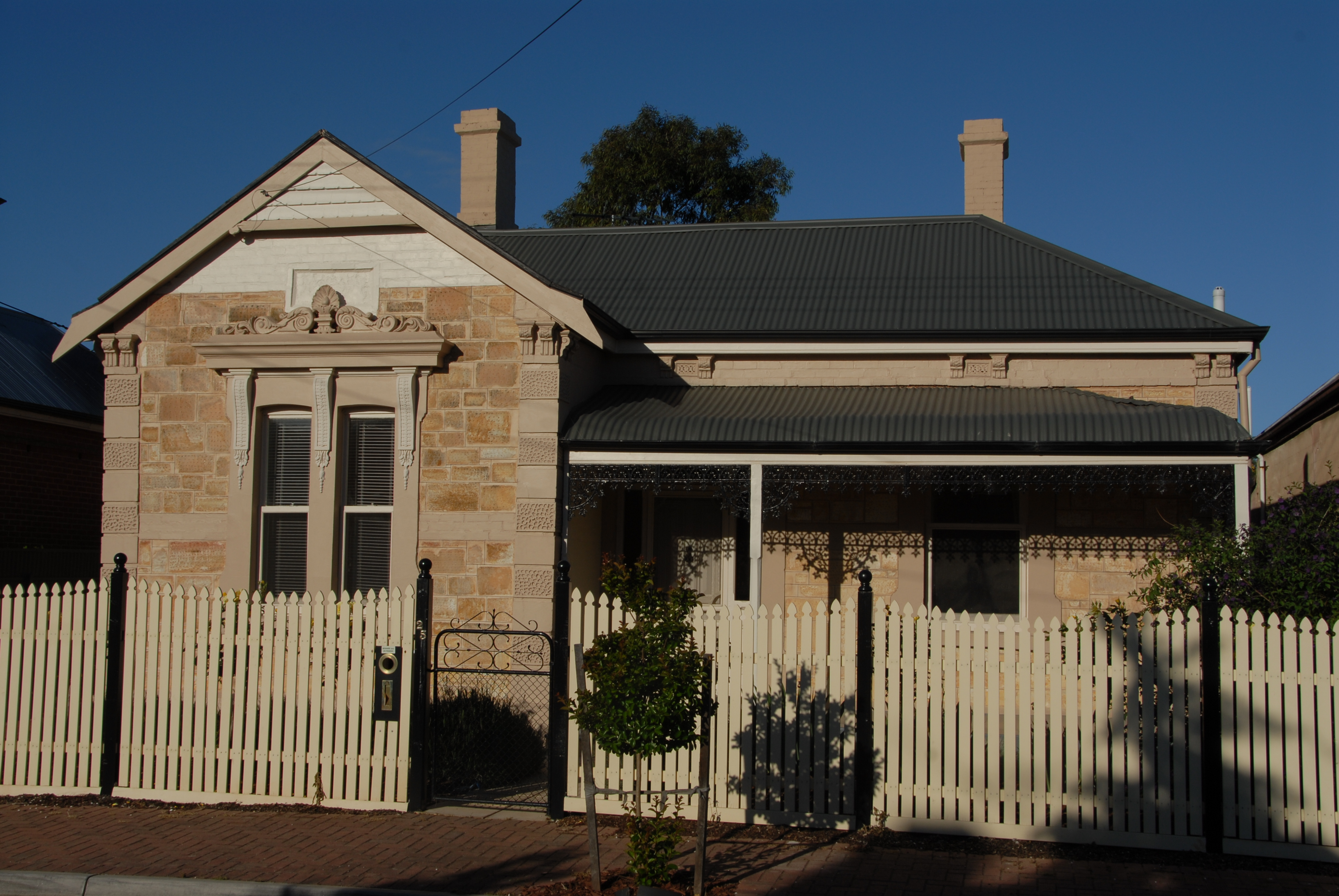
Basil Hadley's house. Stepney, South Australia (1975-2006)

Basil Hadley studied at the Ealing College of Art in London. He came to Australia in 1965 and studied printmaking at the Prahran College of Advanced Education, Melbourne.

From 1975 until his death in October 2006, he resided in Stepney, Adelaide, South Australia with his wife Tanya who died a few months prior to Hadley.

The estate of the late Basil Hadley, including paintings, graphics and book collection were auctioned by Elder Fine Art, North Adelaide in 2007.

== Techniques ==
Hadley was known well known for exploring various styles and techniques such as:

- humor
- abstract
- Australian landscape
- birds
- cats

== Exhibitions ==
One-man shows included: Max Adams Gallery, Adelaide 1971; Toorak Gallery Melbourne, 1971, 1972, 1974, 1976; Macquarie Gallery, Canberra 1972-74; Desborough Gallery, Perth 1973; Lister Gallery, Perth 1975, 1978; Fremantle Arts Centre 1975; Anne Simons Gallery, Canberra 1976; Osborne Art Gallery, Adelaide 1976; Salamanca Place Gallery, Hobart 1977; Bonython Gallery, Adelaide 1978.

Group shows included: Henri Worland Memorial Prize, Warrnambool, Victoria 1974; 'Australian and New Zealand Printmakers', New Zealand 1975.

== Awards ==
- 1973 Inez Hutchinson Prize, Victoria
- 1974 Bunbury Purchase Prize, Western Australia
- 1974 David Jones Prize, Western Australia
- 1975 Albany Prize, Western Australia
- 1976 R.M. Ansett-Hamilton Award, Victoria
- 1976 Print Council of Australian Members Print Commission
- 1977 Gold Coast City Art Prize, Queensland
- 1977 Kernewek Lowender Art Prize, South Australia
- 1979 Joint winner of the Fremantle Print Award
- 1981 Broken Hill Art Prize, NSW
- 1984 Nominated for BHP Award for the Pursuit of Excellence
- 1985 Barossa Valley Vintage Festival Art Prize, SA
- 1987 Painting Section of the 19th Alice Prize, NT
- 1989 Kernewek Lowender Art Prize, Foundation South Australia Art Award

== Represented ==
Basil Hadley's works have been represented at: Gold Coast Civic Art Collection, Queensland; Queensland Art Gallery; Alice Springs Art Foundation, NT; Rabaul Art Gallery, Papua New Guinea; WA Art Gallery; University of WA; La Trobe University, Vic; Reserve Bank of Australia Collection, NSW; Dunedin Public Art Gallery, NZ; Sydney College of the Arts, NSW; Joshua McClelland Gallery, Vic; Townsville Art Gallery, Qld; Hamilton Regional Gallery, Vic.; Castlemaine Art Museum, Vic; Canberra and Tas Colleges of Advanced Education; Print Council of Australia Collection; Melbourne Metropolitan Board of Works Collection, Vic; Australian Wheat Board, Vic; Bunbury Art Gallery, WA; Fremantle Art Centre, WA; Devonport Gallery and Art Centre, Tas; Albany Town Council Collection, WA; Graylands Teachers College, WA; Claremont Teachers College, WA; Private collections in France, USA, Australia and UK, including BHP Co Ltd.

== Bibliography ==
- Basil Hadley, by David Dolan (1991)
