= Allan Vizents =

American-Australian Conceptual Artist

Allan Vizents (1945–1987) was an American artist who lived and worked in Australia. He was a founding member of Perth based conceptual art group Media-Space, active from 1981 to 1986. He moved to Sydney in 1986 and took up the role of director of the organisation Performance Space, until his death in 1987.

Vizents was born in California in 1945, and arrived in Perth in October 1978. His initial interest was in photography, and his work from this period is held in collections of the State Library of Western Australia, John Curtin Gallery, and the Art Gallery of Western Australia. The group Media-Space was formed by Vizents along with Paul Thomas, Jeff Jones, Ann Graham, Judy Chambers, Neil Sullivan, Brian McKay and Lindsay Parkhill and many other occasional participants. Together they established a space in Perth to combat the isolation of the city, and enable artists to access resources and to engage in discussions regarding ideas and recent occurrences in local and world arts. During this time, Vizents developed the performance and audio artwork that he would become renowned for. Along with PRAXIS, another Perth-based art group from this period, Media-Space formed the initial proposal to use the old Perth Boys School as the site for what became the Perth Institute of Contemporary Arts (PICA). During these years, Vizents met and married Patsy Vizents (nee. Bradbury). Vizents left Perth in 1986 to become the director of Sydney's Performance Space, but his tenure was cut short by his death on 19 March 1987.
