= Christopher Beaumont =

Australian painter

- Born: 1961; Melbourne, Australia
- Education: Prahran College of Advanced Education; Victorian College of the Arts
- Known for: Still life painting
- Awards: Conrad Jupiters Art Prize (1994); People’s Choice Prize - Arthur Guy Memorial Painting Prize (2005)

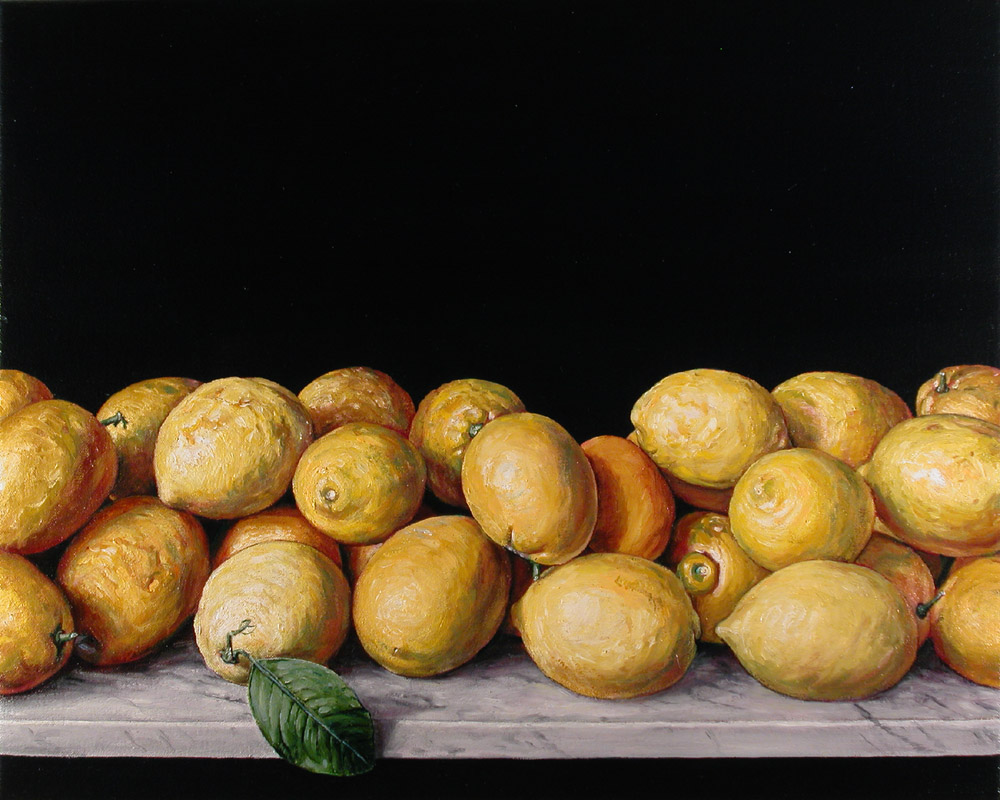
Still Life with Lemons

Christopher Beaumont (born 1961) is an Australian still life painter. His paintings are in many institutional, corporate, and private collections.

== Early life and education ==
Christopher Beaumont was born in Melbourne in 1961.

In 1983 Beaumont studied for a MB., BS. degree from the University of Melbourne (1983).

In 1984, he also received a diploma in art and design from the Prahran College of Advanced Education, taking life drawing and painting classes with Howard Arkley. He graduated with a BFA in painting & sculpture from the Victorian College of the Arts in 1987. He also holds a graduate diploma in multimedia software Development from the Swinburne University of Technology.

== Career ==
In 1988 Beaumont participated in the large group exhibition Site of Execution at the Australian Centre for Contemporary Art.

In 1989 he joined Bruce Pollard's Pinacotheca Gallery in Richmond and travelled to Europe: Amsterdam, Athens, Taormina, Naples, Rome and Paris. Pollard retired a few years later and he joined the Botanical Gallery, directed by Sue Corlett in South Yarra. The gallery later became Scope gallery when it moved to Brunswick Street, Fitzroy.

== Recognition and awards ==
He participates in many Australian art exhibitions, and has won multiple awards.

In 1989 he was a finalist in the Moet et Chandon Touring Exhibition prize, acquired by the Margaret Stewart Endowment for the National Gallery of Victoria.

In 1994 he shared the Conrad Jupiters Art Prize with Guan Wei. That same year he was invited to exhibit with Eva Breuer in Woollarhra, New South Wales.

In 2004, he was finalist in the Arthur Guy Memorial Painting Prize, and was the People's Choice winner of the Arthur Guy Memorial Painting Prize, Bendigo Art Gallery. This involved a solo exhibition which was staged in 2006 at The Bendigo Art Gallery followed by a solo exhibition at Eva Breuer's gallery later that year.

In 2014 he was invited by Fortyfivedownstairs in Flinders Lane, Melbourne to be Artist in Residence and staged an exhibition of paintings commissioned across the previous two decades alongside new works produced during the residency.

Other prizes include:

- Hans and Sylvia Sumberg Prize (VCA, 1987)
- St Kilda City Council Prize (1992; non acquisitive)
- Sweet Design Acquisitive Prize - Linden Postcard Show, St Kilda (1999)
- Art Spectrum Finest Artist Colours Prize, Linden Postcard Show, St Kilda (2000)

== Art practice ==
Beaumont's work is influenced by Spanish masters of the early 17th century, particularly Juan Sánchez Cotán and Francisco de Zurbarán. He typically works in oil paint on linen, painting common vegetables or other market produce, often with a dark background and modernist, post-modern elements.
