= Noela Hjorth =

Australian artist (1940–2016)

Noela Hjorth (5 December 1940 – 17 February 2016) was an Australian artist and builder of houses, known as living sculptures. Her work reveals a fascination with the female form and its spiritual manifestations, exploring the mythology of ancient civilisation, Western approaches to nature enshrined in Celtic and Druid traditions, and the mysticism of Eastern religion.

== Biography ==
Noela Hjorth, printmaker, painter and sculptor, was born and studied in Melbourne, and trained at Chelsea Art School in London. Along with key printmakers such as Noel Counihan, she left a legacy as an important printmaker who helped to establish the print workshops at the Meat Market in the 1970s and 80s.

While her earlier works were characterised by female iconography, her later work deployed discarded materials into ecological social sculptures. Her later work had a strong environmental message about the role of ecology and obsolescence and took the form of social habitual structures she called living sculptures.

In Australia, her works can be found National Gallery, Canberra, in all State and many regional galleries. She has had 30 one-person exhibitions throughout Australia and overseas and has been included in numerous international group exhibitions including the Whitechapel Gallery and Victoria and Albert Museum (both in London, UK).

Noela Hjorth has been cited in numerous reviews and within significant collective works on art and artists such as Pat Gilmour's Lasting Impressions (Australian National Gallery, 1988), Alan McCulloch's Encyclopedia of Australian Art, (Hutchinson Group, 1992). Two monographs on her life and work have been published: the first by Vicki Pauli and Judith Rodriguez, Noela Hjorth (Granrott Press, 1984); and the second, a substantial book of 191 pages illustrated largely in colour, Noela Hjorth: Journey of a Fire Goddess (Craftsman House, 1989). During her career, the role of books as art played an ongoing role in her practice and she made numerous limited edition print art books such as Flights of Fantasy and Trees of Wisdom.

From the 1980s, her work took on a strong focus in combining art with anthropology. She traveled frequently to many countries such as Indonesia and India to document rituals and ceremonies. In Australia, she was more interested in connecting with indigenous people than competing in the white art world. She frequently went to Arnhem Land and Kakadu National Park to watch ceremonies and visit cave paintings. She had an insatiable appetite for cross-cultural collaboration.

The 1990s saw her shift her focus away from conventional art contexts and she began to exhibit in cathedrals. 1994 was her most prolific year in that decade with exhibitions including retrospective works and recent sculptures at St Peter's Cathedral in conjunction with the Adelaide Festival, with subsequent exhibitions at the Greenaway Art Gallery, Kent Town, South Australia and the Melbourne Contemporary Art Gallery, Victoria. These exhibitions were not without controversy, especially as much of Hjorth's repurposed iconography such as seedpods looked unmistakably like vaginas. As Adelaide art critic Samela Harris noted, 'Adelaide's Establishment was scandalised. "Nudes in unholy row", huffed the headlines. "Women's genitalia in a church", hissed indignant city matrons.'

From the turn of the 21st century, Hjorth’s work took on a more majestic dimension in terms of scale. Having spent much of the 1990s sculpting with recycled and obsolescent materials like foundry moulds for sand casting, Hjorth brought her passions—art, anthropology (material cultures) and architecture—together by building houses she called ‘living sculptures’. Deploying entirely recycled materials, these living sculptures were often mistaken by experts as heritage. Her last ‘living sculpture’, completed in 2011 in Semaphore, was dedicated to the living memory of her son, chess champion and mathematician, the late Professor Greg Hjorth. The house won a local government Heritage Award in Urban Design and Character for a New Development.

== Family and personal life ==
In Melbourne 1962, Noela married Bob Hjorth and their son Greg Hjorth was born in 1963. After moving to London, their daughter Larissa was born in 1971. After her first marriage ended, Noela met and married John Olsen and moved to Clarendon, South Australia. Noela stayed on at Clarendon after her second marriage ended. She then reconnected with Graham Webb, who had been an early boyfriend, and spent over 20 years together (Graham died in November 2015). They lived in Adelaide, South Australia.

== Select works ==
- Mother and Son, 1960, Woodcut, 25 x 15 cm.
- Marooned People, 1967, Oil on board, 100 x 76 cm.
- Image 1, 1978, Lithograph, 155 x 105 cm.
- The Barong and Fire Signs, 1985, Pen and ink on paper, 81 x 64 cm.
- Spiral Dancing and Mythological Figures, 1986, Mixed media on paper, 173 x 123 cm.
- Black and White Mandala, 1987, Collage and assemblage on canvas, 155 x 266 cm.
- The Return of Sophia – Kali's Alter- St Peters Cathedral, 1994, Mixed media installation.
- Sophia and the 7 Serpents – The Church of St John the Evangelist, 1998, Mixed media installation.
- Sophia's Underground Carnival – Brougham Place Uniting Church, 2000, Mixed media installation.

== Select exhibitions ==
solo:

- Hawthorn City Art Gallery, Melbourne, AUS (1980)
- Wagga Wagga City Art Gallery, Wagga Wagga, AUS (1981)

group:

- Victorian Printmaking Travelling Exhibition (All States of Australia 1981)
- Whitechapel Gallery, London, UK.
- Contemporary South Australian Painting, Art Gallery of SA, AUS (1988)
- Victoria & Albert Museum, London, UK (1992).

== Select collections ==
- National Gallery of Australia
- Art Gallery of New South Wales
- Art Gallery of South Australia
- National Gallery of Victoria
- Art Gallery of Western Australia
- Queensland Art Gallery
- Museum and Art Gallery of the Northern Territory
- Queen Victoria Museum and Art Gallery
- Tasmanian Museum and Art Gallery
- Wagga Wagga City Gallery
- Araluen Art Centre
- Swan Hill Regional Gallery
- Christensen Foundation
