= Tony Maskill =

Australian photographer

Tony Maskill is an Australian photographer.

== Biography ==
Tony Maskill was born in 1948 in Manchester, England. He worked as the hotel photographer in the Southern Cross in Melbourne while studying photography at Prahran College of Advanced Education.

== Works ==
Maskill exhibited at the Kodak Gallery and his work was published in the Australian Centre for Photography publication New photography Australia: a selective survey in 1974 edited by Graham Howe. He taught photography at Box Hill College.
