= Polly Borland =

Australian photographer (born 1959)

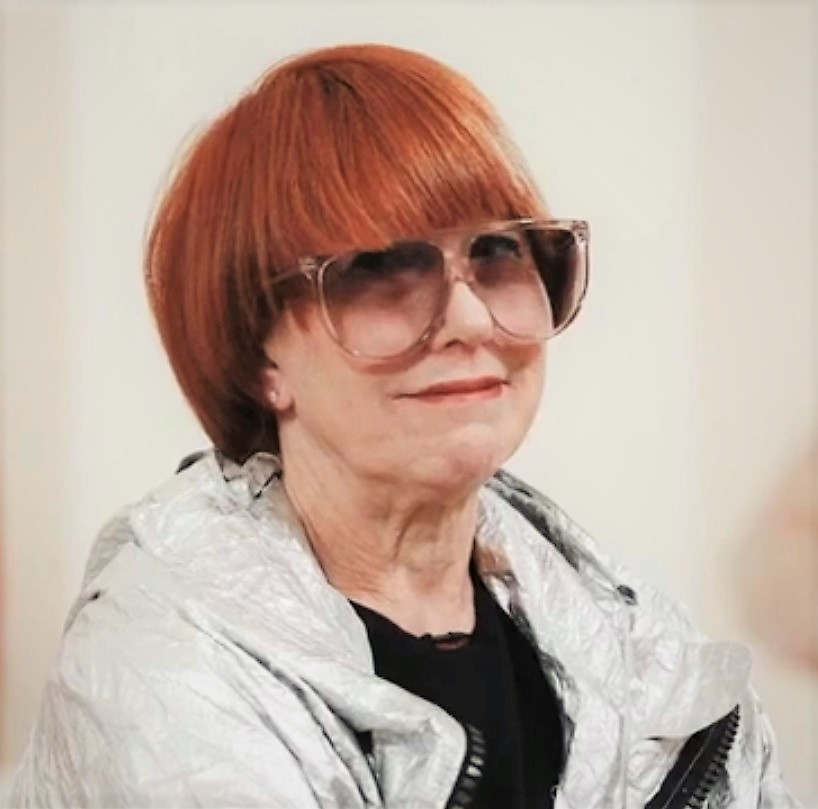
- Borland in 2018
- Born: 1959 (age 66–67); Melbourne, Victoria, Australia
- Occupation: Photographic Artist
- Years active: c. 1980–present
- Spouse: John Hillcoat
- Parent: Kevin Borland

Polly Borland (born 1959) is an Australian photographer who formerly resided in England from 1989 to 2011, and now lives in Los Angeles, United States. She is known both for her editorial portraits and for her work as a photographic artist.

== Biography ==
Borland was born in Melbourne where her father gave her a camera with Nikkor lenses when she was 16. She graduated from Prahran College in 1983, where she discovered Diane Arbus, Weegee and, Larry Clark, all of whom influenced her work. On leaving art school, she became a portrait photographer, contributing to the Australian edition of Vogue. Her first solo exhibition was held at the George Paton Gallery in Melbourne in 1984. In 1989, she moved to the United Kingdom where she specialized in stylized portraits and reportage photography. Her work has been featured in newspapers and magazines worldwide.

A number of books on her work and exhibitions have been published. In 2001, her first series The Babies examined the way men can enjoy dressing up as infants, with an essay by Susan Sontag, an introduction by Mark Holborn. In 2008, she produced Bunny, a collection of photographs about English actress Gwendoline Christie. Bunny also features a fairy-tale written by Will Self and a poem by Nick Cave. Smudge (2011) features abstract depictions of three of her friends she uses as models; musician Nick Cave, photographer Mark Vessey and fashion designer Sherald Lambden. All three appear half naked, faces obscured, wearing body stockings, tights, wigs, and other fanciful objects of clothing. In February 2013 the documentary Polly Borland - Polymorphous was released.

Borland was awarded an Honorary Fellowship of the Royal Photographic Society in 2002.

Polly Borland and her husband, director John Hillcoat, live in Los Angeles, California.

== Works or publications ==
=== Books ===
- Borland, Polly; Conrad, Peter; National Portrait Gallery (Great Britain) (2000). Polly Borland: Australians. National Portrait Gallery. ISBN 9781855142824.
- Borland, Polly (2000). The Babies. powerHouse Books. ISBN 978-1-57687-083-9.
- Holborn, Mark (2008). Bunny. Harry N. Abrams. ISBN 978-1-904212-23-2.
- Andreu, Ignacio (2011). Smudge: Polly Borland: exposition, Gloria, Madrid, 2 Diciembre 2010 - 2 Abril 2011. Actar. ISBN 978-84-92861-59-0.
- Martin-Chew, Louise; Borland, Polly; Kubler, Alison (2012). Polly Borland: Everything I Want to be when I Grow Up. University of Queensland Art Museum. ISBN 978-1-74272-048-7.
- Borland, Polly (2013). YOU. Perimeter Editions. ISBN 978-0-9873530-3-0.

=== Articles ===
- Borland, Polly (Summer 2000). "Grog". Granta. 70: 231–262.

=== Filmography ===
- Polly Borland - Polymorphous
- MOCAtv - IO Echo "Berlin, It's All A Mess" Directors John Hillcoat & Polly Borland

== Exhibitions and notable works ==
- 1984: Polly Borland, George Paton Gallery, Melbourne
- 1999: The Babies, 1999 Meltdown Festival curated by Nick Cave, Southbank, London
- 1999: one of six Australian photographers exhibited in "Glossy: Faces Magazines Now" at the National Portrait Gallery, Canberra
- 2000: Australians, National Portrait Gallery, London
- 2001: Australians, National Portrait Gallery, Canberra
- 2001: Australians, Monash Gallery of Art, Melbourne
- 2002 The Babies, Anna Schwartz Gallery, Melbourne
- 2008: Bunny, Murray White Room, Melbourne; featuring Gwendoline Christie
- 2008: Bunny, Michael Hoppen Gallery, London; featuring Gwendoline Christie
- 2010: Smudge, Murray White Room, Melbourne
- 2011: Smudge, AB Gloria, Madrid
- 2011: Smudge, Other Criteria, London
- 2011: Smudge, Paul Kasmin Gallery, New York City
- 2012: Everything I want to be when I grow up, University of Queensland Art Museum, Queensland
- 2012: Pupa, Murray White Room, Melbourne
- 2013: YOU, Paul Kasmin Gallery, New York
- 2014: Wonky, The Australian Centre of Photography, Melbourne
- 2014: YOU, Murray White Room, Melbourne

Borland's work has also been exhibited at the Australian Centre for Photography, Sydney; The Auckland Triennial, Auckland; GASK, Gallery of the Central Bohemian Region, Czech Republic; the Scottish National Portrait Gallery, Edinburgh; The Institute of Modern Art, Brisbane; MONA, Tasmania, and the N.S.W. Gallery of Art.

Borland's portrait of Queen Elizabeth II, was commissioned by Buckingham Palace to commemorate her golden jubilee in 2002, is unusual for its brightness and its intimate proximity to Her Majesty. It was exhibited at London's National Portrait Gallery and at Windsor Castle.

Her work is included in the March 2020 Adelaide Biennial of Australian Art at the Art Gallery of South Australia, which is titled "Monster Theatres".

== Awards and nominations ==
=== ARIA Music Awards ===
The ARIA Music Awards is an annual awards ceremony that recognises excellence, innovation, and achievement across all genres of Australian music. They commenced in 1987.

Year	Nominee / work	Award	Result	Ref.
1996	Polly Borland and John Hillcoat for "Sit on My Hands" by Frente!	Best Video	Nominated	
