= Merris Hillard =

Australian printmaker and photographer

Merris Estelle Hillard (born 7 March 1949) is an Australian printmaker and photographer, born in Sydney Australia.

== Early life and education ==
Merris began her Bachelor of Fine Arts at RMIT University in Melbourne in 1969, majoring in painting. She graduated in 1971 and went on to study printmaking at the Prahran College of Advanced Education in 1972. She graduated with a Diploma of Fine Art (Printmaking) in 1975.

In 1973 she began working in the Pathology Department at the Royal Women's Hospital in Melbourne as a medical artist and photographer. She also taught painting in her own studio and various centres.

== Exhibitions ==
- Western Pacific Print Biennale: 1977
- Statewide Building Society (solo exhibition): 1984
- Wyreena Gallery: 1987

== Prizes ==
- Mornington Peninsula Print Prize: 1974, 1975 and 1982.
- Geelong Print Prize :1974
- Portia Geach Memorial Award: 1974
- Minnie Crouch Prize (Art Gallery of Ballarat): 1975
- Perth Print Prize: 1977
- Blake Prize: 1981
