= Howard Arkley =

Australian artist (1951–1999)

- Born: 5 May 1951; Melbourne, Victoria, Australia
- Died: 22 July 1999 (aged 48); Melbourne, Victoria, Australia
- Education: Prahran College of Advanced Education
- Known for: Airbrush canvas

Howard Arkley (5 May 1951 – 22 July 1999) was an Australian artist. He is known for his airbrushed paintings of Melbourne suburbia.

== Life and career ==
After seeing exhibitions of works by Melbourne artists Sidney Nolan and John Brack, Arkley developed an interest in art. Nolan's use of household materials was particularly inspirational, as was the abstract art Paul Klee and Wassily Kandinsky. Arkley studied at Prahran College of Advanced Education from 1969 to 1972, where he discovered the airbrush, which he subsequently used in his paintings as he desired smooth surfaces.

He staged his first exhibition, aged 24, at Tolarno Galleries, Melbourne, in 1975. Most of his early works were abstract, often depicting patterns or lines created with airbrush. Arkley's works were initially black and white, then he began experimenting with colour. A turning point in Arkley's career was in 1981 when he created Primitive, a mural, which caught the attention of the public. In 1982 he painted a tram for the Victorian Ministry of the Arts.

One of his first pieces, "Le que", was noted in the Fine Arts Falls Collection in 1973.

Craftsman House issued the first monograph; Ashley Crawford's Spray: The Work of Howard Arkley in 1997; a revised edition by Crawford and Ray Edgar was published in 2001. The National Library of Australia explains; "This revised and updated edition explores Howard Arkley's influences and the milieu which nurtured and inspired him - from punk music and feminism to the exuberant art scene of the 1980s. Spray examines his work from its early development through abstraction, the gradual move to figurative iconography, into figuration and landscape."

Arkley opened his final exhibition at the 1999 Venice Biennale, then travelled to London to plan an album cover for Nick Cave. Following London, he flew to Los Angeles, where his exhibition at the Karen Lovegrove Gallery was a sell-out. They then drove to Las Vegas where he married his partner Alison Burton on 15 July. (It was his third marriage; he had previously been married to Elizabeth Gower and Christine Johnston.) They returned to Melbourne on 19 July, and on 22 July 1999, he died of a heroin overdose.

== Legacy ==
Duffy & Snellgrove commissioned Melbourne writer and musician Edwina Preston to produce the first biography; Howard Arkley: Not Just A Suburban Boy was published in 2002. The National Library of Australia describes the book; "Arkley's work has been compared to a visual equivalent of the monologues of Barry Humphries. Arkley was also a wild man. This concise account describes his artistic breakthroughs, his relationship with Nick Cave and The Birthday Party, and the heroin which killed him soon after his talent was recognised around the world. It is the fascinating story of a highly gifted artist who took suburbia seriously."

The National Gallery of Victoria opened a retrospective, Howard Arkley, in November 2006 at the Ian Potter Centre, coinciding with the launch of Carnival in Suburbia: The Art of Howard Arkley, a book written by his brother-in-law Dr John Gregory, a senior lecturer at Monash University.

A play based on the life and art of Howard Arkley was staged as part of the 2014 Melbourne Fringe Festival. Presented by Mutation Theatre, the play explored the psychedelic houses of Arkley's paintings and looked at what inspired him to paint them. It was staged at St Martins Theatre in South Yarra from 23–27 September 2014.
