= UnitingWorld =

Australian church foreign aid charity

The UnitingWorld logo

UnitingWorld is the international aid and partnerships agency of the Uniting Church in Australia, based in Sydney Australia.

As a partner of the Australian Government, UnitingWorld receives funding to implement development and poverty alleviation programs in the Pacific, Asia and Africa.

== History ==
The Uniting Church in Australia was established when most congregations of the Methodist Church of Australasia, the Congregational Union of Australia and most of the Presbyterian Church of Australia united in June 1977. Each of these Churches had established their own overseas mission board by the 1850s: the Methodist Overseas Missions (MOM), the London Missionary Society (LMS) and the Presbyterian Board of Ecumenical Relations and Mission (BOEMAR). At the time of union, these mission boards merged to form the Commission for World Mission, which eventually became Uniting International Mission (UIM).

In July 2000, Uniting Church Overseas Aid (UCOA) was established as a separate aid and community development agency of the Uniting Church in Australia. UCOA and UIM worked in tandem, but under separate mandates; UCOA to deliver development projects and humanitarian aid alongside partner churches; UIM to support church leadership, advocacy and Christian discipleship within partner communities. In 2008, these agencies merged under the name 'UnitingWorld', and the twofold mandate remains.

Today, UnitingWorld works in partnership with 22 overseas church denominations to support more than 250,000 people a year through sustainable community development projects.

== Partnership ==
The three denominations that united to form the Uniting Church in Australia each brought their own historic links with overseas churches and these connections have continued. Uniting Church members were still working in partner churches up until the 1970s, but the decolonization of Oceania and the Asia Pacific and shifts in the theology of mission began to reshape how people engaged with partner churches.

The various churches often decolonized even before national independence, with founding denominations coming to prefer independent indigenous churches over a traditional missionary approach. This allowed relationships between the Uniting Church in Australia and churches overseas to mature from dependency (for leadership, resources and funding) into interdependence and partnership.

== Mission and program areas ==
UnitingWorld's mission is to drive collaboration with the global Church to strengthen its shared ministry and address the causes and consequences of poverty, violence and injustice.

It focuses on five areas: Poverty alleviation, gender equality, leadership, climate change and disaster risk reduction, and emergency response.

Recently, UnitingWorld has been supporting partner churches in the Pacific to develop contextual theologies for development in the areas of gender equality, disaster resilience and climate change, and child protection.

== National Director ==
Dr. Sureka Goringe has been the National Director of UnitingWorld since July 2017.

== See also ==
- Christian Conference of Asia
- Pacific Conference of Churches
- The Wayside Chapel
- UnitingCare Australia
- Wesley Mission
- World Council of Churches
