= Gordon Moyes =

Australian politician (1938–2015)

The Reverend and Honourable Gordon Moyes AC

Member of the Legislative Council of New South Wales
- In office 3 September 2002 – 4 March 2011

Personal details
- Born: Gordon Keith Mackenzie Moyes; 17 November 1938 Melbourne, Victoria, Australia
- Died: 5 April 2015 (aged 76) Sydney, New South Wales, Australia
- Party: Christian Democratic Party (2002 – 2009); Family First Party (2009 – 2011)
- Spouse: Beverley Moyes
- Children: 3 (m); 1 (f)
- Education: University of Melbourne
- Occupation: Christian minister, politician, broadcaster

Gordon Keith Mackenzie Moyes AC (17 November 1938 – 5 April 2015) was an Australian Christian evangelist, broadcaster and politician. From 2002 to 2011, he was a member of the New South Wales Legislative Council, initially representing the Christian Democratic Party until March 2009, and from November 2009 to 2011 was the Family First Party's lone parliamentary representative in New South Wales.

== Early life and career ==
Moyes was born in Melbourne, Victoria, on 17 November 1938. His book When Box Hill was a Village recalls events from his childhood and youth.

He first gained prominence in Australia as host of the weekly television program Turn 'Round Australia and radio program Sunday Night Live with Gordon Moyes.

Prior to becoming superintendent of the Sydney Wesley Mission in 1979, he was an ordained Churches of Christ in Australia minister, serving at Victorian churches in Ascot/Newmarket, Ararat and Cheltenham, while graduating from the University of Melbourne with a Bachelor of Arts in 1961. He became a minister of the Uniting Church minister following his transfer to the Wesley Mission. In December 2005 he resigned after 27 years from his position at Wesley Mission, handing over to Keith Garner.

== Parliamentary career ==
Moyes was appointed by the Christian Democratic Party (CDP) to take Elaine Nile's place in the New South Wales Legislative Council in 2002 following her resignation. Moyes subsequently stood for the CDP at the 2003 state election and was elected in his own right.

In 2004, Moyes started questioning CDP leader Fred Nile's leadership after Nile's return to state politics following his unsuccessful attempt to win a seat at the 2004 federal election. Despite his previous support for Nile, Moyes argued that Nile's anti-homosexual, anti-abortion and anti-Muslim focus should be altered and that greater emphasis be placed on environmental issues. Tensions between the two men escalated following the 2007 election, when Nile was re-elected to the Legislative Council.

In 2007, the president of the Legislative Council, Meredith Anne Burgmann, retired from public service and the council sought a replacement. Tensions flared when both Moyes and Nile applied for the position. Nile subsequently withdrew his application and nominated Moyes at Moyes' behest. Peter Primrose was confirmed as president on 8 March 2007, Moyes having received only two votes, Nile's and his own. After Nile was made Assistant Deputy President on 28 June 2007 and then Assistant President 28 November 2007, Moyes began to publicly attack Nile.

In December 2007, Moyes said that Nile was going against his own party executive to oppose Islamic schools, saying that it was policy "made on the run" by Nile and was "certainly not democratic in its methodology or Christian in its theological application". He called for Nile to be replaced as party leader. In September 2008, Moyes said that Nile was too old to be a viable leader, accusing him of being "a pathetic figure" who was a "loner" with "no peers or friends". He also requested that his parliamentary office be moved, saying that his staff had been subjected to bullying and harassment.

In February 2009, Nile wrote in his monthly newsletter that he regretted allowing Moyes to take his wife's place upon her retirement "because of his disloyalty and divisive actions and his frequent support of the Greens". Moyes stated that the "Greens" were "far more Christian". In March 2009, the members of the Christian Democratic Party voted to expel Moyes. Moyes responded by stating that the Party was "hypocritical", "anti-democratic" and exhibited "extreme fundamentalism". Moyes chastised party members for their literal interpretation of the Judeo-Christian Bible and made a point telling the Sydney Star Observer that the CDP stance against homosexuality was un-Christian.

Moyes continued in parliament as an independent before joining the Family First Party in November 2009. On 26 March 2011, Moyes failed in his attempt to be re-elected to the Legislative Council at the 2011 New South Wales election.

== Other details ==
Awarded a number of honorary degrees, Moyes was awarded a Doctor of Divinity (honoris causa) from the California Graduate School of Theology in 1985, a Doctor of Laws (honoris causa) also from the California Graduate School of Theology in 1989 and a Doctor of Letters (honoris causa) from Milligan College, Tennessee, also in 1989.

Moyes was appointed a Companion of the Order of Australia on 26 January 2002 for service to the community in the delivery and expansion of social welfare and outreach services through the Wesley Mission, for fostering networks and partnership arrangements with other agencies to make services more widely available, and to religion. He has also received the honours of Member of the Order of Australia (1986), was appointed a Paul Harris Fellow in 1978 by Rotary International, and received the 1986 Australian Father of the Year award. In 1994, Rotary International recognised Moyes with the president's "distinguished service" award.

Moyes lived in Tumbi Umbi on the New South Wales Central Coast. He died on 5 April 2015 in Sydney.
