= Pran Central =

Heritage listed building in Victoria, Australia

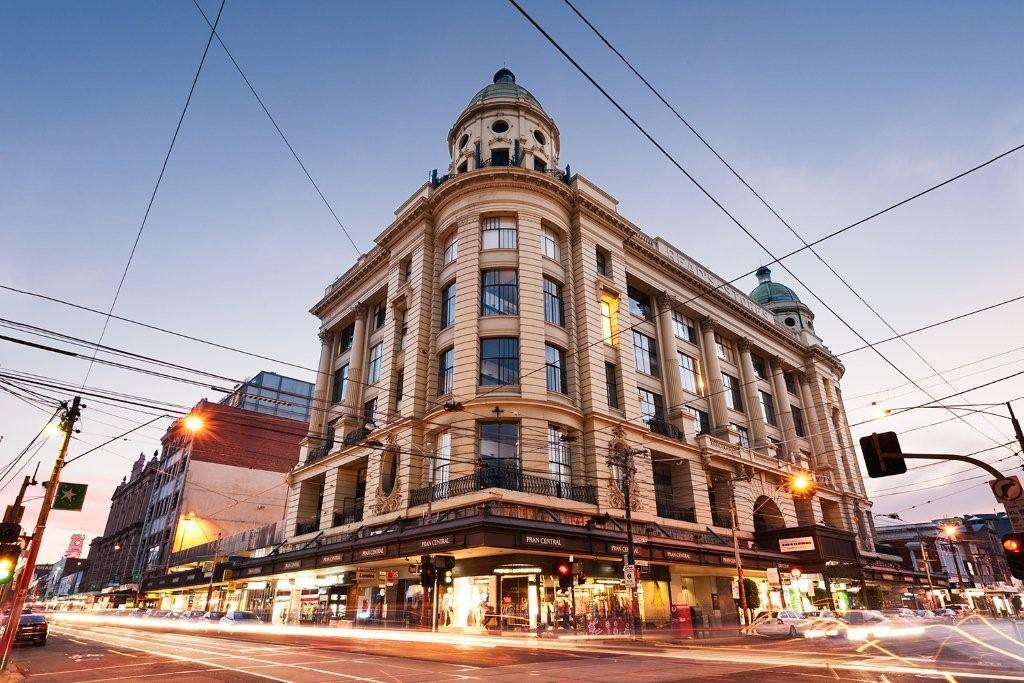
- Pran Central, as viewed from Chapel Street
- Interactive map of the Pran Central area
- Former names: Read's Stores

General information
- Status: Completed
- Type: Retail shopping centre; Residential accommodation
- Architectural style: Edwardian baroque
- Location: 325 Chapel Street, Prahran, Victoria, Australia
- Coordinates: 37°50′51″S 144°59′37″E
- Current tenants: Anchor tenants: Australia Post; ANZ Bank; Kaya Health Club; Prahran Market Clinic
- Opened: 1915
- Renovated: 1978; 1999
- Renovation cost: A$60 million
- Owner: Precision Group

Technical details
- Floor count: 7
- Floor area: 5,350 square metres (57,600 sq ft)

Design and construction
- Developer: Charles Moore & Company
- Designations: National Trust of Australia (Victoria): Chapel Street Precinct

Renovating team
- Architect: SJB Architects

Pran Central is a heritage-listed seven storey Edwardian Baroque style former department store, built in 1915 for Read, comprising a shopping centre with apartments above. The building is located on the corner of Chapel Street and Commercial Road in the well-known retail precinct of Prahran, a suburb in the city of Melbourne, Victoria, Australia.

The shopping centre occupies the lower ground, ground floor and first floor mezzanine, with approximately 30 specialty stores along with a food court.

== History ==
The 1915 seven-storey building is notable for its Edwardian baroque architecture, parapets and dual domes. The National Trust of Australia (Victoria) has listed the building as being of regional architectural, historical and social importance.

Jacob Wayman Read operated a successful drapery business in Chapel Street from 1886. In 1903 he partnered with the prosperous Adelaide retailer Charles Moore and Company, establishing a shop just south of the Commercial Road intersection next to the Prahran Hotel on the south west corner. Moore appears to have combined their names into Chas M. Read's. The business rapidly expanded with a larger three level building, then expanded to the south and took over part of the hotel by 1909. The business then took over the hotel and built the current large building, opening late 1914. Designed by Sydney Smith & Ogg, it was intended to replace the earlier store to the south with a matching extensions, but this was never built.

The building housed what was reputed to be the largest suburban department store in Australia in 1956.

After the store closed, the lower storeys were converted into a shopping centre named Prahran Central in 1978 as part of a major redevelopment effort by John Gandel and Maurice Alter. It then became Pran Central after further redevelopment in 1999. Some grand columns and coffered ceilings of the interior were retained.

Lang Walker acquired the property in 1999 for $22 million, and carried out a $60 million upgrade. The shopping centre was refurbished and the upper six floors converted from office space into luxury apartments, including two added floors under a curved roof. SJB Architects won the 2004 City of Stonnington Urban Design Award for Best Heritage Design, Alterations and Additions/Restoration for the upgrade to the Pran Central Apartments. In 2006 the shopping centre was purchased by Precision Group, from Lang Walker for $34.5 million.

== Gallery ==
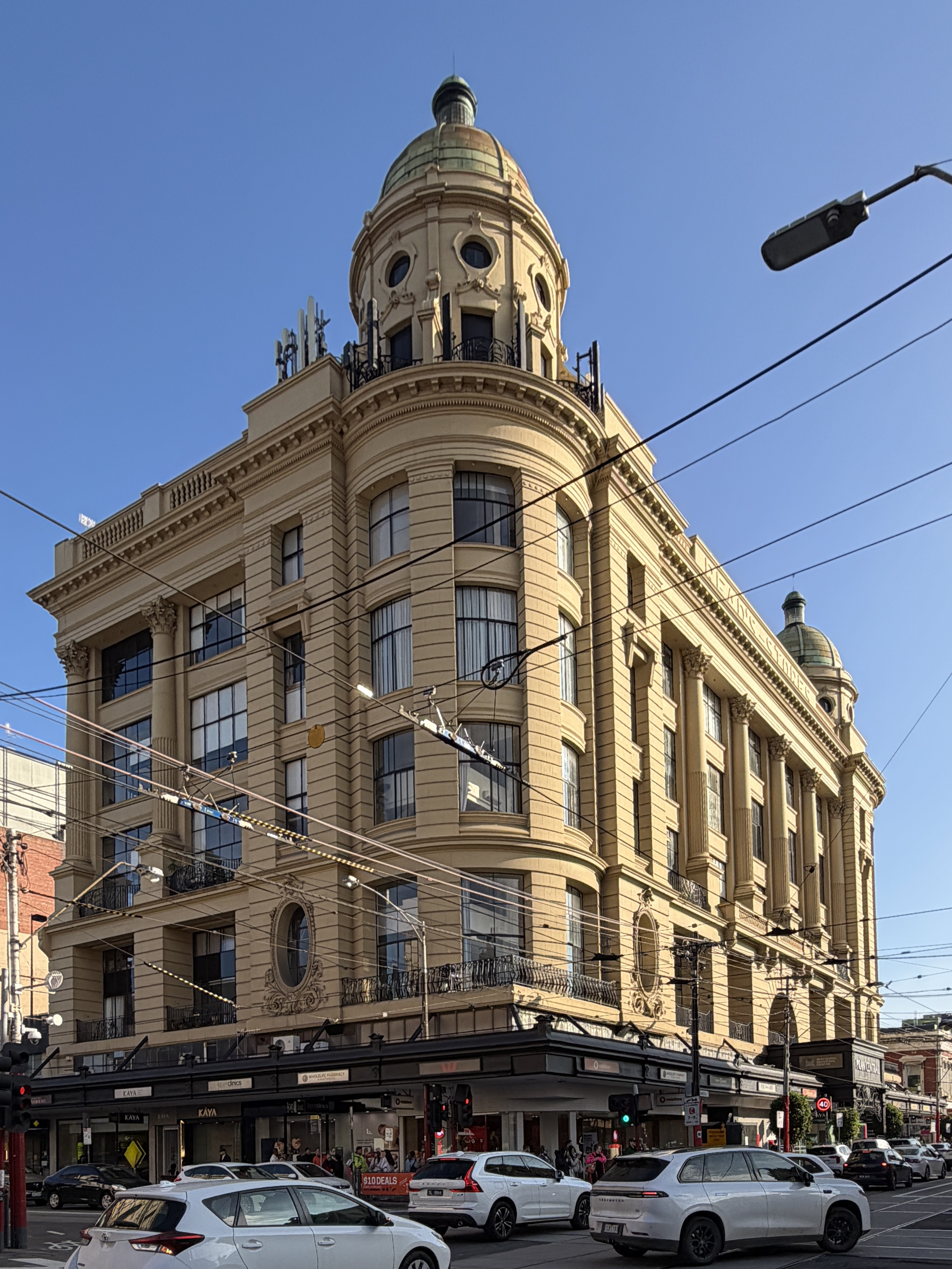
From the corner, 2026

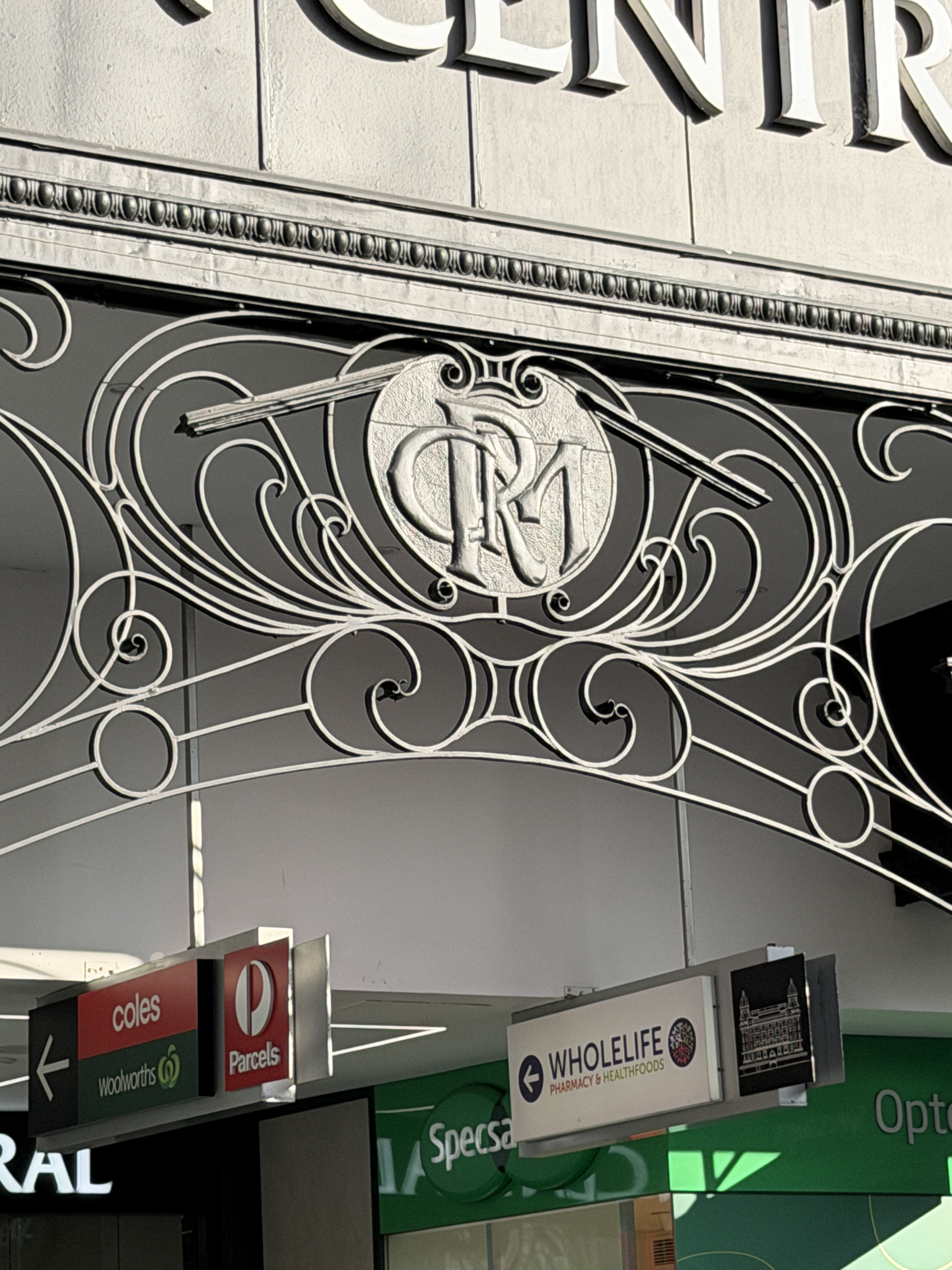
Original signage

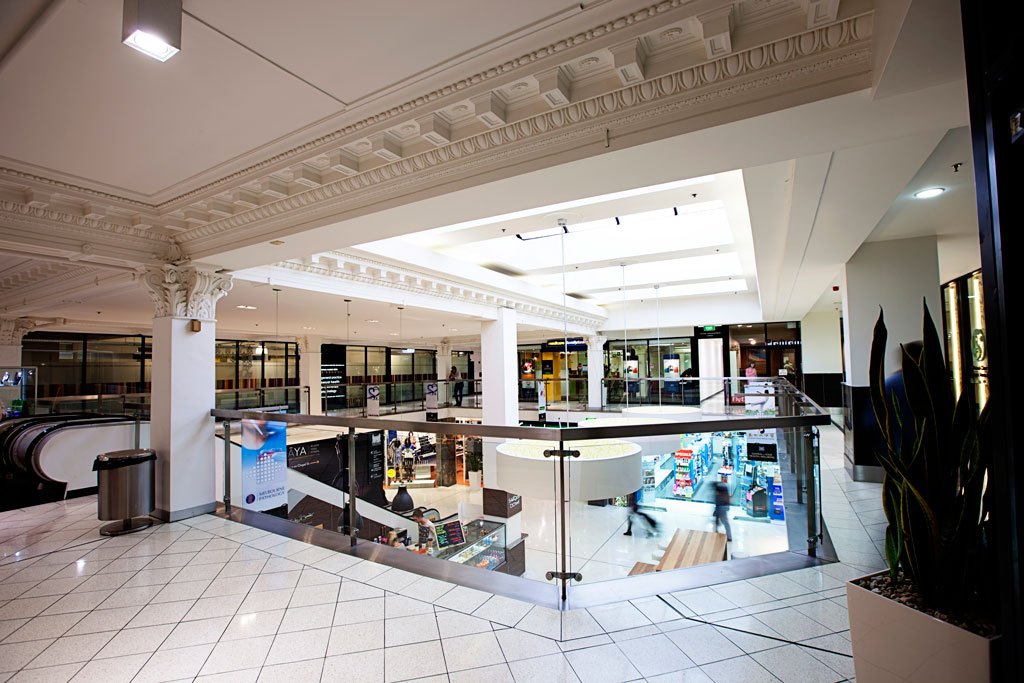
The mezzanine level

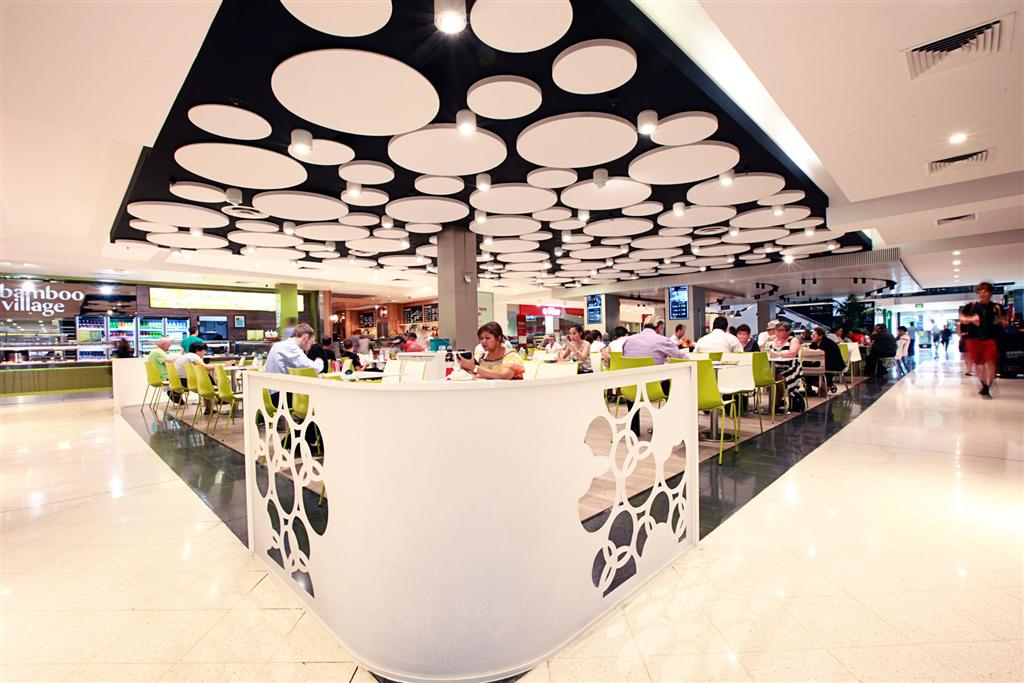
The food court

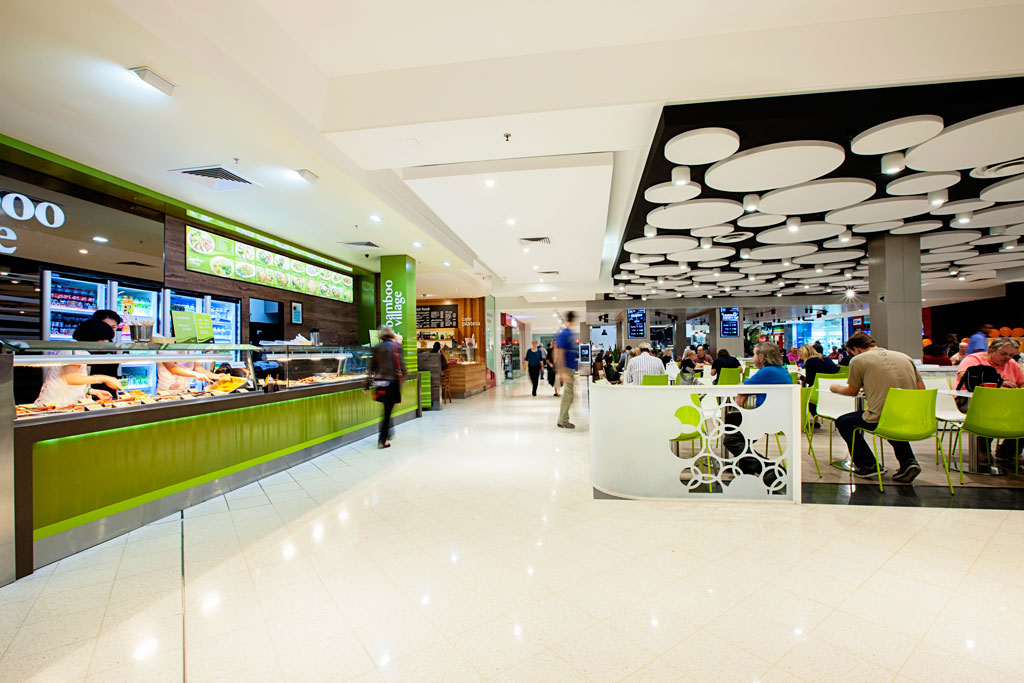
The retail mall

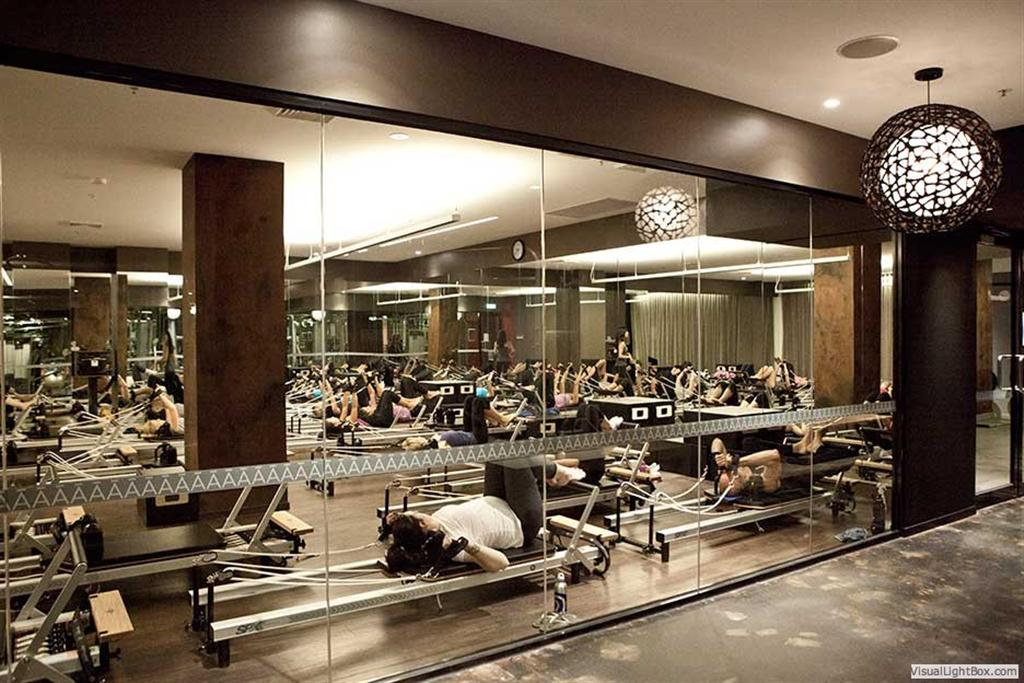
Thel Kaya Health Club located within the building

== See also ==
- Charles Moore and Co.
