= Prahran Arcade =

Historic building in Prahran, Victoria, Australia

Coordinates: 37°50′56″S 144°59′40″E

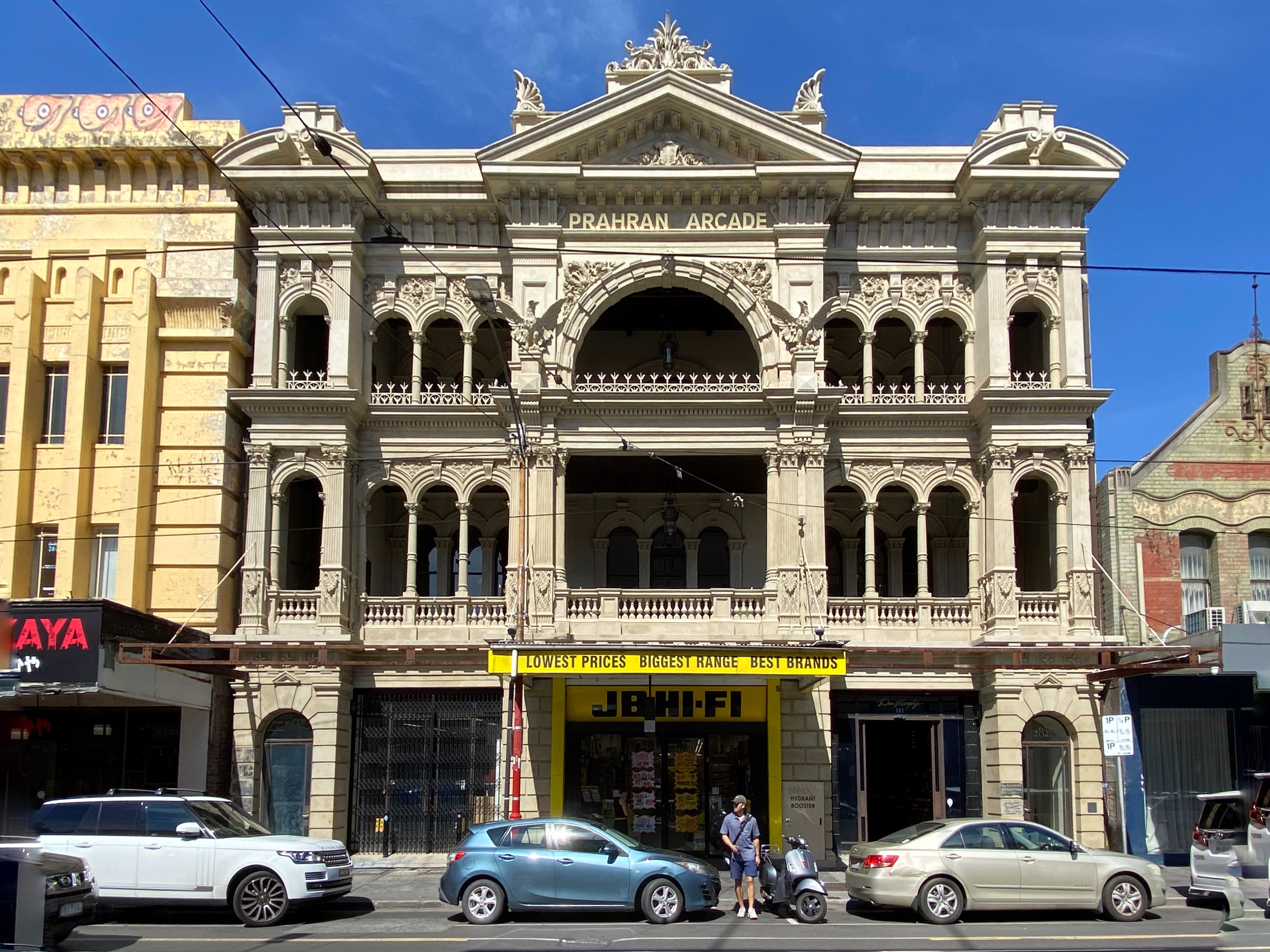
Prahran Arcade in 2023

The Prahran Arcade, located at 282 Chapel Street, Prahran, is one of the most opulent Victorian era commercial buildings in Melbourne, Australia. Opening in 1890, it is the only grandly scaled arcade outside the central city, and has had many notable occupants.

== History ==
Chapel Street Prahran was a growing inner suburban shopping strip during the 'land boom' of the 1880s, and Mrs Elizabeth Delaney, a rare female property developer, invested in a large arcade building nearly opposite the Prahran Town Hall. There was also an hotel upstairs, with about 30 bedrooms looking into the arcade, a large dining room occupying the first floor front, a billiards room and Victorian Turkish baths. It opened with great fanfare on 31st July 1890.

The architect was George McMullen, who was newly arrived from South Australia, and did not practice much in Melbourne. Both he and Mrs Delaney were early victims of the 1890s crash, which soon left much of the arcade untenanted - he was declared insolvent by December 1890, and decamped for WA where he revived his career in the 1900s, and she lost the arcade to the bank within 12 months. A contributing factor for the failure was that unlike other arcades which connected shopping streets, this arcade only led to a residential side street. An historic photograph probably from the early 1890s shows the restaurant, Turkish baths and billiard rooms up for lease, as well as 'a few shops cheap', and the National Trust research notes that in the 1890s many shops remained untenanted.

From the beginning, the arcade was occupied as much by businesses as retailers. Early tenants included Delany and Co., estate agents, the Prahran School of Art, W. Price's oyster saloon and James Wignall's ham shop. By the turn of the century, E. J. Dixon and Sons, auctioneers and estate agents, occupied many shopfronts, along with Inchley Brothers' music warehouse. Later occupiers included the Theosophical Society (Ibis Lodge) and the Suburban Fuel Men's Association. It was revamped as ‘the Centreway’ in the 1920s with new internal shopfronts.

At some point the tall mansard roofs were removed, and the ground level altered with new shopfronts, and a cantilevered verandah added.

In 1952, wine merchant Dan Murphy started out in the basement, then took over the whole building in 1968. He painted the facade in beige and brown, and installed a bistro and pizza bar in the arcade, with seating in the open space. That soon gave way to the display of boxes of bulk beer wine and spirits, and the removal of the shopfronts in the arcade. In 1978 he rented the former hotel dining room upstairs to artist Howard Arkley, who gained fame in the early 1980s, and from 2008-2016 the same space was occupied by artist David Bromley.

Dan Murphy's went on to become the major retailer of beer and wine in Melbourne, but left the arcade location in about 2000, and music and electronics retailer JB Hifi took over the space. A specialist Dan Murphy wine outlet returned to the basement in 2016, and in 2025 JB HiFi left. As at December 2025, Dan Murphy's is back in the building with a retail outlet on ground level. Kon Starzynski bought the building in 2005, and funded the complete restoration of the facade in 2021-22, which by then was severely decayed; the work won an Architect's Institute award for heritage for RBA Consultants. The first floor front hotel dining room was also restored as a function venue, opening in 2021 as Sophia.

== Architecture ==
The three storey street facade features elaborate decorative elements all executed in cement render, drawing from a range of Renaissance Revival and Second Empire sources: there is a large arch across the second floor, flanked by eagles and topped by a pediment with an oversize acroterion and flanking antefixae; Corinthian pilasters at first floor level have lower panels of diaperwork and swags, and the end bays are topped by broken pediments. As Heritage Victoria notes, the "profusion of controlled elegant detail epitomises the excesses of late 19th century architecture in Victoria." The facade has an unusual amount of three dimensional modelling, with the areas between the wider central section and the end bays being setback from the street boundary, and another unusual detail is that the facade runs across an open balcony across both upper floors, adding to the impression of depth. Inside, the partly glazed roof of the arcade is supported by arched iron trusses with decorative cast iron, and a pilastered blind upper storey, and a first floor of arched windows opening to the former hotel rooms. Each end wall features a large fanlight window.

== Gallery ==
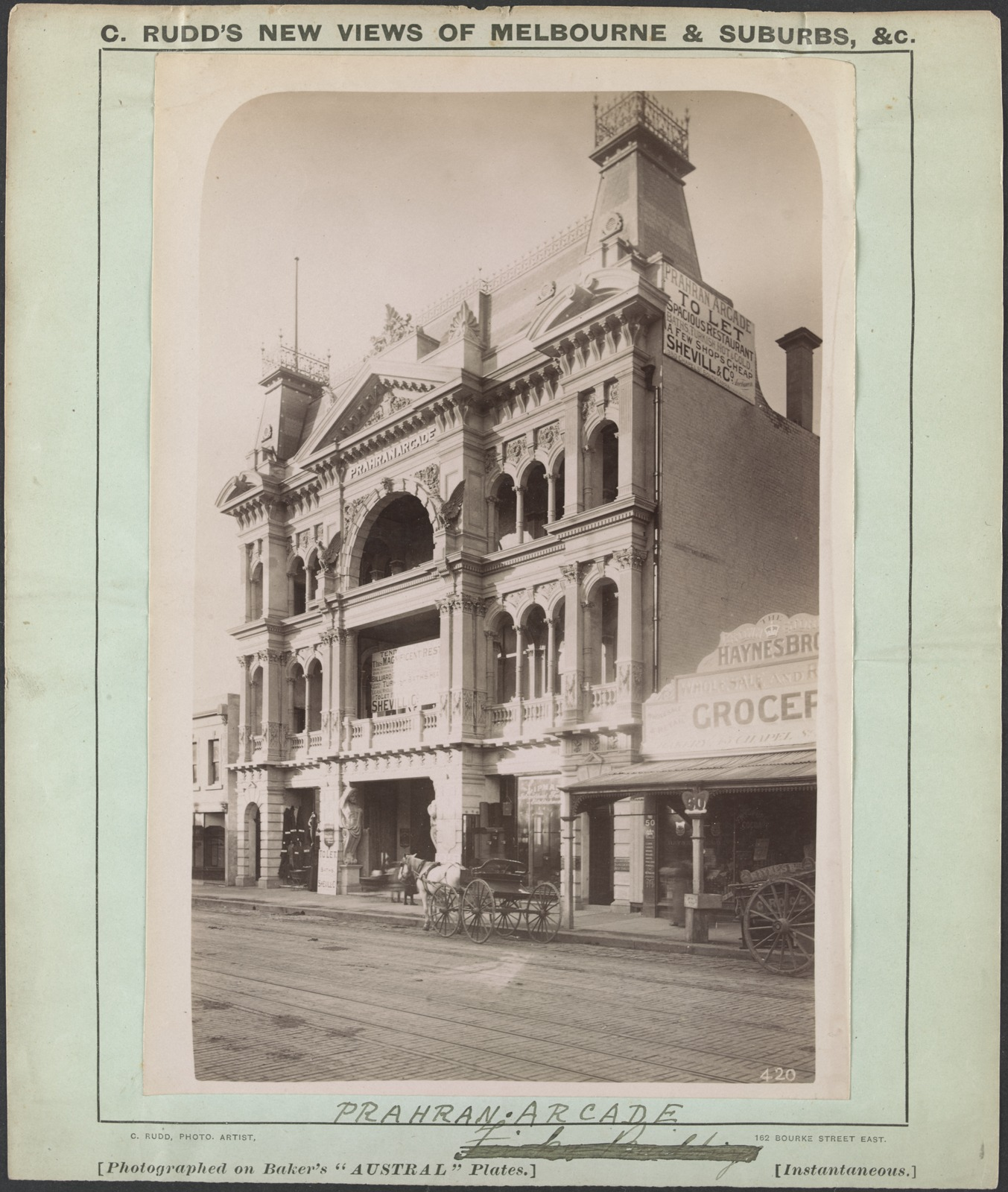
Prahran Arcade in the 1890s

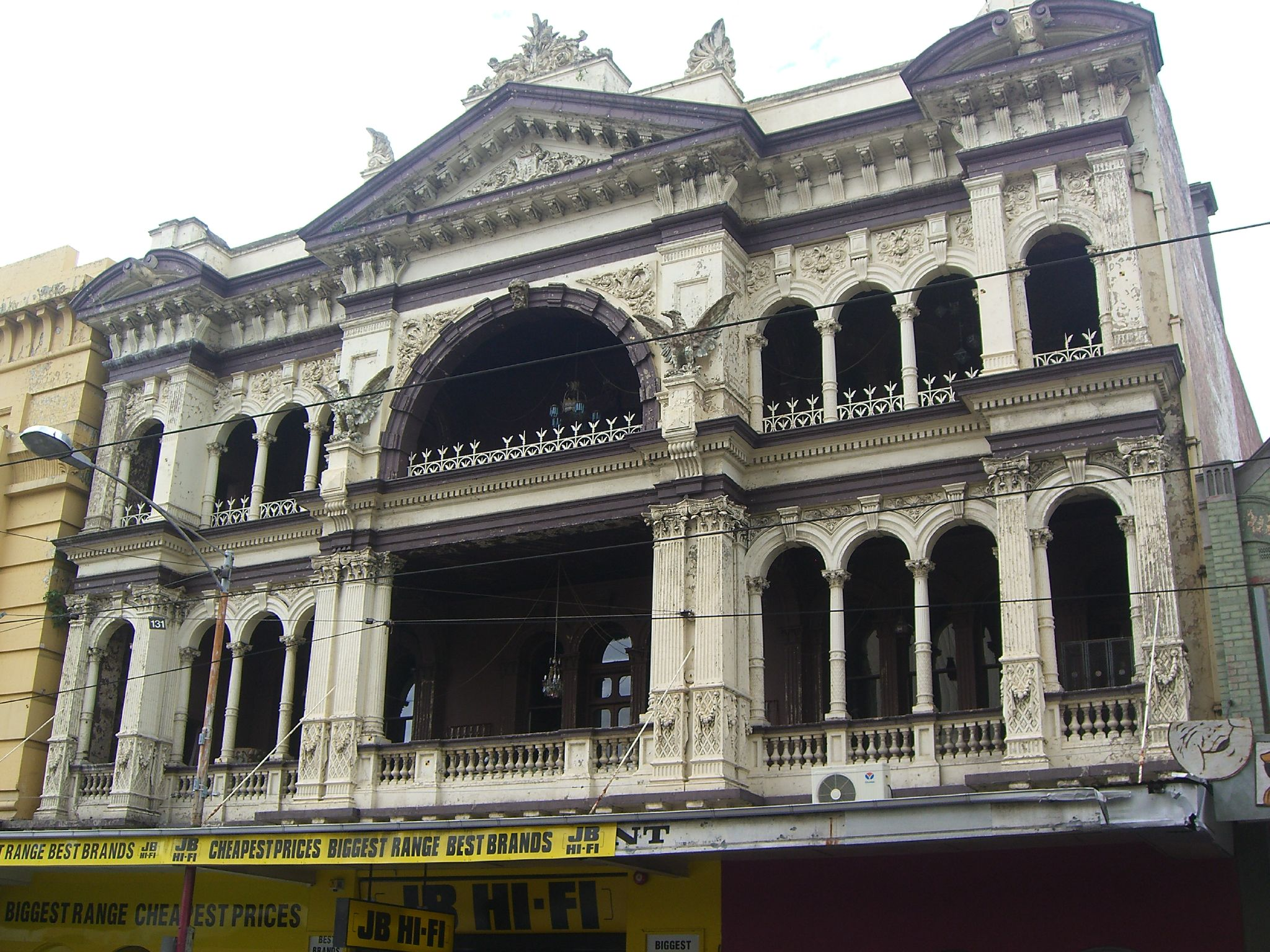
Facade before restoration, 2008

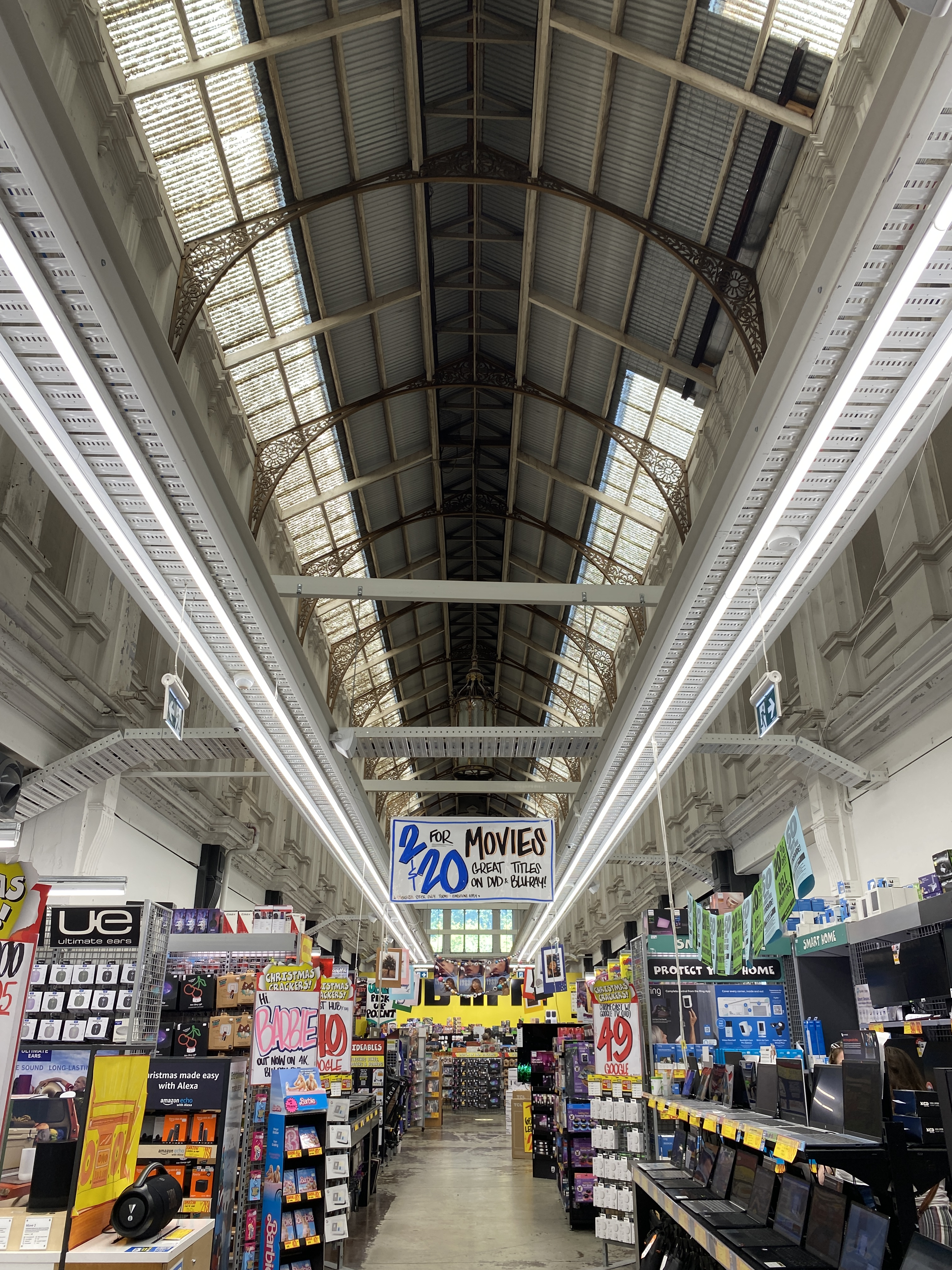
Prahran arcade interior, 2023

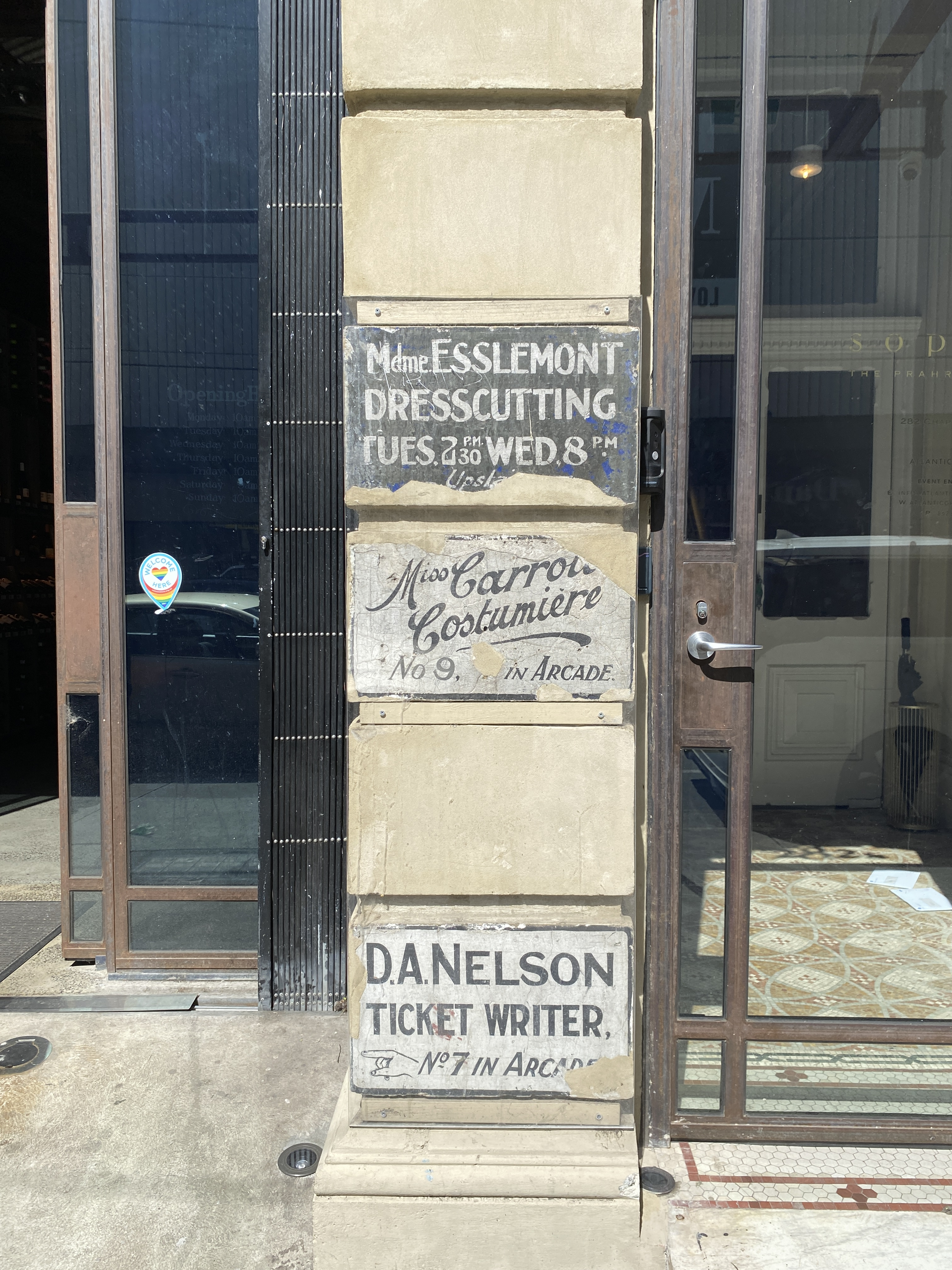
Historic signage revealed next to the entrance, 2023
