= Charles Moore and Co. =

Australian department store chain

- Type: Private company
- Industry: Retail department store
- Founded: 1884; 142 years ago
- Founder: Charles Moore
- Defunct: c. 1980; 46 years ago
- Headquarters: Adelaide, South Australia, Australia

Charles Moore
- Born: c. 1858 near Derry, Ireland
- Died: 30 September 1916 (aged 57–58)
- Resting place: Brighton Cemetery
- Occupations: Merchant; philanthropist
- Years active: 1881-1916
- Known for: Charles Moore and Co.
- Spouse: Jane Cocks Carty
- Children: 4 sons; 3 daughters

Charles Moore and Co. was an Australian retail company based in Adelaide, South Australia, best known for operating the department stores Moore's in Adelaide, Charles Moore's in Perth, and Read's in Prahran. It was founded by Irish-born businessman Charles Moore (c. 1858 – 30 September 1916).

== History ==
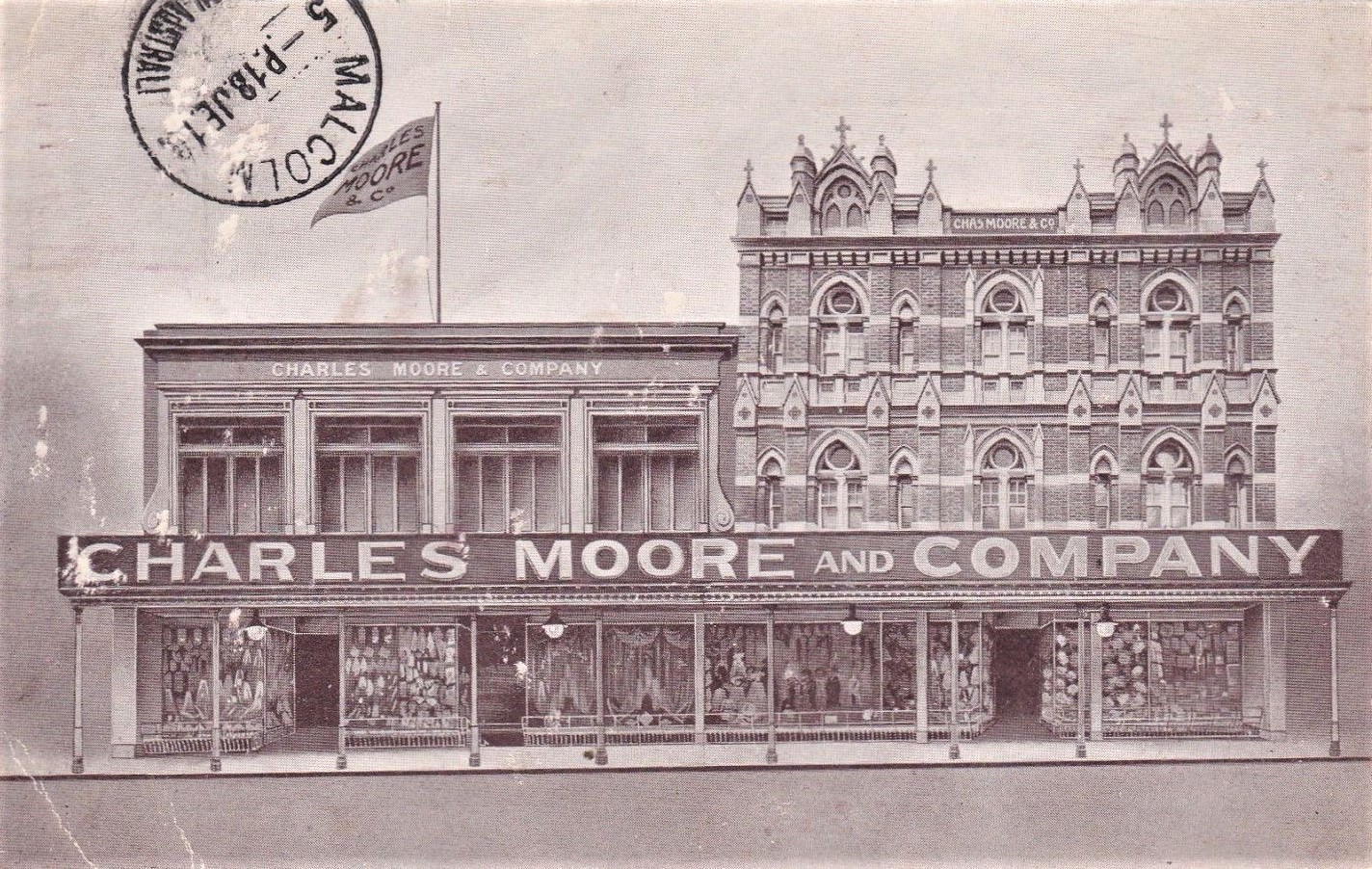
Charles Moore and Company, Hay Street, Perth, 1910

=== Charles Moore ===
Charles Moore was born near Derry, in the north of Ireland. He emigrated to Adelaide around 1881 and for a time worked for John Martin's in Rundle Street, then for the wholesalers Matthew Goode & Co He struck out on his own account by opening a store in 64–74 Gouger Street, later the site of Peoplestores Ltd., on 9 April 1884. In 1905 this store moved to larger premises on the Gouger Street market site.

He took over Peter Smith and Co.'s "Sandringham House" (previously "Gault's") at 16–18 Rundle Street and reopened it as the "Coliseum" in 1898, managed by F. C. Catt, who later had his own Rundle Street store. This shop closed in December 1909 after water leaking from the fifth floor percolated through the building, resulting in extensive damage to stock and fittings. This occurred just four years after the store had been enlarged by the addition of another two storeys. It became Donaldson and Andrews (later Donaldson's), then in 1933 Glasson's, which was taken over by Myers in 1938.

He opened a branch in the boom town of Kadina (on the corner of Graves and Hallett Streets) in 1887. By 1891 he also had stores in Eudunda and Balaklava in country South Australia. By 1893 a store in Manoora was being advertised, but was dropped by 1895. From 1900 only the Kadina shop was advertised, and that closed by 1981.

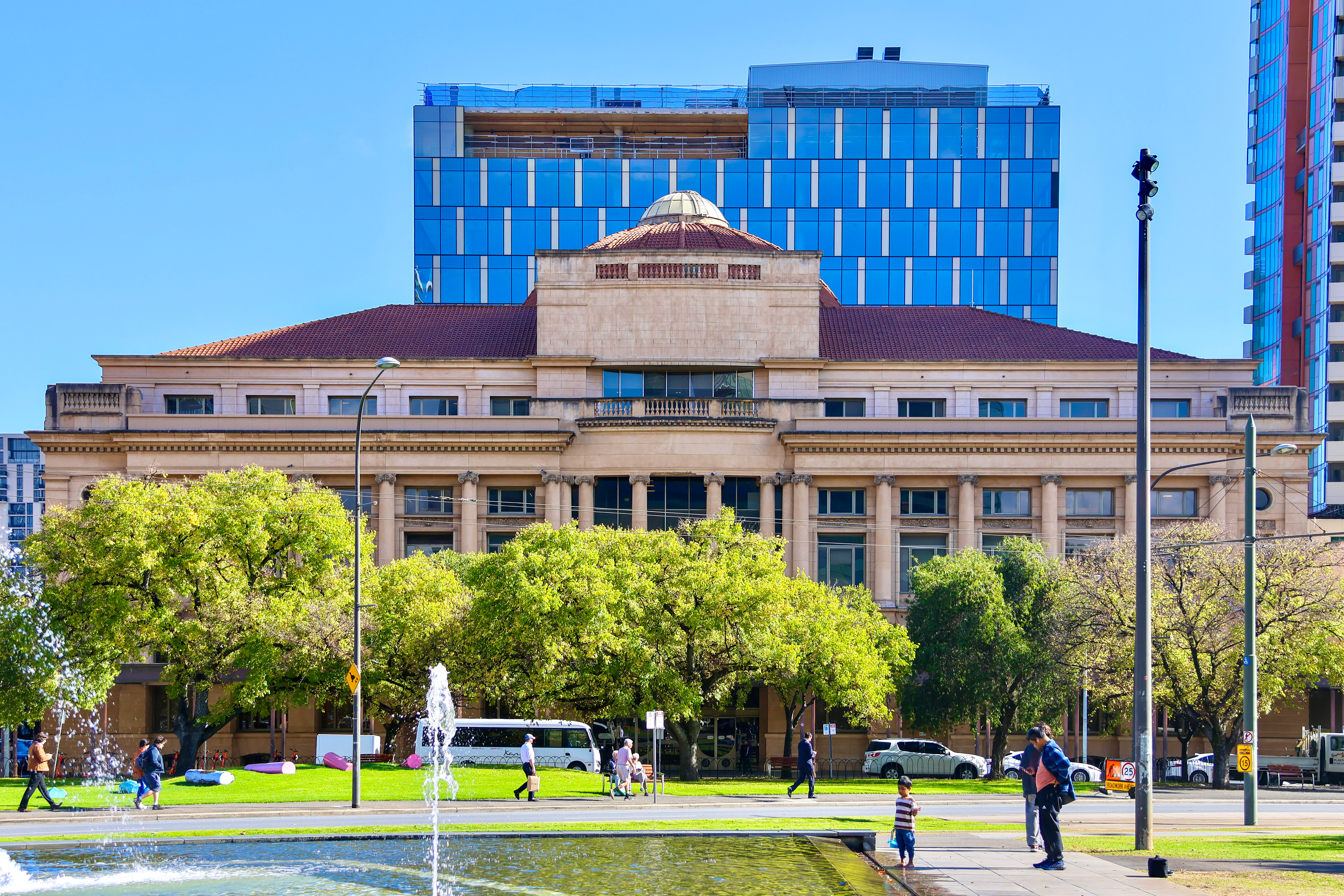
"Moore's on the Square" (now Sir Samuel Way Building)

Moore was a leading figure in the Central Traders' Association, which represented businesses around Grote and Gouger streets, bravely making major investments away from the major retail precinct of Rundle, Hindley and Grenfell streets.

In 1914 he opened a new palatial store on the west side of Victoria Square between Grote and Gouger Streets, designed by architects Garlick & Jackman. No expense was spared in providing a maximum of display area behind large plate glass windows, generously lit by a huge leadlight cupola and extensive artificial lighting. A feature was a grand marble staircase leading to the first floor. The store was officially opened by the Mayor of Adelaide, Isaac Isaacs, on 29 August 1916. It became known as "Moore's on the Square" among Adelaideans.

On 2 March 1948 Moore's was gutted by fire; all that remained was some ground floor structures, the external shell, and the staircase. The shop was rebuilt under the architects Garlick, Jackman and Gooden and business returned until a gradual decline in the 1970s. In 1979 the store was sold to the South Australian Government and was later transformed into a major law courts building containing some 26 courtrooms, library and administration. It was named the "Sir Samuel Way Building" by the Governor of South Australia Sir Donald Dunstan in 1983 commemorating the South Australian jurist Samuel Way.

He opened a store "Moore and Gobbett" in Hay Street, Perth, Western Australia in 1895, and bought the "Coliseum" furniture shop, also on Hay Street, but sold it in 1902. By 1899 the shop was advertised as Charles Moore and Co. Moore is particularly remembered in Perth for his advocacy for a children's hospital (founding in 1897 the Children's Hospital Movement) and its generous support.

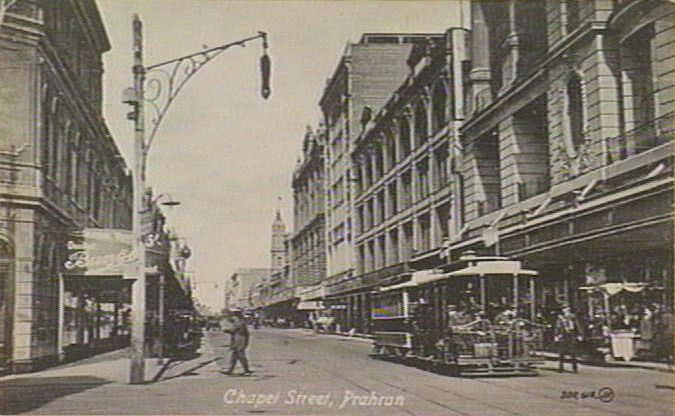
Chapel Street Melbourne c1915. The four storey building second from the right was the Charles Moore and Co. department store (built 1903-1906 prior to the construction of Read's Emporium) which was demolished in the 1960s to make way for single storey carpark.

He was principal partner of the "Charles M. Read" store in Chapel Street, Prahran, and owned the property. and was full owner when his partner Jacob Read died in 1910. In 1956 Read's was Australia's largest suburban store.

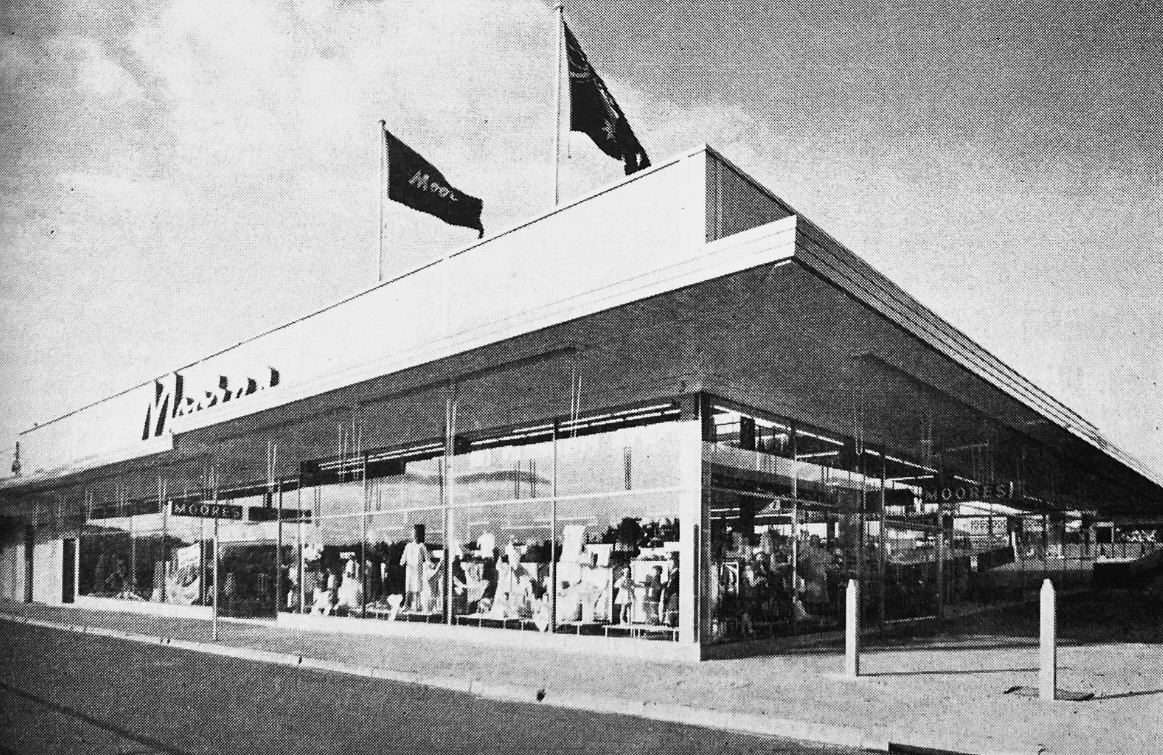
Regional branch of Moores at the Forest Hills Shopping Centre, 1964

Around 1900 Charles and his family moved to Melbourne, living at "Woorigoleen", Clendon Road, Toorak, where he died after a short illness, and was buried at Brighton cemetery. Substantial sums were left to his employees in his will. They owned a nearby property "Warrawee" on the corner of Grange and Struan Roads, where Mrs. Moore lived for a time, and subdivided for sale in 1918. She purchased "Merriwa", A. Rutter Clarke's home, noted for its garden of indigenous plants, on Orrong Road, Toorak in September 1917. From around 1930 until her death she lived at "Tara", also on Orrong Road, the last ten years as an invalid.

== Family ==
Charles Moore married Jane Cocks Carty (1871 – 19 May 1944). They had four sons and three daughters. Jane Carty was born in Dublin, the daughter of the founder of the Band of Hope in Ireland. Both were interred at Brighton Cemetery.

- Charles Carty Moore (ca. May 1895 –) married then lived at Montalto Avenue, Toorak. He was a noted horseman and huntsman. Their son Fred Moore (born ca.1926) was managing director in 1956. Another son, Charles Owen Moore, married Mary Noel Murphy on 14 December 1942.
- Nora married Lawrence "Larry" Heath (–) of Malvern, Victoria on 24 April 1918. His brother was the tennis player Rod Heath. Their home in 1942 was "Brenchley", 213 Orrong Road, Toorak.
- Kenneth George Carty "Ken" Moore (15 March 1899 – ) married Gwen Johnston on 26 August 1931. Gwen was a noted horsewoman, aviator, and daughter of Major-General George Johnston.
- Kathleen Mary "Kitty" ( – 15 December 1949) married [later General] (Walter) Noel Tinsley DSO (24 December 1898 – 1974) on 15 November 1933. They lived at Stradbroke Avenue, Toorak then Glenferrie Road, Malvern.
- Denis Washington Coburn Moore (23 April 1904 – July 1963) was a member of the Stock Exchange and respected economist. He married Dorothy Rogers (a noted angler and horsewoman) on 8 October 1935
- Desmond Carty Moore ( – ) was a lawyer and pastoralist of Marlow Farm, Nar Nar Goon, Victoria. He was noted for his court actions against the Tax Department following a change to the method of taxing woolgrowers. He lived at "Monomeeth", 217 Orrong Road, Toorak.
- Patricia Margaret "Pat" ( – 31 October 1947) married Robert Wylie "Rob" Burns Cuming (5 March 1911 – ) of Minchin Street, Torrensville on 31 October 1931

=== Second generation ===
Charles C. Moore succeeded his father as chief executive officer of Chas. Moore and Co. and was succeeded by a grandson Fred Moore some time before 1956.

Campbell Smith, a nephew of Charles Moore, was General Manager until 1935.

Charles Edward Stuart Smith, another nephew, managed the Charles M. Read store in Prahran from 1902 then managed the Adelaide business then from 1907 to 1930 managed the Perth business. He then worked for another company in Sydney but returned to the Prahran store on the death of his uncle and remained there until 1932.
