= Prahran Mission =

Prahran Mission is a not-for-profit community services organisation in Prahran, a suburb of Melbourne, Australia. It is largely focused on providing services for people living with mental illness, or in economic or social disadvantage. It operates under the auspice of UnitingCare Australia.

== History ==
Prahran Mission is part of the Uniting Church in Australia and provides a range of services to those experiencing mental illness, homelessness and/or economic disadvantage.

Prahran Mission began in 1946 as the Prahran Methodist Mission, operating out of the building it still occupies in Chapel Street. At first it concentrated on charity work such as emergency relief and a low-cost cafe.

When the Uniting Church in Australia was formed from, amongst others, the Methodist Church, Prahran Mission came under the banner of UnitingCare Australia and operated under its guidelines.

On 3 October 2016, Prahran Mission joined with 21 other Uniting Church community service agencies to form a new single organization, Uniting (Victoria and Tasmania) Limited, which provides governance for all founding agencies under a single Board, Uniting (VicTas) Board.

== Services ==
During the 1980s, Prahran Mission started concentrating on the needs of those with mental health issues. Although it kept its traditional community services programs going, new services were specifically catered to those living with mental illness. For example, Prahran Mission began its Second Story program, a psychosocial rehabilitation program, based around participants meeting with a support worker and working towards living independently in the community.

Prahran Mission continued to expand its services, and now provides many different types of services across three catchment areas in Victoria - Bayside, Inner East, and South East. Some of these services are:

- Aged Care, providing Home Care Packages for the elderly
- Diversity & Advocacy, supporting the LGBTQI community
- Emergency Relief and Material Aid
- Engagement Hub, providing meals, support, and free facilities (showers, washing machines) to those in need
- GoodWill Shops, providing low cost clothing and furniture, and retail experience for jobseekers
- Hartley's Community Dining Room, providing low cost meals to all
- JobSupply Personnel, a specialist employment service assisting those who are affected by illness or disability to return to suitable paid work
- Mental Health services, PHaMs or MHCSS (Individual Support Packages), with both services fully government funded (Federal and State, respectively)
- Pastoral Care
- Pro Bono Legal Advice, a free monthly advice service
- Residential Units, with long term housing opportunities
- Vocational and Skills Training, low cost courses open to all
- Voices Vic, supporting people who hear voices.
