= Alfred Rutter Clarke =

Sharebroker

Alfred Rutter Clarke (17 November 1867 – 10 December 1932), generally referred to as "Rutter Clarke" or "A. Rutter Clarke", was an Australian stockbroker and investor whose company Clarke and Co., founded by his grandfather, William Clarke, operated in three states, and specialised in mining ventures.

== History ==
He was born in Prahran, Victoria the son of Alfred Edward Clarke (1843–1913) and his wife Caroline (née Long) (1844–1884) and brought up in the family home, "Royston", Dandenong Road, Malvern, Victoria. He was elected to the newly formed Melbourne Stock Exchange in 1891, its youngest member. Around 1892 he moved to Adelaide, bought a house "Merriwa" on Northcote Tce, Gilberton (which he sold in 1906) and established a sharebroking company there. He returned to Melbourne in 1905 and joined Clarke and Co., which he took over from his father A. E. Clarke in 1908. He was a member of the Stock Exchange committee from 1906 to 1911 and resigned his membership of the Exchange in 1928.

In 1897 he organised the sale of the Ivanhoe mining company.

In 1909 he was a director of the Mararoa mine at Norseman, Western Australia.

He was a director of the Great Boulder Mining Company

== Associates ==
Richard E. P. Osborne (ca.1860 – 24 August 1932) left the Isle of Man in 1868 when his father started work at the Kapunda copper mine, was educated at Whinham College and was a member of the Adelaide Stock Exchange from 1896 to 1924, when he joined the Adelaide office of Clarke and Co. He was a dog judge for the RAHS and lived at Aldgate.

R. E. Wallen was a partner for some time of both E. A. Clarke and A. Rutter Clarke.

F. H. Bathurst was a partner then joined The Argus as finance correspondent.

Geoffrey Rutter Clarke, his son was a partner

A. J. Taylor, previously secretary of the Melbourne Stock Exchange, was a partner.

== Personal ==
On 27 June 1895 Rutter Clarke married Edith Marion Sargood (1867–1952), a daughter of Sir Frederick Sargood. Their children were:

- Geoffrey Rutter Clarke (3 June 1896 – 1971) married Susan May "Susie" Pender of Naracoorte, South Australia on 28 March 1923.
- Kenneth Sargood Rutter Clarke (2 February 1898 – 23 October 1955)
- Audrey (3 April 1903 – 1925)

Mr Rutter Clarke was fond of sport and was a keen cricketer and tennis player. He wrote interesting articles on international cricket and horse racing for newspapers such as The Barrier Miner.

In 1907 he built a magnificent home, "Merriwa" on Orrong Road, Toorak, under architect Walter Richmond Butler, and established a large and exquisitely planned garden (he was a keen gardener, especially of roses) which featured an expanse of indigenous flowering plants unmatched outside Botanical Gardens. In February 1917 the car he was driving on High Street, St Kilda, struck and killed William Fitzsimmons, who had jumped down from the seat of his lorry into the path of the oncoming vehicle. The following September he sold "Meeriwa" to Mrs. Charles Moore, the wealthy owner of Charles Moore and Co. His next home was "Myoora", previously the home of Robert Harper, MLA, close to the Toorak tram terminus. Dame Nellie Melba had been a tenant of this stately mansion for five months in 1902.

His palatial weekender, "Ellerslie" at Mornington, Victoria previously owned by Sir Frederick Sargood, was destroyed by fire in April 1908. Arson was suspected. A new residence was built and the property on 30 acres was sold in 1920.

His last residence was "Braemar", Grandview Grove, Armadale.
