= Chapel Street, Melbourne =

Street in Melbourne, Australia

Chapel Street Victoria
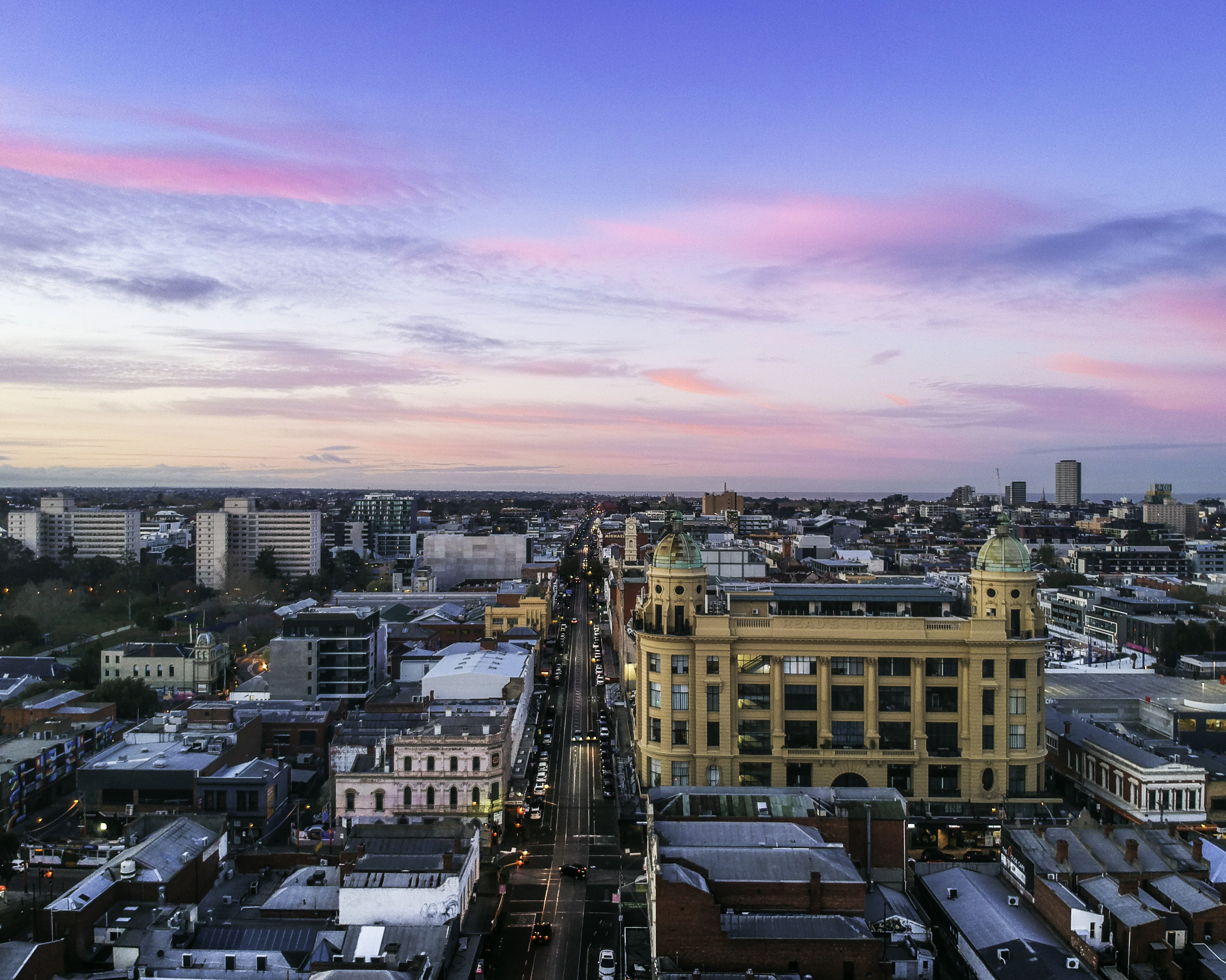
- A drone image looking south down Chapel Street Precinct at sunrise
- Coordinates: 37.834765°S 144.996555°E (North end); 37.872132°S 144.989655°E (South end)

General information
- Type: Street
- Length: 4.2 km (2.6 mi)

Major junctions
- North end: Church Street; South Yarra, Melbourne
- Alexandra Avenue; Toorak Road; Commercial Road; High Street; Dandenong Road; Inkerman Street
- South end: Brighton Road; St Kilda, Melbourne

Location(s)
- LGA(s): City of Stonnington; City of Port Phillip
- Suburb(s): Prahran, Windsor

Chapel Street is a street in Melbourne, Victoria, running along the inner suburbs of South Yarra, Prahran, Windsor, St Kilda and St Kilda East. The street is particularly known for its shopping strip between Toorak Road and Dandenong Road, which is lined with historic shop buildings including a number of large former department stores. A number of other shopping strips also run off Chapel Street itself.

== Route ==
Chapel Street is essentially straight and runs for over 4.14 kilometres along an approximate north–south alignment from the Yarra River in the north to Brighton Road in the south, traversing the south east suburbs of South Yarra, Prahran, Windsor, St Kilda and St Kilda East. Major street crossings are Alexandra Avenue, Toorak Road, Commercial Road, High Street, Dandenong Road, Alma Road, Inkerman Street and Carlisle Street.

Tram route 78 travels along the entire length of Chapel Street, between Richmond and St Kilda. Tram routes 3, 5, 6, 58, 64 and 72 all intersect Chapel Street. The Sandringham line railway stations of South Yarra, Prahran, Windsor and Balaclava are all within 300 metres of Chapel Street.

== History ==
Joseph Crook is believed to have built the first house in Chapel Street in 1849, when the street was known as Fitzroy Road. Chapel Street was named after the first church in Prahran, an Independent (or Congregational) Church, built 100 metres north of Malvern Road on the east side, between 1850 and 1852. The first minister of "The Chapel", as it was known locally, was Rev William Moss. In an address to the Collins Street Independent Church in 1888 the Rev. Moss said, "I may mention that our chapel at Prahran was the only place of worship in the district for over two years and ultimately gave to the business street of that flourishing city its name Chapel Street". The chapel was closed in 1859, used as a school building until about 1883, when it was demolished. The only surviving church in the commercial part of Chapel Street, the Baptist Church, which was built in the 1850s on the corner of Wilson Street, is now the Irish theme pub Bridie O'Reilly's.

A bridge linking Chapel Street and Church Street, Richmond was not built until 1857 and a ferry service operated over the Yarra River. In the 1850s much of the area between Commercial Road and the Yarra River was formed of deep clay deposits which resulted in a number of brickmakers establishing businesses on both sides of Chapel Street. The last of the brickworks, The South Yarra Fire Brick Company continued until the 1980s when it was sold to the Singapore Developer Jack Chia for "The South Yarra Project" development which was to include The Como Centre.

In 1888 Melbourne’s new cable tram service was extended from along Toorak Road down Chapel Street as far as Brighton Road, spurring development. In the 1920s, with the construction of a wider Chapel Street bridge, the service was converted to electric trams, and ran from Richmond in the north, to St Kilda in the south, forming the basis for the current Route 78.

Virtually from its beginning Chapel Street, between Toorak Road and Dandenong Road was a trading and shopping street with flour milling, butchers, bakers, drapers, boot makers, general stores, carpenters, bricklayers, farrier and blacksmiths, chemists and an undertaker. At the start of the 20th century large multi-level emporiums (department stores) began to spring up in the Prahran section of the street. At this point, Chapel Street rivalled the CBD as Melbourne's shopping destination. Emporium development continued right through to the 1930s.

In the 1970s, Pran Central opened as a major shopping mall. In the 1980s, the Jam Factory and Como Centre at the South Yarra end were the biggest developments to effect the character of the street. Gentrification ensured that this end became home to boutique fashion stores.

The passing of the Road Management Act 2004 granted the responsibility of overall management and development of Victoria's major arterial roads to VicRoads: in 2004, VicRoads re-declared the road as Chapel Street (Arterial #5490), beginning at Alexandra Avenue and ending at Toorak Road through South Yarra; the remainder of the road to Brighton Road remains undeclared.

== Sites of interest ==
From the Yarra River heading south:

- The Como Centre is a multi-storey office, retail cinema and hotel complex on the north-east corner of Chapel Street and Toorak Road. It is the headquarters of Channel 10 Television.
- The Jam Factory is a shopping, cinema and entertainment complex on the corner of Garden Street.
- Just off Elizabeth Street is the Prahran Market, a fresh food market which has occupied its present site for over 120 years.
- Chasers built in 1880, has been a prominent live music and dance music venue for over 40 years.
- Commercial Road shopping strip is the centre of one of Melbourne's gay villages.
- The Chapel Off Chapel theatre and gallery venue is at the end of Carlton Street.
- Pran Central at the corner of Commercial Road is a redevelopment of a National Trust classified building into a retail and residential complex with a multicultural food court.
- Prahran Square created from the conversion of the former Cato Street ground-level carpark into a 500 bay underground facility, Prahran Square provides essential public space and will help to drive the economic renewal of the Chapel Street Precinct.
- Greville Street is a small niche shopping strip. A petite Prahran street leads you gently from the hustle of Chapel Street, into a warm village of boutique makers, retailers and artists. Once the epicentre of bohemian culture in Melbourne, Greville Street has kept its boho-chic aesthetic, while welcoming some of Australia's favourite retailers into its collective of independents.
- Prahran Town Hall, on the corner of Greville Street was opened in 1861.
- Prahran Arcade, built in 1890, restored in 2023.
- The Prahran Mission, a community services organisation run by UnitingCare Australia.
- The Prahran campus of Swinburne University is near the south west corner of High Street.
- The first bowling club in Australia, the Melbourne Bowling Club, is situated behind Chapel Street in Union Street. The club was founded on 11 March 1864.
- Artists Lane - running parallel to Chapel Street is Artists Lane (Aerosol Alley to southsiders), a long bluestone alley splattered in street art. The project was initiated by artist Wayne Tindall, who started by painting himself and his wife outside his studio in the laneway before getting other artists involved, with the blessing of the local council. Look for the painted bins and colour-splashed walls.
- The Astor Theatre on the south west corner of Dandenong Road is a Heritage Victoria registered, 1930s art deco cinema which seats over 1,100 people.
- St Michael's Grammar School now incorporates many of the area's old buildings.

== Gallery ==
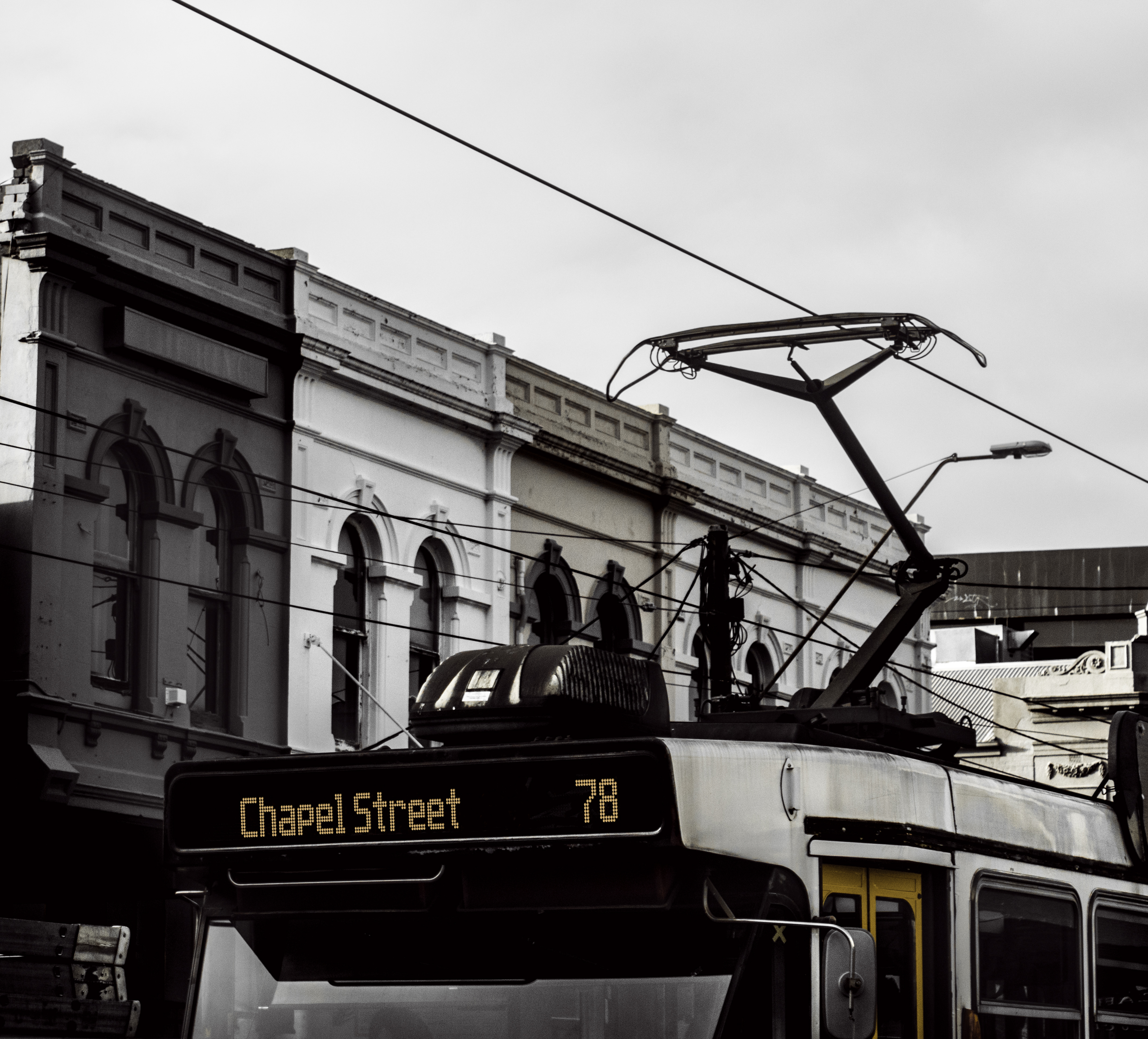
Tram on Chapel Street

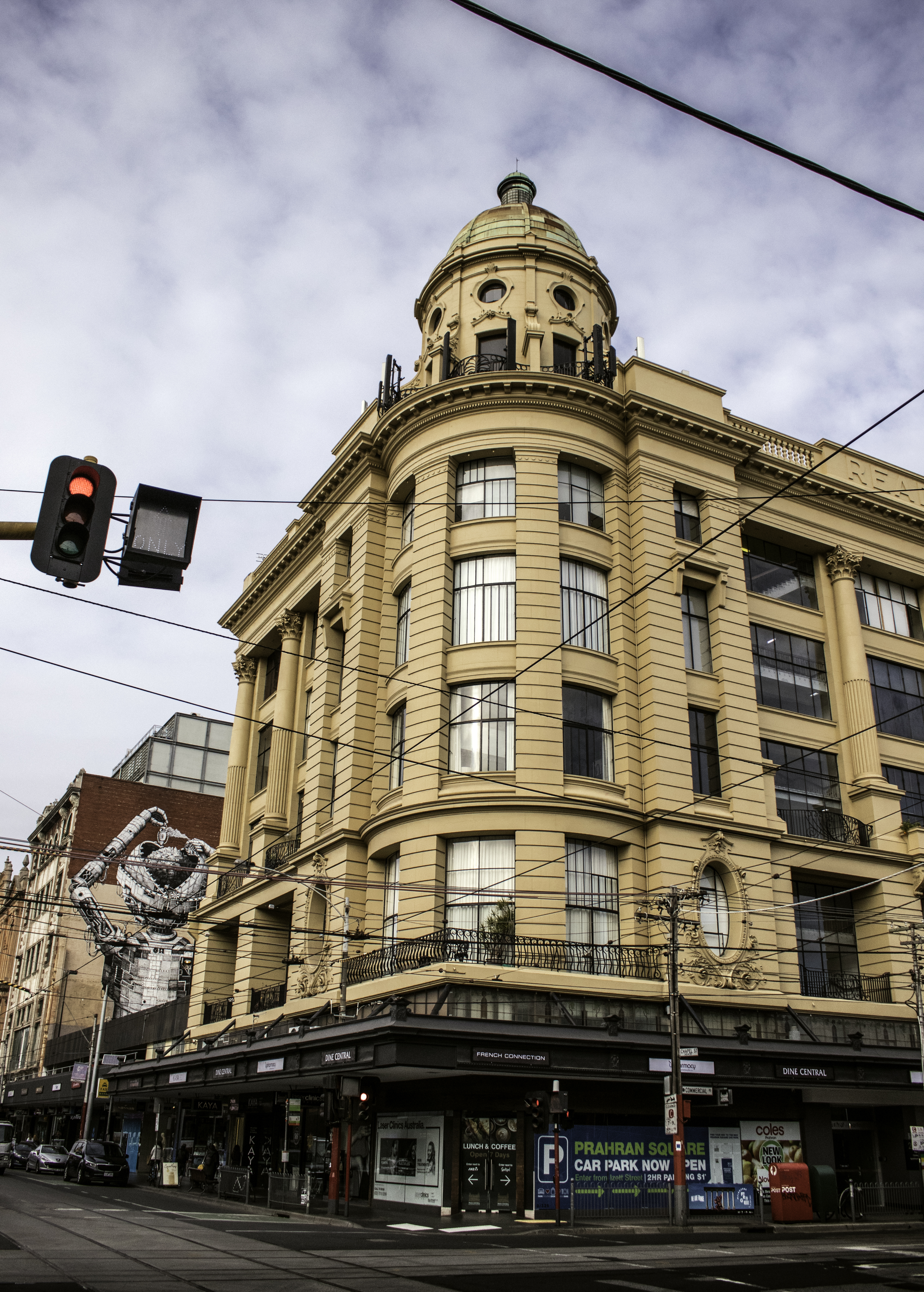
Pran Central Building, on the corner of Chapel Street and Commercial Road

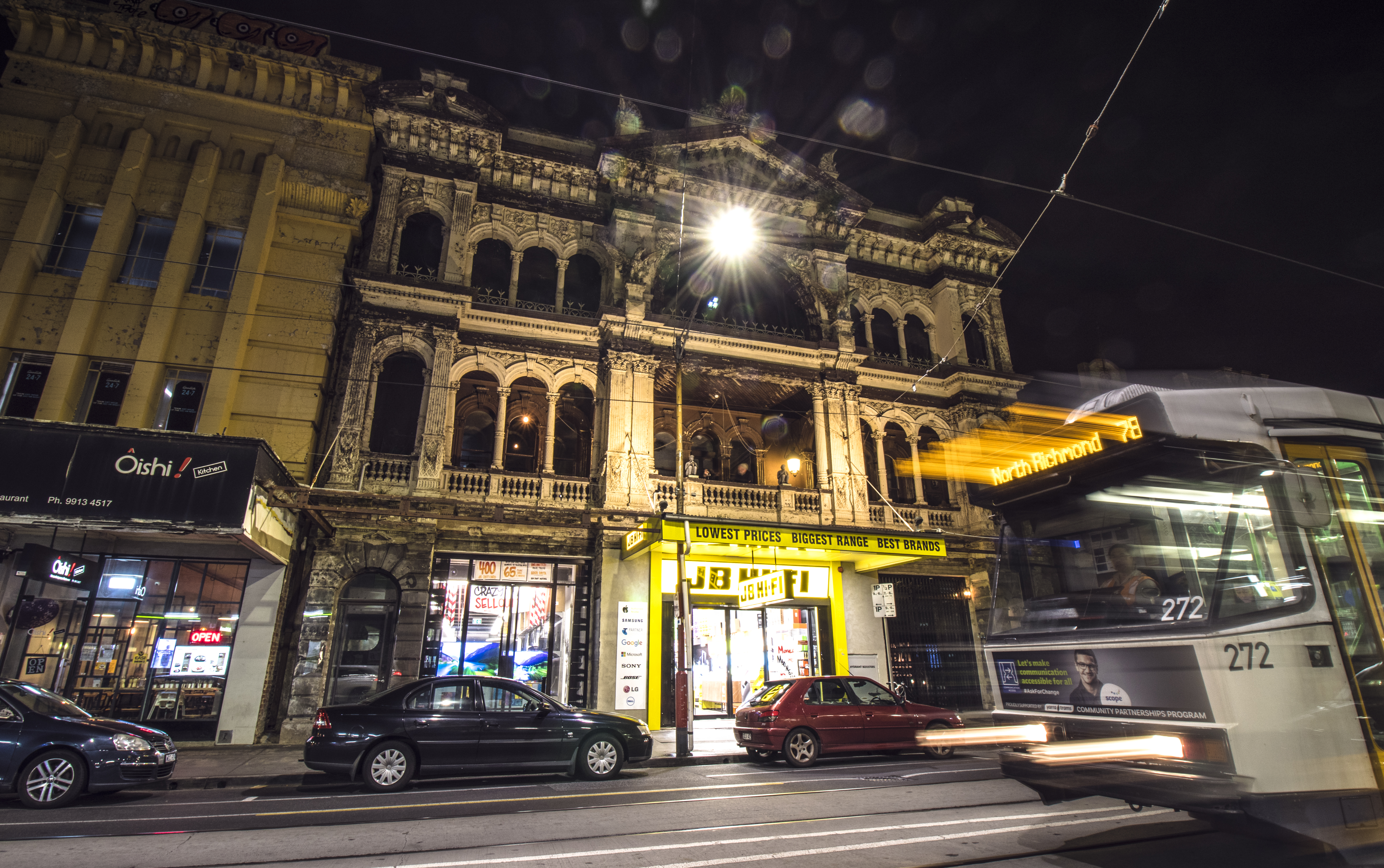
JB Hi-Fi building on Chapel Street, Prahran

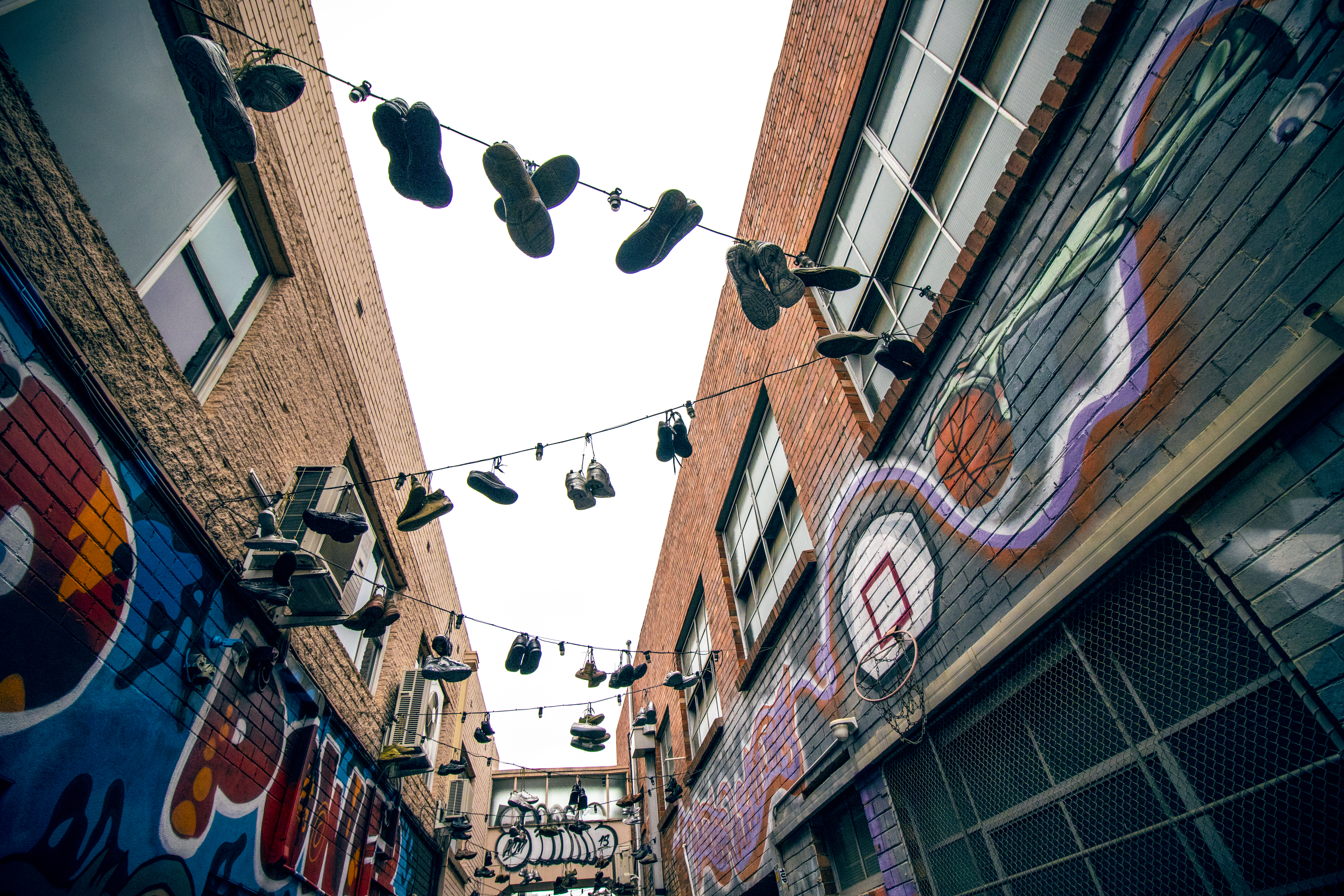
Sneakers hanging in Sneaker Lane in Windsor, Chapel Street

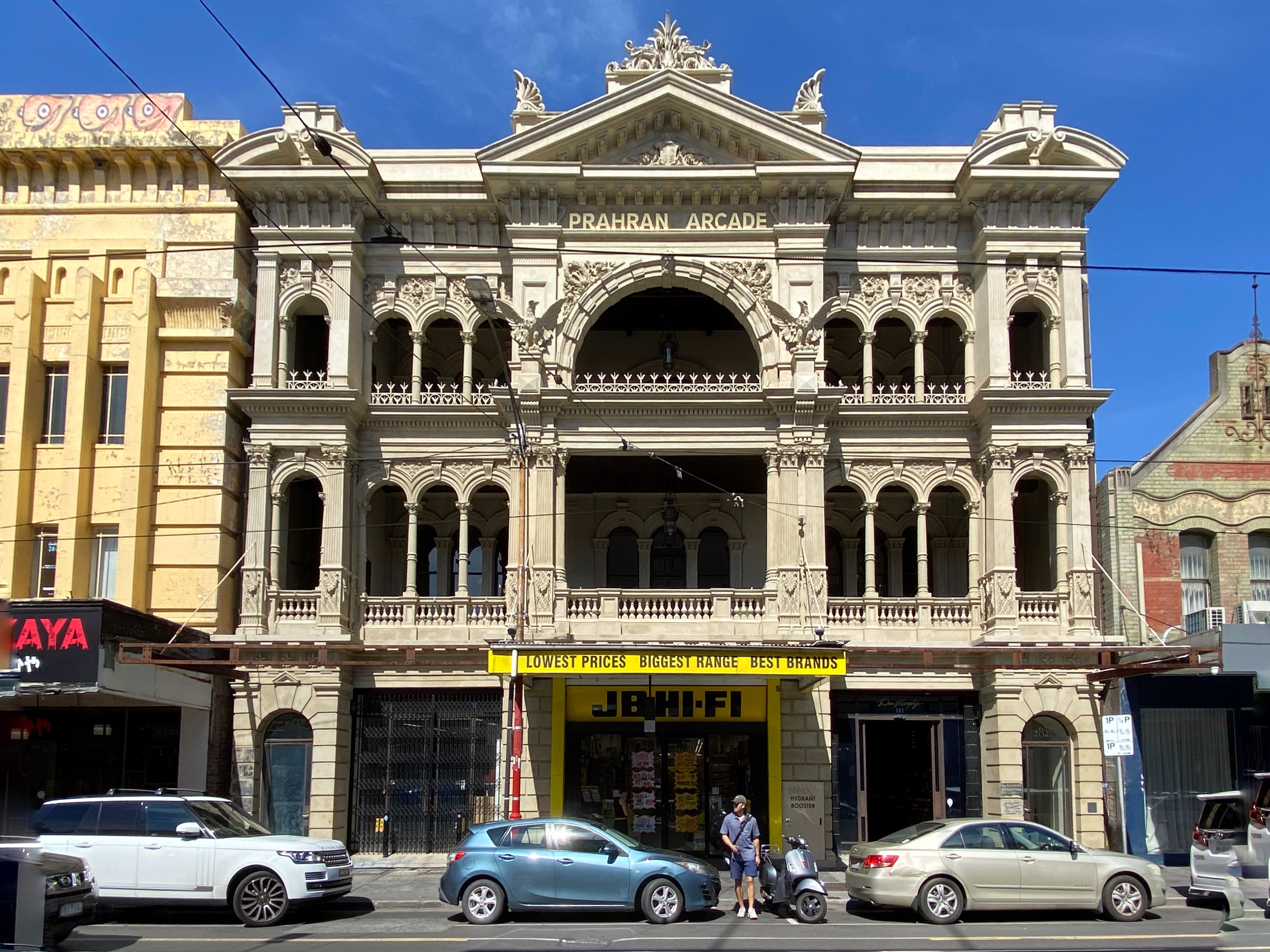
Prahran Arcade
