= UnitingCare Australia =

Australian church charity

UnitingCare Australia is the national body for the UnitingCare network, made up of the Uniting Church in Australia's (UCA) community services agencies.

It is a sister body to UnitingJustice Australia, and UnitingWorld. All are agencies of the Uniting Church in Australia, National Assembly.

UnitingCare Australia advocates on behalf of the UnitingCare network to the Australian Federal Government.

== UnitingCare network ==
UnitingCare is a brand name under which many Uniting Church community services agencies operate although they may be agencies of the respective Synods, or separate legal entities. Together with agencies under the Uniting Church in Australia without the UnitingCare brand, the agencies form the UnitingCare network.

The network is one of Australia's largest non-government community services provider networks, with over 1,600 sites Australia-wide. The UnitingCare network has 40,000 employees and 30,000 volunteers nationally, and provides services to children, young people and families, people with disabilities, and older Australians, in urban, rural and remote communities, including residential and community care, child care, homelessness prevention and support, family support, domestic violence and disability services.

Examples of non-UnitingCare branded agencies within the UnitingCare network include Uniting NSW.ACT, Uniting WA, Juniper (WA), Somerville Community Services (NT), and Uniting Communities (SA). The network also includes the Uniting Missions Network, made up of 34 missions such as the Wesley Missions in Queensland and NSW, and Blue Care in Queensland.

Uniting Vic.Tas (legally Uniting (Victoria and Tasmania) Limited) is a member of the UnitingCare network and is the community services organisation of the Uniting Church in Australia Synod of Victoria and Tasmania, delivering services and programs across both states. It was formed in 2017 when 21 UnitingCare agencies, Wesley Mission Victoria and several Uniting Church business units were brought together as a single organisation, Uniting (Victoria and Tasmania) Limited. Uniting Vic.Tas delivers hundreds of programs in areas such as housing and homelessness, alcohol and other drug treatment, mental health, carer support, early learning and family services across metropolitan, regional and rural communities in Victoria and Tasmania.

== Mandate ==
UnitingCare Australia's mandate is:

- To take up community service issues within the theological framework of the Uniting Church, particularly the Church's social justice perspectives.
- To develop and reflect on the policies and practices of the Uniting Church in community services.
- To pursue appropriate issues within the Uniting Church, with Government and the community sector, with the Australian community and with other parts of the church.

== National Director ==
The first National Director of UnitingCare Australia was Libby Davies AM, appointed in 1994 until 2001. Lin Hatfield Dodds was National Director until July 2016. Martin Cowling acted as the National Director between June 2016 and December 2016. Claerwen Little then served as National Director from February 2017 to September 2025.

== See also ==
- Wesley Mission
- Prahran Mission
- The Wayside Chapel
