= Wesley Mission =

Australian church charity

Wesley Mission is a name used by three independent Uniting Church groups which are a part of the Uniting Missions Network of UnitingCare Australia. These predominantly grew out of inner city Central Methodist Missions of the Methodist Church of Australasia. Most of the Methodist City Missions of that era later joined to form Mission Australia.

== Overview ==
Wesley Mission operates out of over 200 centres and employs over 2,000 staff with a budget of $160 million.

Methodists began doing welfare work in Sydney in 1812. This work became Sydney's Central Methodist Mission in 1884. In 1946 it opened a psychiatric care facility, now known as Wesley Hospital in Ashfield. It later opened another mental health hospital in Kogarah.

In 1963, while led by Reverend Dr Sir Alan Walker, it established Lifeline, now Australia's largest national phone support service and operating in 19 countries.

In 1977, it became known as Wesley Central Mission when it became part of the Uniting Church at its founding. In 1978 Gordon Moyes became Superintendent, and it started producing the nationally broadcast TV show Turn Around Australia (now Wesley Impact! TV) on the Nine Network. In 1979, Edward Eagar Lodge opened, extending on earlier homeless housing work started in 1866. In 1989, it established the Wesley Institute, an educational organisation that is now known as Excelsia College (and left the organisation in 2013). In 1994, the organisation's name changed to Wesley Mission. In 1995 it established Wesley LifeForce, now Australia's largest provider of anti-suicide training.

Rev Dr. Keith Vincent Garner became Superintendent in 2006.

In 2021, the Mission called Stu Cameron, a Uniting Church minister who had grown several churches on the Gold Coast, to become the CEO and Superintendent.

=== Wesley Mission Newcastle ===
Newcastle City Mission was founded in 1940 by a group of Newcastle business people with the aim of assisting those in distress and poverty throughout Newcastle and the Hunter Valley. In 1999, Newcastle City Mission merged with Wesley Mission Sydney to become Wesley Mission Newcastle.

Wesley Mission Newcastle services the Newcastle and Hunter region. Services delivered from the Newcastle offices include gambling and financial counselling, youth services, a seniors living centre, vocational training, home and community care, emergency relief, a retail furniture store, family services and chaplaincy.

=== Further reading ===
- Blackmore, Rod (Winter 2015). "Wesley Organs". Sydney Organ Journal. 46 (3): 33–37.

== Wesley Mission Queensland ==
Queensland's Methodists began in Brisbane in 1847, Albert Street, Brisbane, doing a variety of welfare work. This work grew into the Brisbane Central Methodist Mission, offering a broad range of services to Brisbane's poor. In 1936 Queensland's first aged care community, it opened the Garden Settlement (now Wheller Gardens), in Chermside. They changed their name to Wesley Mission Queensland in 2016.

By 2017, it was providing services for 100,000 people each year, including childcare for 1338 children and 13 aged care services and retirement living for more than 4000 older people, over 600 free meals pre provided each week from Emergency and Hardship service.

== Wesley Mission Victoria ==
Wesley Mission Victoria (previously Wesley Mission Melbourne) provides a range of community services that help people improve their quality of life and increase their social and economic participation. It works across a range of service areas including aged care, children youth and family, crisis and homelessness, disability, and employment.

Wesley is the organisation behind some of Melbourne's best known and most valued community services, including the Lifeline Melbourne telephone counselling service and Wesley Do Care – a social support service helping older people stay socially active and participate in their community.

Wesley Mission Victoria was established as the Melbourne Central Methodist Mission in 1893, next to the Wesley Church in Lonsdale Street, Melbourne. At that time, the area was known as the 'back slums' of Melbourne and was notorious for opium dens, gambling houses and places of ill-repute.

Wesley's heritage is founded on the response of Wesleyan Methodists in Victoria to the severe economic depression and associated inner city poverty of the early 1890s.

Today the organisation employs over 800 staff and receives the support of over 1,600 volunteers who help to deliver more than 50 services across metropolitan Melbourne.
