= Keith Vincent Garner =

English Methodist Minister (born 1955)

Keith Vincent Garner AM
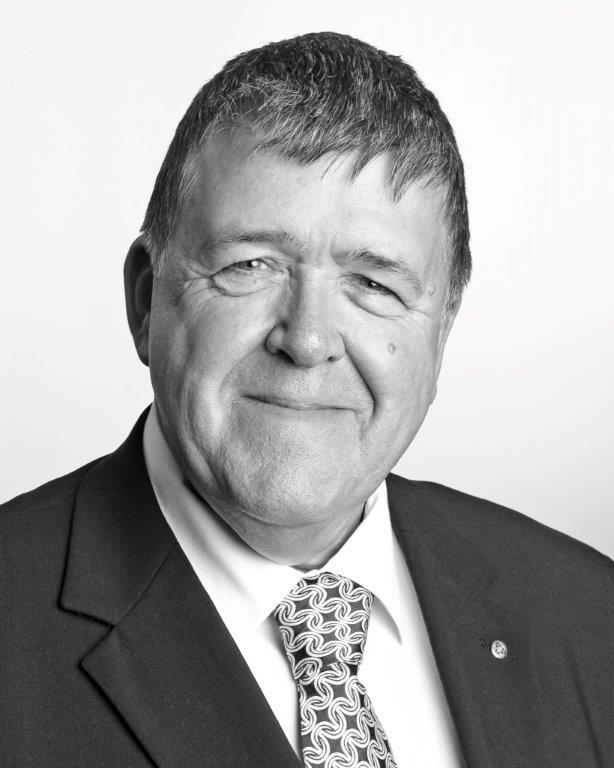
- Rev Keith V Garner AM
- Born: 4 January 1955 (age 71); Stockport, Greater Manchester, United Kingdom
- Occupation: Australian minister

Keith Vincent Garner AM (born 4 January 1955 in Stockport, Greater Manchester, UK) is an ordained Methodist Minister, granted permission by the British Methodist Church to serve the Uniting Church in Australia as Superintendent of Wesley Mission in Sydney, Australia from February 2006. In that role, he had responsibility for more than 2,400 staff and 6,500 volunteers in 180 different projects engaged in social and community work with a wide range of community groups throughout NSW.

== Ministerial life ==
Keith Garner was made a Member of the Order of Australia (AM) in the 2015 Queen’s Birthday honours for "significant service to the community and for being an advocate for people who are homeless and socially disadvantaged, and to pastoral care". “It is pleasing but humbling to be recognised in your adopted country,” Garner said, emphasising that the award bore testimony to the strong team that he worked with at Wesley Mission. In 2013 he received an award for Outstanding Community Service from the NSW Government.

Keith Garner has preached and missioned internationally and is a contributor to the UK website, The Sermon. Garner has been an active supporter of the Bible Seminary of Yangon , in the Union of Myanmar, which bestowed upon him the Honorary Degree of Doctor of Divinity on 8 March 2008.

Both Keith and his wife Carol became Australian citizens on 20 August 2008 as well as retaining British citizenship. He concluded his leadership of Wesley Mission on 31 December 2020 and was followed by Rev Stuart Cameron, but he retains an interest and is an active supporter of Wesley Mission.

== Personal life ==
Garner is married to Carol and they live on the Northern Beaches of Sydney in the suburb of Belrose. His pre-ordination training was undertaken at Wesley College, Bristol. He was ordained as a Methodist minister in 1982 and was a minister at Plymouth, Darlington, Llandudno and Bolton. Garner completed his Master of Theology through Oxford University in 1995, and has spoken in Africa, Iceland, Europe, North America, New Zealand, China and throughout Asia. Garner has been a frequent speaker, whilst in the UK, at festivals and conventions such as Cliff College, where he spent two years in 1974/5.

Garner has been an active member of the Rotary Club of Sydney and the Australian Club. Garner being a past president of the Rotary Club of Sydney, inducted on 3 July 2018. As his President's Project for the Rotary Club of Sydney he launched the 'Sydney Rotary Resilience Program', raising over $220,000, helping to build a Suicide Prevention Network in Sydney with a focus on Aboriginal and First Nations groups. He was made a Paul Harris Fellow in March 2020.

Following his retirement as CEO of Wesley Mission he maintains a weekly radio program with United Christian Broadcasters in the UK. Garner is a member of Pittwater Uniting Church where he preaches from time to time. He is a panel member on a weekly TV program 'Helping Hands' on Channel 9 and other channels.

On 19 November 2023, Garner was installed as the Chair of the Sydney Central Coast Presbytery, which stretches from the north coast of Sydney Harbour to the northern parts of the Central Coast of NSW. It covers over 55 churches and a similar number of ministers.

== Community involvement ==
Garner has marked out his life and work by commitment to the wider community. This began as a young person when in 1972 he initiated and organised a world record attempt on a group singing marathon. The record was broken over the weekend of 29–30 July 1972. In August 2015, as Garner's appointment as Superintendent/CEO of Wesley Mission was extended by the Wesley Mission Council until 2020, he said he saw this as the "third phase" of his tenure. The first five years marked his arrival and accumulative understanding of Wesley Mission's rich heritage, present complexity and potential for future development. The following five years he interpreted as building bridges: strengthening relationships and earning the trust of service partners; the third and final five year phase was defined by growth. "Our Word and deed integration is critical in moving forward," he said in a message to congregations.

Garner has been closely involved with welfare and service provision to the aged, families, the unemployed and homeless, those experiencing financial stress, addictions and personal crises. His contribution was recognised with his inclusion in the Government's Australia 2020 Summit in 2008. He was a director of the Community Council for Australia, a peak body for Not for Profit agencies.

Garner was until December 2020 a board member of the major religious organisations’ group SEIROS (The Study of the Economic Impact of Religion on Society). This Board was formed to commission sociological and econometric research to demonstrate the contribution that organised religion makes to Australian society.

In August 2015, Garner launched a new program specially designed to assist Indigenous communities in preventing suicide, explaining that the method of delivery was important. “Instead of a trainer facilitator standing in front of a room saying, ‘this is what you should do’, it's really much more of a ‘yarning circle’ where people together sit down and share their experiences and in a much longer way are allowed to tell those stories, feel the pain and know what it is to share together and share the experiences of their community," he said. The launch of the Aboriginal and Torres Strait Islander Wesley LifeForce Suicide Prevention Program coincided with the annual Wesley LifeForce Suicide Prevention Networks conference which drew more than 100 representatives from 60 local networks from across Australia. Among the Wesley LifeForce networks is the Gunyangara community which in 2007 had the highest pro rata suicide rate in the world. For the following two years not a single death by suicide was recorded in that community. Garner told the annual Wesley LifeForce Memorial Service by the Sydney Opera House, attended each year by hundreds of people, that suicide “affects people from all walks of life, of all ages, and it affects many, many people – more than 3000 people in Australia bring their lives to an end each year”. Garner led the expansion of Wesley LifeForce through its 114 networks across Australia and significant events have been held in Sydney, Brisbane, Newcastle, Adelaide and Darwin and retains a strong commitment to suicide prevention.

In 2014, Garner and the then NSW Premier Mike Baird signed the first contracts in “the most significant reform of homelessness services in a generation”. Garner said the Going Home Staying Home program – for which the NSW Government spent more than half a billion dollars over three years with partners such as Wesley Mission – was an opportunity to break the cycle of inter-generational homelessness and that he was pleased to see more funding directed to suburban and regional areas given Wesley Mission’s research that more than 70 per cent of homeless people using inner-Sydney services come from suburban and regional areas. “We are now moving from ad hoc and piecemeal approaches to homelessness to a more strategic and cohesive model,” Garner said. He also served as deputy co-chair of NSW Premiers Council on Homelessness 2010-2017 under four different Premiers.

Launching the Wesley Report, Giving Disability Carers a Break, in May 2014, Garner said Wesley Mission's research found that more than a third of families in Australia had a person with a disability and that the role of carer "was hugely taxing and takes its toll on even the most robust, loving people."

Interviewed in the media about an early intervention program in south-west Sydney for young mothers with a mental illness, Garner said the intervention program sought to help mothers to develop resilience "and remain connected with networks of support and friendship". He was happy the NSW Government had made mental health a policy priority.

In 2018, Garner became one of the signatories to End Street Sleeping: Sydney Zero in New South Wales, in partnership with the Premier. He later became a founding board director for the End Street Sleeping Collaboration until the beginning of 2021.

In July 2020, Garner was involved in publishing a joint white paper with Suicide Prevention Australia titled, Reducing distress in the community following the COVID-19 pandemic which proposed a positive roadmap of recommendations to help build community resilience. He hosted a webinar on the same topic, with the National Suicide Prevention Adviser, Christine Morgan contributing to the conversation. The webinar was broadcast publicly and was well received with commentary on the white paper featured in the Sydney Morning Herald article Report on heightened suicide risk points to hope.

In 2022, Keith Garner became a board member of the Northern Beaches Christian School, an independent co-ed school of 1300 children from kindergarten to Year 12. It is a non-denominational Christian school. He also serves on the Board Finance Committee.

== Publications and media appearances ==
In August 2015, Australians in the Wesleyan tradition celebrated the 200th anniversary of the arrival of Rev Samuel Leigh, Australia’s first Methodist minister, with a celebration service at the Wesley Centre in Sydney. To mark the occasion Garner published a biography, Samuel Leigh: The first Methodist missionary to Australia and New Zealand. “The legacy Samuel Leigh has left is not just about the churches and ministries he instigated or set up; it is as much about his sacrificial commitment to the work of God, his determination to continue in his ministry despite heartbreaking obstacles, and his humble and enduring faith,” Garner said.

During his time in Australia, Garner then campaigned on many issues that relate to personal finance and debt. In November 2017, the Federal Treasurer announced that positive credit ratings would become mandatory from July 2018. This is something that Garner had campaigned for nine years. He was interviewed on Ross Greenwood's Money program about this achievement on 2 November 2017.

The documentary John Wesley: The Man and his Mission, co-written and presented by Garner, won Third Place for Best Documentary at the International Christian Film & Music Festival (ICFF) in 2013. Garner journeyed throughout England to trace the story of the founder of Methodism in this “beautifully produced documentary” released by UK-based distributor Gateway Films/Vision Video. A review describes the documentary, directed by Richard Attieh, as “an inspiration to Christians and principled humanitarians of all faiths, highly recommended especially for public library and church DVD collections”.

During two weeks filming on location Israel, Garner hosted a six-part TV series called The Man of Galilee. This series explores the significance of the Galilee region in the life and teachings of Jesus Christ. The series is especially designed for small groups to use in discussion and studies, and the DVD version of the series includes a study guide with discussion questions. The Man of Galilee was aired over six Sundays from 29 April 2018 on Channel Nine as well as being repeated during November 2018.

In 2013 Garner was interviewed on the ABC about the key Wesley Mission report, Homelessness and the next generation, which reported a change in the demographic of those experiencing homelessness. He expressed concern that action on homelessness would be overlooked by both sides of politics in the bid to win government. In May 2012 Keith Garner spoke about the Wesley Mission report, Keeping minds well: Caring till it hurts. He has written A Word for the World (2013) and Cross Talk – Words for the Crossroads of Life (2008). He regularly hosted television programs produced by Wesley Mission which were shown on Channel 9 and the Australian Christian Channel. He was involved in the film Santa’s Forgotten People, a documentary about the Wesley Mission's work with the homeless at Christmas. Garner was a recognised spokesperson for welfare issues, discussing issues such as financial stress and homelessness in Australia. In late June 2013, marking 50 years since the inception of the Lifeline Suicide Prevention service, Keith and Carol Garner were hosts to ABC radio presenter, Simon Marnie, to their home for Sunday Brunch, part of the Weekends with Simon Marnie program on ABC 702. Uniquely, Garner was invited to be the interview guest on this program for a second time on Easter Day 2020, in a live interview from his home. Simon also interviewed Keith on Channel 9 in December 2020.

Easter Mission had been an important part of the life of Wesley Mission. During the COVID-19 pandemic, the Wesley Centre on Pitt Street in Sydney initially had to be closed and rather than to cancel the regular service broadcast on the Nine Network to Australians and streamed internationally on Easter Sunday, a special Sunrise Service was broadcast under strict health conditions from studio. Garner also streamed a nightly devotional series, The Isolation of the Cross, from his back garden each night during Holy Week 2020. The online audience grew day by day with thousands watching on Facebook and YouTube. The series was also aired on UCB2 radio in the UK. Keith commented to the Methodist Recorder, "The response to the series was overwhelming. Nearly two thirds of the audience for the final episode came from outside Australia, with the highest number of viewers from London and New York. This has so much to say that where the virus was most prevalent, people are looking for hope."

Garner has also written opinion pieces in the mainstream media The Sydney Morning Herald. One article from 2012, supporting the community drive to protect public holidays, was widely quoted by work/life balance advocacy groups, such as the Facebook community group, Take the Time. Another article, marking the 2013 birth of Prince George, contrasted the life of a royal baby with that of a child born to a family struggling as part of Australia's "working poor".

Methodist theologian Alan Walker's life and work was featured in Garner's book, The Authentic Australian Evangelist: Alan Walker, published in March, 2014. The release of the book was accompanied by an address at Wesley Church on 13 March 2014. In his address, Garner said Walker, called "the conscience of the nation" by the former Governor-General, Bill Hayden, "will always be remembered for his strong Christian leadership … and a preparedness to stand beside the most vulnerable and disadvantaged no matter the personal cost. He also had a willingness to take a stand on what were then unpopular causes, but which later became orthodox thinking.” The address is available on DVD. This book cannot be found. Keith Garner gave sermon on Alan Walker in 2013.

Garner wrote a regular blog and hosted a weekly Christian broadcast on Wesley Impact TV via YouTube. His 2015 Easter Address was explored in depth on the ABC's Religion and Ethics Report.

Garner has been involved in a number of projects speaking for the Not for Profit sector and was the first interview in a series of four films entitled 'People at the Centre' and the theme was “Not for Profit but Definitely Gain”.

In the interview Garner described the Not for Profit sector as equally vitally important as the corporate sector and talked about people being the focus in what is a “complex sector”. He said “we are not making widgets, but we are trying to lift somebody out of poverty into a new place – that is very difficult to do." His final year at Wesley Mission saw significant strides undertaken to completely refurbish Wesley Edward Eagar Centre in Surry Hills for people experiencing homelessness and the development approval of Wesley R.J. Williams in Glebe as social and affordable housing.

Keith Garner's story is featured in Stories from the Streets and Beyond written by Jim Rea MBE. This story explains why Garner has had a strong link with the Church in Ireland.

Garner has written a book titled Faith, Compassion and the Challenge of Business, reflecting on his ministry and leadership in readiness for his retirement at the end of 2020. Rev Tim Costello AO described the book as, "The best textbook I have read on the unusual challenge of combining Christian ministry and professional service delivery in one of Australia's oldest and largest social welfare charities." Garner was interviewed about the book and his life by Indira Naidoo for ABC's This Mortal Coil and by Andrew West for ABC Radio National's Religion and Ethics Report.
