= Melbourne Art Trams =

Public art project in Melbourne, Australia

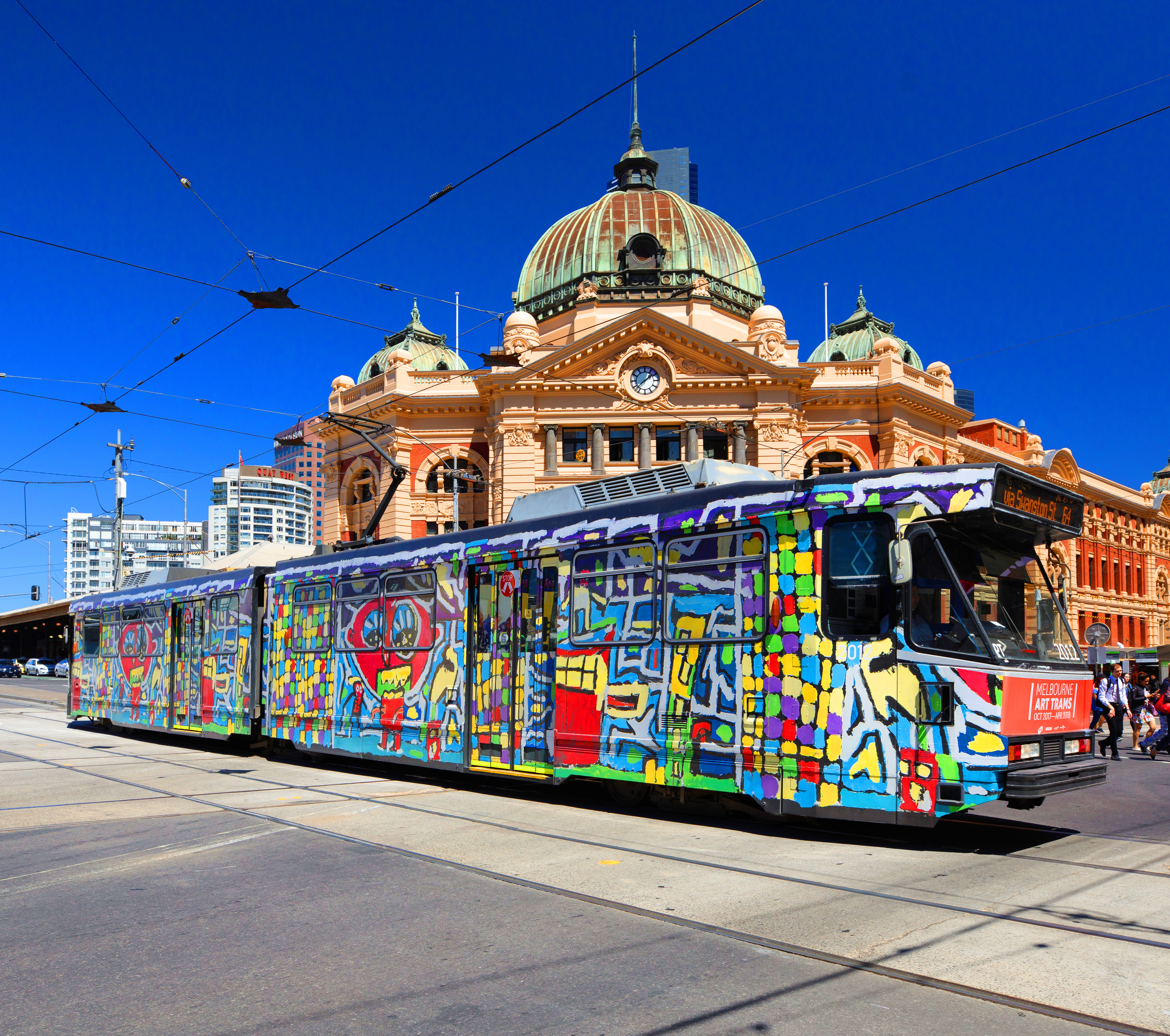
A Melbourne Art Tram designed by Matthew Clarke for the 2017 project

The Melbourne Art Trams is a major public art project in Melbourne, Australia. It is a revival and re-imagining of the Transporting Art project which ran from 1978 to 1993 and saw 36 painted W-class trams rolled out across the Melbourne network.

Melbourne Festival reinvigorated the project in 2013 with an annual expression of interest process from Victorian-based artists. Seven professional and one emerging artist are commissioned each year, with their artwork digitally printed on vinyl and applied to modern trams. The eight designs are released onto the network each October as part of Melbourne Festival's visual art program.

In 2017, one design celebrated the 20 year anniversary of the shared history of tram workers and decorated trams in Melbourne and Kolkata, India. In 2018, the project was renewed for three years.

The project is funded by Melbourne Festival, Creative Victoria, Public Transport Victoria and Yarra Trams.

== Artists ==
Melbourne Art Trams artists 2013-2018
Artist	Project year
Freya Pitt	2013
Brook Andrew	2013
Rose Nolan	2013
David Wadelton	2013
Luke Cornish (E.L.K)	2013
Bindi Cole	2013
Jon Campbell	2013
Joining Forces	2013
Jeff Makin	2014
Gabriella Possum Nungurrayi	2014
Kristin Headlam	2014
James Cattell	2014
Christian Thompson	2014
Janine Daddo	2014
Rone	2014
Callum Croker	2014
Stephen Banham	2015
Matthew Bird & Philip Adams	2015
Martine Corompt	2015
Louise Forthun	2015
Amanda Morgan	2015
Kathy Temin	2015
Tom Vincent	2015
James Voller	2015
Damiano Bertoli	2016
Eddie Botha	2016
Jon Cattapan	2016
Eliza Dyball	2016
Megan Evans and Eve Glenn	2016
Jocelin Lee	2016
Mimi Leung	2016
Reko Rennie	2016
Emma Anna	2017
Matthew Clarke	2017
Bushra Hasan	2017
Oliver Hutchison	2017
Justine McAllister	2017
Josh Muir	2017
Robert Owen	2017
St Albans Heights Primary School's Community Hub	2017
Hayley Millar-Baker	2018
David Larwill	2018
Nick Howson	2018
Oli Ruskidd	2018
Oslo Davis	2018
Stephen Baker	2018
Troy Innocent	2018
Valerie Tang	2018
Nyein Aung	2019
Sophie Westerman	2019
Kent Morris	2019
Nusra Latif Qureshi	2019
Lesley Dumbrell	2019
Gene Bawden	2019
Tricia Van Der-Kuyp	2019
Beaconhills College	2019

== Gallery ==
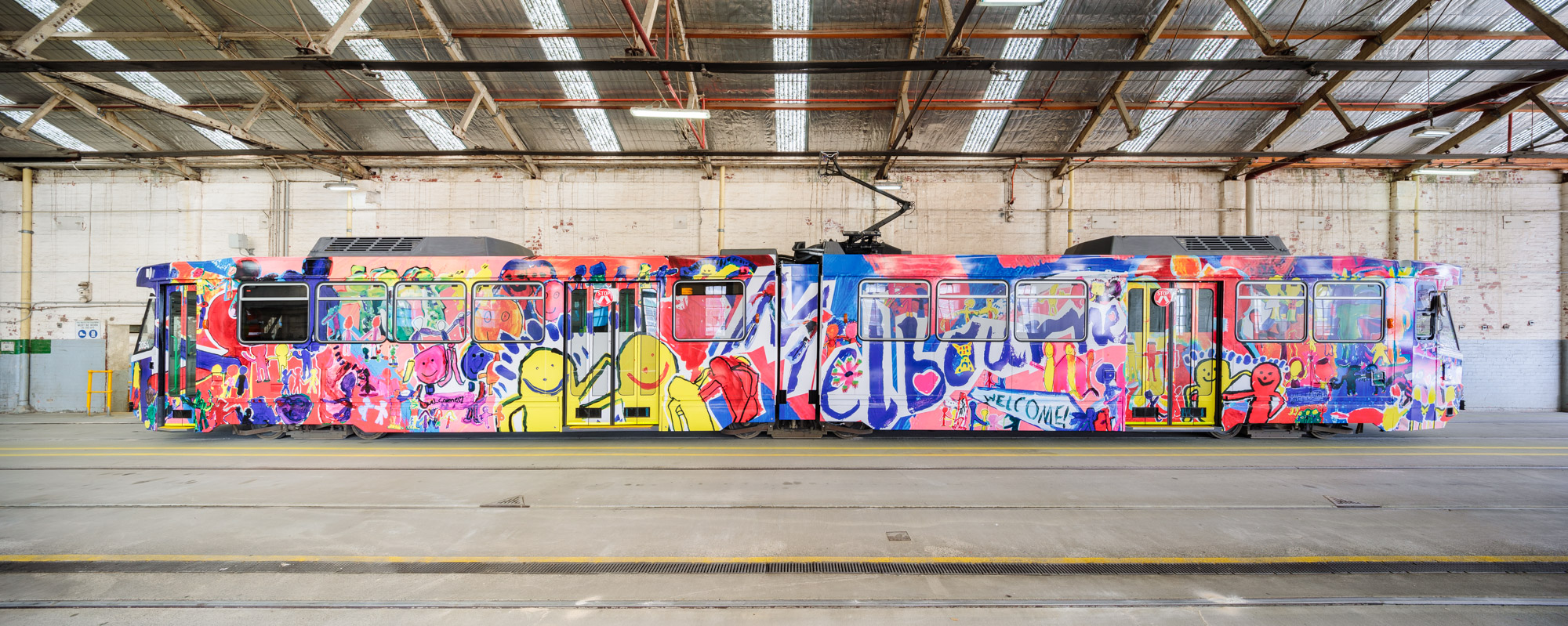

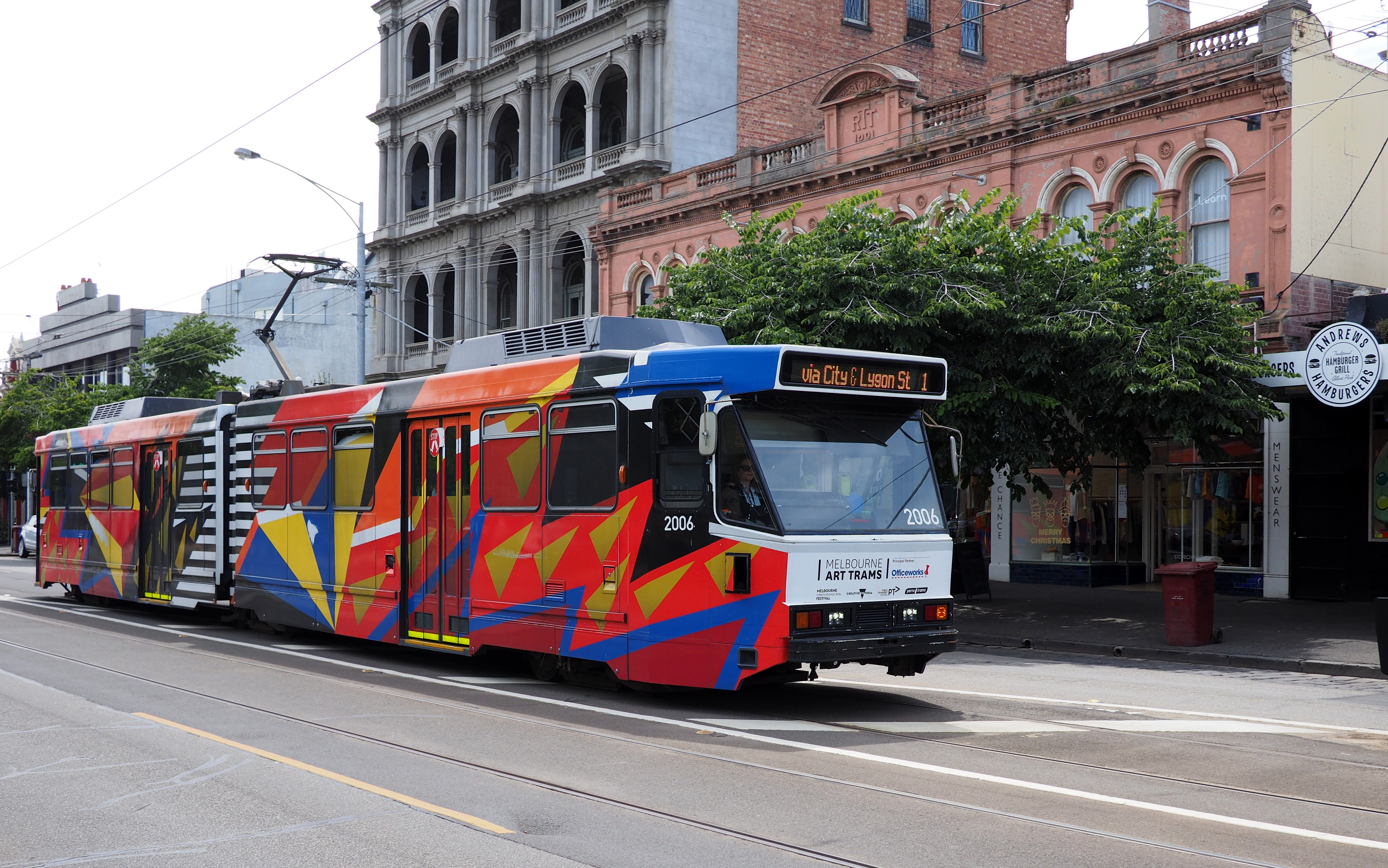

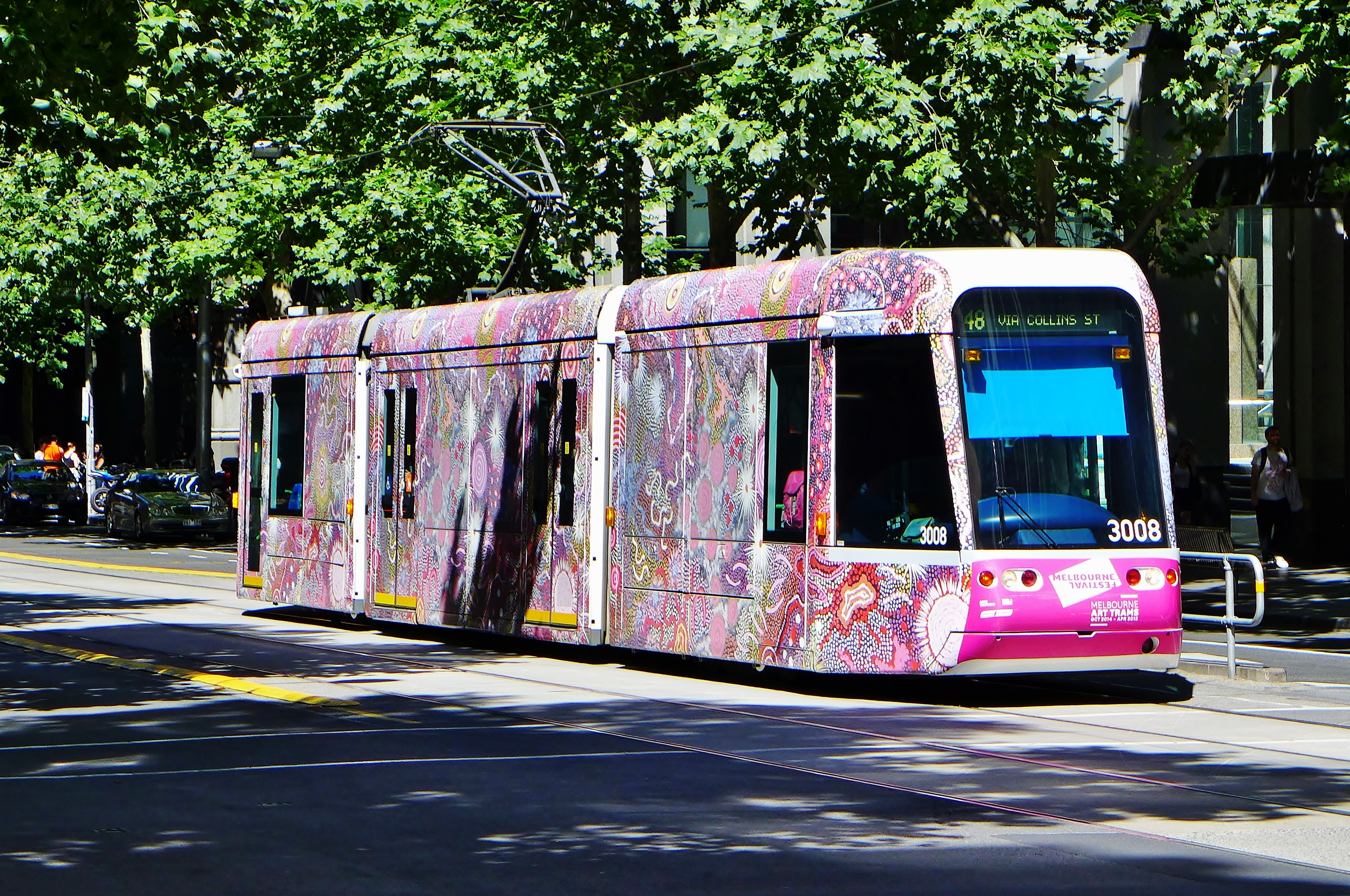

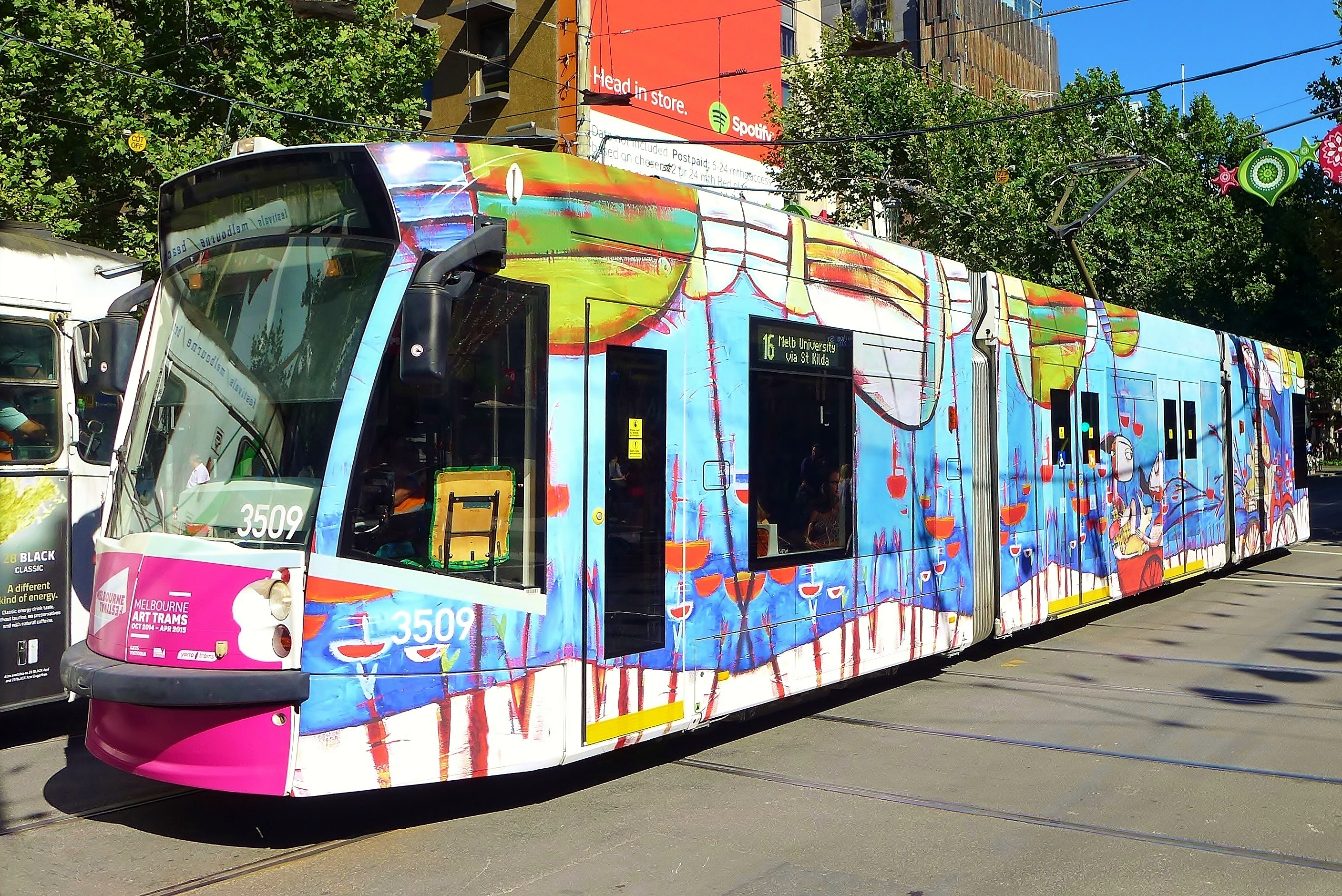

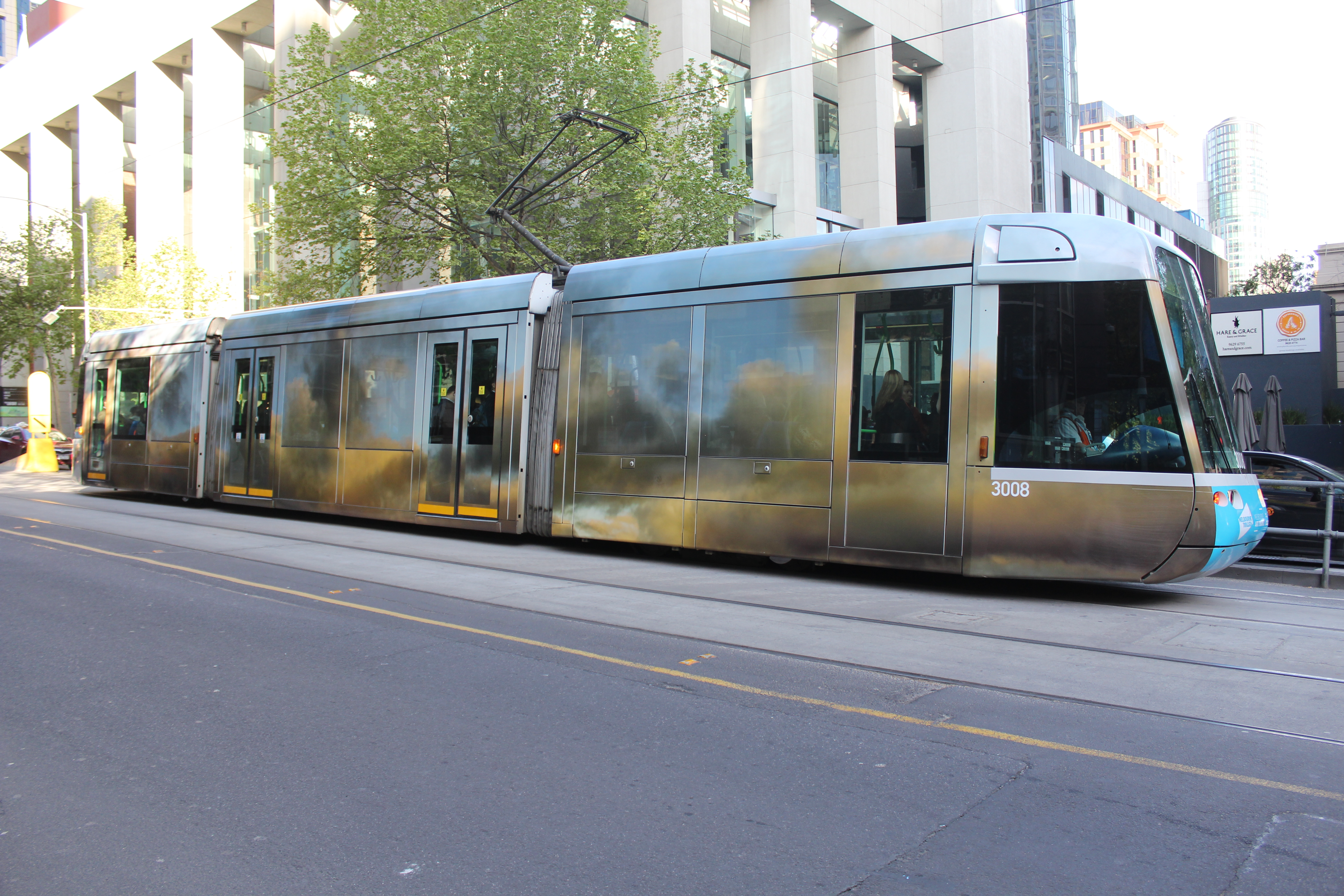

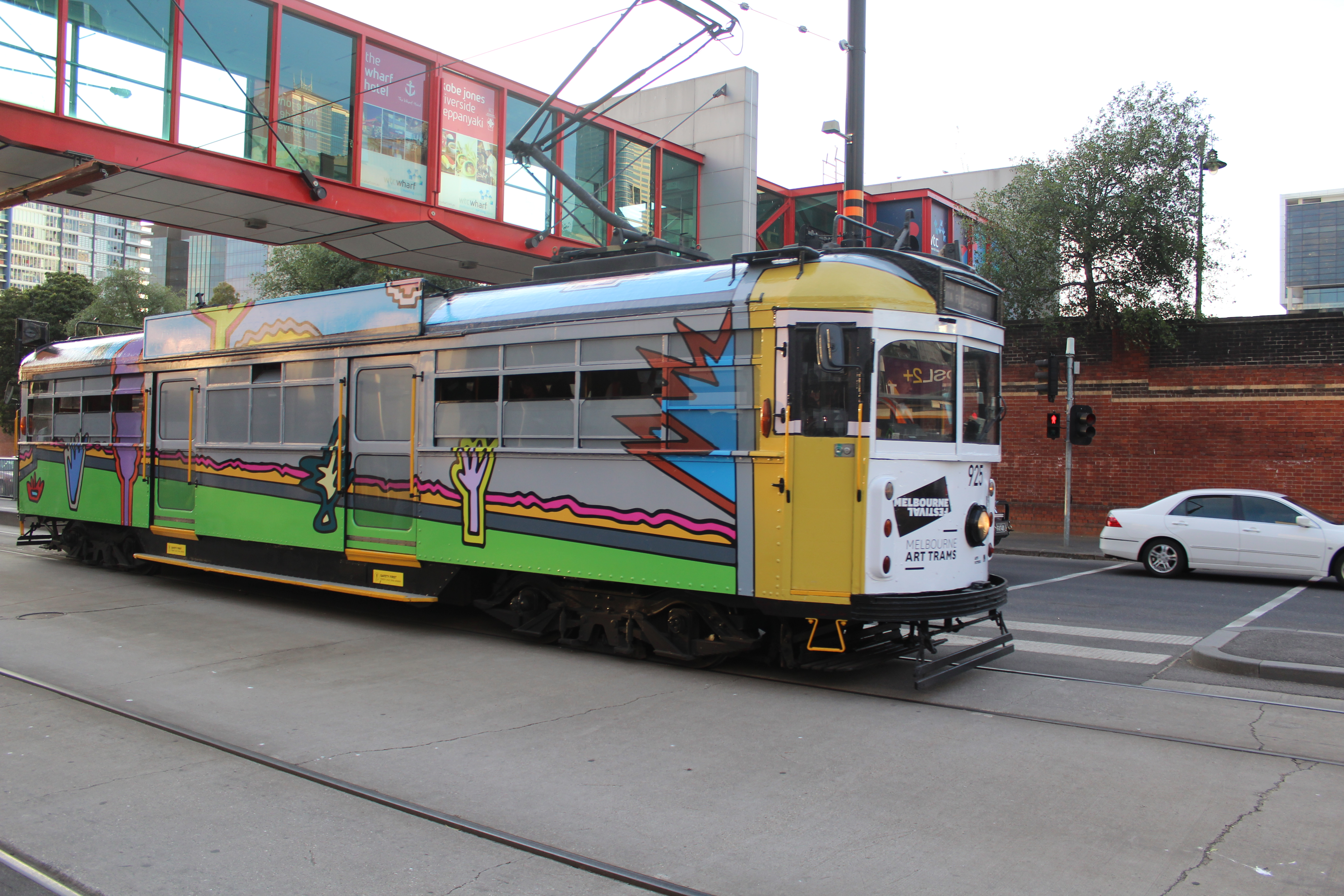
