= Jon Cattapan =

Australian visual artist (born 1956)

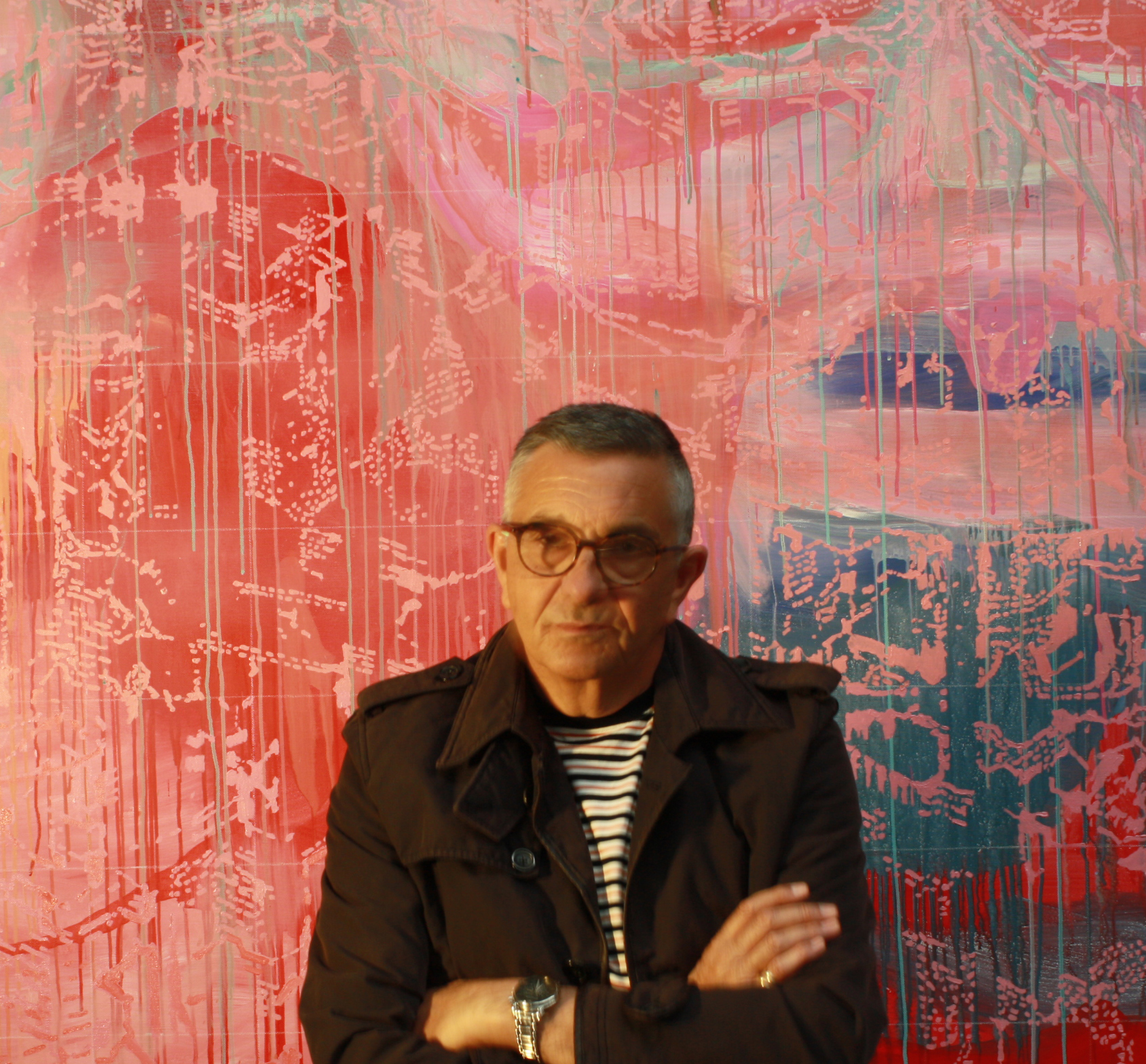
- Born: Melbourne, Australia
- Education: Highett High School; RMIT; Monash University
- Occupations: Artist, academic
- Years active: 1979–present
- Employer: University of Melbourne
- Website: www.joncattapan.com.au

Jon Cattapan (born 1956) is an Australian visual artist best known for his abstract oil paintings of cityscapes, his service as the 63rd Australian war artist and his work as a professor of visual art at the University of Melbourne in the Faculty of Fine Arts and Music at the Victorian College of the Arts. Cattapan's artworks are held in several major galleries and collections, including the National Gallery of Victoria, the Art Gallery of New South Wales, Queensland Art Gallery, and the National Gallery of Australia.

== Early life and education ==
=== Childhood and early adulthood ===
Jon Cattapan was born in 1956 in Melbourne to Italian parents. Cattapan's family emigrated from Castelfranco in the Veneto region of Italy after World War II. Cattapan was first taught to draw aged six by an older cousin on a trip to Italy.

Cattapan's family initially lived in the inner city suburb of Carlton, known as Melbourne's Little Italy, before moving to the suburb of Highett where Cattapan spent the majority of his childhood and young adult life.

=== Tertiary education ===
Cattapan initially studied computer science for a year at RMIT before instead deciding to pursue art and enrolling in a Bachelor of Fine Arts in painting at RMIT. He graduated from RMIT in 1977. Cattapan went on to complete a Masters of Arts by research in 1992 at Monash University.

== Career ==
=== Early career (1977–1989) ===
Cattapan had his first group exhibition Crisis Drawings in 1978 with artist Peter Ellis at the RMIT faculty gallery and his first solo exhibition Paintings, Constructions and Works on Paper at Realities Gallery in 1983.

Cattapan initially intended to complete postgraduate study in filmmaking after transferring from computer science to RMIT's School of Art however has stated this never happened "because I got right into the painting".

=== Time in America (1989–1991) ===
From 1989 until 1991 Cattapan lived in the United States of America having a residencies at the Australia Council's Greene Street studio in Manhattan and at Ohio State University in Columbus, Ohio. Chris McCauliffe has stated that "Cattapan's time in New York was a turning point, both personally and professionally" and further described Cattapan's work at this time as "disjointed and emotional".

An exhibition of Cattapan's work made between 1990 and 1991 titled 365 Days was shown in 1992 at Realities gallery in Toorak, Melbourne and Bellas gallery in Fortitude Valley, Brisbane. In the corresponding exhibition catalogue Cattapan's artworks are described; "brief moments in a modern metropolis are captured in small detail only to be displaced amongst a melange of information... there is constant movement across the boundaries of figuration and abstraction".

=== Return to Australia and rise in prominence (1991–2008) ===
After returning from America, Cattapan completed several major works including The Melbourne Panels and Possible Histories. Cattapan also states that during this period he undertook several overseas artist residencies including a residency as a visiting artist at Hongik University in Korea, a residency in Venice at the Venice printmaking studio.

=== Service as the 63rd Australian war artist (2008) ===
In 2008, Cattapan served as Australia's 63rd war artist, being deployed to Timor-Leste on a peacekeeping mission with the Australian Army. Cattapan has described his title as a war artist as overly dramatic given the relative stability of Timor-Leste however has also stated that he feels privileged to have been a war artist and that "the experience opened up a very rich and meaningful artistic journey for me".

In 2009, the ABC aired a documentary following Cattapan's journey to Timor-Leste and the subsequent influence on his artistic process.

=== Post Timor-Leste (2008–present) ===
Cattapan was the recipient of the Bulgari Art Award in 2013. The award, a partnership between Bulgari and the Art Gallery of New South Wales, was bestowed upon Cattapan for his artwork titled Imagine a Raft (Hard Rubbish 4 + 5). As part of the award, the gallery purchased the artwork for $50,000 AUD and Cattapan was awarded and additional $30,000 AUD to travel to Italy to complete an artist's residency, which he intended to complete in Rome and Venice.

Still influenced by his time as a war artist, Cattapan collaborated with fellow war artists Charles Green and Lyndell Brown on collaborative shows such as Spook Country. Dan Rule of The Age described these collaborations overall as discussing and resonating with the repercussions of conflict, especially the notion of accountability in relation to conflict occurring overseas.

In 2016 Cattapan was selected to feature in the Melbourne Art Trams project. As part of the project a Melbourne tram was wrapped in an artistic design of Cattapan's.

Cattapan was the subject of the 2016 Archibald Prize finalist Benjamin Aitken's work Portrait of my mentor (Jon Cattapan and self). Aitken stated that Cattapan had "become something of a mentor" and that the two artists have a "unique relationship" given their difference in tertiary education. The two artists subsequently collaborated in 2018 on a series of ten paintings entitled Circling which exhibited at the La Trobe Art Institute

As of 2020 he exhibits with Station Gallery in Melbourne, Dominik Mersch Gallery in Sydney and Milani Gallery in Brisbane.

=== Career as an academic ===
Cattapan started his academic career as a lecturer in painting, drawing and printmaking at his Alma mater, RMIT, in 1982, before becoming a lecturer in painting in 1987 and leaving the university in 1989. Between 1992 and 1994 Cattapan was lecturer in foundation studies at the Australian National University before becoming a senior lecturer at the Victorian College of the Arts. Cattapan became an associate professor at the Victorian College of the Arts in 2007 and is currently a professor in visual art within the University of Melbourne's Faculty of Fine Art and Music at the Victorian College of the Arts after the two institutions merged in 2007. Cattapan also previously held the position of director at the Victorian College of the Arts.

== Influences ==
Cattapan has credited his high school art teacher Ralph Farmer as helping him to initially find his path as an artist and as encouraging him to switch to the RMIT school of Art stating Farmer "turned me onto what a life in art could look like".

For several years after graduating RMIT Cattapan's works were described as being typical to the what art historian Chris McAuliffe termed a "consistent accent" of RMIT graduates.

Cattapan was interviewed in 2016 on James Ballard's novel The Drowned World stating that after first reading it he understood it as "a very prescient book" which "has stayed with me". Cattapan elaborated that he interpreted a strong sense of instability in The Drowned World stating that in the book "everything is on the verge of sliding away". Cattapan's series of work The City Submerged can be linked to his interpretation of The Drowned World through the series' watery washes and its focus on dystopia.

== Artistic style ==
=== Early painting and prints ===
In the late 1970s Cattapan became involved with the punk rock scene in St Kilda. As Cattapan notes:

You had one café that everyone went to. The Galleon, upstairs in Acland Street. And if you went there, you'd be guaranteed to bump into half a dozen people from different sorts of art forms. So by osmosis, I suppose, you started to take on other people's ideas and predilections.

This involvement with the punk rock scene led Cattapan to begin to explore notions of geographical and social territories. McAuliffe has also noted that the punk rock scene legitimized Cattapan's more raw and emotional early style.

Connections have been drawn between Cattapan's early works, with their exploration of night-life and prostitution in St Kilda, and the work of artist Albert Tucker who explored similar themes in his Images of Modern Evil series, also in St Kilda.

=== Cityscapes and the urban landscape ===
Cattapan's work has been described as taking on a data-scape style and as a crossover between data-visualisation and the visual landscape and he has been noted for his interest in the post-modern city. Artist and critic John Conomos is quoted in the Sydney Morning Herald as saying "His swirling atmospherics suggest the romanticism of Turner's landscapes and Whistler's nocturnes".

Several of Cattapan's notable city-scape works are held in the collections of major Australian galleries including Possible Histories which is held in the collection of the National Gallery of Australia and The Melbourne Panels, held in the collection of the National Gallery of Victoria

=== War art and night vision ===
During his deployment as the 63rd Australian war artist, Cattapan began to experiment with night-vision equipment. In his words:

Using an amalgam of local and global environments to test ways of picturing gatherings or mapping territories has been at the heart of my practice. In Timor-Leste, that was brought to bear through the lens of the night-vision monocle I was given.

The use of night-vision equipment was a continuation of Cattapan's previous interest in the nocturnal and in the use of digital technologies in his work process. Cattapan's work during and after his deployment conveyed notions of surrealism and voyeurism. By using mono-print Drawings in conjunction with digital photographs, Cattapan's Carbon group create an imaginative retelling of events that he witnessed in Timor-Leste. Cattapan also states that it was his intention to depict the Australian army's relations with the local Timorese people.

=== Post-war art style ===
In 2014, art critic Sasha Grishin described Cattapan's work as "accessible, but simultaneously also mysterious and hinting at a different level of existence". Grishin has also noted Cattapan's interest in information systems and surveillance technology. After returning from Timor-Leste, Cattapan began to experiment with dripping paint in the background of his works. Eyeline magazine interpreted this as a reaction to the instability of the 21st century and offered multiple different suggestions of the purpose and meaning of this change in technique.

== Awards ==
- 1996: John McCaughey Memorial Art Prize, NGV
- 2013: Bulgari Art Award

== Major collections ==
Cattapan's work is held in a large number of public collections, including:

- National Gallery of Victoria
- Art Gallery of New South Wales
- Queensland Art Gallery
- National Gallery of Australia
- Parliament House, Canberra
- Museum of Contemporary Art Australia
- Heide Museum of Modern Art

== See also ==
- Howard Arkley
- Gareth Sansom
- Ben Quilty
- Sally Smart
- Heather Shimmen
