= Lesley Dumbrell =

Australian artist

Lesley Dumbrell, born on 14 October 1941 in Melbourne, is an Australian artist known for her precise abstract geometric paintings, and was a pioneer of the Australian Women's Art Movement of the 1970s. She became known as 'one of the leading artists in Melbourne to adopt the international styles of colour field and hard-edged abstraction'. Dumbrell's first major retrospective was held at Art Gallery of New South Wales in 2024.

== Education ==
Between 1958 and 1962 Dumbrell studied painting, printmaking and sculpture at the Royal Melbourne Institute of Technology and graduated with a Diploma of Art (Painting). Between 1966 and 1968 she was a teacher at RMIT in the Art Department. In 1977 she was Artist in Residence at Monash University and from 1980-1985 was Part-time Lecturer (Painting) at the Victorian College of the Arts Melbourne.

== Artistic practice ==
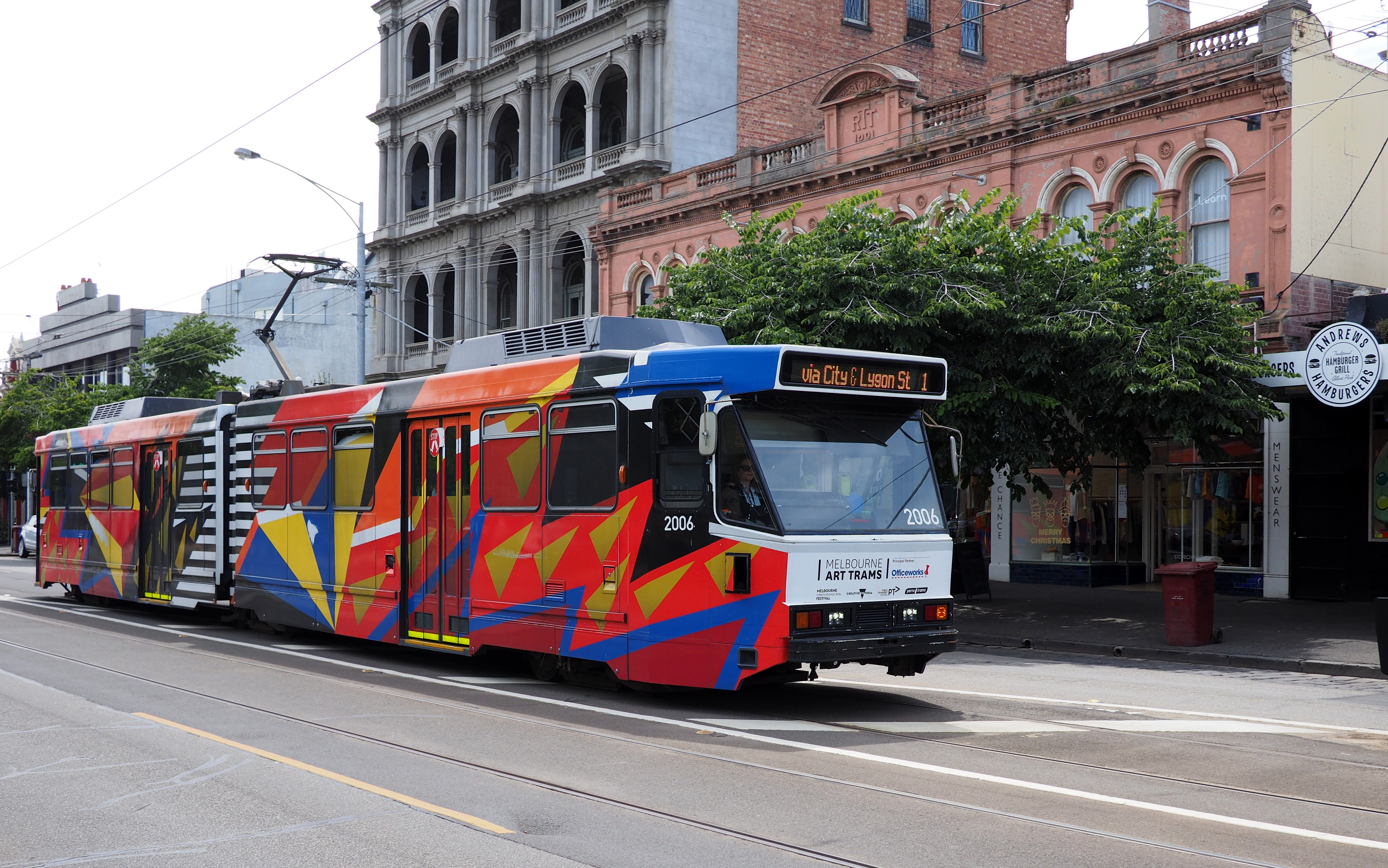
One of the Melbourne Art Trams with a design by Dumbrell in 2020

Dumbrell has contributed to the Australian and international arts scene and is known for her geometric abstraction paintings.

She was influenced by Piet Mondrian, and Wassily Kandinsky's 1910 treatise, Concerning the Spiritual in Art, which she read during her studies. In 1966 she became interested in colour field painting, abstract art, optical art and the work of Bridget Riley, and at this time Dumbrell began to use Liquitex acrylic paint. She works in a very precise way, begins with preliminary drawings on paper planning the work very carefully before commencing the painting itself. Her triptych February (1976) took about 6 months to complete.

Dumbrell uses colour and line to create optical effects which often allude to the natural elements of wind, fire, rain and earth, conveying the illusion of movement for example the tonal effect in Ripple (1972) and the movement of winds in Foehn (1975) and Zephyr (1975), which she says were to do "with the movement part of wind, but also the intangibleness of it."

About the optical element of art Dumbrell said " It's always been there but it's never really been emphasised and then suddenly a group of artists were emphasising not just another style but a fundamental element in painting and bringing to the fore and making it the strongest part of the work. That seemed to me to be a really innovative development."

The screenprint Azzuium (1987) forms part of her 'shape painting' series which marked a radical shift in her practice between 1983-1990.

In 1986 her watercolours were exhibited in the Colour and Transparency show at the National Gallery of Victoria In 1990 she moved to Thailand which added a visual complexity to her work and she now shares her time between Thailand and Victoria.

In 1986 Dumbrell was a featured guest artist for the Melbourne Art Tram series and in 2019 was invited to recreate her 1986 art work on a Melbourne tram.

== Contributions in Arts Feminist Activities ==
Lesley Dumbell is a pioneer of the Australian Women's Art Movement of the 1970s and has been involved for years in arts feminist activities. Dumbell worked with Erica McGilchrist, Kiffy Carter and Meredith Rogers at the Ewing and George Paton Galleries on establishing networks among women artists in Melbourne. Dumbrell co-founded the Women's Art Register in Australia, a 'collection of national significance', which aims 'to document and preserve the artistic contributions of Australian women and to support and promote them'.

== Collections ==
Her works are held in major collections in Australia, including the National Gallery of Australia, National Gallery of Victoria, Art Gallery of New South Wales, the Queensland Art Gallery, National Australia Bank, Federation University Australia and Artbank.

== Exhibitions ==
In 1969 the Bonython Gallery in Sydney hosted Dumbrell's first solo exhibition, alongside her husband Lenton Parr, Bryan Westwood, and Don Driver. Critic Donald Brook described her 'ambiguous abstract figures': "Their subdued tonality coaxes the eye with a persuasive gentleness that is surprisingly agreeable after so much occular [sic] assault by painting of this kind."

In 2023 Dumbrell was part of Melbourne Now at the National Gallery of Victoria.

The exhibition Thrum at the Art Gallery of New South Wales in 2024 was the first state art museum survey of Dumbrell's work "this exhibition, spanning her five-decade career, showcases her unique visual language and mastery of colour, movement and rhythm".

Dumbrell widely in Sydney, Melbourne and Brisbane, and since 1990 has lived and worked between Thailand and Victoria, Australia.
