= Matthew Bird (architect) =

Australian architect, artist, and academic

- Born: Melbourne
- Education: RMIT University
- Occupation: Architect
- Practice: Studiobird

Matthew David Bird is an architect, artist and academic from Melbourne, Australia. He practices across a range of disciplines including interior design, set-design, sculpture, installation art and architecture. He is well known for his guerrilla-style installations, notably Alphaomega Apartment (2008) where he transformed a tiny rental apartment with reimagined prosaic materials and unbeknown to the owners.

Bird studied architecture at RMIT University and developed professionally in Melbourne's ‘ideas-lead’ architectural scene of Cassandra Fahey and ARM Architecture. Both were environments where research, creative thinking and what-if design established his interests in the unorthodox, pursuing speculative and culturally symbolic ideas. In 2008 Bird started his practice Studiobird and commenced a practice-based PhD at RMIT University under the supervision of Professor Leon van Schaik AO. Over the next four years Bird undertook a series of practice-based research projects including installation, scenography and sculpture that examined his methodologies and motivations.

In recent years Bird has expanded his practice incorporating photography, performance, video art, interactive sculpture and architecture and has presented works at international festivals, galleries and museums both nationally and internationally. Bird has exhibited commissioned works at the National Gallery of Victoria, Melbourne Festival, Museum of Old and New Art (MONA), and the Venice Architecture Biennale. His practice is recognised with numerous honours including a Green Room Award, Australian Interior Design Award and an Australian Institute of Architects VIC Award.

== Select Projects ==
Afterlife (2017) was specially designed for Office for Metropolitan Architecture's 2017 MPavilion to transform the interior into an interactive installation that invited audiences to experience an immersive and performative encounter with the afterlife. The installation was composed of a celestial field of reimagined jerrycans that produced chance and compositional harmonies via playful audience manipulation, and a series of commissioned performances in collaboration with composer Daniel Von Jenatsch, choreographic artist Phillip Adams and fashion designer Pia Interlandi.

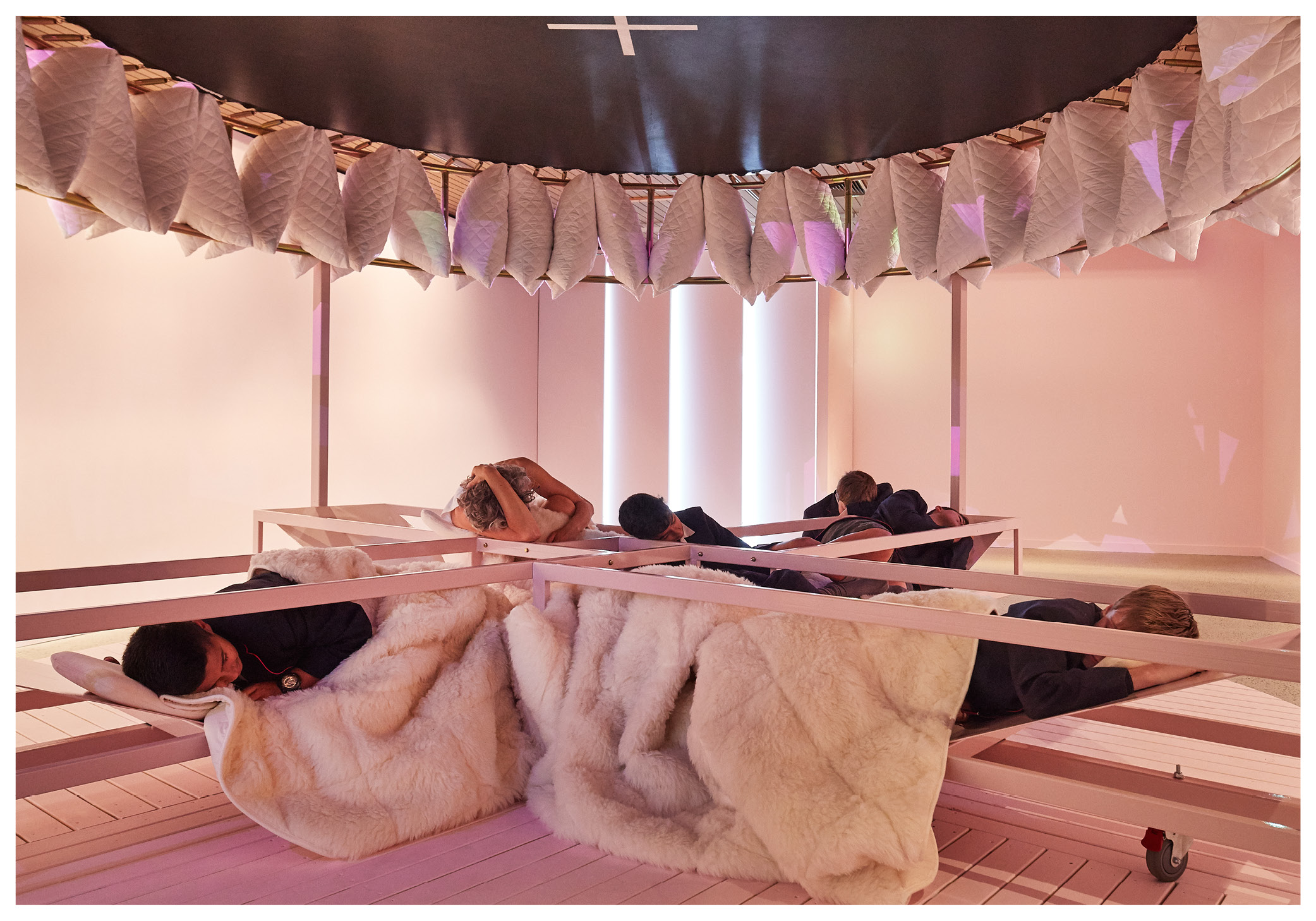
Dormitorium, 2017

Dormitorium (2017) was an interactive installation exhibited at McClelland Gallery + Sculpture Park (Langwarrin). The rotating work is presented as a communal sleep chamber and exploratory environment that encourages audiences to engage with a complexity of sensory propositions, from textures and materials to the immersive effects of moving light and sound technologies. Bird's research led to an extensive exploration in the changing traditions of bedchamber aesthetics and the potential these spaces have to profoundly affect the way we rest and rejuvenate.

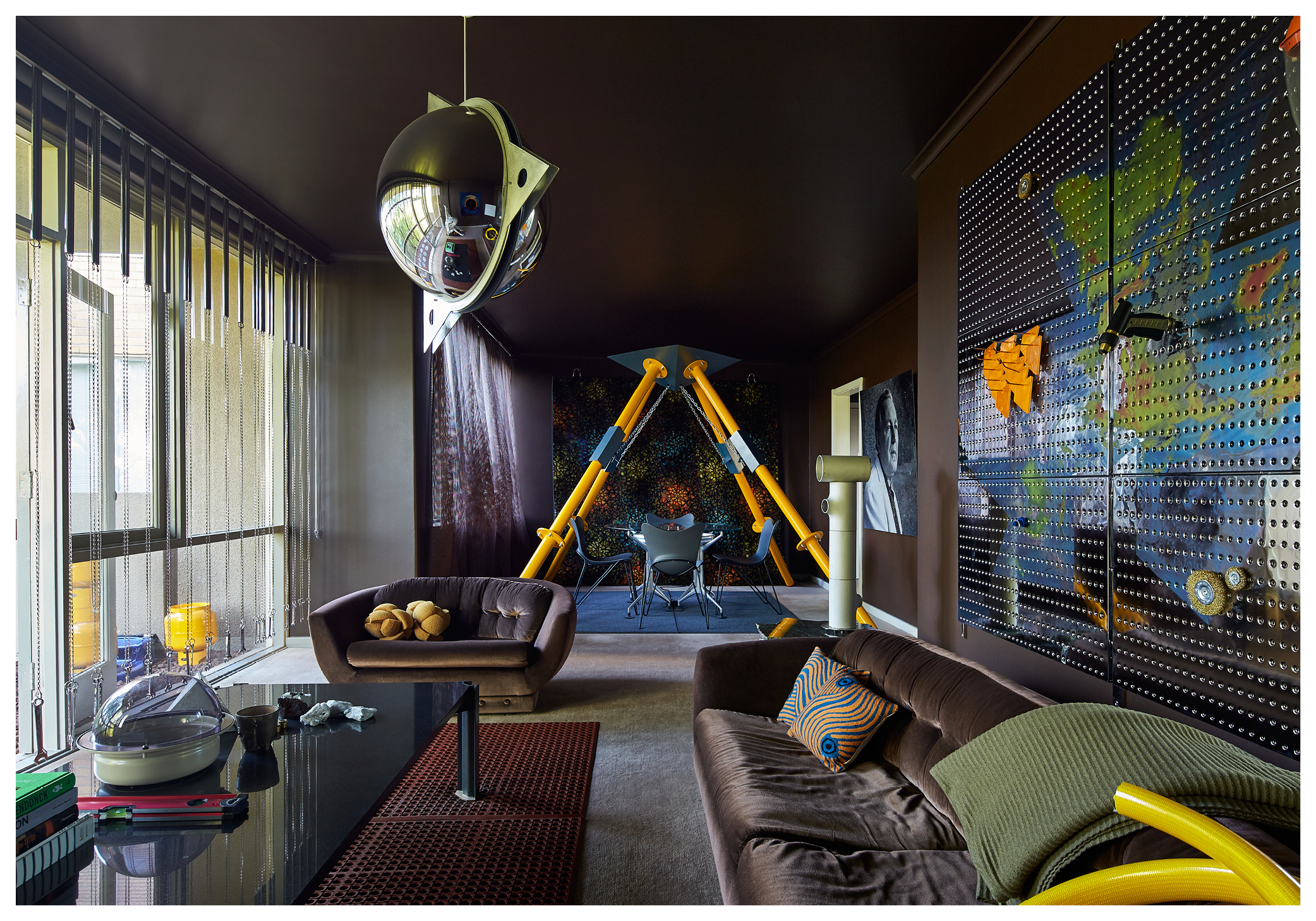
Theodore Treehouse, 2016

Theodore Treehouse (2016), an apartment fit-out in Melbourne features pop references and pushes the boundaries of decoration for a residential space. The spaces within the home are theatrical. With each room curated in equal measure as part installation exhibit, part stage, the interior contains a touch of the "whimsical voyeur," leaving us wanting to peep a little further. Theodore Treehouse uses a non-traditional delivery strategy. The execution and playful experimentation of this project contributes in an extremely positive and joyous way to contemporary decoration practice.

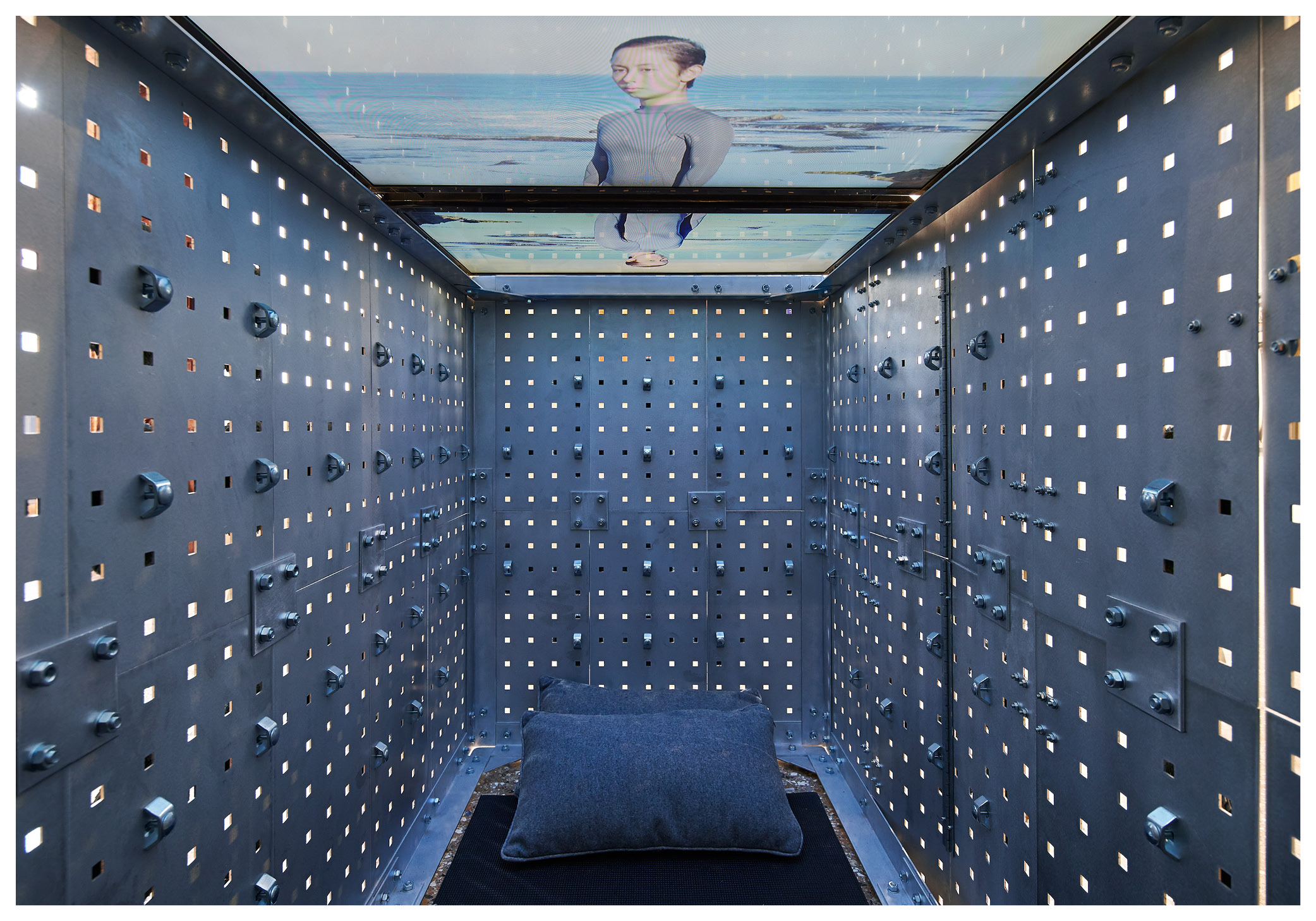
Sarcophagus, 2015

Sarcophagus (2016), exhibited at the 15th Venice Architecture Biennale invited audiences to experience an immersive environment of simulated sleep-states. This multidimensional architectural installation renders creative curiosities of biological and induced respite, challenging a range of aesthetic, cultural and behavioural concerns. Users are invited to physically occupy the installation offering an unusual interactive experience. The environment is dynamic with the interior transforming with the aid of a multichannel film, filling the intimate chamber with abstract cinematic and meditative sound and imagery.

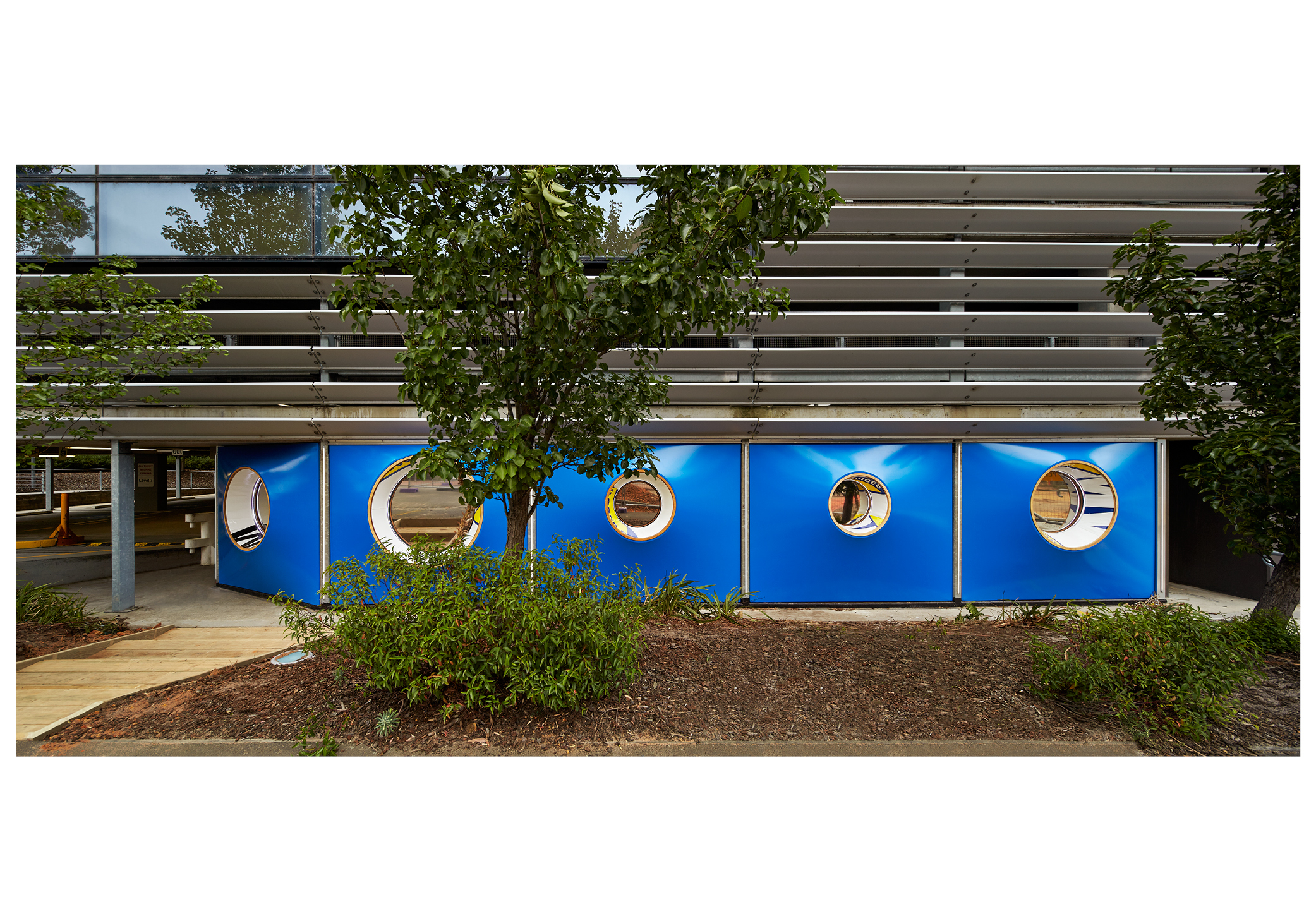
Hydronaut, 2015

Hydronaut (2015) by Matthew Bird & Mark Richardson Designer/ Maker is a semi-permanent, demountable structure housing an armament of security staff at the northwest edge of Monash University’s Caulfield campus. The building occupies five parking bays on the ground level of an existing car-park and provides a panopticonic point-of-presence in a location known for its security challenges.

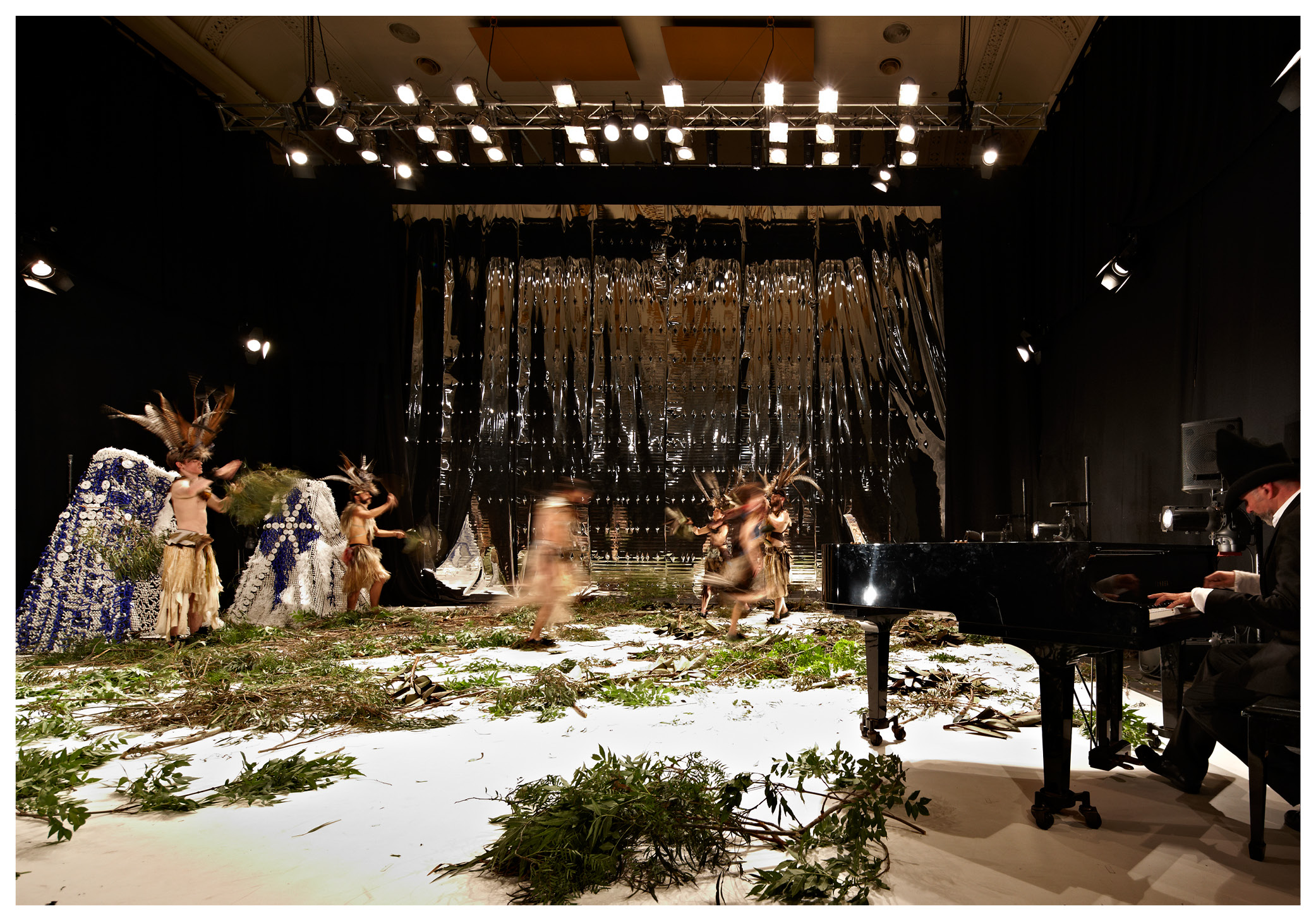
Aviary, 2011

Aviary (2011) was a set design for Phillip Adams Balletlab. The project premiered at Melbourne Festival, Arts House North Melbourne Town Hall 2011 and later toured at MONA FOMA, Theatre Royal Hobart in 2012 and Teo Otto Theater Remscheid Germany in 2014.

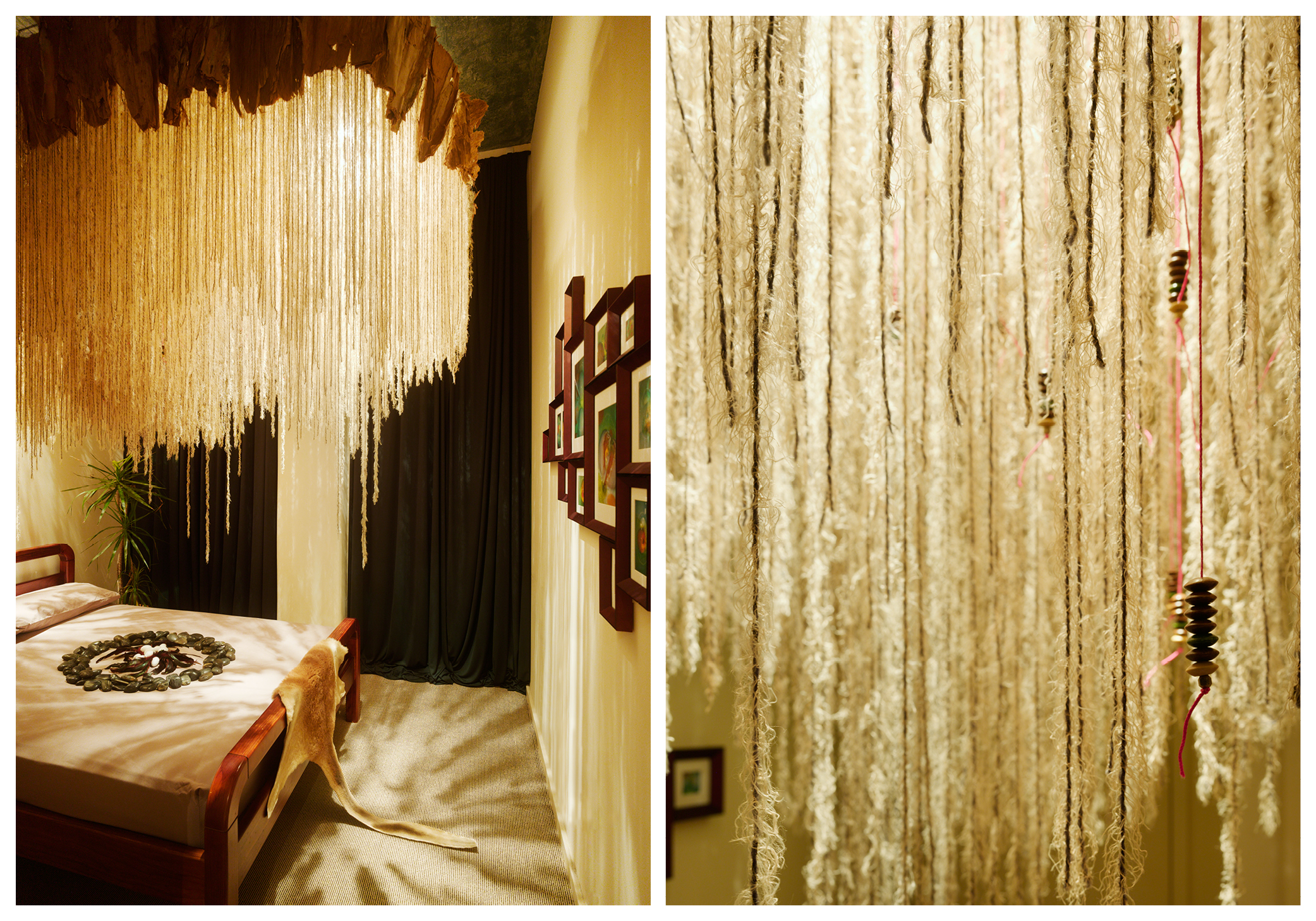
Alphaomega Apartment, 2008

Alphaomega Apartment (2008) transformed an ordinary Melbourne CBD rental apartment into a client-specific and personalised surreal escape. Drawing from an extreme range of references, from Michelangelo to the Aussie red kangaroo, a domestic retreat materialised.

== Awards ==
2016 Australian Interior Design Award: Winner for Theodore Treehouse

2016 Interior Design Excellence Award (IDEA): Highly Commended for Theodore Treehouse

2015 The Australian Institute of Architects Victorian Award: Winner for Hydronaut (w/ M. Richardson)

2015 The Australian Institute of Architects Victorian Award: Shortlist for Napoleon Perdis Chapel

2015 Interior Design Excellence Award (IDEA): Highly Commended for Hydronaut (w/ M. Richardson)

2015 The Interior Design Excellence Award (IDEA): Shortlist for Napoleon Perdis Chapel

2015 Good Design Australia Award: Good Design Selection for Hydronaut (w/ M. Richardson)

2012 Green Room Award: 1st Place, Design In Dance for Aviary (w/ T. Maticevski, R. Nylon, P. Adams, G. Brown)
