= List of University of the Arts (Philadelphia) alumni =

The University of the Arts (UArts) was an American private arts university in Philadelphia, Pennsylvania. The Philadelphia College of Art and the Philadelphia College of the Performing Arts merged to form the University of the Arts in 1987. Through its predecessor institutions, the university dates back to 1870. The university closed in 2024.

Following is a list of some of the notable alumni and faculty of the University of the Arts and its predecessor institutions. Former institution names include the College of Performing Arts of the University of the Arts, Hahn Conservatory of Music, Pennsylvania Museum and School of Industrial Art, Philadelphia College of Art, Philadelphia College of the Arts, Philadelphia College of the Performing Arts, Philadelphia Conservatory of Music, Philadelphia Museum College of Art, Philadelphia Museum School of Art, Philadelphia Museum School of Industrial Arts, Philadelphia Musical Academy, School of Applied Art, and the Zeckwer-Hahn Philadelphia Musical Academy.

== Academia ==
Name	Institution	Degree and year	Notability	Ref.
Lydia Artymiw	Philadelphia College of Art	1973	concert pianist and professor of piano at the University of Minnesota	
Katie Baldwin	University of the Arts	MFA 2004	printmaker and professor of art at the University of Alabama in Huntsville	
Dan Dailey	Philadelphia College of Art	BFA 1969	glass artist and professor emeritus at the Massachusetts College of Art	
Elliot del Borgo	Philadelphia Conservatory of Music	MM	composer and member of the faculty of the Crane School of Music 1966–1995	
Ruth E. Fine	Philadelphia College of Art	1962	painter and printmaker, college instructor, curator at the National Gallery of Art, and art historian	
Jodi Forlizzi	Philadelphia College of Art	BFA illustration	professor of human-computer interaction at Carnegie Mellon University	
George Greenamyer	Philadelphia College of Art	BFA 1963	professor at the Massachusetts College of Art	
Paul Hadley	Pennsylvania Museum and School of Industrial Art		watercolor and interior design faculty at the Herron School of Art and Design; designer of the Flag of Indiana	
Natalie Hinderas	Philadelphia Conservatory of Music		pianist, composer, and professor at Temple University	
Philippa Hobbs	University of the Arts		professor of art and head of printmaking at the Technikon Witwatersrand	
William Kelly	Philadelphia College of Art	1968	artist and dean of the School of Art at the Victorian College of the Arts	
James E. Lewis	Philadelphia College of Art	BFA 1949	chairman of the Morgan State University art department 1950–1986	
Alphonse Mattia	Philadelphia College of Art	BFA	furniture designer and professor at Rhode Island School of Design and Boston University	
Frederick Meyer	Pennsylvania Museum and School of Industrial Art	non-graduate	founding president of the School of the California Guild of Arts and Crafts	
Vincent Persichetti	Philadelphia Conservatory of Music	MM 1941; DMus 1945	classical music composer, chairman of the composition department at Juilliard School	
Katy Schimert	Philadelphia College of Art	BA 1985	visual artist and professor at the Rhode Island School of Design	
Dana P. Vaughan	Philadelphia Museum School of Art	1924	dean of the Rhode Island School of Design and Cooper Union	
Roland Wiggins	Philadelphia Conservatory of Music	non-graduate	music theorist, college professor, and director of the Luther P. Jackson Cultural Center at the University of Virginia	
Samuel P. Ziegle	Philadelphia Musical Academy		painter and chair of the art department at Texas Christian University	

== Architecture ==
Name	Institution	Degree and year	Notability	Ref.
Julian Abele	Pennsylvania Museum and School of Industrial Art	Certificate architectural drawing 1898	architect	
Alfred Bendiner	Philadelphia Museum School of Industrial Arts	1918	architect and artist	
Charles Barton Keen	Pennsylvania Museum and School of Industrial Art		architect	
Charles Klauder	Pennsylvania Museum and School of Industrial Arts		architect	
Hilyard Robinson	Pennsylvania Museum and School of Industrial Arts	non-graduate	architect	
Edgar Viguers See	Pennsylvania Museum and School of Industrial Arts	Certificate 1890	architect	

== Athletics ==
Name	Institution	Degree and year	Notability	Ref.
Paul Felder	University of the Arts	2008	professional MMA fighter with the Ultimate Fighting Championship	
Melvin Sutton	University of the Arts	MFA dance	cheerleader, member of the Carolina Topcats	
Anthony Watson	University of the Arts		skeleton racer and participant in the 2018 Winter Olympics	

== Business and nonprofit ==
Name	Institution	Degree and year	Notability	Ref.
Kenneth Carbone	Philadelphia College of Art	1975	chief creative director at the Carbone Smolan Agency	
Daniel Delaney	University of the Arts	BFA 2008	James Beard Foundation Award-nominated restaurateur	
Effie Kapsalis	University of the Arts	Masters industrial design and pervasive technology	head of web, new media, and outreach and chief of content and communications strategy at the Smithsonian Institution	
Noel Mayo	Philadelphia Museum College of Art	1960	founded Noel Mayo Associates, the first African American industrial design firm	
Jillian Patricia Pirtle	University of the Arts	BFA 2004	CEO of the Marian Anderson Museum and Historical Society	
Ron Pompei	Philadelphia College of Art	BFA	co-founder of Pompei A.D., a creative services firm	

== Government ==
Name	Institution	Degree and year	Notability	Ref.
Joseph Menna	University of the Arts	BFA	Chief Engraver of the United States Mint	
John Mercanti	Philadelphia College of Art		Chief Engraver of the United States Mint	
John R. Sinnock	Pennsylvania Museum School of Industrial Art	Certificate industrial drawing 1910, surface design and color 1911, constructive design and modelling 1912; Diploma art instruction 1913	Chief Engraver of the United States Mint	

== Literature ==
Name	Institution	Degree and year	Notability	Ref.
Margaret Ayer	Philadelphia Museum School of Industrial Arts		author and illustrator of children's books	
Mike Berenstain	Philadelphia College of Art		author and illustrator of children's books	
Stan and Jan Berenstain	Philadelphia Museum School of Industrial Art	1945	authors and illustrators of children's books	
Helen Borten	Philadelphia Museum College of Art		author and illustrator	
Aliki Brandenberg	Philadelphia Museum College of Art	1951	author and illustrator	
Mary Chalmers	Philadelphia Museum College of Art	painting	author and illustrator of children's books	
Barbara Chase-Riboud	Philadelphia Museum School of Art	non-graduate	novelist, known for Sally Hemings	
Du Chisiza	Philadelphia College of the Performing Arts	BFA	playwright, director, and politician	
Emily Hiestand	Philadelphia College of Art	graphic design	writer and poet	
Brian Pinkney	Philadelphia College of Art	BFA1983	author and illustrator of children's books; recipient of two Caldecott Honors, a Coretta Scott King Award, and the Boston Globe–Horn Book Award	
Jerry Pinkney	Philadelphia Museum School of Art	1939	author and illustrator of children's books	
Henry Clarence Pitz	Pennsylvania Museum School of Industrial Arts	1917	book author and illustrator, magazine editor, and educator	
Mary Brecht Pulver	School of Applied Art	BA, MA	writer of short stories and poetry	
Bernard Waber	Philadelphia College of Art		children's author known for Lyle, Lyle, Crocodile	

== Performing arts ==
=== Acting and performing ===
Name	Institution	Degree and year	Notability	Ref.
Maxwell Atoms	University of the Arts		animator and voice actor known for The Grim Adventures of Billy & Mandy	
Jabari Banks	University of the Arts		actor known for Bel-Air	
Irene Bedard	University of the Arts		actress	
Emory Cohen	University of the Arts	non-graduate	actor	
LaDeva Davis	Philadelphia Musical Academy	BMus	television presenter for the PBS series What's Cooking?	
Heather Donahue	University of the Arts	BFA 1996	actress known for The Blair Witch Project	
Kate Flannery	University of the Arts	BFA	actress known for The Office	
John Jesurun	Philadelphia College of Art	BFA 1972	theater director, playwright, media artist, and teacher	
LaChanze	University of the Arts		actress who received a Tony Award for Best Actress in a Musical	
John-Paul Lavoisier	University of the Arts	jazz percussion	film and television actor	
L Morgan Lee	University of the Arts		stage actress, nominated for a Tony Award for A Strange Loop	
Jared Leto	University of the Arts	non-graduate	Academy Award and Golden Globe Award-winning actor; member of Thirty Seconds to Mars	
Brad Loekle	University of the Arts		comedian	
Jayson Musson	University of the Arts	BFA photography	actor, writer, and producer of the video series His History of Art and member of Plastic Little	
Elise Neal	University of the Arts		actress known for Rosewood, Money Talks, and Scream 2	
Ana Ortiz	University of the Arts		actress known for Ugly Betty and Devious Maids	
Leslie Parrish	Philadelphia Conservatory of Music	non-graduate	actress	
KaDee Strickland	University of the Arts		actress known for The Grudge	

=== Choreography and dance ===
Name	Institution	Degree and year	Notability	Ref.
Ronne Arnold	Philadelphia Dance Academy	BMus dance 1959	dancer and choreographer	
Judith Jamison	Philadelphia Dance Academy		dancer and choreographer	
Donald T. Lunsford	University of the Arts	BFA modern dance	dancer, choreographer, and educator	
Revanta Sarabhai	University of the Arts	BFA	film and theater dancer	

=== Music ===
Name	Institution	Degree and year	Notability	Ref.
Bobby Timmons	Philadelphia Music Academy		Jazz pianist	

== Visual arts ==
=== Applied arts and design ===
The following alumni specialize in applied arts and design, including fashion, graphic, industrial, and interior design.

Name	Institution	Degree and year	Notability	Ref.
Richard Amsel	Philadelphia College of the Arts	1969	illustrator and graphic designer	
Vernon Howe Bailey	Pennsylvania Museum and School of Industrial Art	Certificate 1889	newspaper and magazine illustrator	
Ned Beard	Philadelphia Museum School of Industrial Art		graphic artist and cartoonist	
Harry Bliss	University of the Arts		cartoonist and illustrator; staff cartoonist at The New Yorker	
Noa Denmon	University of the Arts	BFA 2018; MAT	illustrator and recipient of the Caldecott Medal	
Irv Docktor	Philadelphia Museum School of Industrial		book and magazine illustrator	
Walter Hunt Everett	Pennsylvania Museum and School of Industrial Art		illustrator and educator	
Roger Hane	Philadelphia Museum School of Art	1961	illustrator	
Jack C. Harris	Philadelphia College of Art	BFA 1974	comic book writer for DC Comics	
Sol Hess	Pennsylvania Museum School of Industrial Design		typeface designer	
Trina Schart Hyman	Philadelphia Museum College of Art	non-graduate	children's book illustrator, recipient of the Caldecott Medal	
Harold Knerr	Pennsylvania Museum and School of Industrial Art		writer and artist of the comic strip The Katzenjammer Kids	
Beth Krush	Pennsylvania Museum and School of Industrial Art		children's books illustrator	
Joe Krush	Pennsylvania Museum and School of Industrial Art	Diploma illustration 1939	children's books illustrator	
Erika Lopez	University of the Arts		cartoonist and author	
Loza Maléombho	University of the Arts	BFA 2006	fashion designer	
Noel Mayo	Philadelphia College of Art	BS industrial design 1960	industrial designer and teacher	
Frank Mode	Philadelphia Museum School of Industrial Art		cartoonist for The New Yorker	
Shane O'Neill	University of the Arts	BFA	tattoo artist who won the first season of Ink Master	
Joseph Pennell	Pennsylvania Museum and School of Industrial Art		drafter, etcher, lithographer, and illustrator for books and magazines	
Herbert Pullinger	Pennsylvania Museum School of Industrial Arts		illustrator, printmaker, painter, and teacher	
Arnold Roth	Philadelphia Museum School of Industrial Art	illustration 1950	cartoonist	
Charles Santore	Philadelphia Museum School of Art	1956	illustrator of children's books	
Elisabeth Hallowell Saunders	Pennsylvania Museum and School of Industrial Art		botanical illustrator	
Cal Schenkel	Philadelphia College of Art	non-graduate	illustrator and graphic designer, specializing in album cover design	
Willi Smith	Philadelphia Museum College of Art		fashion designer	
Carson Van Osten	Philadelphia College of Art		writer and artist of Disney comics	
Alina Wheeler	Philadelphia College of Art	1970	graphic designer and brand consultant	

=== Contemporary and modern media ===
The following alumni specialize in contemporary and modern media, including digital art, filmmaking, photography, and video.

Name	Institution	Degree and year	Notability	Ref.
Bryan Brinkman	University of the Arts		animator	
Alex Da Cortev	University of the Arts	BFA printmaking 2004	conceptual artist	
Joe Dante	Philadelphia College of Art	1968	film director known for Gremlins and The 'Burbs	
Don Donaghy	Philadelphia Museum School of Art		photography	
Jim French	Philadelphia Museum School of Art	1954	erotic photographer and co-founder of Colt Studio Group	
David Graham	University of the Arts	BFA	photographer and academic	
G. H. Hovagimyan	Philadelphia College of Art	BFA sculpture 1972	artist specializing in experimental cross-media, new media art, and performance artist	
Mohammed Kazem	University of the Arts	MFA 2012	conceptual artist who works with found objects, photography, sound arts, and video	
George Krause	Philadelphia College of Art	1958	photographer	
David Lebe	Philadelphia College of Art	1970	photographer and educator	
Irving Penn	Pennsylvania Museum School of Industrial Art	Design Lab 1938	photographer	
Stephen Quay	Philadelphia College of Art	illustration 1969	annimator and filmmaker	
Timothy Quay	Philadelphia College of Art	film 1969	animator and filmmaker	
James Rolfe	University of the Arts		creator of Angry Video Game Nerd	
Ben Rose	Pennsylvania Museum and School of Industrial Art	1938	photographer and academic	
Ron Tarver	University of the Arts	MFA	photojournalist and chair of the art department at Swarthmore College	
Mark Wiener	Philadelphia College of Art		photographer, photojournalist, painter, and editor	
Deborah Willis	Philadelphia College of Art	BFA photography 1974	photographer and academic	

=== Decorative arts and crafts ===
Name	Institution	Degree and year	Notability	Ref.
Linda Lee Alter	Philadelphia College of Art	1961	fiber artist, painter, and art collector	
Melanie Bilenker	University of the Arts		craft artist known for hair jewelry	
Nicola D'Ascenzo	Pennsylvania Museum and School of Industrial Art		stained glass artist	
Wharton Esherick	Philadelphia Museum School for the Industrial Arts	non-graduate	sculptor and woodworker	
Robert Kulicke	Philadelphia College of Art		goldsmith, framemaker, and jeweler	
Frederick Harer	Pennsylvania Museum School of Industrial Arts		artist known as a gilder and framemaker	
Linda MacNeil	Philadelphia College of Art		metalsmith and jeweler	
Myra Mimlitsch-Gray	Philadelphia College of Art	BFA craft 1984	metalsmith, critic, and educator	
Winnie Owens-Hart	Philadelphia College of the Arts	BFA	ceramist and sculptor	
Emi Ozawa	University of the Arts		sculptor and furniture designer known for interactive woodworking	
Flo Perkins	Philadelphia College of Art	BA 1974	glass artist	
William Rhodes	University of the Arts	BFA 1989	sculptor, quilter, and mixed-media artist	
Olaf Skoogfors	Philadelphia Museum School of Art	1953	metalsmith, jeweler, educator, and academic administrator	
Samuel Yellin	Pennsylvania Museum School of Industrial Art		master blacksmith and teacher	

=== Fine arts ===
Name	Institution	Degree and year	Notability	Ref.
Phoebe Adams	Philadelphia College of Art	BFA sculpture 1976	biomorphic artist	
Dotty Attie	Philadelphia College of Art	BFA	painter and co-founder of A.I.R. Gallery	
Roland Ayers	Philadelphia College of Art	1954	watercolorist and printmaker	
Bo Bartlett	University of the Arts	non-graduate	contemporary realist painter	
Bascove	Philadelphia College of Art	BA	painter	
Ho Baron	Philadelphia College of Art		sculptor	
Beatrice Winn Berlin	Philadelphia College of Art		printmaker and painter	
Julius Bloch	Pennsylvania Museum and School of Industrial Art	Certificate industrial drawing 1906	social realist painter	
Samuel Joseph Brown Jr.	Pennsylvania Museum and School of Industrial Art		artist and educator	
Victoria Burge	University of the Arts	MFA	visual artist known for printmaking and drawing	
Norman Carton	Pennsylvania Museum School of Industrial Art		abstract expressionist painter and Works Progress Administration muralist	
Jonathan Lyndon Chase	University of the Arts	BFA 2012	multimedia artist known for collage	
Anne Chu	Philadelphia College of Art	BFA 1982	sculptor	
Claude Clark	Philadelphia Museum School of Industrial Art	Diploma 1939	artist, educator	
Louise D. Clement-Hoff	Philadelphia College of Art	BFA	painter who taught at the Fleisher Art Memorial for more than sixty years	
Gil Cohen	Philadelphia Museum School of Art	1953	aviation artist and academic	
David Dewey	Philadelphia College of Art	BFA 1968	landscape painter	
James Doolin		1954	painter and muralist	
Walter Edmonds	Philadelphia College of Art		muralist	
Wendy Edwards	University of the Arts Philadelphia	BFA 1927	painter	
Tatyana Fazlalizadeh	University of the Arts	BFA 2007	artist	
Katherine Levin Farrell	Philadelphia Museum School of Art		painter	
Beatrice Fenton	Pennsylvania Museum and School of Industrial Art		sculptor	
Louise Fishman	Philadelphia College of Art		abstract painter	
Foust	Philadelphia College of Art		linocut printmaker	
Allan Randall Freelon	Pennsylvania Museum and School of Industrial Art	Certificate industrial drawing 1913; Diploma art education 1916	artist and educator	
Meta Vaux Warrick Fuller	Pennsylvania Museum and School of Industrial	Diploma and Certificate art education 1898	sculptor, poet, painter, and theater designer	
Albert Gold	Philadelphia Museum School of Industrial Art	BA illustration 1938	artist and lithographer	
Cheryl Goldsleger	Philadelphia College of Art		contemporary painter	
Sidney Goodman	Philadelphia College of Art	1958	painter and educator	
Henry Theodore Hallman	Philadelphia Museum College of Art	BFA	painter and illustrator	
Joseph Hirsch	Pennsylvania Museum and School of Industrial Art	1931	painter, Works Project Administration muralist, and faculty of the Art Students League of New York and the National Academy of Design	
Philip Jamison	Philadelphia Museum School of Industrial Art	1950	watercolor artist	
Martina Johnson-Allen	University of the Arts	MFA art education and printmaking	artist, sculptor, and public school teacher	
James Paul Kocsis	Philadelphia College of Art	1958	painter	
Paul F. Keene Jr.	Philadelphia Museum School of Art	1942	artist and teacher	
Jacob Landau	Pennsylvania Museum School of Industrial Art	Diploma illustration, 1938	painter, printmaker, and illustrator	
Sean Landers	Philadelphia College of Art	BFA 1984	contemporary artist who works in painting, drawing, sculpture, video, and text	
Sarah McEneaney	University of the Arts		painter	
John Mecray	Philadelphia College of Art	1961	realist painter	
Jody Pinto	Philadelphia College of Art	1973	artist	
Salvatore Pinto	Pennsylvania Museum and School of Industrial Art		painter	
Stephen Powers	University of the Arts	non-graduate	graffiti artist	
Deborah Remington	Philadelphia Museum School of Industrial Art	non-graduate	abstract painter	
Anne Estelle Rice	Pennsylvania Museum School of Industrial Arts	Certificate and diploma for decorative painting and applied design 1897	painter	
William S. Rice	Pennsylvania Museum and School of Industrial Art		woodblock print artist and educator	
Antonius Roberts	Philadelphia College of Art	BFA	artist and gallarist	
Todd Schorr	Philadelphia College of Art	1976	pop surrealist artist	
Susan Gertrude Schell	Pennsylvania Museum and School of Industrial Art	1917	artist and educator	
Mary B. Schuenemann	Philadelphia College of Arts		watercolorist	
Charles Sheeler	Pennsylvania School of Industrial Art	Certificate industrial drawing 1901; Certificate decorative painting and applied art 1902	artist and painter	
Wini Smart	Philadelphia Museum College of Art		watercolorist and oil painter	
Dan Walsh	Philadelphia College of Art	BFA	painter and printmaker	
Martha Walter	Pennsylvania Museum School of Industrial Art	Certificate 1896	impressionist painter	
Elizabeth F. Washington	Pennsylvania Museum School of Industrial Art		landscape painter	
Neil Welliver	Philadelphia College of Art	BFA education 1953	painter	
Irene Zundel	Philadelphia College of Art	1981	sculptor, painter, and photographer	

== See also ==
- List of University of the Arts (Philadelphia) faculty
