= List of University of the Arts (Philadelphia) faculty =

The University of the Arts (UArts) was an American private arts university in Philadelphia, Pennsylvania. The Philadelphia College of Art and the Philadelphia College of the Performing Arts merged to form the University of the Arts in 1987. Through its predecessor institutions, the university dates back to 1870. The university closed in 2024.

Following is a list of some of the notable faculty and staff of the University of the Arts and its predecessor institutions. Former institution names include the College of Performing Arts of the University of the Arts, Hahn Conservatory of Music, Pennsylvania Museum and School of Industrial Art, Philadelphia College of Art, Philadelphia College of the Arts, Philadelphia College of the Performing Arts, Philadelphia Conservatory of Music, Philadelphia Museum College of Art, Philadelphia Museum School of Art, Philadelphia Museum School of Industrial Arts, Philadelphia Musical Academy, and the Zeckwer-Hahn Philadelphia Musical Academy.

== Administration ==
- Sean T. Buffington – president and CEO of the University of the Arts
- Joseph Castaldo – classical composer; president of the Philadelphia Musical Academy
- Frederick E. Hahn – violinist and composer, president and director of the Zeckwer-Hahn Philadelphia Musical Academy
- Thomas F. Schutte – president of the Philadelphia College of Art 1975–1983
- Camille Zeckwer (Philadelphia Musical Academy 1893) – pianist and composer; president of the Zeckwer-Hahn Philadelphia Musical Academy
- Richard Zeckwer – composer; founding director of the Philadelphia Musical Academy 1876–1917

== Humanities ==
- Lawrence Curry – historian and politician; history professor at the University of the Arts for 40 years
- Helen Drutt – art historian and gallery owner; art history instructor at the Philadelphia College of Art
- Elise Juska – novelist; founding director of the undergraduate creative writing program at the University of the Arts
- Camille Paglia – author and feminist social critic; professor of humanities and media studies at the University of the Arts 1984–2024

== Performing arts ==
- César Alvarez – composer, lyricist, and playwright; artist-in-residence at The University of the Arts and artistic director of Polyphone
- Theodore Antoniou – composer and conductor, taught at the Philadelphia Musical Academy
- William Ashbrook – musicologist, professor of opera at the Philadelphia College of the Performing Arts
- Jeanne Behrend – pianist, musicologist, educator, and composer
- Sam Dockery – hard bop pianist; taught at the University of the Arts
- Margaret Garwood – composer; lecturer in piano at the Philadelphia College of the Performing Arts 1953–1969
- Gabrielle Hunt – contralto; professor of voice at the Philadelphia Conservatory of Music
- Ada Turner Kurtz – singer; head of the vocal department at the Philadelphia Conservatory of Music
- Aaron Levinson – Grammy Award-winning record producer; master lecturer at the University of the Arts 2014–2019
- Forrest McClendon – actor; visiting assistant professor of musical theatre at the University of the Arts
- Tony Miceli – jazz vibraphonist; adjunct associate professor at the University of the Arts
- Lorne Munroe – cellist; taught at the Philadelphia Musical Academy
- Paul Nordoff – composer and music therapist; taught composition at the Philadelphia Conservatory 1937–1942
- Leo Ornstein – pianist and experimental composer; head of the piano faculty of the Philadelphia Musical Academy 1924–later 1950s
- Vincent Persichetti – classical music composer; head of the theory and composition departments of the Philadelphia Conservatory of Music 1939–1962, followed by the Philadelphia Musical Academy
- Ralph Peterson Jr. – jazz drummer, taught at the University of the Arts
- Edna Phillips – concert harpist; teacher at the Philadelphia Conservatory of Music 1932–1972
- LaVaughn Robinson – tap dancer; professor at the University of the Arts 1980–2008
- Eduard Steuermann – pianist; taught at the Philadelphia Conservatory of Music and the Philadelphia Musical Academy

== Visual arts ==
- Edna Andrade – painter; taught at the Philadelphia College of Art 1958–1982
- Rudi Bass – art director and designer; visiting professor at the Philadelphia College of Art
- Barbara Blondeau – photographer; chairman of the department of photography and film at the Philadelphia College of the Arts
- Alexey Brodovitch – photographer and art director of Harper's Bazaar; established the Department of Advertising Design at the Pennsylvania Museum School of Industrial Design
- Robert Byrd – children's book author and illustratort; taugh children's book illustration at the University of the Arts
- Alexander Stirling Calder – sculptor; taught modeling at the Pennsylvania Museum School of Industrial Art 1900–1906
- Sharon Church – jeweler, metalsmith; professor of the University of the Arts 1979–2014
- Gil Cohen – aviation artist, instructor at University of the Arts 1966–1986, and chair of the UArts Continuing Studies Illustration Program
- William Daley – ceramist, professor of ceramics and industrial design at the University of the Arts 1957–1990
- Nicola D'Ascenzo – stained glass artist; taught mural decoration at the Pennsylvania Museum and School of Industrial Art 1892–1894
- James DeWoody – painter; taught studio courses at the Philadelphia College of Art
- Inge Druckrey – graphic designer; professor of graphic design at the University of the Arts1994–2010
- Walter Erlebacher – sculptor; professor of sculpture and human anatomy at the University of the Arts for 25 years
- Walter Hunt Everett – illustrator; instructor of illustration at Philadelphia Museum School of Industrial Arts 1911–1915
- Ruth E. Fine – painter, printmaker, and museum curator; taught design, drawing and printmanking at the Philadelphia College of Art 1965–1969
- Louis Finkelstein – painter; lecturer at the Philadelphia College of Art
- S. Neil Fujita – graphic designer; taught design at the Philadelphia Museum College of Art
- Albert Gold – painter; professor and the head of the illustration department of the Philadelphia Museum School of Industrial Art 1945–1982
- Sidney Goodman – painter; instructor at the Philadelphia College of Art 1960–1978
- David Graham – photographer; photography professor at the University of the Arts
- David Hare – sculptor and painter; taught at the Philadelphia College of Art
- Sharon Horvath – painter; teacher at the University of the Arts
- James Paul Kocsis – painter; taught drawing and pictorial composition at the Philadelphia College of Art 1965–1967
- David Lebe – photographer; taught at the Philadelphia College of Art/University of the Arts 1972–1990
- E. B. Lewis – illustrator; taught illustration at the University of the Arts
- Mercedes Matter – painter; taught at the Philadelphia College of Art 1953–1963
- Noel Mayo – industrial designer; chair of the industrial design department at the Philadelphia College of Art
- Bruce Metcalf – artist, teacher at the University of the Arts
- Ray Metzker – photographer; professor and chairman of the photography and film department at the Philadelphia College of Art
- Ree Morton – visual artist; taught at the Philadelphia College of Art
- Thornton Oakley – artist and illustrator; head of the Department of Illustration at the Philadelphia Museum School of Industrial Art 1914–1936
- Henry Clarence Pitz – book author and illustrator, magazine editor; taught at Pennsylvania Museum School of Industrial Arts 1919, 1921–1922, 1934–1960 and director of its Illustration Department 1941–1960
- Mary Elizabeth Price (Pennsylvania Museum School of Industrial Art, Industrial Drawing Certificate 1898, normal certificate 1899, Certificate illustration 1900) – Impressionist painter
- Herbert Pullinger – illustrator and painter; taught at Philadelphia Museum School of Industrial Art 1923–1958
- John Rais – blacksmith and sculptor; senior lecturer at the University of the Arts 2004–2006
- Ben Rose – photographer; taught advertising photography and photography at Pennsylvania Museum and School of Industrial Art 1945–1950
- Judith Schaechter – glass artist, adjunct professor in the crafts department of the University of the Arts
- Susan Gertrude Schell – artist; taught at the Pennsylvania Museum and School of Industrial Art 1926–1957
- John R. Sinnock – chief engraver of the United States Mint; arts instructor at the Philadelphia Museum School of Industrial Art
- Olaf Skoogfors – metalsmith and jeweler; taught art education, silversmithing, and three-dimensional design at the Philadelphia Museum School of Art 1959–1975 and chair of the Crafts Department, 1971–1975
- Benton Murdoch Spruance – painter; chair of the Printmaking Department of the Philadelphia College of Art
- Lizbeth Stewart – ceramist; taught ceramics at the University of the Arts 1982–2012
- Shawn Theodore – photographer; was an associate adjunct professor at the University of the Arts
- Dana P. Vaughan – taught color and design at the Evening School of the Philadelphia Museum School of Art
- Samuel Yellin – master blacksmith, instructor at the Pennsylvania Museum School of Industrial Art 1907–1919
- Martha Zelt – printmaker and painter; taught printmaking at the Philadelphia College of the Arts 1969–1982

== See also ==
- List of University of the Arts (Philadelphia) alumni
