= Skoogfors =

Skoogfors is a surname. Notable people with the surname include:

- Leif Skoogfors (born 1940), American documentary photographer
- Olaf Skoogfors (1930–1975), Swedish artist, metalsmith and educator
