= Mark Mann =

Mark Mann may refer to:

- Mark Mann (artist) (born 1970), American artist
- Mark Mann (politician) (fl. 2010s–2020s), American politician
- Mark Simon Mann, portrait photographer and author of Movement at the Still Point: An Ode to Dance

== See also ==
- Marc Mann (fl. 1980s–2020s), American musician
- Marcus Mann (disambiguation)
