= Lorraine Shemesh =

American painter

- Born: Jersey City, New Jersey, United States
- Education: Tyler School of Art (MFA), Boston University (BFA)
- Known for: Painting, drawing, figurative art, ceramics
- Awards: National Academy of Design, Boston University, Rhode Island State Council for the Arts
- Website: Lorraine Shemesh

Lorraine Shemesh, Crescent, oil on canvas, 75" x 48.75", 2013. Collection of the Butler Institute of American Art.

Lorraine Shemesh is an American artist whose practice focuses on painting, drawing, and ceramics. Since the early 1990s, she has created investigations of the human form that balance contemporary realism with an abstract expressionist concern for gesture, rhythm and pattern. Her best-known series depict active swimmers in pools viewed from above and underwater or intertwined, costumed dancers set in ambiguous, compressed spaces. In the 2000s, her work has increasingly moved towards abstraction, with figures dissolving into faithfully rendered optical phenomena or geometric patterning. Describing these qualities, Art in America critic Jonathan Goodman wrote, "being true to nature enables Shemesh to record a dazzling array of painterly gestures, some of them squarely within the tradition of Abstract Expressionism ... Her use of abstract effects in the service of representation is striking and makes her art complex."

Shemesh's work has been exhibited at institutions including the San Francisco Museum of Modern Art, Bronx Museum of Art, National Academy of Design, Institute of Contemporary Art, Boston (ICA), Museum of the City of New York, and Musée de Carouge (Switzerland). Her work belongs to the public collections of the National Academy Museum, DeCordova Sculpture Park and Museum, and Rhode Island School of Design Museum, among others.

== Early life and career ==
Shemesh was born in Jersey City, New Jersey. As a child she studied ballet, an experience that would inform her later artwork, which explores human movement. She was classically trained in art in a multidisciplinary program at Boston University, earning a BFA in painting in 1971 and a summer fellowship at the Tanglewood Institute with painter Philip Pearlstein. She undertook graduate studies at the Tyler School of Art (MFA, 1973) in both Philadelphia and Rome, where her inspirations included artists such as Chaïm Soutine, Richard Diebenkorn and Edward Hopper.

After graduating, Shemesh began exhibiting and taught at the Rhode Island School of Design (RISD) and Amherst College between 1973 and 1981. She appeared in group shows at ICA Boston and the DeCordova Museum and solo shows at RISD (1976) and Alpha Gallery in Boston (1978) before joining the noted Allan Stone Gallery, where she had eight solo exhibitions between 1983 and 2009. She has also had solo exhibitions at the Butler Institute of American Art (2006), Gerald Peters Gallery (New York and Santa Fe; 2016, 2019 and 2024), and Dartmouth College (2021).

== Work and reception ==
Shemesh has worked in varied figurative modes and genres throughout her career, over time moving closer to abstraction. Her Pool and Dancer series are grounded in classical interests in human anatomy, musculature and movement. They explore the complex choreography of human connection, universal experiences of temporality and mortality, and relationships between the body and space, tension and tranquility, disjuncture and harmony. She balances these interests against formal concerns regarding gesture, abstract form, pattern, surface and paint handling. In later work and exhibitions, she has brought paintings, drawings and ceramics into dialogue, investigating movement and pattern through common motifs and related techniques that illuminate her overall production.

=== Early work (1980s) ===
Shemesh's early work included figurative drawings and pictorial quilts, Hopper-esque cityscapes and interiors, and still-life tabletop groupings of food and everyday objects, such as beach balls, flip-flop sandals, rubber gloves and women's bathing suits. Her still lifes consisted of graphite drawings and brightly colored oil paintings with a debt to Wayne Thiebaud that combined detailed, realist rendering with what Art in America's Carl Little called a sociocultural eye for excess and darker themes involving mortality, vulnerability and the "desperate sentimentality" of commonplace, non-elitist objects. Examples of this work include a grouping of candy boxes (Three Hearts) and rows of footwear whose wandering laces and multi-hued designs Little likened to a school of upward-wriggling tropical fish (Bowling Shoes).

=== "Painted Pools" ===
In the early 1990s, Shemesh turned to realistic, large-scale, immersive paintings of figures viewed from under water in swimming pools, often based on in-depth anatomical studies using dancers as models. At a distance, the paintings function as classical, figurative compositions of athletic figures—displaying observational powers critics compared to George Bellows's boxers—which close up dissolve into neo-impressionist investigations of pure light or lyrical abstraction. They frequently employ anatomical foreshortening and the natural magnification caused by the changing undulation of water to energize the painting space, while exploiting the weightless quality of water to evoke bodily and out-of-body experience, transcendence of limitations, slowed time, dream and dance. Critics suggested that these expressive qualities opened the paintings to diametrically opposite interpretations, as sensually pleasurable experiences or as more disquieting dramas of disorientation, isolation, silence or danger, particularly in later works of solitary, often cropped or truncated figures whose faces are not visible.

Lorraine Shemesh, Lock, oil on canvas, 46.75" x 78.25", 2009.

The series initially engaged in a dialogue involving commonplace swimming-pool action above and below the water line, emphasizing the distortions of form and color on swimmers' submerged bodies (e.g., Twist and Shout and Tubes, 1993). By the end of the decade, however, Shemesh was increasingly influenced by painters such as Jackson Pollock and loosened her control of the work, allowing the once-solid, contained figures to be fragmented into abstract optical stimuli—rippling striations, refracted details, and passages of blazing light and incandescent color that writers likened to the work of J. M. W. Turner and Claude Monet. These paintings also adopted more geometric, circular compositional strategies, either in their figurative arrangements (Loop and Link, 1999) or by depicting inflatable tubes through which various body parts emerged (Ring, 1997).

Shemesh's 2000 show, "Water-Works," consisted of large oils and gestural studies that critics wrote, demonstrated intense, equal interest in the twisting, bending and contorting of the athletic body and the distortions of never-still water. The New York Times's Ken Johnson described the paintings as swimmers with backs arched, grasping one another's feet to form "a living yin-yang symbol" around the canvas perimeter, "immersed in luminous, painterly flux." In the later shows "Breaking the Surface" (2006) and "Inside Out" (2016), Shemesh pushed the dissolution of form further in works such as Amoeba (2005), Spots (2012) and Crescent (2013), with figures completely melting into passages of pure abstract form, pattern and brushwork.

=== Dancers ===
In the late 2000s, Shemesh produced a new body of work, her "Intersections" series (2007–21): large works that departed from her buoyant Pool figures by depicting anonymous, coupled dancers locked in tight struggle or clutches (Tangle, 2010; Lock, 2009). The paintings merged a realist attention to musculature and shadows with abstract geometry that some critics likened to the work of Sean Scully. Completely covered in hooded costumes of wide black and white bands, the dancers enacted elaborate, sensual poses that Shemesh set against hazy, neutral grounds and contained within shallow, near-claustrophobic spaces comprising the picture plane. The patterned costumes and juxtapositions of arms and legs synthesized the bodies into larger, seemingly imagined forms with a lively, rhythmic play of abstract shapes; the patterns were influenced by African textiles (e.g., Kuba cloth), as well as mechanical objects like bicycle gears, wheels, and zippers. Critics such as Donald Kuspit described paintings like Checkmate (2008) as "fraught with tension" and "unsettling" in their existential ambiguity. It depicted seated figures with bent heads and shoulders and pulled back arms—suggesting captivity—and tightly conjoined, outstretched legs spanning the center of the canvas that created a checkerboard pattern.

The dancer paintings in Shemesh's "The Space Between Us" series (2014–21) employed warmer colors inspired by the landscape surrounding Santa Fe, New Mexico. For example, Attached (2018) recalled adobe architecture, with a circular arrangement of intertwined figures set off by a surrounding burnt orange square and a blinding white center area underscoring the void between them; in Puzzle (2014), pale yellow and black patterns projected upon and behind a spiral-like figure arrangement suggested fragmented, jigsaw shadows and the diamond patterns of a harlequin costume, conveying a playful, free-associative quality. Writer Molly Boyle contended that these canvases interrogated ideas of connection, "spark[ing] an exploration of the psychology of one human form in relation to another, and the relative distances and intimacies between the selves housed in each body."

Lorraine Shemesh, Black & White Tilted Nerikomi Vessel, porcelain, 4.5" x 11" x 7.5", 2011.

=== Ceramics ===
Beginning in 2016, Shemesh began to exhibit paintings and drawings with porcelain and stoneware vessels that shared preoccupations with pattern, geometry, twisting and interlocking forms, and metamorphoses of shape and light from figuration to abstraction. She created the clay works using the time-consuming Japanese techniques of Nerikomi and Neriage, interlacings of different colored clays which are then hand built like layered geologic formations, or worked on a banding wheel. Works such as Black & White Tilted Vessel (2011) employed repetitions and deviations of patterns and flowing shapes seemingly lifted from her pool images, while Large Black & White Woven Neriage Cylinder (2017) engaged the dancer paintings. Describing the interaction between mediums, A. Bascove wrote, "the sensation of impassioned movement, often with a precarious edge, abounds ... the gravitational pull of order into chaos becomes a meditation on the passage of time and the keenly felt circumstances of life itself." Shemesh's ceramic work is featured in the book, Nerikomi: The Art of Colored Clay by ceramicist Thomas Hoadley.

== Recognition ==
Shemesh's work belongs to the public collections of the Butler Institute of American Art, Danforth Art Museum, DeCordova Museum, Hood Museum of Art, National Academy of Design, Museum of the City of New York, and Rhode Island School of Design Museum, among others. She has received a Rhode Island State Council for the Arts grant, a distinguished alumni award from the School of Visual Arts, Boston University, and artist residencies from Dartmouth College, the Watershed Center for the Ceramic Arts, and Yaddo. In 2004, she was elected to the National Academy of Design.
