= Miller Gallery =

Miller Gallery may refer to:

- Miller ICA at Carnegie Mellon University, a contemporary art gallery in Pittsburgh, Pennsylvania
- Laurence Miller Gallery, in New York City
- Robert Miller Gallery in New York City
