= Julie Mack =

American photographer (born 1982)

Julie Mack (born 1982), who also works under the name J. Mack, is an American photographer and artist based in Brooklyn, New York. Her staged photographs examine family portraiture and the representation of the American family. Her work is held in the permanent collection of the Museum of Fine Arts, Boston.

== Early life and education ==
Mack was born in 1982. She received a Bachelor of Fine Arts in photography from Parsons School of Design in 2005.

== Work ==
Mack works in constructed portraiture, staging photographs that use conventions associated with family snapshots and domestic portraiture. Her photographs often depict posed family groups in homes, cars, and other everyday settings. Her photograph Self-portrait with family in SUV, Michigan (2007) depicts Mack and members of her family seated inside a parked sport utility vehicle, photographed through the windshield; it was acquired by the Museum of Fine Arts, Boston. Mack's photographs were discussed in coverage of the Museum of Fine Arts exhibition (un)expected families, which examined changing representations of family in photography.

== Exhibitions ==
Mack had a solo exhibition, On the Move, at Laurence Miller Gallery in New York in 2007. Her work was included in the group exhibition (un)expected families at the Museum of Fine Arts, Boston (2017–2018), and in The Kids Are All Right, a touring exhibition on family photography shown at the Addison Gallery of American Art and other venues in 2012–2013.

== Collections ==
Mack's work is held in the permanent collection of the Museum of Fine Arts, Boston.
