= Corzo (surname) =

Corzo is a surname. Notable people with the surname include:

- Aldo Corzo (born 1989), Peruvian footballer
- Juan Corzo (1873–1941), Spanish–Cuban chess master
- Juan Manuel Corzo Román (born 1961), Colombian lawyer and politician
- Miguel Angel Corzo (born 1942), Mexican-born American arts administrator
- Ramiro Suárez Corzo (born 1960), Colombian politician
- Silvia Corzo (born 1973), Colombian lawyer and presenter
- Teófilo Torres Corzo (born 1946), Mexican politician
