= Sean T. Buffington =

American academic administrator

Sean Buffington
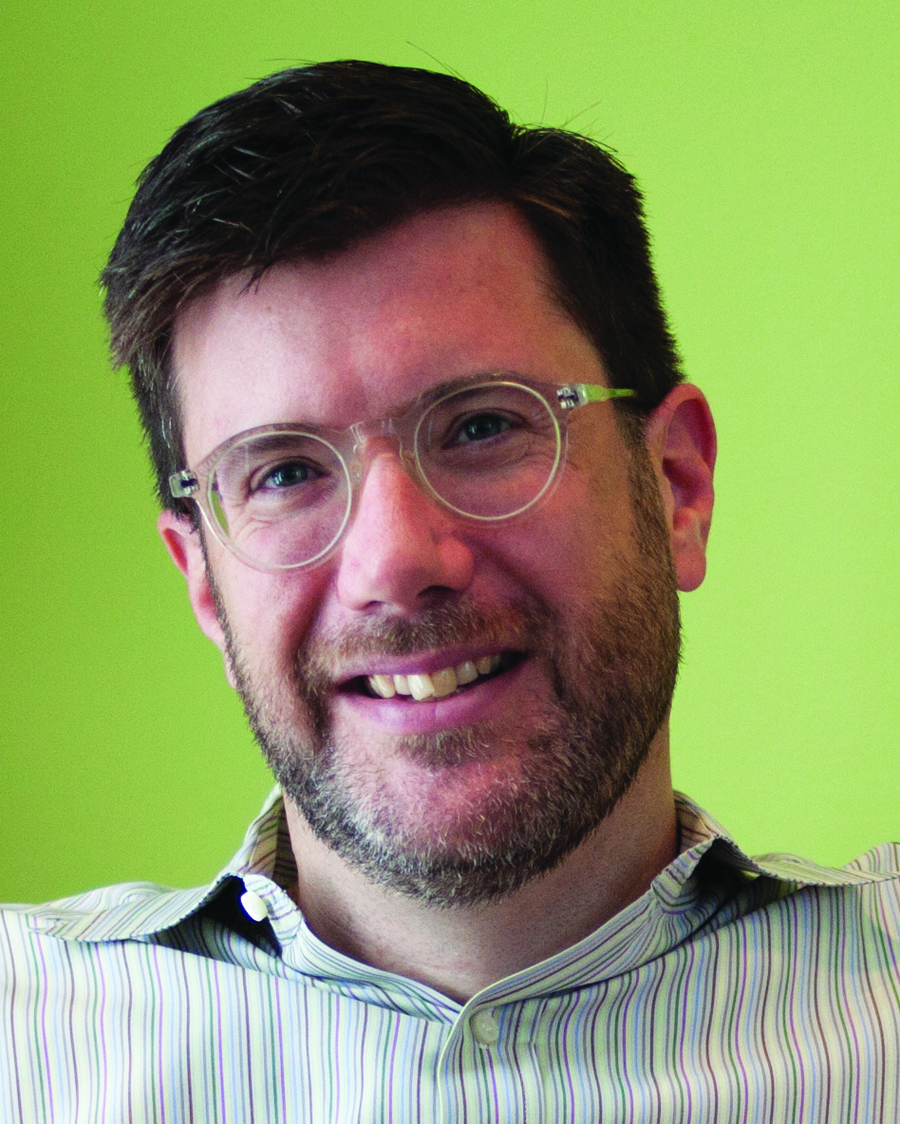

President of the University of the Arts
- In office August 15, 2007 – December 2014
- Preceded by: Miguel Angel Corzo
- Succeeded by: Kirk Pillow (acting)

Personal details
- Born: La Plata, Maryland, U.S.
- Education: Harvard University (BA); University of Michigan (MA)

Sean T. Buffington is vice president of the Henry Luce Foundation, and former president and CEO of the University of the Arts in Philadelphia, Pennsylvania.

== Biography ==
Sean Buffington graduated summa cum laude in English and American literature and Afro-American studies from Harvard College in 1991. He then went on to earn his Master of Art degree in American culture from the University of Michigan in 1994.

Buffington returned to Harvard in 1994 as an administrator in the Harvard Alumni Association and University Development Office. From 1999 to 2002, he served as Assistant Provost for Interfaculty Programs. In 2002 he was appointed Deputy Chief of Staff to the president and Provost, and in 2005 he was promoted to Associate Provost for Arts and Culture. From 2007 through 2014, he served as President of the University of the Arts. He joined the Henry Luce Foundation in 2015 as vice president.

He is openly gay.
