= Marcus Mann =

Marcus Mann may refer to:

- Marcus Mann (basketball) (born 1973), American basketball player
- Marcus Mann (footballer) (born 1984), German footballer

== See also ==
- Marc Mann, American musician
- Mark Mann (disambiguation)
