= Les Krims =

American photographer (born 1942)

Leslie Robert Krims (born August 16, 1942) is an American conceptualist photographer living in Buffalo, New York. He is noted for his carefully arranged fabricated photographs (called "fictions"), various candid series, a satirical edge, dark humor, and long-standing criticism of what he describes as leftist twaddle.

== Life ==
Les Krims was born in Brooklyn, New York. Krims studied at New York's Stuyvesant High School. Richard Ben-Veniste ("Benti," as he was called in home-room at Stuyvesant), famous for prosecuting Richard Nixon, and A.D. Coleman, the former photography critic for The New York Times, were two of Krims' Stuyvesant classmates. Krims studied art at The Cooper Union for the Advancement of Science and Art, and Pratt Institute. For the last 42 years he has taught photography, first at the Rochester Institute of Technology, and for the last 40 years at Buffalo State College, where he is a professor in the Department of Fine Arts. In describing his staged pictures, and the parodies of candid journalistic propaganda photographs he makes, Krims said, "It is possible to create any picture one imagines." Krims's latest project is a website (leskrims.com) where he sells archival ink jet prints of a wide selection of his pictures. Krims claims new digital printing technology and capitalism make it possible to "own the means of production, rendering moot wall-to-wall delusional Marxist posturing in the culture community."

== Books of photography ==
Les Krims has published numerous offset works. Two of these, "Fictcryptokrimsographs," and "Making Chicken Soup," were published by Humpy Press, which he founded and incorporated in the mid-1970s, and has since been dissolved. Krims has also published original print portfolios such as, "Idiosyncratic Pictures," and "Porsch Rainbows." Most recently (November 2005), a Photo Poche monograph, "Les Krims," edited by Robert Delpire, with an introduction by Bernard Noel, was published by Actes Sud, in France.

In The Little People of America (1971), Krims received permission to photograph people belonging to a national organization founded by the actor Billy Barty, called "The Little People of America." Many of the pictures were made at national conventions of the L.P.A, in Oakland, CA, and Atlanta, GA. Krims sought to show that the people he photographed were brave, normal people, having more in common with the Mid-West than the Upper-West-Side, unlike the way the dwarf was portrayed in the history of art or contemporary photographs.

In his portfolio The Deerslayers (1972), Krims took pictures of deer hunters who had voluntarily stopped at "deer check stations" so that NYS conservationists could examine the general health of the deer. Pictured posing with their kills, Krims suggested the hunters had much in common with performance art, and odd manifestations of sculpture. He also attempted to underscore the American nature and long tradition of deer hunting as one aspect of a criticism of animal rights and anti-Vietnam War activists.

In The Incredible Case Of The Stack O'Wheat Murders (1972), Krims both parodies forensic photography, and points to it as a remarkable archive of incredible and moving images (the various, successful CSI television series attests to his prescience). In each "Wheats" crime scene, a Stack O'Wheats (pancakes) is placed near each "victim" (he used friends and family to pose for the pictures). Each stack is topped with pats of butter and syrup, the number of pancakes in the stack signifying the number of the crime. Hershey's chocolate syrup was used to simulate blood in the photos, which was formed into words and celestial shapes. Krims originally included 8 ounces of Hershey's syrup in a heat sealed plastic bag with the original print portfolio, as well as "enough pancake mix to make one complete Stack O' Wheats".

In Making Chicken Soup (1972), Krims published pictures of his mother preparing her traditional chicken soup recipe, while nude. These pictures were published as a small book, some say giving rise years later to the popular Chicken Soup series. The book contained a dedication, which underscored the real point of the satire: "This book is dedicated to my mother and concerned photographers, both make chicken soup." Krims felt that "socially concerned" photography was a palliative, just as chicken soup was—in the long run, an ineffective remedy for serious disease.

In Fictocryptokrimsographs, published in 1975, Krims used a Polaroid SX-70 camera to make a series of 40, titled pictures. The SX-70 was chosen, because of the ability to literally move and work the not yet dry, viscous, film emulsion much like paint after the picture developed. Included are various odd and humorous pictures, which are often puns or parodies of fashion trends.

Krims has also steadily been adding pictures to an overarching project spanning three decades called, "The Decline of the Left."

In 2004, he had a two-month exhibition at Laurence Miller Gallery in NYC titled "Fictions 1969-1974". In 2007, he had a retrospective at Galerie Baudoin Lebon in Paris and has been part of a dozen other group exhibitions of photography in the years 2000–2007 with others planned.
