= Massachusetts School of Art =

- U.S. National Register of Historic Places
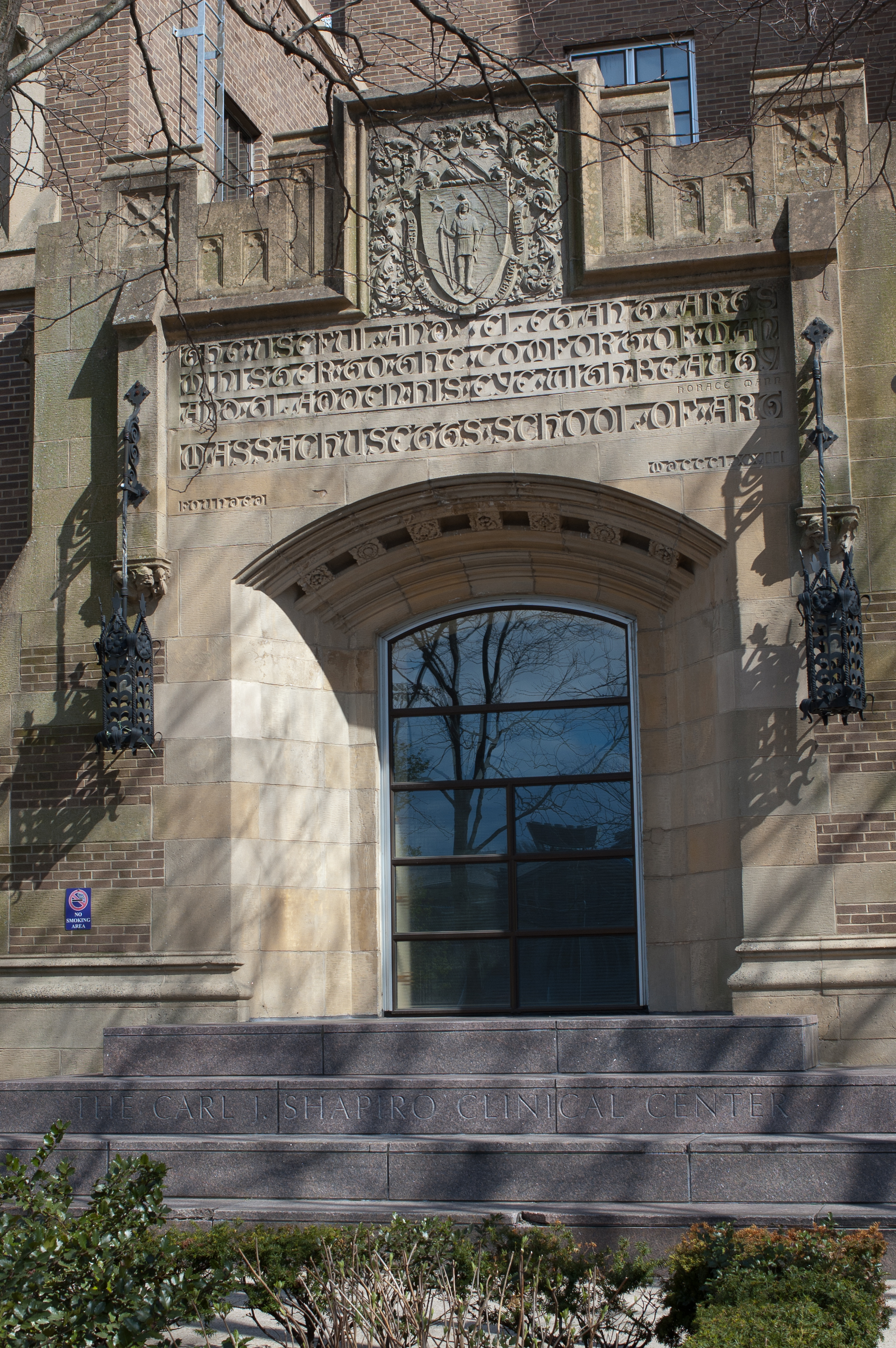

- Location within Massachusetts Location within the United States
- Location: Boston, Massachusetts
- Coordinates: 42°20′20″N 71°6′24″W
- Built: 1929
- Architect: Henry & Richmond
- Architectural style: Late Gothic Revival, Art Deco
- NRHP reference No.: 89000974
- Added to NRHP: August 3, 1989

The Massachusetts School of Art is an historic academic building at 364 Brookline Avenue in the Longwood Medical Area of Boston, Massachusetts. The four-story Gothic/Art Deco building was designed by the architectural firm of Henry & Richmond, and was built in 1929-30 for the Massachusetts College of Art. The school occupied the building until 1983, when it moved to its present campus on Huntington Avenue. The building is now part of the Beth Israel Deaconess Medical Center.

The building was listed on the National Register of Historic Places in 1989 and is currently under study for landmark status by the Boston Landmarks Commission.

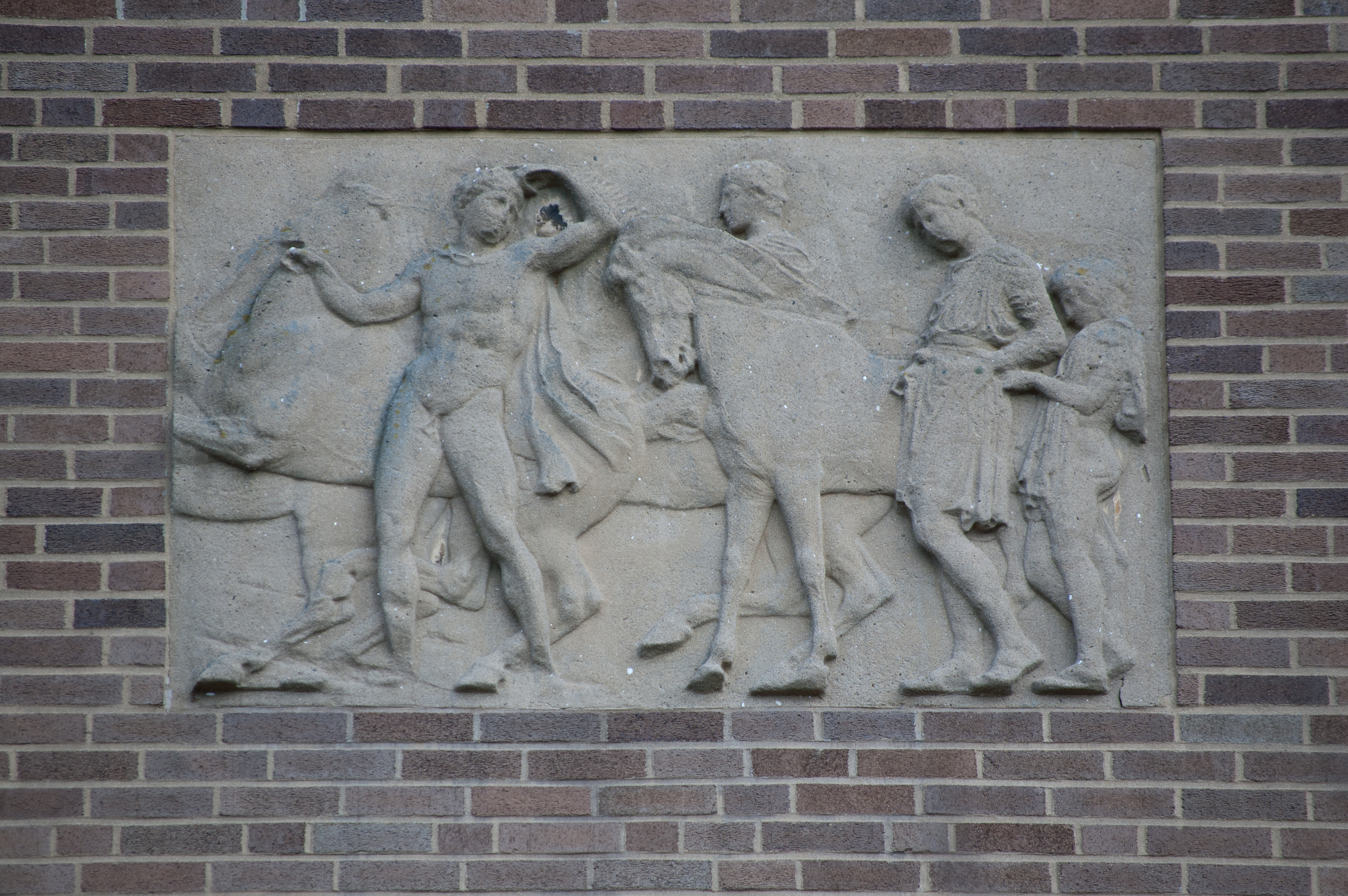
Massachusetts School of Art facade detail

== See also ==
- National Register of Historic Places listings in southern Boston, Massachusetts
