= Henry Theodore Hallman =

American painter (1904–1999)

Henry Theodore Hallman (1904–1999) was a 20th-century painter/illustrator from Montgomery County, Pennsylvania who painted many local scenes.

== Life ==
Hallman was born in Milford Square, Bucks County, Pennsylvania in 1904. His family relocated to Souderton in 1920 while Hallman was 16, and two years later he graduated from Souderton High School. He earned his first college degree, a bachelor's in fine arts, from the University of Arts in Philadelphia under famed illustrator N. C. Wyeth. Following his graduation, he took a 3-month bicycle tour through Italy and France to further his study of painting.

Early in his career, Hallman illustrated many stories for the Curtis Publishing Company He loved to teach, and earned a second bachelor's degree in education from Temple University before landing a professorship at West Chester University (WCU). He later pursued a master's degree in fine arts and led his department at WCU.

Hallman married Mildred Brumbaugh, and together they had two children: a son, Henry Theodore Jr., and a daughter, Eleanor Antoinette (Clyde). Hallman also had a sister and several grandchildren.

Hallman retired to the Dock Meadows retirement community on Rte 309 in Hilltown, PA in 1993, spending his final 3 years in their Dock Terrace section before his death in 1999 at age 95.

== Works ==
Some of Hallman's known local scenes include the Franconia Mennonite Meetinghouse, Godshall's Mill, and the Rising Sun Bridge.
