= Shawn Theodore =

American photographer (born 1970)

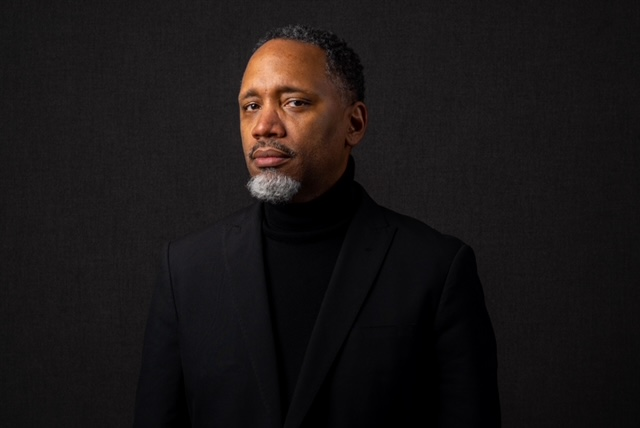
- Theodore in 2022
- Born: Shawn Theodore; Germany
- Website: www.shawntheodo.re

Shawn Theodore (born 1970) is a Philadelphia contemporary artist, writer and photographer. Theodore, who was born in Germany and raised in the West Oak Lane section of the city, focuses on a variety of photographic genres within the context of Blackness. His work is an intersection of visual and written narratives, illusory perspectives, and culturally significant photographic imagery, and objects to speak to the importance and equivalence of historical and quotidian moments of African-American culture.

Theodore first came into prominence for his color-saturated, silhouette-focused street photography work. "I was drawn to the notion of what happens to the self as the objects, spaces, and places around you begin to disappear. In other words, what happens to the Black body and mind in vanishing Black neighborhoods?" The first solo exhibition of his street photography was of his first photography project, ‘The Avenues’ in 2015, at the Painted Bride Art Center in Philadelphia, as a part of Re-PLACE-ing Philadelphia which was supported by The Pew Center for Arts & Heritage.

His stated goal is the exploration of race, spirituality, patriarchy, matriarchy, and class structure within Black communities. He describes this further, stating that "My work challenges how identity is created by story, folklore, legend, and ongoing community conversation. I’m driven by the perseverance of hyperlocal storytelling and how it can be its own mythology, in this case, 'Afromythology.'"

In 2016, Theodore photographed a cover for Smithsonian Magazine a special edition issue titled, "Black In America". This issue was a four-part magazine cover project, the other covers were created by the artists Amy Sherald, Lorna Simpson, and Delphine Diallo. In 2019, Theodore was published in the New York Times for an article titled, "What Reparations for Slavery Might Look Like in 2019," which also included his original collage artwork. In 2019, Theodore photographed the cover image for Paper Magazine featuring American civil rights activist and football quarterback Colin Kaepernick. The issue featured photographed portraits of Kaepernick and several other prominent African American activists and entertainers such as Dr. Angela Davis, Tarana Burke, Taraji P. Henson, Yara Shahidi, The Exonerated 5, Indya Moore, Ava DuVernay, and Bryan Stevenson.

In 2020, a photo illustration by Theodore appeared in the February 2020 issue of The Atlantic, alongside the article, The Fight to Decolonize the Museum. In the February 2020 issue of The New Republic, a photo illustration by Theodore appeared with an article titled, Bookerism and the Black Elite, Managing race relations from above. In April 2020, The New Republic published a photo illustration by Theodore of prominent civil rights organizer Stokley Carmichael. The image accompanied the article, From Black Power to Black Establishment—The curious legacy of a radical slogan. In 2021, Theodore gained national attention for publishing a 2018 portrait of the poet Amanda Gorman, after her reading of the poem "The Hill We Climb" at the inauguration of Joe Biden. In 2024, The National Portrait Gallery acquired this work, entitled "Mnêmosynê, Afrolinquistica - a portrait of Poet Laureate Amanda S. Gorman, 2018".

In 2025, Theodore co-curated 'Shawn Theodore's Pyramid Club: 1937-2035', an exhibition and research project presented by Temple Contemporary on the campus of Temple University, examining the history and cultural legacy of Philadelphia's Pyramid Club, Philadelphia's leading African American social club of its time. Theodore additionally served as a researcher, exhibition designer and the lead, featured artist for the project. Theodore's work was presented in a dedicated installation within one of the three-room gallery presentation alongside paintings associated with the historic Pyramid Club and photographs by prominent Philadelphia photographer, John W. Mosley.

In 2026, Theodore curated 'Before Another Name: A Photographic Archive of Black North Philadelphia, 2010-2020' at The Charles Library at Temple University presented by the Charles L. Blockson Afro-American Collection. Theodore served as the curator, exhibition designer and lead designer for the project, which assembled works from pasts projects, such as Home Court (2018), A Dream Deferred. Redlining: Past, Present, Future (2018), Diamonds in the Rough (2020), and works from his street photography practice. The exhibition examined neighborhood continuity, institutional expansion, and redevelopment surrounding Temple University, and coincided with Theodore's donation of the archive to the Blockson Collection, which he described as returning "the record to the community it came from".

Theodore's photography works have been exhibited at NXTHVN, Future Fair - NYC (2025), New Art Dealers Alliance - Miami (2024), the African American Museum in Philadelphia, Mennello Museum of American Art, The Barnes Foundation, Steven Kasher Gallery, The Association of International Photography Art Dealers, The Bakalar & Paine Gallery at Massachusetts College of Art and Design, Snap! Orlando, PRIZM Art Fair, Philadelphia Photo Arts Center, and the University of the Arts among others.
