= Carbone Smolan Agency =

American branding agency

- Type: Private
- Industry: Marketing and Advertising
- Predecessor: Gottschalk & Ash International
- Founded: 1976
- Founder: Ken Carbone and Leslie Smolan
- Defunct: 2019
- Headquarters: New York City, United States
- Website: carbonesmolan.com

Carbone Smolan Agency was an independent branding agency that operated in New York City in 1976 – 2019. Its proprietors Kenneth Carbone and Leslie Smolan were awarded the 2014 AIGA Gold medal for their achievements in corporate identity design, publishing, and strategy.

== History ==
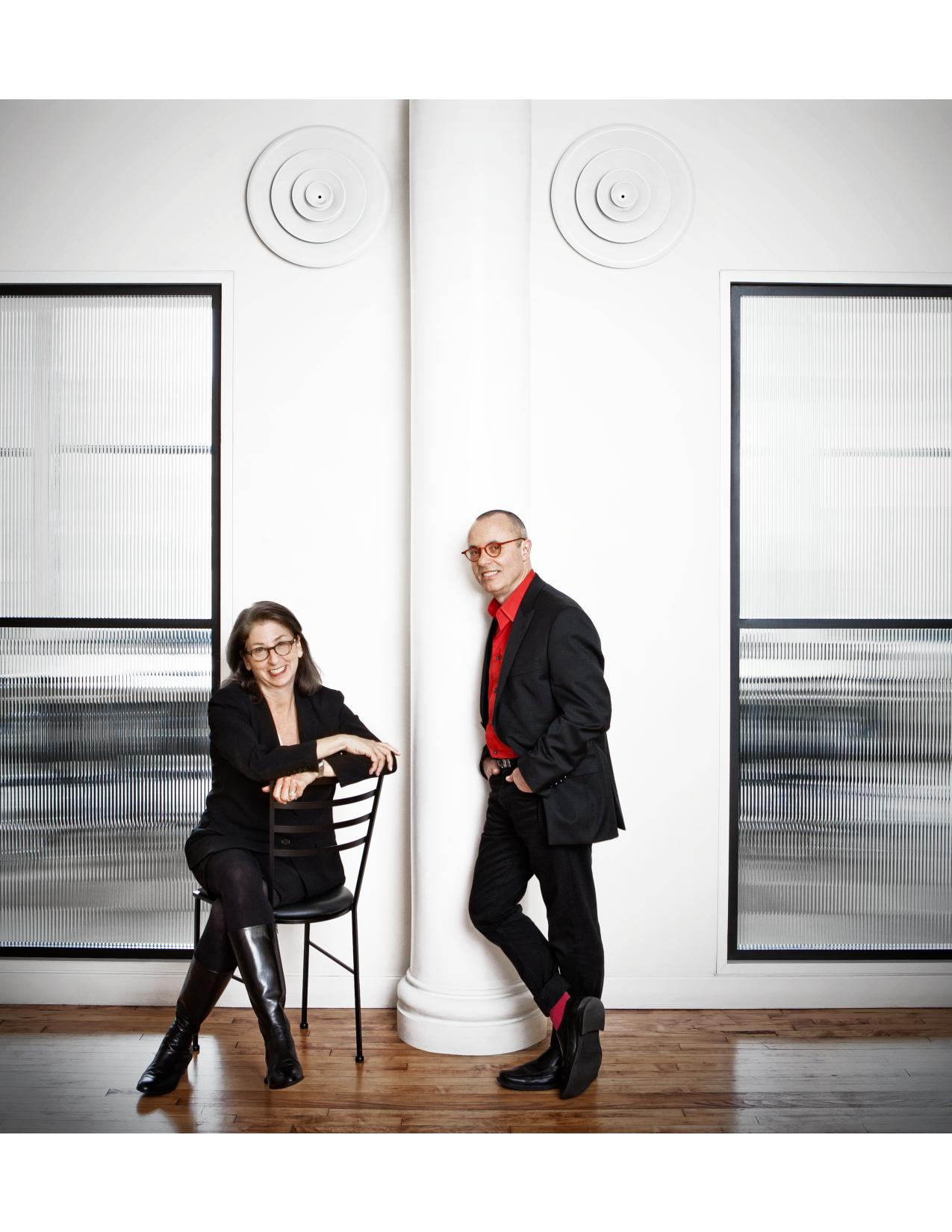
Leslie Smolan and Ken Carbone

In 1976 Ken Carbone opened the New York office of the Canadian graphic design firm Gottschalk+Ash International. In 1977 he met and hired Leslie Smolan. Theirs was an expanded view of "graphic design" beyond its two-dimensional applications and embraced the range interdisciplinary communication practices including customer experience design, architectural graphics, branded environments, and packaging design.

In 1980 Carbone and Smolan bought out their Canadian partners through a leveraged buyout, and renamed the company Carbone Smolan Agency. Carbone was creative director; Smolan was director of creative strategy.

Company served many notable corporate and cultural brands including such organizations as Musée du Louvre, Christie's, Mandarin Oriental Hotel Group, Morgan Stanley, Boston Consulting Group, Tapestry Inc., Dale Carnegie, Credit Suisse, High Museum of Art, Museum of Modern Art and Chicago Symphony Orchestra, AIGA, Jewish Museum, Natural History Museum of Los Angeles County, and Brooklyn Botanic Garden. CSA had 20 exhibits in the AIGA permanent archives.

== Louvre signage program ==
In December 1985 Carbone Smolan Agency presented its credentials for the “Signalétique du Grand Louvre,” the visitor information and signage program to complement the Louvre's visitors' entrance and underground plaza being designed by I.M. Pei, creator of the Louvre Pyramid. The French government awarded the New York-based Carbone Smolan Agency the signage project October 3, 1986. Introduced to the public in 1989, Carbone Smolan's visitor information and signage program was predicated on the Arrondissements of Paris plan and remained in place as of 2019.

In their report on the selection of Ken Carbone and Leslie Smolan as AIGA Medalists in 2014, AIGA journalist Angela Riechers noted, “In 1985 they won the commission—an honor for a relatively young studio. The project’s success and high visibility helped establish CSA as a studio of major importance in the larger design landscape.” It was featured in "Graphic Design Since 1950" by Alliance Graphique Internationale and Communication Arts magazine, and was recipient of the Communication Arts 1990 Award of Excellence.

== Awards and recognition ==
- 2014 American Institute of Graphic Artists (AIGA) Medal, Ken Carbone and Leslie Smolan
- 2012 GDUSA's American Web Design Award, website design for Niles Bolton Associates
- 2010 Chicago Poster Biennial, finalist: Diego Rivera poster by Ken Carbone
- 2008 SEGD Design Awards Merit Award, environmental graphics for W. L. Gore Capabilities Center
- 2008 AIGA 365
- 2005 ReBrand 100 Awards: Best of Show, rebranding for Assurant
