= John Rais =

American blacksmith (born circa 1973)

John Rais (born c. 1973) is an American designer, blacksmith and sculptor, known for his decorative architectural work, vessels, and furniture. Rais primarily works in steel as well as titanium, bronze, copper, stainless steel, and other materials. He is well known for his one-of-a-kind firescreens. He has resided in Layton, New Jersey; and Philadelphia, Pennsylvania.

== Early life and education ==
Rais was born c. 1973, in Burlington, Massachusetts, U.S. He was the youngest of seven children. Rais was introduced to blacksmithing in a sculpture class at the age of 18.

He went to college at the Massachusetts College of Art, graduating in 1995, BFA degree in sculpture. After working at an architectural ironworks and a living history museum in Massachusetts, he decided to go to graduate school. Rais received his masters of fine arts degree from Cranbrook Academy of Art in 1998, after which he worked at Peters Valley Craft Center as a department head.

== Career ==
Rais was a department head of blacksmithing at Peters Valley Craft Center from 1998 to 2001. He has run his own design and metalsmithing studio since 1998.

While at Cranbrook, Rais was approached by two collectors to make three fire screens for their large Arts and Crafts style home in Bloomfield, Michigan. This commission was the springboard to him opening a business. Rais opened his studio after graduate school in 1998. He did so with about $850.00 and a fire screen commission. In the early years of the studio, several collectors and gallery shows sustained the studio, including the designer, ceramic artist, mentor and friend, Bennett Bean. In 2001, Rais began to try doing craft shows as a way to reach a wider audience and gain the attention of galleries. His first national show was the Philadelphia Museum of Art Craft Show. He went on to repeatedly exhibit at the Philadelphia Museum Show, Smithsonian Craft Show, Washington Craft Show, and Craft Boston. He gained many gallery relationships through these shows. He had shown with and or represented by Thirteen Moons Gallery (later known as Jane Sauer Gallery), Del Mano Gallery, Gallery 500, Mobilia Gallery, and Snyderman-Works Gallery including several others.

His commissioned architectural work has always been one of a kind. It is collected nationally and is often featured in books and magazines. In 2009 he began working on a Museum acquisition for Yale University Art Galleries. The project is a series of 90 decorative panels that span the railing of the main staircase. The project takes many design cues from the building's Gothic Revival style and is influenced in part by some of the architectural ironwork in the museum by Samuel Yellin. The work is now part of the museum's permanent collection. Rais was one of only three artists commissioned by Yale Art Galleries as part of the museum's massive renovation/expansion completed in 2012.

In early August 2013, John moved his studio to Philadelphia, Pennsylvania in order to focus on expanding his business. In September 2013, John was asked to design and create the decorative metal work for the famous Addison Mizner house, Villa des Cygnes, in Palm Beach, Florida. The scope of this project includes seven balcony rails, entrance gates, grills, lighting and doors, which will be executed through his studio as well as several other highly skilled metal studios from Philadelphia and Maryland. The main project was successfully completed in February 2015, with some additional pieces that will be installed throughout the year.

== Teaching ==
- Adjunct professor, Moore College of Art and Design, Philadelphia, Pennsylvania; spring 2014 to current
- Fall 8-week concentration, "The Skin, Bones and Soul of Iron", 2012
- Session 2 instructor in iron, "Intersections", Penland School of Craft, Penland, North Carolina (summer 2010)
- Adjunct instructor, Purchase College, State University of New York, Purchase, (fall 2007)
- Senior lecturer, University of the Arts, Philadelphia, Pennsylvania (fall 2004 - spring 2006)
- Adjunct professor, State University of New York at New Paltz (2005)
- Adjunct instructor, County College of Sussex (2003)
- Departmental head of blacksmithing, Peters Valley Craft Center (1997–2001)
- Honorary doctorate in art history, Yale University (2014)

== Publications include ==
- Artscope Magazine
- Philadelphia Home
- Milford Magazine
- Departures magazine
- Ritz-Carlton magazine
- Metalsmith
- American Craft
- Anvils Ring

== Books/video ==
- Maker Profile John Rais, Contemporary Makers series DVD Graham Eccles, Odyssey DVD Great Britain, approximately 48 minutes
- Architectural Ironwork by Dona Z. Meilach, 2001 Schiffer Publishing, page 28
- Fireplace Accessories by Dona Z. Meilach, 2002, Schiffer Publishing, pp. 42, 69, 219, 242
- Art of the Tea Pot by Dona Meilach, Schiffer Publishing
- 500 Metal Vessels, Lark Books, Sterling Publishing, pp. 25, 318
- 500 Enameled Objects, Lark Books, Sterling Publishing, p. 179
- Art Metal, by Matthew Clarke, Schiffer Publishing, 2008
- Memphis Impressions, Bob Schatz, Farcountry Press, p. 13

== Awards ==
- Residency, Windgate Foundation, in Applied Design, SUNY Purchase 2007
- Residency, John Michael Kohler Art Center, Kohler, Wisconsin (2006)
- Artists Choice Award, Smithsonian Craft Show, Washington, D.C. (2004)
- Best Metals Design, Philadelphia Furniture and Furnishings Show, Philadelphia, Pennsylvania (2002)
- Residency at Peters Valley Craft Center, Layton, New Jersey (1998)
- Finalist, Niche Magazine Awards, Metal
