= David Dewey =

American painter

David Dewey (born 1946 in Phillipsburg, NJ) is an American landscape painter, known for his watercolor works. In 1968 he received his BFA from Philadelphia College of Art, and in 1974, his MFA from Washington State University. He is represented by Bernaducci Meisel Gallery, in New York City, NY. His work is very focused on light properties.

Dewey is the author of The Watercolor Book, published by Watson-Guptil in 1995. He currently teaches at Lyme Academy College of Fine Art and New York Academy of Art.

== Exhibitions ==
Dewey's work is included in the collection of the Farnsworth Art Museum and the Frye Art Museum in Seattle, Washington. Among other places, his work has also been shown at:

- Corcoran Gallery of Art, Washington DC
- Roberts Wesleyan College, Rochester NY
- Lehigh University, Bethlehem, PA
- Messiah College, Grantham, PA
- University of Wisconsin, Oshkosh, WI
- Swain Galleries, Plainfield, NJ
- Rouse & Co. (On Permanent View: Commissioned Suite of Paintings)
- The St Paul Companies, St. Paul, MN
- The Arkansas Arts Center, AR
- West Publishing Co. St. Paul, MN
- Gordon College, Wendam, MA
- Everhart Museum, Scranton PA
- Lebanon Valley College, Annville, PA
- Rider University, Lawrenceville, NJ
- Center for Maine Contemporary Art, Rockport, ME
- Fischbach Gallery, NYC
- Newport Museum of Art, Newport, RI
