= Louise D. Clement-Hoff =

American artist and educator (1926–2020)

Louise D. Clement-Hoff (June 4, 1926 – Jan 31, 2020) was an American painter and educator who specialized in oil painting, pastel and drawing of human figures and still lifes. Her work was included in the 2015-16 exhibition "We Speak: Black Artists in Philadelphia, 1920s-1970s" held at the Woodmere Art Museum in Philadelphia.

== Early life and education ==
Louise Darling Clement-Hoff was born to John George and Eva Adele Ulett in Philadelphia and attended William Penn High School. She received her Bachelor of Fine Arts degree from the Philadelphia College of Art (now known as the University of the Arts) and continued her art studies at the Tyler School of Art of Temple University, the Pennsylvania Academy of Fine Arts, and the Barnes Foundation.

== Career ==
Clement-Hoff's teaching career included 18 years of figure drawing classes at Woodmere Art Museum, figure drawing, still life composition and painting at the private art college, Hussian School of Art; and more than 64 years of painting, sculpture and drawing at the Fleisher Art Memorial, all in Philadelphia. She also taught oil painting to the parents of students enrolled in Fleisher's Saturday Young Artists Program and at West Chester University in Chester County, Pennsylvania.

Clement-Hoff was a painter and draftsperson. Several museums and galleries exhibited her paintings throughout the Philadelphia metropolitan area during her lifetime, and her work is in art collections in New York City, Philadelphia, Washington, D.C., and San Francisco. In 1998, West Chester University's McKinney Gallery presented her retrospective exhibition. The Atlantic City Art Center hosted an exhibit of her works in oil painting, pastel, and drawing in 2000.

In 1988, her work was represented in an exhibit of prints at the Philadelphia Free Library titled The Pride, the Prejudice, which examined the portrayal of Blacks in various media over the last 300 years. The show also included works by Howard N. Watson, Dox Thrash, Samuel J. Brown Jr., Varnette Honeywood, Cal Massey and Barbara Bullock.

== Posthumous recognition ==
Clement-Hoff work also featured in Daphne Landis's 2003 book Speaking for Themselves: The Artists of Southeastern Pennsylvania which described it as reflecting an interest in what is "rampantly alive".

At a ceremony led by Philadelphia mayor Michael Nutter, the Fleisher Art Memorial selected Clement-Hoff to receive the 2015 Founder's Award in recognition of her lasting impact on the school.

Clement-Hoff's work was included in the 2015 exhibition We Speak: Black Artists in Philadelphia, 1920s-1970s at the Woodmere Art Museum.
