= Movement at the Still Point: An Ode to Dance =

2023 photography book by Mark Mann

- Author: Mark Mann
- Language: English
- Publisher: Rizzoli
- Publication date: March 21, 2023
- Pages: 240
- ISBN: 978-0-8478-9911-1

Movement at the Still Point: An Ode to Dance is a photography book by portrait photographer Mark Mann, published by Rizzoli in 2023. The book presents black-and-white photographs of dance artists in both posed portraiture and movement imagery and includes a foreword by Chita Rivera.

== Background ==
The project originated during the COVID-19 pandemic when it was suggested that Mann photograph dancers who were experiencing the effects of isolation and the loss of performance opportunities; Mann then began photographing dancers starting in 2021. The work developed into a monograph combining action images with close-up portraits using a 120mm lens.

Mann collaborated with dancers and choreographer's from various institutions, including Sara Mearns, Carmen de Lavallade, Gus Solomons Jr.

The book's title is a reference to T. S. Eliot Four Quartets.

=== Performance ===
To celebrate the publication of the monograph, a one-night performance was held at The Joyce Theater on April 10, 2023 with dancers from the New York City Ballet, American Ballet Theatre, and the Martha Graham Dance Company.

== Reception ==
Dance Informa Magazine wrote that the black and white photographs include dancers across multiple forms including ballet, Broadway, hip hop, ballroom, flamenco, vogue, and tap. The Brooklyn Rail discussed the difficulty of conveying dance in still photography and wrote that the book presents dancers both in motion and in portrait photographs. American dancer Wendy Perron praised the photographs’ as "timeless", with the book covering 142 dance artists with both a portrait and a full-body image, also noting the inclusion of dancers across a wide range of ages. Rangefinder characterized the book as a pandemic-era project that mixes motion imagery with close-up portraits.

== See also ==
- Ross McDonnell – Irish film director who made a monochrome photo book, and a COVID-19 documentary
