= Leif Skoogfors =

American documentary photographer

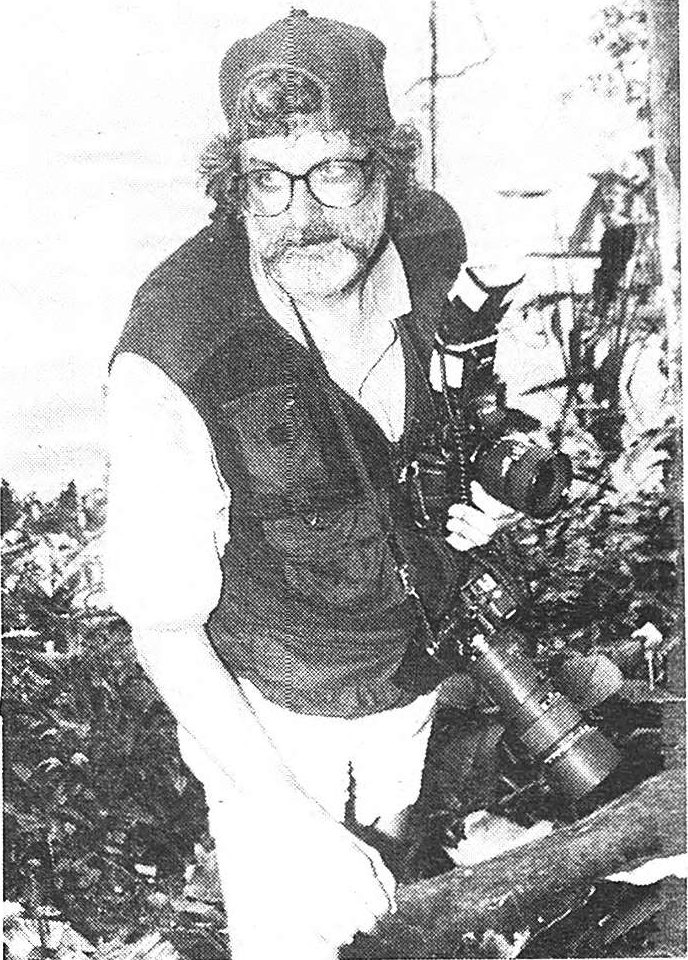
Photographer Leif Skoogfors ventured into the jungles of Panama to get shots of the Navy here for News week magazine.

Leif Skoogfors (born 1940 in Wilmington, Delaware) is an American documentary photographer and educator. He was born one month after his family, including his brothers Olaf and Eric, fled Sweden as World War II broke out. His family crossed the North Atlantic in December 1939 on a neutral Norwegian ship.

They returned to Sweden in 1946, where Skoogfors attended primary school in a small town in Dalarna County. When the Russian blockade of Berlin raised war fears, the family returned to the U.S. and settled near Philadelphia.

His brother, Olaf Skoogfors, was a silversmith and jeweler who influenced Leif's interest in art and photography. Skoogfors joined the U.S. Army and served for three years with the Alaska Communications System.

In 1961, he studied under the renowned art director Alexey Brodovitch at the Design Laboratory in New York.

He began a freelance photography career in 1962, documenting the Civil Rights and anti-war movements and social issues.

He began teaching photography at Temple University's Tyler School of Art in 1964 while continuing his photography career. In 1966, he founded the BFA photography program at Moore College of Art in Philadelphia, where he continued teaching as a tenured professor until 1983.

His book on the war in Northern Ireland, "The Most Natural Thing in the World," was published by Harper & Row in New York and London in 1974. Photographs from the book have been exhibited widely. Rudolf Arnheim commented, "The photographs… combine documentary impact with a pictorial originality and beauty that is always strictly at the service of the subject, its meaning and mood."

He has worked extensively for both Time Magazine and Newsweek Magazines in numerous conflict zones. His work has also appeared in The New York Times, The Washington Post, Paris Match, National Geographic and publications in more than forty countries.

His work is in the permanent collections of The Philadelphia Museum of Art, The George Eastman House, The Whitney Museum of American Art, and Princeton University.

He has actively been involved in copyright protection for photographers and was a plaintiff in an action against Google. He has also assisted journalists facing potential issues with post-traumatic stress injuries.

In 2008, Skoogfors suffered a traumatic brain injury while covering tornado damage in Atlanta.
