= Ned Beard =

American cartoonist

Ned Fulton Beard (1925 - 2004) was a graphic artist and cartoonist. While working his way up to the position of Art Director for the Engineering Department at DuPont in Delaware, he drew cartoons and caricatures that featured in local newspapers. From 1961 to 1984 he drew a comic strip for internal publication at DuPont. The strip, which often featured his everyman character, "Y.I.Y. Skeever", a draftsman, proved popular and was eventually published in book form. The strip reflected the changes in the workplace over the years, particularly the change from a male-dominated environment to one in which women made their mark and automation began taking over many parts of the work.

Beard was born in Texas, but spent most of his life in Pennsylvania and Delaware. He was educated at the Philadelphia Museum School of Industrial Art (now the University of the Arts (Philadelphia))

Originals and copies of Beard's work are now held at Ohio State University.
