= Alina Wheeler =

American brand consultant and author

Alina Radziejowski Wheeler (1948 – 2023) was an American graphic designer and author. She was the co-founder of a graphic design firm and co-author of the books Designing Brand Identity (2003) and Brand Atlas: Branding Intelligence Made Visible (2011).

== Early life and education ==
Wheeler was born on October 14, 1948, in Essex County, New Jersey, the daughter of Stanislaw and Leonarda (née Dobek) Radziejowska. She attended Sacred Heart of Jesus primary school, Columbia High School and later the Philadelphia College of Arts, graduating in 1970. She later married Ed Wheeler.

== Career ==
Wheeler ran her own design firm before co-founding the Philadelphia graphic design firm Katz Wheeler in 1979-1980 with designer Joel Katz. She was the president of the American Institute of Graphic Arts (AIGA)'s Philadelphia chapter in 1985 and served on the board of the national organisation from 1991 to 1994.

In 1993, Katz Wheeler was disestablished and Wheeler began working as a brand consultant. In 1999, Wheeler was working as the president of the design firm RevGroup. The same year, she was made a fellow of the AIGA.

In 2003, she released the book Designing Brand Identity: A Comprehensive Guide to the World of Brands and Branding.

In 2011, she co-authored the book Brand Atlas: Branding Intelligence Made Visible.

== Critical reception ==
Of Wheeler's Designing Brand Identity (2003), Russell Casey writing in the Journal of the Academy of Marketing Science called the book "a timely resource" and said "For the busy person, this book provides a framework for creating brand identity, from logo design, naming the brand, color schemes, creating brochures, including a designer's perspective with helpful advice from industry gurus, and how to handle the brand changes that come about as a result of mergers. This book would be useful to undergraduate/graduate students and anyone trying to create a brand."

Graham Medcalf, writing in The NZ Marketing Magazine explained that the "book starts out by defining the difference between brand and brand identity, and lays out a set of fundamental concepts that form the basis of a successful brand identity process. In the second, and most interesting, part of the book, Wheeler sets out the brand identity process. She avoids... waffle... and brings a coherent approach based on vision, meaning, authenticity, differentiation and sustainability."

D K Holland writing in Communication Arts said "Three factors make this book most engaging....: it's a very scanable book... easy to use [and] thoroughly visual.... Wheeler has succeeded in publishing a compendium that will prove to be a valued reference book for all members of the branding team".

== Awards and honours ==
In 2012, Wheeler was awarded a Silver Star for outstanding alumni by the University of the Arts.

== Death and legacy ==
Wheeler died in Philadelphia on December 5, 2023. She was 75.

In 2024, AIGA Philadelphia named its undergraduate design scholarship the Alina Wheeler Memorial Scholarship in her honor.

== Works ==
- Wheeler, Alina and Rob Meyerson. (2024). Designing Brand Identity: A Comprehensive Guide to the World of Brands and Branding (6th ed.). Wiley. ISBN 978-1-119-98481-8.
- Wheeler, Alina and Joel Katz. (2011) Brand Atlas: Branding Intelligence Made Visible.
- Designing Brand Identity (2003).
