= Dana P. Vaughan =

American academic (1899–1983)

- Born: Dana Prescott Vaughan; June 20, 1899; Middleboro, Massachusetts, US
- Died: March 21, 1983 (aged 83); Clearwater, Florida, US
- Occupation: Academic administrator

Academic background
- Education: Massachusetts Normal Art School; Philadelphia Museum School of Art; University of Upsala

Academic work
- Discipline: Architecture
- Institutions: Rhode Island School of Design; Trenton School of Industrial Arts; Cooper Union

Dana Prescott Vaughan (June 20, 1899 – March 21, 1983) was an American educator and academic administrator. He was the dean of art and architecture Cooper Union, the dean of Rhode Island School of Design, and director of the Trenton School of Industrial Arts.

== Early life ==
Vaughan was born on June 20, 1899 in Middleboro, Massachusetts. His parents were Laura G. (née Stickney) and Albert H. Vaughan.

He attended the Massachusetts Normal Art School. He then served in the United States Army during World War I.

Around 1920, he enrolled in the Philadelphia Museum School of Art and graduated in 1924. Vaughan continued his education, taking courses at Harvard University, Brown University, and the Beaux-Arts Institute of Design. He studied social sciences and Sweden's arts and crafts at the University of Upsala in 1937.

== Career ==
Vaughan was an art instructor at the Chestnut Hill Academy for five years, starting in 1919. He was then an art instructor and the assistant principal at the Shady Hill Country Day School in Philadelphia, Pennsylvania from 1925 to 1927. At the same time, he taught color and design at the Evening School of the Philadelphia Museum School of Art.

In 1927, Vaughan started teaching color and design at the Rhode Island School of Design. He became the head of its junior school in 1928. From 1932 to 1942, he was dean of Rhode Island School of Design. Vaughan was the director of the Trenton School of Industrial Arts from 1942 to 1945. He also taught at the University of Pennsylvania. Vaughan lectured widely in the Eastern United States on art in everyday life and was considered an expert on Japanese and Swedish art.

He was then dean of the School of Art and Architecture at Cooper Union for the Advancement of Science and Art. While there, he established the Bachelor of Arts in architecture program. He retired from Cooper Union as dean emeritus in 1963.

Vaughan was the president of the Eastern Arts Association from 1946 to 1946. He was secretary of the Rhode Island chapter of the American Artists Professional League in 1935. In 1948, he was the founding treasurer of the National Association of Schools of Design, representing Cooper Union. He was also a member of the Providence Art Club and the Progressive Education Association.

== Honors ==
Vaughan received an honorary Doctor of Fine Arts from the Moore Institute in 1957. In 2009, Vaughn received the Silver Star Alumni Award and was included in an exhibition of the same name by the University of the Arts, previously known as Philadelphia Museum School of Art.

== Personal life ==
Vaughan married Muriel Louise True in 1924. She was a graduate of the Massachusetts School of Art and was the art supervisor at the Salem College of Education. They had two sons: Dana P. Vaughan Jr. and Alden T. Vaughan His wife died in November 1948.

Vaughan was a trustee of the New York School for the Deaf and a board member of the Federal Hill House and the Institute for Trend Research. He was a member of Rotary International, and the Brown University War Information Committee.

In the 1940s, Vaughan restored a Revolutionary War era home in Concord, New Hampshire. In 1982, he purchased and renovated a cabin in Orford, New Hampshire, located on the Connecticut River. He also had a home in Clearwater, Florida.

Vaughan died from cancer on March 21, 1983, in Clearwater, Florida.
