= Salvatore Pinto =

American painter

- Born: January 4, 1905; Casal Velino, Italy
- Died: October 5, 1966 (aged 61); Philadelphia, Pennsylvania, United States
- Occupation: Painter

Salvatore Pinto (January 4, 1905 – October 5, 1966) was an American painter. His work was part of the painting event in the art competition at the 1936 Summer Olympics.
