= Cheryl Goldsleger =

American artist and educator (born 1951)

- Born: 1951 (age 74–75); Philadelphia, Pennsylvania
- Education: Washington University in St. Louis
- Known for: Painting
- Website: www.cherylgoldsleger.com

Cheryl Goldsleger (born 1951) is an American artist and educator. She has resided in Athens, Georgia, since 1977.

== Early life and education ==
Goldsleger was born in Philadelphia, Pennsylvania and began her formal education in art in 1969 at the Philadelphia College of Art where she received a full scholarship. In 1971 she attended Temple University's Tyler School of Art in Rome. She earned her degree of Master of Fine Arts from Washington University in St. Louis in 1975.

== Career ==
Cheryl Goldsleger, Stations, 1984

Goldsleger employs isometric drawing, painting, and encaustic to create layered, architectural spaces to explore time, perception, and the process of comprehension. She has exhibited her work in numerous solo and group shows both in the United States and internationally including at the Corcoran Gallery in Washington, D.C., the American Academy in New York, the Albright-Knox Art Gallery in Buffalo, the Brooklyn Museum, the Islip Art Museum, The National Museum of Women in the Arts, the Virginia Museum, the New Orleans Museum, the Israel Museum, and the Tel Aviv Museum. In 2013, she created a series of paintings, drawings, sculpture, and a series of six videos for The National Academy of Sciences in Washington, D.C.

Goldsleger's awards include two National Endowment for the Arts Artist Fellowships, a Southeastern Center for Contemporary Art Fellowship, a residency at the La Napoule Foundation in southern France and a US/France exchange fellowship at the Cite Internationale des Arts in Paris. Her career as an artist and educator includes professorships at Western Carolina University (1975–1977), Georgia Piedmont College (1988–2001), and Georgia State University (2001–2014). At Piedmont College she serves as the chair of the art department. In 2015 Goldsleger was appointed the Morris Eminent Scholar in Art at Georgia Regents University in Augusta.
