= Laurence Miller Gallery =

Photography gallery in New York City

Coordinates: 40°45′0.94″N 74°0′13.33″W

- Type: Art gallery and dealership
- Founded: 1984 (42 years ago)
- Founder: Laurence Miller
- Headquarters: New York City, United States
- Website: www.laurencemillergallery.com

The Laurence Miller Gallery is a former public contemporary art gallery in New York City, established in 1984 and specializing in fine art photography. It has been described as "one of the longest-running American galleries devoted to photography". The gallery became known for its exhibitions of modernist and experimental photography, including works by Helen Levitt, Ray Metzker, and Lee Friedlander. After decades of operating as a public gallery, it closed to the public during the COVID-19 pandemic, and transitioned to private art dealing and consulting, with operations in New York City and New Hope, Pennsylvania.

== History ==
=== Founding and early years ===
The proprietor of the gallery, Laurence Miller, began his gallery career with the Quivira Photography Gallery in New Mexico, where Miller was affiliated with the art department of the University of New Mexico. After serving as associate director of Light Gallery in New York, and a showing of his own photographs at the M.F.A. Gallery of the Rochester Institute of Technology, Miller established himself as a private photography dealer in 1980. In a 2019 interview, Miller described his work at Light Gallery from 1974 to 1980, with responsibilities including organizing traveling exhibitions, until disagreement over the gallery's increasing involvement with commercial and fashion photography led to his departure. Initially operating as a private dealer, Miller began representing Val Telberg, whose photographic montages appealed to him at a time when the reproducibility of photographic prints presented difficulties in establishing their value as collectible art. Miller began representing Ray Metzker around 1982.

Miller opened a gallery in his own name in January 1984 on East 57th Street. The initial gallery occupied approximately 330 square feet of space at 38 East 57th Street. According to Miller, one of its early exhibitions, "The One and Only: Unique Photographs Since the Daguerreotype", was intended to address collectors' concerns about the potentially unlimited reproduction of photographic images. In 1985, the gallery published a portfolio of prints by the late photojournalist Larry Burrows, with the assistance of his son Russell Burrows. In 1986, the gallery moved to a larger space on Spring Street in SoHo, and moved to West 57th Street in 1998. Miller later attributed the departure from SoHo partly to the neighborhood's increasing commercialization.

=== Exhibitions and artistic focus ===
The gallery developed a specialization in modernist and experimental photography, exhibiting both established contemporary photographers and historical photographic works. In 1995, it was reported that the gallery "specializes in showing established contemporary photographers in its main room", with an exhibit at that time titled "Berlin Before the Wall" featuring the work of German photographer Arno Fischer. The gallery was further reported as mounting "exhibitions of vintage prints in its smaller, adjoining space". Among the photographers particularly associated with the gallery were Helen Levitt and Ray Metzker, whose contrasting approaches to street photography reflected the range of its exhibitions. The gallery also exhibited modernist photographers including Aaron Siskind, Minor White, and Val Telberg, as well as experimental work by Robert Heinecken and Michael Spano. In 1999, Miller advocated for giving equal treatment to digital and non-digital photography, stating that "[y]ou wouldn't ask a poet, 'Did you use a keyboard or a pen to write your poem?'" By 2005, it was reported that the gallery "has presented more than two hundred exhibitions that span the history of photography".

In 2014, the gallery celebrated its 30th anniversary "with a show of work by 31 photographers it has represented or shown over the years". The retrospective included examples of the gallery's longstanding interests in modernist, street, and experimental photography, including work by Joan Colom, whose photographs documented street life in Barcelona during the 1950s. The gallery participated in The Armory Show in 2019.

=== Later years and private dealing ===
The gallery eventually relocated from West 57th Street to 521 West 26th Street in Chelsea, Manhattan. Miller stated in 2019 that the relocation had been necessitated by plans to demolish the building housing the previous gallery. He also emphasized the importance of maintaining long-term relationships with the photographers he represented, particularly Metzker. Following the onset of the COVID-19 pandemic, the gallery closed its public exhibition space and transitioned to private art dealing and consulting. It continued to operate by appointment in New York City and New Hope, Pennsylvania. In a 2024 retrospective, Miller described the gallery's continued operation through private sales and online photographic presentations, with Jacob Cartwright serving as gallery director.

== Notable exhibitions ==
- Peter Bialobrzeski, "Neon Tigers" (March 25 – May 15, 2004)
- Barbara Blondeau, "Permutations" (June 3 – July 1, 2010)
- Luca Campigotto, "Gotham and Beyond" (2013)
- Petah Coyne (1997)
- Stephanie Couturier (2007)
- Arno Fischer, "Berlin Before the Wall" (1995)
- Lee Friedlander, "Cherry Blossom Time in Japan" (November 12 – December 13, 1986)

- "Cray at Chippewa Falls" (1988)
- "Like a One-Eyed Cat: Photographs by Lee Friedlander 1956–1987" (1989)
- "A Selection of Nudes" (1991)
- "Work in Progress/Sonora Desert" (1991)

- David Graham, "Where We Live" (2015); other exhibitions (1987, 1989, 1991)
- Philippe Halsman (2010)
- "Betwixt and Between" (2019)
- Les Krims, "Fictions 1969–1974" (2004)
- Helen Levitt, "Body Language" (2023)
- Mark Mann, "Portfolios: Seeing in Series" (2006)
- Ray Metzker (2014)
- Maggie Taylor, "Landscape of Dreams" (September 15 – October 29, 2005)
- Burk Uzzle (2009)
- Bruce Wrighton, "Downtown Men" (2014)
