= Herbert Pullinger =

American illustrator and painter

Herbert Pullinger (1878–1961) was an American illustrator, a painter and printmaker who studied with Henry McCarter and Thomas Anshutz at the Pennsylvania Academy of the Fine Arts. He taught at Philadelphia Museum School of Industrial Art from 1923 to 1958.

== Bibliography ==
- Old Germantown
- Philadelphia, Past and Present (1915)
- Washington: The Nation's Capital (Brentano's, 1921)
- (with T.A. Daly) The Wissahickon (Garden Club of Philadelphia, 1922)
- Richmond Station of the Philadelphia Electric Company System (1926)
- Herbert Pullinger: Watercolors, Etchings, Lithographs and Wood Engravings (Woodmere Art Gallery, 1959)
- Herbert Pullinger: Philadelphia Views (Woodmere Art Gallery, 1983)
