= Albert Gold =

American artist and academic (1916–2006)

- Born: October 31, 1916; Philadelphia, Pennsylvania, US
- Died: February 9, 2006 (aged 89); Philadelphia, Pennsylvania, US
- Education: Philadelphia Museum School of Industrial Art, 1938
- Occupations: Academic and war artist
- Employer(s): Philadelphia Museum School of Industrial Art and United States Army Corps of Engineers

Albert Gold (October 31, 1916 – February 9, 2006) was an American social realism artist, war artist, and academic. He taught at the Philadelphia Museum School of Industrial Art from 1945 to 1982.

== Early life ==
Gold was born on October 31, 1916 in Philadelphia, Pennsylvania. He was raised in North Philadelphia. He attended Northeast High School, graduating in 1934. While in high school, he sketched the streets and waterfront of Philadelphia.

He received a scholarship to the Philadelphia Museum School of Industrial Art, graduating in 1938 with a bachelor's degree in illustration. While he was in college, his works were included in the Pennsylvania Academy of the Fine Arts' annual watercolor and oil exhibitions.

== Career ==
After college, Gold became a freelance artist. He was known for his depiction of the daily lives of ordinary Americans. He often showed the impact of the Great Depression, featuring unemployed men and tenement life. He also depicted circus scenes, city parks, the Italian Market, the Philadelphia Zoo, and Reading Terminal Market in Philadelphia. He supplemented his income by exhibiting at the Pennsylvania Academy of the Fine Arts and other major national shows.

Market Wonders, a lithograph by Gold, was displayed at the 1939 New York World's Fair. In 1941, his paintings were exhibited at the Art Institute of Chicago, the Carnegie Museum of Art, and Corcoran Gallery of Art. In 1942, he was included in the Artists for Victory, Inc. exhibit at the Metropolitan Museum of Art. Also in 1942, he received the Order of the British Empire. On May 26, 1942, he received the Prix de Rome from the American Academy in Rome for his painting of three African American circus cooks. The Prix de Rome came with $1,000 and a yearlong scholarship to the American Academy; however, the latter was disrupted by World War II.

On May 20, 1942, Gold was drafted into the United States Army Corps of Engineers. He was one of twelve artists selected by the Corps to create a pictorial record of the war and was one of three official war artists assigned to the European theater. He sketched and painted every day, creating hundreds of watercolor paintings and drawings of England, France, and Germany that were displayed at The Pentagon, the Smithsonian Institution, museums in London and Paris, and by Eleanor Roosevelt during the war. His war illustrations were also published in Yank, the Army Weekly and the book World War II (1975) by James Jones.

Gold returned to Philadelphia from the war in 1945. Tiffany Foundation gave Gold grants in 1946 and 1947 that allowed him to develop his war drawings into a group of large oil paintings.

Gold taught at the Philadelphia Museum School of Industrial Art, later called the Philadelphia College of the Performing Arts, for 37 years, from 1945 to 1982. He retired as a professor emeritus and the head of the illustration department. He also taught at the Samuel S. Fleisher Art Memorial in Philadelphia and the Pyle Studio in Delaware.

Gold continued to work as an artist and illustrator throughout his life. During the 1950s and 1960s, his series of paintings of the Amish, locker rooms of the Philadelphia Eagles and Philadelphia Phillies, the Mummers Parade, and ordinary people were published in the Philadelphia Bulletin Sunday Magazine.

In 1996, the Philadelphia Art Alliance hosted "Looking at Life", a retrospective that included 69 of his works, including oil paintings, ink drawings, lithographs, and watercolors. In 2009, he was included in the Silver Star Alumni Award Exhibition at the University of the Arts. His also had exhibits at the Musée Galliera and Woodmere Art Museum. His works are in the permanent collections of the Library of Congress, the Metropolitan Museum of Art, the Musee Galliera, the National Gallery in London, The Pentagon, and the Philadelphia Museum of Art.

== Awards ==
- Decorated Order of the British Empire, 1942
- Prix de Rome, 1942
- Silver Star Alumni Award, University of the Arts

== Personal life ==
In 1953, Gold married artist Aurora Vannelli, whom he met at the Philadelphia Museum School of Industrial Art. They had two children, Robert and Madelaine, and lived in Mount Airy, Philadelphia.

Gold died at the Chestnut Hill Hospital in Philadelphia on February 9, 2006. He was buried in Roosevelt Memorial Park.

== Bibliography ==
- Sims, Gayle Ronan (February 10, 2006). "Albert Gold; Painted Regular People". The Philadelphia Inquirer, p. B9.
- Silver Star Alumni Award Exhibition. Philadelphia: University of the Arts College of Art and Design, 2009, pp. 66–67.
- Jones, James (1975). World War II.
- "Albert Gold (1916–2006)". D. Wigmore Fine Art, Inc.
- "Gold, Albert (1916–2006)". Woodmere Art Museum.
- "Albert Gold". Cavalier Galleries.
- Soldiers Serving the Nation: The United States Army and the Artists of World War II. U.S. Army Center of Military History.
