= James Paul Kocsis =

American painter (1936–2021)

- Born: April 27, 1936; Buffalo, New York, U.S.
- Died: December 28, 2021 (aged 85); Allentown, Pennsylvania, U.S.
- Resting place: Nisky Hill Cemetery, Bethlehem, Pennsylvania, U.S.
- Education: Philadelphia College of Art University of the Arts
- Known for: Painting
- Style: Psychic Impressionism
- Spouse: Carol Virginia Frearson
- Website: www.jamespaulkocsis.com

James Paul Kocsis (April 27, 1936 – December 28, 2021) was an independent American painter and book illustrator best known for his vibrant, expressive oil portraits. He called his painting style “psychic impressionism” and said the paintings sprang from his subconscious during studio sessions with the subjects. Kocsis disparaged what he saw as the destructive impact of commercial galleries and dealers on art. Throughout his life, he arranged all his own shows and sales.

== Early life and education ==
Kocsis was born in Buffalo, New York, on April 27, 1936, and moved to Bethlehem, Pennsylvania with his parents at age 6. He began painting at age 12. Kocsis received a four-year scholarship from the Philadelphia College of Art (now University of the Arts), where he studied under painter and printmaker Jacob Landau and was influenced by sculptor, draftsman and graphic artist Leonard Baskin. He graduated in 1958, enlisted in the U.S. Army, and was stationed in Germany for 19 months. Kocsis married his college sweetheart, Carol Virginia Frearson, in 1961, and she became a favored model for his painting.

== Career ==
From 1961 to 1968, Kocsis worked as a book illustrator and, under the pseudonym J.C. Kocsis, illustrated more than 20 books, including Edge of Two Worlds (1968) by Weyman Jones, which won the 1969 Lewis Carroll Shelf Award. In 1965-67, Kocsis taught drawing and pictorial composition at his alma mater, the Philadelphia College of Art, and was a lecturer at Kutztown State Teachers College, now Kutztown University of Pennsylvania.

Feeling constrained by drawing, in 1968 Kocsis turned to painting full time. In 1972, he moved from Philadelphia to Bethlehem, PA, where he often recruited people from the street and local artists to pose in a studio provided by Lehigh University. He developed a unique style that he termed “psychic impressionism,” in which he said paintings sprang from his subconscious. Psychic Impressionism is exemplified by Kocsis’s 1970 painting Igneous Man (oil on linen, 51x37-1/2).

Over the next 30 years, from 1968 to when he stopped painting in 1999, Kocsis created more than 500 paintings. This period coincided with the neo-expressionist era in late 20th century American art, and Kocsis’s style shows affinity with the movement in his use of vibrant colors, passionate and energetic brush strokes, dense layers of paint, and large canvasses. While his paintings ranged from abstract to realistic, they always focused on a recognizable human face, particularly eyes, to depict human emotion.

Kocsis was fiercely independent and for many years had an obsessive fear of what he saw as a commercial art industrial complex and syndicate that he believed wanted to dictate what he would paint. He suffered bouts of severe paranoia and had a career-long loathing of art galleries and dealers, believing they corrupted the artistic process and wanted to exploit him. As a result, absent commercial representation, Kocsis spent much of his life aggressively promoting his art, for which he was occasionally ridiculed. He arranged his own private sales and organized his own shows, arranging 42 shows in more than two dozen countries on six continents over 35 years.

== Death ==
James Paul Kocsis died on Dec. 28, 2021, at the age of 85. He is buried in Nisky Hill Cemetery in Bethlehem, PA, next to his wife, Carol.

== Exhibitions ==
- 1974 – Colombia Museum of Art, Columbia, SC, USA
- 1976 – Harvard University, Cambridge, MA, USA
- 1979 – Sydney Opera House, Sydney, Australia
- 1982 – Jilin University, Changchun, People's Republic of China
- 1986 – Kendal Museum, Kendal, England.
- 1988 – Trinity College, Oxford University, Oxford, England
- 1990 -- Martin Luther King, Jr. Center for Nonviolent Social Change, Atlanta, Georgia, USA
- 1995 – India International Center and Gandhi Peace Foundation, New Delhi, Inia
- 1999 -- Casa de Cultura Jesus Reyes Heroles, Coyoacán, Mexico City, Mexico.
- 2003 -- The Academy of Athens University, Athens, Greece
- 2005 -- Hermitage Museum Library, St. Petersburg, and Dostoevsky Museum; Staraya, Russia
- 2009 -- Église St.-Germain l'Auxerrois, Paris, France.

== Bibliography ==
(Illustrated under the pseudonym J.C. Kocsis)

- Armer, Alberta. Steve and the Guide Dogs. Cleveland: The World Publishing Co., 1965. ASIN B0007DKFMS
- Reeves, James. The Strange Light. Chicago: Rand McNally, 1966. ISBN 978-0-434-95888-7
- Harmon, Lyn. Flight to Jewell Island. Philadelphia: J.B. Lippincott, 1967. ASIN B0006BPT5E
- Huston, Anne & Yolen, Jane. Trust a City Kid. Boston: Lothrop, Lee & Shepard Co. 1967. ASIN B000O566P4
- Glasgow, Aline. The Journey of Akbar, New York: The Dial Press, 1967. ASIN B002BZO7EC
- Williams, Anne Sinclair. Secret of the Round Tower. New York: Random House, 1968. ASIN B0006BVHK0
- Boldrini, Giuliana. The Etruscan Leopards. New York: Pantheon, 1968. ASIN B0006BU7MY
- Jones, Weyman. Edge of Two Worlds. New York: The Dial Press, 1968. ISBN 978-0-8037-2211-8
