= Frederick E. Hahn =

American violinist (1869–1942)

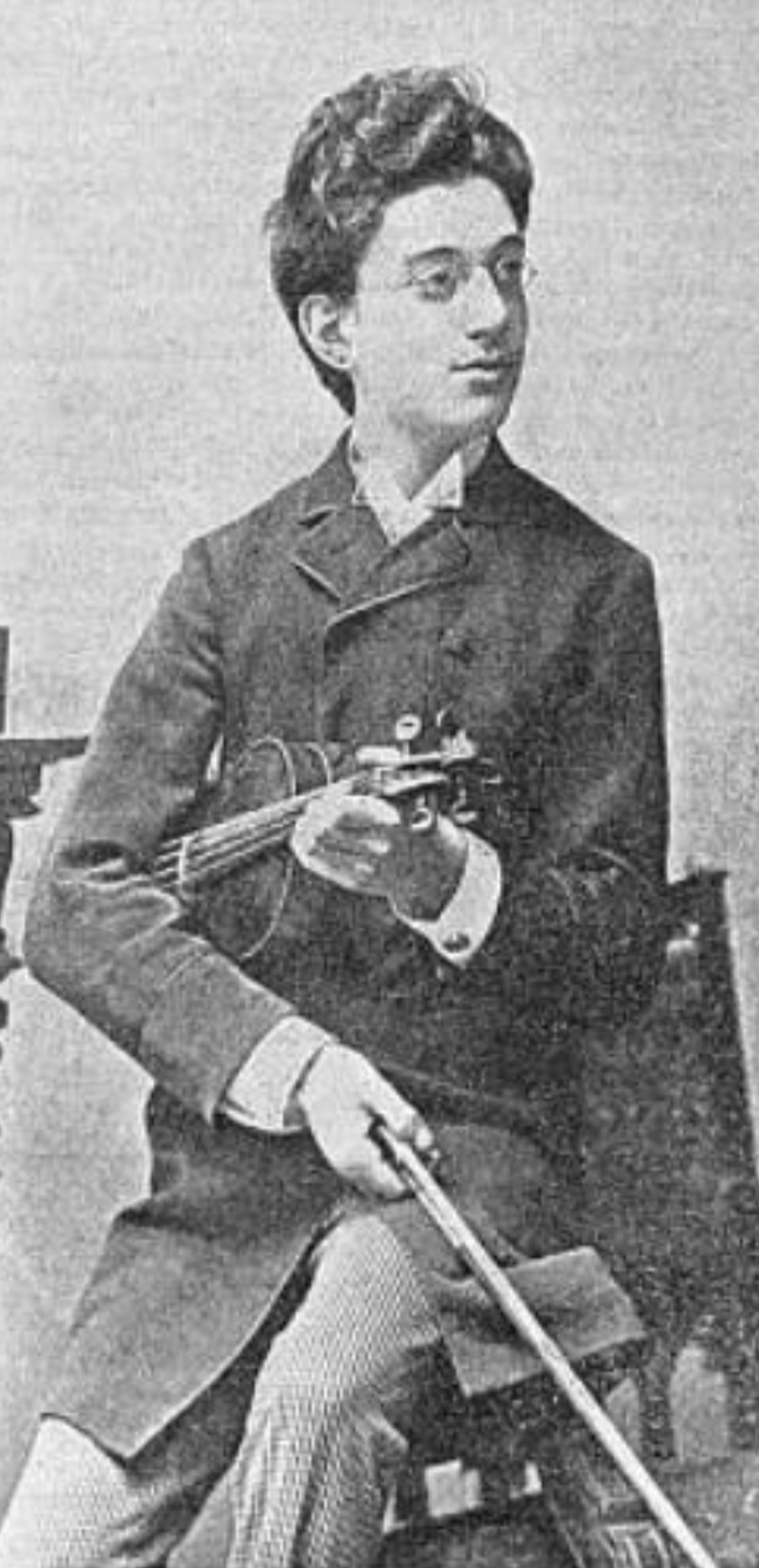
Frederick E. Hahn in 1890.

Frederick E. Hahn (March 23, 1869, New York City – November 25, 1942, Philadelphia) was an American violinist, composer, and music educator. He was longtime director of the Philadelphia Music Academy (later renamed the University of the Arts).

== Life and career ==
The son of Henry Hahn and his wife Clara Hahn (née Mayer), Frederick E. Hahn was born in New York City on March 23, 1869. In his youth he was educated at the Eastburn Academy in Philadelphia. His early music lessons were from his father who taught him violin. In 1885 he performed in a concert in Philadelphia sponsored by the Young Men's Hebrew Association.

Hahn went to Germany to train as a musician at the Leipzig Conservatory; traveling there in 1886 with fellow Philadelphia violinist Max Weil who was also studying at the school. His teacher in violin was Hans Sitt. He graduated there in 1890 and was awarded 1st prize for violin. While a student in Leipzig he was a violinist in the Leipzig Gewandhaus Orchestra. He made his debut as a solo concert violinist in Leipzig in 1890 performing Louis Spohr's Violin Concerto No.11, Op.70.

Hahn gave a concert tour of the United States in 1890-1891. This tour included performances with the pianist Constantin Sternberg and cellist Rudolph Hennig. His solo repertoire on this tour included Henryk Wieniawski's Polonaise brillante, Op. 21 and Spohr's Violin Concerto No.9, Op.55. In 1892 he was appointed first violinist of the Boston Symphony Orchestra (BSO). He remained in that position through 1896. He was also active as a member of the Boston Symphony Orchestral Club; a chamber group made up of member of the BSO.

In 1902 Hahn founded the Hahn Conservatory of Music in Philadelphia. In 1917 that school was merged into the Zeckwer-Hahn Philadelphia Musical Academy (ZHPMA; later renamed the University of the Arts). At this time he was appointed both president and director of the ZHPMA; a position he maintained until his death. He concurrently taught as the head of the violin faculty at the Braun School of Music in Pottsville, Pennsylvania from 1924 through 1932.

Hahn composed orchestral music, art songs, and works for solo violin. He also served as music editor for etudes and violin compositions. His book Practical Violin Study was published in 1930. He was awarded honorary doctorates from both the ZHPMA (1940) and the Curtis Institute of Music (1941).

Hahn died at Graduate Hospital in Philadelphia on November 25, 1942 at the age of 73. He never married. He was a member of the Sons of the American Revolution.
