= Mark Mann (artist) =

American artist (born 1970)

- Born: 1970 (age 54–55); Oklahoma City, Oklahoma, U.S.
- Occupation: Artist

Mark Mann (born 1970) is an American artist.

== Biography ==
Born in Oklahoma City, Oklahoma, Mann lives and works in Brooklyn, New York. His work has been purchased and collected by the Los Angeles County Museum of Art, Museum of Fine Arts, Houston, The Norton Museum of Art, Palm Beach, Florida, The George Eastman House, Rochester, New York, and the Progressive Corporate Collection.
