= Noel Mayo =

American industrial designer

Noel Mayo (December 30, 1937 – January 29, 2026) was an American industrial designer. He founded the first African American industrial design firm. His company, Noel Mayo Associates, has produced work for clients such as IBM, NASA, and the National Museum of American Jewish History.

== Early life ==
Mayo was born on December 30, 1937, in Orange, New Jersey to Noel and Blanche Mayo. As a child, he moved around a lot until middle school where he attended a boarding school in Cheney, Pennsylvania called Sunnycrest Farm for Negro Boys. In high school, he worked at an art store. The store owner allowed Mayo to borrow any art books he wanted. This is when he discovered industrial design. He attended the Philadelphia College of Art (now called the University of the Arts), and in 1960, became the first black person to receive an industrial design degree there.

== Career ==
During his junior year in college, his professor Joseph Carreiro, who was the head of the department at the time, hired Mayo to work for his firm Carreiro/Sklaroff Design Associates. While the owners were on an extended vacation, Mayo was given the responsibility of running the office. In 1964, after graduating, he bought the firm and changed its name to Noel Mayo Associates.

=== Noel Mayo Associates ===
Under his leadership, Noel Mayo Associates worked with clients across all industries. Clients include the Departments of Commerce and Agriculture, the IRS, NASA, IBM, Philadelphia International Airport, Black+Decker and the National Museum of American Jewish History. Noel Mayo Associates designed interiors for public and private spaces, furniture, electronics, lighting, signage, products, packaging, and graphics. Interiors include homes, airports, offices, schools, waiting rooms, stores, and restaurants. During a 45-year partnership with the Lutron Electronics company, his name appeared on over 250 design patents and 27 utility patents, most notably for light switches and dimmers.

=== Education and service ===
Mayo became chairperson of the industrial design department at the Philadelphia College of Art.

In 1989, Ohio State University named Noel Mayo the Ohio Eminent scholar in Art and Design Technology. He taught the school's Professional Practices course for 20 years.

Mayo served as president of the Philadelphia Economic Council and as president of the Philadelphia Community Development Corporation. He served as an advisor to MetroBank of Philadelphia as well as a commissioner of the Philadelphia Art Commission.

He served on the board of directors for University of the Arts and the board of directors for the Philadelphia Free Library.

In 1981, he was given an honorary D.F.A degree from the Massachusetts College of Art.

He established a directory of minority professionals working in design and established multiple mentoring programs for minorities working in design. In 2020, he created the Noel Mayo Scholarship Fund at the University of the Arts.
