= Miguel Angel Corzo =

American academic administrator

- Born: January 1, 1942 (age 84); Mexico City
- Education: BS, UCLA

Miguel Angel Corzo (born January 1, 1942) is an American arts administrator and consultant.

== Early life and education ==
Miguel Angel Corzo was born and raised in Mexico City. He completed an undergraduate degree in Civil Engineering from the University of California, Los Angeles in 1967.

== Professional life ==
Corzo became the first president and CEO of LA Plaza de Cultura y Artes in Los Angeles from August 2009 to September 2011. Corzo was president and CEO of The Colburn School in Los Angeles until October 2008. Prior to Colburn, between 2000 and June 2007, he was the president and CEO of the University of the Arts in Philadelphia.

As Corzo's tenure was ending at the University of the Arts, the university allocated a $5 million gift from Philadelphia-area philanthropist Dorrance Hill Hamilton and named its Center for the Creative Economy after him.

He was the director of the Getty Conservation Institute in Los Angeles from 1991 to 1998.

== Published works ==
- Mortality immortality? : the legacy of 20th-century art. OCLC 39658997.
