= Ben Rose (photographer) =

American photographer

Ben Rose (1916 – 1980) was an American photographer.

Ben Rose started as a photographer when he was a young man. He was graduated from the Pennsylvania Museum and School of Industrial Art in 1938 and where he taught Photography and Advertising Photography from 1945–1950. His first show at the A-D Galley was in 1941 with Arnold Newman with whom he had grown up in Atlantic City. He has been noted for his contribution of high technology and electronics to photography by designer Louis Dorfman.

He, together with Irving Penn, was part of the "Philadelphia Group" that had studied with Alexey Brodovitch in the 1930s.

== Books ==
Books that have been illustrated with Ben Rose's photography include:

- Picture Cookbook by The Editors of LIFE, Mary Hamman, Editor, New York, NY: Time, Inc., 1958. Second edition 1959, Third edition 1960.

Magazines that have been illustrated with Ben Rose's photography includes:

- PORTFOLIO. A MAGAZINE FOR THE GRAPHIC ARTS: by Frank Zachary [Editor], Alexey Brodovitch [Art Director]: Cincinnati. Zebra Press, Volume 1, Number 2, Summer 1950. First Edition. Folio.
