= Bascove =

American artist

Anne Bascove
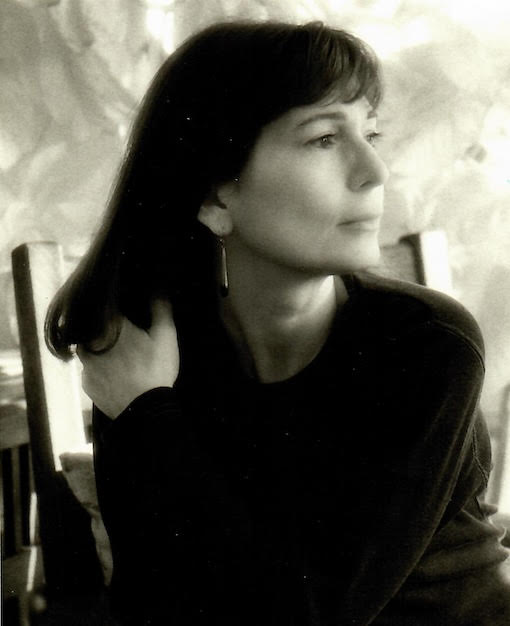
- Born: 1946 (age 79–80); Philadelphia, Pennsylvania
- Education: Philadelphia College of Art
- Notable work: Bridges series
- Spouse: Michael Avramides
- Website: http://www.bascove.com

Anne Bascove (born 1946), commonly credited by the mononym Bascove, is an American artist. She's a painter, printmaker, and collager. She is noted for images of bridges, book covers, and her celebration of books and reading. She was born in Philadelphia, Pennsylvania, and received her B.A. from the University of the Arts in Philadelphia.

She has edited three collections of her paintings with related writings: Sustenance and Desire: A Food Lover's Anthology of Sensuality and Humor (2004, ISBN 978-1-56792-277-6), Where Books Fall Open: A Reader's Anthology of Wit & Passion (2001, ISBN 978-1-56792-251-6) and Stone and Steel: Paintings and Writings Celebrating the Bridges of New York City (1998, ISBN 978-1-56792-081-9).

Bascove has worked with The New York, Brooklyn, and Roosevelt Island Historical Societies, and has lectured and arranged events with the Museum of the City of New York, the Central Park Conservancy, the New York City Department of Parks and Recreation, the Municipal Art Society, NYU Fales Library, and the Hudson River Museum.

She currently resides in New York City with her husband, architect Michael Avramides.

== Early influences and education ==
Bascove's artistic journey began at age ten when her mother enrolled her in the Philadelphia Museum of Art's Children's Saturday Classes. Her maternal grandfather, a concert pianist trained in Romania, also contributed to Bascove’s early artistic influences. While working as a contractor in America, he spent weekends playing piano and meticulously copying classic Italian and French oil paintings, exposing Bascove to a world of art books from a young age.

At the Philadelphia College of Art (now the University of the Arts in Philadelphia), Bascove studied both Commercial courses (primarily Illustration) and Fine Art, focusing on Painting and Printmaking. In the latter, she was mentored by Claire Van Vliet, who fostered her passion for working with books. Though she explored various printmaking techniques, wood carving resonated most with her due to its tactile and flexible nature. Influenced by German Expressionism and Symbolist Movements, which she found emotionally akin to her favorite Russian and German authors, Bascove discovered a versatile artistic language encompassing styles from Medieval Art to Die Brücke.

== Work as illustrator ==
In her junior year (1967), Bascove and her mother took her school portfolio to New York City. Publishers were largely unreceptive, as book cover illustration was considered a job reserved for men while female illustrators usually worked in the fields of children's books and fashion. Despite the initial discouragement, she was given free-lance work from Redbook Magazine. When she began illustrating children's books, she consistently advocated for and insisted on the inclusion of children of color. This persistence earned her a reputation, and she began receiving requests for stories featuring diverse races.

After amassing a collection of published young adult and college book jacket samples, she was hired by art director Harris Lewine at Harcourt Brace Jovanovich. There, she illustrated the work of Alice Walker, Virginia Woolf, Italo Calvino, and Simenon.

Around the same time, Bascove started working for Steve Heller at The New York Times, illustrating the OpEd and Book Review sections. These opportunities allowed her to create thoughtful and impactful political imagery. Her reputation for representing diverse cultures extended to adult books and political assignments. The political work for the New York Times, The Progressive, Ms Magazine and many books, particularly those by South African authors such as André Brink and J.M. Coetzee, often required emotionally charged and sometimes dark visuals.

After illustrating for Ms. Magazine, Bascove contributed to the acclaimed children's book Free To Be You & Me by Marlo Thomas and the Ms. Foundation for Women. As more women entered the publishing industry, Bascove collaborated with Louise Fili at Pantheon on various projects including covers for John Berger and Ariel Dorfman. What would later be considered among her most notable cover work was produced with Neil Stuart at Viking/Penguin for authors Robertson Davies, J. M. Coetzee, and T. Coraghessan Boyle and with Krystyna Skalski at Harcourt and Grove Press for Aharon Appelfeld, Thomas Mann, Reinaldo Arenas, and Penelope Lively. At Warner Books, Jackie Merri Meyer facilitated her collaborations with Jerome Charyn and Ellis Peters.

== Painting ==
Bascove took time off from illustration in 1977 to study Jungian imagery and focus on painting in Paris. She also took on illustration jobs in England and France to extend her stay. Her initial paintings featured female imagery, often sexual. During her frequent excursions with her dog along the Seine on Sundays, she began painting the nearby bridges using watercolors.

Upon returning to New York in 1980, her art evolved to depict dreaming figures and people reading, reflecting a state akin to dreaming, as she sought to capture moments of tranquility. Her friends and their children frequently served as models. These works often included nudes or women in front of divided reflections, offering commentary on historical paintings or a female perspective on the "male gaze." As Robert Cozzolino explains in The Female Gaze: Women Artists Making Their World, "Bascove …. bases her compositions on geometry, the grid, and the principle of the golden section to create carefully constructed orderly arrangements of simplified forms… The ambiguity of space and multiple perspectives are equally important in her work and stylized paintings have been described as mysterious, luscious, and sensual."

During this period, Bascove also began paintings of New York City bridges. Critics have described these "jewel-toned" paintings as "mesmerizing,” “ever-so-hauntingly dramatic,” “truly iconic…, as though the fundamental identity [of the bridges] has been revealed for the first time," while also being "feminine.” R. Haw in The Art of the Brooklyn Bridge argues that “[Bascoves’s] canvases have re-energized and transformed our understanding of the city's rugged industrial landscape….[B]y imbuing the city's muscular limbs with such feminine grace, Bascove has managed to out-Georgia O'Keeffe Georgia O'Keeffe. No easy task." Similarly, Mary Gordon, in her introduction to Bascove's Stone and Steel, explains that

[Bascove] is a woman looking at bridges, which have always been the dreamwork and workplace of men. She has staked her claim to a vision no one told her she was born to, and yet of course she was born to it. The controlled wildness, the combination of menace and safety that have always marked her work find a perfect subject in bridges, whose inspiration is nature, but which defy nature; enablers of travel that appear to be still and yet tremble and sigh and shudder, with the secret, terrifying force of all great lovers.

== Collage ==
After decades of drawing and painting New York City's bridges, Bascove began to arrange and reconstruct her research photographs, reassembling the geometry and architectural details of their structures. These compositions, made from her photographs, integrate drawing, gouache, or collage, re-examining and interpreting the subjects in various new configurations. They convey an experience of movement and dislocation, where elements fly beyond their boundaries or implode.

In her “Books” series, Bascove returned to her interest in books and reading by creating photomontages and collages from book pages and typography along with images of typewriter and computer keys, movable type, and metal stencils to depict how words gain meaning when printed.

Bascove’s "Collage and Feminism: The Seamstress Series" was inspired by Jerome Charyn's A Loaded Gun, a book on Emily Dickinson, which led Bascove to reread Dickinson's poetry. Bascove connected with Dickinson's "A Spider Sewed at Night," a poem where Dickinson likened her poetic process to a spider spinning its web and with women's lifelong practice of sewing. This resonated with Bascove's own family history of women engaging in needlework. Her teenage grandmother and family, upon arriving from Ellis Island, performed piecework and hand-sewing for survival. An aunt sewed costumes for the Philadelphia Grand Opera Company. Emily Wore White marked the first collage in the Seamstress Series. Bascove embedded her mother's needles, pins, and thread, lace pieces from a friend's aunt, fabric scraps from other friends, and a lace collar found in France to which Bascove added her own sewing. Small reproductions throughout the work pay homage to two other female arachnophiles: artist Louise Bourgeois and botanist Maria Sibylla Merian.

== Exhibitions ==
This is a partial list of Bascove's mostly solo exhibitions:

Museum of the City of New York, NY • Hudson River Museum, NY • U.S. Department of State, Art in Embassies • The Norman Rockwell Museum, Stockbridge, MA • Pennsylvania Academy of the Fine Arts, Philadelphia, PA • The Noble Maritime Collection, NY • The Arsenal Gallery in Central Park • The National Arts Club • The Municipal Art Society • The Trenton City Museum • The New York Historical Society • Galerie Luc Queyrel • Uptown Gallery • ACA Galleries• Art on Link • Jung Institute • University of Massachusetts • Flinn Gallery • NYU Fales Library • Musée de Cherbourg, France.

== Public Collections ==
Non-private permanent collections of Bascove’s work may be found at

Museum of the City of New York, NY • The New York Historical Society • Hudson River Museum, NY • U.S. Department of State, Art in Embassies • MTA, Arts for Transit, NY • The Norman Rockwell Museum, Stockbridge, MA • University of Texas at Tyler, TX • Pennsylvania Academy of the Fine Arts, Philadelphia, PA • Washington University in St. Louis, MO • Massey College, Toronto, Canada • Mount Sinai School of Medicine, NY • The Noble Maritime Collection, NY • Harry Ransom Collection, University of Texas at Austin, TX • The New York Public Library, NY • University of Toronto, Canada • Rachofsky Collection, TX • The Wittliff Collections, Texas State University, TX • Norwalk Transit District, Norwalk, CT • Special Collections at Vanderbilt University, Nashville, TN • Oresman Collection, NY • Musée de Cherbourg, France.
