= David Graham (photographer) =

American photographer and academic

David Graham (born 1952, Abington, Pennsylvania) is an American artist photographer and professor at the University of the Arts in Philadelphia. He currently lives and works in De Pere, Wisconsin. Embracing popular forms of American photography (the snapshot, family portrait, and vacation photo), David Graham explores contemporary culture through the idiosyncratic nature of the American landscape. His work is in many collections, including the Museum of Modern Art, New York City; the San Francisco Museum of Modern Art; the Art Institute of Chicago; the Philadelphia Museum of Art; the George Eastman House, Rochester, New York; the International Center of Photography, New York City; and the Brooklyn Museum, New York. He is represented by the Laurence Miller Gallery in New York City, Etherton Gallery in Tucson, Arizona, and the PDNB Gallery in Dallas, Texas.

== Selected solo exhibitions ==
- 2019 Etherton Gallery, Tucson, Arizona
- 2015 Wessel + O'Connor, Lambertville, New Jersey
- 2015 Where We Live, Laurence Miller Gallery, New York, New York
- 2014 Fabric Workshop and Museum, Philadelphia, Pennsylvania
- 2014 35 Pictures / 35 Years, Gallery 339, Philadelphia, Pennsylvania
- 2008 Almost Paradise, Gallery 339, Philadelphia, Pennsylvania
- 2008 Silver Eye Gallery, Pittsburgh, Pennsylvania
- 2007 PDNB Gallery, Dallas, Texas
- 2004 Declaring Independence, Catherine Edelman Gallery, Chicago, Illinois
- 2004 James A. Michener Art Museum, Doylestown, Pennsylvania
- 2003 Alone Together, The Print Center, Philadelphia, Pennsylvania
- 2003 Kathleen Ewing Gallery, Washington, D.C.
- 2002 Erie Art Museum, Erie, Pennsylvania
- 2002 Ricco/Maresca Gallery, New York, New York
- 2002 Paul Kopeikin Gallery, Los Angeles, California
- 2002 Erie Art Museum, Erie, Pennsylvania
- 2001 Michener Art Museum, Doylestown, Pennsylvania
- 2000 Burden Gallery, New York, New York 2000
- 1999 Institute for Contemporary Art, Philadelphia, Pennsylvania
- 1999 Snyderman Gallery, Philadelphia, Pennsylvania
- 1998 Menschel Gallery, Syracuse University, New York 1998
- 1994 Locks Gallery, Philadelphia, Pennsylvania
- 1991 Institute for Contemporary Art, Philadelphia, Pennsylvania
- 1991 Laurence Miller Gallery, New York, New York
- 1989 Laurence Miller Gallery, New York, New York
- 1987 Laurence Miller Gallery, New York, New York
- 1987 International Center of Photography, New York, New York
- 1986 Allentown Art Museum, Allentown, Pennsylvania
- 1986 Photographic Resource Center, Boston, Massachusetts
- 1985 Armstrong Gallery, New York, New York
- 1985 Cleveland Center for Contemporary Art, Cleveland, Ohio

== Selected group exhibitions ==
- 2022. Wisconsin Artists Biennial, Museum of Wisconsin Art, West Bend, Wisconsin
- 2022 newARTSpace I, newARTSpace, De Pere, Wisconsin
- 2021. Through the Lens, James A. Michener Museum, Doylestown, Pennsylvania
- 2020. Signs of the Times, PDNB Gallery, Dallas, Texas
- 2020. Photographs of the Week, #85, Laurence Miller Gallery, New York, New York
- 2019 Betwixt & Between, Laurence Miller Gallery, New York, New York
- 2018 Architecture Itself and Other Postmodernist Myths, Canadian Centre for Architecture, Montreal, Canada
- 2017 The Duck & the Document: True Stories of Postmodern Procedures, SCI-Arc & Princeton University, New Jersey
- 2017 Circles, Laurence Miller Gallery, New York, New York
- 2016 Kentucky Captured, Speed Art Museum, Louisville, Kentucky
- 2016 Small Things Considered, Laurence Miller Gallery, New York, New York
- 2016 Tete a Tete, James A. Michener Museum of Art, Doylestown, Pennsylvania
- 2016 Paris Photo Revisited, Laurence Miller Gallery, New York, New York
- 2014 Small Things Considered, Laurence Miller Gallery, New York, New York
- 2013 William Eggleston and his Circle, PDNB Gallery, Dallas, Texas
- 2012 Man Made Color, Laurence Miller Gallery, New York, NU
- 2011 Flora & Fauna, Salt Gallery, Philadelphia, Pennsylvania
- 2009 Snapshots on the Way to the Real World, University of the Arts, Philadelphia, Pennsylvania
- 2007 Pink at Perkins: The Contradictory Character of a Complex Color, Perkins Center for the Arts, Moorestown, New Jersey
- 2006 Second Woodmere Triennial of Contemporary Photography, Woodmere Art Museum, Philadelphia, Pennsylvania
- 2005 Heartfelt, Florida State University, Tallahassee, Florida
- 2003 Home, Ricco/Maresca, New York, New York
- 2003 Maine ASAP, Northeast Harbor, Maine
- 2002 Elvis, Howard Greenburg Gallery, New York, New York
- 2002 Re/viewing Photography, University of the Arts, Philadelphia, Pennsylvania
- 2002 Bucks County Portraits, Doylestown, Pennsylvania
- 2001 Pretty, Ricco/Maresca Gallery, New York, New York
- 2001 Family, Laurence Miller Gallery, New York, New York
- 2001 Murals, Deutsche Bank, New York, New York
- 2000 Open Ends, Museum of Modern Art, New York, New York
- 2000 Bienniel 2000, Delaware Art Museum, Wilmington, Delaware
- 1999 Wonderland, Noorderlicht Fotofest, Netherlands
- 1998 Four American Photographers, Athens, Greece
- 1997 BANG! The Gun as Image, Florida State University, Tallahassee, Florida
- 1997 Las Vegas, Paul Kopeikin Gallery, Los Angeles, California
- 1996 Howard Finster's Paradise Garden, Fay Gold Gallery, Atlanta, Georgia
- 1993 Home, Noorderlicht Fotofest, Netherlands
- 1992 Our Town, Burden Gallery, New York, New York
- 1991 Pivot, Mostyn Art Gallery, Gwynedd, North Wales
- 1991 Nuclear Matters, SF Camerawork, San Francisco, California
- 1990 Landscapes, Rockwell Museum, Corning, New York
- 1989 Fire Sites, Museum of Contemporary Photography, Chicago, Illinois
- 1988 Photographic Truth, Bruce Museum, Greenwich, Connecticut
- 1988 Alteradiants, Austin College, Sherman, Texas

== Grants ==
- Pennsylvania Council on the Arts, 2001, 1999, 1997 & 1987
- English Speaking Union, Philadelphia, Pennsylvania, Executed in Great Britain 1990 & 1987
- ASMP/Nikon Emerging Photographer Award, New York, 1986
- National Endowment for the Arts, Washington, D.C, 1984

== Monographs ==
- In Plain Sight, David Graham with W.M. Hunt, EyeShot Publisher, 2022
- Almost Paradise, David Graham, Pond Press, 2008
- Declaring Independence, David Graham, Pond Press, 2004
- The Christmas List, David Graham, Quirk Books, 2003
- Alone Together, David Graham, Pond Press, 2002
- Taking Liberties, David Graham, Pond Press, 2001
- Land of the Free, David Graham with Andrei Codrescu, Aperture, 1999
- Ay, Cuba!, w/Andrei Codrescu, St. Martins Press, 1999
- David Graham, Past & Present Tense, Lightwork, 1998
- Road Scholar, w/Andrei Codrescu, Hyperion, 1993
- Only in America, David Graham, Knopf, 1991
- American Beauty, David Graham, Aperture 1987
