= Olaf Skoogfors =

American jeweler (1930–1975)

- Born: Gustav Olaf Jansson; June 27, 1930; Bredsjo, Sweden
- Died: December 20, 1975 (aged 45); Mount Airy, Pennsylvania
- Education: Philadelphia Museum School of Art in Philadelphia, Pennsylvania and The School for American Craftsmen in Rochester, New York
- Known for: Metalsmith, educator
- Style: lost-wax casting, fusing, reticulation

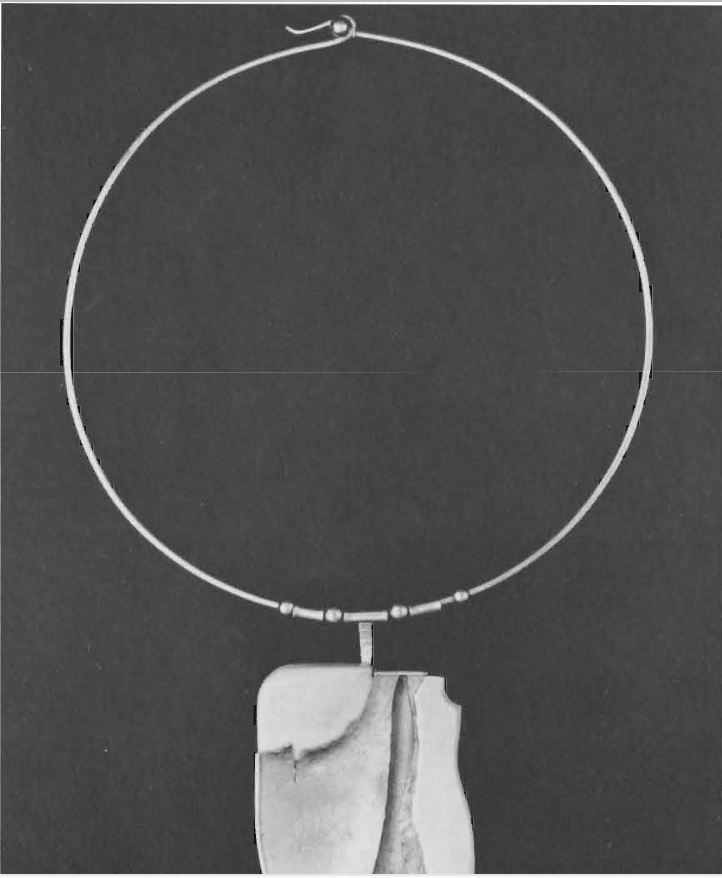
Olaf Skoogfors, 'Necklace' from American Metal Work, 1976

Olaf Skoogfors was an artist, metalsmith and educator until his death in 1975, at the age of 45.

== Early life and education ==
Olaf Skoogfors was born in a backwoods iron center in Bredsjo, Sweden, on June 27, 1930. When he was four years old, he and his family came to the United States and settled in Wilmington, Delaware. After three years the family moved back to Sweden and returned to the United States, Philadelphia, at the beginning of World War II.

He studied drawing at the Graphic Sketch Club and graduated from Olney High School in 1949.

He continued his education with Virginia Wireman and Richard Reinhardt at the Philadelphia Museum School of Art. Having served in the U.S. Army from 1953 till 1955, Skoogfors began his studies at The School for American Craftsmen in Rochester, New York.

== Career ==
In 1957 Skoogfors moved back to Philadelphia and established his first shop in the west of the town. In 1961 he joined the faculty at Philadelphia College of Art and began to teach there.

=== Additional affiliations ===
In 1969 he became chairman and associate professor of the craft department and two years later a full professor. In 1969 Skoogfors was founding member of the Society of North American Goldsmiths (SNAG).

== Material and cultural impact ==
Skoogfors felt the most important concern in his work was the technique/means he used to express an image. He worked with assemblages and used imagery from nature. This imagery manifested in texture and surface related to landscapes or sensuous forms of the human body. His intent was to create jewelry incorporating a meaningful statement about form, texture, color, and image. He regarded his jewelry as compositions and the scale was determined by the human body. He embellished his compositions with moonstones and pearls.

Skoogfors often used the lost-wax casting process. He was introduced to lost-wax casting in metal by Ruth Radakovich and Svetozar Radakovich. This process enabled Skoogfors to create more sculptural forms. He also used fusing, reticulation and chasing techniques in his work. Skoogfors referred to himself as a constructionist by inclination – he liked to build directly in metal. He was also strongly influenced by another master craftsman at Rochester, Danish trained Jack Prip, with whom he remained lifelong friends.

Olaf Skoogfors led a distinguished career in the metalsmithing field. Skoogfors considered himself an artist and a craftsman. He had many exhibitions, making his work accessible to his students and fellow craftsmen. The Philadelphia Museum of Art houses ten pieces of his work in their collections, including pins, pendants, necklaces, a chalice and a teapot.

== Death ==
On December 21, 1975 the age of 45, Skoogfors died from a heart attack at his home.

== Private life ==
Skoogfor was married to former Judy Gesensway and had two daughters, Kerstin and Mia. Skoogfors' brother, Leif Skoogfors (b. 1940) is a noted photojournalist and documentary photographer.

== Awards ==
- 1963 Contemporary Jewelry International
- 1967 $1,000 Tiffany prize

== Quotes ==
- "I wanted to design with my hands, to make something I could see and hold. After Moving to Philadelphia, I found my most satisfactory outlet in the silver department at the Museum College of Art."
- "Two aspects of jewelry interest me the most, the image itself and the characteristics of the material from which it is made."
