= Yam Ben Adiva (Yambo) =

Yambo
- Born: Yam Ben Adiva; 1989 (age 36–37); Akko, Israel
- Occupations: Artist, designer, director
- Known for: Digital art, CGI, 3D motion design

Yam Ben Adiva (born 1989), known professionally as Yambo, is an Israeli digital artist and creative director based in Tel Aviv. He is the founder of Yambo Studio and co-founder of the digital-art platform Dissrup. Adiva’s work explores the relationship between digital and physical media, and his projects have been exhibited at the Haifa Museum of Art, Design Museum Holon, and Eretz Israel Museum. His practice has been covered in independent media.

== Early life ==
Adiva was born in 1989 in Akko, Israel. He grew up in a creative household and taught himself digital tools before pursuing work in computer-generated imagery (CGI) and design. In an interview with Visual Atelier, he stated that he began creating digital art more than a decade ago, starting with 3D software such as Cinema 4D R11.

== Career ==
=== Yambo Studio ===
Adiva founded Yambo Studio in 2014. The studio produces CGI and motion design for technology and consumer sectors. Stash profiled the studio’s collaboration with Wix on the Wix Studio launch film (2023), crediting both the Wix in-house motion team and Yambo Studio.

The studio has also contributed visual assets to projects associated with Microsoft’s Flipgrid platform. Adobe’s Behance Blog featured the Microsoft Flipgrid Backgrounds project, which lists Yambo Studio among the credited creators.

=== Dissrup ===
In 2021, Adiva launched Dissrup, an online platform for digital and hybrid (“phygital”) art. The Jerusalem Post and Haaretz reported that Dissrup sought to connect digital and physical art forms, and Visual Atelier later mentioned the platform in a discussion of changes in NFT marketplaces and resale practices.

== Artistic practice ==
Adiva’s work combines CGI and 3D motion design with physical media. Since 2023, his practice has included Objects, a sculptural series that incorporates AI-generated imagery with ceramics and other crafted works, with the resulting physical pieces later reinterpreted in digital form. He has directed a design studio that produced CGI and motion projects for commercial clients.

His work has been presented in institutional exhibitions, including the Tel Aviv Biennale of Crafts and Design at the Eretz Israel Museum, Color at Design Museum Holon, and Desktop: A Physical Exhibition about a Digital Era at the Haifa Museum of Art.

== Projects (selected) ==
- Wix Studio launch film (2023)
- Vivo iQOO “Monster Inside” trailer (2019)
- Hydraink Product Showcase (2019)
- Geffen Towers architectural visualization (2017)
