= Scott Henderson (disambiguation) =

Scott Henderson (born 1954) is an American jazz fusion and blues guitarist.

Scott Henderson may also refer to:

- Scott Henderson (alpine skier), Canadian skier
- Scott Henderson (golfer) (born 1969), Scottish golfer
- Scott Henderson (designer), American industrial designer

== See also ==
- Scoot Henderson (born 2004), American basketball player
