= Scott Henderson (designer) =

American industrial designer

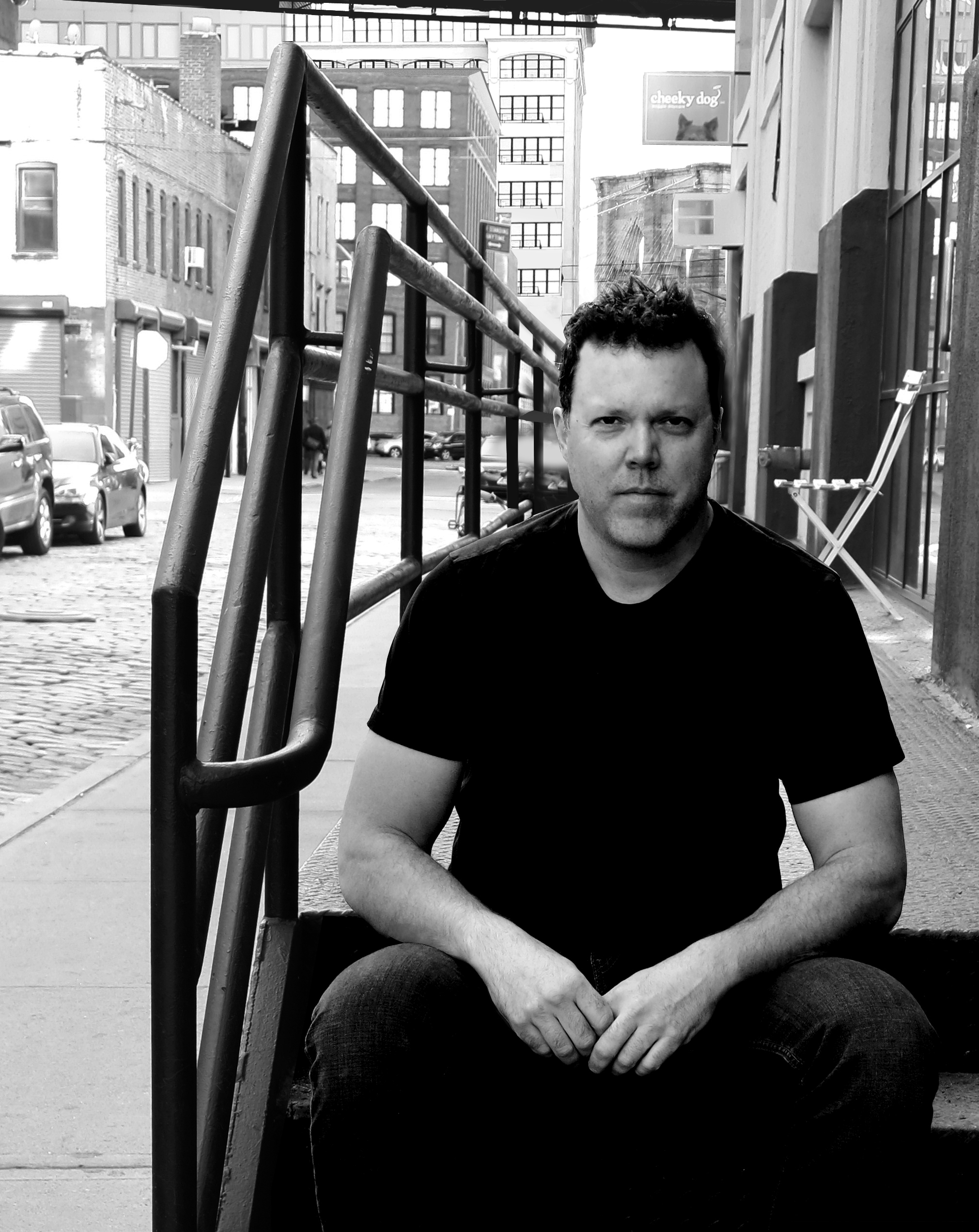
- Born: April 5, 1966 (age 60)
- Occupation: Industrial Designer
- Website: https://scotthendersoninc.com/

Scott Henderson, born April 5, 1966, is an American industrial designer, inventor and television personality who is best known for designing everyday consumer products. He studied industrial design at The University of the Arts under Noel Mayo, D.F.A. (Hon.) and Charles H Burnette, PhD, and began working as a product designer in 1988 when he joined the Sonneman Design Group, in New York City.

== Life and career ==
In 1990, Henderson joined the New York-based firm of Walter Dorwin Teague and Associates. In 1993, Henderson joined the New York City based design firm Smart Design where he worked until August 2003, when he founded his eponymously named design firm, Scott Henderson Inc. where he continues to work today.

Since 2019, he has been a judge and presenter on the television show America By Design Innovation series which airs on CBS. In 2003, Henderson chaired the IDSA International Design Conference, and was named Design Ambassador representing the United States at the Messe Frankfurt Ambiente trade fair in Germany in 2015.

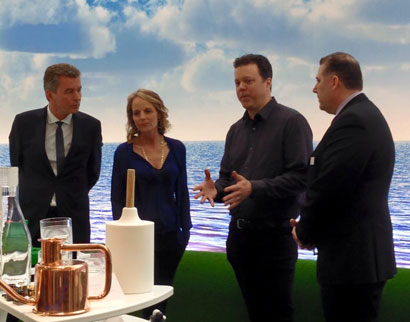
Ambiente, 2015

The award-winning face shield he designed in 2020 allows full view of a person’s face and was worn by Michelle Obama, Brad Pitt, Reese Witherspoon, Martin Sheen, Sandra Bullock, Adrien Brody, and Jennifer Aniston. Another of Henderson’s popular designs, the Moby Spout Cover, has become so ubiquitous in American households with new babies that the product was parodied by Pixar in the Toy Story era short film, Partysaurus Rex.

=== Early life and influences ===
Henderson grew up in Yorktown Heights, New York, in a household with one other sibling. From an early age, Scott’s life revolved around art, drawing and painting. He cites Frank Frazetta, Salvador Dali, Norman Rockwell, Edward Hopper and Walt Disney as influences.

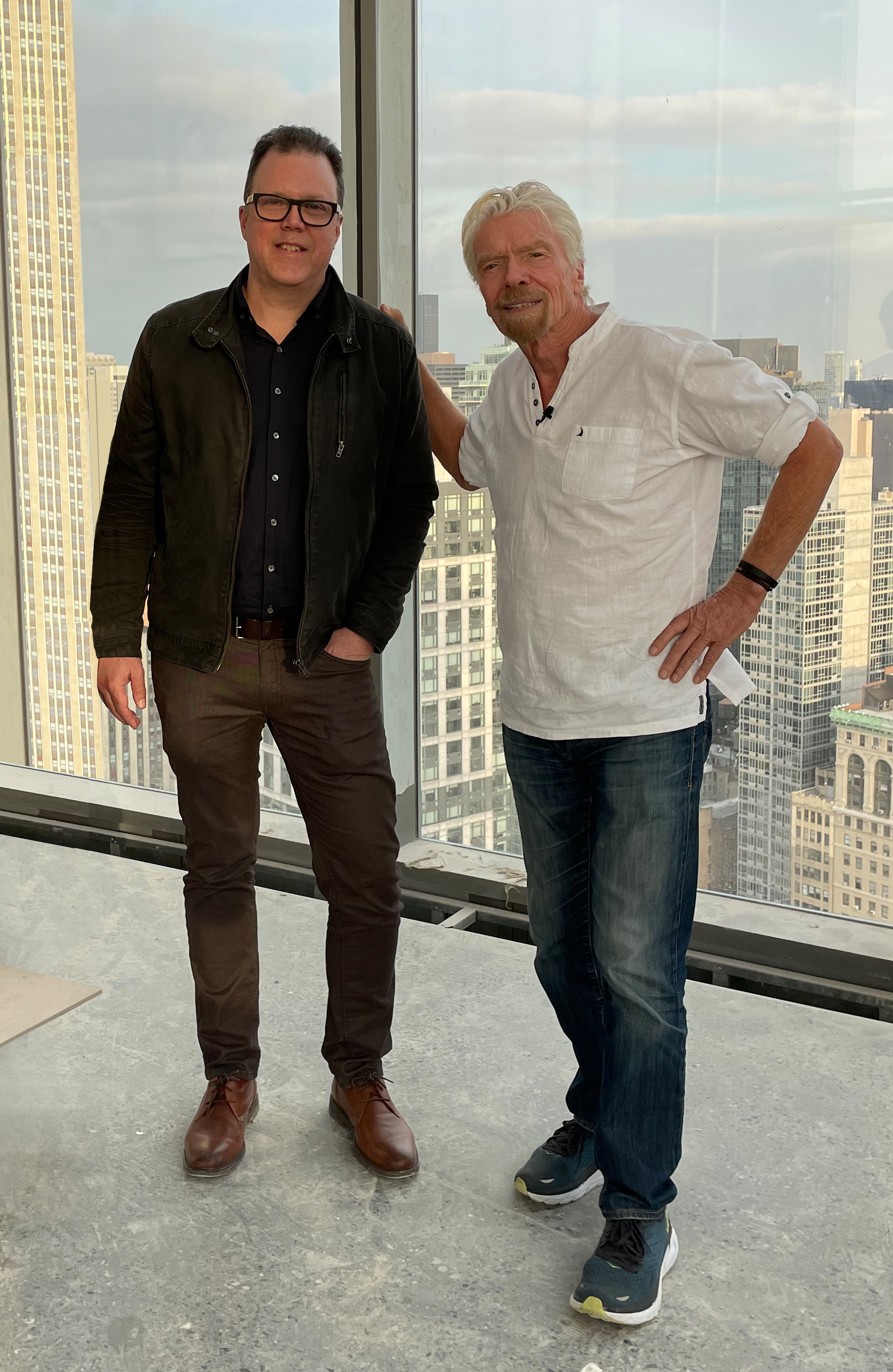
Scott Henderson with Sir Richard Branson, 2023

== Awards and honors ==
Henderson’s work is in the permanent collections of the Brooklyn Museum, the Cooper Hewitt Smithsonian National Design Museum, and the Alessi Museum. Sixteen products he designed have been included for sale at the Museum of Modern Art's MoMA Design Store.

His work has been exhibited by the San Jose Museum of Art, the Holon Museum in Israel, the Brussels Design Museum, the Triennial De Milano Design Museum, and the Walker Art Center. In 2023, his work was exhibited in the Saachi Gallery in London. He is the recipient of more than fifty international design awards including:

- 2023 Red Dot Award for Victoria Signature Cookware
- 2021 Core 77 Design Awards Notable Honor for ZShield
- 2020 Fast Company Innovation by Design Awards, Best Design North America for the ZShield
- 2020 IDSA Award of Special Recognition for inspiration to the industry
- 2009 IDSA Professional Honor Award, North East District for contributions to the field

=== Patents and publications ===
Henderson is named as inventor on more than fifty US patents, and has written extensively on product design.

== Gallery of works ==
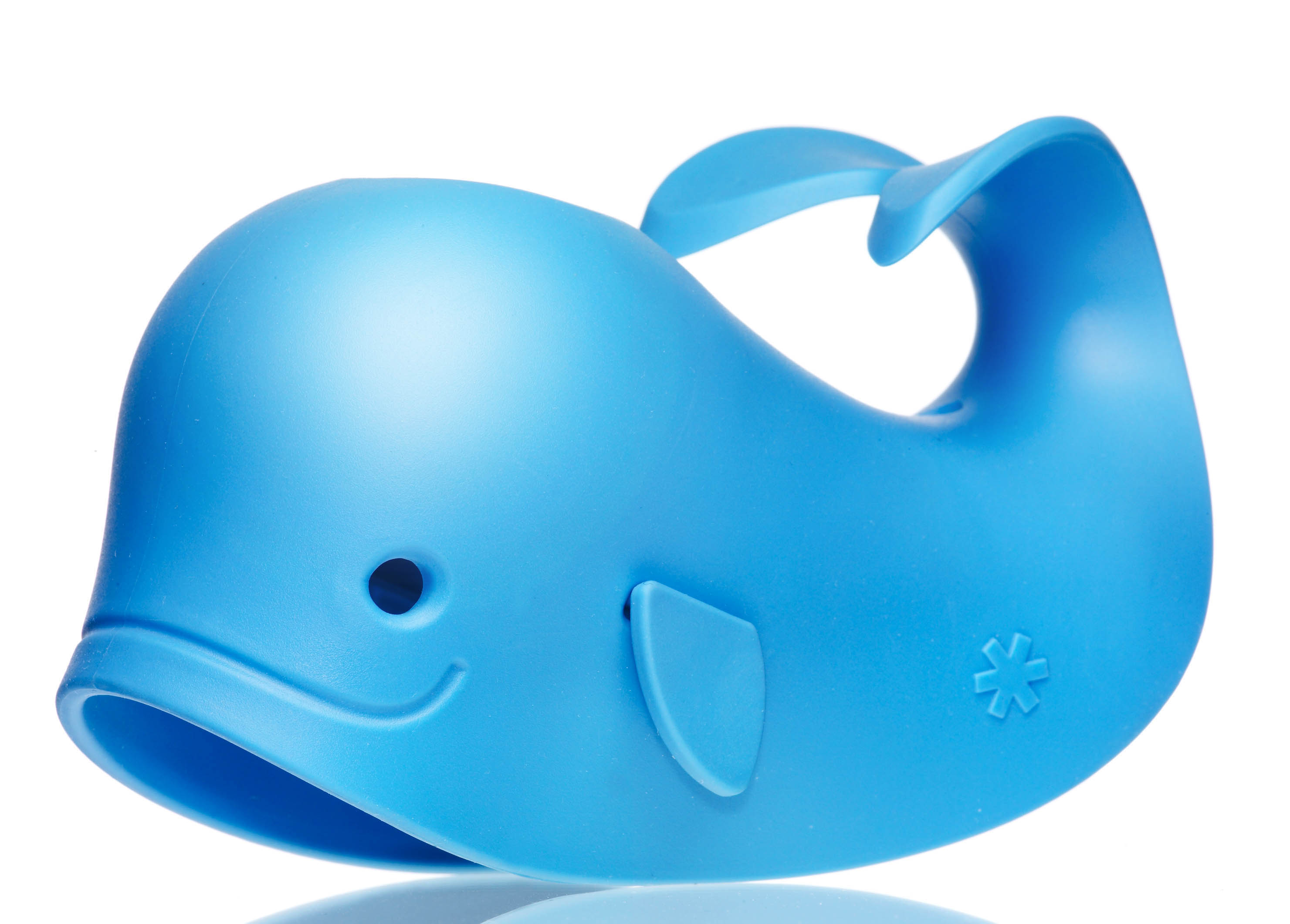
Moby Spout Cover, 2008

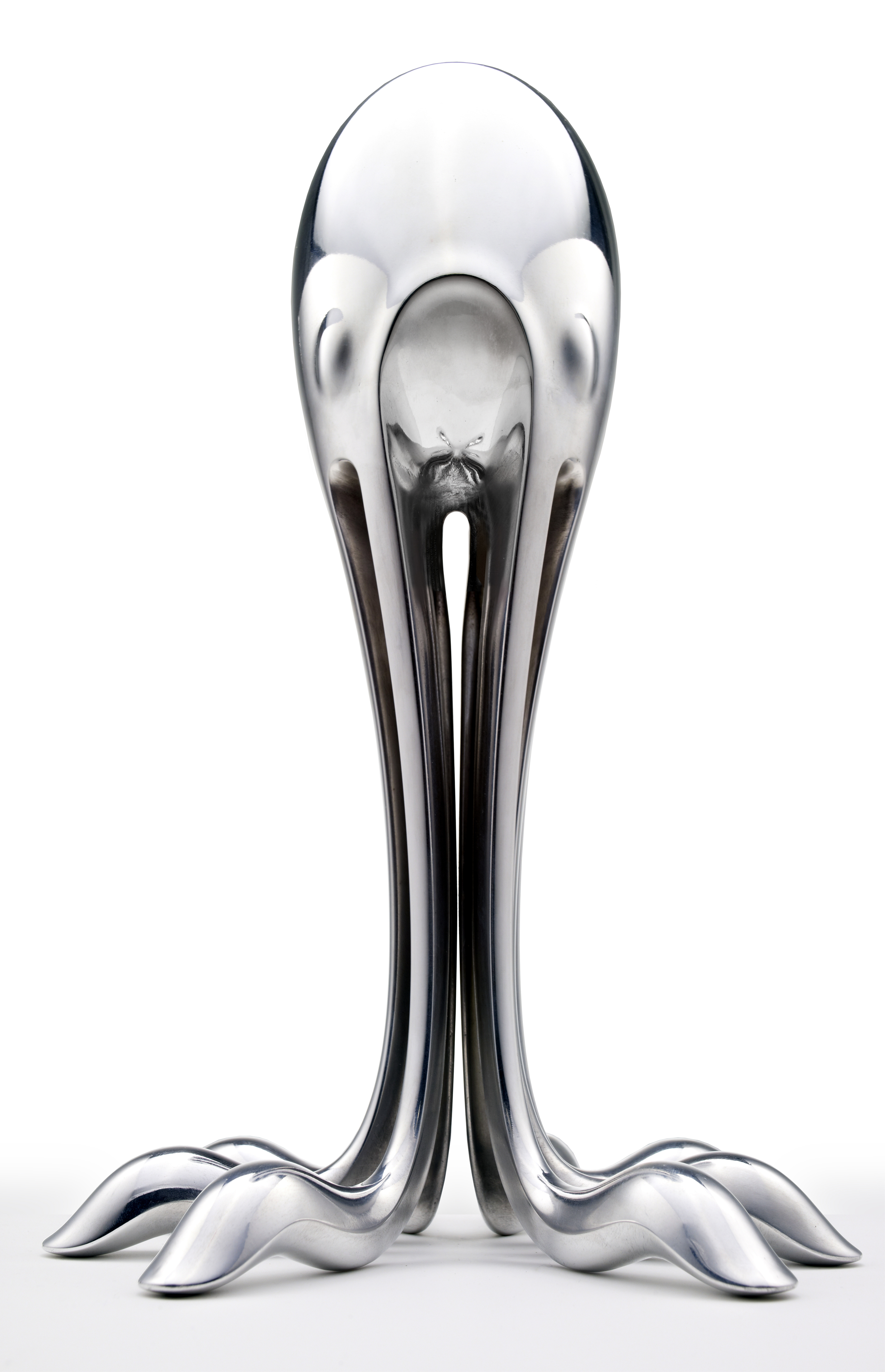
Vulgaris sculpture, 2011

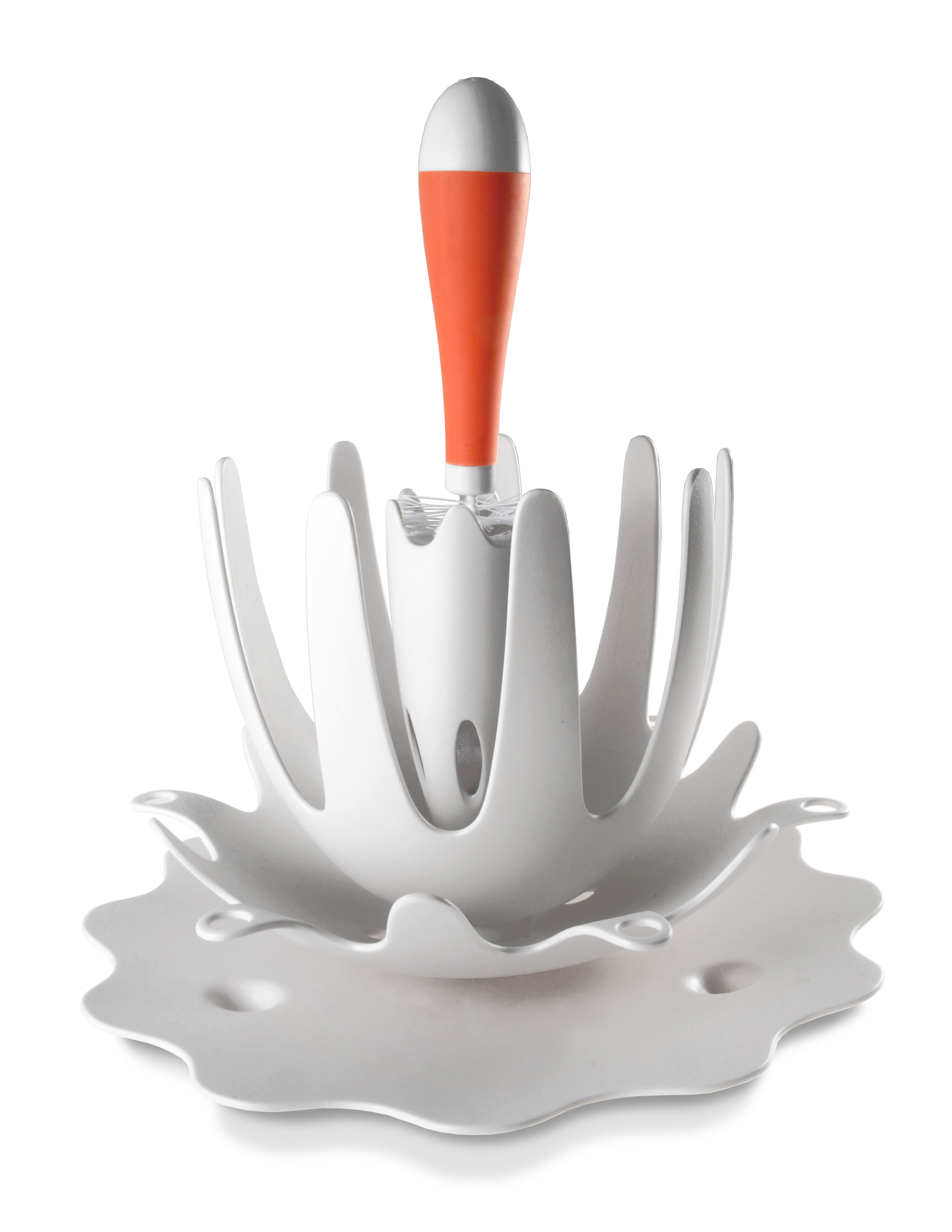
Splash Bottle, 2006

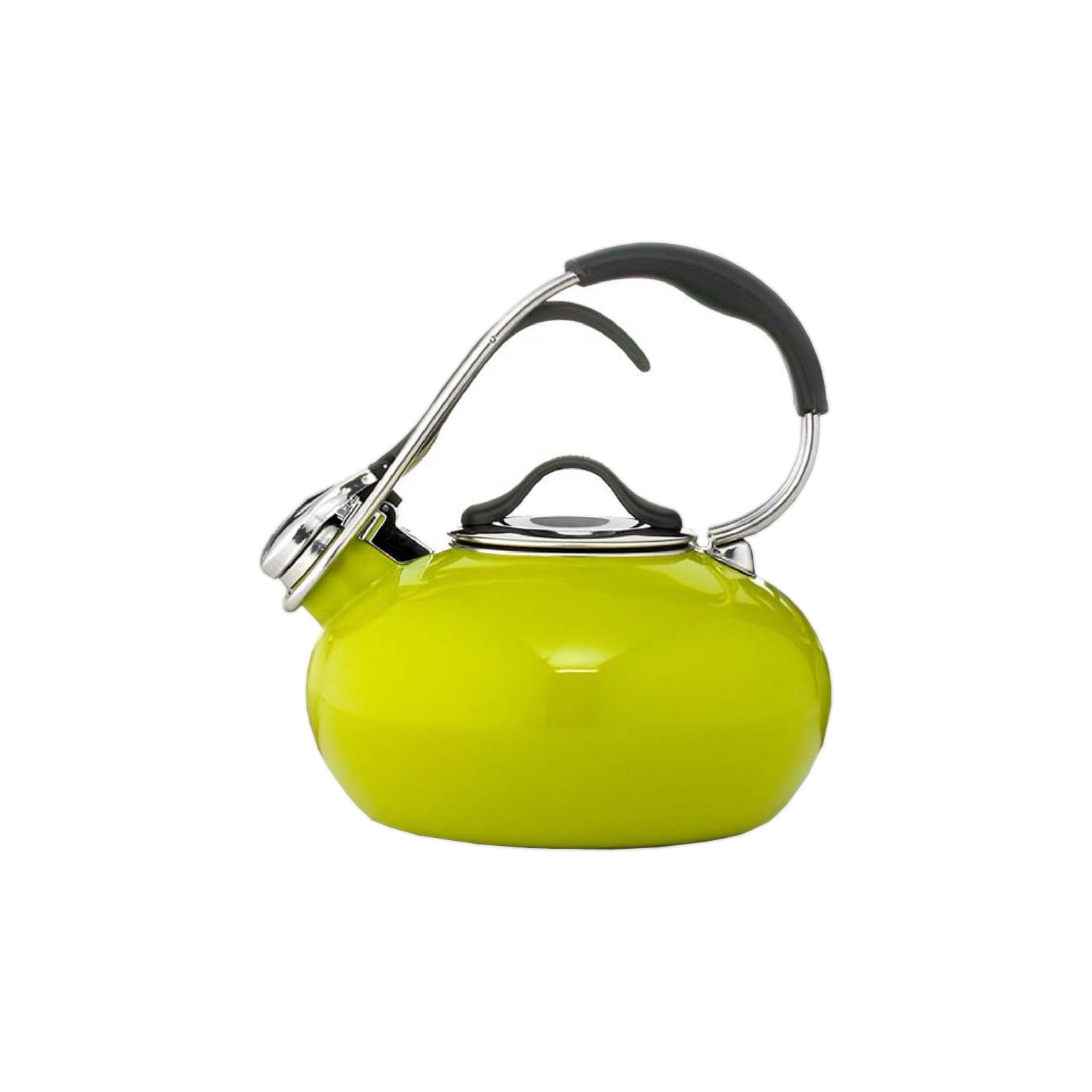
Loop Teakettle, 2008

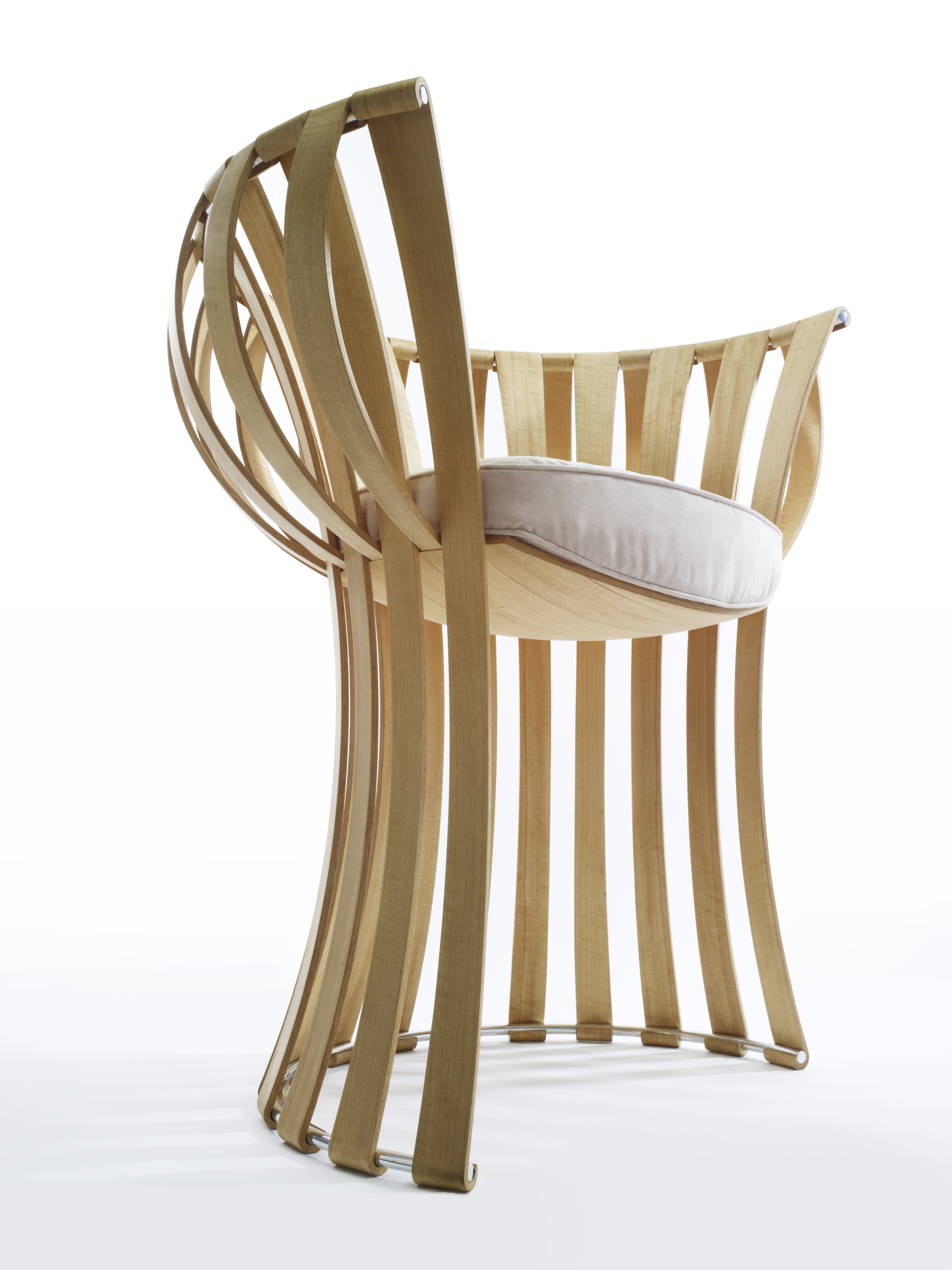
Slat Chair, 2011

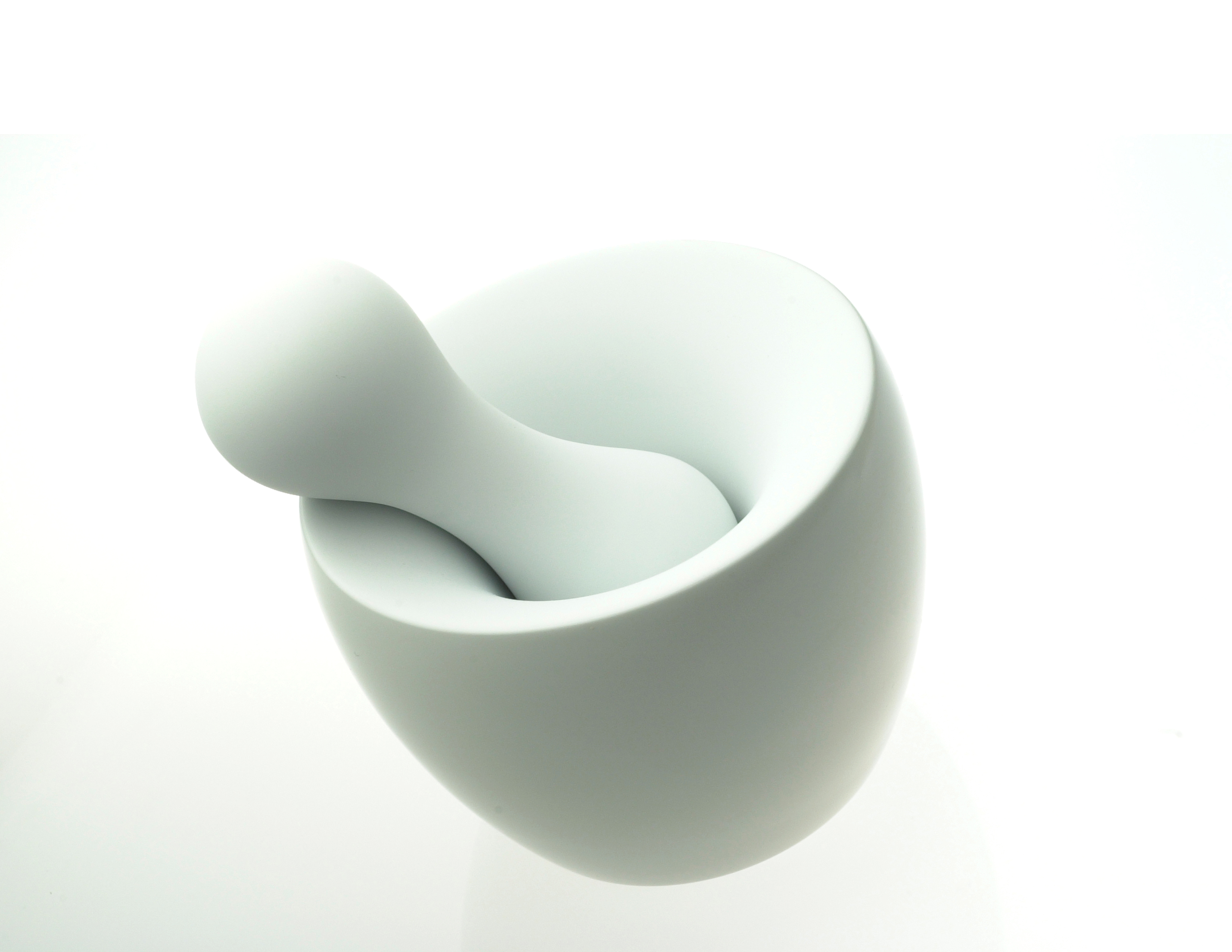
Spice Grinder, 2006

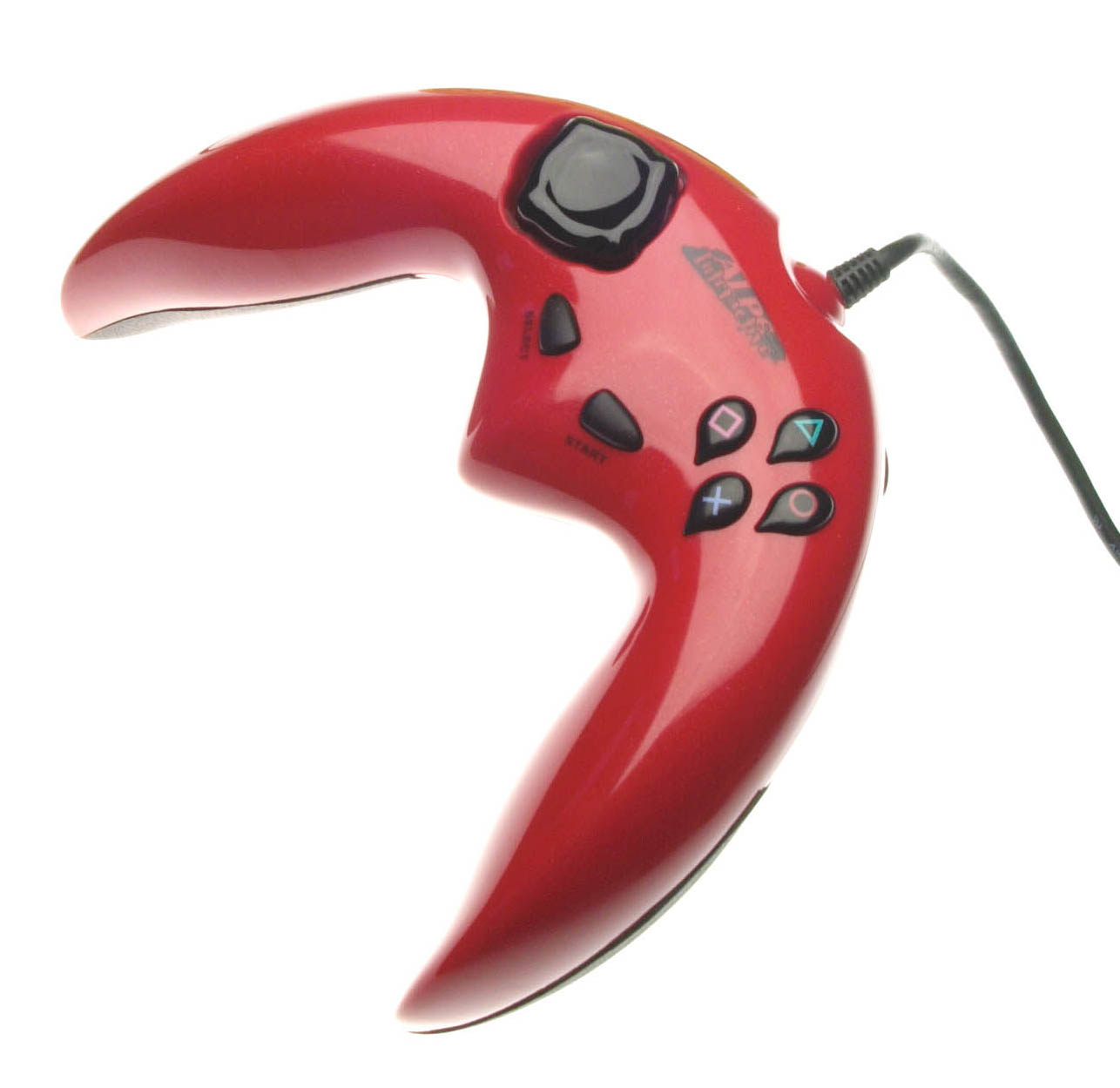
Alps Game Pad, 1996

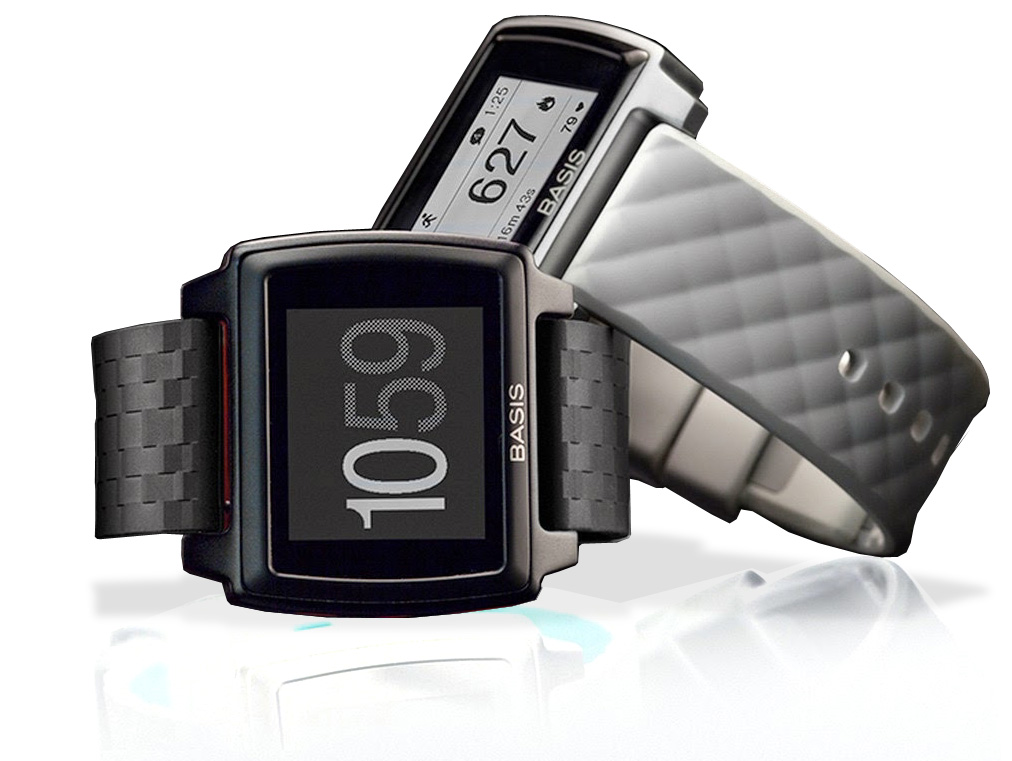
Basis Watches, 2014

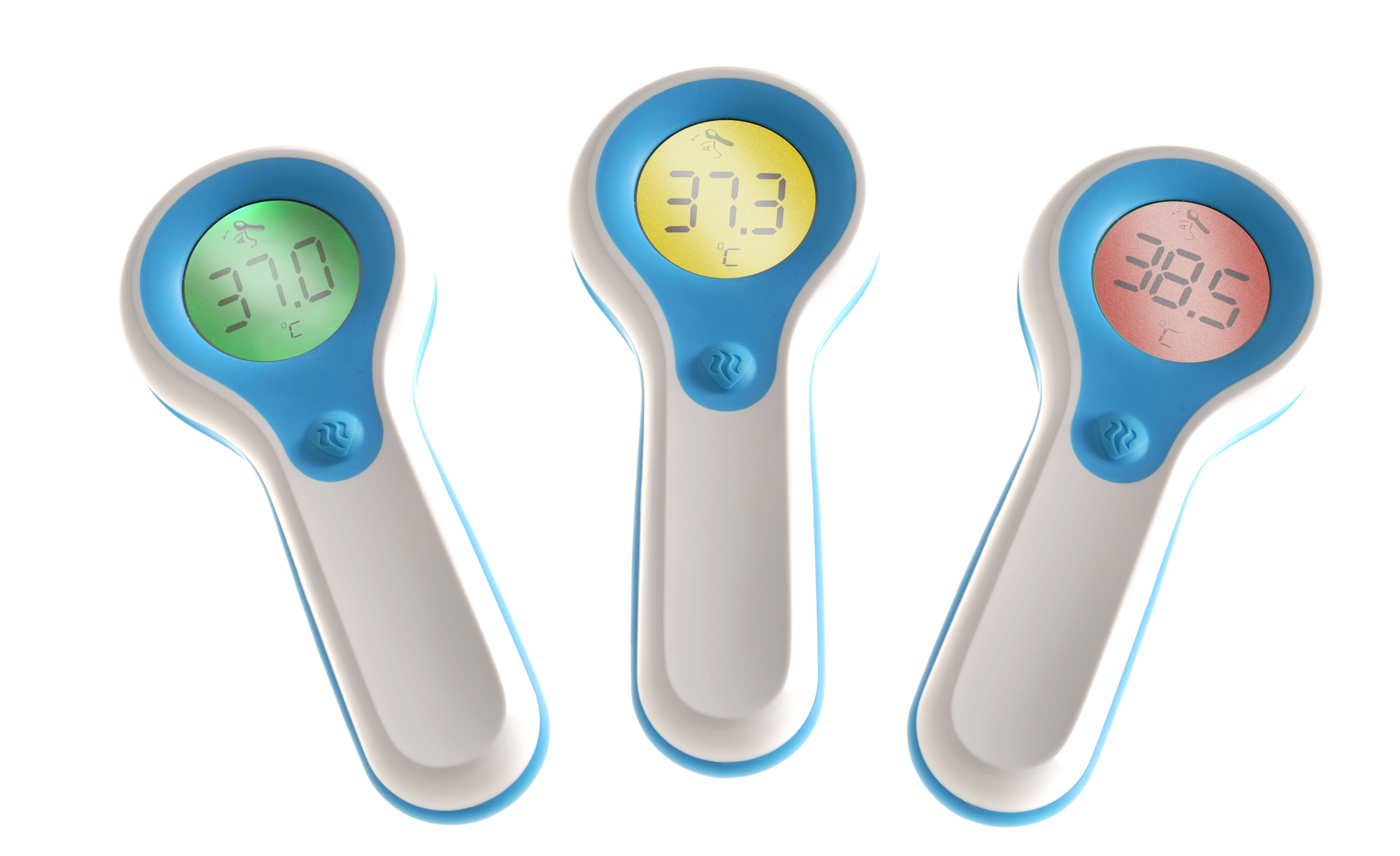
Thermometer, 2006

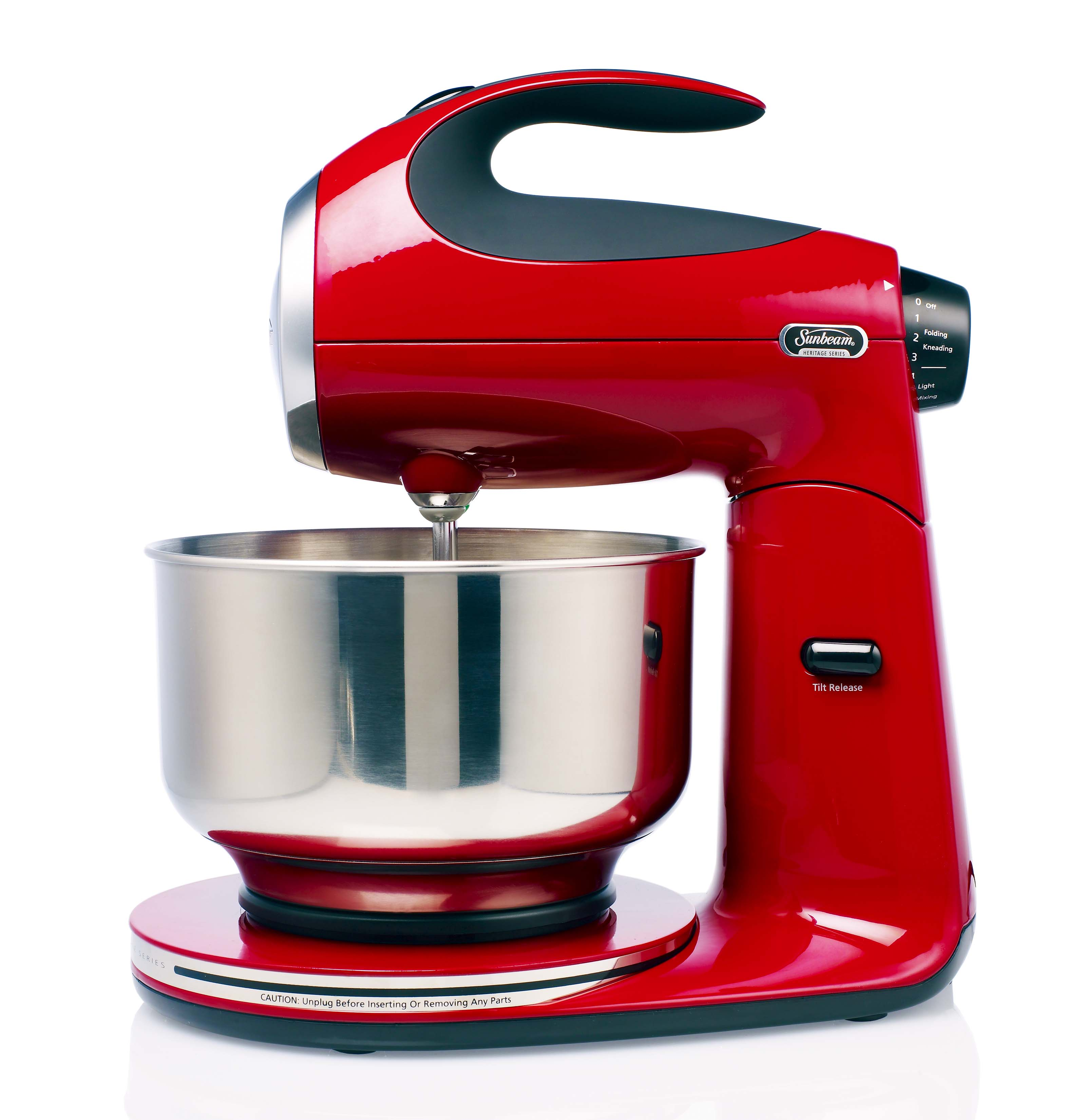
Stand Mixer, 2008

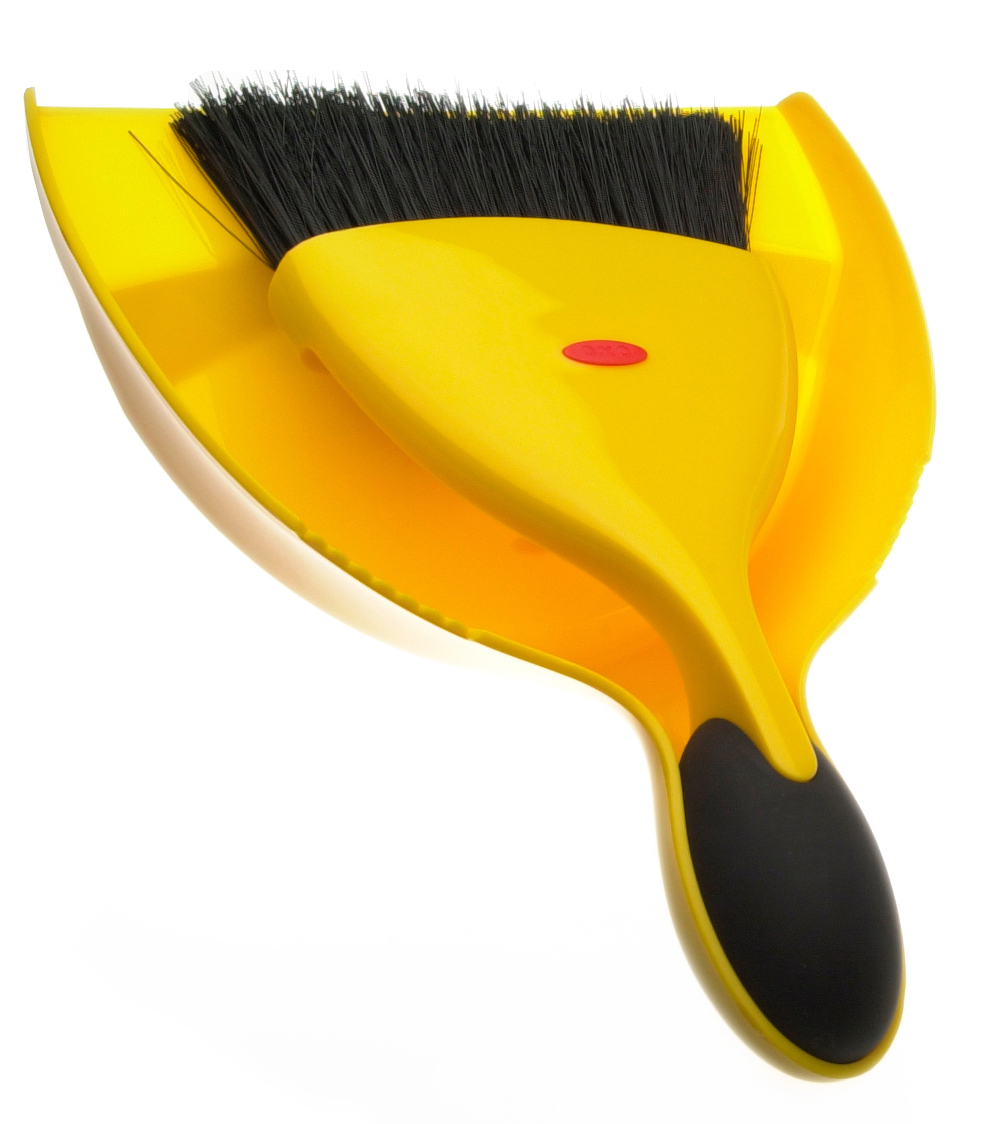
Dust Brush & Pan, 1997

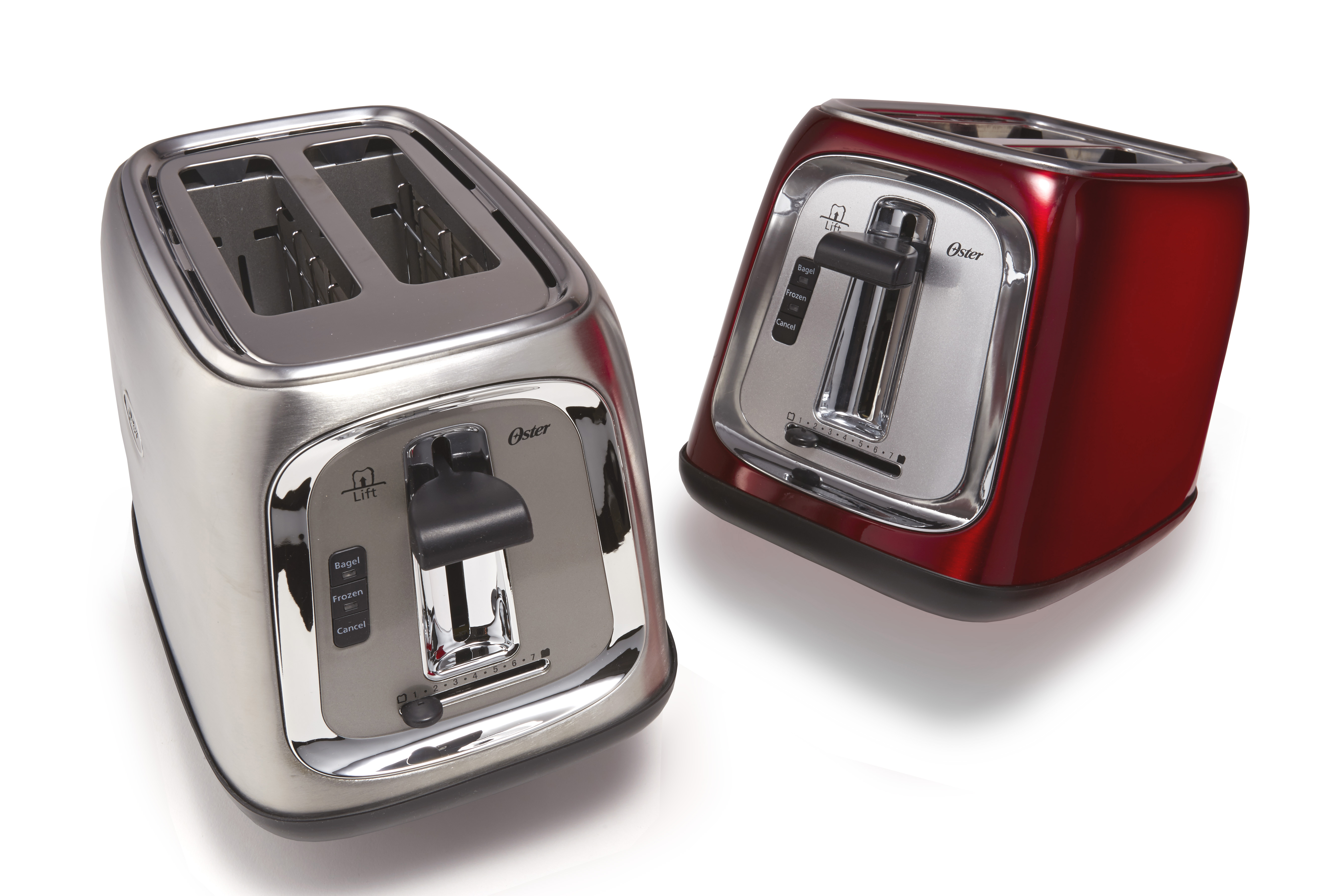
2-slice Toaster, 2016

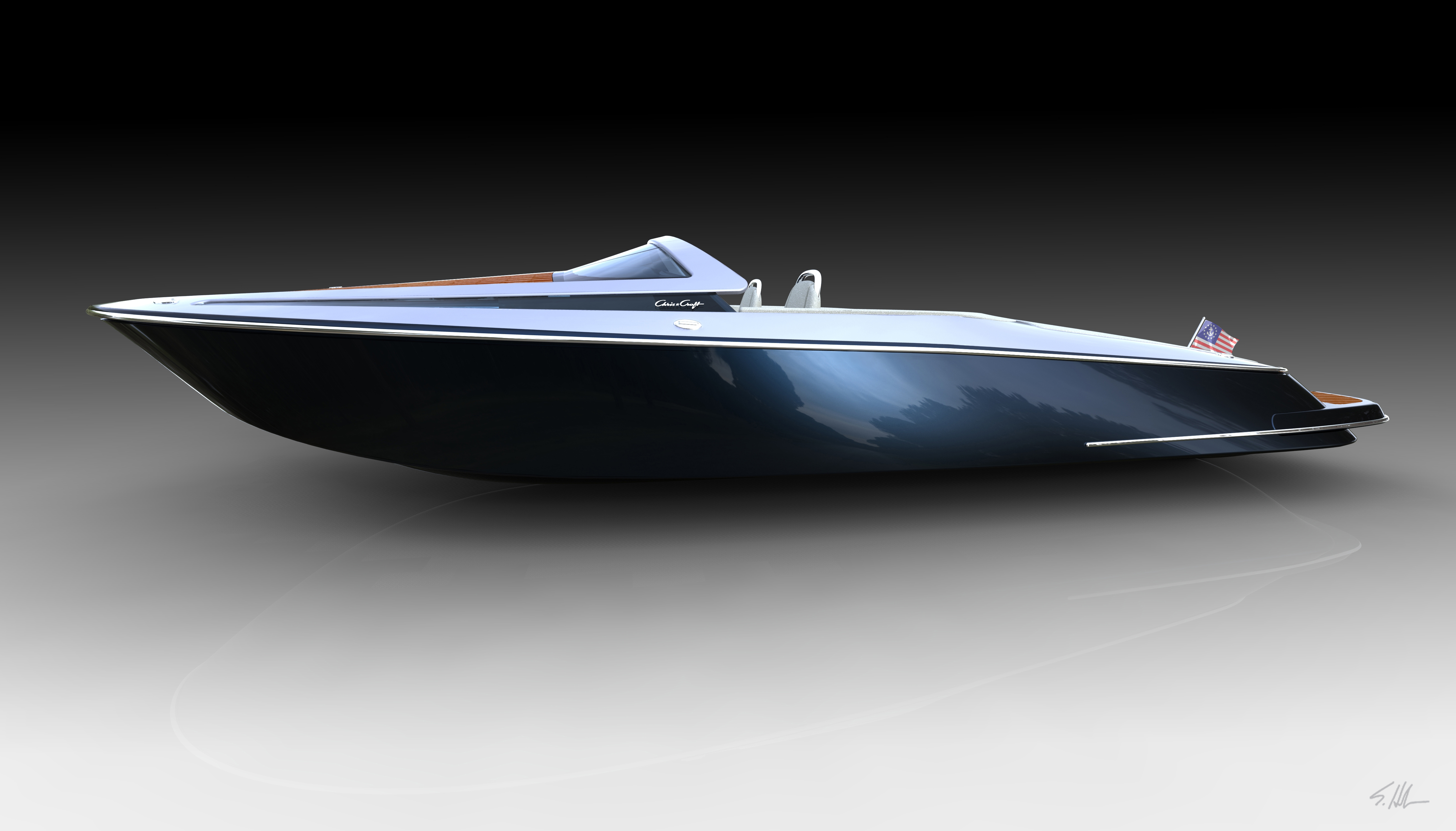
Concept Boat, 2013

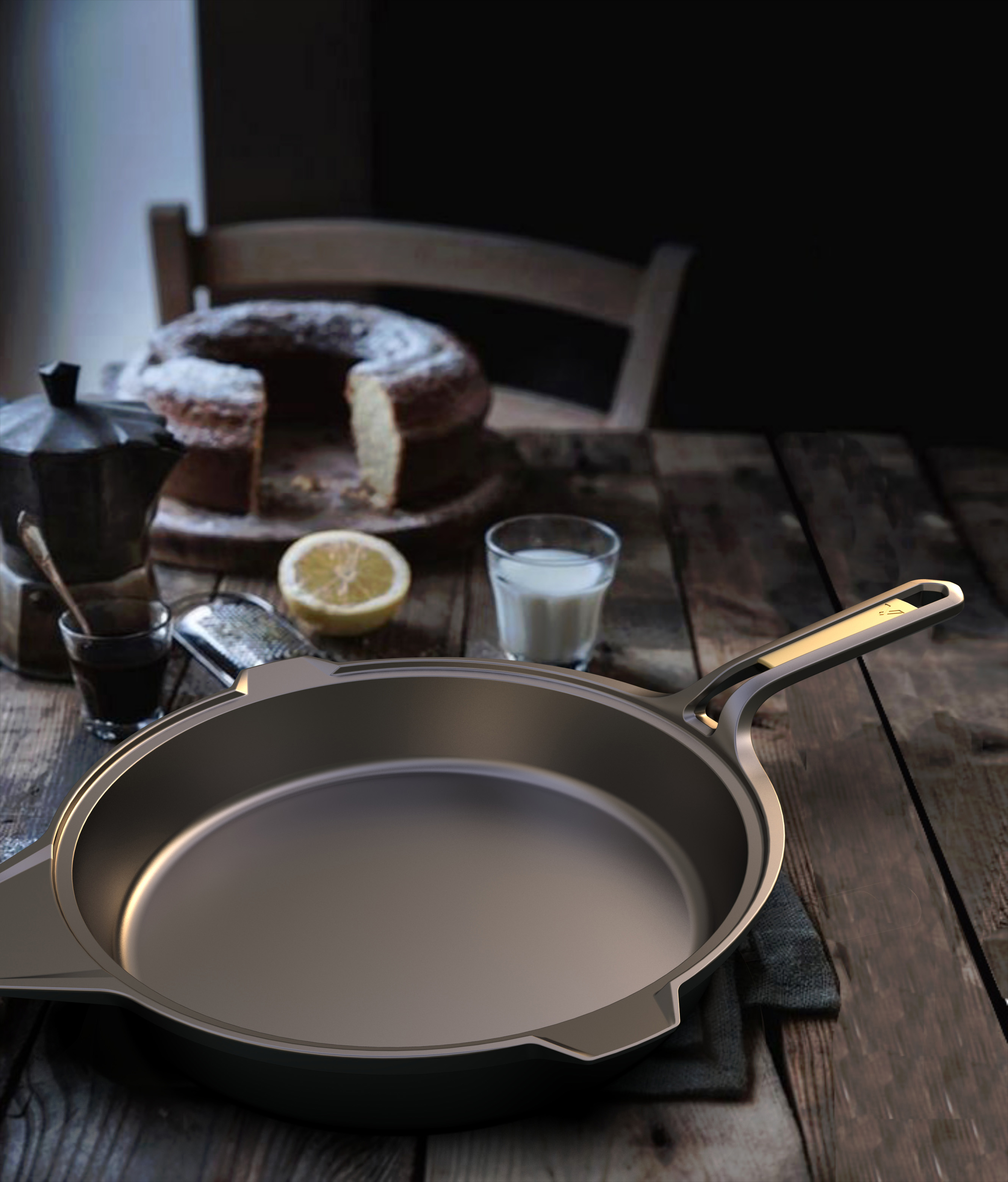
Skillet, 2023

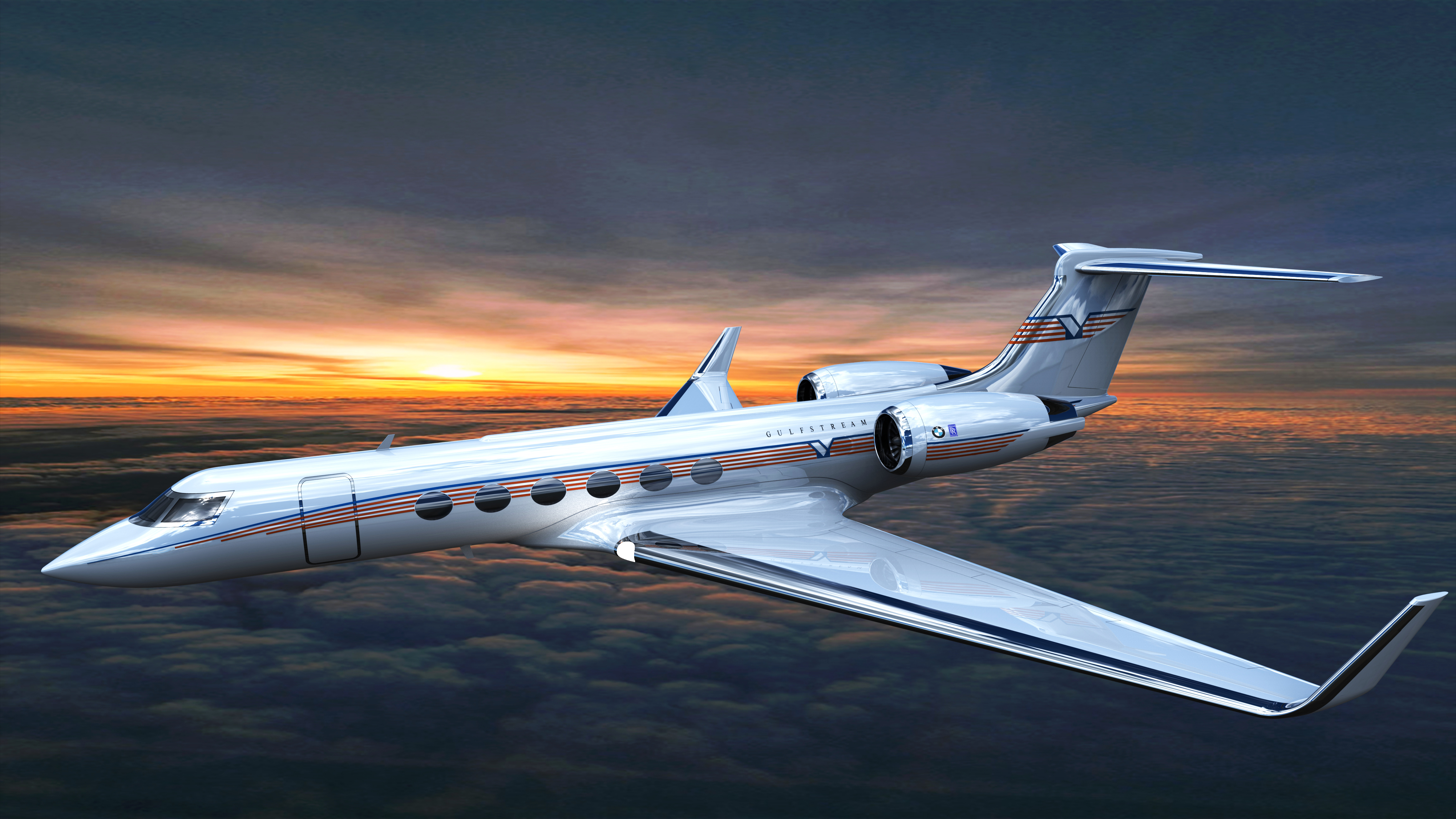
Jet, 1991

== Publications ==
- Sorokanich, Lara (30 September 2020) This radically reimagined face shield is a worker’s dream Fast Company
- Beall, Kelly (12 August 2022) F5: Scott Henderson Talks Powerful Graphic Images, Travel + More Design Milk
- Henderson, Scott (6 January 2023) Five design trends for 2023 Ambiente Blog
- Francis, Ali (15 August 2023) What Kitchen Appliances Will Look Like in 50 Years Bon Appetite
- Patton, Phil (10 December 2006) Simple Wood Toys, but So Much More New York Times
- Dunn, E. and Leigh, K. (20 September 2023) How Breville Became the Anti-Instant Pot Bloomberg
- Henderson, Scott (17 November 2012) Spotlight On: Scott Henderson Design Tory Burch
- Patton, Phil (15 October 2011) Octopus-vulgaris for WWF by designer Scott Henderson Design Applause
