= Design Museum Holon =

Museum in Israel

Coordinates: 32.0110°N 34.7778°E

- מוזיאון העיצוב חולון
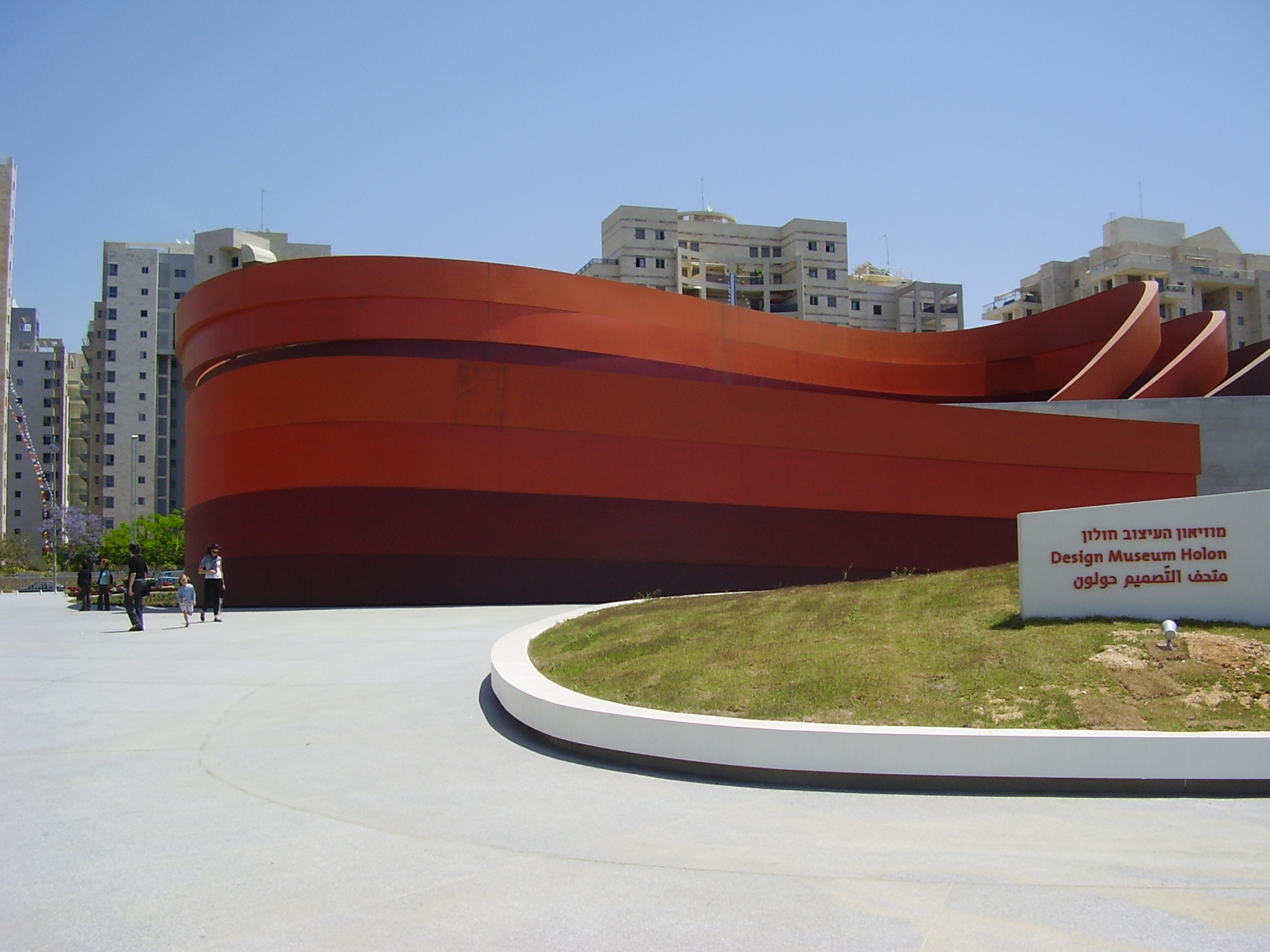
- Established: 2010
- Location: Holon, Israel
- Website: http://www.dmh.org.il/default.aspx

Design Museum Holon (Hebrew: מוזיאון העיצוב חולון) is the first museum in Israel dedicated to design.

== History ==
The building of the museum was planned and designed by Israeli architect and industrial designer Ron Arad in cooperation with Bruno Asa. The museum is in the eastern part of the new culture area of Holon that includes the Médiathèque (central library, theater, cinémathèque). Nearby is the faculty of design in the Holon Institute of Technology.

The museum opened on 3 March 2010. The museum was noted by travel magazine Conde Nast Traveler as one of the new world wonders.

== Collections and exhibitions ==
The museum collects and exhibits design artifacts in four categories: Historical Design, Contemporary Design, Commissioned Works, and Academic Projects.

Exhibitions have included curation around food-related design, the design of functional everyday objects, the role of emotion in design as well as shows dedicated to the work of international designers such as Alber Elbaz, Lea Gottlieb, Jaime Hayon, and Stephen Jones.

In 2015, and again in 2017, the museum produced an exhibit of designs created for Alessi that were never realized. These shows included the design work of Acconci Studio, Carlo and Giovanni Alessi, Andrea Branzi, Gary Chang, Scott Henderson, Hans Hollein, Toyo Ito, Marcel Wanders, and Zaha Hadid, among others.

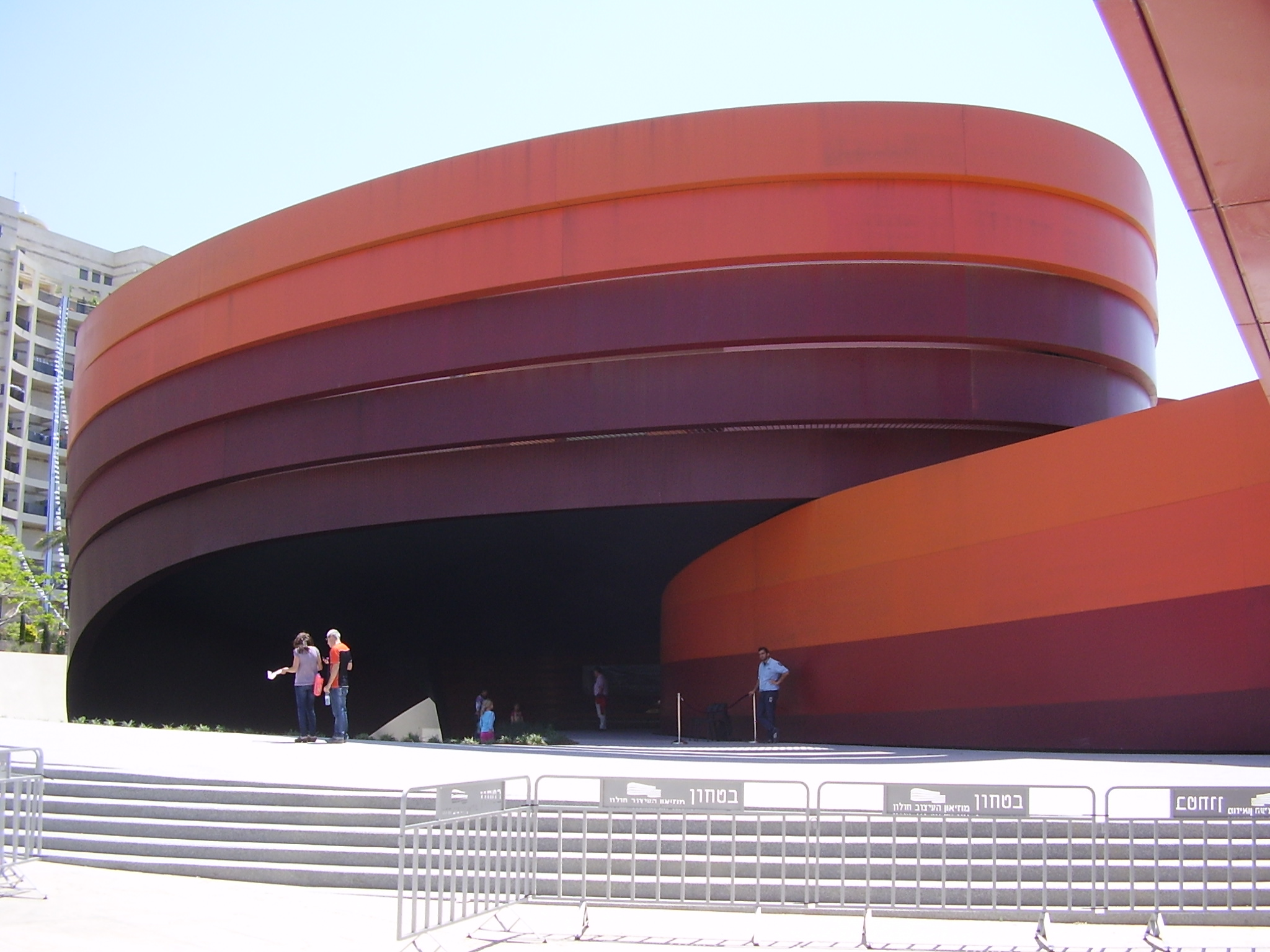

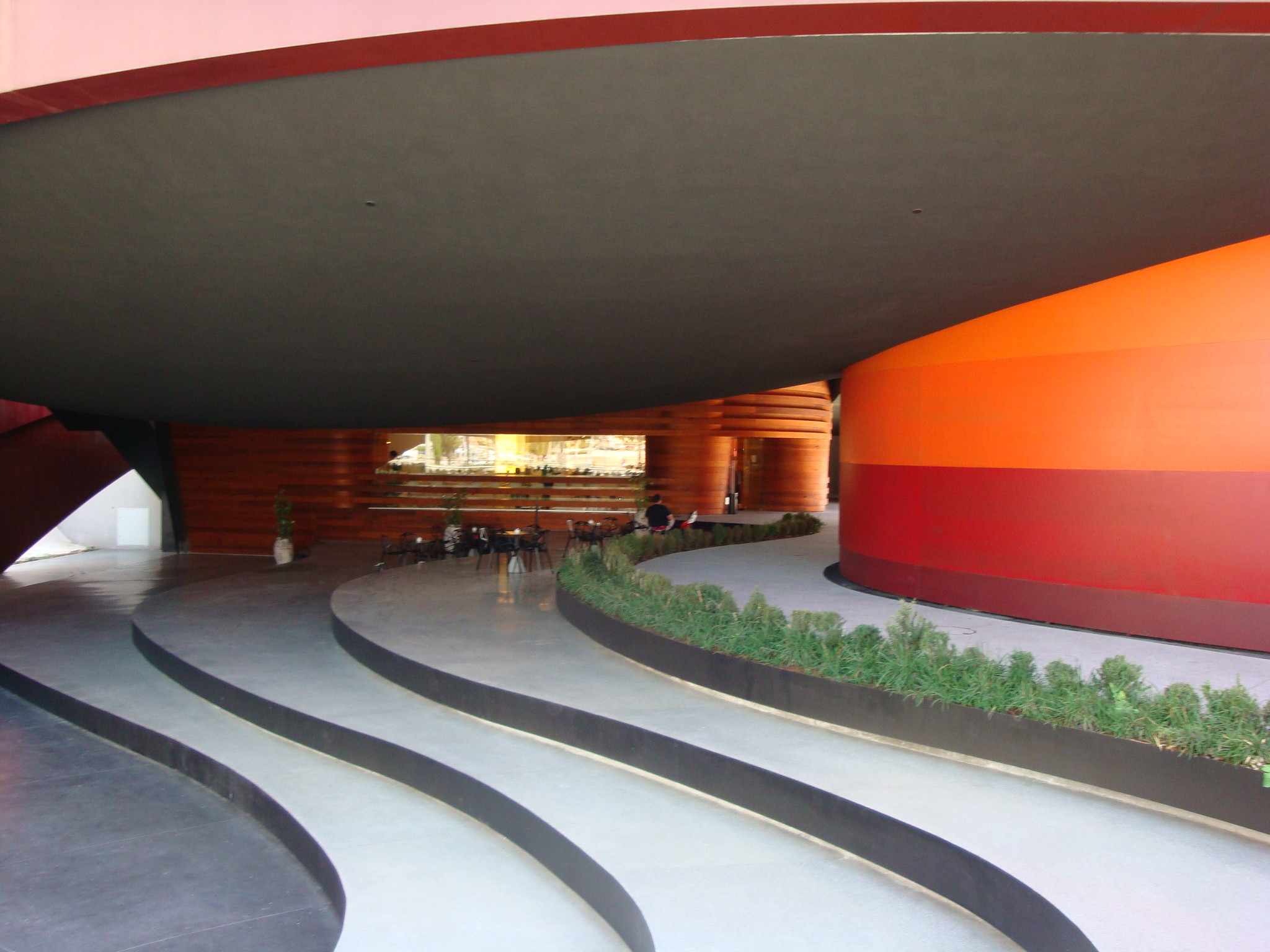

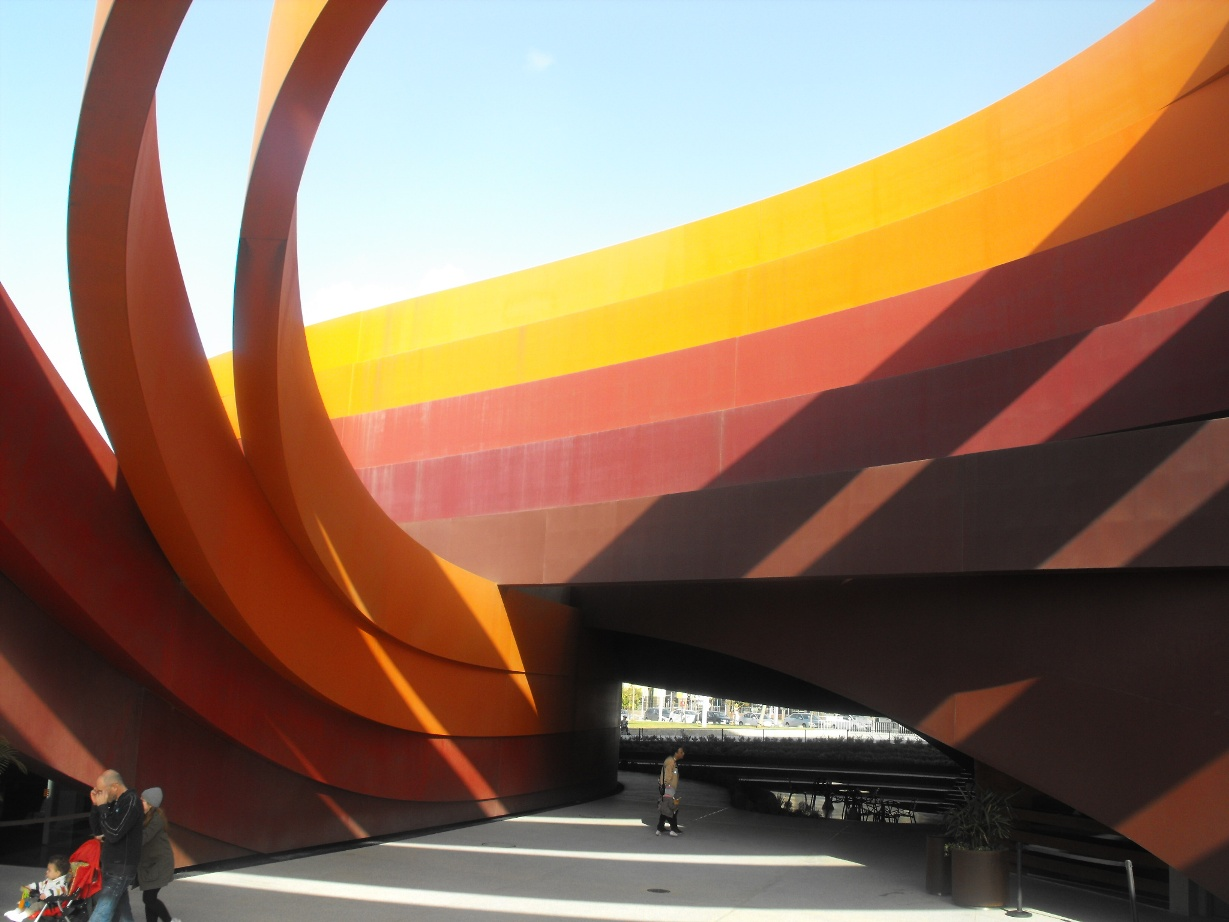

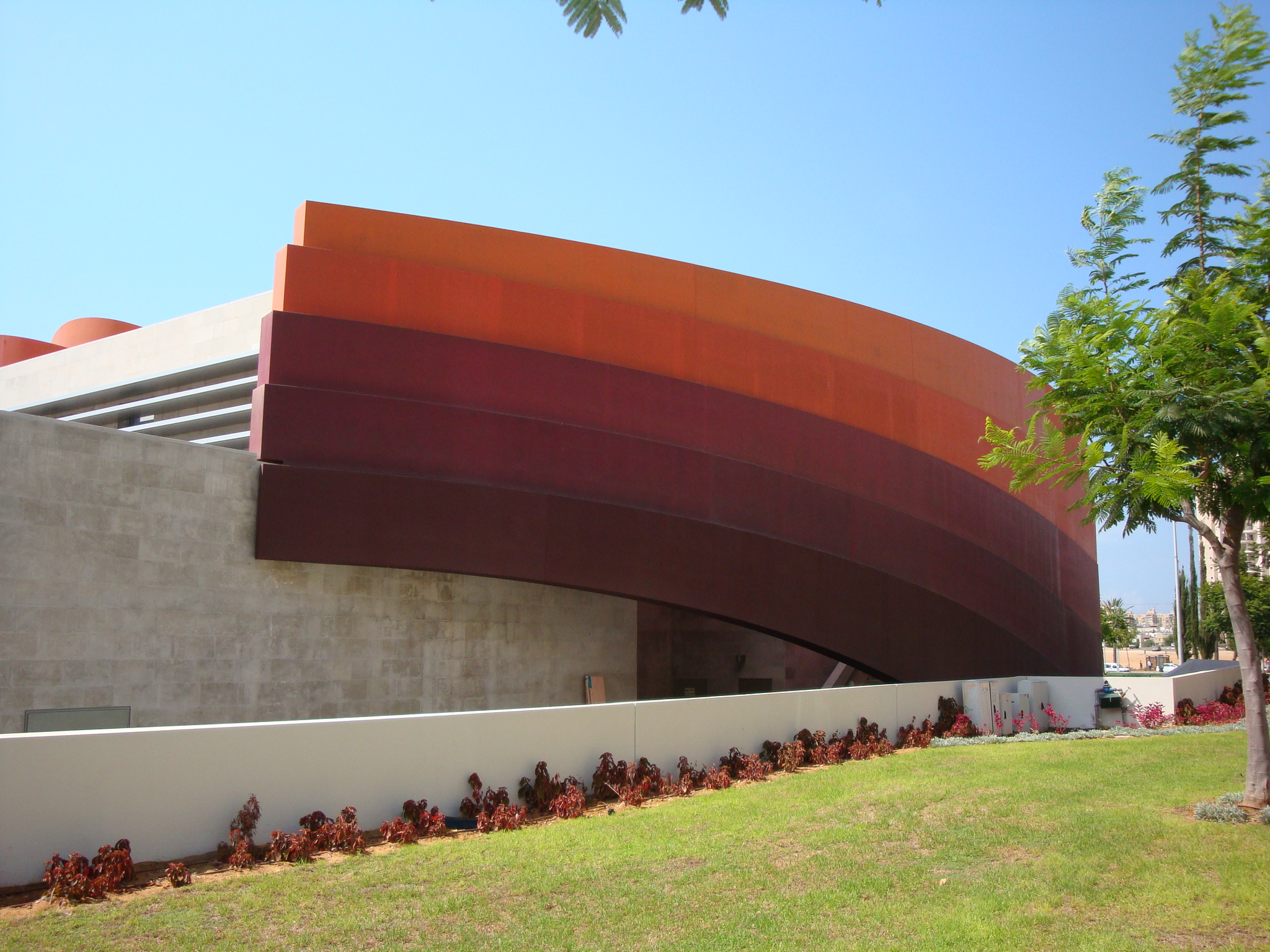

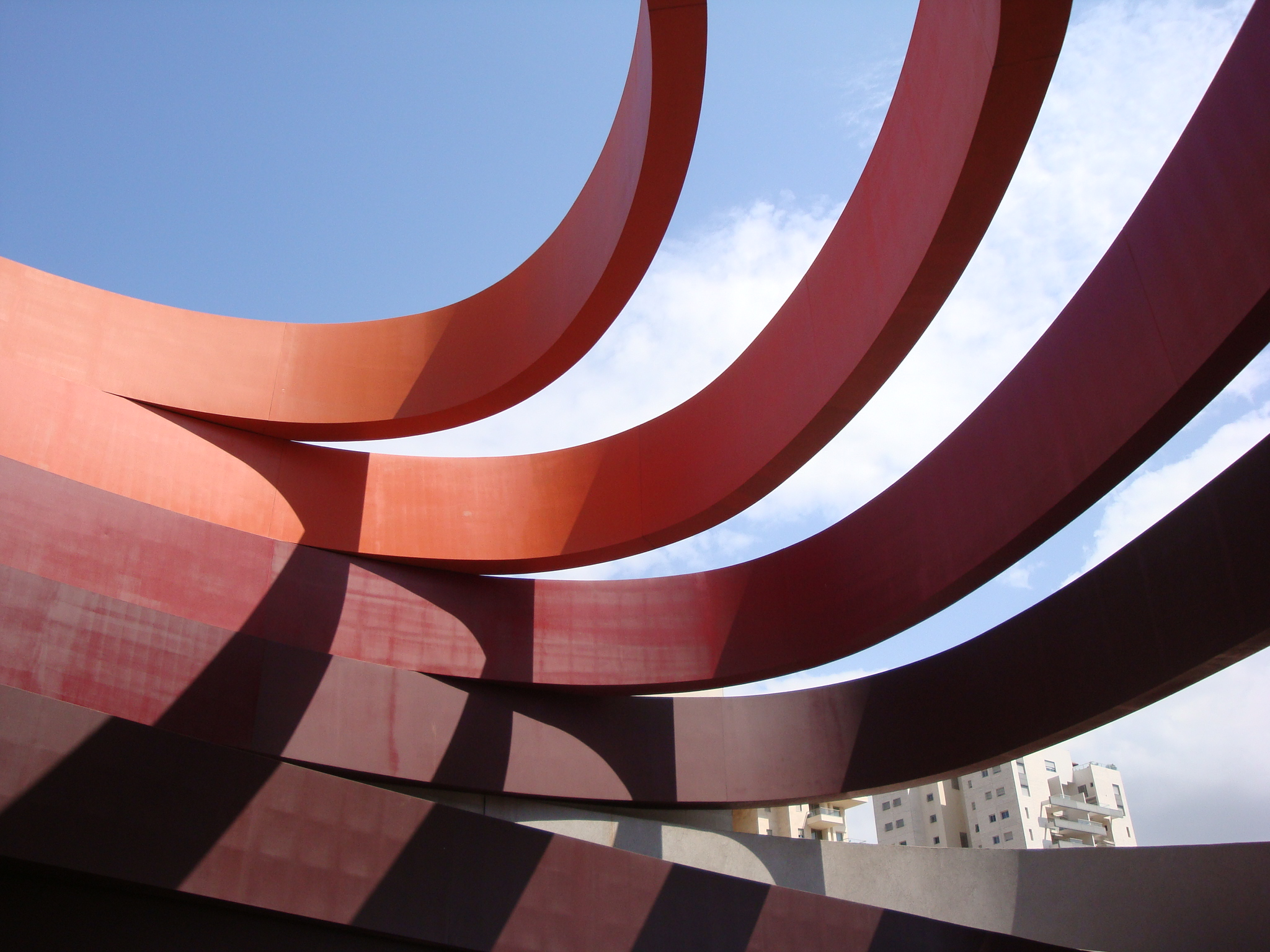

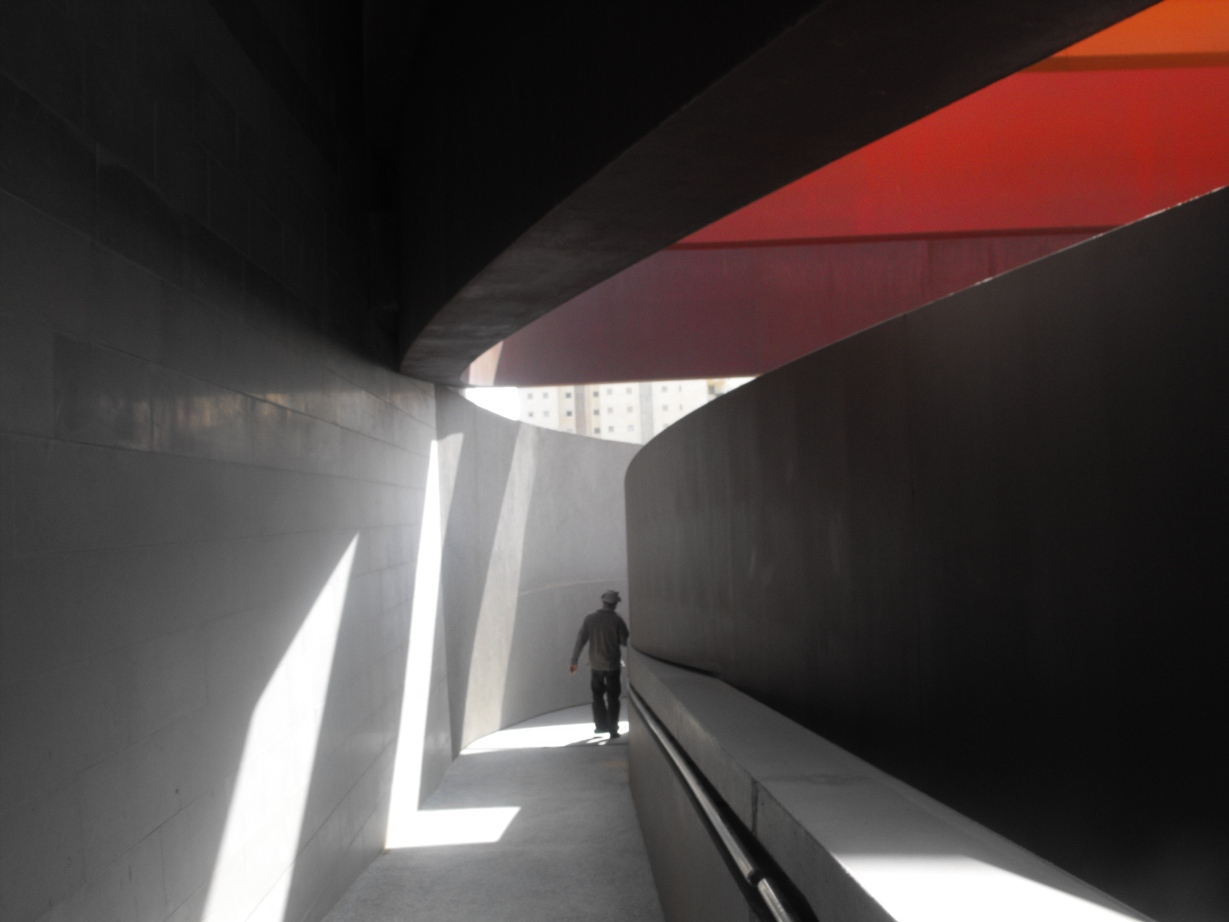

== See also ==
- List of design museums
- Visual arts in Israel
- Architecture of Israel
