= List of Illinois Institute of Technology alumni =

This list of Illinois Institute of Technology alumni includes graduates and non-graduate former students of Illinois Institute of Technology.

== Nobel laureates ==
Name	Image	Graduation date Degree	Known for	Reference
Jack Steinberger		Withdrew chemical engineering	Corecipient of the 1988 Nobel Prize in Physics "for the neutrino beam method and the demonstration of the doublet structure of the leptons through the discovery of the muon neutrino."	

== Politics and public service ==
Name	Image	Graduation date Degree	Known for	Reference
Valdas Adamkus		1961 civil engineering	Highly decorated President of the Republic of Lithuania, who served two terms, the first from 1998 to 2003 and again from 2004 to 2009.	
Rajeev Chandrasekhar		1985; Master's in computer science	Member of the Parliament of India; vice-president of FICCI; member of the architecture design teams that created the i486 and Pentium chips at Intel; director of Karnataka Power Corporation Limited; and director of HAL Bangalore International Airport.	
Julius Hoffman			Presiding judge in the Chicago Seven conspiracy trial.	
Munir Ahmad Khan		1956; Transferred	Chairman of the Pakistan Atomic Energy Commission (1972-1991) and IAEA Board of Governors (1986-1987)	
David V. Miller			Former U.S. Air Force Major General	
Joseph M. Mleziva			Wisconsin farmer and state legislator	
James G. Roche		1960; Bachelor of Science in language, literature and philosophy	Former Secretary of the Air Force, was Senior Professional Staff Member of the United States Senate Select Committee on Intelligence, asst. dir. of the Office of Net Assessment. Awards include the Order of the Sword, Decoration for Distinguished Civilian Service, Navy Distinguished Public Service Award, Navy Commendation Medal, Legion of Merit, and the Defense Superior Service Medal.	
Mohsen Sazegara		1979	Iranian journalist, political activist, and a researcher at Harvard University.	
Gloria Ray Karlmark		1965; Bachelor's degree in chemistry and mathematics	Congressional Gold Medal Recipient and one of the Little Rock Nine, a group of African-American students enrolled in Little Rock Central High School after the historic Brown v. Board of Education Supreme Court case.	

== Education ==
Name	Image	Graduation date Degree	Known for	Reference
Ethel Percy Andrus		1918; Bachelor of Science	Founded both the National Retired Teachers Association and the American Association of Retired Persons, both of which merged into what is now AARP.	
Ida M. Flynn		Master's degree in computer science	American computer scientist, textbook author, and professor. She founded the BSIS program at the University of Pittsburgh.	
Vincent Sarich		Bachelor of Science in chemistry	Controversial Professor of Anthropology who received 75 protesters during one of his lectures at University of California, Berkeley. His research includes work in sociobiology, evolutionary psychology, and the relation between race and evolutionary speciation.	
Martin C. Jischke		1963; Bachelor of Science in physics	President of Purdue University; President of Iowa State University; and Chancellor of Missouri University of Science and Technology. He is also a member of the United States President's Council of Advisors on Science and Technology.	

== Business ==
Name	Image	Graduation date Degree	Known for	Reference
John Calamos		1963; Bachelor's Degree in Business and Economics; 1970 M.B.A.	Listed on Forbes' 400 Richest Americans list as #281. Founder and CEO of Calamos Asset Management. Conferred as one of BusinessWeek's Best Mutual Fund Managers in both 2003 and 2004.	
Katie Booth		Industrial Chemistry	Known as a biomedical chemist and civil rights activist	
Robert Pritzker		1946; Bachelor's Degree in Industrial Engineering	Listed as #47 in 2004 on Forbes' ranking of the wealthiest people in the world. Inherited Colson Company, and industrial component manufacturer, and merged it with others into Marmon Group and member from the Pritzker family.	
Sanjay Kirloskar			Chairman and Managing Director of the Kirloskar Brothers Limited, one of the world's largest pump manufacturers. As of 2006, he is worth 1.5 billion USD.	
Sam Pitroda		1966; Master's in Electrical Engineering	Chairman of the National Knowledge Commission to the Prime Minister of India. Chairman and CEO of World-Tel Limited, a member of the ITU. Set up 1.52 million ubiquitous yellow public call offices throughout India, revolutionizing telephone access in the country.	
Tony Rezko		1970's Bachelor's degree and master's degree in civil engineering	Political fundraiser, restaurateur, and real estate developer who helped Rod Blagojevich become Governor of Illinois and set up the state's first Democratic administration in twenty years. Rezko was convicted on several counts of fraud and bribery in 2008 for using his connections to the state boards to demand kickbacks from businesses that wanted to do business with the state.	

== Engineering ==
Name	Image	Graduation date Degree	Known for	Reference
Arthur Bronwell		1933	Electrical engineering professor who served as president of Worcester Polytechnic Institute and dean of the University of Connecticut School of Engineering. Bronwell received his BS degree in 1933 and went on to receive his MS degree from IIT.	
Marvin Camras		1940	Invented a way to produce high fidelity magnetic wire recordings which were used for training and misinforming the enemy during WWII. His inventions contributed to commercializing magnetic tape sound recording. Received the National Medal of Technology "for the development and commercialization of magnetic recording."	
Otis Boykin		Withdrew	Most notable invention was likely the control unit for the artificial heart pacemaker, which used electrical impulses to maintain a regular heartbeat. He also contributed more than 25 other military and commercial electronic devices.	
Martin Cooper		1950	Inventor of the mobile phone while working at Motorola. His first call on "the brick" was to his rival at Bell Labs, Joel S. Engel. He is a former CEO, co-founder, and current Chairman of ArrayComm.	
Lina Nilsson			Co-founder of Tekla Labs and open source lab technology developer. MIT Technology Review 35 Under 35.	
Bhakta B. Rath		1961	Material physicist and Head of the Materials Science and Component Technology of the United States Naval Research Laboratory	
Grote Reber		1933; Electrical engineering	Early experimenter with radio telescopes and built the first with a parabolic reflector.	

== Computer science ==
Name	Image	Graduation date Degree	Known for	Reference
Jack Dongarra		1973; Master of Science in computer science	Distinguished Professor of Computer Science, University of Tennessee	
Edward L. Kaplan		1965	Co-founder of Zebra Technologies and served as chairman and CEO of the company for 37 years. The company manufactures Real time location systems, RFID solutions, and specialty printers for industrial product tracking.	
Victor Tsao		1980	Co-founded Linksys together with his wife Janie Tsao. Linksys Group, Inc. was the market and product leader in the Consumer/SOHO networking market. Linksys’ products include wireless/wired home routers and access points, wireless adapters for laptops and desktops and unmanaged switches. In 2003 the company was acquired by Cisco Systems for $500 million.	

== Natural sciences ==
Name	Image	Graduation date Degree	Known for	Reference
Sidney Coleman		1957; Physics	Creator of the eponymous Coleman–Mandula theorem	
Susan Solomon		1977; Bachelor of Science in chemistry	A senior scientist at the National Oceanic and Atmospheric Administration, she was the first person to explain that manmade chlorofluorocarbons were destroying the ozone layer and was elected to the National Academy of Sciences in 1992 at age 36. She was named one of Time Magazine's Top 100 Most Influential People in 2008.	
Samuel Karlin			Mathematician and population geneticist.	

== Humanities ==
=== Architecture and design ===
Name	Image	Graduation date Degree	Known for	Reference
Virgil Abloh		2006 M.Arch	Fashion designer for brands Louis Vuitton and Off-White	
Henry Clifford Boles		1943 B.Arch	African American Architect, active in Massachusetts and Liberia	
Charles Draper Faulkner		1913; Bachelor of Science in Architecture	Chicago-based architect	
Charles M. Goodman FAIA		1934	Hollin Hills Historic District and other notable mid-century modern homes	
Helmut Jahn		withdrew	Architect (Sony Center on the Potsdamer Platz, Berlin; Messeturm in Frankfurt; James R. Thompson Center in Chicago)	
James Ingo Freed		Degree in Architecture	Architect	
Hans Hollein		1959 withdrew	Pritzker Prize-winning Austrian architect (attended IIT for one year)	
Gertrude Kerbis		1954	Founded the firm Lempp Kerbis in 1967; Founded the Chicago Women in Architecture group	
Florence Knoll		1941	Building Knoll Inc, modernist office and furniture design.	
Phyllis Lambert CC GOQ FRAIC FRSC RCA		1963	Canadian architect	
Howard Lane		1947	Architect based in Los Angeles, California	
Edward Noonan		1960	Architect and Shimer College president	
Brigitte Peterhans		1962	Architect and associate partner at Skidmore Owings and Merrill	
Robert Bruce Tague		1935; Master's Degree in Architecture	Chicago-based architect and abstract artist	,

=== Arts and entertainment ===
Marvin E. Newman
Name	Image	Graduation date Degree	Known for	Reference
Michael Abramson		1977	Documentary photographer	
Barbara Blondeau		MFA, 1968	Experimental Photographer	
Dorothea Brande			Writer and associate editor of The American Review	
Linda Connor			Large-format photographer; professor of photography	
Anita Douthat		1972	Photographer	
Yasuhiro Ishimoto		1952	Photographer	
Kenneth Josephson			Large-format photographer; professor of photography	
Harry Stephen Keeler		Electrical Engineering	Novelist	
Ray Metzker			Large-format photographer; professor of photography	
Art Paul		1950	Graphic designer, Playboy Art Director and designer of its rabbit-head logo	
Art Sinsabaugh			Large-format photographer; professor of photography	
Dorothy Thompson			Writer, broadcaster, wife of Sinclair Lewis	
Charles H. Traub			Photographer and educator	
James Young		Bachelor's degree in mechanical and aerospace engineering	Member of the band Styx	
Nandamuri Kalyan Ram		MS	Indian Film Actor	

=== Social and behavioral sciences ===
Name	Image	Graduation date Degree	Known for	Reference
Irving I. Gottesman		1953; Bachelor of Science degree in Psychology	Distinguished Professor at University of Minnesota in psychology	
