= Barbara Blondeau =

American photographer (1938–1974)

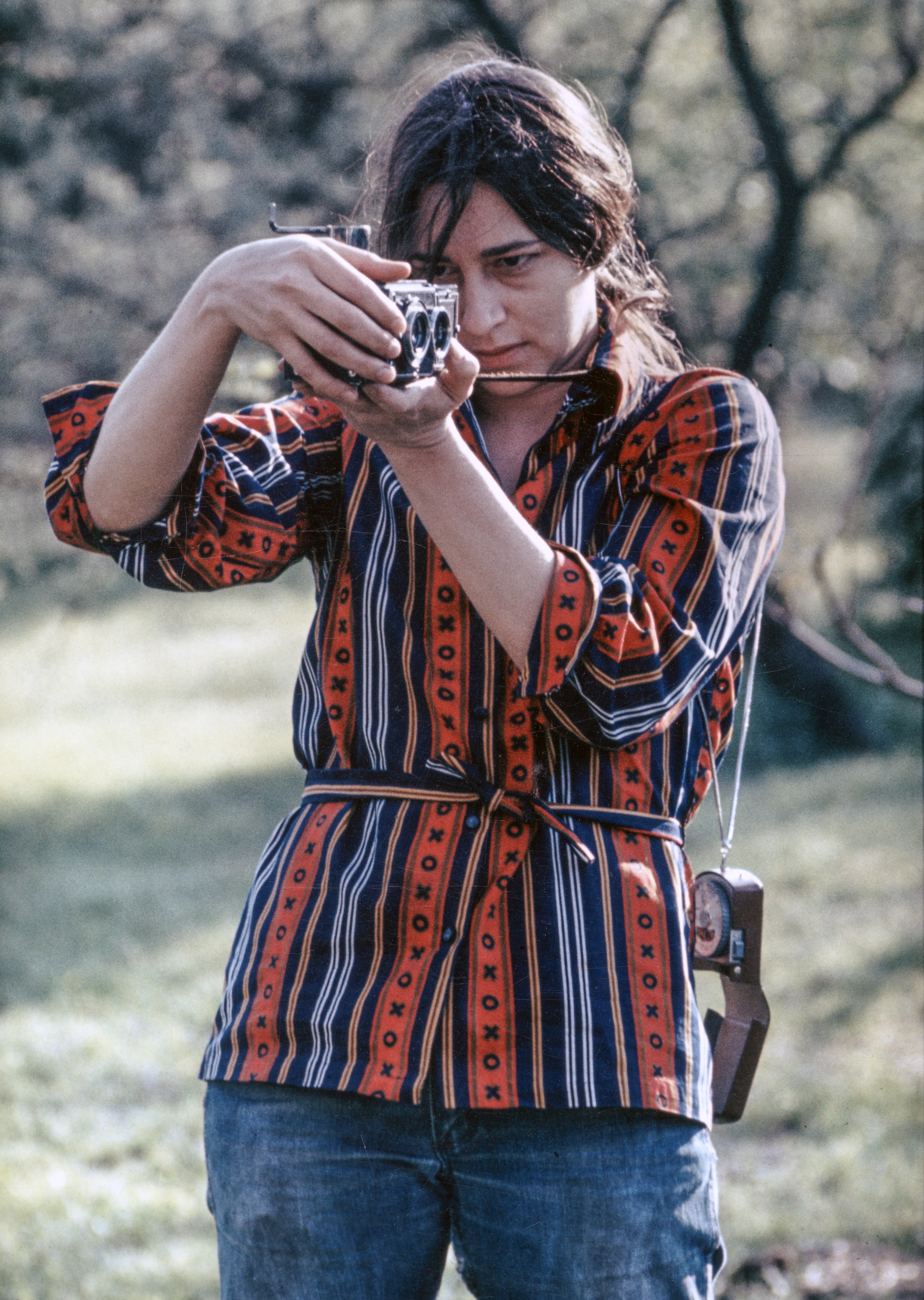
- Born: May 6, 1938; Detroit, Michigan, U.S.
- Died: December 24, 1974 (aged 36); Philadelphia, Pennsylvania, U.S.
- Occupation: Photographer

Barbara Blondeau (May 6, 1938 – December 24, 1974) was an American experimental photographer active in the mid-1960s through the early 1970s. In her career as a photographer, she worked in a wide variety of materials, process and formats, although she is best known for her strip prints which she stumbled upon while shooting with a malfunctioning camera.

== Early life and education ==
Blondeau was born in Detroit, Michigan, on May 6, 1938. Originally, Blondeau studied to be a painter at the School of the Art Institute of Chicago. She later on received her Bachelor of Fine Arts degree at the School of the Art Institute of Chicago in 1961. Aaron Siskind and Joseph Jachna gave direction to Blondeau, when she was studying at the Institute of Design at the Illinois Institute of Technology during a time where many of the photographers present were working in the style of formalism. Blondeau received her Master's of Fine Arts (MFA) at the Institute of Design at the Illinois Institute of Technology in 1968. While working on her MFA, Blondeau also taught at the Institute of Design. During her graduate school days, Blondeau, experimented with concepts such as transparency, repetition, patterning and narrative in her work.

Barbara Blondeau became a teacher at St. Mary's College Notre Dame, in Indiana starting in 1966. While teaching there she was working towards her master's degree from the Institute of Design. She later left in 1968 after receiving her master's degree. From there she moved to Philadelphia and started teaching at Moore College of Art in Philadelphia, Pennsylvania. In 1970 she became an assistant professor at the Philadelphia College of the Arts. During her career at the PCA she became the chairman of the department of photography and film. Her career as a professor ended when her illness prevented her from performing everyday activities.

== Photography ==
It was a broken camera that caused Blondeau to stumble upon what would become her best-known work. While she was shooting the shutter to her camera stuck open as she wound the film. The abstract imagery and multiple overlapping exposures that resulted intrigued Blondeau, and she began to create these images purposefully. She experimented with strobe lights, different winding speeds and masking techniques. The resulting rolls were printed as one long image, a new take on the panorama format. Blondeau often worked with a dance company as her subjects for her strip prints. Their graceful movements left ghostly traces behind which Blondeau found desirable. She also experimented with different lighting to accompany the model.

Although Barbara Blondeau's photographic career was short, spanning less than ten years, it was productive. She experimented with color printing, multiple exposure, orthochromatic film, and contact printing. She was interested in exploring the natural world and reassembling the information into an artificial reality. In her color work, she never used natural colors and in many prints magenta seemed to be a prominent color. The human figure is also a main character in her work and Blondeau strived to abstract it in many different ways.

In her street photography Blondeau would often use orthochromatic film to make prints, this type of film is clear and yields a high contrast. Subtle gray tones and details are lost. This effect provides the viewer with a stark, concentrated reality. Any information gained from the image must be read solely from the highlights and shadows.

Although Blondeau only had two solo exhibitions during her short career, she was a part twenty-five group shows, eleven after her death. Time-Life Books highlighted her pictures in two of their publications, Frontiers of Photography and The Print. Her work was also published in the magazines Camera, Popular Photography Annual, After Image and Camera Arts. She was a part of the group exhibitions Vision and Expression and The Multiple Image, which both resulted in exhibition Catalogues.

=== Early work ===
Blondeau's photography consistently incorporated patterning, especially in her earlier work. The layout of the patterning was not any specific predetermined structure, but rather the overall form made by the units of the pattern by using objects such as twigs, leaves, and shadows. Oftentimes, Blondeau would establish a central "character" to interrupt the overall pattern being formed by the other units, such as a larger branch compared to pattern created by smaller twigs. In her early work from Chicago, Blondeau was mainly focused on trying out formal solution to her pictorial problems, whereas in her later work she began experimenting with new techniques.

=== Exploratory techniques ===
While working at St. Mary's College in Notre Dame and working towards her master's degree from the Institute of Design, she experimented with different picture making techniques and developed the ideas that she had first presented in her Chicago photographs. Some examples include her patterned segmented prints and her Cliché Verre prints. Cliche Verre prints, the images were produced by printing large sheets of glass with oil paints, and then contact printing these negatives onto black and white photo paper.

Victim, Cliche Verre Print (one of the only times Blondeau gave one of her prints a name) depicted displays a profile of a skeleton using this technique. These images presented a profile view of the head of an extremely emaciated figure. Expressive elements of the figure presented in the print, combined with the title, are given as much importance as the technical exploration. The issue of transparency became relevant in her work and she explored it in numerous ways. In 1966–1967, she produced a few small color prints where she exposed different negatives of the same scene through different filters onto single sheets of color printing paper. The degree of overlap of the three images produced color shapes with only slight similarities to the original image that she had photographed. In 1967, Blondeau began to explore further ways to use transparency in her images while maintaining the technical exploration of overprinting and negative printing, in a series of two images. In the first series, desolate urban scenes were printed in negative tones. These images included close ups of telephone wires, parking lots, old warehouses being watched over by a ghostly female face. In the second series, the photographs tended to be more self-referential. Images included waving grass, a decrepit pickup truck within the silhouette of a backlit female figure.

=== Strip prints ===
In 1968, Blondeau began producing the long strip-prints, which she worked with most persistently and gained recognition for. For the first pictures she made with this technique, she placed the camera in front of a person posed against a black background, and then wound the roll of 120-size film through, varying the speed at which the turned the film advance. She then printed each roll as one printed. The results were prints in which a white form of greater or lesser transparency, depending on the speed at which she had wound the film, and the exposure provided to the image at the moment of capture. In her first strip prints, the actions of the characters seem designed more to produce a challenging visual appearance than to suggest a dramatic meaning . Movements seems to be as much Blondeau's (motion of camera, her persona, or movement of the model directed by her) as it is the person who is being photographed. Jim - early strip print from 1968. A man in an open-necked sport shirt is seated in front of the usual back background at two points in the strip about a quarter of the way from the left edge and about two-thirds across. The model is presented in a fully frontal position. In the other parts of the strip he is shown as if seen from a different angle. In another series of strip prints made in 1968, Blondeau develops further emphasis on the print as a whole that the first group established. The effect of the project patterns is to reduce the importance of the models and their actions even further where they become mere variations in the pattern . One figure, usually side-lit, most often nude, was presented in front of the background. Joan and Gunther, 1969: Blondeau attacked abstract quality in her work and took her camera outdoors to record specific, non-directed events . Two of Blondeau's friends are shown playing volleyball. The action becomes clearly narrative in intent - the action is on the surface, and the event becomes a dramatic presentation of sexual interaction. These strip prints were a further step towards her expanding work and style.

=== Later work ===
Blondeau continued to produce images after she had been diagnosed with cancer, and reflected her response to the events occurring in her life with highly charged emotional imagery that speaks directly of her reactions in the face of impending death. Blondeau continued to explore the techniques and issues that had concerned her in her earlier work. Her images, while changing in style throughout her career experiment with new techniques that show a steady progression of the body. The images show an awareness of the illness and the obvious ending as a result. The techniques used throughout her work to create the final prints only created of a few images because of the continual difficulty of her illness. Blondeau produced a series in which she enlarged single 35mm frames to approximately 20x24 inches on high-contrast film and then placed these large transparencies on top of silver or gold mount board. Applying acrylic paint to the back of certain parts of the transparencies, Blondeau was able to focus attention on the most important aspects of the scene represented in the picture. Basic imagery and themes such as people seen on city sidewalks, suggest the existence of secret, private dramas involving both the observed and the observer.

The Warren/Karen Series represents a return to the strip-print format and marks the last time Blondeau used the strip format. During this series, Blondeau began to use a strobe light for the first time. This pulse of the strobe along with the movement of the dancers created a relationship between the dancer and the photographer. It shows the created rhythms of the dancer within the still frame of the image. The natural movements and structure of the dancer and the form created are never complex, but the meaning behind them always is. Many of them seemed to represent a dancer falling in the frame only to rise to their feet again, when in fact it was just the repetitive motion of the standing crouching and standing again. The last pictures in Warren series were taken in 1971.

== Influences ==
Barbara Blondeau acknowledges photographer Eadweard Muybridge, scientist Etienne-Jules Marley, and artist Thomas Eakins as historical influencers for her earlier work on her photographs, specifically relating to her work with motion photography. Eadweard Muybridge was well known for his photography series, Sallie Gardner at a Gallop, or Horse in Motion in 1872, when he was hired to resolve the question of whether or not all four of a racehorse's hooves were ever off the ground simultaneously. In order to do so, Muybridge experimented with cameras and tripwires, and was able to capture the horse in motion ultimately ending the debate that all four hooves do leave the ground at once. Artist Thomas Eakins, another one of Blondeau's previously mentioned influencers, went on to briefly work with Muybridge in Philadelphia and created his own independent motion studies series in the mid-1880s. Eakin's work paralleled more closely with Blondeau's as he focused on the nude figure and used a single camera to produce a series of exposures on a single negative, in comparison to Muybridge's multiple camera technique. Additionally, although scientist Etienne-Jules Marley did not interact with the other two historical influences, his work similarly utilized taking multiple consecutive frames a second to create animation and motion. Marley also studied the human figure and studied locomotion.

The work of these three figures heavily contributed to the development of the motion picture, and encouraged Blondeau to experiment with the exposure time on her photographs. Blondeau utilized the format and the continuous-exposure techniques employed by these historic figures to expand the time referent of her photograph. Blondeau used these techniques in her strip prints, and used the continuous-exposure to expand time by showing the action of her subjects across the length of her prints.

Blondeau also had a few sources of inspiration that prevalent during her era. She was inspired by the Midwest Landscape series by Art Sinsabaugh, drawing the format uses from his rural and urban landscapes in her own work. Blondeau also was inspired by the early work of William Larson who was coincidentally a student at the Institute of Design years after Blondeau had studied there. Larson also made use of the strip format and used the extended-frame format at around the same time as Blondeau. The two did not know of each other's work until they later met in Philadelphia.

== Exhibitions ==
Although Blondeau only had two solo exhibitions during her short career, she was a part twenty-five group shows, eleven after her death. Time-Life Books highlighted her pictures in two of their publications, Frontiers of Photography and The Print. Her work was also published in the magazines Camera, Popular Photography Annual, After Image and Camera Arts. She was a part of the group exhibitions Vision and Expression curated by Nathan Lyons at the George Eastman House and at the Museum of Modern Art, Spaces in 1969-1970 and The Multiple Image from Jul 15–Oct 5, 1993, two of which resulted in exhibition catalogues. Spaces was funded by the National Endowment for the Arts and was created by Aaron Siskind. The show featured other artists such as Ray Metzker, William Larson, Ken Josephson, John Wood, and Michael Bishop. Barbara Blondeau's work was also included in the show, Taken By Design, which included works from the faulty and students of the Institute of Design.

Barbara Blondeau's first solo exhibition at the Laurence Miller Gallery was in 1984. It mainly focused on her time and motion panoramic prints that were created from 1968 to 1972. Her second show at the Laurence Miller Gallery, Permutations, features her 1968-1972 time and motion panoramas, in addition to her 1970 street scenes printed as large positive images on orthochromatic film, her experimental nude studies, and her final work of the "Black Border Series" from 1974. In 2010, Laurence Miller Gallery re-hung the exhibition. Her work is archived in the Visual Studies Workshop in Rochester, New York and was commemorated with a memorial solo exhibition and correlating catalog at the Philadelphia College of Art Gallery, from December 4, 1975 - January 23, 1976.

Her photographs are a part of the permanent collections at Center for Creative Photography, The Metropolitan Museum of Art, The National Gallery of Canada, Museum of Fine Arts in Houston, Philadelphia Museum of Art, The Rhode Island School of Design, the Museum of Modern Art and Colgate University.

== Death ==
On Christmas Eve, 1974 Blondeau's died from breast cancer. Blondeau first learned of her cancer in 1970. An operation was performed to remove the cancer and it was believed to be successful. However, in 1973, the cancer returned. Further operations and chemotherapy failed to stop the spreading of the breast cancer. She deteriorated quickly and was soon unable to move on her own. In October 1974 she entered Philadelphia Hospital for treatment. Less than three months later, on December 24, 1974, Blondeau died after battling cancer for four years. During her fight with breast cancer she had created many new works which reflected, and were greatly influenced by, both her struggle and the many events of her life.

== Legacy ==
Since her death there have been several showings of her work. Colleagues at the Philadelphia College of Art a Memorial Exhibition in 1976, and a traveling Exhibition followed. A Catalogue, Barbara Blondeau 1938-1974 featured works from the Exhibition and an essay was published by Visual Studies Workshop in the same year. In 1984, her strip prints were on display at the Laurence Miller Gallery in New York and the same gallery presented a second show entitled Permutations in 2010. Several group shows have included her photography after her death. Blondeau's Archive is held at Visual Studies Workshop in Rochester, New York.

Barbara Blondeau's esteemed friend and student, David Lebe, has been actively working on developing her legacy with the Philadelphia Museum of Art. Lebe worked closely with Blondeau throughout his career up until she was diagnosed with cancer and died. After she passed, Lebe was a critical aspect in putting together the Memorial Exhibition and editing a catalog of Blondeau's work. Blondeau's stylistic influences are evident throughout his work with the inclusion of experimenting with different forms, such as hand coloring, photograms, and light drawings. Additionally, the recurring themes of death and sexuality are relevant through his works that were inspired by her as well.

In addition to showing her works, the Philadelphia College of Art has created The Barbara Blondeau Memorial Grant, which is awarded to students of Photography and Animation on basis of merit.
