= Douthat =

Douthat may refer to:

- Anita Douthat (born 1950), American photographer
- Douthat, Oklahoma, a ghost town
- Douthat State Park, Virginia
- Ross Douthat (born 1979), American conservative author and journalist
