= Lebe =

Lebe may refer to:

== People ==
- Clément Lebe (born 1979), Cameroonian football player
- David Lebe (born 1948), American photographer
- Reinhard Lebe (1935-2014), German publicist

== Places ==
- Lebe, Pauk, Myanmar

== Other ==
- Lebe (Dogon), religious festival
