= David Lebe =

American photographer (born 1948)

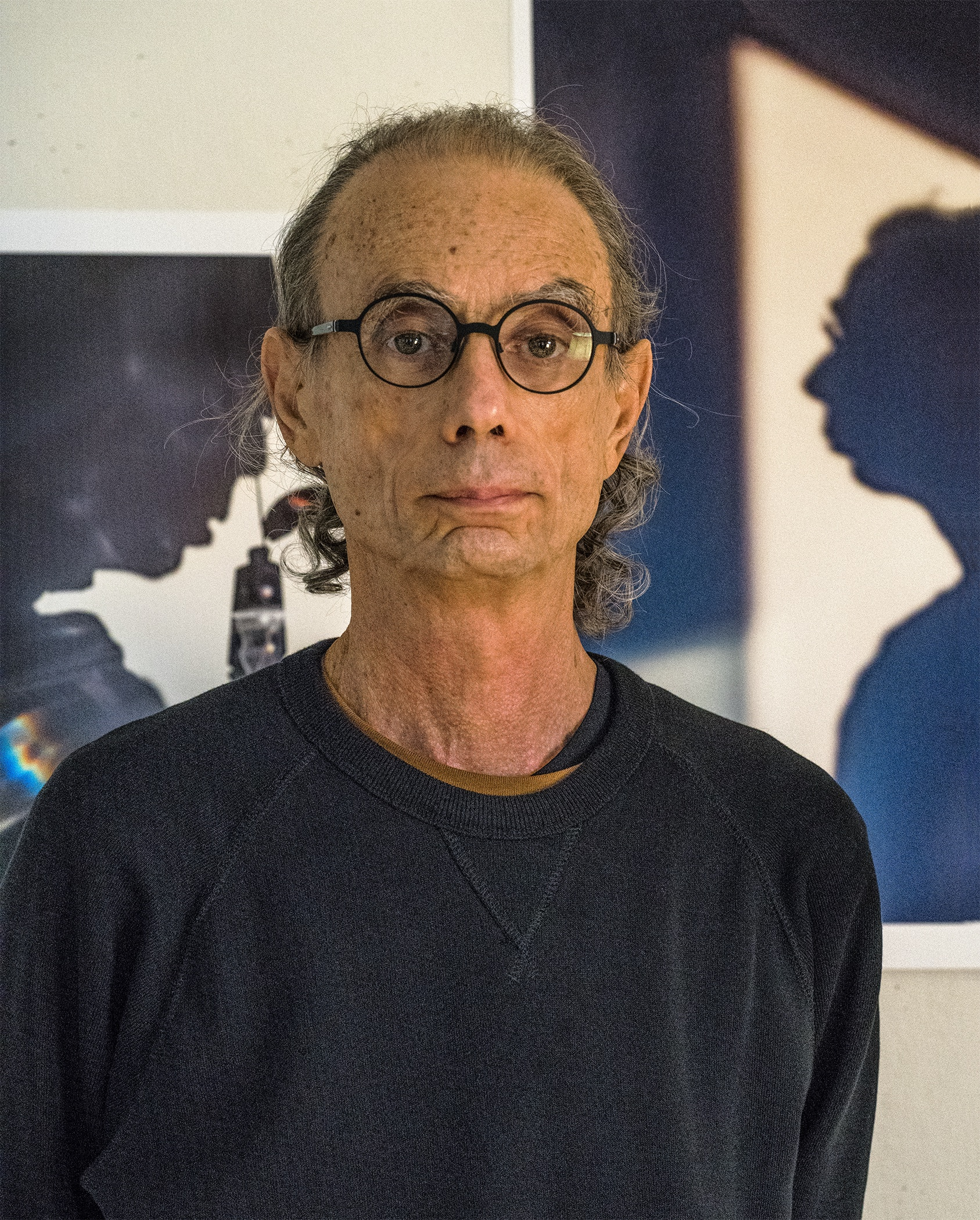
- Born: 1948
- Occupation: Photographer
- Website: www.davidlebe.com

David Lebe (born 1948) is an American photographer. He is best known for his experimental images using techniques such as pinhole cameras, hand-painted photographs, photograms, and light drawings. Many of his photographs explore issues of gay identity, homoeroticism, and living with AIDS, linking his work to that of contemporaries such as Robert Mapplethorpe, Peter Hujar, and David Wojnarowicz. Though his style and approach set him apart from these contemporaries, "Lebe is now incontrovertibly part of the history of twentieth-century queer artists."

== Early life and education ==
Lebe was born in Manhattan and grew up downtown in Stuyvesant Town–Peter Cooper Village. He attended the progressive City and Country School and the High School of Music & Art, from which he graduated in 1966. By age fifteen he had developed a deep interest in photography and regularly visited New York's museums and galleries, where he admired the work of photographers such as Dorothea Lange, Walker Evans, and Robert Frank, among others, and developed a life-long interest in street photography.

In the fall of 1966, Lebe enrolled at the Philadelphia College of Art (PCA), where he studied photography with Ray K. Metzker, Barbara Blondeau, and Tom Porett. All three were graduates of Chicago's Illinois Institute of Technology, founded by László Moholy-Nagy as a successor to Germany's Bauhaus, with a strong tradition of experimentation. It was in Blondeau's class in 1969–70 that he began to experiment with pinhole cameras, building his own devices with multiple apertures that allowed him to record panoramic views of the same subject from various angles. His senior thesis, Form without Substance, consisted largely of high-contrast images with strong black shadows taken in Philadelphia and around his childhood home in Manhattan. These early experiments have informed his approach to photography in subsequent decades, even as his methods and subject matter have changed.

== Artistic career ==
After completing his studies in 1970, Lebe returned to PCA as an instructor in 1972. He would continue teaching at PCA (which became University of the Arts in 1985) until 1990. “An experimentalist less interested in capturing the real than in freeing his images from the constraints of reality,” he has produced multiple bodies of work that explore an array of subjects, often utilizing fundamental, relatively low-tech photographic techniques in innovative ways. Curator Tom Beck notes that “autobiography is the key to [Lebe’s] work, which has shifted from time to time among photograms, light drawings, and male nudes.”

=== Pinhole pictures ===
Lebe's experimentation with pinhole pictures, begun as a student at PCA, continued through 1975. His first cameras had seven or nine apertures and could record 180-degree views but required access to a darkroom to change rolls of film between each photo. Around 1972 he added a more portable four-aperture camera that allowed him to photograph anywhere. Working both in the studio and outdoors, he collaborated with friends and strangers alike. "By opening and closing the apertures at different times, Lebe could create a single, scroll-like print of the whole event, transmuting it into a dreamy collage of social interactions." These images challenge the notion of the photograph as "decisive moment," or record of a single fixed view in a discrete moment in time. "The vision of the world Lebe’s pinhole photographs offer ultimately doesn’t feel so decisive at all," wrote poet and critic Jameson Fitzpatrick. "It is instead a refusal of settling on a definitive version of any given scene. There is no reality, these images suggest, only parallel realities."

=== Hand-painted photographs ===
Although Lebe sometimes shot with color film, he was dissatisfied with the results of color printing and the loss of darkroom control over the images. After finding a hand-coloring set in a camera store in New York, he began hand painting gelatin-silver prints, including pinhole images and photograms, and traditional photographs. In 1974–75 he created a series of images he called Unphotographs, meticulously hand-painted black-and-white photographic portraits of himself and others, often choosing colors that bore no relation to the actual subjects.

=== Photograms ===
In 1976, Lebe purchased a townhouse in Philadelphia with space for living quarters, a darkroom, and a studio. He began making photograms using plants collected from his rooftop garden or from trips to the country or beach. He converted these negative prints into positives, occasionally adding a Sabattier effect during the printing process. Some prints he left black and white; for others, he hand-colored the negative and/or the positive, a unique process that "transformed the photograms into surreal painterly abstractions." Several distinct series emerged from this experimentation: Specimens, which features plants, bones, and other objects combined to create fantastic hybrid forms; Garden Series, images focused exclusively on plant material, often dissected and reassembled to create new “species”; and Landscapes, which places these hybrid forms in hand-painted (and often otherworldly) settings. Of these images, Lebe has said: “I was creating the gardens and landscapes I longed for. Along the way, other ideas got expressed.”

=== Light drawings ===
Lebe's first light drawings were self-portraits made in his small apartment in 1976. Using a 35mm camera on a tripod, he outlined his naked body with the flashlight, adding other lines and squiggles along the way. This initial experiment led to others in which he outlined people and objects, both indoors and outside in the nighttime cityscape. "Braiding the art of photography with the art of drawing, the artist caressed his models with light, sketching their faces, limbs, and genitals, and at times adding small fictional details such as luminous arcs touching the model’s bodies," wrote Lev Feigin in Hyperallergic. "Demarcating the boundaries of desire, light preserves the men’s traces while eliciting a feeling of touch."

Like the earlier pinhole photographs, the light drawings required long exposure times, allowed Lebe to come out from the behind the camera and interact with his subjects. In this sense, his images became records of events rather than of frozen moments in time. “Instead of being a ‘decisive moment,’ the photograph became the decisive twenty minutes,” he recalled in a 1993 interview. “It became the basis for the way I continue to work.”

Lebe continued to make light drawings for about a decade, becoming more and more adept at controlling and manipulating the light sources, which could include flashlights, strobes, and ambient light. In 1987, following the death of a close friend from AIDS and just before his own HIV diagnosis, he began creating abstract, figureless photos drawn freehand with a flashlight. Calling them Scribbles, Lebe made a number of these images, which often feature light emerging from a glass vase in the middle of a darkened space. At first, he felt that the photos “were frivolous and silly, and that I really had a responsibility to be making work that dealt with AIDS.” As he shared them with other people, however, he started to see them as representing the spirits of the dead and came to realize that they were indeed a response to the disease that was ravaging the gay community. “The pictures were really a defiance of the fear and the pain, a kind of celebration of the spirits of so many who had died.”

=== The Scott photographs ===
In 1989, through a mutual friend, Lebe met the adult film star and author Scott O'Hara, who asked Lebe to take pictures of him. Lebe would photograph O’Hara four times between then and O’Hara's death in 1998, in nude and often erotic images that also document the effects of AIDS on O’Hara's body, as well as his determination to embrace sexual pleasure as a positive force in spite of the disease.

Curator Peter Barberie notes that “these images differ from Robert Mapplethorpe’s famous exploration of similar subjects . . . by their emphasis on O’Hara’s personal sexuality. Whereas Mapplethorpe’s photographs are often overtly staged or cropped to objectify body parts and isolated sexual actions, Lebe’s are about his subject’s full presence in the world.” For Lebe, the Scott photographs represent “a refusal to give up on life’s pleasures” and “a triumph of the spirit over AIDS.”

=== Food for Thought and Morning Ritual ===
In 1989, Lebe met Jack Potter, a ceramic artist and horticulturist, and the two quickly began a relationship that has endured for three decades. Both men were HIV-positive when they met, and they were suspicious of the single-drug treatments then being prescribed to fight the disease. After taking a cooking class with chef Christina Pirello, who was then teaching Macrobiotics, they embraced a Macrobiotic diet for about five years and eventually settled on a whole-foods plant-based diet, which they continue to maintain. Seeking a healthier and more peaceful environment, the pair moved to rural Columbia County, New York in 1993.

In 1992, as the couple transitioned from city to country, Lebe had started making still-life photographs featuring the organic vegetables that had become their staple. For this series, which he titled Food for Thought, Lebe shot arrangements of daikon, lotus root, squash, beans, wild kombu, and other foods against black backgrounds, sometimes adding spirals of light around them. In a sense, this series brought together his earlier plant photograms and the light-drawing portraits, with the vegetables standing in for the eroticized male nudes of the latter.

Despite their efforts at a healthy diet and lifestyle, Lebe and Potter both began to decline in the mid-1990s. In 1994, in the series Morning Ritual, Lebe documented his lover's daily self-care regimen in small, intimate black-and-white portraits. "Despite their relatively banal content, the photographs are heavy with the weight of illness and the knowledge not only of one’s own mortality, but also of a beloved’s," wrote Jameson Fitzpatrick in Art in America. "The anxious impulse to document the everyday makes the series seem as much an advance mourning ritual as a morning one." In Jack’s Garden (1996–97) Lebe made detailed studies of the gardens Potter had cultivated around their residence, not knowing how much longer they might have to enjoy them.

=== Recent work ===
In 1996, Lebe and Potter began combination-drug therapy, which was showing great success in extending the lives of HIV-positive individuals. With an extended future, Lebe began exploring new ways of making photographs. By 2004, he had fully embraced digital photography and continued to take pictures of the garden and natural environment around their house for the series On May Hill. He also began making new color prints of older photographs, including his early pinhole prints, which he was now able to enlarge. With the pinholes he fulfilled a fantasy of seeing them the way he had always dreamed of them looking. In 2013 he embarked on a series titled ShadowLife, in which he records shadows and reflections illuminated by the early morning light streaming through the windows of his house, continuing the exploration his life-long fascination with shadows.

Lebe was the subject of a comprehensive survey exhibition at the Philadelphia Museum of Art in February–May 2019, consisting of 145 photographs from 1969 to the present, drawn primarily from the museum's extensive collection of work by the artist.

== Solo exhibitions ==
- 2019. Long Light: Photographs by David Lebe. Philadelphia Museum of Art.
- 2009. Flora: Selections from 30 Years of Work. Sol Mednick Gallery, University of the Arts, Philadelphia.
- 1999. David Lebe. Carrie Haddad Gallery, Hudson, NY.
- 1988. Selected Images. Janvier Gallery, University of Delaware, Newark.
- 1988. New Work. McNeill Gallery, Philadelphia.
- 1988. Light Drawings, Nudes & Photograms. Catherine Edelman Gallery, Chicago.
- 1987. XYZ Gallery, Ghent, Belgium.
- 1986. Truth Fantasy: David Lebe Photographs. Albin O. Kuhn Library and Gallery, University of Maryland, Baltimore County.
- 1985. Mednick Gallery, Philadelphia College of Art, Philadelphia.
- 1985. Vanguard Gallery, Philadelphia.
- 1985. Schacht Fine Arts Center, Russell Sage College, Troy, NY.
- 1985. Light Drawings and Painted Photograms. Marcuse Pfeifer Gallery, New York.
- 1982. Light Drawings and Painted Photograms. Paul Cava Gallery, Philadelphia.
- 1977. The Print Club, Philadelphia.
- 1973. The Greenhouse Gallery, Millbrook, NY.

== Selected group exhibitions ==
- 2019. Photography after Stonewall. New York: Soho Photo Gallery.
- 2014. Poetics of Light: Contemporary Pinhole Photography; Selections from the Pinhole Resource Collection. New Mexico History Museum, Santa Fe.
- 2012. What Was I Thinking: 25 Year Anniversary. Catherine Edelman Gallery, Chicago.
- 2010. Ordinary Things. Carrie Haddad Photographs, Hudson, NY.
- 2009–10. Common Ground: Eight Philadelphia Photographers in the 1960s and 70s: Will Brown, Emmet Gowin, Catherine Jansen, William Larson, David Lebe, Sol Mednick, Ray K. Metzker, Carol Taback. Philadelphia Museum of Art.
- 2009. Afterglow: Four Photographers & the Hand-Held Light; David Lebe, Robert Flynt, Warren Neidrich & Gary Schneider. Carrie Haddad Photographs, Hudson, NY.
- 2009. Paradoxes of Modernism. Albin O. Kuhn Library Gallery, Baltimore.
- 2005. The Silver Garden. Philadelphia Museum of Art.
- 2002. Lightstruck. Emerge Gallery, Greenville, NC.
- 2000. Male Nudes. Carrie Haddad Gallery, Hudson, NY.
- 1998. The Body in Question. Wessel + O’Connor Fine Art, New York.
- 1995. The Nude: Beyond the Studio. Philadelphia Art Alliance.
- 1994. David Lebe, Jock Sturges, Susan Fenton, Anne McDonald. Paul Cava Gallery, Philadelphia.
- 1995. Scott O’Hara: Portraits, Nudes & Hard Dick Images. Mark I. Chester Studio, San Francisco.
- 1995. Go Figure. Paul Cava Gallery, Philadelphia.
- 1993. Flora Photographica. Vancouver Art Gallery; New York Public Library; Royal Ontario Museum, Toronto; Montreal Museum of Fine Arts.
- 1993. Photographs from a Private Collection. Hopkins House Gallery, Haddon Township, NJ.
- 1993. The Alternative Eye. Alleghenies Museum of Art, Loretto, PA.
- 1991. Sexart. Mark I. Chester's Folsom Gallery, San Francisco.
- 1991. The Figure Exposed: 4 Photographers. Paul Cava Gallery, Philadelphia.
- 1990–91. Selections from the Graham and Susan Nash Collection. Los Angeles County Museum of Art.
- 1990. A Midsummer Night’s Dream. Artspace, John Michael Kohler Arts Center, Sheboygan, WI.
- 1990. Personal/Political: Sexuality Self-Defined. School of the Art Institute of Chicago.
- 1990. Contemporary Philadelphia Artists. Philadelphia Museum of Art.
- 1990. Identities: Portraiture in Contemporary Photography. Philadelphia Art Alliance.
- 1990. New Directions in Photography: Sue Abramson, Norinne Betjemann, Susan Fenton, David Lebe. State Museum of Pennsylvania, Harrisburg.
- 1989. Fictive Strategies. Squibb Gallery, Princeton, NJ.
- 1989. Hard Choices & Just Rewards. Levy Gallery, Moore College of Art and Design, Philadelphia; Johnstown Art Museum, Johnstown, PA; Blair Art Museum, Hollidaysburg, PA.
- 1989. Positive I.D. Southern Alleghenies Museum of Art, Loretto, PA.
- 1989. Night Light: 20th Century Night Photography. Nelson-Atkins Museum of Art, Kansas City, MO (plus 10 regional museums).
- 1988–89. Through a Pinhole Darkly. Fine Arts Museum of Long Island, Hempstead, NY; Roanoke Museum of Fine Arts, Roanoke, VA; De Nieuwe Kerk, Amsterdam, Netherlands; Centre Photographique d’Ile-de-France, Paris.
- 1988. Hothouse. John Michael Kohler Arts Center, Sheboygan, WI.
- 1986. Poetic Injury: The Surrealist Legacy in Post Modern Photography. Alternative Museum, New York.
- 1986. Stalking the Light. Noyes Museum, Oceanville, NJ.
- 1986–87. Philadelphia Photographers International. Cigna Corporation, Philadelphia, PA; Free Library of Philadelphia; Tianjin Fine Arts College, Tianjin, People's Republic of China.
- 1987. The Hand-Altered Photograph. Panhandle-Plains Historical Museum, Canyon, TX.
- 1985–86. The Visionary Pinhole. Images Gallery, Cincinnati; University Gallery of Fine Arts, Ohio State University, Columbus.
- 1985–86. Artists for Pride. Philadelphia Lesbian and Gay Task Force.
- 1985. New Artists, New Works. Marianne Deson Gallery, Chicago.
- 1985. Photograms. John Michael Kohler Arts Center, Sheboygan, WI.
- 1984. Lebe, Phillips, Salzmann, Young: Photographs of the Figure. Schmucker Art Gallery, Gettysburg College, Gettysburg, PA.
- 1984. Painted Photographs. Marcuse Pfeifer Gallery, New York.
- 1984. Hand-Colored Photography. Jayne H. Baum Gallery, New York.
- 1984. Contemporary Philadelphia Photographers. Pennsylvania Academy of the Fine Arts, Philadelphia.
- 1984. Radical Photography. Nexus Gallery, Atlanta.
- 1983. Nudes! Marcuse Pfeifer Gallery, New York.
- 1983–84. Lensless Photography. Franklin Institute, Philadelphia; IBM Gallery, New York.
- 1983. Handmade Camera: Contemporary Images. Tyler School of Art, Temple University, Elkins Park, PA.
- 1981. Daniel Wolf Gallery, New York.
- 1980. Made in Philadelphia 5. Institute of Contemporary Art, University of Pennsylvania, Philadelphia.
- 1976. The Hand-Colored Photograph. Philadelphia College of Art Gallery.
- 1975. Seven Photographers Seventy-Five. Hahn Gallery, Philadelphia.

== Selected collections ==
- Albin O. Kuhn Library and Gallery, University of Maryland, Baltimore County
- Allentown Art Museum, Allentown, PA
- First National Bank of Chicago
- FIUWAC – Free International University World Art Collection, Amsterdam
- Haverford College, Haverford, PA
- J. Paul Getty Museum, Malibu, CA
- Leslie Lohman Museum of Gay and Lesbian Art, New York
- Henry S. McNeil Jr., New York
- Miller-Plummer Collection, Philadelphia
- The Museum of Fine Arts, Houston
- Graham and Susan Nash
- The Nelson-Atkins Museum of Art, Hallmark Photographic Collection, Kansas City, MO
- New Mexico History Museum, Santa Fe
- Philadelphia Museum of Art (major collection)
- Pennsylvania Convention Center, Philadelphia
- Hope Proper, Moorestown, NJ
- The State Museum of Pennsylvania, Harrisburg
- Woodmere Art Museum, Philadelphia

== Selected publications ==
=== Monographs ===
- Peter Barberie. Long Light: Photographs by David Lebe. Philadelphia: Philadelphia Museum of Art; New Haven: Yale University Press, 2019.
- Eric Renner, ed. David Lebe: Panoramic Pinhole Photographs, 1969–1975. Special issue, Pinhole Journal 10, no. 2 (August 1994).
- Tom Beck. Truth Fantasy: David Lebe Photographs. Exhibition catalogue. Baltimore: Albin O. Kuhn Library & Gallery, University of Maryland, Baltimore County, 1986.

=== Books and Catalogues ===
- Bill Travis and Larry Davis, eds. Photography after Stonewall. New York: Soho Photo Gallery, 2019.
- Robert Hirsch. Transformational Imagemaking: Handmade Photography Since 1960. New York: Focal Press, 2014.
- Eric Renner and Nancy Spencer. Poetics of Light: Contemporary Pinhole Photography; Selections from the Pinhole Resource Collection, New Mexico History Museum, Santa Fe. Santa Fe: Museum of New Mexico Press, 2014.
- Steve Crist, ed. The Polaroid Book: Selections from the Polaroid Collection of Photography. Cologne: Taschen, 2005.
- David Steinberg, ed. Photo Sex. San Francisco: Down There Press, 2003.
- David Leddick. The Male Nude Now. New York: Universe/Rizzoli, 2001.
- William A. Ewing. Love and Desire: Photoworks. San Francisco: Chronicle, 1999.
- Eric Renner. Pinhole Photography. Newton, MA: Focal Press, 1995.
- Allen Ellenzweig. The Homoerotic Photograph: Male Images from Durieu/Delacroix to Mapplethorpe. New York: Columbia University Press, 1992.
- William A. Ewing. Flora Photographica. London: Thames & Hudson, 1991.
- Emmanuel Cooper. Fully Exposed: The Male Nude in Photography. London: Unwin Hyman, 1990.
- Peter Hay Halpert. Identities: Portraiture in Contemporary Photography. Exhibition catalogue. Philadelphia: The Alliance, 1990.
- Robert Hirsch. Photographic Possibilities. Newton, MA: Focal Press, 1990.
- Philadelphia Museum of Art. Contemporary Philadelphia Artists. Exhibition catalogue. Philadelphia: The Museum, 1990.
- Keith F. Davis. Night Light: A Survey of 20th Century Night Photography. Exhibition catalogue. Hallmark Photographic Collection, Nelson-Atkins Museum, Kansas City, MO plus 10 other museums. Kansas City, MO: Hallmark, 1989.
- Lucille Tortora et al. Through a Pinhole Darkly. Exhibition catalogue. Hempstead, NY: Fine Arts Museum of Long Island, 1988.
- G. Roger Denson, Rosalind Krauss, and Suzan Boettger. Poetic Injury. Exhibition catalogue. New York: The Alternative Museum, 1987.
- Lauren Smith. The Visionary Pinhole. Salt Lake City, UT: Gibbs M. Smith, 1985.
- Eric D. Bookhardt. Radical Photography: The Bizarre Image. Exhibition catalogue. Atlanta: Nexus Press, 1984.
- Paula Marincola. Made in Philadelphia 5. Exhibition catalogue. Philadelphia: Institute of Contemporary Art, University of Pennsylvania, 1980.
- Paula Marincola, ed. The Hand Colored Photograph. Exhibition catalogue. Philadelphia, PA: Philadelphia College of Art, 1979.
- David Lebe, Joan S. Redmond, and Ron Walker, eds. Barbara Blondeau, 1938–1974. Rochester, NY: Visual Studies Workshop, 1976.

=== Articles, Reviews, and Interviews ===
- Richard B. Woodward. “David Lebe, Long Light.” Collector Daily, August 12, 2019.https://collectordaily.com/david-lebe-long-light/
- Matthew Leifheit. “Let Us Now Praise David Lebe.” Aperture, April 24, 2019.https://aperture.org/blog/david-lebe-matthew-leifheit/
- Jameson Fitzpatrick. “The Body Made Light.” Art in America, April 22, 2019. The Body Made Light
- Lev Feigin. “A Photographer’s Infinite Infinitude.” Hyperallergic, April 22, 2019. A Photographer's Intimate Infinitude
- Suzi Nash. “David Lebe: Picture Perfect Exhibition at PMA.” Philadelphia Gay News, April 4, 2019, Home
- “David Lebe's Remarkable Experimental Photography.” Juxtapoz, March 14, 2019, Juxtapoz Magazine - David Lebe's remarkable experimental photography
- Christopher Harrity. “17 Experimental Photos by Philadelphia Artist David Lebe.” The Advocate, March 5, 2019, 17 Experimental Photos by Philadelphia Artist David Lebe
- Elizabeth Otto. Review of Transformational Imagemaking: Handmade Photography since 1960 by Robert Hirsch. History of Photography 39, no. 2 (June 1, 2015), Transformational Imagemaking: Handmade Photography Since 1960.
- Richard Kagan. “An Interview with David Lebe.” The Photo Review 18, no. 2 (Spring 1995).
