= Ruth Thorne-Thomsen =

American photographer (1943–2025)

- Born: Ruth Tenney Thorne-Thomsen; May 13, 1943; New York City, US
- Died: October 27, 2025 (aged 82); Philadelphia, Pennsylvania, US
- Education: Columbia College Chicago; School of the Art Institute of Chicago; Southern Illinois University, Carbondale
- Occupation: Photographer
- Spouse: Ray Metzker (m. 2000; died 2014)

Ruth Tenney Thorne-Thomsen (May 13, 1943 – October 27, 2025) was an American photographer who resided in Philadelphia, Pennsylvania. Important collections of her work are held by the Philadelphia Museum of Art, the Nelson-Atkins Museum, and the Art Institute of Chicago. She was married to the photographer Ray K. Metzker until his death in 2014.

== Life and work ==
Between 1975 and 1993 Thorne-Thomsen produced an unorthodox body of photographs with a pinhole camera. She made portraits of friends and family members, staged toys and other props to create seemingly vast landscapes, and included her own cut-out photographs in some compositions, creating whimsical riffs on art history. Despite the modest appearance of these prints—most are smaller than 4x5 inches and are presented informally, with uneven edges and other markers of their simple production—they form a meditation on photography that has proven influential to other artists. Rooted on the one hand in 19th-century travel views by figures such as Maxime Du Camp and Francis Frith, which captivated Thorne-Thomsen, and on the other hand in amateur photography traditions from the Pictorialist movement onward, which she encountered firsthand in the work of her grandmother and mother, this resolutely un-authoritative group of pictures is a notable body of photography to emerge from the experimental decade of the 1970s.

=== Early life ===
Thorne-Thomsen was born on May 13, 1943, in New York City and raised in Berkeley, California, until age twelve, when her family moved to Lake Forest, Illinois. As a child she spent significant time visiting her grandmother at family ranches in Santa Barbara, where she developed her love for animals, gardening, and wide open spaces. She studied photography at Columbia College Chicago (1971–1973) and the School of the Art Institute of Chicago (1974–1976) following earlier programs in dance and painting at Columbia College, Missouri (1961–1963) and Southern Illinois University, Carbondale (1966–1970). Initially intending to become a dancer, she performed with the Sybil Shearer Dance Company in Northbrook, Illinois from 1964–1965. A 1971 trip to the Brooks Range in Alaska sparked her interest in photography.

=== Career ===
Early in her studies she encountered pinhole photography and began exploring its potential through multiple overlapping series, notably Expeditions (1976–1982), Prima Materia (1984–1987), Views from the Shoreline (1986–1987) and Songs of the Sea (1991–1993). She made many of these pictures in Chicago and Santa Barbara, as well as Door County, Wisconsin, where she and Metzker would visit her parents on their way to Castle Valley, Utah. They owned a home in Castle Valley from 1999 until 2016, and both photographed extensively in the area. Thorne-Thomsen also explored other aspects of photography, notably in her series Messengers (1989–1991), large studies of sculptures and art illustrations that incorporate movement of the camera.

Within This Garden: Photographs by Ruth Thorne-Thomsen accompanied her exhibition of the same title, which was published by The Museum of Contemporary Photography in association with Aperture, with an essay by Denise Miller-Clark and an original poem by Poet Laureate Mark Strand.

=== Personal life ===
Thorne-Thomsen was a descendant of the American statesman Elbridge Gerry Spaulding, so-called “Father of the Greenback,” as well as the Norwegian actress and minister, Fredrikke Nielsen. She lived in a home that she and her husband, Ray K. Metzker, built together in Philadelphia, where she maintained an extensive garden. She and Metzker were married in 2000, having been partners since the 1980s. She died at the age of 82 on October 27, 2025, in Philadelphia, from respiratory failure.

== Collections ==
- Art Institute of Chicago
- Bibliothèque Nationale, Paris
- Center for Creative Photography, Tucson
- Centre Georges Pompidou, Paris
- Cleveland Museum of Art
- Denver Art Museum
- Honolulu Museum of Art
- International Center of Photography
- J. Paul Getty Museum
- Los Angeles County Museum of Art
- The Metropolitan Museum of Art
- Milwaukee Museum of Art
- Museum of Contemporary Art Chicago
- Museum of Contemporary Photography
- Museum of Fine Arts, Houston
- Nelson-Atkins Museum of Art
- Philadelphia Museum of Art
- Rockford Art Museum Rockford, IL
- San Francisco Museum of Modern Art
- The Walker Art Center, Minneapolis
- Whitney Museum of American Art

== Exhibitions ==
- 2000
  - Le Siecle du Corps- Photographs of the Ancient World, Le Musee de L'Elysée Lausanne, Switzerland
  - Orphans, Schmidt Dean Gallery Philadelphia, PA
- 1999
  - The Cultured Tourist, Leslie Tonkonow Gallery New York, NY
- 1998
  - A Retrospective Journey – Photographs by Ruth Thorne-Thomsen, Jackson Fine Art Atlanta, GA
  - Egypt of the Mind, Denver Art Museum Denver, CO
  - Years Ending in Nine, Museum of Fine Arts Houston, TX
- 1997
  - Eye of the Beholder: Photographs from the Avon Collection, International Center of Photography New York, NY
  - Fifty Years of Contemporary American Photography: 1947–1997, Venlo, Netherlands
  - ARCO-Art Expo Madrid, Spain
- 1996
  - Kobe Aid Fund, World Photo Art Exhibition and Auction Tokyo, Japan
  - Art in Chicago, 1945–1995, Museum of Contemporary Art Chicago, IL
  - Portfolio – Ruth Thorne-Thomsen, Vigovisions, V Fotobienal Vigo, Spain
- 1994
  - Explorations, Past Rays Photo Gallery & Gallery Nayuta Yokohama, Japan
  - Within This Garden: Photographs by Ruth Thorne-Thomsen, California Museum of Photography Riverside, CA
- 1993
  - Within This Garden: Photographs by Ruth Thorne-Thomsen, Museum of Contemporary Photography Chicago, IL
  - Cleveland Museum of Art Cleveland, OH
