= Beverly Hills Financial Center =

Building in Beverly Hills, California

Coordinates: 34.067455°N 118.398173°W

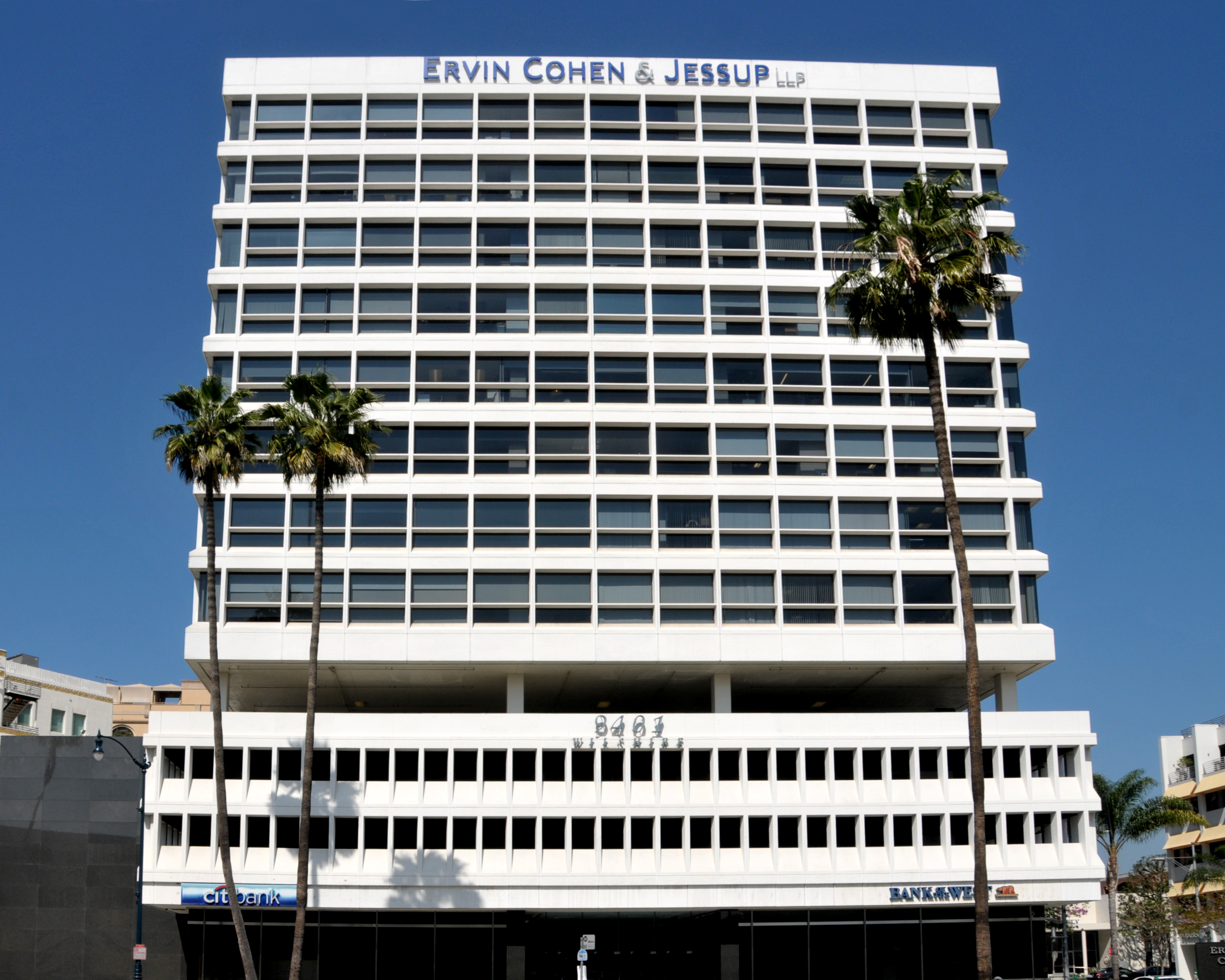
- Interactive map of the Beverly Hills Financial Center area

General information
- Status: Completed
- Location: 9401 Wilshire Boulevard, Beverly Hills, California
- Completed: 1972

Technical details
- Floor count: 12

Design and construction
- Architect: Howard Lane

The Beverly Hills Financial Center is a landmark building in Beverly Hills, California.

== Location ==
It is located at 9401 on Wilshire Boulevard in the City of Beverly Hills, California.

== History ==
Completed in 1972, it was designed by architect Howard Lane in the modernist architectural style. Its facade is white. It is 42.67 metre high, with twelve floors. It is the third tallest building in Beverly Hills after the Beverly Wilshire Hotel and the Bank of America Building.

It was renovated in 1999.
