= John Wood (artist) =

American artist and educator (1922–2012)

John Cheney Wood (July 10, 1922 – July 20, 2012) was an American artist and educator who challenged traditional photography and often incorporated other mediums into his work. He was born in California in 1922. In 1943 he volunteered for the Army Air Corps, where he served as a B-17 pilot until 1945. At the time of his death he lived in Baltimore, Maryland, with artist Laurie Snyder.

== Education ==
John Wood studied at the Institute of Design in Chicago under the direction of Harry Callahan and Art Sinsabaugh and earned a degree in 1954. During his final year as a student, he taught a course on visual fundamentals. Immediately after graduation he was offered a teaching position at Alfred University where he taught for 35 years until he retired.

== Artwork ==
Wood had the ability to work across a variety of artistic forms, from straight photography, collage, cliché verre, solarization, mixed media, offset lithography to drawing. Wood moved freely between conceptual and visual exploration, not adhering to a single style. Although he often raised questions about political, social and environmental issues, he avoided promoting personal solutions or adding narratives to the images. The artist instead preferred to focus on the viewer’s interpretation and the possibility for multiple meanings.

== Exhibitions ==
Wood has been exhibited widely, including a 2009 retrospective at the International Center of Photography and two exhibitions at Bruce Silverstein Gallery in New York. Other exhibitions were held at the Corcoran Gallery of Art, Washington D.C.; Metropolitan Museum of Art, New York; Art Institute of Chicago; Philadelphia Museum of Art, National Gallery of Canada, Ottawa; Los Angeles County Museum of Art; Museum of Fine Arts, Houston; San Francisco Museum of Modern Art; and the George Eastman House, Rochester among others.

== Collections ==
His work can be found in major collections, notably the Center for Creative Photography, Tucson; Los Angeles County Museum of Art; Museum of Fine Arts, Houston; Baltimore Museum of Art; Art Institute of Chicago; Museum of Modern Art, New York; National Gallery of Canada, Ottawa; San Francisco Museum of Modern Art; Smithsonian Institution, Washington D.C.; and at the Visual Studies Workshop, Rochester.
