= Lina Nilsson (scientist) =

American biologist

- Citizenship: USA
- Education: ETH Zurich, Dr.Sc.; University of Washington, MS; Illinois Institute of Technology, BS
- Awards: MIT TR 35 under 35, Bonderman Fellow, ETH Medal
- Scientific career
- Fields: Bioengineering, synthetic biology, technology
- Workplaces: Blum Center for Developing Economies, Tekla Labs, Enlitic, Recursion Pharmaceuticals

Lina Nilsson is an American biomedical engineer known for her work in technology and entrepreneurship. She was named one of MIT Technology Review's 35 Innovators Under 35 and has been interviewed or profiled by Fortune and the White House's Office of Science and Technology Policy. She has been published in The New York Times, The Washington Post, Science, Make Magazine, and various scientific journals.

== Early life and education ==
Nilsson received a B.S. in Chemical Engineering from the Illinois Institute of Technology, followed by a M.S. in Biomedical Engineering from the University of Washington. As a PhD candidate at the University of Washington, she applied for and was awarded a Bonderman Travel Fellowship, which "gives students eight months to “come to know the world in new ways.”" She visited biology labs in Asia and South America, where she saw researchers hindered by lack of access to proper laboratory equipment. Nilsson has a Dr.Sc. from the Swiss Federal Institute of Technology, where she received the ETH Medal for an outstanding doctoral thesis.

== Career ==
Nilsson moved to the University of California, Berkeley, where she worked as a postdoc and was named the Innovation Director at the Blum Center for Developing Economies. Drawing from her Bonderman Fellow experiences, she cofounded Tekla Labs there to develop high quality, open-source lab equipment that scientists could build themselves. In 2013, MIT Technology Review selected her as one of its 35 Innovators Under 35 for work at the Blum Center and Tekla Labs, and along with the others named, she appeared at the magazine's Emtech conference.

From 2015 to 2017, Nilsson worked at Enlitic as first the Head of Market Development, then the Vice President of Strategy and Operations, and then the Chief Operating Officer. She now works at Recursion Pharmaceuticals.

Nilsson's areas of interest include technological innovation, access to laboratory equipment for low-income students, and retention and recruitment of women to engineering. In interviews, she has spoken on the importance of socially conscious engineering courses and emphasizing humanitarian end goals to attract more women to the profession. On the topic of expanding infrastructure and access, she states that equipment and resource access is the "new horizon for democratizing science, beyond open data and open knowledge movements (such as open access science journals)." Nilsson has also advocated for the field of development engineering as a method of aiding and uplifting low-income communities.

== Selected publications ==
- Lina Nilsson and Shankar Sastry. "Engineering improvements for the world." October 5, 2014. The Washington Post. Article
- Lina Nilsson. "Ph.D.'s, come out of the closet!" 08 Aug 2014, Vol. 345, Issue 6197, pp. 706. doi:10.1126/science.345.6197.706
- Lina Nilsson, Temina Madon, S. Shankar Sastry. "Toward a New Field of Development Engineering: Linking Technology Design to the Demands of the Poor." Procedia Engineering, Volume 78, 2014, Pages 3–9, ISSN 1877-7058, https://doi.org/10.1016/j.proeng.2014.07.032
- Lina Nilsson. "Lina Nilsson: Is Utah poised to become the best place for women in tech?" 01 Aug 2019. The Salt Lake Tribune. Article
- Nilsson, Lina. “Unblenders, Dremelfuges, and Optical Tweezers.” 24 July 2012. Make: DIY Projects and Ideas for Makers. Article
