= John Calamos =

Greek-American businessman (born 1940)

- Education: Illinois Institute of Technology
- Occupations: Businessman; Founder of Calamos Asset Management

John P. Calamos, Sr. (born 1940) is a Greek-American businessman who founded Calamos Asset Management, which manages $52 billion in assets on behalf of institutions and individual investors, in 1977. A veteran of the Vietnam War, he served as a United States Air Force Bomber Pilot/Forward Air Controller with more than 900 combat hours. Calamos received a bachelor's degree in business and economics from Illinois Institute of Technology in 1963 and an MBA in 1970, and currently serves on the IIT Board of Trustees. He also serves as Chairman of the National Hellenic Museum.

He is a mutual-fund manager and a self-made billionaire with an estimated net worth of 2.7 billion dollars according to Forbes. Calamos built his reputation investing in convertible bonds and has written two books: Investing in Convertible Securities: Your Complete Guide to the Risks and Rewards (Longman Financial Services Publishing) and Convertible Securities: the Latest Instruments, Portfolio Strategies, and Valuation Analysis (McGraw Hill).

== Early life ==
The son of Greek immigrants, Calamos was born and raised on Chicago's West Side and grew up living in an apartment above his parents' grocery store on the 5100 block of West Division St. As a teenager he discovered some old stock certificates in the backroom of the grocery store. While they were worthless, he’s said they sparked his interest in investments. During his college years, he convinced his mother to back a $5,000 stock portfolio investment. Among the stocks he purchased was Texas Instruments which tripled in value. A lifelong entrepreneur, Calamos financed his education with income from a string of launderettes, and went on to become a military pilot during the Vietnam War before launching his career as an investment adviser

== Education and military service ==
Calamos studied at Illinois Institute of Technology, also known as Illinois Tech. His undergraduate interests began in architecture, however he shifted his major to business and economics, earning a bachelor’s in 1963, while also studying philosophy. He often points to philosophy for teaching him to question assumptions and think critically, which he credits much of his success

In 1965, Calamos attended flight school at Webb Air Force Base in Big Spring, Texas. One year later he was flying supersonic jets at night in formation. He served five years of active duty including a year in Vietnam where he flew nearly 900 combat hours. In 1969, he was awarded the Distinguished Flying Cross.

In 1970, Calamos earned an MBA from IIT.

== Calamos Asset Management ==
Calamos, sometimes called the “Convertible Bond King,” made his fortune by founding and taking public Naperville, Illinois-based Calamos Asset Management, a mutual-fund company that as of 2007 oversaw nearly $43 billion in assets. By September 2016 assets under management at the firm had declined to 20.2 billion, while the firm's stock price had declined to about half of what it was in 2014.

In March 2016, Calamos relinquished the CEO title after struggling for two years to reverse a decline in the company's business and stock price. He retained the role of Chairman and Chief Investment Officer and in 2017 led a group that reacquired Calamos Asset Management in a “go-private” transaction. Calamos remains active in the firm.

== Philanthropy ==
Individually and through the John P. Calamos, Sr., Foundation, Calamos has made contributions to education through support of the Illinois Institute of Technology (Illinois Tech) and the National Hellenic Museum, both located in his native Chicago. He sponsored the exhibit, The Greeks, at the Field Museum, which lead to a three-part PBS documentary of the same name.

In 2011, Calamos along with his wife Mae committed $10 million to Illinois Tech, part of which established two endowed chairs, one in business and a second in philosophy. In 2016, John F. O. Bilson was invested as the John and Mae Calamos Stuart School of Business Dean Endowed Chair, and in 2018, J.D. Trout was invested as the John and Mae Calamos Endowed Chair in Philosophy.

An Aurora, Illinois resident and Naperville, Illinois business owner, his Calamos Real Estate completed the 25-acre expansion of the CityGate Centre campus, known as CityGate North, which was projected to bring 500 construction jobs and more than 100 full and part-time operational jobs to the area. The recent 25-acre expansion of the CityGate Centre campus, known as CityGate North, is projected to bring 500 construction jobs and more than 100 full and part-time operational jobs to the area. In addition, events such as tournaments and expos will help support the 17 lodging sites operating in Naperville, as well as the areas many restaurants. It has received the endorsement of Naperville’s Mayor Steve Chirico’s Office and the Naperville Development Partnership, a public/private economic development organization that promotes business interests in the City of Naperville.

== Criticism ==
In 2007, Calamos was criticized by an activist investor who pushed for greater accountability and higher returns as well as concerns over potential self-dealing.

In September 2016, it was reported that a former Calamos employee had filed a whistleblower lawsuit against the firm and Calamos personally after sending an email to Calamos and three other executives expressing concerns about "shrinking assets, poor financial results, a high cost structure, conflicts of interest and personnel moves, abilities and turnover." At the time, a Calamos official called the lawsuit “frivolous” and noted that the plaintiff had a history of bringing legal action against his employers; the suit in the U.S. District Court (Northern District Eastern Division) of Illinois was dismissed with prejudice. [Case: 1:16-cv-09314 Document #: 41 Filed: 10/19/17 Page 1 of 1 PageID #:423]
