= Howard Lane =

American architect

- Born: October 13, 1922; Chicago, Illinois, U.S.
- Died: November 3, 1988 (aged 66); Santa Monica, California, U.S.
- Education: Illinois Institute of Technology
- Occupation: Architect
- Spouse: Shirley Lane
- Children: 3

Howard Lane (October 13, 1922 – November 3, 1988) was an American architect based in Los Angeles, California.

== Early life ==
Howard Raymond Lane was born on October 13, 1922, in Illinois. He served in the 3rd Armored Division of the United States Army in Europe during World War II. Shortly after the war, he studied architecture at the Illinois Institute of Technology, where Mies van der Rohe was his professor. He graduated in 1947.

== Career ==
After briefly working as a draftsman for Skidmore, Owings and Merrill in Chicago in 1947, he moved to Los Angeles in 1948. He worked as a draftsman for Martin and Associates and later as Project Architect for Pereira and Luckman until 1952. He established his own architectural firm, the Lane Architectural Group in 1953. It was based in Woodland Hills.

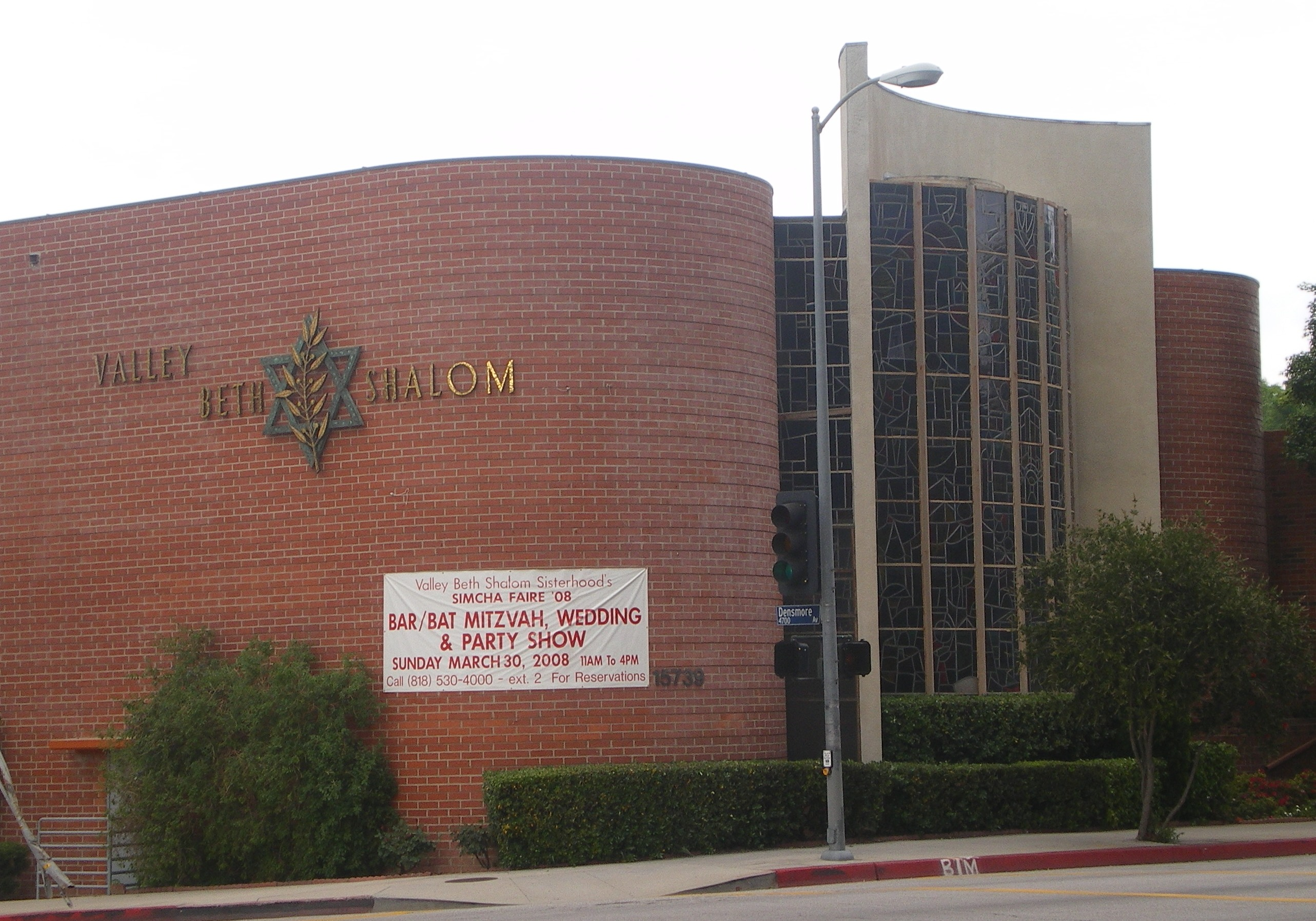
Valley Beth Shalom in Encino, California.

Most of his architectural designs were commercial buildings.

However, he also designed a few private residences and places of worship. In 1957, he designed the Schustack Residence in the Hollywood Hills. Along with fellow architect Edward Ray Schlick, he designed the Valley Beth Shalom Conservative synagogue, located at 17100 Ventura Boulevard in Encino.

In 1966, he designed the Travelers Insurance Building, a commercial building, in the Neo-Streamline Moderne style, located at 16661 Ventura Boulevard.

He designed the Beverly Hills Financial Center in 1972. It is the third-tallest building in Beverly Hills.

He was a fellow of the American Institute of Architects and served as the president of its California Council in 1977.

== Personal life ==
He was married to Shirley Lane. They had a son, Rod, and two daughters, Laura and Barbara.

== Death ==
He died on November 3, 1988, in Santa Monica, California.
