= Tekla Labs =

Research DIY nongovernmental organisation

- Tekla Labs logo
- Formation: 2010 Berkeley, California, United States
- Website: www.teklalabs.org

Tekla Labs (TeklaLabs.org) is a non-profit organization of researchers, educators and hobbyists committed to developing do it yourself (DIY) science infrastructure. Tekla Labs objective is to "enable scientists to construct their own high quality lab equipment using readily available, off the shelf items." Tekla Labs has been featured in numerous publications, including in MAKE, TechHive, Nature.com Blogs, New Scientist, and SciDev.Net.

== History ==
The organization was founded in 2010 in Berkeley, California by postdoctoral and graduate student researchers at UC Berkeley and UCSF.

One of the founders, Lina Nilsson, cofounded Tekla Labs to develop high quality, open-source lab equipment that scientists could build themselves. She drew on her experiences visiting biology labs in Asia and South America, where she saw researchers hindered by lack of access to proper laboratory equipment.

== See also ==
- Open Source Lab (book)
