= Anita Douthat =

American photographer

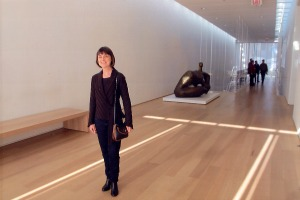
- Born: Anita Douthat; 1950 (age 75–76); Cincinnati
- Education: Illinois Institute of Technology; University of New Mexico
- Known for: Fine art photography

Anita Douthat (born 1950) is an American photographer. Her photograms have been included in exhibitions at the Cincinnati Art Museum; Indianapolis Art Center; Ross Art Museum at Ohio Wesleyan University; and the Weston Art Gallery in the Aronoff Center for the Arts. She has been the recipient of grants from the National Endowment for the Arts, the New England Foundation for the Arts, and the Kentucky Foundation for Women.

== Early life and education ==
Douthat was born in Cincinnati. She received a Bachelor of Science from the Institute of Design at the Illinois Institute of Technology (Chicago, IL) in 1972 and a master of fine arts from the University of New Mexico (Albuquerque, NM) in 1986.

== Artistic process ==
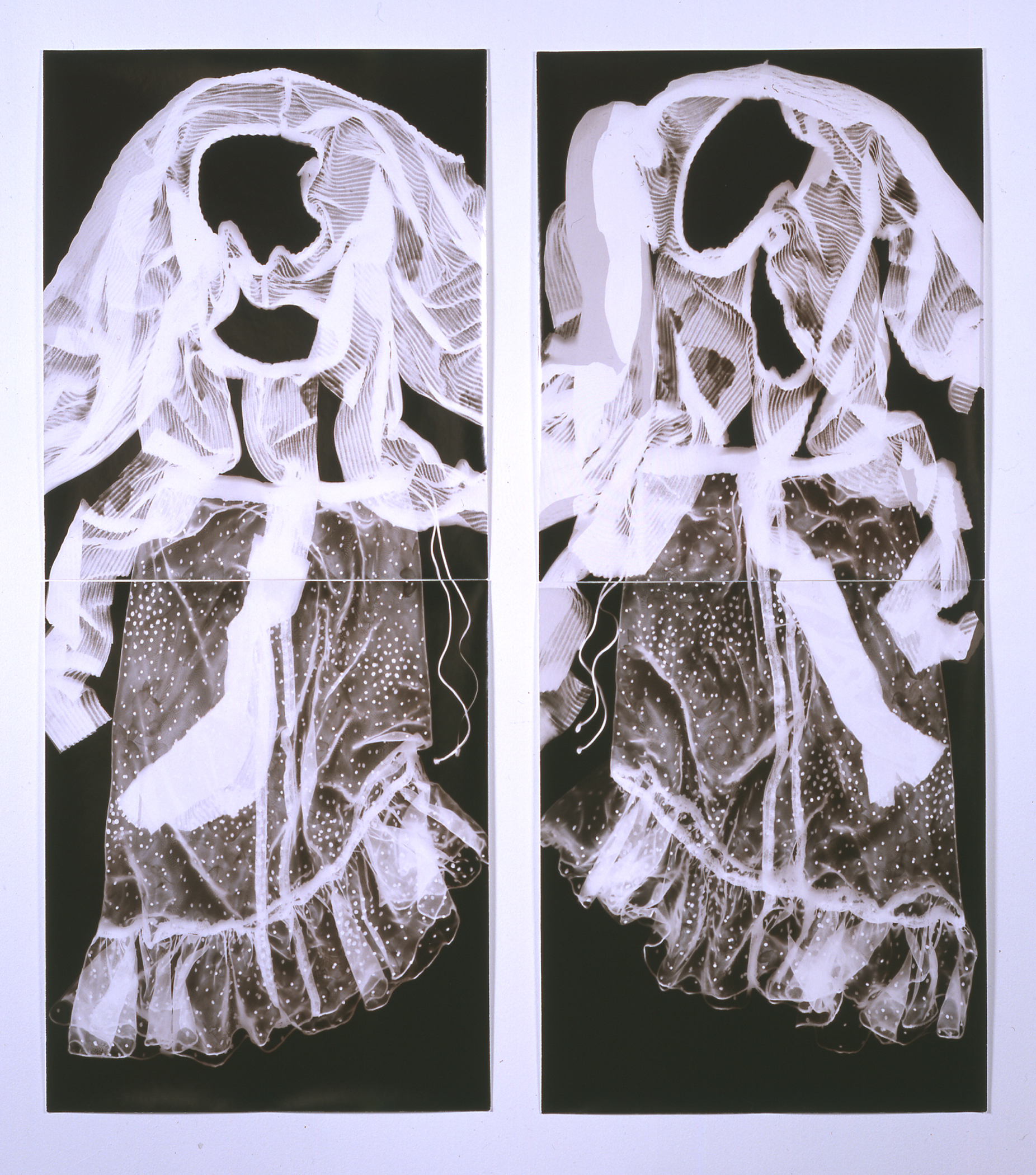
Under the Sun

Douthat makes large photograms. She places found objects, chosen for their transparent or opaque qualities, atop photosensitive paper and lets the light burn through to create silhouette-like imagery. Later, the paper is chemically gold-toned—it gets a purplish color—and fixed for permanence. Her Alterations series is of life size images of women's apparel, including wedding dresses.

== Professional career ==
From 1985 to 1992, she was curator of the Photographic Resource Center at Boston University and is currently associate director of the Carl Solway Gallery (Cincinnati, OH).

== Early works ==
1974- Photographed the Mayan ruins for an academic journal about early Mayan Society. Collection of 5 photographs were published in the Chicago Review.

== Personal life ==
Stated that one of her professors, Professor Siegel, at Illinois Institute of Technology was one of the first people who piqued her interest in the technical aspects of photography. She currently resides in Alexandria, Kentucky.

== Publications ==
- "On the Artistic Use of Fluid Flow Patterns Made Visible". Leonardo. 8 (1). 1975. doi:10.2307/1573181.
- "Mayan Ruins". Chicago Review. 25 (4). 1974. doi:10.2307/25303052.

== Awards ==
Douthat has received awards and grants for her work from the following bodies:

- New England Foundation for the Arts
- MacDowell Colony, Peterborough, NH
- National Endowment for the Arts, Visual Artists Fellowship in Photography
- Kentucky Foundation for Women

== Collections ==
Douthat's work is held in the following permanent collections:

- Cincinnati Art Museum, Cincinnati, OH
- Museum of Fine Arts, Houston, TX
- Columbus Museum of Art, Columbus, OH
- University of New Mexico Art Museum, Albuquerque, NM

== Exhibitions ==
=== Solo exhibitions ===
- 1992: In Praise of Shadows, Houston Center for Photography
- 1993: Vanishing Act, Robert C. May Gallery of Photography, University of KY, Lexington
- 1994: Defying Gravity, Carnegie Arts Center, Covington, KY
- 2007: With a Trace, Indianapolis Art Center, IN
- 2014: Under the Sun, Westin Art Gallery, Aronoff Center, Cincinnati, OH.

=== Group exhibitions ===
- 2015: After the Moment: Reflections on Robert Mapplethorpe, Contemporary Art Center, Cincinnati, OH.
- 2015: Photography Since the Millennium, Carnegie Center for Art & History, New Albany, IN
