= Ray Metzker =

American photographer (1931–2014)

Ray Krueger Metzker
- Born: September 10, 1931; Milwaukee, Wisconsin, US
- Died: October 9, 2014 (aged 83); Philadelphia, Pennsylvania, US
- Education: Institute of Design in Chicago
- Occupation: photographer
- Awards: Royal Photographic Society Honorary Fellowship

Ray K. Metzker (September 10, 1931 – October 9, 2014) was an American photographer known chiefly for his stark, experimental Black and White cityscapes and for his large assemblages of printed film strips and single frames, known as Composites.

Neither seeking nor achieving particular renown during his lifetime, Metzker's work is held in more than 45 major public collections; is the subject of eight monographs; and was the subject of 50 one-man exhibitions. He received awards including the John Simon Guggenheim Memorial Foundation, National Endowment for the Arts and Royal Photographic Society.

His longtime dealer, Laurence Miller, called Metzker "the last great Modern photographer."

== Background ==
Born in Milwaukee on Sept. 10, 1931 to William Martin Metzker and Mary Helen Metzker (nee Kreuger). Metzker grew up with a brother, Carl and a sister Mary Ellen. With his parents focused on his sister's cerebral palsy, Metzker developed a sense of isolation; he considered himself "acutely shy". Metzker loved classical music, history and drawing, but his passion for photography was cemented when his mother gave him a camera at age 12. Photography "gave him a connection, a way of formally encountering the world and expressing his love for it, or what he calls his belief “about the goodness of things." Metzker would develop photographs in his bedrooom, winning numerous high school competitions sponsored by Eastman Kodak.

Metzker graduated from Beloit College in Wisconsin with a fine arts degree in 1953; entered the Army and served in Korea; subsequently graduating with a Master's degree in 1959 from the Institute of Design at the Institute of Design in Chicago — where he studied with eminent photographers Harry Callahan and Aaron Siskind.

He lived in Philadelphia from the 1960s until his death, was married to the photographer Ruth Thorne-Thomsen, and died in Germantown, Philadelphia on October 9, 2014.

== Career ==
Metzker taught for many years at the Philadelphia College of Art and also taught at the University of New Mexico.

After graduate studies at the Institute of Design in Chicago, Metzker travelled extensively throughout Europe in 1960-61, where he had two epiphanies: that "light" would be his primary subject, and that he would seek synthesis and complexity over simplicity. Metzker often said the artist begins his explorations by embracing what he doesn't know.

== Awards ==
- 1966: Guggenheim Fellowship, John Simon Guggenheim Memorial Foundation.
- 1975: National Endowment for the Arts Fellowship.
- 1988: National Endowment for the Arts Fellowship.
- 1989: Bernheim Fellowship at the Bernheim Arboretum and Research Forest, Clermont, Kentucky.
- 2000: Centenary Medal, Royal Photographic Society, Bath (HonFRPS).

== Collections ==
Metzker's work is held in the following public collections:

- Art Institute of Chicago.
- Art Museum of West Virginia University, Morgantown.
- Albertina Museum, Vienna.
- Los Angeles County Museum of Art.
- Museum of Fine Arts, Houston.
- Museum of Modern Art, New York: 14 prints (as of 22 December 2021)
- Nelson-Atkins Museum of Art, Kansas City.
- J. Paul Getty Museum, Los Angeles.
- Whitney Museum of American Art, New York: 14 prints (as of 15 December 2021)
- Metropolitan Museum of Art, New York.
- Philadelphia Museum of Art, Philadelphia
- Addison Gallery of American Art, Andover, Mass.
- Princeton University Art Museum, Princeton, NJ.
- National Gallery of Australia, Canberra
- Baltimore Museum of Art, Baltimore, Md.
- Beloit College, Beloit, Wisconsin.
- Bibliotheque Nationale, Paris
- Center for Creative Photography, University of Arizona, Tucson.
- Cleveland Museum of Art, Ohio
- Davison Art Center, Middleton, Conn.
- The Detroit Institute of Arts, Michigan.
- Fogg Art Museum, Harvard Art Museums, Harvard University, Cambridge, Mass.
- Fonds National d'Art Contemporain, Paris
- High Museum of Art, Atlanta, Ga.
- George Eastman Museum, Rochester, NY.
- Speed Art Museum, Louisville, Ky.
- Maison européenne de la photographie, Paris.
- Musée de l'Élysée, Lausanne.
- Milwaukee Art Museum, Milwaukee.
- Chrysler Museum of Art, Norfolk, Va.
- Museum of Fine Arts, Boston, Boston
- National Gallery of Art, Washington, D.C.
- National Gallery of Canada, Ottawa.
- Smithsonian American Art Museum, Washington, D.C.
- Tokyo Metropolitan Museum of Photography, Japan.
- Sheldon Memorial Art Gallery, Lincoln, Nebraska.
- Saint Louis Art Museum, St. Louis, Mo.
- Toledo Museum of Art, Toledo, Ohio.
- Worcester Art Museum, Worcester, Mass.
