= Art Sinsabaugh =

American photographer

Art Sinsabaugh (1924-1983) was an American photographer.

== Biography ==
Sinsabaugh was born in 1924 in Irvington, New Jersey. From 1949 to 1959 he worked part-time as an instructor at IIT Institute of Design. Sinsabaugh was an assistant professor at the University of Illinois from 1959 until he died in 1983 in Chicago, Illinois. From 1972 to 1973 he worked for the Center for Advanced Studies and University of Illinois where he was an associate member. He was one of the founders of the Society for Photographic Education. In 1966 he was awarded Illinois Arts Council Award and Graham Foundation for Advanced Studies in the Fine Arts Award. In 1969 he became a fellow in Guggenheim and by 1977 became a fellow at the National Endowment for the Arts Photographers'. The Indiana University Art Museum houses the Art Sinsabaugh archive containing over 3,000 photographs, family memorabilia, and Sinsabaugh's personal papers
