= Artspace Visual Arts Centre =

Contemporary art center in Woolloomooloo, Sydney, Australia

Artspace Sydney
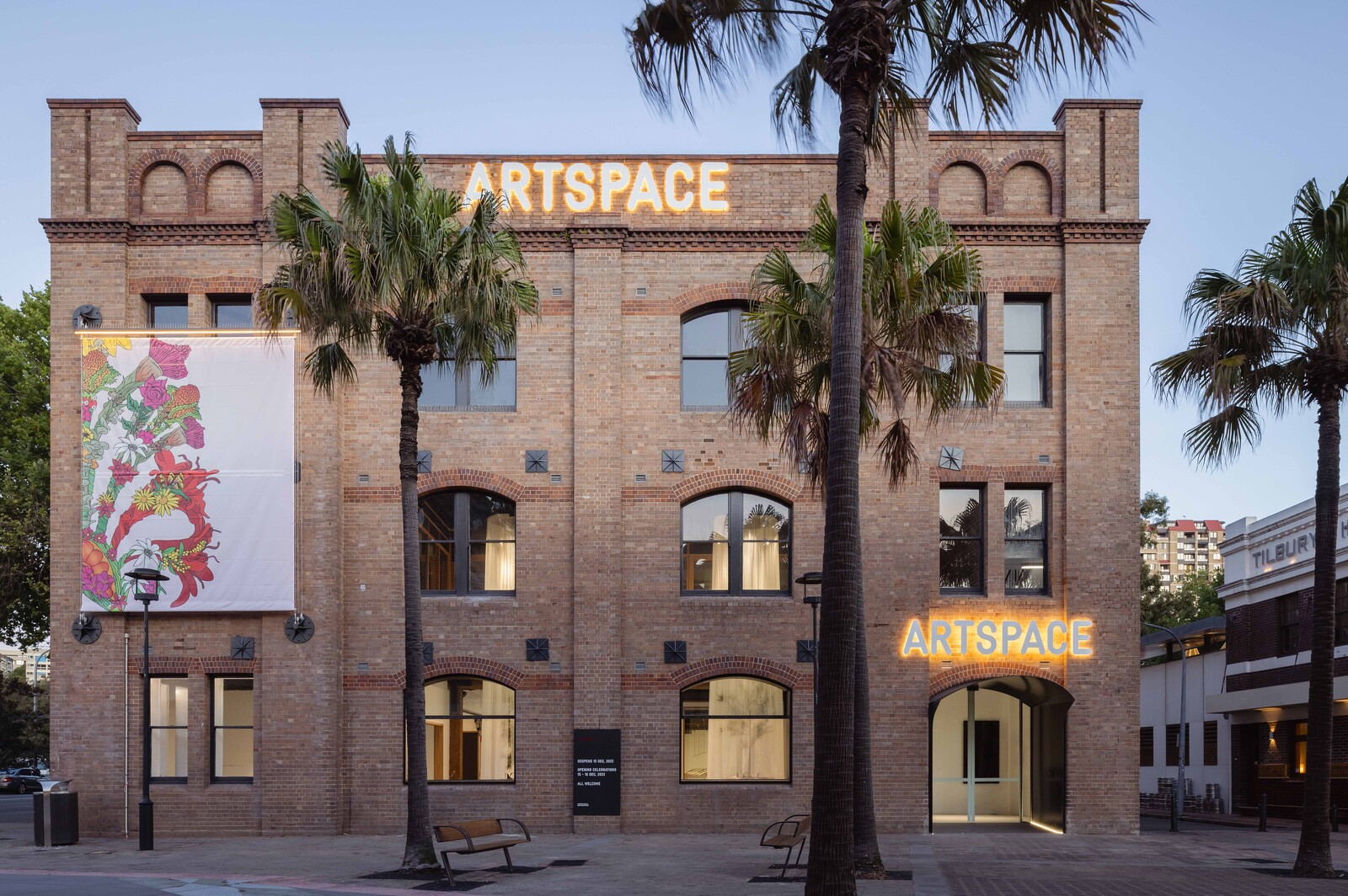

- Location within inner Sydney
- Location: Woolloomooloo, Sydney, New South Wales, Australia
- Coordinates: 33°52′10″S 151°13′14″E
- Type: Contemporary art
- Visitors: 363,762 (2019)
- Executive director: Victor Wang
- Website: artspace.org.au

Artspace, officially Artspace Visual Arts Centre, is an independent, not-for-profit, and non-collecting residency-based contemporary art centre. Artspace is housed in the historic Gunnery Building in Woolloomooloo, fronting Sydney Harbour in Sydney, Australia. In December 2023, Artspace reopened following a transformation into a multi-platform contemporary art centre, with expanded exhibition spaces and an increased number of rent-free artist studios.

== History ==
Artspace was established in 1983 as an artist-run gallery with a focus on the presentation of contemporary and experimental art. Founded in response to commercial galleries and major national collecting institutions, Artspace was conceived as an alternative exhibition space committed to working with emerging and early-career artists. It is devoted to the development of certain new ideas and practices in contemporary art and culture.

Artspace was originally located at 11 Randle Street, Surry Hills, a former hat factory built in 1912. This building was destroyed in a major fire in 2023. Artspace opened at its Surry Hills location with its first major exhibition ‘A Different Perspective’ curated by Terence Maloon in conjunction with the Multicultural Artists Agency. In its early years, Artspace exhibited works by then-early career artists including Mikala Dwyer, Rosemary Laing, Lindy Lee, Banduk Marika, Tracey Moffatt, John Nixon, Michael Riley, Turkey Tolson Tjupurrula.

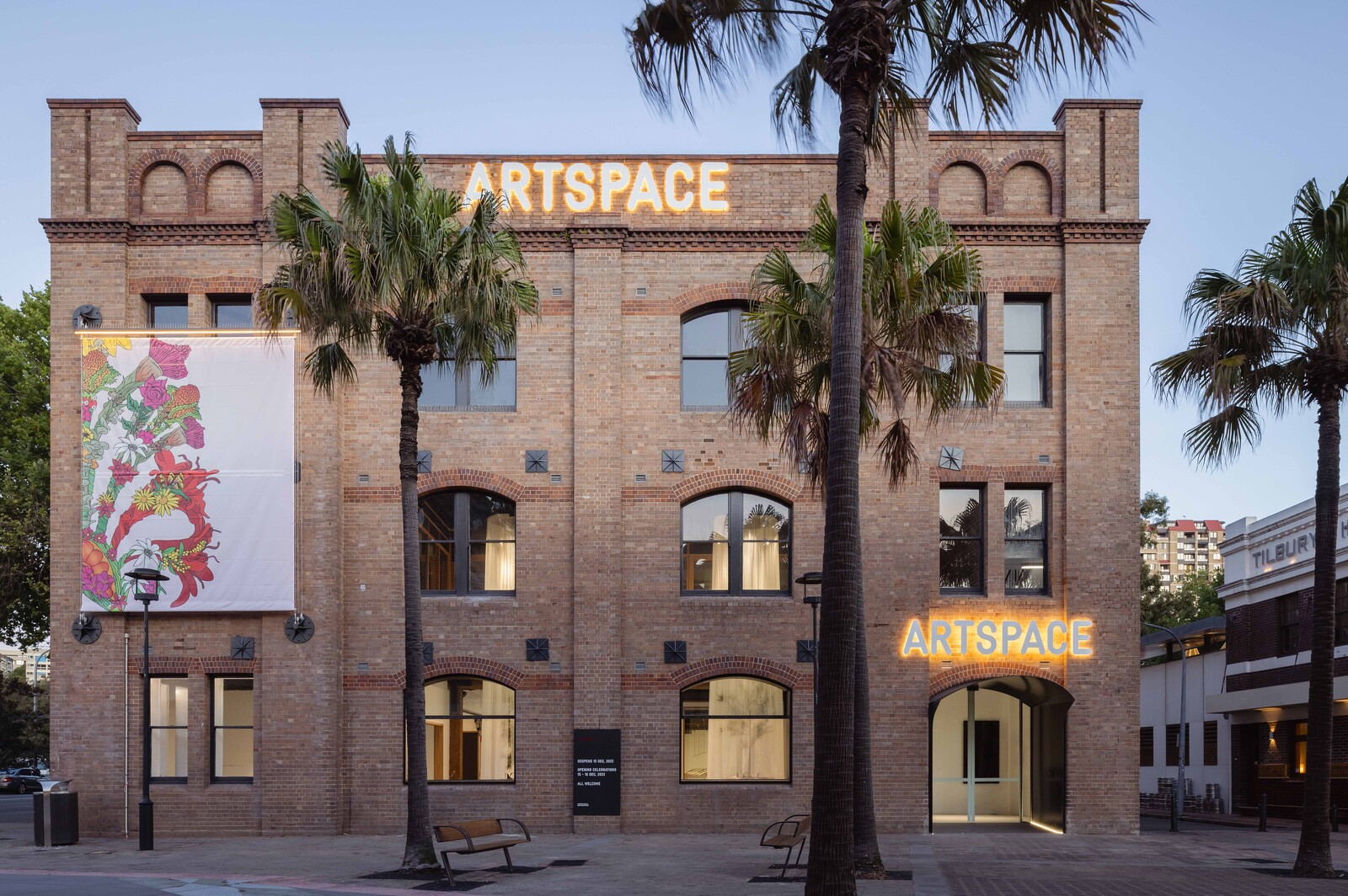
The Gunnery, 43-51 Cowper Wharf Road, Woolloomooloo

In 1992, Artspace relocated to its current location, The Gunnery, in Woolloomooloo. The now heritage listed site was originally erected as a bulk store for the Sydney Morning Herald at the turn of the 20th Century, and later used by the Commonwealth Government for defence purposes until its decommissioning in 1948. In the 1970s and early 1980s, the building was principally used as a squat by artists and as a space for studios, performances and exhibitions. In 1989, the NSW Government proposed to sell The Gunnery for redevelopment. Artists successfully protested this sale to the Land & Environment Court, keeping The Gunnery in the public eye and preventing its demolition. In 1991, the NSW Government proposed that the building become a centre for visual arts, with Artspace moving in to the space the following year.

In 2015, Artspace secured $150,000 funding to redevelop the ground floor of The Gunnery. This redevelopment funding also made way for an expanded artistic program including the Ideas Platform, Volume book fair, and the rent-free One Year Studio residencies for artists at all stages of their careers.

In 2021, Artspace began its transformation into a landmark multi-platform contemporary art centre with expanded exhibition spaces, increased artist studios and greater connections to Woolloomooloo, the East Sydney precinct and Sydney Harbour Foreshore. News of Artspace's redevelopment was announced by Minister for the Arts Don Harwin:

From a famed artist squat in the 70s and 80s, to the studio space, gallery and home to resident artist organisations in the early 90s, to the cultural landmark it is today, The Gunnery will be transformed once again to an exciting new cultural destination for the people of NSW ... For almost thirty years, Artspace has called The Gunnery home, playing a significant role in transforming the site to the premier cultural destination it is today. Through Artspace, The Gunnery will continue to be an inclusive place of gathering for communities anchored in Woolloomooloo.

The redevelopment moved the entrance of Artspace from Cowper Wharf Road to Forbes Street Plaza. The restoration of all three floors of The Gunnery resulted in expanded galleries, additional rent-free studios, and universal access throughout the building, and will include expanded exhibition space on the ground floor, while the first floor was upgraded to include spaces for education, outreach, digital broadcast, performance, production and public program space. Artspace reopened to the public in December 2023.

== Description and governance ==
Artspace is supported by the Visual Arts and Crafts Strategy, an initiative of the federal, state and territory governments. It is also assisted by the Government of New South Wales through Create NSW, and by Creative Australia. Artspace is a member of the advocacy organisation Contemporary Art Organisations Australia.

In 2013 Alexie Glass-Kantor was appointed executive director of Artspace. In 2025, Victor Wang was appointed executive director.

=== Past executive directors ===
- Victor Wang (2025–current)
- Alexie Glass-Kantor (2013–2024)
- Blair French (2006–13)
- Nicholas Tsoutas (1994–2005)
- Louise Pether (1992–94)
- Sally Couacaud (1988–1992)
- Gary Sangster (1984–87)
- Judy Annear (1982–83)

== Select exhibitions ==
- Koori Art 84, presented at Artspace in September 1984, was the first exhibition to focus on emerging Aboriginal artists, largely from an urban context. The exhibition featured Banduk Marika, Euphemia Bostock, Ian Craigie, Ernabella Arts Inc., Fiona Foley, Warrick Kenn, Fernanda Martins, Peter Mackenzie, Raymond J. Meeks, Murijama, Ida Nabanunka, Trevor Nickolls, Lin Onus, Avril Quail, Michael Riley, Wenton Rubuntja, Jeffrey Samuels, Andrew Saunders, Terry Shewring, Jim Simon Gordon Syron, Turkey Tolson Tjupurrula, and Johnny Warangula Tjupurrula.
- TWO WORLDS COLLIDE: Cultural Convergence in Aboriginal and White Australia Art was presented at Artspace in 1985, curated by Tim Johnson and with works by David Apden, Richard Goodwin, Tim Johnson, Banduk Marika, Charlie Marshall, Peter Myers, Daisy Leura Nakamarra, Entalura Nangala, Trevor Nickolls, Andrew Saunders, Narpula Scobie Napurrula, Terry Shewring, Jim Simon, Brendon Stewart, Imants Tillers, Mick Numeri Tjapaltjari, Turkey Tolson Tjupurulla, Cathleen Whiskey, William Sandy, and Maxie Tjampitjinpa.
- Frames of Reference: Aspects of Feminism and Art, 1991, was curated by Sally Couacaud with the following artists: Su Baker, Vivienne Binns, Pat Brassington, Julie Rrap, Barbara Campbell, Liz Coats, Rebecca Cummins, Elisabeth Day, Frances Joseph, Mikala Dwyer, Merilyn Fairskye, Anne Ferran, Anne Gaham, Ann Harris, Pat Hoffie, Noelle Janaczewska, Laleen Jayamanne, Lyndal Jones, Narelle Jubelin, Janet Laurence, Lindy Lee, Kate Lohse, Anne MacDonald, Leah MacKinnon, Hilarie Mais, Bette Mifsud, Margaret Morgan, Anne Mosey, Dolly Nampijinpa Daniels, Elizabeth Newman, Susan Norrie, Jill Orr, Lee Paterson, Jane Richens, Emma Rooney, Margot Rosser, Shiralee Saul, Jill Scott, Kathy Temin, Piki Verschueren, Judy Watson, and Ann Wulff.

== Programs ==
Opening in 1983, Artspace has supported the emerging and early-career artists and the presentation of contemporary and experimental art. Each year, Artspace presents between 24 and 30 gallery projects, hosts over 50 artist residencies, initiates a range of public program and education activities, and publishes a regular projects journal together with cultural theory books and artist monographs.

=== Biennale of Sydney ===
Artspace is a longstanding exhibition partner of the Biennale of Sydney, a partnership which started in 1992. The first artists shown at Artspace as part of the 9th Sydney Biennale were L. C. Armstrong (USA), Julia Morison (NZ), and Perejaume (Spain). Recent presentations of the Biennale at Artspace have included the works of Ai Weiwei, Ibrahim Mahama, Karen Mirza and Brad Butler.

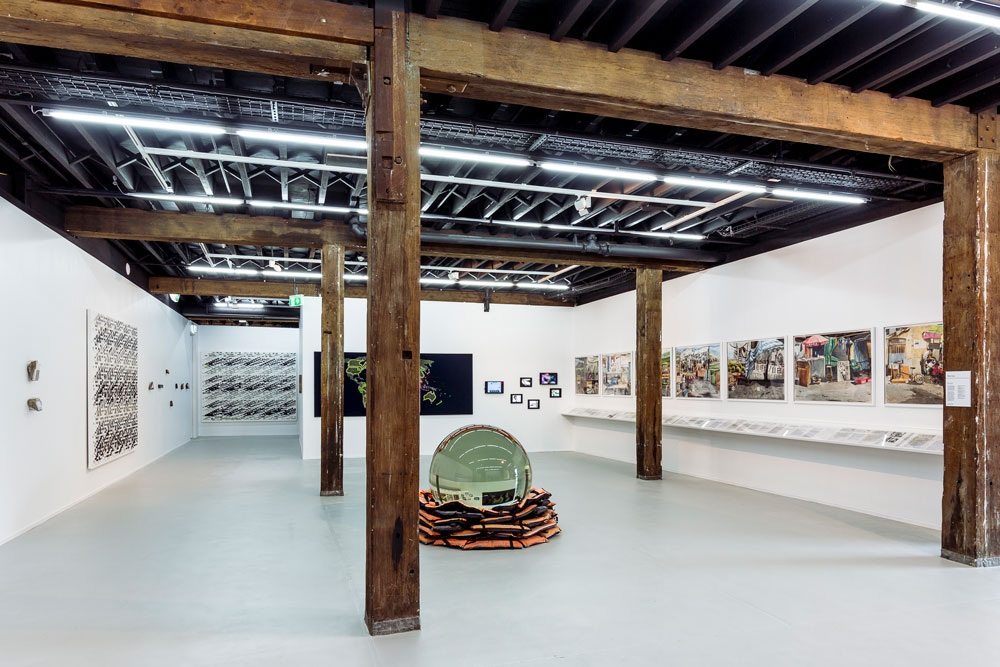
Installation view of the 21st Biennale of Sydney, 2018

The 23rd Biennale of Sydney, titled rīvus, was presented under the artistic direction of José Roca with Artspace curator Talia Linz forming the curatorium. Artspace presented works by Jumana Emil Abboud (Palestine/England), Dineo Seshee Bopape (South Africa), Boral River (Bangladesh), Carolina Caycedo (Colombia/USA), Erin Coates (Australia), Cian Dayrit (Philippines), Jessie French (Australia), Joey Holder (England), Pushpa Kumari (India), Latent Community (Albania/Greece), Martuwarra River (Australia), National Committee of the Friends of Myall Creek Memorial and local First Nations Communities (on Gamilaroi country, Australia), Wura-Natasha Ogunji (Nigeria/USA), Duke Riley (USA), and Teho Ropeyarn (Angkamuthi/Yadhaykana, Australia).

=== Touring exhibitions ===
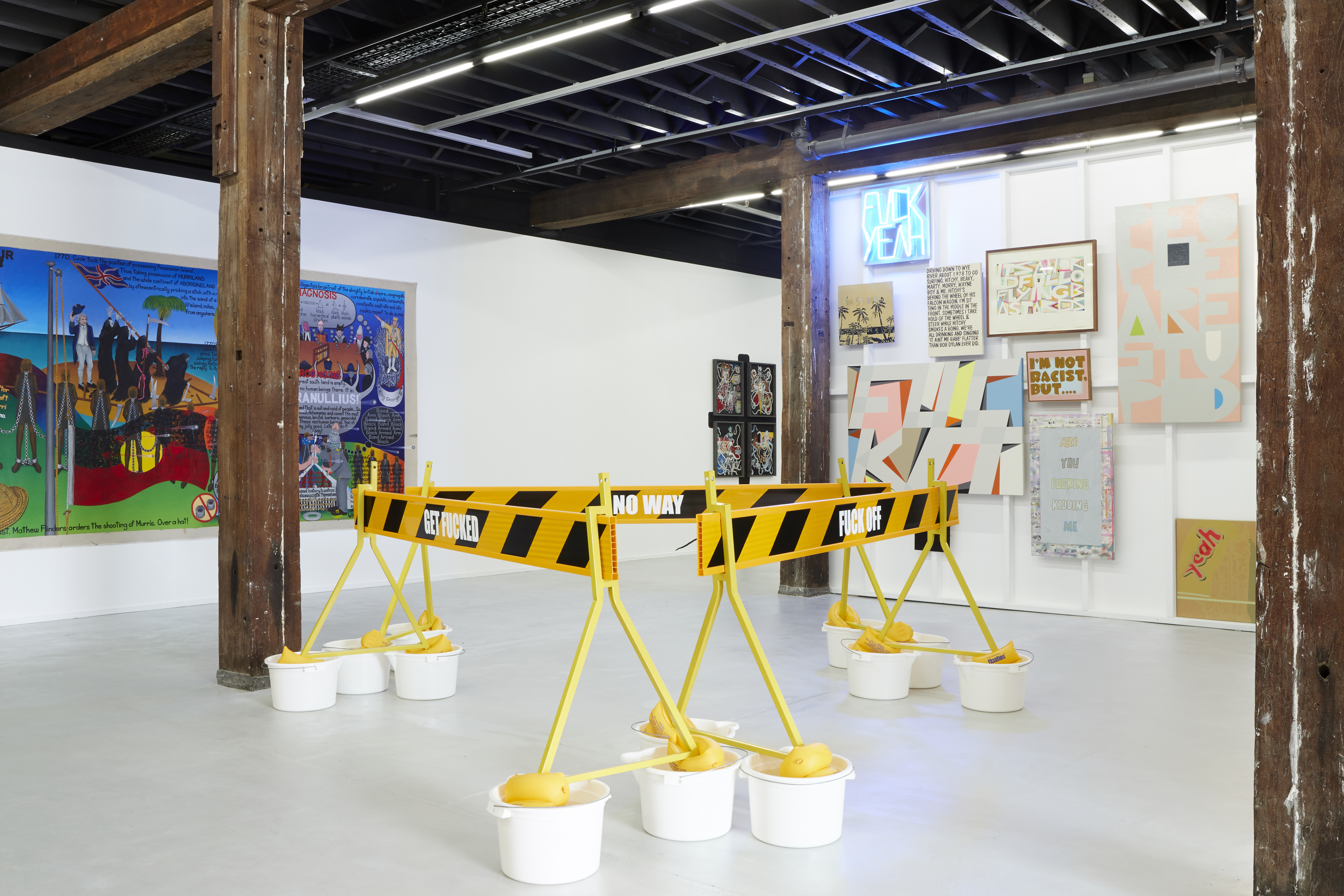
Installation view of Just Not Australian at Artspace, 2019

In addition to the presentation of exhibitions at The Gunnery, Artspace presents a multi-year national touring program in partnership with Museums & Galleries of NSW which reaches audiences across regional Australia. Regional locations at which Artspace has presented their touring program include Tweed Regional Gallery, Museum and Art Gallery of the Northern Territory, Casula Powerhouse Arts Centre, Newcastle Art Gallery, Lismore Regional Gallery, Wagga Wagga Art Gallery, Penrith Regional Gallery, Jervis Bay Maritime Museum, Wollongong Art Gallery, Bathurst Regional Art Gallery, Port Pirie Regional Art Gallery, Caboolture Regional Art Gallery, Museum of Sydney, and Western Plains Cultural Centre.

=== Studios ===
Since 2015, Artspace has provided rent-free studio residencies for artists of all career stages, one of the only institutions in Australia to do so. The One Year Studio Program offers ten rent-free studios annually space for experimentation and the development of new work. The Artspace studio residents are selected via an Open Call for applications each year, which are assessed by Artspace staff and Board Members, including Board artist representatives. The One Year Studio Program provides artists with the space to test new ideas and engage with Australian and international peer networks and audiences. The residency program also offers ongoing advocacy and curatorial dialogue which positively impacts longevity and vitality of artists’ careers.

==== 2024 One Year Studio Residents ====
- Brian Fuata
- David M Thomas
- Gemma Smith
- Jack Ball
- Jazz Money
- Julia Gutman
- Latai Taumoepeau
- Leyla Stevens
- Thea Anamara Perkins
- Tina Havelock Stevens

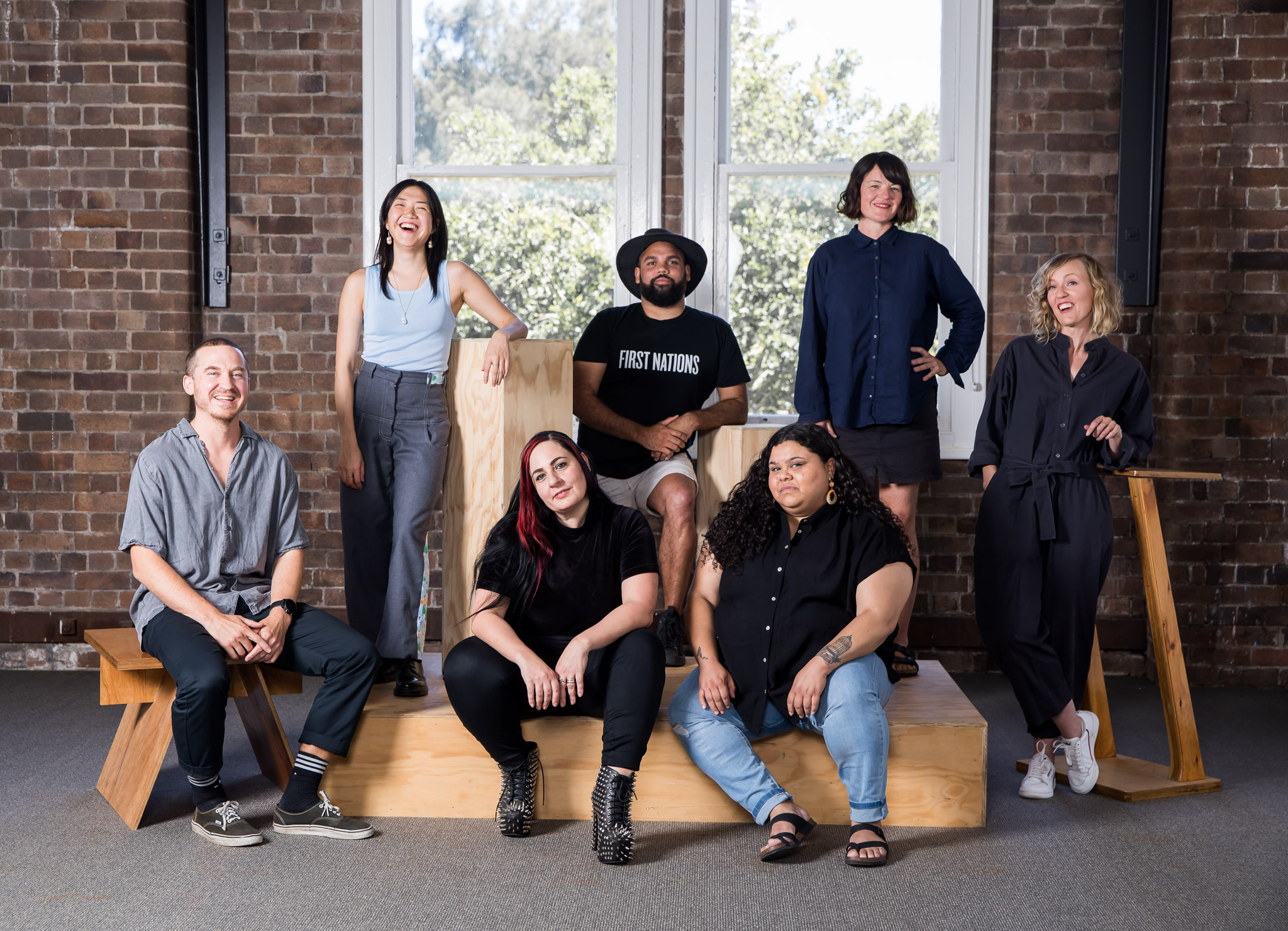
2020 One Year Studio Artists

==== Previous One Year Studio Residents ====
===== 2020 =====
- The Re-Right Collective (Dennis Golding and Carmen Glynn-Braun)
- Rainbow Chan
- Marion Abboud
- Seth Birchall
- Rochelle Haley
- Fiona Lowry
- TV Moore

===== 2019 =====
- Lauren Brincat
- Abdullah Syed Muhammad Iyhab
- Chris Dolman
- Jelena Telecki
- Club Ate (Bhenji Ra and Justin Shoulder)
- Salote Tawale
- Marian Tubbs

===== 2018 =====
- Snack Syndicate (Astrid Lorange and Andrew Brooks)
- Cybele Cox
- David Griggs
- Elizabeth Pulie
- Eugen Choi
- Heath Franco
- Matthew Griffin

===== 2017 =====
- Agatha Gothe Snape
- Justene Williams
- Keg de Souza
- Bianca Hester
- Karen Black
- Mason Kimber
- Tom Polo

===== 2016 =====
- Benjamin Forster
- Brown Council (Frances Barrett, Kate Blackmore, Diane Smith, Kelly Doley)
- Hossein Ghaemi
- Nell
- Koji Ryui
- Raquel Ormella
- Khaled Sabsabi

===== 2015 =====
- Khadim Ali
- Hany Armanious
- Kelly Doley
- Nick Dorey
- Mikala Dwyer
- Claire Milledge
- Tim Silver

=== 52 artists 52 actions ===
Conceived in 2018, the initial iteration of 52 ARTISTS 52 ACTIONS engaged one artist or collective per week to stage actions in unique physical locations in the Asia-Pacific region. The second iteration of the project took place entirely online between 2021 and 2021 in response to the pandemic. Since 2022, 52 ARTISTS 52 ACTIONS has toured around Australia with works by the initial 52 artists and collectives.

=== VOLUME ===
Artspace presents VOLUME, a biennial international book fair in partnership with Printed Matter, Inc, New York and Perimeter Books, Melbourne. The 2017 iteration included 70 international exhibitors including those from Australia, The Netherlands, Amsterdam, Hong Kong, South Korea, Colombia, France, and the United States. It also featured a program of talks, artist-led workshops, book launches, readings and performances.

=== International Visiting Curators Program ===
Artspace hosts the International Visiting Curators Program which aims to connect Australian artists with international networks through collaborative partnerships and international cultural exchange. International practitioners who have been presented in the program include Diana Campbell Betancourt, Asad Raza, Pavel S. Pyś, Laura Raicovich, Radhika Subramaniam and Susanne Pfeffer.

== NSW Visual Arts Emerging Fellowship ==
The New South Wales Travelling Art Scholarship was established in 1900. In 1939 Sydney artist Lance Solomon won the award, with his work North West 1939.

In 1997 the award was renamed the Helen Lempriere Travelling Art Scholarship, when it received funding from the Helen Lempriere Bequest, which had been established under the will of artist Helen Lempriere's husband, Keith Wood (who died in 1995). It was presented by the NSW Government, providings financial assistance for an early career visual artist to undertake a program of professional development either internationally or (since 2010) in Australia.

From 2012, it was replaced by the NSW Visual Arts Emerging Fellowship. Artspace presents the NSW Visual Arts Emerging Fellowship in association annually with the NSW Government through Create NSW. This prestigious $30,000 fellowship provides a New South Wales-based visual arts practitioner in the early stages of their career the opportunity to undertake a program of significant professional development and career advancement. While Artspace's premises have been under redevelopment, the fellowship has been presented in tandem with fellow Sydney institutions the National Art School and Carriageworks. Before 2012, the fellowship was known as the Helen Lempriere Travelling Art Scholarship.

=== New South Wales Travelling Art Scholarship recipients ===
- 1939: Lance Solomon

=== Helen Lempriere Travelling Art Scholarship recipients ===
- 2011 – Soda Jerk
- 2010 – Khaled Sabsabi
- 2009 – Lauren Brincat
- 2008 – Diego Bonetto
- 2007 – Sam Smith
- 2006 – Todd McMillan
- 2005 – Ms & Mr (Richard and Stephanie nova Milne)
- 2004 – Kate Murphy
- 2003 – Sean Cordeiro and Claire Healy
- 2002 – Benjiman Denham
- 2001 – Monika Tichacek
- 2000 – Katthy Cavaliere
- 1999 – Maria Ionico
- 1998 – Tony Schwensen
- 1997 – Lin Li

A travelling exhibition featuring six past winners of the Helen Lempriere Travelling Art Scholarship, How Yesterday Remembers Tomorrow, toured New South Wales in 2012. It featured the work of Lauren Brincat, Claire Healy and Sean Cordeiro, Todd McMillan, Ms&Mr, Tony Schwensen, and Sam Smith.

=== NSW Visual Arts Emerging Fellowship recipients ===
- 2023 – Morgan Hogg
- 2022 – Eddie Abd
- 2020 – Dennis Golding
- 2019 – Shivanjani Lal
- 2018 – EO Gill
- 2017 – Claudia Nicholson
- 2016 – Consuelo Cavaniglia
- 2015 – Heath Franco
- 2014 – Ramesh Mario Nithiyendran
- 2013 – Jamie North
