= Mikala Dwyer =

Australian sculptor (born 1959)

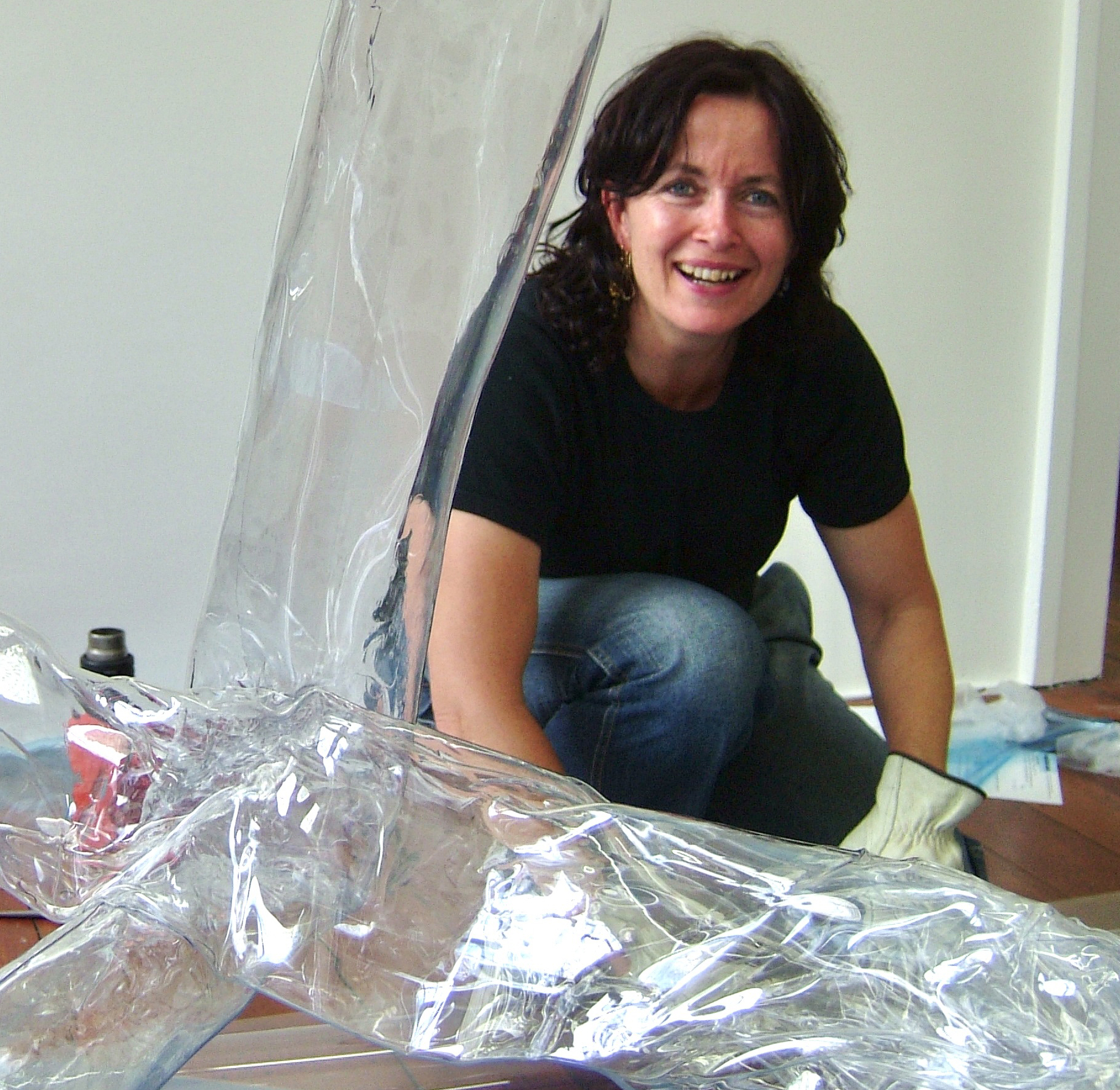
- Mikala Dwyer, 2005
- Born: 1959 (age 66–67); Sydney
- Education: University of Sydney; Middlesex University; University of New South Wales; Professor Stan Douglas, Berlin University of the Arts
- Known for: Sculpture and installation art
- Movement: Contemporary art
- Website: mikaladwyer.com

Mikala Dwyer is an Australian artist born in 1959 in Sydney. She is a contemporary sculptor who was shortlisted with fellow artist Justene Williams to represent Australia at the 2019 Venice Biennale.

== Education ==
In 1983, Mikala Dwyer attended the University of Sydney and in 1986 received a Bachelor of Fine Art. Dwyer also spent time at the Middlesex University from 1985 to 1986 in the United Kingdom. In 2000, Dwyer earned her Masters of Fine Art at the University of New South Wales, College of Fine Art. Dwyer also trained under Professor Stan Douglas at Berlin University of the Arts from 2005 to 2007.

== Career ==
Dwyer has been producing work for exhibition since the early 1980s, developing a career in installation and sculptural work. Her practice deals with the spiritual, magic, rituals, the occult, alchemy and the "other". Dwyer's practice can be described as "playful and fanatical" as she invites the audience to participate with her works and draw their own conclusions. Dwyer is known for her use of everyday materials such as plastics, metal, wood, fabric, paint, plants and other found objects.

In 1992 Dwyer was amount the first group of young Australian artists selected to have their work exhibited in the first Primavera exhibition, held at the Museum of Contemporary Art Australia. Curated by Linda Michael, the exhibition included James Angus, Dwyer, Gale Hastings, and Constance Zikos. In 2000 Dwyer had a major solo exhibition at the Museum of Contemporary Art Australia. The exhibition included the recent works from Dwyer's practice as well as site specific pieces tailored to interact with the gallery space. In 2010 Dwyer created an installation titled Square Cloud Compound on Cockatoo Island for the Biennale of Sydney. Dwyer's work deals with the island's ominous history in a playful manner. In 2016 Dwyer was awarded a National Association for the Visual Arts Visual and Fellowship grant, which was funded by the Copyright Agency's Cultural Fund. In 2017 Dwyer had another major solo exhibition held at the Art Gallery of New South Wales titled A Shape of Thought. The exhibition explored Dwyer's investigation of "the consciousness and liveliness of matter surrounding us" and was composed of current artworks which included Square Cloud Compound (2010), The letterbox Marys (2015–17), and The silvering (2017). In 2018 Dwyer and Justene Williams, with curators Susan Best and Ann Stephen, were shortlisted to represent Australia at the 2019 Venice Biennale. Although their proposal was not selected, it was later remodelled into "Mondspiel" part of the Bauhaus Now exhibition. In 2019 Ann Stephen curated Bauhaus Now, an exhibition that was held at the Buxton Contemporary, Melbourne for the 100th anniversary celebration of the Bauhaus. Mikala Dwyer and Justene Williams collaborated to create installations focusing on the "Bauhaus legacy in Australia".

Dwyer has lectured at Sydney College of Art, the University of Sydney, as well as being an associate professor at RMIT University, Melbourne City Campus.

Dwyer has work in the following collections: the Cruthers Collection of Women's Art, University of Western Australia; National Gallery of Australia, Canberra; University of New South Wales, Sydney; Museum of Contemporary Art Australia, Sydney; UQ Art Gallery, University of Queensland, Brisbane; Heide Museum of Modern Art, Melbourne; National Gallery of Victoria, Melbourne; Monash University Museum of Art, Melbourne; Museum of Old and New Art, Hobart; Auckland City Gallery, New Zealand.

== Solo exhibitions ==
- In the Manger, Chapel of Love, Sydney, 1982
- Drunheart, performance, ANZART, Old Mail Exchange, Hobart, 1983
- Poor Bare Forked Animal (with Mary Rose Sinn), Chelsea College of Art, London, 1985
- Becalmed, City Artists Gallery, London, 1986
- Untitled Installation, First Draft, Sydney, 1987
- Boot, KSK Gallery, Sydney, 1988
- Untitled Installation, 338 Gallery, Sydney, 1988
- Untitled Installation, Window Gallery, Sydney, 1989
- Ringing, First Draft, Sydney, 1989
- Wall to Wall: Ceiling to Floor, 200 Gertrude Street, Melbourne, 1990
- Untitled Installation, First Draft West, Sydney, 1990
- Untitled Installation, First Draft West, Sydney, 1991
- Untitled Installation, 200 Gertrude Street, Melbourne, 1991
- Untitled Installation, BLACK, Sydney, 1992
- Henle's Loop, Institute of Modern Art, Brisbane, 1993
- Whoops, Sarah Cottier Gallery, Sydney, 1994
- Jean's OK, Regents Court Hotel, Sydney, 1994
- Collaboration With Gale Hastings, CBD Gallery, Sydney 1994
- Sad Songs, Artspace, Sydney, 1995
- Voodoo Lambchop, Teststrip, Auckland, 1995
- Vincent (Aires), Dunedin Public Art Gallery, Dunedin, 1995
- Nail-Polish Paintings, Hamish McKay Gallery, Wellington, 1995
- Recent Old Work, Sarah Cottier Gallery, Sydney, 1996
- New Work, Hamish McKay Gallery, Wellington, 1996
- Tubeweight, CBD Gallery, Sydney, 1996
- Hollowware and a Few Solids, Australian Centre of Contemporary Art, Melbourne, 1996
- I.O.U, CBD Gallery, Sydney, 1998
- Addon (Clothing Plan) (Closing Plan), Hamish McKay Gallery, Wellington, 1998
- A Work by Mikala Dwyer Done in Someone Else's Studio, Fortitude Valley, Brisbane, 1998
- Uniform, Sarah Cottier Gallery, Sydney, 1999
- Mikala Dwyer Solo Exhibition, Museum of Contemporary Art, Sydney 2000
- Indifinity Maybe; I Care Because You Do; The Loozer Planet; Sweetpotatosexpet Antenna; Hanging Eyes; I.O.U (a tile); My Home is Your Home; Floating Old Man; Selfshel, Chapel Art Centre, Cardiff, 2000
- Iffytown, Hamish McKay Gallery, Wellington, 2000
- Mikala Dwyer, Sarah Cottier Gallery, Sydney, 2001
- Mikala Dwyer, Hamish McKay Gallery, Wellington, 2001
- Art Lifts, National Gallery of Australia, Canberra, 2002
- Flowers, Flies and Someone Else, Anna Schwartz Gallery, Melbourne, 2004
- Some More Recent Old Work, Darren Knight Gallery, Sydney, 2004
- I Maybe We, Museum of New Zealand Te Papa Tongarewa, Wellington, 2005
- The Addition and Subtractions; The Hanging Garden, Kunstraum, Potsdam, 2007
- Moon Garden, Aratoi Museum, Masterton, 2008
- Costumes and Empty Sculptures, Institute of Modern Art, Brisbane, 2008
- Outfield, Roslyn Oxley9 Gallery, Sydney, 2009
- Square Cloud Compound, Biennale of Sydney, Sydney, 2010
- Square Cloud Compound, Hamish Morrison Gallery, Berlin, 2010
- Swamp Geometry, Anna Schwartz Gallery, Melbourne, 2011
- The Silvering, Anna Schwartz Gallery, Melbourne, 2011
- Drawing Down the Moon, Institute of Modern Art, Brisbane, 2012
- Panto Collapsar, Arts Project, Berlin, 2012
- Divinations for the Real Things, Roslyn Oxley9 Gallery, Sydney, 2012
- Goldene Bend're, Australian Centre for Contemporary Art, Melbourne, 2013
- Hollowwork, Anna Schwartz Gallery, Melbourne, 2014
- The Garden of Half Life, University Art Gallery, The University of Sydney, Sydney, 2014
- Pantocollapsar, Mermaid Arts Centre, Bray, Ireland, 2014
- Underfall, Mildura Arts Centre, Mildura, 2014
- The letterbox Marys, Roslyn Oxley9 Gallery, Sydney, 2015
- Mikala Dwyer: MCA Collection, Curated by Natasha Bullock, Museum of Contemporary Art, Sydney, 2015
- In the Head of Humans, Hopkinson Mossman, Auckland, 2016
- Square Cloud Compound, Museum of Contemporary Art, Sydney, 2016
- A Shape of Thought, Art Gallery of New South Wales, Sydney, 2017
- Soft Relics, Roslyn Oxley9 Gallery, Sydney, 2018

== Select group exhibitions ==
- APMIRA Land Rights Exhibition, Paddington Town Hall, Sydney, 1982
- ANZART (performance in Hardened Arteries), Old Mail Exchange, Hobart, 1983
- Certain Versions, City Artist Gallery, London, 1986
- Eevy, Ivy, Over, with Belinda Holland, First Draft, Sydney, 1988
- Exploring Drawing, Ivan Dougherty Gallery, Sydney, 1989
- Fresh Art, S.H. Irvin Gallery, Sydney 1989
- Installed and Temporal Work, Tin Shed, Sydney, 1990
- Disonnance: Frames of Reference, Pier 4/5, Sydney, 1991
- Discrete Entity, Canberra School of Art Gallery, Canberra, 1991
- Primavera, Museum of Contemporary Art, Sydney, 1992
- Wish Hard, 9th Biennale of Sydney, Wollongong City Gallery, Sydney, 1992
- Australian Perspecta, Art Gallery of New South Wales, Sydney, 1993
- Purl, The Fifth Melbourne Sculpture Triennial, West Melbourne Primary School, Melbourne DEcor, Pepper Bistro, Canberra, 1993
- Monster Field, Ivan Dougherty Gallery, Sydney, 1993
- Shirthead, Mori Annexe, Sydney, 1993
- True Stories, Artspace, Sydney, 1994
- The Aberrant Object: Women Dada and Surrealism, Heide Museum of Modern Art, Melbourne, 1994
- Aussemblage, Auckland City Gallery, Auckland, 1994
- OrientATION, 4th International Istanbul Biennale, Istanbul, 1995
- A Night at the Show, Field, Zurich, Switzerland, 1995
- De Huid van der Whitte Dame (The White Lady's Skin), Eindhoven, The Netherlands, 1995
- The Believers: Mikala Dwyer, Maria Cruz, Anne OOms, CBD Gallery, Sydney; Artspace Gallery, Auckland, 1997
- Object and Ideas – revisiting minimalism, Museum of Contemporary Art, Sydney, 1997
- Body Suits, Perth Institute of Contemporary Arts, Perth, 1998
- The Infinite Space: Women, Minimalism and the Sculptural Objects, Ian Potter Museum of Art, National Gallery of Victoria, Melbourne, 1998
- Close Quarters: Contemporary Art from Australia and New Zealand, Australian Centre for Contemporary Art, Monash University, Melbourne; Canberra school of Art, Govett Brewster Art Gallery, New Plymouth, 1998
- Beauty 2000, Institute of Modern Art, Brisbane, 1998
- Contempora5, Ian Potter Museum of Art, National Gallery of Victoria Australia, Melbourne, 1999
- Avant-Gardism for Children, University of Queensland, Brisbane; Monash University Gallery, Melbourne, 1999
- Brainland – The Believers: Mikala Dwyer, Maria Cruz, Anne Ooms, Art Gallery of New South Wales, Sydney, 1999
- 9 Lives, Casula Powerhouse, Sydney, 1999
- Nostalgia for the Future, Artspace, Auckland, 1999
- Monochromes, University Art Museum, University of Queensland, Brisbane, 2000
- Plastika, Govett-Brewster Art Gallery, Auckland, 2000
- Bonheurs des Antipodes, Musee de Picardie, Amiens, 2000
- Verso Süd, Palazzo Doria Pamphiji, Rome, 2000
- Artful Park, Centennial Park, Sydney, 2001
- Unnecessary Invention, Artspace, Sydney, 2001
- Fieldwork: Australian Art 1968–2002, Ian Potter Museum of Art, National Gallery of Victoria, Melbourne, 2002
- Helen Lempriere National Sculpture Award, Werribbe Park, Melbourne, 2002
- Face Up: Contemporary Art from Australia, Nationalgalerie im Hamburger Bahnhoff, Berlin, 2003
- This was the Future... Australian Sculpture of the 1950s, 60s, 70s + Today, Heide Museum of Modern Art, Melbourne, 2003
- Still Life, Art Gallery of New South Wales, Sydney, 2003
- The Shangri-La Collective, Artspace, Sydney, 2003
- Pegging Out, Hazelhurst Regional Gallery & Art Centre, Gymea, 2004
- Three-way Abstraction: Works of the Monash University Collection, Monash University Museum of Art, Melbourne, 2004
- The Wallflower, Canberra Contemporary Art Space, Canberra, 2005
- National Sculpture Prize and Exhibition 2005, National Gallery of Australia, Canberra, 2005
- Unscripted: Language in Contemporary Art, Art Gallery of New South Wales, Sydney, 2005
- High Tide, Zacheta National Gallery, Warsaw, touring CAC, Vilnius, Lithuania, 2006
- Beckon, Perth Institute of Contemporary Art, Perth, 2006
- Out of Context, OMI Sculpture Park, New York City, 2006
- 21st Century Modern: 2006 Adelaide Biennial of Australian Art, Art Gallery of South Australia, Nada Art Fair, Miami, 2006
- Von Riots Zu Angels, NYRT, Berlin, 2007
- Truths, Auckland Art Gallery, Auckland, 2007
- Den Haag Sculptuur 2007 De Overkant / Down Under, The Netherlands, 2007
- Bal Tashchit: Thou Shalt Not Destroy, Jewish Museum, Melbourne, 2008
- Lost and Found: An Archaeology of the Present, TarraWarra Biennal, TarraWarra Museum of Art, Victoria, 2008
- Common Space, Private Space, Margaret Lawrence Gallery, Victorian College of the Arts, Melbourne, 2008
- Come-In: Interior Design as a Contemporary Art Medium in Germany, RMIT Gallery, Melbourne, 2008
- Axis Bold as Love Video Salon, CAPC Bordeaux, 2008
- To Make a Work Of Timeless Art, Museum of Contemporary Art, Sydney, 2008
- Zeigen. An Audio Tour through Berlin, with Karin Sander, Temporare Kunsthalle, Berlin, 2009
- Mirror Mirror, then and now, Institute of Modern Art, Brisbane; University Art Gallery, Verge Gallery and Tin Sheds Gallery, Sydney; Samstag Museum of Art, Adelaide, 2009
- The Beauty of Distance: Songs of Survival in a Precarious Age the 17th Biennale of Sydney, Alterbeast, Super Deluxe, Artspace, in The Beauty of Distance: Songs of Survival in a Precarious Age the 17th Biennale of Sydney, 2010
- Alterbeast, Gertrude Contemporary Art Spaces, Melbourne, 2010
- Before and After Science, 2010 Biennial of Australian Art, Adelaide, 2010
- Ich Wicht, Kunstraum, Potsdam, 2010
- Captain Thunderbolt's Sisters, with Justene Williams, Cockatoo Island Artists in Residence Programme, Sydney, 2010
- To Give Time to Time, with Natural Selection Theory, Australian Experimental Art Foundation, Adelaide, 2010
- Colour Baazar, Heide Museum of Modern Art, Melbourne, 2011
- NETWORKS (cells & silos), Monash University Museum of Art, Melbourne, 2011
- Alterbeast, Penrith Regional Museum, Penrith, Australia, 2011
- Monanism, Museum of Old and New Art, Hobart, 2011
- Plus ou Moins Sorcières 2/3: Epreuves Ritulisées, Maison Populaire, Paris, 2012
- Less is More, Heide Museum of Modern Art, Melbourne, 2012
- Das Ende des 20. Jahrhunderts. Es Kommt Noch Besser: Ein Dialog mit der Sammlung Marx, Hamburger Bahnhof, Berlin, 2013
- Light Sweet Crude, Hopkinson Mossman Gallery, Auckland, 2013
- Schwarz//Weiss, Hamish Morrison Gallery, Berlin, 2013
- Primavera 2014 (curator) Museum of Contemporary Art, Sydney, 2014
- The Cinemas Project: Exploring The Spectral Spaces of Cinema, Mildura Arts Centre, Melbourne, 2014
- From a Near Future, SCA Gallery, Sydney College of the Arts, University of Sydney, Sydney, 2014
- De Rerum Natura, Studio La Citta, Verona, Italy, 2014
- You Imagine What You Desire, curated by Juliana Engburg, 19th Biennale of Sydney, Cockatoo Island, Sydney, 2014
- Future Primitive, Heide Museum of Modern Art, Melbourne, 2014
- Dead Ringer, Perth Institute of Contemporary Art, Perth, 2015
- Antropia, curated by Marco Meneguzzo, Eduardo Secci Contemporary, Florence, 2015
- Hall of Half-Life, Strierischer Herbst Festival, GrazMuseum, Graz, 2015
- Saint Judes's Leftovers (Your Thoughts in Lights), Stierischer Herbst Festival, Vordernberg, 2015
- Believe not every spirit, but try the spirits, Monash University Museum of Art, Melbourne, 2015
- Hiding in Plain Sight: A selection of works from the Michael Buxton Collection, Bendigo Art Gallery, Victoria, 2015
- Neverwhere, curated by Vikki McInnes, Gaia Gallery, Istanbul, 2015
- MAGNETISM, Hazelwood, Sligo, 2015
- Deeply Highly Eccentric, Winchester Gallery, Winchester School of Art, Hampshire, 2015
- Glazed and Confused, Hazelhurst Regional Gallery, Sydney, 2015
- Square Cloud Compound, Encounters, curated by Alexie Glass-Kantor, Art Basel Hong Kong, Hong Kong, 2015
- Redlands Konica Minolta ArtPrize, curated by Tim Johnson, National Art School Gallery, Sydney, 2015
- Primavera at 25: MCA Collection, Museum of Contemporary Art, Sydney, 2016
- Quicksilver, Anne & Gordon Samstag Museum of Art, University of South Australia, Adelaide, 2016
- Soft Core, curated by Michael Do, Casula Powerhouse Arts Centre, Sydney, 2016
- Erewhon, curated by Vikki McInnes, Margaret Lawrence Gallery, Victoria College of the Arts, Melbourne, 2016
- Wonder, curated by Carrie Kibbler, Hazelhurst Regional Gallery, Sydney, 2016
- Riddle of the Burial Grounds, curated by Tessa Giblan, Extra City Kunsthal, Antwerp, 2016
- Fabrik, Ian Potter Museum of Art, Melbourne, 2016
- Dämmerschlaf, Artspace, Sydney, 2016
- Soft Core, Lake Macquarie City Art Gallery, Booragul; Hawksbury Regional Art Gallery, Windsor, 2017
- Occulture: The Dark Arts, City Gallery, Wellington, 2017
- Every Brilliant Eye: Australian Art of the 1990s, National Gallery of Victoria, Melbourne, 2017
- Triple Point of Matter, Foundation Fiminco, Paris, 2017
- Unpainting, Art Gallery of South Gallery, Sydney, 2017
- Occulture: The Dark Arts, City Gallery, Wellington, 2017
- Blessed Be: Mysticism, Spirituality, and the Occult in Contemporary Art, curated by Ginger Shulick, Museum of Contemporary Art, Tucson, 2018
- The shape of things to come, Buxton Contemporary, Melbourne Soft Core, Shepparton Art Museum, Shepparton, 2018
- Second Sight: Witchcraft, Ritual, Power, The University of Queensland Art Museum, Brisbane, 2019
- Bauhaus Now, curated by Ann Stephen, Buxton Contemporary, Melbourne, 2019
