= Lemprière =

Lemprière is both a surname and a given name originating in Jersey. Notable people with the name include:

- Clement Lemprière (1683–1746), artist, military draughtsman and cartographer
- Cyril Lemprière, English rugby league footballer
- Arthur Reid Lempriere (1835–1927), British soldier and surveyor
- Geoffrey Lemprière (1904–1977), Australian woolbuyer
- Helen Lempriere (1907–1991), Australian artist
- John Lemprière (circa 1765–1824), English classical scholar, lexicographer, theologian, teacher and headmaster
- Saffron Lempriere (born 1992), English television personality
- Thomas Lempriere (1796–1852), British administrator, diarist and artist in Van Diemen's Land

Given name

- Lemprière Durell Hammond (1881–1965), Anglican bishop
