= Victor Wang =

Victor Wang may be:

- Victor Wang (artist) (born 1956), Chinese-American realist painter
- Victor Wang (curator), Canadian-born art curator
