= Helen Lempriere =

Australian artist and sculptor (1907–1991)

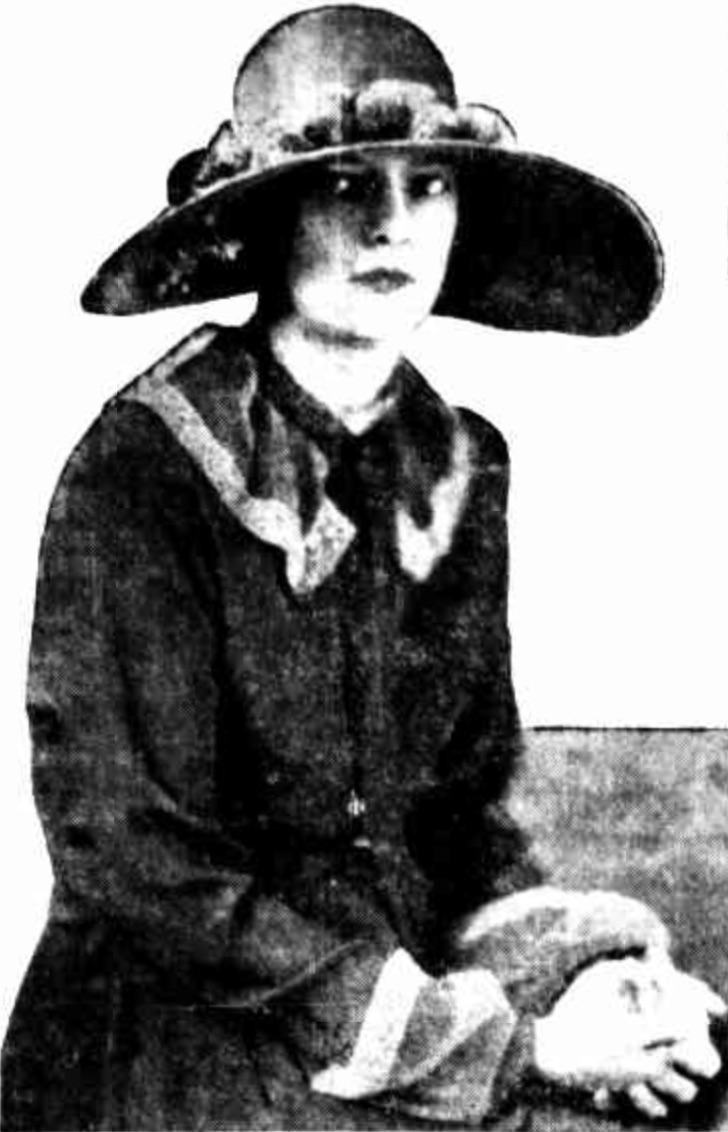
- Lempriere in 1926
- Born: Helen Dora Lempriere; 12 December 1907; Malvern, Victoria, Australia
- Died: 5 November 1991 (aged 83); Mona Vale, New South Wales, Australia
- Memorials: Helen Lempriere National Sculpture Award; Helen Lempriere Travelling Art Scholarship

Helen Dora Lempriere (12 December 1907 – 5 November 1991) was an Australian painter, sculptor and printmaker. She is particularly known for incorporating pictorial motifs, beliefs, and Aboriginal myths into her artworks.

== Early life and education ==
Born in the Melbourne suburb of Malvern on 12 December 1907, Helen Dora Lempriere was the only child of Charles Algernon Lempriere (uncle of businessman Geoffrey Lemprière) and Dora Elizabeth Octavia, née Mitchell (daughter of builder David Mitchell and younger sister of singer Nellie Melba).

Helen Lempriere grew up in a very privileged environment, which provided her with financial stability throughout her life. Her family was also very supportive of the arts: the Lempriere family, especially Dora Lempriere, took on a patron role with local artists, particularly through commissioning portraits.

She was educated at Toorak Ladies' College (1925) and then received tuition in art first from A. D. Colquhoun and later from Justus Jorgensen, two painters belonging to the Australian tonalism movement.

== Career ==
Lempriere helped Justus Jorgensen to establish Montsalvat, an artists' colony near Melbourne dedicated to artistic freedom.

Conception totenism, a 1956 painting employing Aboriginal themes, is held in the Art Gallery of New South Wales. Other similar paintings and also prints donated by her husband after her death are in the collection of National Gallery of Australia and in the Grainger Museum at the University of Melbourne.

== Personal life ==
Lempriere moved to Montsalvat in 1935 and stayed there until 1945, when she married Keith Wood.

She lived in Europe from 1950 to 1966.

== Death and legacy ==
Lempriere died on 5 November 1991.

The New South Wales Travelling Art Scholarship, established in 1900, was renamed the Helen Lempriere Travelling Art Scholarship in 1997, when it received funding from the Helen Lempriere Bequest, which had been established under the will of Lempriere's husband, Keith Wood (who died in 1995). It was presented by the New South Wales Government, and provides financial assistance for an early career visual artist to undertake a program of professional development either internationally or (since 2010) in Australia. Khaled Sabsabi won the scholarship in 2010. A travelling exhibition featuring six past winners, How Yesterday Remembers Tomorrow, toured New South Wales in 2012. It featured the work of Lauren Brincat, Claire Healy and Sean Cordeiro, Todd McMillan, Ms&Mr, Tony Schwensen, and Sam Smith. The award was replaced by the NSW Visual Arts Emerging Fellowship in 2012.

The Helen Lempriere National Sculpture Award was also established in her name, awarded from 2000 until 2008.
