= Institute of Modern Art =

Art gallery in Brisbane

The Institute of Modern Art (IMA) is a public art gallery located in the Judith Wright Arts Centre in the Brisbane inner-city suburb of Fortitude Valley, which features contemporary artworks and showcases emerging artists in a series of group and solo exhibitions. Founded in 1975, the gallery does not house a permanent collection, but also publishes research, exhibition catalogues and other monographs. Robert Leonard has been the director of the gallery since 2023, having previously been director between 2006 and 2013.

== History ==
The IMA was founded in 1975 as a public contemporary art, temporary exhibition space, which does not house a collection. It has published many artist monographs, as well as art theory and history texts, such as Sue Cramer's 1989 consideration of the appropriation of Aboriginal imagery, a key text in which various art critics and artists addressed the contested aesthetic and ethical issues surrounding the practice of cultural appropriation.

The Institute was supportive of anti-establishment positions; in June 1990, in protest against inflation of international art, the then director Nick Tsoutas staged The Bigger than Ben Hur Art Prices Auction there a couple of weeks ago, for which 35 local artists produced *an original reproduction of an original Renoir or Van Gogh", with the product auctioned for the benefit of the IMA.

In 2001 the IMA became Resident Cultural Organisation in the Judith Wright Centre of Contemporary Arts, and in 2006 was Queensland's largest contemporary art space.

In 2014 the Berlin-based Studio Miessen refurbished all the public areas, and in the same year the organisation appointed a new, internationally-focused advisory committee comprising Maria Lind of Stockholm's Tensta Konsthall, Nikos Papastergiadis of the University of Melbourne and New Delhi-based art group Raqs Media Collective.

In June 2021, IMA held its annual gala and benefit art auction at the Calile Hotel. Honouring artists Jenny Watson and Laurie Nilsen, the event both exhibited works of contemporary art as well as put a selection of works under the auctioneer's hammer, including works by Australian artists Vernon Ah Kee, Khadim Ali, Mikala Dwyer, Yhonnie Scarce, Judy Watson, Richard Bell, Dale Harding, Daniel Boyd and Tracey Moffatt, and major international artists Marina Abramović, Heman Chong, Marianna Simnett and Yvonne Todd.

== Governance and funding ==
The IMA is a registered charity and membership organisation a (founding member was Betty Churcher) with a board of directors, funded by the Queensland Government (through Arts Queensland); the Australian Government (through the Australia Council); the Visual Arts and Crafts Strategy (a partnership between the federal and all state and territory governments in Australia); and many private sponsors.

=== Directors ===
- 1975: Robert Jadin de Fronenteau
- 1976–79: John Buckley, who had been at art school in Melbourne and previously worked at the Vancouver Art Gallery
- 1980–82: John Nixon
- 1982–83: Barbara Campbell, Gallery Co-ordinator
- 1984–86: Peter Cripps
- 1987–90: Sue Cramer
- 1990–94: Nicholas Tsoutas
- 1994–2004: Michael Snelling
- 2004–05: David Broker
- 2005-2013: Robert Leonard
- 2013-2019: Aileen Burns & Johan Lundh
- 2019–2023: Liz Nowell
- 2023–current: Robert Leonard

== Description ==
The building is minimalist, located under and behind the Judith Wright Centre, in the inner-city suburb of Fortitude Valley in Brisbane. Entrance is free to the public, and it is open from Tuesdays to Friday 10 am–5pm. It offers free guided tours.

The IMA features contemporary artworks and showcases emerging artists. Its temporary exhibitions and projects have presented all media from local, regional, national and international visual artists. It publishes It presents an annual program of art exhibitions as well as public programs, featuring local and international artists. Its exhibitions have been described as "cutting edge", including items such as video installations and large-scale sculptures. Past exhibits have included multimedia installations, mirror art by Yoko Ono from the 1960s, the surrealist work of Peter Madden and video montages of early 20th century hard labour.

The institute has also hosted screenings, residencies, forums, lectures, and conferences. There is a large range of art books, as well as local design objects and gifts in the gallery shop.

The IMA is also committed to research, and publishes catalogues, monographs, and academic articles.

== Awards ==
Since 2019, the IMA has hosted the churchie emerging art prize, a non-acquisitive art award established in 1987, with a prize pool of A$25,000 (major prize A$15,000), to help the careers of emerging artists; all finalists' work is displayed at the gallery in a curated exhibition.

== Selected exhibitions ==
The Institute of Modern Art has mounted hundreds of exhibitions since its inception, showcasing the work of an estimated nearly 850 artists by 2022. Exhibitions have featured some big names in the art world, such as the American artists Robert Rauschenberg and John Baldessari, while contemporary Australian artists include Hany Armanious, Kate Parker, Fred Williams, Imants Tillers, Luke Roberts, Mike Parr, Gordon Bennett, Mikala Dwyer, Shaun Gladwell, Angelica Mesiti, Chicks on Speed and Brook Andrew. A selection of exhibitions follows.

- 1975, 1–30 August: solo exhibition of the work of John Olsen (the first verified exhibition at IMA)
- 1982, September; Australian Screenprints 1982, 15 artist screenprinters, presented by the Print Council of Australia; Ray Arnold, Sydney Ball, John Coburn, Bruce Latimer, Alun Leach-Jones, Sandra Leveson-Meares, Mandy Martin, Greg Moncrieff, Ann Newmarch, Sally Robinson, David Rose, Stephen Spurrier, Arthur Wicks, Normana Wight and Paul Zika. Coincident with Festival '82 Warana and Commonwealth Festival and with the Commonwealth Games, proceeds donated to the Aboriginal Legal Aid Service. Toured 12 venues throughout Australia.
- 1985: Recession Art & Other Strategies, a group exhibition curated by artist and then-director Peter Cripps and featuring work by him, Gunter Christmann, Robert MacPherson, and John Nixon; accompanied by a catalogue, and the subject of a lecture in 2020 by Peter Cripps at Australian Centre for Contemporary Art in Melbourne, citing the exhibition as a "defining moment" in Australian art exhibition history
- 1986: Know Your Product
- 1986, 7–25 October 1986: Q Space + Q Space Annex 1980 + 1981; with Recession Art and Know your Product, one of a suite of exhibitions at IMA
- 1987, 31 March – 18 April: The Shadow of Reason, group show curated by Judy Annear
- 2010, 27 March – 29 May: Peter Madden: Come Together
- 2019, 13 April – 8 June: Haunt , a group exhibition including works by Zanny Begg, Fiona Connor, Megan Cope, Brian Jungen, Amie Siegel, Duane Linklater, Heman Chong, Christian Nyampeta and Norwegian artist Joar Nango
- 2019, 13 April – 8 June: New Eelam: Brisbane, a solo exhibition of an ongoing project by British-Sri Lankan artist Christopher Kulendran Thomas (Eelam is the Tamil name for Sri Lanka), in collaboration with Annika Kuhlmann; first shown at the 9th Berlin Biennial and 11th Gwangju Biennale in 2016 and then travelling the world,
- 2019,9 February–30 March: Current Iterations, featuring the work of Dale Harding
- 2021, 17 July – 19 September: Yhonnie Scarce: Missile Park

== Publications ==
IMA published a periodical, initially named IMA Bulletin, from 1990 to 2001, and then IMA Newsletter, from October–January 2001/2002 until October–January 2005/2006.

Significant monographs published by IMA include:

- Lingard, Bob; Cramer, Sue, eds. (1989), Institute of Modern Art : A documentary history, 1975–1989, Institute of Modern Art, ISBN 978-0-9588640-6-0

== Contemporary Art Organisations Australia ==
The IMA is a founding member of Contemporary Art Organisations Australia (CAOA), a national network of art organisations founded in 1995. As of 2022, chaired by Alexie Glass-Kantor, CAOA's members include 16 public, independent, non-collecting contemporary art organisations from all over Australia, which collaboratively advocate for the small-to-medium contemporary visual arts sector and living artists. Other members include the 4A Centre for Contemporary Asian Art in Sydney, ACE Open in Adelaide, Artspace in Sydney, the Australian Centre for Contemporary Art in Melbourne and the Perth Institute of Contemporary Arts.
