= Victor Wang (curator) =

Canadian-born curator

Victor Wang (Chinese: 王宗孚; pinyin: Wáng Zōngfú) is a curator, art historian and museum director. He is the Executive Director of Artspace, an independent, not-for-profit contemporary art centre in Sydney, Australia and an Adjunct Curator at the Mori Art Museum in Tokyo. Wang is the former Executive and Artistic Director of the M WOODS Museum, a contemporary art museum with sites in Beijing and Chengdu.

Wang has organised exhibitions with institutions including the Palais de Tokyo, Tate Modern in London and the Staatliche Museen zu Berlin. In 2021, he curated the first collaborative exhibition between the British Museum (U.K.) and a not-for-profit art museum in China (M WOODS).

Wang is known for his exhibitions, cross-cultural collaborations, and work in contemporary and performance art. He is the founder of the Institute of Asian Performance Art (IAPA) and has contributed to publications including Artforum, ArtReview and Yishu: Journal of Contemporary Chinese Art.

== Early life and education ==
Wang was raised in Canada by a Chinese father and Chilean mother. His diverse cultural upbringing profoundly shaped his curatorial vision, emphasising the importance of storytelling, cultural exchange and global perspectives.

He received early curatorial training through institutional programs and professional experience at the Vancouver Art Gallery and the Institute of Contemporary Arts (ICA), London.

Wang received his MA in Curating Contemporary Art from the Royal College of Art in London and has participated in curatorial residencies including Tokyo Arts and Space (TOKAS) in 2017 and the Gwangju Biennale International Curator Course in 2016.

== Career ==
=== Artspace ===
In 2025, Wang succeeded Alexie Glass-Kantor as the Executive Director of Artspace. In this senior leadership role, Wang oversees Artspace’s curatorial and public programs, exhibitions and international partnerships. Upon his appointment, Wang stated his plans to expand Artspace’s reach by deepening cultural ties with the Asia-Pacific region and the Global South.

=== Mori Art Museum ===
Wang was appointed as an Adjunct Curator of The Mori Art Museum in Tokyo, Japan in 2025. This curatorship is a dual role held alongside his Executive Directorship at Artspace. In December 2025, Wang will curate the MAM Project 034, the first solo presentation of acclaimed British multimedia artist Sonia Boyce in Japan.

=== M WOODS Museum ===
Wang served as the Executive and Artistic Director of the M WOODS Museum from 2019 to 2025. Under his leadership, the museum opened a new location in Chengdu, China in 2023.

Selected exhibitions curated and co-curated by Wang include:

- Giorgio Morandi: The Poetics of Stillness (2020): The first museum solo exhibition of Morandi in China, and the largest in Asia, showcasing over 80 works.
- Italian Renaissance Drawings: A Dialogue with China (2021): In collaboration with the British Museum.
- Man Ray (2021): The first large scale museum exhibition of Man Ray in China featuring over 240 works.
- Ryuichi Sakamoto: seeing sound, hearing time (2021) and Sound and Time (2024). Curated by Wang as part of the original curatorial team, these exhibitions were among the final major museum projects developed during Sakamoto’s lifetime. The 2021 exhibition included the publication of Sakamoto's first book in Chinese.
- Bruce Nauman: OK OK OK (2022): Nauman’s first exhibition in China, in collaboration with the Tate Modern in London, and Stedelijk Museum, Amsterdam.
- Martin Margiela (2022): Margiela’s first major exhibition in Asia, showcasing over 50 new works, in collaboration with Lafayette Anticipations, Fondation d’entreprise Galeries Lafayette, Paris.
- Ann Veronica Janssens: pinkyellowblue (2023): The first museum survey of Janssens in China.
- Salman Toor: New Paintings and Drawings (2023).

Several of these exhibitions—including large-scale survey presentations of artists such as Ryuichi Sakamoto, Martin Margiela, and Richard Tuttle—formed an important part of Wang’s curatorial practice during this period. Working on large-scale survey exhibitions incorporating sound, technology, performance, and textile-based practices informed his approach to exhibition-making at scale, particularly in relation to spatial design, materiality, and the integration of sound within museum contexts. These projects contributed to his long-term curatorial thinking around interdisciplinary and sensory exhibition models.

== Independent projects ==
Wang's curatorial practice seeks to foster cross-cultural dialogue between artists and regions.

Key exhibitions include:

- Inside China – L'Intérieur du Géant (2015): Co-curated with Jo-ey Tang of the Palais de Tokyo for the K11 Art Foundation. It represents one of Wang’s earliest collaborations with institutions dedicated to cross-cultural exchange.
- Ensemble sin órganos (2016): The first performance-based exhibition at the Wifredo Lam Centre for Contemporary Art in Havana. The show featured artists Trisha Brown, VALIE EXPORT and Yvonne Rainer in an artistic dialogue between the Global South, Asia and Euro-America.
- Zhongguo 2185 (2017): Presented at Sadie Coles HQ in London, Zhongguo 2185 introduced Chinese artists, Lu Yang, Yu Ji and Nabuqi to Western audiences.
- Institute of Asian Performance Art: Tokyo (2018): Held at Tokyo Arts and Space Hongo, this exhibition featured artists Mako Idemitsu (Japan), Zhang Peili (China) and Park Hyunki (South Korea).
- Micro Era: Time-based Media Art from China (2019): An exhibition introducing Chinese media art to European audiences at the Nationalgalerie Berlin.
- Afterimage: Dangdai Yishu (2019): Hosted at the Lisson Gallery, featuring Chinese female artists Yu Hong and Lin Tianmiao.
- Haroon Mirza: Tones in the Key of Electricity (2019): The first solo museum exhibition in China by UK-based artist Haroon Mirza. Presented at the Sifang Art Museum in Nanjing.

== Frieze LIVE ==
In 2020, Wang curated The Institute of Melodic Healing for Frieze LIVE, an 111-hour project exploring sound and performance as tools for healing during the COVID-19 pandemic. The initiative featured international artists Alvaro Barrington, Mandy El-Sayegh, Cécile B. Evans, Denzil Forrester, Anthea Hamilton, Haroon Mirza and Zadie Xa & Benito Mayor Vallejo.

== Lecturing and public engagements ==
Wang has lectured on curating and contemporary Chinese art at universities such as the Tokyo University of the Arts, Tokyo, The Courtauld Institute of Art, London, Central Academy of Fine Arts (CAFA), Beijing, Royal College of Art, London, Goldsmiths, University of London, Royal Academy Schools, London and Yale Schwarzman Center, Yale University, Connecticut.

He has participated in panel discussions with artists including Yinka Shonibare CBE, Richard Tuttle, Denzil Forrester and Tehching Hsieh.

== Publications ==
=== Books ===
- IAPA Reader: Performance Histories from East Asia 1960s–90s (2018)
- Oscar Murillo: The Build-up of Content and Information (2018, David Zwirner Books)
- Pod, Capsule, Cluster (2019) with Richard Tuttle

=== Catalogues ===
- Ryuichi Sakamoto: Seeing Sound, Hearing Time (2021)
- Bruce Nauman: OK OK OK (2022, Tate Publishing and M WOODS)

=== Articles ===
- In Artforum, ArtReview and Yishu: Journal of Contemporary Chinese Art
- Academic essay on Kim Kulim for the National Museum of Modern and Contemporary Art (MMCA)
