= Cindy Ji Hye Kim =

Korean-Canadian artist

Cindy Ji Hye Kim (Korean: 김지혜; born 1990) is a Korean-Canadian artist. She is known for her figurative paintings rendered in a grisaille palette. Much of her work is executed on translucent silk and is hung from the ceiling to reveal intricately shaped stretcher bars.

== Early life and education ==
Kim was born in Incheon, South Korea and grew up in Anyang. She immigrated to Canada with her family in 2003. Kim obtained her BFA from Rhode Island School of Design in 2013, and her MFA from Yale University in 2016. She currently lives and works in New York City.

== Work ==
Kim's work often depicts archetypal figures in charged domestic settings. "Watercolor and pastel figures play across delicate stretched silk, and with the heavy use of graphite and charcoal, essential dualities are conjured: light and dark, spiritual and material, unconscious and conscious." In Art in America, Julia Wolkoff notes that "Kim uses multiple mediums (acrylic, ink, pastel, and oil paint) to inject her works with darkly poetic painterly gestures."

In Artforum, Barry Schwabsky describes Kim as "a draftsperson of implicit elegance and concision, with a style that falls somewhere between Max Fleischer and Christina Ramberg." Of Kim's artistic approach, Casey Carsel writes: "In both medium and content [...] Kim has become expert at laying bare the tensions between the visible and the hidden, with artworks that often push the sculptural and performative limits of the traditional two-dimensional painting surface." Her exhibitions have been reviewed in the New York Times, the New Yorker, the Brooklyn Rail, and Hyperallergic, among other publications.

Her work has been the subject of solo exhibitions at MIT List Visual Art Center in 2020, Kunsthall Stavanger in 2022, and SCAD Museum of Art in 2024.

== Collections ==
Kim's work is in the permanent collections of the Los Angeles County Museum of Art, the Sifang Art Museum, the University of Chicago Booth School of Business Art Collection, and the Rhode Island School of Design Museum.
