= Michael Xufu Huang =

Chinese art collector and socialite (born 1994)

- 黄勖夫
- Born: 1994 (age 30–31); Chongqing, China
- Education: Dulwich College; University of Pennsylvania
- Occupation(s): Art collector, socialite

Michael Xufu Huang (Chinese: 黄勖夫; pinyin: Huáng Xùfū; born 1994) is a Chinese art collector and socialite. Huang co-founded the M Woods Museum of Beijing's 798 Art Zone in 2015 and the X Museum in the Chaoyang district of Beijing in 2020. His art collecting activities have led The New York Times to profile him in 2017 as "something of a next-generation Jeffrey Deitch of China."

== Early life and education ==
Huang was born in Chongqing, China in 1994, and grew up in Beijing. His mother works in the pharmaceutical industry and his father is a finance lawyer. As a teenager, Huang became interested in art while attending boarding school in the United Kingdom. He recalled an exhibition on the beach paintings of Alex Katz at Tate St Ives, where he "really felt connected with the work" and "grew [his] passion for art." After finishing his education at Dulwich College and completing his A Levels in art history, Huang moved to the United States to study at the University of Pennsylvania. In university, Huang studied art history and marketing and was active in the Zeta Psi fraternity. He graduated in 2017.

== Career ==
Huang developed his interests in art at the age of 16. His parents gifted him his first work of art, a lithograph by Helen Frankenthaler, for his sixteenth birthday in 2010. He started slowly collecting in 2013, after moving to Philadelphia to attend university.

=== M Woods Museum ===
While a sophomore at the University of Pennsylvania in 2015, Huang joined the contemporary art museum M Woods as a co-founder alongside art collectors Lin Han and Wanwan Lei. Located in Beijing's 798 Art Zone, the museum focuses on "internet-minded" works of artists such as He Xiangyu and Olafur Eliasson. Its debut exhibition on Andy Warhol in 2016 received international recognition. Later that year, Huang joined the board of the New Museum in New York City as its youngest member.

In the summer of 2017, Huang curated his first major exhibition, Heart of the Tin Man, a survey of artists influenced by post-Internet culture. Huang announced his resignation and the withdrawal of his collection from the museum in 2019.

=== X Museum ===
In 2020, Huang co-founded the X Museum, focused on Chinese contemporary art, with businesswoman Theresa Tse. It is located in the Chaoyang district of Beijing. The museum aims to provide an art platform for millennial artists and present contemporary art works that are heavily influenced by globalisation.

=== Other activities ===
In 2020, Huang was reported to be a stakeholder in Mine Project, a commercial gallery that opened in Hong Kong a year earlier. He organised its inaugural exhibition, Cutthroat Kitchen, on the works of Chinese artist Zhang Zipiao.

In 2022, Bloomberg News reported that Huang had filed a lawsuit against art collector Federico Castro Debernardi. The lawsuit alleged that Debernardi had violated the terms of a sales agreement involving a Cecily Brown painting that Huang had previously bought from the Paula Cooper Gallery and resold to Debernardi for an added commission. A settlement between Huang and the gallery was reportedly reached just before the Bloomberg report.

== Personal life ==
Huang was one of the influential figures defrauded by Anna Sorokin after the two met in New York City. Sorokin claimed to be a wealthy German heiress under the fictitious identity of Anna Delvey. Huang later purchased a portrait of Sorokin in court, drawn by Chinese artist Gong Jian, for the X Museum's collection, stating "I paid more for this work than the hotel charges I apparently lost." He is depicted in the 2022 Netflix miniseries Inventing Anna, based on Sorokin's life.

== Recognition ==
In 2016, Apollo magazine highlighted Huang in its "40 Under 40 Asia Pacific" list. In 2017, he was named to Forbes 30 Under 30 list under its "Art & Style" category.
