= Raquel Ormella =

Australian artist (born 1969)

- Born: 1969 (age 56–57); Sydney, Australia
- Education: Western Sydney University; Australian National University

Raquel Ormella (born 1969) is an Australian artist focusing on multimedia works such as posters, banners, videography and needlework. Ormella’s work has been showcased in many exhibitions in galleries and museums, including the Shepparton Art Museum and the Art Gallery of New South Wales. Working in Sydney and Canberra, Ormella’s pieces are known to encompass themes of activism and social issues in many forms and has received praise.

== Early life ==
Raquel Ormella was born in Sydney in 1969 to her South American mother and Spanish father. Ormella’s parents immigrated from Germany to Australia. Due to their migration, Ormella identified the negative affect it had on her family and felt a separation from her European life. This rift intrigued her and influenced her decision to spend time in Vienna at the end of her studies.

Ormella first studied Visual Arts at Western Sydney University, Nepean from 1992 to 1996 and then spent a year at the Akademie der Bilden Kunst in Vienna. She also holds of a Masters of Fine Arts from Western Sydney University, Nepean in 2003-5. Ormella was awarded a PhD in Visual Arts by the Australian National University in 2013. Her thesis examined human relationships with urban birds.

== Career ==
Since 2006 Ormella has taught painting at the Australian National University in the third year, Honours and post-graduate programs along with continuing her personal practice.

Ormella is an artist working at the intersections of art and activism, investigating the means by which critical reflexivity in contemporary art encourages processes of self-examination regarding political consciousness and social action. Ormellaʼs practice is grounded in exploring the nature of the relationship between humans and the natural environment, with a particular focus on urban expansion and forest activism. In highlighting the connectedness between the two, Ormella attempts to show that our depictions of the natural world are not representations of true "wilderness" or a pure state, but rather are informed by human contact and reflective of human values. Ormella has built a practice covering a diverse range of activities such as textiles, video, paintings, installations, drawings, and zines. She is interested in exploring the relation of the audience to the artwork by using multiples. Ormella’s works are displayed in both galleries as well as public spaces. The use of textiles and posters as mediums coincides with Ormella’s focus on activism. The history of embroidery and textile work is embedded in feminist art and was considered ‘women’s work', Ormella uses it as an enforcement of feminist activism in her works.

Ormella’s work focuses more on the story of the world around her rather than herself. She takes into account other individuals' experiences for a theme of commonality within activism. She believes the works should speak for themselves and not be influenced or interpreted via her personal story.

In 2006 Ormella won the $15000 F J Foundation Acquisitive Prize for the New Social Commentaries exhibition at the Warnambool Art Gallery. The felt-tip marker drawings on whiteboards refer to the campaign to save Tasmania's forests leading up to the 2004 Federal election.

Three of Ormella’s works are held in the Cruthers Collection of Women's Art at the University of Western Australia:

- Pick me, 2002–2003, flannel fabric and ribbon, 106 x 192 cm. CCWA 885
- Xanana Gusmao’s son has a tattoo of his father’s face on his chest. 1999, Felt, wood, 90 x 200 cm. CCWA 943
- Golden Soil #2, 2014, nylon, 92 x 152 cm. CCWA 971

== Exhibitions ==
Recent exhibitions include:

- 2017 The 1st Californian Pacific Triennial, Orange County Museum of Art, USA
- 2017 3rd Tamworth Textile Triennial
- 2015 Artist Making Movement, Asian Art Biennial, National Taiwan Museum of Fine Arts, Taichung
- 2015 See you at the barricades, Art Gallery of New South Wales, Sydney
- 2015 More love hours: contemporary artists and craft, Ian Potter Museum of Art, Melbourne
- 2014 Basil Sellers Prize, Ian Potter Museum of Art, Melbourne
- 2014 Protest Songs, Artful Actions, Lismore Regional Gallery, Lismore
- 2013 Conflict: Contemporary responses to war, University of Queensland Art Museum, Brisbane
- 2013 Direct Democracy, MUMA, Melbourne
- 2013 Pigeon Auction: Looking at suburban subcultures, Casula Powerhouse Arts Centre, Liverpool, New South Wales
- 2012 8th Shanghai Biennial, China
- 2010 1st Aichi Triennale, Nagoya, Japan
- 2010 In the balance, MCA, Sydney

Solo exhibitions include:

- 2019 i hope you get this, Raquel Ormella, Drill Hall Gallery, Australian National University
- 2018 i hope you get this: Raquel Ormella, Shepparton Art Museum, Shepparton, Victoria
- 2016 Golden Soil, Milani Gallery
- 2013 Birds, School of Art Gallery, ANU, Canberra
- 2013 New Constellation, Milani Gallery
- 2012 Feeders Canberra Contemporary Art Space, ACT

== Awards, grants and prizes ==
- 2018, Visions of Australia program, Department of Communications and Art
- 2017, Sunshine Coast Art Prize
- 2016, One Year Studio Artist, Art space, Sydney
- 2012, Fisher’s Ghost Art Award, Campbelltown Art Centre, NSQ
- 2009, New Work Grant, Australian Council
- 2007, PHD scholarship, College of Arts and Social Sciences, Australian National University
- 2007, New Work Grant, Arts ACT
- 2007, New Work Grant, Australian Council for the Arts
- 2006, New Social Commentaries, Warrnambool Regional Art Gallery
- 2006, Capital Arts Patrons Organisations, Singapore Airways travelling grant
- 2003, Australian Postgraduate research scholarship, and UWS Research Bonus
- 2000, Western Sydney artist Fund, NSW Ministry for the Arts
- 1999, Australia Council Studio Residency, Barcelona, Spain
- 1996, Dyson Bequest travelling Scholarship, Art Gallery of NSW for study
- 1992, William Fletcher Trust Prize

== Works ==
- 2018, City without Crows
- 2016, Golden Soil
- 2014, Wealth for Toil I
- 2013, Poetic Possibility
- 2006-2008, Going Back/Volver
