= Narelle Jubelin =

Australian artist (born 1960)

Narelle Jubelin (born 1960) is an Australian artist who has lived and practiced in Madrid since 1996. Jubelin's often collaborative work spans across media such as sculpture, printmaking, multi-media installation and is especially focused on single thread petit point stitching. She has been exhibiting her work internationally for over 30 years and exhibited work in the 1990 Venice Biennale. Her work is held in the Cruthers Collection of Women's Art, and she is represented by Mori Gallery, Sydney and The Commercial Gallery, Sydney. Her work brings attention to themes of cultural exchange, feminine labour, modernism and Australian feminism, architecture and colonialism.

== Early life and education ==
Born in Sydney in 1960, Jubelin attended the Alexander Mackie College of Advanced Education where she received a Bachelor of Education in Art in 1982. She received a Graduate Diploma in Professional Art Studies from the University of New South Wales College of Fine Arts in 1983.

== Career ==
Jubelin's artworks deal with the reduction of architectural paintings and photographs to miniature petit point works – fine needlework that consists of coloured cotton thread and silk mesh. It has been stated that her reduction of artworks into petit point stitching draws attention to women's labour, and the overlooked slow processes of feminine labour.

It has been said that Jubelin's use of petit point needlework to recreate architectural forms and landscapes responds to the non-expressive typologies of late Modernism, particularly to the works of Bernd and Hilla Becher. Working at a time in Australian history shaped by post colonialist, technological and multicultural concerns, Jubelin's work often responds to the globalisation concerns of the late 1980s and early 1990s, and the interest in the exploration of Modernist practices.

In 1985, Jubelin co-founded Firstdraft Gallery in Sydney.

One of Jubelin's earliest works, The Unforeseen (1989), features petit point works encased in a found wooden frames to highlight the central stitched panel of a man entering a mining cave. This central panel forms the pupil of the eye, and is said to comment on colonial male enterprise, and the historical devaluing of women's achievements. The use of women's hobby and domestic craft is central to this artwork and most of Jubelin's other works, as it is said to reject the traditional hierarchical value system of art mediums and instead centres women's labour in a gallery space. The shape of the eye is central to the meaning of this work as it appears to observe viewers, engaging with ideas of psychoanalytic identification and the male gaze. The vaginal imagery of the cave in the work adds to the unconscious psychoanalytic identification.

Jubelin was brought to public attention by her work Trade Delivers People, which was shown at the 1990 Venice Biennale, where she represented Australia. Trade Delivers People addresses cultural exchange and colonialism, and the way signs and symbols of local cultures are globally exploited, rendering them foreign.

Soft Shoulder, (1997) responds to similar ideas addressed in Trade Delivers People. Soft Shoulder was Jubelin's debut work in the United States, at the Renaissance Society of the University of Chicago. The work was said to explore "the inter-relatedness of people and places the inter-relatedness of people and places as they occur by way of fate, coincidence or deliberate migration and exchange." Using petit point works that seek to connect Chicago and Australia, Soft Shoulder addresses issues of identity at the heart of cultural production and questions what a universal sense of belonging and home actually is.

Case No. T961301 was first exhibited at the Tate Liverpool Gallery in 1998. The work consisted of two suspended stainless steel, round tables, set with textual transcripts, cutlery, petit points and photographs. The transcripts and other objects directly link to four English women activists, known as the "Ploughshares Four", who destroyed an aircraft that was set to be deployed in East Timor. As a peacekeeping effort, the women attacked the plane with cutlery and other mundane implements. It is suggested that this exhibition consisting of the readymade seeks to address colonialism and cultural exchange like many of Jubelin's work. The work has been criticised by author Sean Cubitt for its lack of tactility in response to the tactical work of the Ploughshares Four. Cubitt states that "Jubelin's problem is to make a work that is as successful as that, [The Ploughshares Four] and she fails." He says that the physicality of the Ploughshares Four is not present in the work, and that a gallery space can never equal the "urgency of the tactician". However, it is stated that the work can help to remember the achievements of the past.

The first major retrospective of Jubelin's work occurred in 2012, entitled Vision in Motion. The exhibition showcased Jubelin's petit point, collaborative and video-based works across three major Australian university museums — The University of Sydney, Monash University and the University of South Australia. Focusing on architectural and environmental forms, these works address the history of Australian Modernist art through feminine craft and needlework, using "subversive stitch" to incorporate feminist, sexual and phallic signifiers.

Jubelin's exhibition The Housing Question showed at Penrith Regional Gallery in 2019 in collaboration with Helen Grace. The Housing Question incorporates text, video and needlework to addresses notions of home, safety and security in an era of homelessness, mass housing and refugee displacement. Jubelin's petit point works in the exhibition are said to directly reference her father's photographs of her family home.

Jubelin's work is currently held in many major public collections, including the Albertina Print Museum, Vienna, and the National Gallery of Australia, Canberra. Her work has been shown globally, in places such as José Guerrero Center, Granada, Artists' Space, Jerusalem and the Marlborough Contemporary, London. Since 1987, the Cruthers Collection of Women's Art has collected many of Jubelin's works.

== Solo exhibitions ==
2016

Primitive Flamenco, The Commercial Gallery, Sydney

Primitive Flamenco, Marlborough Contemporary, London

2013

Vision in Motion, Samstag Museum, University of South Australia, Adelaide

2012

Afterimage, La Casa Encendida, Madrid

Vision in Motion, Monash University Museum of Art, Melbourne

Vision in Motion, University of Sydney, Sydney

2008

Hairy Hair, Luis Serpa Projects Gallery, Lisbon

2006

Ungrammatical Landscape, José Guerrero Center, Granada

2003

Duration Houses, Mori Gallery, Sydney

1999

Case No: T961301, Mori Gallery, Sydney

1997

Soft Shoulder, Art Gallery of Western Australia, Perth

1995

Soft Shoulder, Gray Art Gallery & Study Center, New York University, New York

1994

Soft Shoulder, The Renaissance Society, the University of Chicago, Chicago

1993

Estate, Galerie Knoll, Budapest

1992

Dead Slow, Center for Contemporary Art, Glasgow

1990

Trade Delivers People, Venice Biennale, Venice

1987

Re-presenting His Story, Institute of Technology, Architecture Faculty Gallery, Sydney

1986

His Story, Mori Gallery, Sydney
