= Hazelhurst Regional Gallery and Arts Centre =

Arts complex in New South Wales, Australia

Hazelhurst Arts Centre
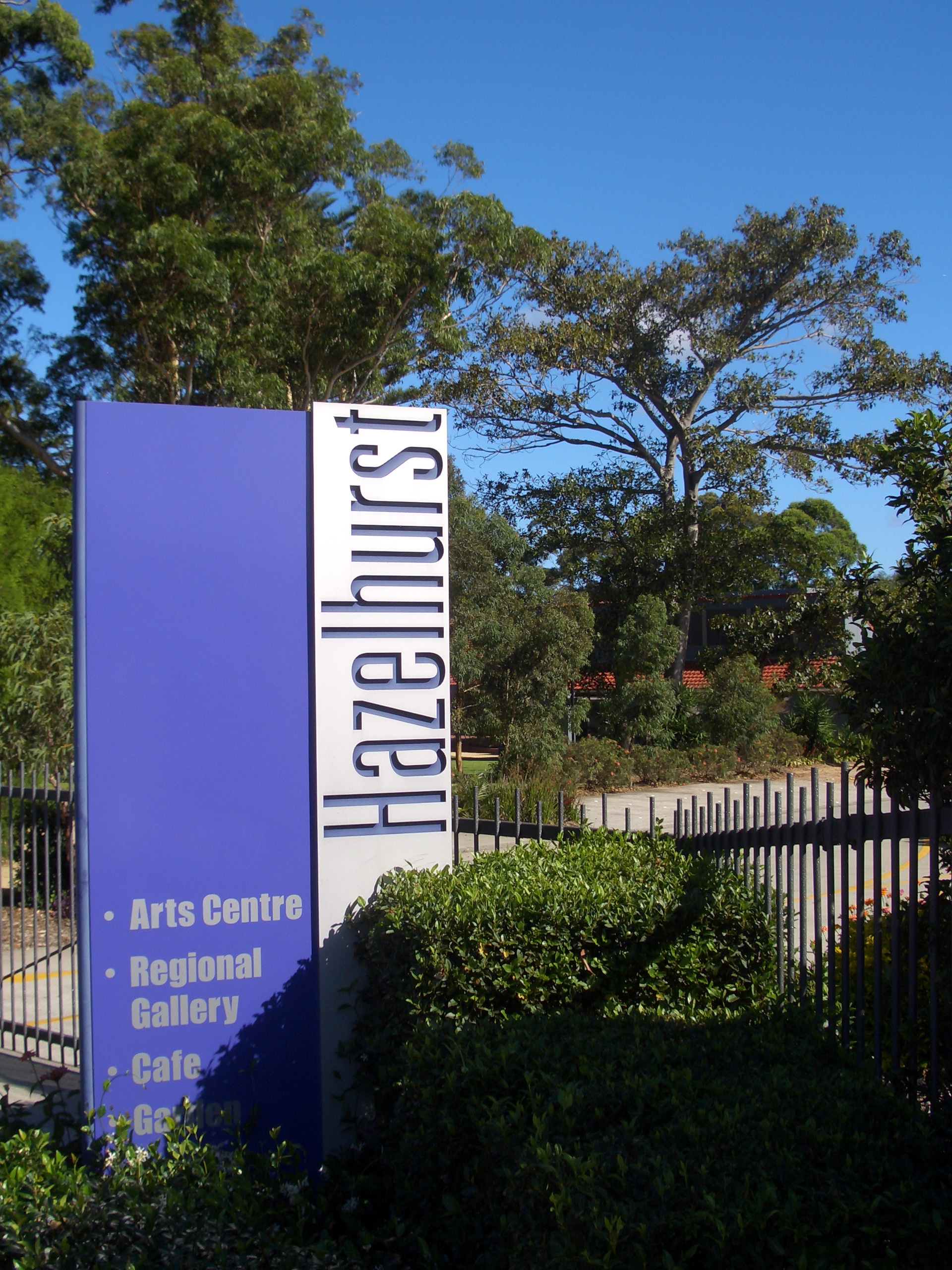
- Hazelhurst Gallery sign, as viewed from Kingsway

- Location within Sydney
- Established: 22 January 2000; 26 years ago
- Location: Gymea, Sydney, New South Wales, Australia
- Coordinates: 34°02′00″S 151°04′57″E
- Type: Visual arts, performance space, cafe
- Owner: Sutherland Shire
- Public transit access: Gymea railway station
- Website: www.hazelhurst.com.au

Hazelhurst Arts Centre, also known as Hazelhurst Regional Gallery & Arts Centre, Hazelhurst Gallery and Hazelhurst, is an arts complex located on Kingsway in the suburb of Gymea, in southern Sydney, New South Wales, Australia. It is the first public arts centre of its kind in Australia and sits on 1.4 hectares (3.5 acres) of gardens. The complex includes two art galleries, a theatrette, art studios, meeting rooms, gift shop and café as well as the gardens. The facility is also available for hire as a function centre. Hazelhurst opened on 22 January 2000. Architects for the building were Michael Bennet (of Jackson, Teece, Chesterman, Willis) in partnership with Esther and Trevor Hayter. The garden designs were by Oi Choong.

== History ==
Hazelhurst is an initiative of the Sutherland Shire Council and was created by the bequest of Ben and Hazel Broadhurst. The land that became Hazelhurst was secured in 1945, where a two-storey cottage, designed with the help of local architect Harry Smith, was built. The cottage is now used as Hazelhurst's artist-in-residence and digital media studio.

== Gallery ==
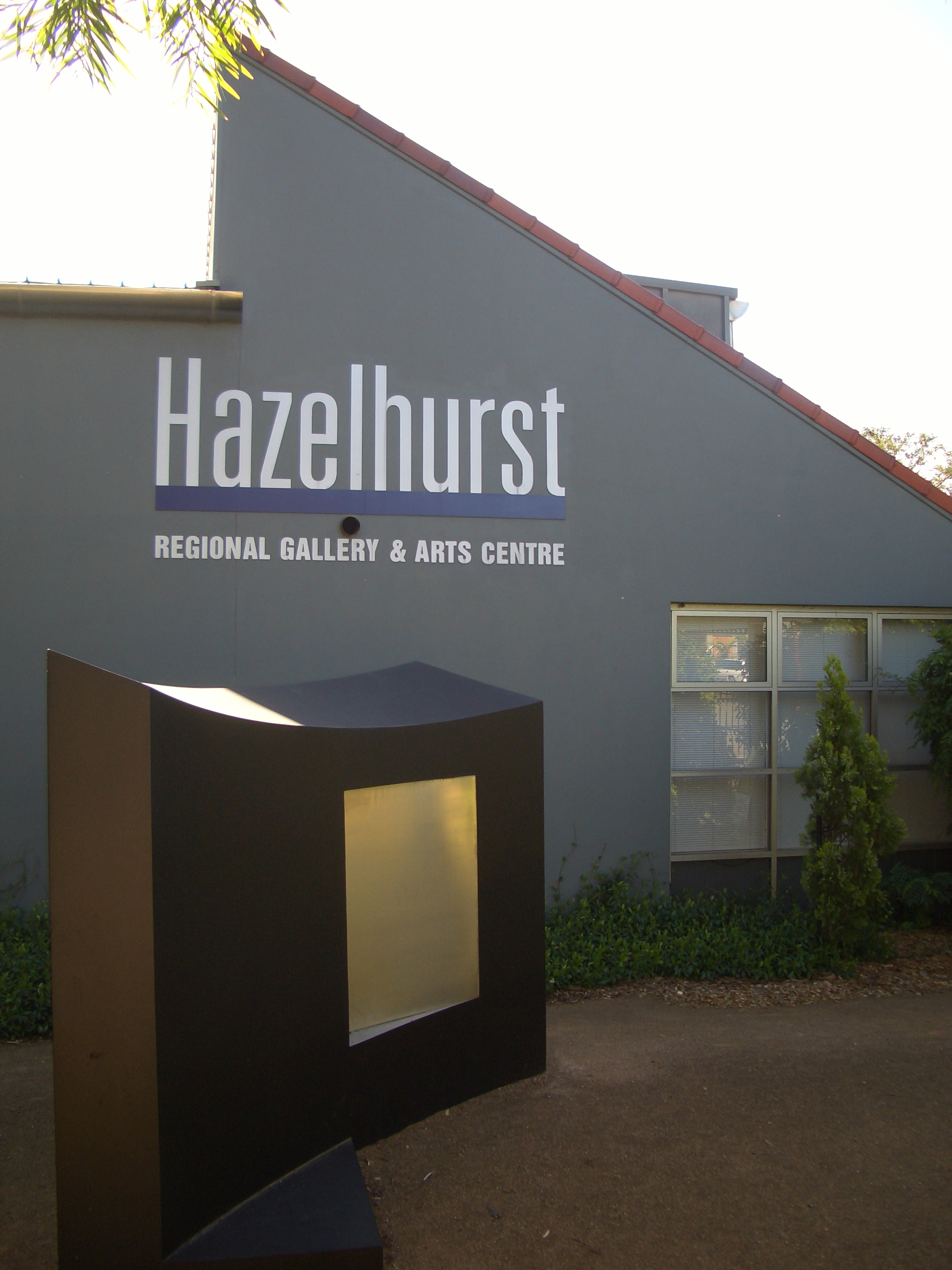
Hazelhurst Gallery

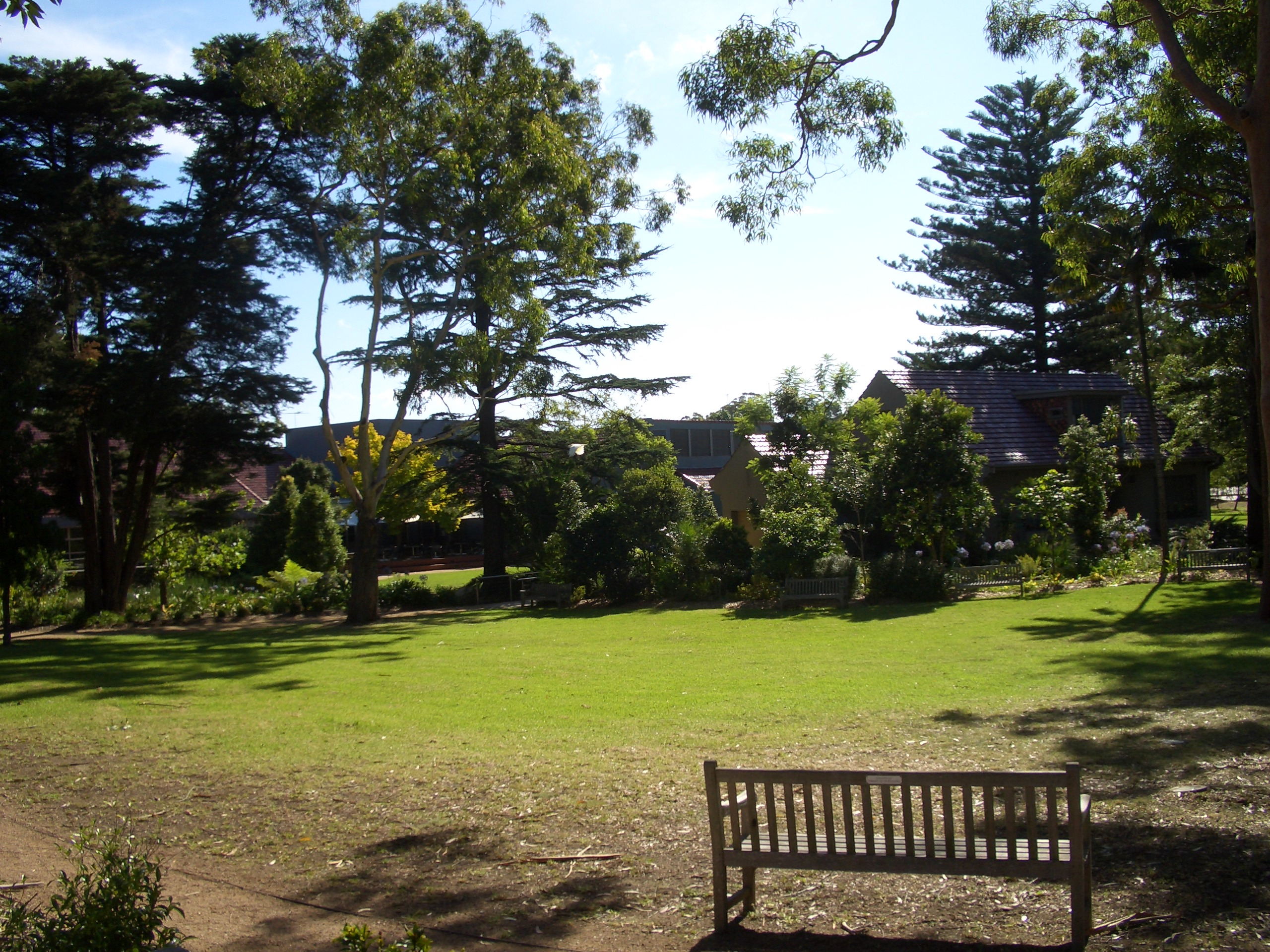
Hazelhurst gardens

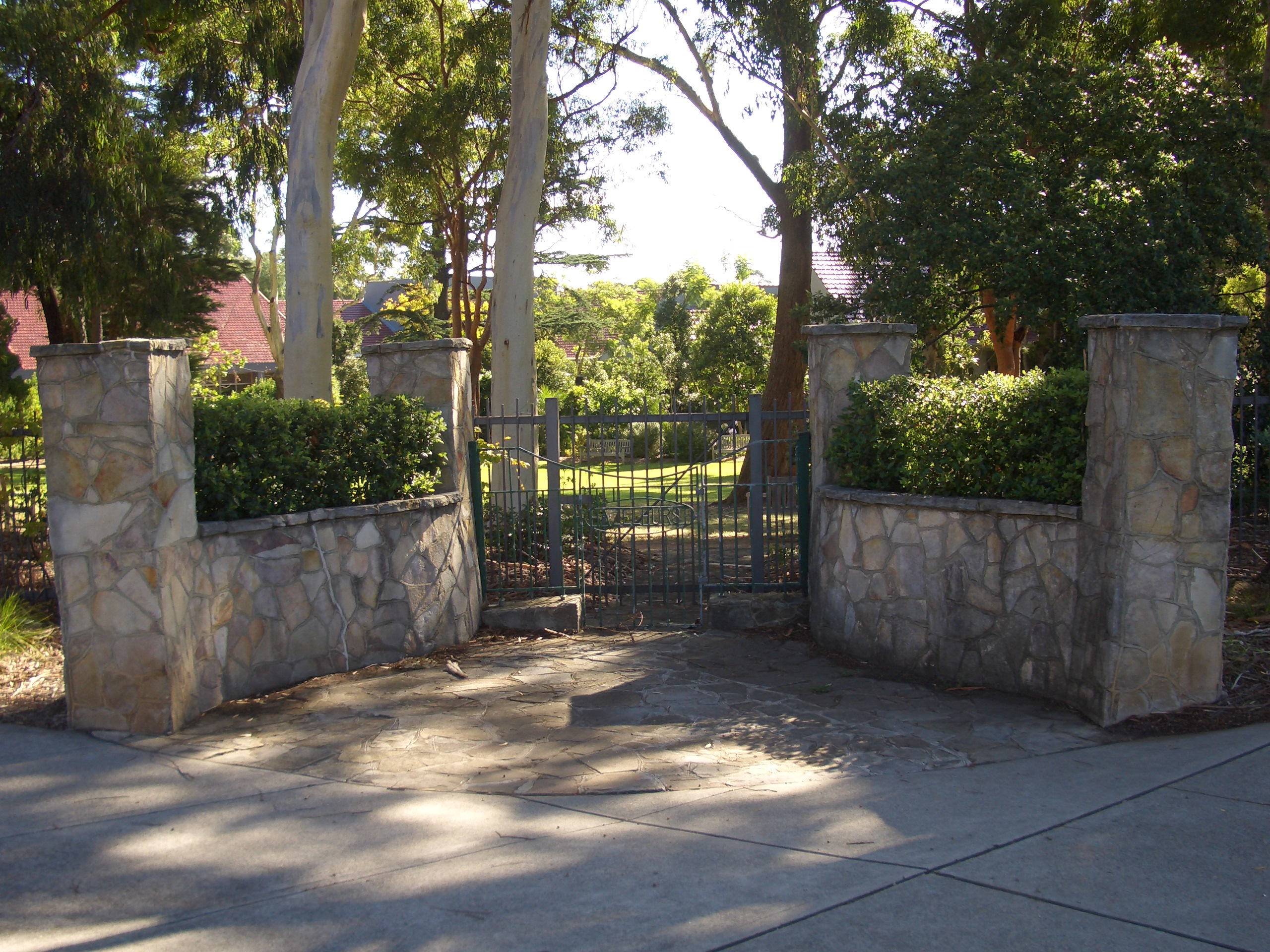
Hazelhurst gates
