= Justene Williams =

Australian artist and photographer (born 1970)

- Born: 1970; Sydney, New South Wales, Australia
- Occupation: Artist
- Known for: Photography, Australian art, multimedia art, Contemporary art
- Notable work: The Curtain Breathed Deeply, Artspace, Sydney (2014); Handbag Hammer Meditation, La Centrale Galerie Powerhouse, Montréal, 2013;

Justene Williams (born 1970) is an Australian artist. Williams works across different media including photography, video, performance, installation and sound. Williams has exhibited widely throughout Australia and internationally. Her works of art are held in a number of public collections including Art Gallery of New South Wales, Museum of Contemporary Art Australia, National Gallery of Australia and Auckland Art Gallery Toi o Tāmaki.

== Life ==
Williams was born in Sydney, New South Wales, Australia in 1970. She graduated with a Bachelor of Visual Arts from Western Sydney University in 1991. She has a background in dance and has also worked as a window dresser. Williams moved to Boston, USA in 2005, which precipitated a significant shift in her practice. Williams received her Masters of Visual Art from Sydney College of the Arts, University of Sydney, in 2006. Williams is currently teaching at Queensland College of Art in Brisbane where she is head of sculpture.

== Early art ==
Williams' early work was focused in the medium of photography and utilised the ad hoc nature of disposable cameras and one-hour printing labs. The locations for these early photographic projects were sites of public recreation such as shopping centres, car shows and strip clubs.

== Styles ==
Williams first became known in the 1990s for her photography. Often her work during this time was produced using disposable cameras with shopping malls and retail displays as subjects, this has been linked to her work in retail during this time. Australian suburban life drew her attention during this time, including strip clubs and car shows. Later Williams staged more of her photographs. Stylistically, this early period in her career is distinctive for its lo-fi aesthetic with extensive use of blurring and distortion.

After moving to the United States in 2005, where she was unable to work without a Green card, Williams' began to construct elaborate costumes in which she would perform in front of the camera.

Elaborate and immersive installation artworks including video and sculpture are the dominant mode of her most recent work, as seen in her exhibitions The Curtain Breathed Deeply (2014) and Handbag Hammer Meditation (2015).

References to modernism, especially Dada, occur frequently in her work. Her work for the Biennale of Sydney, Victory over the Sun (2016), references the early twentieth-century Cubo-Futurist opera of that name for which Kasimir Malevich made the costumes. It was re-performed at the National Gallery of Australia in 2022 and the costumes are now in the collection.https://nga.gov.au/exhibitions/justene-williams/

== Exhibitions ==
Solo Exhibitions

Once We Were Mudskippers, 3 October 2026 — 7 March 2027 Queensland Art Gallery and Gallery of Modern Art

The Curtain Breathed Deeply, 2 February – 2 April 2015, Monash University Museum of Art

The Curtain Breathed Deeply, 26 June – 10 August 2014, Artspace Sydney

Handbag Hammer Meditation, 13 September – 19 October 2013, La Centrale galerie Powerhouse, Montreal

== See also ==
- Australian art
