= Barbara Campbell =

Australian artist (born 1961)

- Born: 1961 (age 64–65); Beaudesert, Queensland, Australia
- Education: University of Sydney(BA); Sydney College of the Arts, MVA, PhD
- Known for: Performance art Installation art
- Notable work: National Gallery of Australia, Art Gallery of New South Wales
- Movement: Contemporary
- Spouse: Neil Roberts (artist)(died 2002)

Barbara Campbell (born 1961) is an Australian performance and installation artist.

== Early life and education ==
Campbell was born in Beaudesert, Queensland in 1961.

She studied film under Alan Cholodenko, Rex Butler and Keith Broadfoot at Power Department of Art History at University of Sydney in 1987. She completed a Master of Visual Arts at Sydney College of the Arts, University of Sydney in 1998.

In 2015, she completed a PhD at Sydney College of the Arts, researching how migratory shorebirds direct human performance.

== Influences and art practice ==
Campbell's influences come from peers working in the Sydney Super 8 Film Group, 60s minimalist filmmakers such as Stan Brakhage. Campbell also recognises the influence of French semioticians such as Christian Metz, Jean-Louis Baudry, André Bazin, Jean Baudrillard and Raymond Bellour. In 1987 Campbell took a course in Super 8 at the Tin Sheds art workshop at the University of Sydney, and conducted numerous workshops organised by Sydney Intermedia Network with artists and peers such as Andrew Frost.

Campbell later started using video, setting up live video feedback so that the camera and the monitor could be used to create a dialogue between performer and audience.

== Career ==
Campbell used text as the starting point for her large-scale installation Conradania, based on Joseph Conrad’s acclaimed 1899 novel The Heart of Darkness set on the Congo River in Africa. Francis Ford Coppola based the film Apocalypse Now on Conrad's novel. Campbell spent eight weeks typing out The Heart of Darkness word for word on twenty 15 ft (4.6 m) lengths of xuan paper. She then filmed the Jungle Cruise ride at Disneyland, which is played on a small screen in front of the hanging rice paper.

1001 nights cast (2005-2008) is written by hundreds of collaborators, using video to live web-stream performances through the project's dedicated website. The work was inspired by The Arabian Nights, the famous anthology of stories and how storytelling was a means of survival; the young woman Scheherazade stalls her execution by weaving an endless story of such intrigue that the King Shahriyar eventually grants her a reprieve.

From 1982 to 1983, Campbell was Gallery Co-ordinator at the Institute of Modern Art in Brisbane. She has also done research into the arts and culture sectors, and was an office bearer of the Queensland Artworkers Union (later Artworkers Alliance). In 1984, she ran the influential A Room art collective in George Street, Brisbane

== Collections ==
As of March 2022, four of her works are held in the National Gallery of Australia in Canberra.
