= Sam Smith (artist) =

Australian filmmaker and artist

Sam Smith is an Australian filmmaker and artist, based in the UK. He is one of the directors of the art gallery Obsidian Coast.

== Early life and education ==
Sam Smith was born in Christchurch, New Zealand.

He completed a BFA with Honours at the College of Fine Arts, Sydney, in 2003, and an MFA in Fine Art at Goldsmiths, University of London in 2015.

== Career ==
Smith's work has been exhibited at film festivals and galleries, including International Film Festival Rotterdam, Whitechapel Gallery and Institute of Contemporary Arts, Les Rencontres Internationales (Paris and Berlin), Australian Centre for the Moving Image (Melbourne), KW Institute for Contemporary Art (Berlin) and the Art Gallery of NSW in Sydney.

Smith is one of the directors of Obsidian Coast, a gallery in Bradford-on-Avon, with Nella Aarne.

Smith has undertaken a number of residencies. He was part of the International Studio Programme for one year at Künstlerhaus Bethanien in Berlin. Previous residencies include Helsinki International Artist Programme; Artspace, Sydney; and Youkobo Art Space in Tokyo, Japan.

== Awards ==
- 2007: Helen Lempriere Travelling Art Scholarship to undertake a series of artist mentorships in New York City and Berlin
- 2008: Winner, inaugural 2008 Wilson HTM National Art Prize
- 2008: Winner, Churchie national emerging art prize
- 2014: Ian Potter Cultural Trust grant

== Works ==
Selected projects
Title	Details	Year
Capture	Assisted by the Australian Government through the Australia Council for the Arts, its arts funding and advisory body and supported by the UNSW Mark Wainwright Analytical Centre, Solid State & Elemental Analysis Unit.	2021
Earth Return	mudmind Commissioned for Medium Earth by The Art Gallery of New South Wales	2020
Lithic Coda	Commissioned by Prototype Care Packages	2020
Lithic Choreographies	An International Art Space commission for spaced 3: north by southeast. Produced with the support of Baltic Art Center	2019
E.1027	Commissioned by Whitechapel Gallery, London	2016–19

== Personal life ==
As of 2023 Smith lives in Bradford-on-Avon.

== Publications ==
- Frames of Reference with texts by Post Brothers and Jan Verwoert, 128 pages, 28 full colour pages, softcover with French flaps, July 2014. Broken Dimanche Press (ISBN 978-3-943196-34-4) and Künstlerhaus Bethanien (ISBN 978-3-941230-31-6).
