= Kathy Temin =

Australian artist (born 1968)

- Born: 1968 (age 57–58)
- Occupation: Sculptor

Kathy Temin (born 1968) is an Australian artist who uses synthetic fur to create sculptural objects and installations. She is represented in a number of public collections in Australia and New Zealand and is a professor and Head of Fine Art at Monash University in Melbourne.

== Artistic Practice ==
Temin has described how exposure to her father's work as a tailor work helped her to learn the sewing and craft techniques that she later utilised in her art. Temin predominantly works with faux fur. Temin says that she uses this fabric, which is associated with children's toys, to generate an emotional response. Writing on Frieze.com, Kit Wise has described the appearance of her sculptural works as "roughly cobbled together or misshapen, deliberately undercutting any idealism associated with the art object and positing instead something far more anxious and awkward." Writing for the Sydney Morning Herald on the Royal Academy of Arts show "Australia" in London, esteemed Australian art critic John MacDonald referred to Temin's work simply as "three large furry things."

Temin has also worked with other textiles such as felt.

== Notable works ==
Temin's work 'My Monument: White Forest’ in QAGOMA's collection drew the attention of Kanye West and Kim Kardashian when searching for inspiration for an installation for their annual Christmas party. Kardashian and West contacted Temin through her dealer, Anna Schwartz Gallery, and commissioned Temin to create a "sculptural landscape" in their home. Kardashian described the works as "a winter wonderland Whoville", whilst Ashley Greeg described them as "fuzzy Whoville beanbags" in reference to scenes from the famous children's author Dr. Seuss.

Temin has also done a series of works about the Australian pop star Kylie Minogue, and the phenomenon of fandom culture.

== Public collections ==
- Art Gallery of Western Australia, Perth
- Gold Coast City Art Gallery, Brisbane
- Govett Brewster Art Gallery, New Plymouth
- Monash University Gallery Collection, Melbourne
- Queensland Art Gallery, Brisbane
- University of Wollongong, Wollongong
