= Victor Wang (artist) =

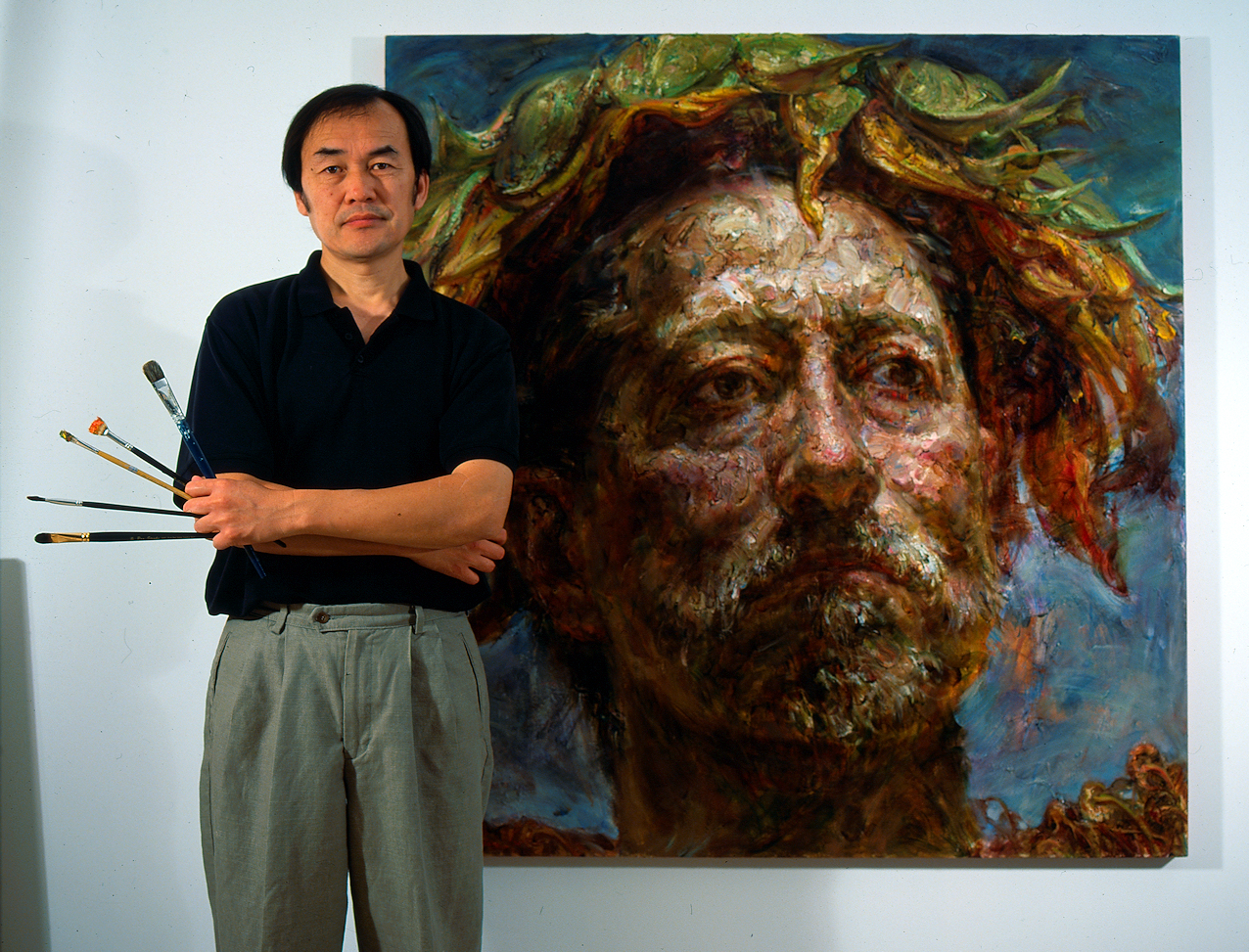
Wang in 2005 with his painting, A Sunflower Crown

Victor Sheng Wang (born 1956) is a Chinese American realist painter and Professor of Arts at Fontbonne University, where he received the Joan Goostree Stevens Excellence in Teaching Award, which recognizes the "outstanding teachers who contribute to Fontbonne's learning environment."

== Early life and education ==
Wang was born in Qiqihar, China. He completed high school in Qiqihar.

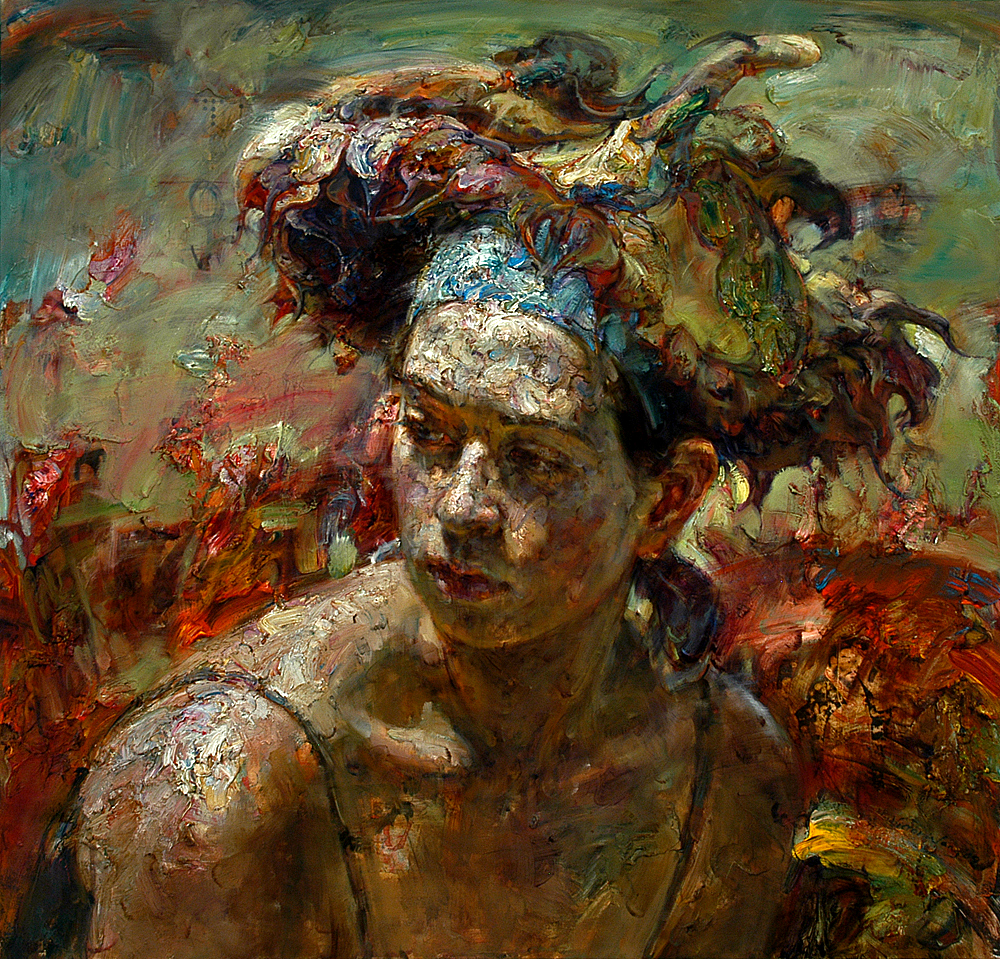
Pink Autumn, oil on canvas

== Career ==
Wang left China for the US in 1987 after working in agricultural labor in China, where he was confined by Maoist's Cultural Revolution. Based in St. Louis, MO, his art has been exhibited in cities in the US and beyond. He has been a visiting scholar at the School of Art and Design, University of Illinois at Urbana-Champaign.

He started a graduate program at Washington University in St. Louis but later transferred to Fontbonne University, where he graduated with a Master of Fine Arts degree. In 2011, he received the Professional Achievement Award.

Wang wrote the books Memoir of Sunflower (2009) and Three Major Traditional Techniques of Oil Painting.

He is a professor of arts at Fontbonne University.
