= Geoffrey Lemprière =

Australian woolbuyer and soldier

Geoffrey Lemprière OBE
- Born: 3 May 1904; Elsternwick, Victoria
- Died: 20 March 1977 (aged 72); Shearwater, Tasmania

Geoffrey Raoul Lemprière OBE (3 May 1904 – 20 March 1977) was an Australian woolbuyer and soldier.

He was born at Elsternwick, the eldest son of woolbroker Audley Raoul Lemprière and Adelaide Maude, née Greene. His father was a grandson of Thomas Lempriere. He attended Grange Hill Open Air School in Sandringham and Geelong Grammar School before studying in Switzerland at L'Ecole de Commerce in Neuchâtel. After a period in Europe he returned to Australia and was elected a director of his father's firm, A. R. Lemprière Pty Ltd, when the latter died in 1931. He was based in Belgium during this period, but returned to Australia when World War II broke out. After twelve months in the Australian Imperial Force he transferred to the Royal Australian Air Force in July 1941 and was posted to Rabaul. During the evacuation of New Britain he was captured by the Japanese and sent to a prisoner of war camp in Japan; he was mentioned in despatches for his conduct as a prisoner of war.

He resumed his old position after the war, but retired in 1955. After a period on the Australian trade mission to India, he settled in Tasmania and became state president of the Liberal Party, serving on its federal executive from 1961 to 1965. Appointed Officer of the Order of the British Empire in 1969, Lemprière died at Shearwater in 1977. He never married. His brothers William and Peter were also well-known wool buyers, while artist Helen Lempriere (whose maternal family was that of singer Nellie Melba) was his cousin.
