= Rebecca Cummins =

American photographer and professor

Rebecca Cummins is a photographer and multi-media artist living in Seattle, Washington.

She was awarded the Chancellor's Award from the University of Technology, Sydney and the outstanding University 2003 PhD dissertation titled Necro-Techno: Examples from an Archeology of Media. She is a professor of art at the University of Washington.

Her work has been exhibited at the Exploratorium in San Francisco. One of her pieces was used as cover art for Jake Seniuk's book, Strait Art.
