= Hany Armanious =

Australian artist (born 1962)

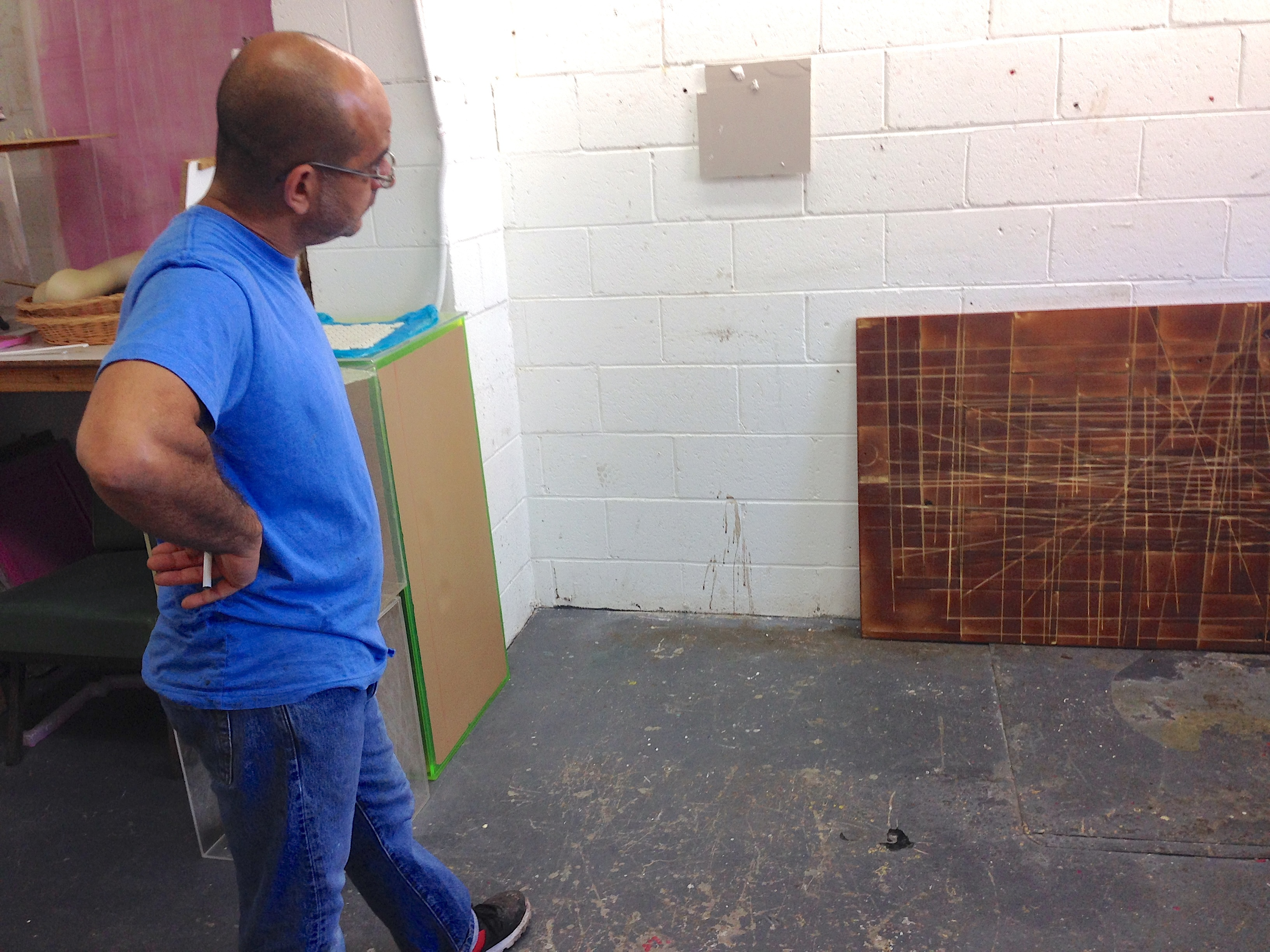
- Hany Armanious in his Sydney studio, 2013
- Born: 1962 (age 63–64); Ismailia, Egypt
- Education: Bachelor of Arts (Visual Arts) degree, City Art Institute, Sydney.
- Known for: Installations, sculpture and painting

Hany Armanious (born 1962) is an Egyptian born, Australian artist who lives and works in Sydney. Armanious produces installations and sculptural forms, as well as paintings and drawings.

== Life and work ==
Hany Armanious was born in Ismailia, Egypt and migrated to Australia with his family at the age of 6. He completed his schooling in Australia and holds a Bachelor of Arts (Visual Arts) degree from the City Art Institute, Sydney and a doctorate in Creative Arts from the University of Wollongong.) Since 2019 he has been Head of Sculpture at the National Art School in Sydney, New South Wales, Australia. In the early nineties Armanious considered a ‘key figure’ in a number of artists who critics noted as being influenced by the grunge movement.

Although born in Egypt and conscious of its cultural ties, Armanious’s work does not specifically reference that culture. He has been described as an artist who can 're-describe objects' using ‘poor materials’. As his practice has developed Armanious has achieved this goal through making moulds of ordinary objects and replicating them as parts of completed works. As Armanious has himself said, ‘…my interest in casting partly grew from a technique in my painting that utilized contact prints. Casting is like three-dimensional printmaking.“ Casting has now become central; to Armanious’s work and a ‘key strategy’ that allows him to bring almost any object that catches his eye into the studio and via casting to the exhibition space ‘refiguring elements and processes both literally and metaphorically’. In constructing and assembling his cast sculptures Armanious infuses and even ‘exploits’ the humorous potential brought to play on his work through the human need to find meaning within complicated and even abstract forms - the isomorphic condition that prompts us to find images and meaning in inkblots, clouds and other abstract combinations. The success of this idea can be seen in Australian art critic Rex Butler's descriptions of three plastic shopping bags Armanious presented as the work Ladybug (Pornament) in 1993. Butler looks at the work and questions whether they resemble a green skirt and white blazer, inverted pantyhose, or perhaps ‘a man crucified head down and arms wide like St. Peter’.

== Exhibitions ==
Armanious has shown with a number of dealer galleries and currently exhibits with Michael Lett in Auckland, Fine Arts, Sydney and Southard Reid in London. He has also shown with Foxy Production in New York, Sarah Cottier Gallery and Roslyn Oxley9 Gallery in Sydney, Galleria Raucci/Santamaria, Naples and the Galerie Allen in Paris.

Selected exhibitions in public art institutions:

- The Readymade Boomerang; Certain Relations in 20th-century Art (group) 8th Biennale of Sydney. 1990 Artistic Director René Block focussed on Duchamp and the power of the readymade on 20th century art.
- Perspecta (group) Art Gallery of New South Wales, Sydney. 1991 Curated by Victoria Lynn.
- The Boundary Rider 9th Biennale of Sydney (group). 1992 Artistic Director: Anthony Bond.
- Wit’s end Museum of Contemporary Art Sydney. 1993 (group) Curated by Kay Campbell.
- Aperto ’93 at the 45th Venice Biennale 1993 (group). Directed by Achille Bonito Oliva.
- Plastic Fantastic (group) Museum of Contemporary Art, Sydney. 1993
- Aussemblage (group) Auckland City Gallery, New Zealand. 1994
- Johannesburg Biennale (group) South Africa. 1995
- Möet and Chandon Touring Art (group) Prize National Gallery of Australia, Canberra. 1998 Touring all state galleries. Armanious was the 1998 Fellow. Armanious was also included in the 2000 edition of the Möet et Chandon Fellows Exhibition at Art Gallery of New South Wales, Sydney.
- Hammer Projects: Hany Armanious Hammer Museum Los Angeles. 2001
- Fieldwork: Australian Art 1968 – 2002 (group) National Gallery of Victoria, 2002 Federation Square, Melbourne.
- Bloom mutation, toxicity and the sublime. (group) Govett Brewster Art Gallery, New Plymouth, New Zealand. 2003
- National Sculpture Prize 2005 (group) National Gallery of Australia, Canberra. 2005
- Hany Armanious: Artists Project Auckland Art Gallery. 2005
- Before the Body-Matter (group) Monash University Museum of Art, Melbourne. 2006
- Uncanny Nature Australia Centre of Contemporary Art, Melbourne. 2006 Curated by Rebecca Coates.
- Busan Biennale (group) Korea. 2006
- Hany Armanious: Morphic Resonance City Gallery, Wellington and Institute of Modern Art, Brisbane 2007. The exhibition title comes from biologist Rupert Sheldrake’s theory around the ‘unseen interconnectedness of things’.
- Hany Armanious Contemporary Art Museum ST Louis, United States of America. 2008
- Ceramica (group) Institute of Contemporary Art, Sydney. 2008
- Before and After Science Adelaide Biennale. 2010 (group) Curated by Charlotte Day and Sarah Tutton, Art Gallery of South Australia, Adelaide.
- The Golden Thread (2011) at The fifty- fourth Venice Biennale. 2011 Armanious was the Australian representative at the 54th Biennale his work examining, ‘the relationship between the readymade and figurative sculptural traditions’.
- Mutatis Mutandis (group) Secession, Vienna. 2012
- Hany Armanious’s Fountain Museum of Contemporary Art Sydney. 2013 Armanious’s installation was the Inaugural Museum of Contemporary Art Sculpture the first in a series of commissions on the MCA’s new Loti Smorgon Sculpture Terrace. The sculpture was based on an anatomical model of the inner ear.
- Future Eaters (group) MUMA (Monash University Museum of Art), Melbourne. 2017
- Hany Amanious Stone Soup Henry Moore Foundation. 2024
- Hany Amanious Stone Soup Buxton Contemporary, Melbourne. 2025

=== Note ===
For a full list of Hany Armanious exhibitions go here

== Collections ==
- Art Gallery of New South Wales
- Chartwell Collection
- Heide
- National Gallery of Australia
- MCA
- Queensland Art Gallery
- National Gallery of Victoria
- Monash University Gallery
- Museum of Contemporary Art, San Diego
- Auckland City Art Gallery Toi o Tamaki
- Dunedin Public Art Gallery

== Awards ==
1998 Moët et Chandon fellowship

2004 Artist in residence, Elam School of Fine Arts International Arts Residency Programme, Auckland.
