= Oi Choong =

Australian landscape architect and urban designer

Oi Choong is an Australian landscape architect and urban designer, and a Fellow of the Australian Institute of Landscape Architects.

== Biography ==
Oi Choong completed a Bachelor of Architecture at the University of Sydney, as well as graduate diplomas in both Landscape Design (UNSW) and Environmental Studies (Macquarie University).

== Professional career ==
Oi Choong was appointed as Head of Environmental Design and Landscape in the NSW Government Architect’s Office in 1986, which at the time, was one of the largest landscape practices in Australia. During her leadership, she helmed the project team designing significant waterfront public spaces for the Circular Quay West redevelopment.

In 1990, Choong co-founded the award-winning landscape design practice, Context, with Bill Morrison and Darrel Conybeare, and led the firm until 2014.

in 1994, she was appointed by the Olympic Coordination Authority to a team of architects preparing the masterplan for the 2000 Sydney Olympics site, leading to the creation of the Millennium Parklands at Homebush Bay, now Sydney Olympic Park, NSW.

Since 2014, she has practiced as a freelance consultant involved in industry panels, projects and advisory work for government bodies.

Throughout her career, Choong has been involved in landscape architecture education in NSW, and participated on juries and award panels as a National Councillor of the Australian Institute of Architects.

== Awards ==
In 2018, Oi Choong was awarded the Marion Mahony Griffin Prize - a professional acknowledgement by the NSW Chapter of the Australian Institute of Architects, awarded annually to recognise a female architect for a distinctive body of architectural work. The award recognised her involvement in significant landscape and architectural projects in Australia, South East Asia, China, and the UAE across a 25-year career.

== See also ==
- Context
- NSW Government Architect’s Office
