= M Woods Museum =

Art museum in Beijing, China

Coordinates: 39.98413°N 116.49609°E

M Woods Museum is an independent, not-for-profit art museum founded in 2014 by collectors Lin Han and Wanwan Lei, which opened to the public in the autumn of 2014, and is located in Beijing's 798 Art Zone. The M WOODS 798 site is housed in a former munitions factory in Beijing's 798 art district, and in 2019 M WOODS opened its second museum space, M WOODS Art Community, located in the city's historic Dongcheng district. Regarding the origin of the museum's name, Lin Han told Asian Art in a 2016 interview that "M is the initial of my mother's given name, Miao. Woods is a play on the English translation of the Mandarin character for Lin which means wood or forest."

In addition to exhibitions of the M Woods permanent collection, the museum presents a year-round program of exhibitions, performances, music, education, live events and talks that situate contemporary art at the heart of the city and beyond. M Woods was granted official non-profit status by the Chinese government in 2015. Also in 2015, art collector Michael Xufu Huang joined as co-founder at the age of 22.

In September 2019, Michael Xufu Huang announced his resignation and withdrawal of his collection from M WOODS Museum. Huang will open a separate museum (X Museum) in March 2020.

In 2019 Victor Wang was appointed the museum's first Artistic Director and Chief Curator.

== Collection ==
According to an interview with Vogue, the M Woods permanent collection contains over 300 works of classic and contemporary art that include Tang dynasty statues, tantric paintings, works by Firenze Lai, Ouyang Chun, Raoul De Keyser, Giorgio Morandi, Guido van der Werve, and Olafur Eliasson.
