= Claire Healy and Sean Cordeiro =

Australian collaborative artists

Claire Healy (born 1971) and Sean Cordeiro (born 1974) are a partnership of contemporary Australian artists best known for their large-scale installations. They have exhibited in Japan, the United States, Singapore, Malaysia, Germany and across Australia. They won the 2022 Sir John Sulman Prize for Raiko and Shuten-dōji.

== Career ==
Healy was born in Melbourne. She met Sean Cordeiro at the University of New South Wales while completing a Bachelor of Fine Arts in 1997. They began exhibiting collaboratively in 2001 and both went on to complete a Master of Fine Arts in 2004. They were founding members of the artist-run space Imperial Slacks in Sydney which ran from 1999 to 2003. They currently live in the Blue Mountains.

Healy and Cordeiro are best known for their large-scale installations and site-specific works that often encompass found materials. Their work is held in the collections of the Museum of Contemporary Art and Newcastle Art Gallery.

== Awards ==
- 1996 The Union Steel Award
- 1997 Dr Gene Sherman Award, Sherman Galleries
- 2000 Australian Post Graduate Award
- 2022 Sir John Sulman Prize winners for Raiko and Shuten-dōji
