= Sifang Art Museum =

Museum in Nanjing, Jiangsu, China

The Sifang Art Museum, previously known as 4Cube Museum of Contemporary Art is a museum in Nanjing, in Jiangsu Province, China. It is a non-profit, private, multi-functional institution dedicated to the exhibition, preservation, research, and education of contemporary art and architecture. In 2013, it opened its new premises, designed and built by American architect Steven Holl. The new premises feature a 3000-square metre flexible exhibition area, as well as a teahouse and a residency for the curator. It forms part of the Sifang Parkland, formerly known as the China International Practical Exhibition of Architecture (CIPEA).
