= Lauren Brincat =

Australian artist (born 1980)

Lauren Brincat (born 1980) is an Australian contemporary artist and she works with multiple mediums including sculpture installations, moving image, and performance. Collaboration with other artists and cross disciplinary practice is a notable feature of her artistic approach. Her installations often encourage audience interaction.

Brincat's works are held in the multiple institutions including the Art Gallery of NSW, Museum of Contemporary Art Australia, and the Art Gallery of Western Australia. Brincat's work Salt lines: play it as it sounds was installed at the Carriageworks Arts Centre as part of the 2016 Sydney Bienalle. In 2019 she was co-commissioned by the MCA and Landcom as part of the C3West program to create a living sculpture work titled The Plant Library.

Brincat graduated from Sydney College of the Arts in 2006 with a Masters of Visual Arts.

== Notable works ==
=== Solo works ===
- Hear This, Museum of Contemporary Art, Australia, 2011.
- Shine on you crazy diamond, Museum of Old and New Art, Festival of Modern Art, Hobart, 2010 & Next Wave Federation Square Festival, Melbourne, 2010.
- Salt Lines: play it as it sounds, Sydney Biennale. Purchased by the Art Gallery of New South Wales, 2015–16.
- Walk the Line (companion piece to Salt Lines), Art Gallery of NSW, 2016.
- The Plant Library, Museum of Contemporary Art Sydney, 2019.
- ‘Slow Moving Waters’ at the TarraWarra Biennial, 2021.
- Women with Fringes etc. exhibition at the Anna Schwartz Gallery, 2022.

=== Collaborative works and group shows ===
- Embodied Acts: Live and Alive (part of) Contemporary Australia: Women, Queensland Art Gallery and Gallery of Modern Art, Brisbane, 2012.
- The Space Between Us: Anne Landa Award, Art Gallery of NSW, 2013
- Sonic Social, Museum of Contemporary Art Australia, 2014.
- Other Tempo: Liveworks, Carriageworks, 2019.
- ‘Tutti Presto fff’ at the Sydney Opera House for Vivid Sydney, 2022.

== List of awards ==
- Australia Council for the Arts Emerging Artists Creative Australia Fellowship grant, 2012–14.
- Woollahra Small Sculpture prize finalist, 2017 & 2018.
