= Cruthers Collection of Women's Art =

Collection of artwork by women in Perth, Western Australia

Cruthers Collection of Women's Art is a collection of more than 700 artworks by Australian women, held at the University of Western Australia. It is the only public collection focused on women's art in Australia.

The Cruthers Collection was founded in 2007 following the donation by Sir James and Lady Sheila Cruthers of some 400 artworks and is named in recognition of their gift.

The collection includes artworks by Australian women artists from the 1890s to the present day, with Australian modernism, feminist and contemporary art being represented. There is a focus on "the artist and her work", where a portrait or self-portrait of an artist is supported by a non-portrait example of their work.

As of May 2019 there were 700 works in the collection.

== Exhibitions ==
- The Artist and her Work, selected artworks from the Cruthers Collection displayed at the Lawrence Wilson Art Gallery, University of Western Australia, 2019
- Artemis: No Second Thoughts: Reflections on the Artemis Women's Art Forum
- Country and colony
- Into the Light: The Cruthers Collection of Women's Art, also known as Look. Look again, exhibition and publication, 2012
