= Monteith =

Monteith or Menteith may refer to:

== People ==
- Alex Monteith (born 1977), new media artist
- Alexander C. Monteith (1902–1979), senior vice-president of the Westinghouse Electric Corporation
- Andrew Monteith (1823–1896), Canadian businessman and politician
  - John C. Monteith (1853–1940), Canadian politician and son of Andrew
  - Joseph Monteith (1865–1934), Canadian politician and son of Andrew
    - Jay Waldo Monteith (1903–1981), Canadian politician and son of Joseph
- Brian Monteith (born 1958), former Scottish politician
- Cory Monteith (1982–2013), Canadian actor
- Dermott Monteith (1943–2009), Irish cricketer
- Hazel Monteith (1917–2012), Jamaican Senator, social worker and radio personality
- Henry Ruthven Monteith (1848–1922), American professor at the University of Connecticut
- Jimmie W. Monteith (1917–1944), United States Army officer awarded the Medal of Honor
- John Monteith (minister) (1788–1868), founder of University of Michigan
- John Monteith (1929–2012), Scottish Royal Society fellow
- Kelly Monteith (1943–2023), American comedian
- Ken Monteith (1938–2023), former Canadian politician
- Larry K. Monteith (born 1933), American electrical engineer and academic leader
- Monteith and Rand, 1979 comedy team
- Ray Monteith (born 1920), Canadian politician
- Robert Monteith (politician) (1812–1884) DL, JP, Scottish politician and philanthropist
  - Joseph Monteith (Deputy Lieutenant) (1852–1911) DL, JP, son of Robert Monteith of Carstairs
- Robert Monteith of Salmonet (1603–1660), colourful character who abandoned his role as a Presbyterian minister to join the Roman Catholic Church
- Robert Monteith (umpire) (1937–1988), New Zealand cricket umpire
- Scott Monteith (artist), American artist
- William Monteith (1790–1864), British soldier and historian
- Walter E. Monteith (1878–1952), American politician and jurist

== Places ==
=== Australia ===
- Monteith, Glebe, a heritage-listed house in Sydney, New South Wales
- Monteith, South Australia

=== Canada ===
- McMurrich/Monteith, Ontario, a Canadian municipality
- Monteith, community in Iroquois Falls, Ontario
  - Monteith Correctional Complex, a medium-security prison in Monteith

=== United Kingdom ===
- Menteith or Monteith, a district of south Perthshire, Scotland
- Carstairs House or Monteith House, a country house in South Lanarkshire
- Lake of Menteith, Scotland
- Monteith, County Down, a village in Northern Ireland

== Other uses ==
- monteith (bowl), a cooler for wine glasses (or punchbowl), usually in silver
- Camp Monteith, Kosovo military base
- Monteith Hall (disambiguation), multiple places
- Monteith's, a brand of beer, brewed in Greymouth, New Zealand on the west coast of the South Island

== See also ==
- Thomas and Walter Monteith House, built by the founders of Albany, Oregon
