= Robert Monteith =

Robert Monteith may refer to:

- Robert Monteith (politician) (1812–1884), Scottish politician and philanthropist
- Robert Monteith (umpire) (1937–1988), New Zealand cricket umpire
- Robert Monteith of Salmonet (1603–1660), colourful character who abandoned his role as a Presbyterian minister to join the Roman Catholic Church
