= Low Moor, Virginia =

- Census-designated place
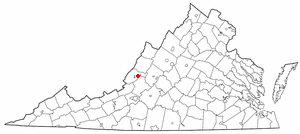
- Location of Low Moor, Virginia
- Coordinates: 37°47′32″N 79°52′36″W
- Country: United States
- State: Virginia
- County: Alleghany

Area
  - Total: 0.85 sq mi (2.2 km^{2})
  - Land: 0.81 sq mi (2.1 km^{2})
  - Water: 0 sq mi (0.0 km^{2})
- Elevation: 1,122 ft (342 m)

Population (2010)
  - Total: 258
  - Density: 320/sq mi (120/km^{2})
- Time zone: UTC−5 (Eastern (EST))
  - Summer (DST): UTC−4 (EDT)
- ZIP code: 24457
- Area code: 540
- FIPS code: 51-47352
- GNIS feature ID: 1493232

Low Moor is a census-designated place (CDP) in Alleghany County, Virginia, United States. As of the 2020 census, Low Moor had a population of 402.

== History ==
Low Moor was the birthplace of World War II Medal of Honor recipient Jimmie Monteith, for whom Camp Monteith, located in Kosovo, was named.

It is also home to Alleghany Regional Hospital.

== Geography ==
Low Moor is located at 37°47′32″N 79°52′36″W (37.792094, −79.876604), off Interstate 64, between Covington and Clifton Forge.

According to the United States Census Bureau, the CDP has a total area of 0.8 square mile (2.1 km^{2}), of which 0.8 square mile (2.1 km^{2}) is land and 0.04 square mile (0.1 km^{2}) (2.41%) is water.

== In popular culture ==
- Low Moor was a fictional location in the premiere episode of The X-Files miniseries, first airing on January 24, 2016.

== Demographics ==
Historical population
Census	Pop.	Note	%±
2010	258		—
2020	402		55.8%
U.S. Decennial Census; 2000 2010 2020

Low Moor was first listed as a census designated place in the 2000 U.S. census.

As of the census of 2000, there were 367 people, 150 households, and 106 families residing in the CDP. The population density was 450.4 people per square mile (174.9/km^{2}). There were 161 housing units at an average density of 197.6/sq mi (76.7/km^{2}). The racial makeup of the CDP was 95.64% White, 3.81% African American, 0.27% Native American, and 0.27% from two or more races.

There were 150 households, out of which 28.7% had children under the age of 18 living with them, 52.0% were married couples living together, 12.7% had a female householder with no husband present, and 29.3% were non-families. 26.0% of all households were made up of individuals, and 16.7% had someone living alone who was 65 years of age or older. The average household size was 2.45 and the average family size was 2.91.

In the CDP, the population was spread out, with 22.1% under the age of 18, 4.9% from 18 to 24, 30.2% from 25 to 44, 24.8% from 45 to 64, and 18.0% who were 65 years of age or older. The median age was 41 years. For every 100 females, there were 103.9 males. For every 100 females age 18 and over, there were 84.5 males.

The median income for a household in the CDP was $40,083, and the median income for a family was $41,406. Males had a median income of $29,531 versus $31,750 for females. The per capita income for the CDP was $18,982. About 6.6% of families and 8.8% of the population were below the poverty line, including none of those under age 18 and 15.5% of those age 65 or over.
