= Duddingston Kirk =

Church in Edinburgh, Scotland

Coordinates: 55°56′28.22″N 3°8′56.82″W

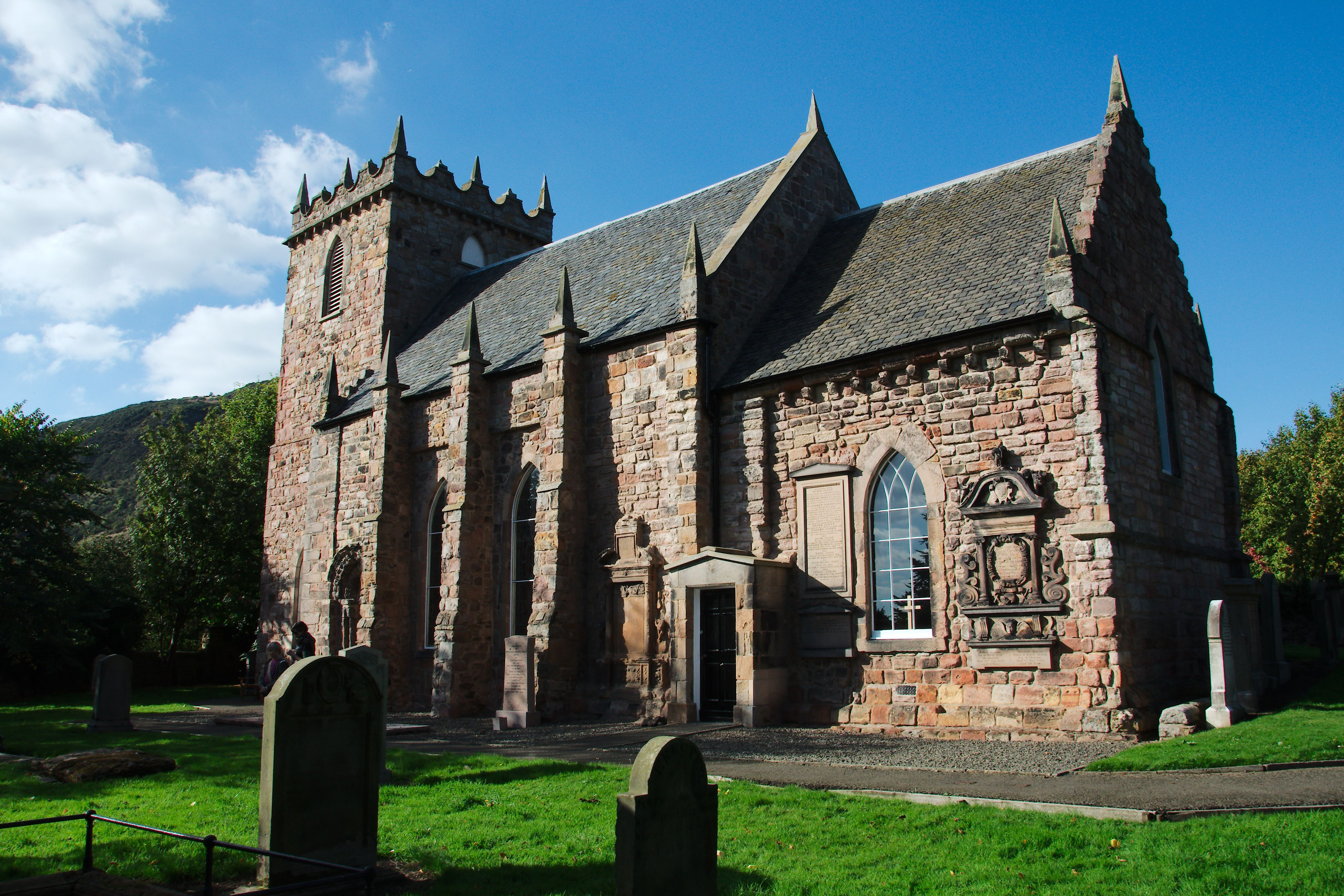
Duddingston Kirk

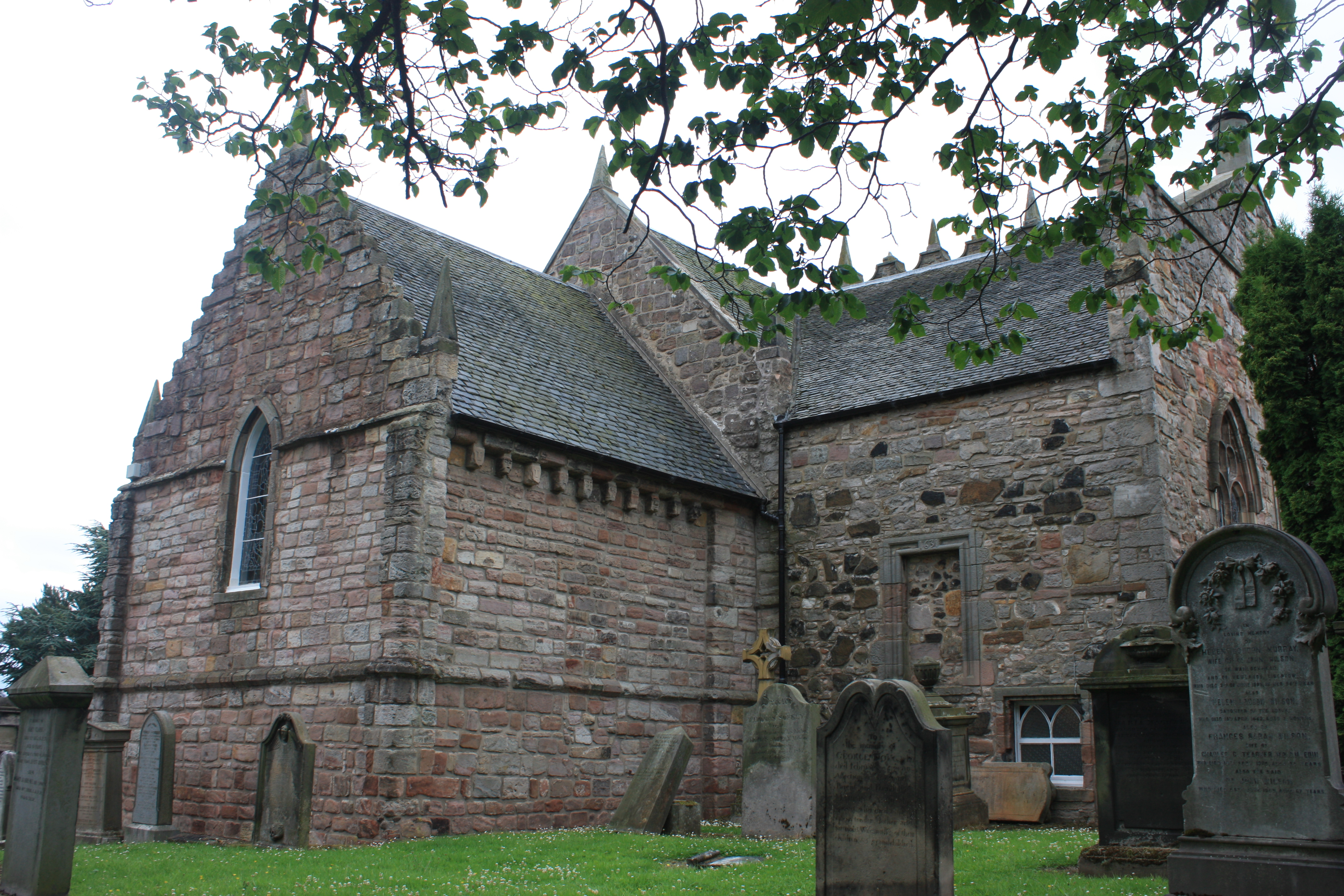
Duddingston Kirk from the north-east

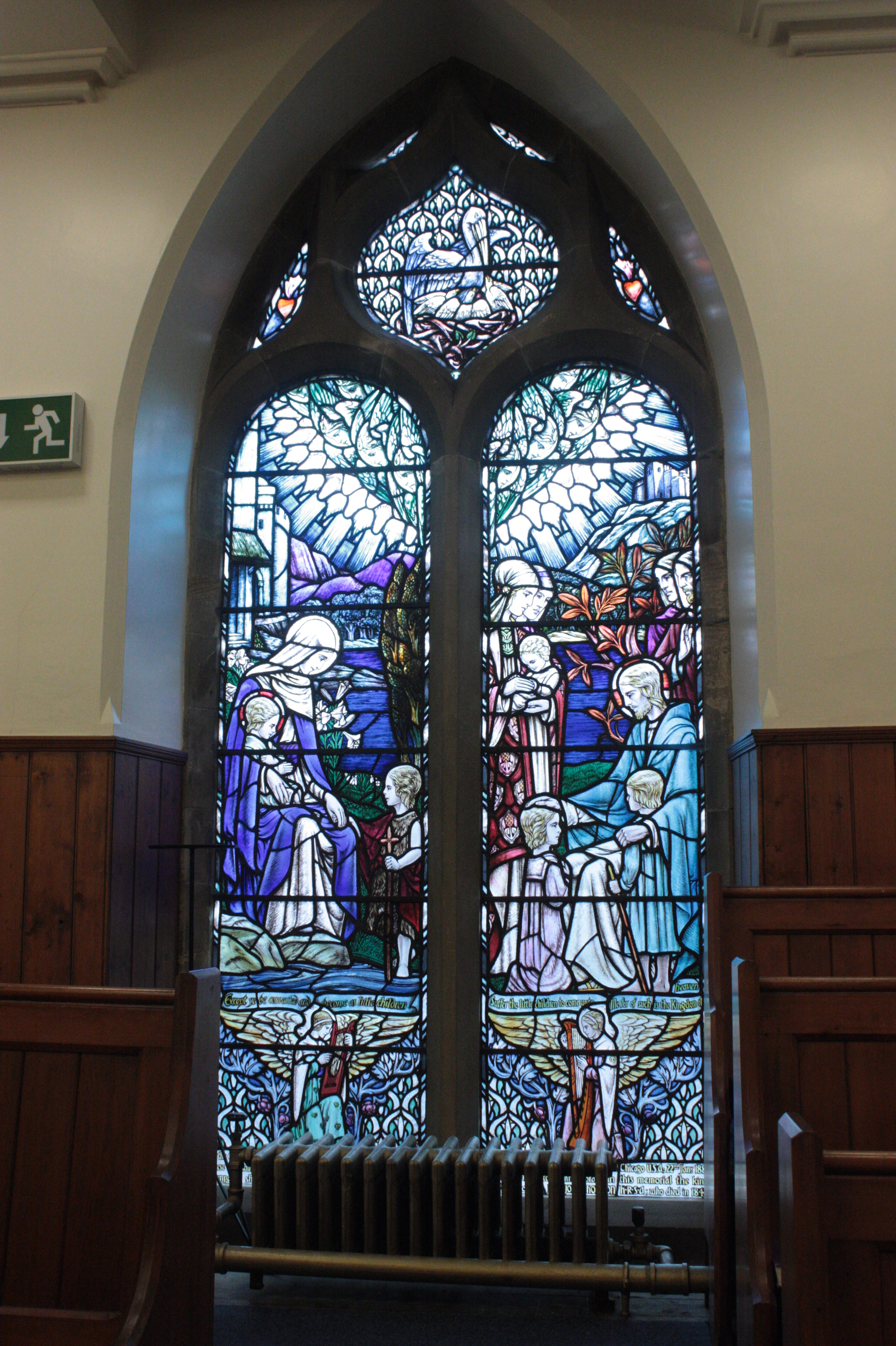
The memorial window to Joan Carfrae Pinkerton by Douglas Strachan

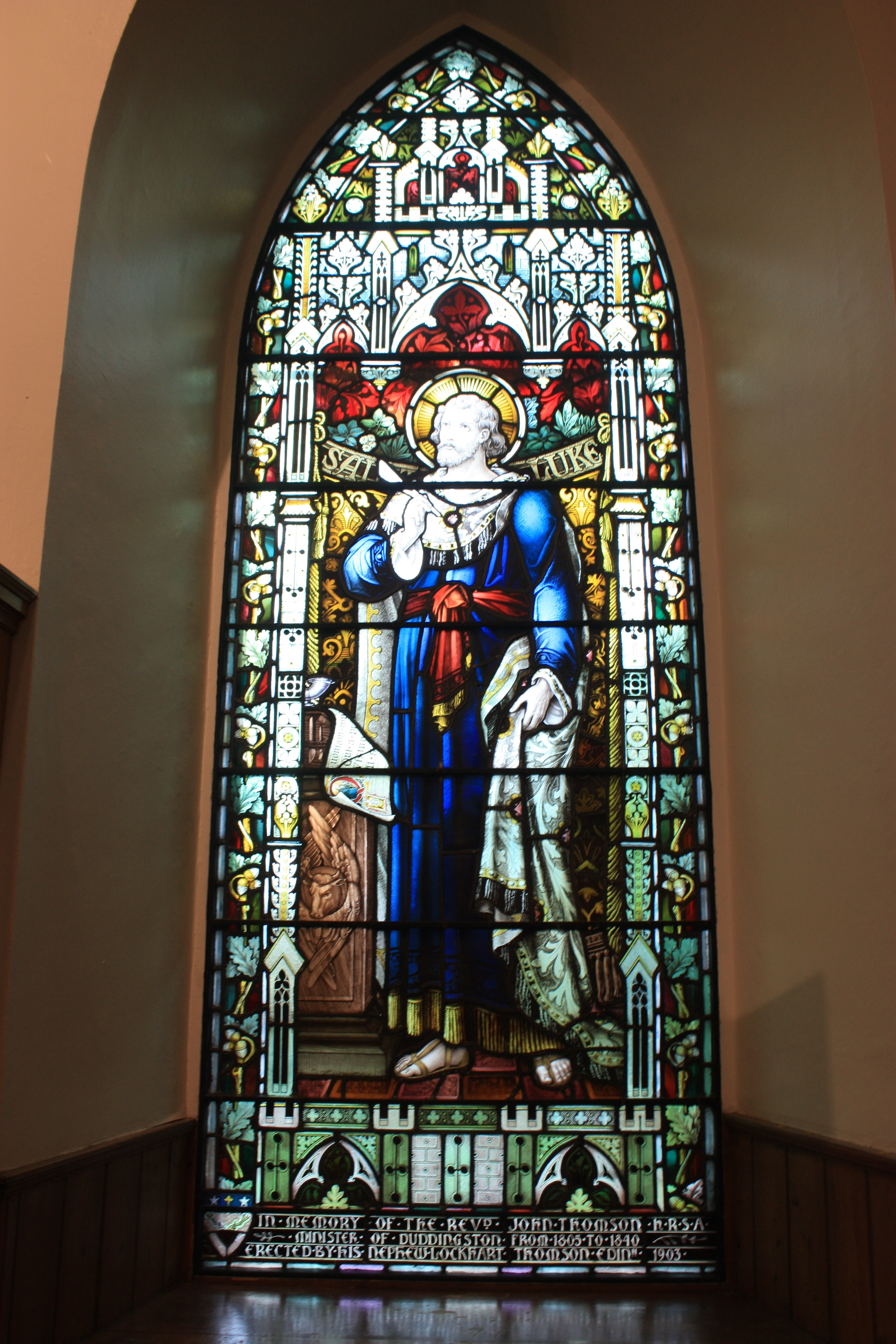
Memorial window to Rev John Thomson, Duddingston Kirk

Duddingston Kirk is a Parish Church in the Church of Scotland, located adjacent to Holyrood Park in Duddingston Village, on the east side of the City of Edinburgh. Regular services are held at the kirk.

== History ==
Cassel identifies the building as being Anglo-Saxon (i.e. pre Norman conquest).

The church was built in or around 1124 by Dodin, a Norman knight, on land granted to Kelso Abbey by King David I of Scotland. As originally built, the kirk consisted of the chancel, nave and square tower. The traditional pattern of an east–west axis was adopted. The original entrance on the south wall includes a particularly fine example of Scoto-Norman stone carving, with a round-topped doorway. Following the enlargement of the parish boundaries, the Prestonfield Aisle was added in 1631. This consists of a gallery, downstairs area and burial vaults were on the north side. In 1968 the kirk's interior was reconditioned, with the former pipe organ removed.

Given its proximity to central Edinburgh, Duddingston has long been a favourite location for many of the city's artists and professionals. The novelist Walter Scott was ordained an elder at Duddingston in 1806.

The kirk has also been used as a venue during the Edinburgh Festival Fringe.

== Ministers ==
From 1805–1840 the minister was the painter John Thomson.

He was replaced in 1841 by James Macfarlane.

Other ministers include Charles Lumsden and Robert Monteith of Salmonet in the 17th century, and Robert Pollock in the 18th century.

== Stained glass ==
The north triple window in the gallery, designed by Douglas Strachan, is dedicated to Joan Carfrae, wife of the security agency founder Allan Pinkerton.

The stained glass immediately east of the pulpit commemorates Stevenson Macadam, an elder in the church.

== Duddingston Kirkyard ==
Notable burials and memorials include:

- William Dick-Cunyngham VC (memorial only)
- David Thomas Ker Drummond
- Benjamin Duff Dunbar (1808-1897)
- James Macfarlane
- Mackintosh MacKay (1792-1873) Moderator of the General Assembly of the Free Church of Scotland in 1849
- Thomas Meik engineer
- James Browne LLD is apparently in the base of the church tower.
- John Thomson of Duddingston

== See also ==
- List of Church of Scotland parishes
