= Carstairs House Tramway =

Tramway in Scotland

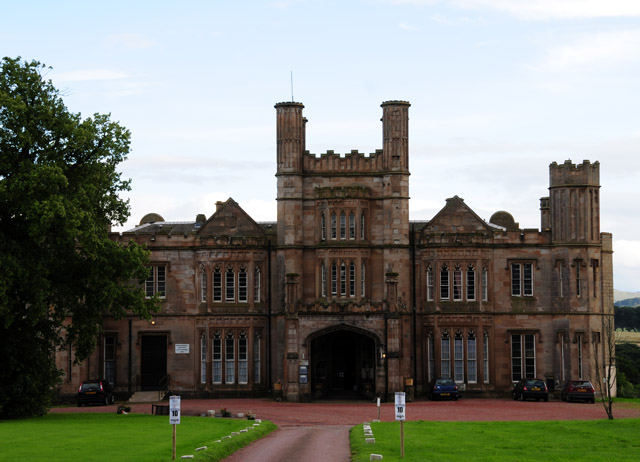
- Carstairs House, now called Monteith House

Operation
- Locale: Carstairs
- Open: ca.1888
- Close: ca.1895
- Status: Closed

Infrastructure
- Track gauge: 2 ft 6 in (762 mm)
- Propulsion system: Electric

Statistics
- Route length: 1 mile (1.6 km)

The Carstairs House Tramway operated between Carstairs railway station and Carstairs House between 1888 and 1895.

== History ==
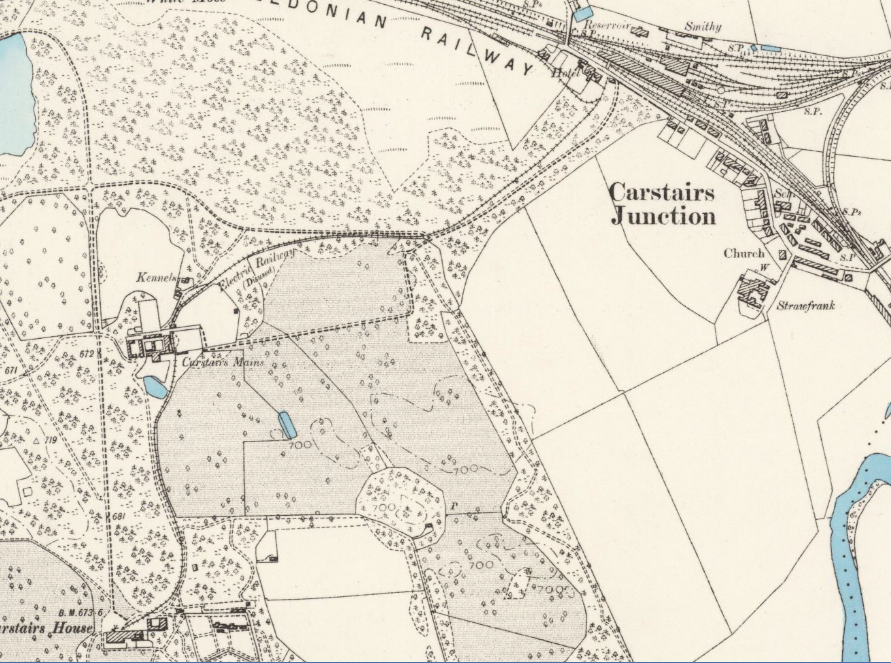
Map of the tramway published in 1898

The tramway was built by Joseph Monteith who owned Carstairs House. The construction engineers were Anderson and Munro, Electrical Engineers, 136 Bothwell Street, Glasgow.

Its purpose was to provide transport for his family and guests to and from Carstairs railway station. He pioneered the use of hydroelectric power, and constructed a power station to provide electricity for the house and tramway.

The system was described in the Leeds Times of Saturday 18 May 1889 as follows:

Scotland has so many waterfalls that it is not surprising to find a beginning made in utilising their power for electric railways. The residence of Mr. J. Monteith, Carstairs House, has recently been united to Carstairs Junction by an electric line one and a quarter mile long, running through the grounds of the mansion. Messrs Anderson and Munro, of Glasgow, are the engineers of the line, which is worked by the Cleghorn Falls, some three miles distant on the River Mouse.

A turbine transforms the power of the falls into electricity by means of a dynamo of the Goolden type, giving 400 volts and about 40 amperes. The current is carried on four bare copper wires run on poles and supported by liquid insulators. The metallic circuit is complete throughout, no earth connection being used. The conductors laid along the line consist of rectangular rods of very pure iron, placed, one on each side, about a foot from the rails. They are supported on special insulators on an elastic fastening of steel, which allows of no side oscillation, and permits the rods to expand freely. These insulators are in turn supported upon iron rods, 10in. high, and a handsome carriage, capable of running at a speed of 35 mile an hour, has been provided. The line can be run direct from the dynamo, or through the agency of accumulators, of which there is a supply at Carstairs House for the electric lighting installation. The line is built for private purposes, and chiefly for transit between the mansion and the railway station; but it can be used for farm and estate purposes, and has been arranged with branches and sidings to that end.

== Closure ==
Electric services probably ceased around 1895 and then the line was operated for goods traffic using horse power for a few more years. The remains of the tramway were sold in the 1930s.
