= Rosemary Laing =

Australian photographer

- Born: 1959; Brisbane, Queensland, Australia
- Died: 23 May 2024
- Occupation: Photographer

Rosemary Laing (1959 – 2024) was an Australian photographer.

Originally trained as a painter, Laing moved into the medium of photography for which she is most notable. Laing taught art at the University of New South Wales, College of Fine Arts.

With over 100 exhibitions, Laing was widely known for her leading role in the conceptual photography field, with most of her works being a part of a series in order to convey her concepts.

== Life ==
Laing was born and raised in Ashgrove, Brisbane. She began her schooling at Mater Dei Catholic Primary School and then attended Mount St Michael's College, before completing her final year at The Gap State High School. Originally trained as a painter, from 1976 to 1979 Laing completed a Diploma of Art Education at the Brisbane College of Advanced Education in Queensland. She then went on to get her Diploma of Art in 1982 from the University of Tasmania in Hobart. Eight years later, from 1990 to 1991, Laing gained a Post Graduate Diploma from the Sydney College of the Arts in Sydney. And then, from 1992 to 1996 she completed a Master of Fine Arts in Honours Class 1, from the College of Fine Arts, New South Wales.

Laing originally used photography as reference material. She gained a job as an exhibition consultant in 1988 for the Australian Bicentennial Exhibition. This proved a step forward for Laing and her career. Editing work from some of the top photographers from around the country enabled her to see how they decided to represent the country. In 2000 Laing had a breakthrough with the series Flight research.

On 24 May 2024, Tolarno Galleries announced that Laing had died at the age of 65 after a short illness.

== Work ==
Some of Laing's most noteworthy series include Bulletproof glass and Groundspeed. Bulletproof glass is a series of images shot on location in the Blue Mountains, featuring women dressed in vintage wedding dresses with gunshot wounds to the chest whilst 'floating' in the sky. Some specific negative ideas that fed into this series include the unsuccessful republican referendum in Australia, and the refusal by the Howard Government to apologise to the Aboriginal peoples of Australia. The series Groundspeed is a mix between an installation piece and photography. Laing visited the eucalyptus forests in South Australia and laid down carpet on the forest floor. With assistance Laing was able to produce multiple landscape images of the scene.
"Flight sits in our consciousness as a kind of fantasy or dream. It is a metaphorical notion. Children dream of flying. It is a very escapist notion to be able to fly. Superheroes fly. Then you’ve got Yves Klein’s Leap into the void. I was interested in unfettering the body from the mechanics of flight" -Rosemary Laing The effect that natural disasters had on the Australian landscape and the lives of those they affected influenced Laing to explore the ideas related to this through documentary photography. The series that arose from this exploration was titled one dozen unnatural disasters in the Australian landscape.

A vast majority of Laing's artworks related strongly to cultural and historical places throughout Australia. With staged sceneries, Laing involved the politics of particular locations as well as elements of current and modern culture. Laing became interested in flight in 1994 when she moved to a studio in the Sydney suburb of Leichhardt which was directly under the flight path. Her growing annoyance with the sounds from planes passing overhead fueled her interest in the ideas of air travel, which in turn was the inspiration for her Flight Research series.

From 1996 Laing generally avoided digitally manipulating any of her images, which is what made the subject matter in some of her images surreal.

== Awards and honours ==
In her career, Laing won multiple awards as well as research grants, including:

- 1999 National Photographic Purchase Award, from the Albury Wodonga Regional Art Foundation.
- 1996 Faculty Research Grant, from the College of Fine Arts, University of New South Wales
- 1990 Rothmans Foundation Postgraduate Scholarship, from the Sydney College of the Arts
- 1989 Artists Development Grant, Visual Arts/Craft Board of the Australia Council

== Exhibitions ==
Laing's work was exhibited in over 100 exhibitions since the 1980s, both individually and in a group. Laing had her works exhibited internationally, including in Germany, Australia, the United States, Spain, Japan, Switzerland, New Zealand and Finland. Her works are held at both national and international museum collections. These include the Museo Nacional Centro de Arte Reina Sofia in Madrid, Spain, the North Carolina Museum of Art in Raleigh, USA, the 21st Century Museum of Contemporary Art in Kanazawa, Japan, and many more.
