= List of listed buildings in Carstairs, South Lanarkshire =

This is a list of listed buildings in the parish of Carstairs in South Lanarkshire, Scotland.

== List ==
Name	Location	Date Listed	Grid Ref. (Note: Sometimes known as OSGB36, the grid reference (where provided) is based on the British national grid reference system used by the Ordnance Survey. • "Guide to National Grid". Ordnance Survey. • "Get-a-map". Ordnance Survey.)	Geo-coordinates	Notes	LB Number (Note: Historic Environment Scotland assign a unique alphanumeric identifier to each designated site in Scotland, for listed buildings this always begins with "LB", for example "LB12345".)	Image
93-97 (Odd Nos) Lanark Road, Carstairs Village				55°41′47″N 3°41′30″W	Category C(S)	6593	Upload Photo
Carstairs House, Mausoleum				55°40′48″N 3°40′16″W	Category B	6626	Upload another image See more images
Carstairs Mains Farmhouse And Steading				55°41′09″N 3°40′59″W	Category B	715	Upload Photo
Glebe House, Carstairs, Including Stable Block, Walls, Gatepiers, And Walled Garden				55°41′50″N 3°41′04″W	Category B	6643	Upload Photo
Parish Church And Graveyard				55°41′47″N 3°41′24″W	Category B	711	Upload Photo
Carstairs Village, 105 Lanark Road				55°41′47″N 3°41′28″W	Category B	716	Upload Photo
Carstairs House				55°40′51″N 3°41′04″W	Category A	712	Upload another image
Icehouse, Carstairs House				55°40′57″N 3°40′52″W	Category C(S)	713	Upload Photo
Lodge, Carstairs House				55°41′29″N 3°41′27″W	Category B	714	Upload Photo
Cranley House, Cleghorn, Lanark				55°42′04″N 3°43′01″W	Category C(S)	48529	Upload Photo
121 Lanark Road, Carstairs Village				55°41′49″N 3°41′25″W	Category C(S)	6594	Upload Photo

== Key ==
The scheme for classifying buildings in Scotland is:

- Category A: "buildings of national or international importance, either architectural or historic; or fine, little-altered examples of some particular period, style or building type."
- Category B: "buildings of regional or more than local importance; or major examples of some particular period, style or building type, which may have been altered."
- Category C: "buildings of local importance; lesser examples of any period, style, or building type, as originally constructed or moderately altered; and simple traditional buildings which group well with other listed buildings."

In March 2016 there were 47,288 listed buildings in Scotland. Of these, 8% were Category A, and 50% were Category B, with the remaining 42% being Category C.
