= Sydney College of the Arts =

Australian art school

Coordinates: 33°51′55″S 151°09′46″E

- Type: Public
- Established: 1974
- Location: Sydney, New South Wales, Australia
- Campus: Old Teachers' College, Camperdown
- Nickname: SCA
- Website: sydney.edu.au/sca/%20sydney.edu.au/sca

The Sydney College of the Arts (SCA) is a contemporary art school. It was a faculty of the University of Sydney from 1990 until 2017, when it became a school of the Faculty of Arts and Social Sciences. Until the end of 2019, the campus was located in Rozelle, Sydney, and housed within Callan Park in the Kirkbride complex, a cluster of sandstone buildings designed by James Barnet, the government architect, in the late 19th century. SCA moved to the main Camperdown Campus of the University of Sydney in 2020 and now occupies a substantial portion of the Old Teachers' College.

== History ==
The first cohort of 240 students (120 design students and 120 visual arts) commenced studying at Sydney College of the Arts in 1976, the College principal being the esteemed graphic designer Arthur Leydin. The Visual Arts students were based in a Campus at Smith and Mansfield Streets Balmain. The Design students were originally based in the 'Monteith' complex of buildings at 266 Glebe Point Road before moving to the old Lever and Kitchen building at Mansfield Street, White Bay in 1981. From 1981 to 1983 the Design part of the college, offering four study areas (Fashion & Textile Design, Interior Design, Industrial Design, Visual Communication), grew quickly and expanded into refurbished warehouses along Mansfield Street. Prior to 1981, the Design school of Sydney College of the Arts was located at Monteith, Glebe, with the Arts school at buildings on Smith and Mansfield Streets, in Balmain. It moved to the Kirkbride complex in 1992, after considerable wrangling with several Vice-Chancellors of the university.

From its inception in 1974, SCA established itself as a leading institution in visual arts teaching, with an emphasis on conceptual approaches to art practice, playing a central role in the growth and acceptance of artistic postmodernism in Australia. it was originally established as an independent College of Advanced Education before becoming part of Sydney University in 1990. Often referred to as the "artist's art school", it has had a long tradition of nurturing diversity of practice and opinion, with a distinguished list of teachers and alumni. On the measure of the number of successful and prominent art practitioners it has educated, SCA is in a position to claim that it is the most successful art school in Australia.

On 21 June 2016 the University of Sydney announced that the school would be merged with UNSW Art & Design, a plan that was later abandoned. On 22 August 2016 students occupied the Executive Administration Offices of SCA in protest against the closure of the art school and the ensuing job losses, and the move of SCA from its current home in Rozelle. The occupation ended on 25 October, making it the longest running student occupation in the University of Sydney's history.

From 2017, SCA began the process of rewriting its curriculum to suit broader-scale learning. In transitioning from a faculty to a department within the Faculty of Arts and Social Sciences, it has made its courses available to more students, while its students can access other departments and disciplines. It moved from Kirkbride to a new purpose-designed facility in the historic Old Teacher's College on the main campus of the university in 2020, making it the only art school to be housed in such close proximity to other schools and facilities in any university in Australia.

== Programs of study ==
- Ceramics – BVA, MFA, MCA, PhD
- Critical Studies – BVA, MFA, PhD
- Curating – MArtC, PhD
- Glass – BVA, MFA, MCA, PhD
- Jewellery and Object – BVA, MFA, MCA, PhD
- Painting – BVA, MFA, MCA, PhD
- Photomedia – BVA, MFA, MCA, PhD
- Printmedia – BVA, MFA, MCA, PhD
- Screen Arts – BVA, MFA, MMI, MCA, PhD
- Sculpture – BVA, MFA, MCA, PhD

== Notable alumni ==
- Catherine Martin
- Jane Campion
- Claudia Chan Shaw
- Fiona Lowry
- Cherry Hood
- Julie Fragar
- Peter Callas
- Maria Fernanda Cardoso
- Anne Ferran
- Fiona Foley
- John Gillies
- Shaun Gladwell
- Stavros Kazantzidis
- Jasper Knight
- Derek Kreckler
- Rosemary Laing
- Mikala Dwyer
- Marc Newson
- Scott Horscroft
- Simon Penny
- Debra Phillips
- Ben Quilty
- Michael Riley (artist)
- Cathy Wilcox
- Justene Williams
- John Zerunge Young
- Bin Xie
- Anne Zahalka
- Lindy Lee
- Geoffrey Maclean

== Notable current and past faculty ==
- David Ahern
- John Conomos
- Debra Dawes
- Tracey Moffatt
- Mike Parr
- Julie Rrap
- Imants Tillers
- Guy Warren
- John Wiliams
- Justene Williams

== SCA Campus ==
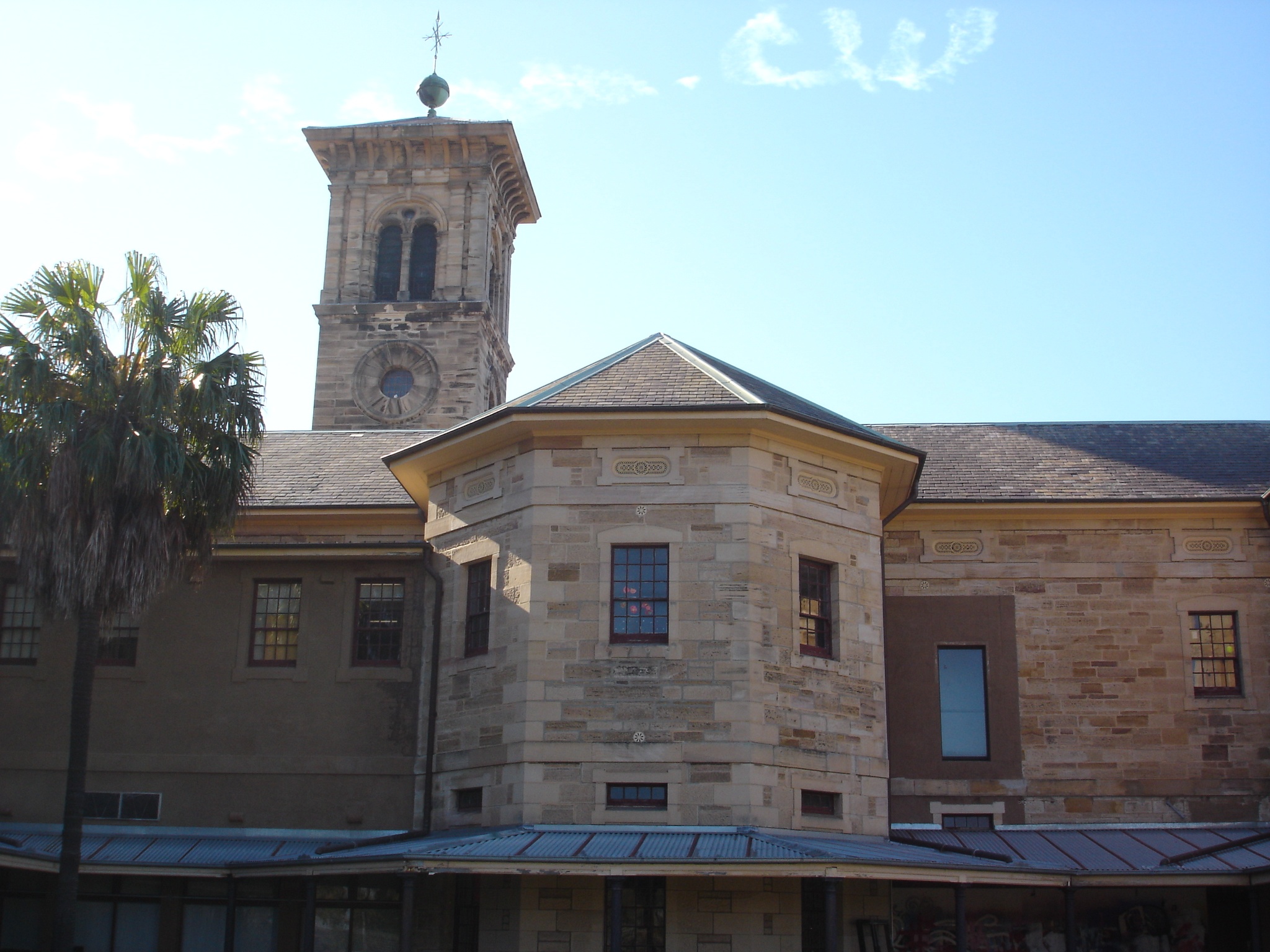
Part of the Kirkbride complex, formerly Callan Park psychiatric hospital

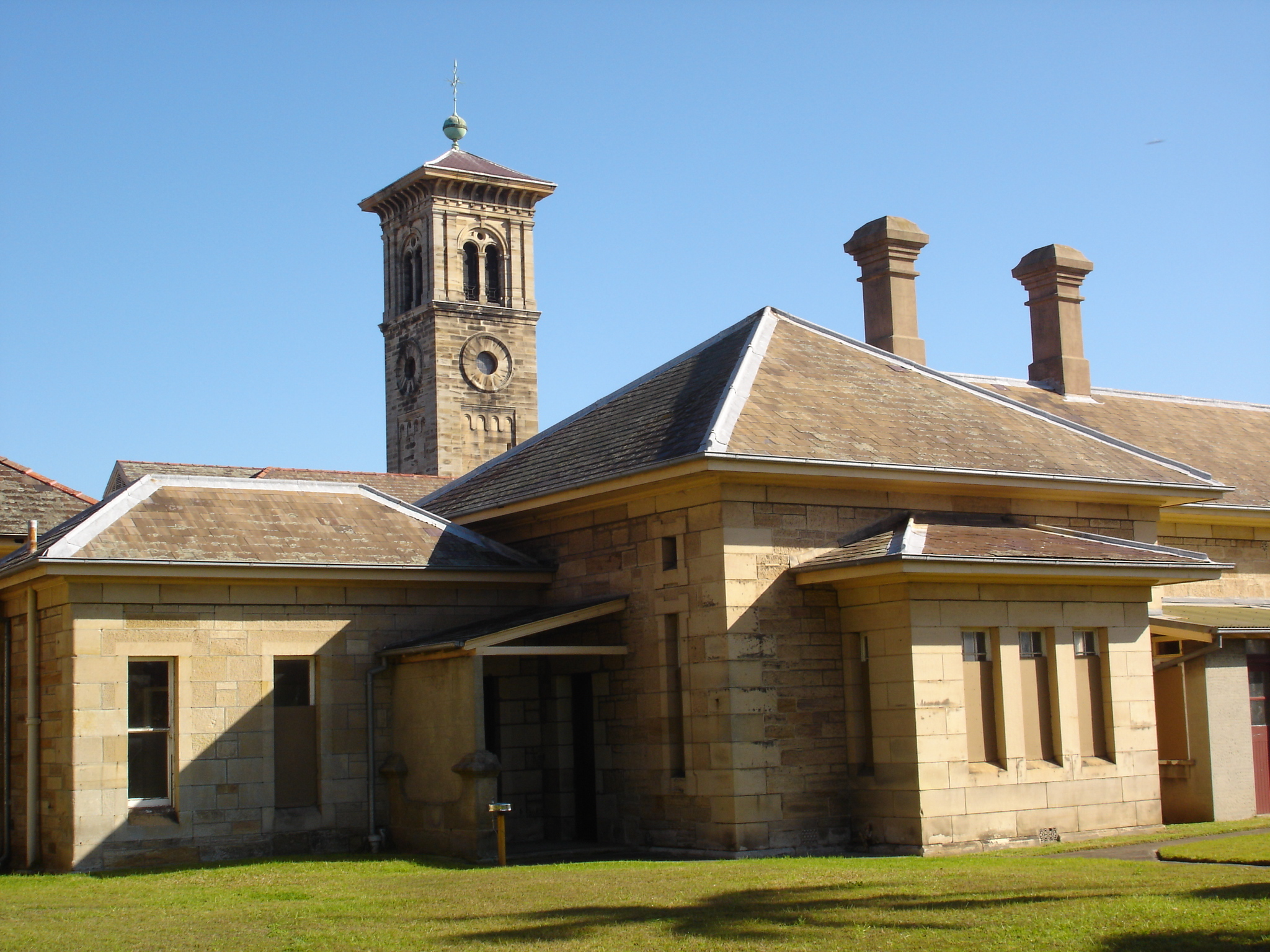
Kirkbride complex

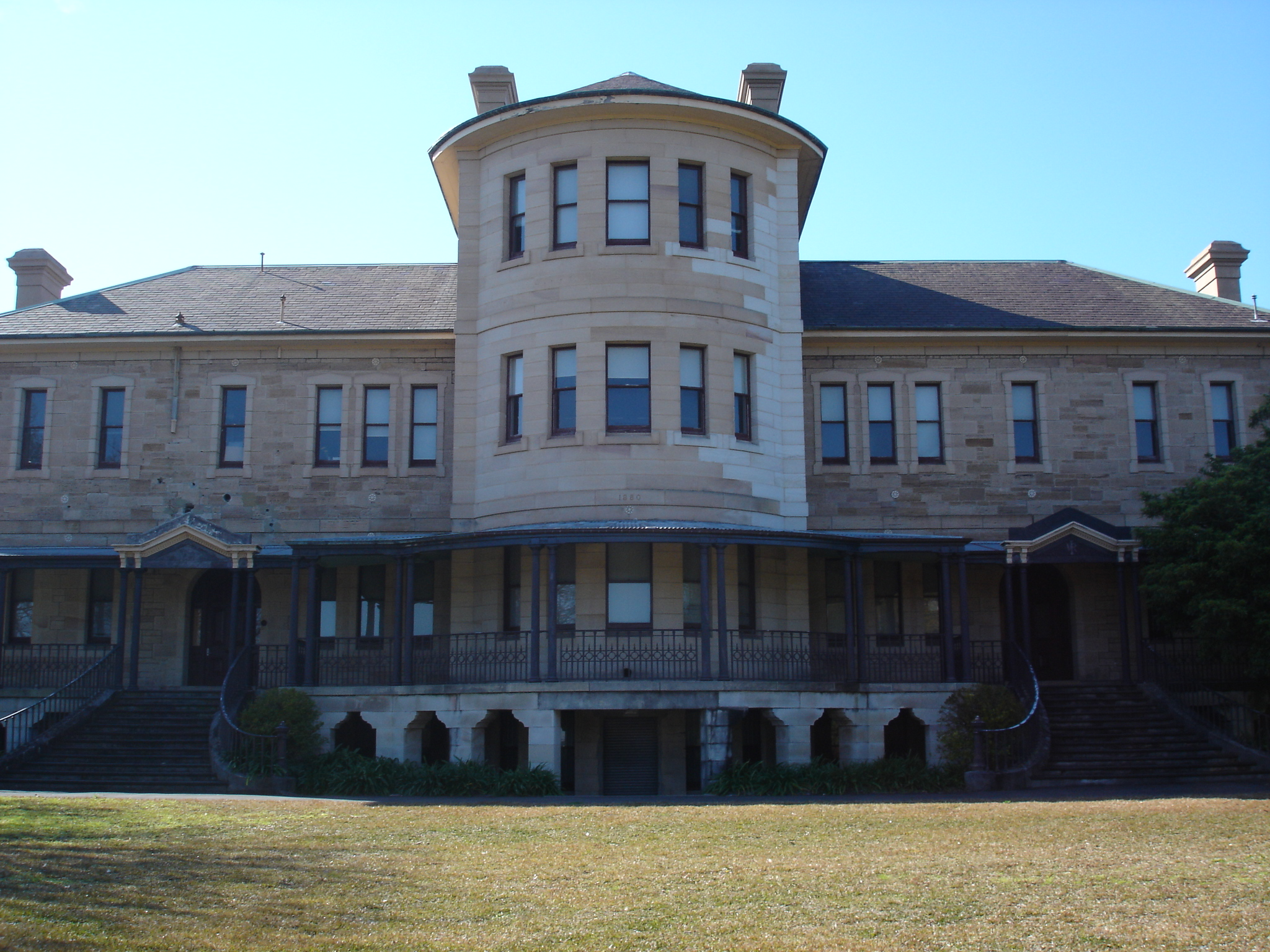
Kirkbride complex

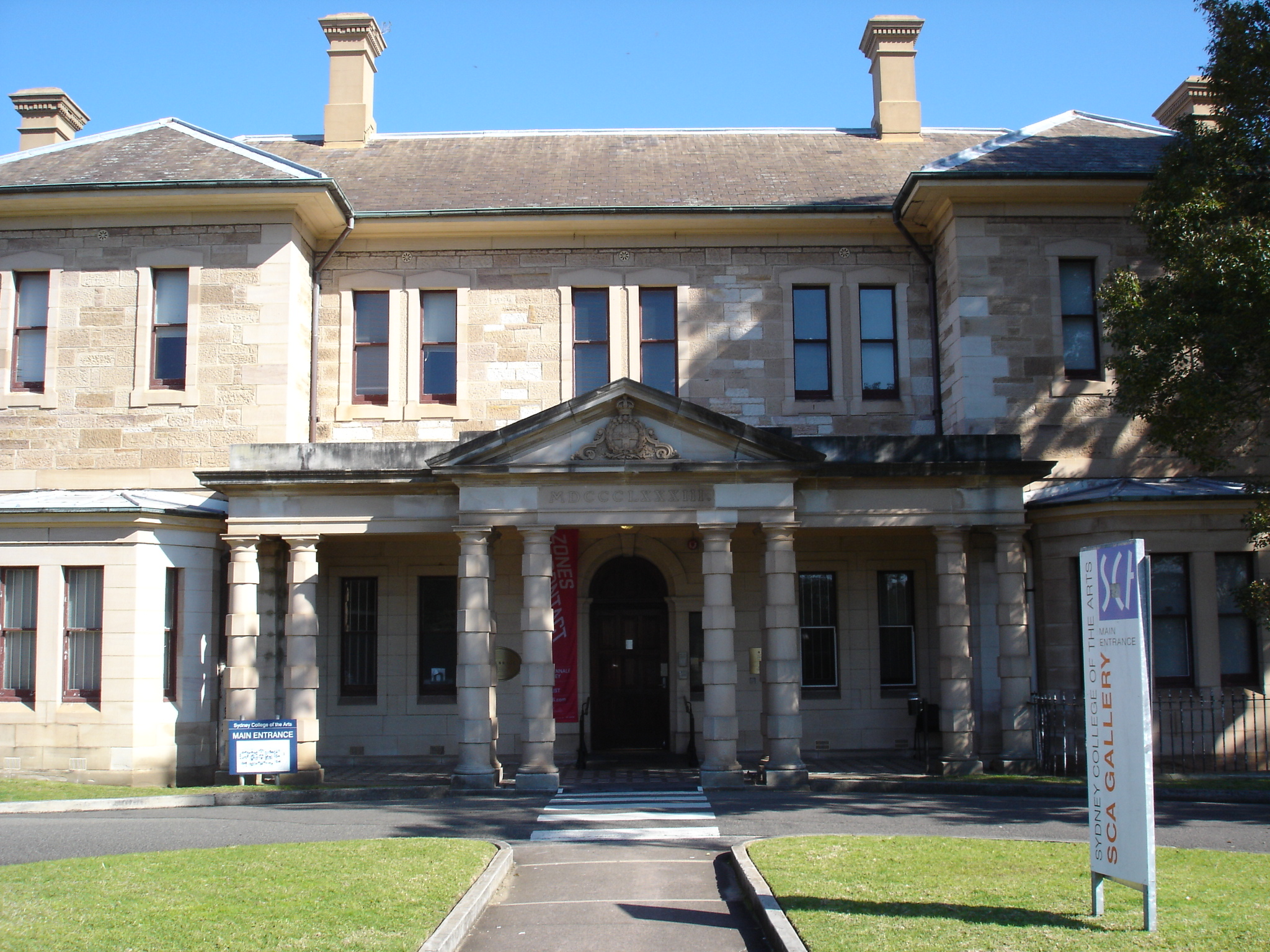
Kirkbride complex
