= John Conomos =

Australian artist (1947–2024)

- Born: 28 January 1947; Grafton, New South Wales, Australia
- Died: 26 July 2024 (aged 77); Sydney, New South Wales, Australia
- Education: University of New South Wales, University of Technology, Sydney
- Occupations: Artist, critic, writer, academic
- Years active: 1967–2024
- Employer: University of Sydney

John George Conomos (28 January 1947 – 26 July 2024) was an Australian artist, critic and writer, and Associate Professor and Principal Fellow at Victorian College of the Arts, Faculty of Fine Arts and Music, the University of Melbourne.

His books, essays and artworks are framed within four traditions of contemporary art: Anglo–American and Australian cultural studies, critical theory and post-structuralism.

Conomos was an active participant in Australian film and small magazine culture from the mid-1960s, when he was affiliated with the Sydney Push.

Conomos worked across a number of art forms – video, new media, installation art, radiophonic art and photo-performance – and his written oeuvre includes cultural and film aesthetics, art criticism and theory, new media and critical theory.

Conomos received a New Media Arts Board Fellowship in 2000 and developed two major projects during this time, Aura and Cyborg Ned. He died in Sydney on 26 July 2024, at the age of 77.

== Writing and publishing projects ==
From the 1970s, Conomos was an art, film and media essayist, both in Australia and overseas, as well as a critic and writer responsible for many articles, book chapters, reviews, critiques and commentary for local and international journals, anthologies and magazines. He was a co-founding editor (with Brian Langer and Eddy Jokovich) of the arts journal Scan+. In 1995, Conomos spoke on interactive art at Sydney's Biennale of Ideas Symposium. He was a new media critic for the Sydney Morning Herald in the 1990s, and in 1999 was appointed the Sydney editor for the London-based journal Contemporary.

His main books include: Mutant Media: Essays on Cinema, Video Art and New Media (2008), a collection of essays; Anti-Kythera Conversations (2010) and Kythera Conversations (2010); and two anthologies co-edited with Brad Buckley; Republics of Ideas: Republicanism Culture Visual Arts (2001);, Rethinking the Contemporary Art School: The Artist, the PhD and the Academy (2009), and Ecologies of Invention (2013). He has been a contributor to periodicals, journals and newspapers around the world since the 1970s, including the now defunct Filmnews, Continuum: The Australian Journal of Media & Culture and RealTime.

Also, with Brad Buckley, Conomos has published a major illustrated monograph, Brad Buckley/John Conomos, published by the Australian Centre for Photography in 2013.

Other contributions include chapter articles in Catherine Simpson, Renata Murawska and Anthony Lambert's Diasporas of Australian Cinema (2009) published by Intellect; James Elkins' What Do Artists Know? (2012) published by Penn State University Press; Sean Cubitt and Paul Thomas' collection Relive: Media Art Histories (2013) published by The MIT Press; and the foreword to Video Void (2014), published by Australian Scholarly Publishing.

== Curatorial work ==
Conomos in the 1980s was a film curator, programmer and researcher for the Australian Film Institute, Paddington. There, Conomos was responsible for the film programs: Cahiers Du Cinema in the Fifties, Early German Expressionist Cinema, The Evil Eye (Religion in the Cinema), Cinematheque Series: Ken Russell, François Truffaut, Horror Film (a retrospective), Through Other People's Eyes (Multicultural Cinema) and Archetypes (with Mark Jackson and Mark Stiles).

Conomos towards the late 1980s was also a video art and new media curator/consultant and researcher for the Australian International Video Festival and Electronic Media Arts (Australia). He was a director of both organisations and, was also media artist-in-residence for Electronic Media Arts (Australia).

Since the 1970s, Conomos has also been a film program consultant and researcher for the Sydney Film Festival, Melbourne International Film Festival and the Adelaide Film Festival and for local and international academic and cultural institutions and organisations, galleries and museums in Australia, England, Greece, France, Canada, Germany and the United States of America.

== Academia ==
Conomos has worked as an academic since 1985, including College of Fine Arts, University of New South Wales; the University of Technology, Sydney; and the Sydney College of the Arts, University of Sydney.

== Videography ==
Conomos' videos and installations have been exhibited throughout Australia, France, England, the United States of America, Canada, China, Greece, Italy, Switzerland, Germany, Belgium, Sweden, Denmark, the Netherlands, Brazil, Argentina, Chile and New Zealand, and reviewed or cited in Artforum International, Art and Australia, Screen, Senses of Cinema, Cantrill Filmnotes, Art Monthly, Photofile, Broadsheet, Eyeline, Metro Magazine, Vertigo (London), Variant (Liverpool, UK), The Times Higher Education Supplement, Heat, Tate Modern Catalogue and Art Survey, RealTime, Continuum and Scanlines.

- Museum of Fire (with Chris Caines and David Haines), 1991.
- White Light (with David Haines), 1991.
- Night Sky, 1995.
- Slow Burn, 1996.
- Autumn Song, 1998.
- Album Leaves, 1999.
- Aura, 2003.
- Cyborg Ned, 2003.
- Autumn Song, Take Two, 1998–2008.
- Lake George (After Mark Rothko), 2008.
- Rat-a-tat-tat, 2008.
- Shipwreck, 2011.
- Dada Buster, 2013.
- The Spiral of Time, 2013.
- Nocturnal Bench, 2013.
- The Absent Sea, 2013.
- Paging Mr Hitchcock, 2014.
- Miro on the Beach, 2014.
- The Girl from the Sea, 2014.

== Radiophonic works ==
- Smoke in the Woods, 1998.
- Cinema of Solitude (with Robert Lloyd), 2001.
- The Bells of Toledo, 2008.

== Other resources ==
- George Alexander, Australian Perspecta, Exhibition catalogue, Art Gallery of New South Wales, 1989.
- Cathie Payne, 'Visible Spaces, Electronic Records: John Conomos and Tracey Moffatt,' in Nicholas Zurbrugg (ed.), 'Electronic Arts in Australia', Continuum, Vol. 8, No.1, 1994, pp. 318–327.
- Michael Maziere, 'Passing through the Image', in Julia Knight (ed), Diverse Practices, University of London and The Arts Council of England, 1996.
- Nicholas Papastergiadis, Dialogues in Diaspora, Rivers Oram Press, London and New York, 1998.
- Helen Macallan, 'Autumn Song: John Conomos' Work of Mourning', Heat, 10, 1998.
- George Kouvaras, 'Nocturnal Kinship: Cinema and memory in John Conomos', Album Leaves, Screening the Past, No.13, 2001, Melbourne.
- Tom Holert, 'Unsentimental Education', Artforum, Summer Issue, 2010.
