= James Macfarlane (moderator) =

Scottish minister and ecclesiastical author

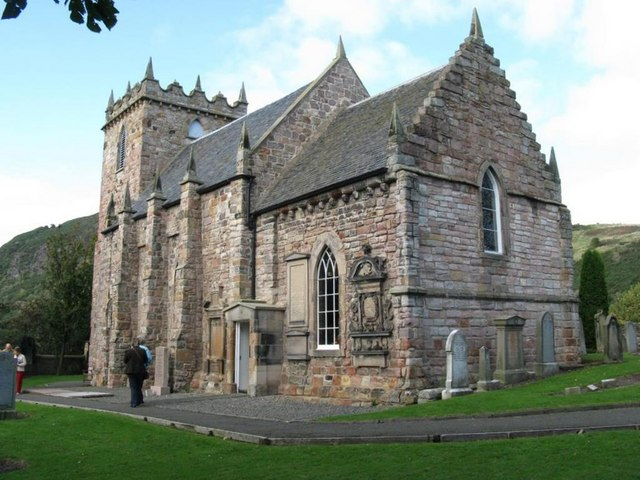
Duddingston Kirk

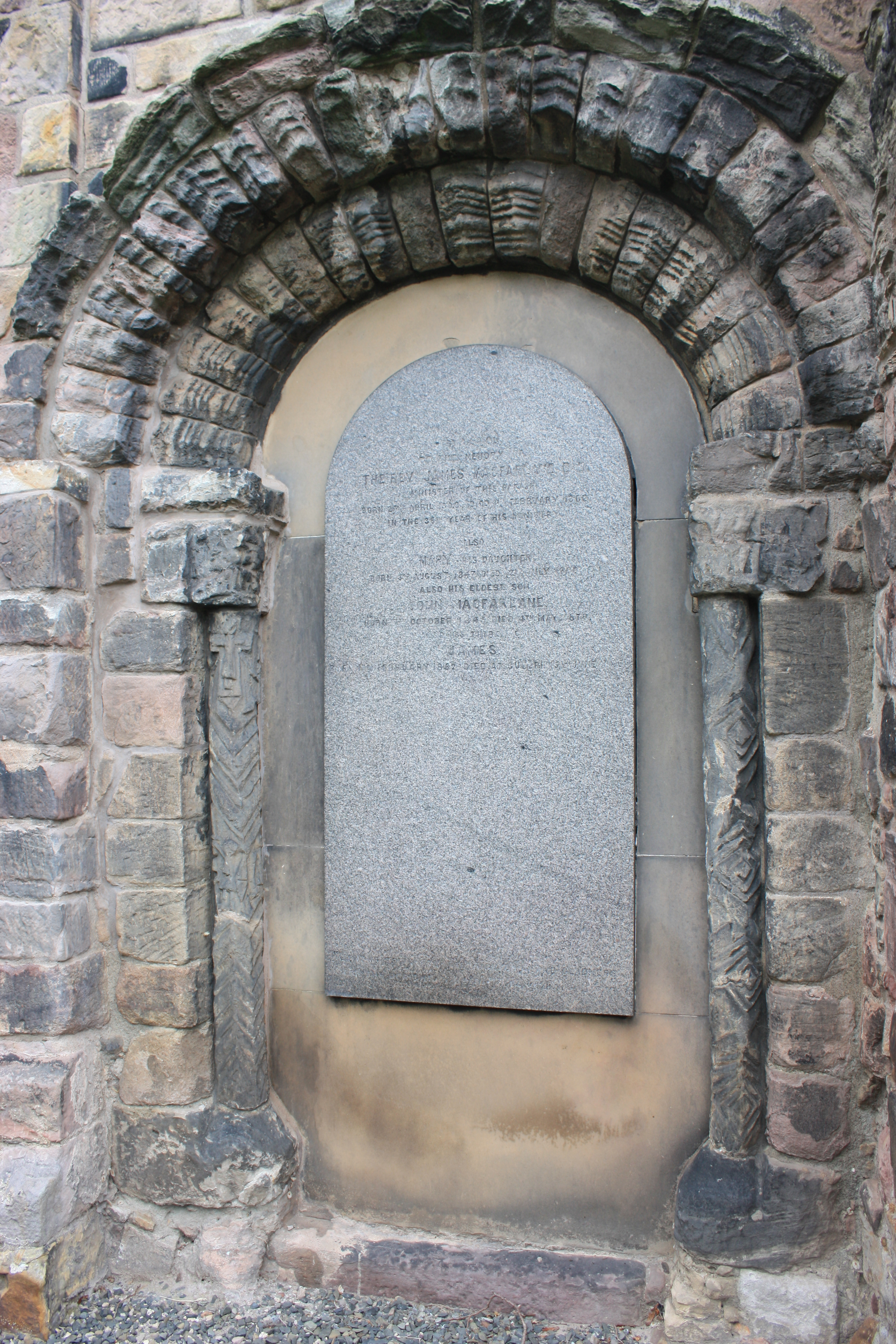
The grave Macfarlane, Duddingston Kirk

James Macfarlane FRSE (1808–1866) was a Scottish minister and ecclesiastical author who served as Moderator of the General Assembly of the Church of Scotland in 1865. He was minister of Duddingston Kirk from 1841 until death.

== Life ==
He was born in Waterbeck in Dumfriesshire on 27 April 1808, the son of Rev John Macfarlane (1770–1829). His father later took over the Relief Church at Bridgeton, Glasgow and James was educated at the High School in Glasgow. He then studied divinity at Glasgow University, graduating MA in 1825. He then began helping his father in the Relief Chapel. He was licensed to preach in 1830 and initially spent two years at the North Church in Stirling.

In 1832 he moved to St Bernard’s Chapel in Stockbridge, Edinburgh. He then lived at 11 Carlton Street.

In 1841 he replaced Rev John Thomson at Duddingston Kirk south of Edinburgh. In 1857 he was elected a fellow of the Royal Society of Edinburgh, his proposer being James Grant. In 1848 Glasgow University gave him an honorary doctorate (DD).

In 1865 he succeeded William Robinson Pirie as Moderator of the General Assembly. He died before a successor was chosen.

He died on 6 February 1866 in Duddingston manse. He is buried with his children, Mary, John and James, in Duddingston Kirkyard. The grave is set into the original Norman entrance on the south side of the church.

== Publications ==
- A Nation’s True Glory (1838)
- A Version of the Prophecies of Ezekiel (1845)
- A Glance at the Temple (1847)
- The Church and the Nation (1849)
- Lectures on Popery (1854)
- The Disciple Whom Jesus Loved (1855)
- The Indian Mission of the Church of Scotland (1856)
- The Reign of Harmony (1859)
- The Railway (1863)

== Family ==
In July 1841 he was married to Agnes Jane Goodsir of Prestonpans (d.1895). They had nine children, all born in Duddingston manse. Following James’ death she remarried to John Gunn, Secretary of the British Linen Bank.

His eldest daughter Agnes Goodsir Macfarlane (b. 1842) married Rev John Adam Macfarlane of Urray. Helen (b.1843) married Rev Robert K. D. Home of Corstorphine. Other children included Eliza (b.1844), John (1845-1878), Mary died in infancy, Alexander Goodsir Macfarlane (1849-1897), James (1852-1880), William (b. 1855), Malcolm David Macfarlane (1860-1895) a lawyer.
