= John Thomson of Duddingston =

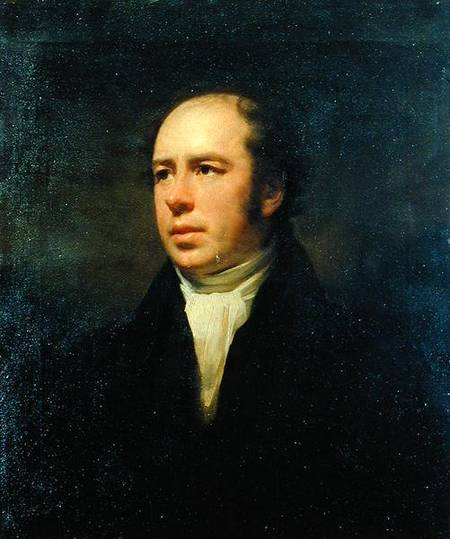
John Thomson by Henry Raeburn

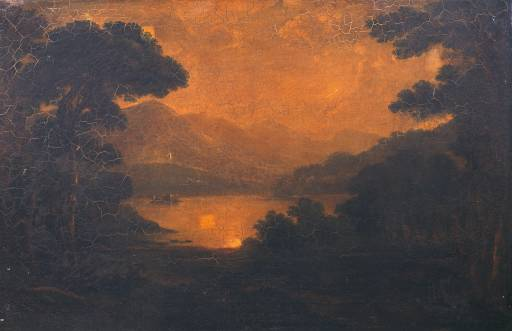
Loch-an-Eilean, Rothiemurchus, Inverness-shire, 1835, Tate Gallery

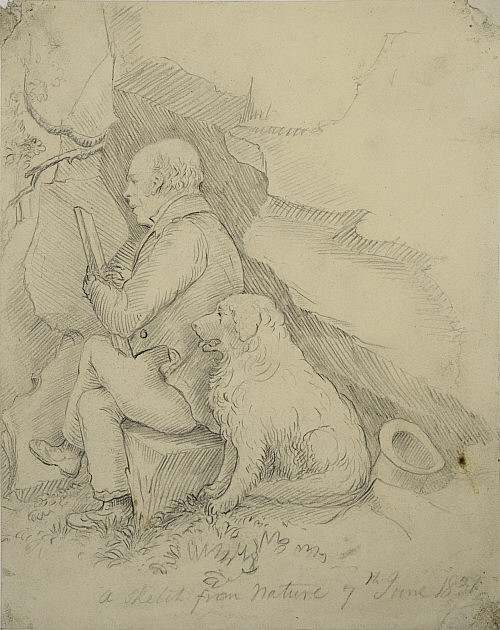
Thomson sketched while working outdoors by his friend, Thomas Dick Lauder, 1831, National Gallery of Scotland

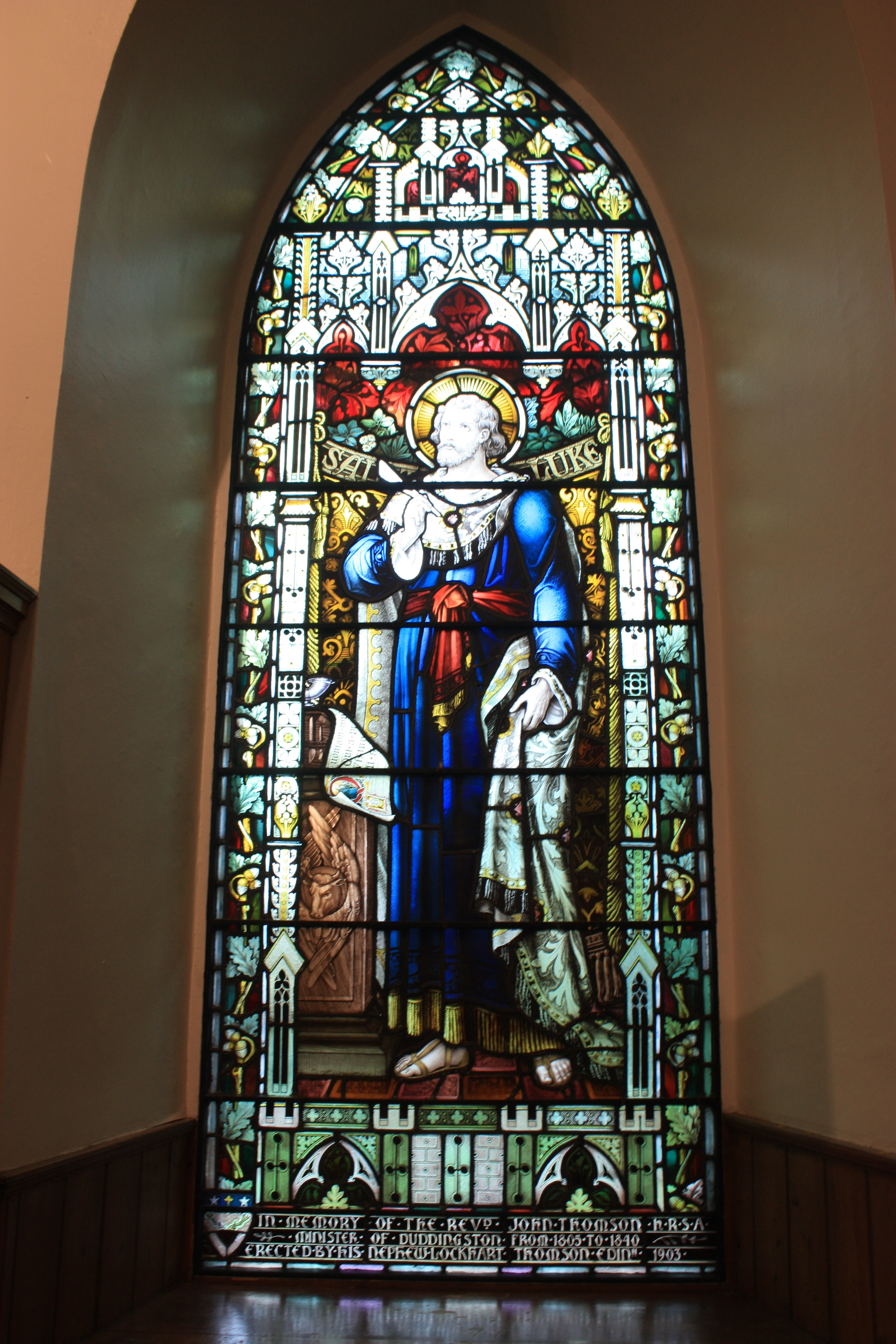
Memorial window to Rev John Thomson, Duddingston Kirk

Rev John Thomson FRSE HonRSA (1 September 1778 – 28 October 1840) was a Scottish minister of the Church of Scotland and noted amateur landscape painter. He was the minister of Duddingston Kirk from 1805 to 1840.

== Life ==
The youngest of eight children, Thomson was born in the manse at Dailly, Ayrshire, the fourth son of Mary Hay and her husband, Rev Thomas Thomson, the local parish minister of the Church of Scotland. He was educated at Dailly Parish School.

From an early age, he displayed an aptitude for drawing and painting and, inspired by the Ayrshire countryside, developed a love for landscape painting.

In 1791 he enrolled at the University of Glasgow to study law and theology, and in 1793 he transferred to the University of Edinburgh to study divinity. While there, he met many people who were prominent in Edinburgh artistic circles, including Walter Scott, and Alexander Nasmyth, the latter of whom who gave him art lessons.

After graduating, Thomson returned to Ayrshire and was licensed as minister of the Church of Scotland, and subsequently ordained as minister of Dailly in 1800 in place of his father. In 1805 he was translated to Duddingston near Edinburgh and became the most famous minister of the local Kirk, remaining in the role until death in 1840.

In 1814 he was elected a Fellow of the Royal Society of Edinburgh. His proposers were John Playfair, Archibald Alison, and Sir David Brewster.

While at Duddingston a very fine portrait of him was painted by Robert Scott Lauder who married Thomson's daughter Isabella in 1833.

Thomson died of apoplexy at Duddingston manse in 1840, having spent 41 years in the ministry. He was succeeded by Rev James Macfarlane.

His grave in Duddingston churchyard is marked by a distinctive stone sarcophagus.

== Artistic aspects ==
Thomson had a studio at the foot of the manse garden on the shore of Duddingston Loch. Later, this was replaced by Duddingston Tower, a structure designed for Duddingston Curling Society in 1825 by William Playfair. The Society used the ground floor as their clubhouse, and Thomson used the upper floor of the tower, known today as "Thomson's Tower", as his studio.

The move to Duddingston allowed him to renew his acquaintances with men of influence in artistic circles and develop his art. Like his early teacher, Naysmith, Thomson believed in working outdoors, observing directly from nature. Influenced by the techniques of Rosa, Lorrain, Poussin, Raeburn and renowned English landscape artist J.M.W. Turner, he developed a broad Romantic style, and became a landscape artist with an established reputation. This allowed him to augment his small stipend and become quite wealthy through the sale of his paintings.

In addition to Scott, Naysmith and Raeburn, Thomson was friendly with writer and fellow amateur artist, Thomas Dick Lauder, and such was Thomsons reputation that in 1818 he entertained Turner at his studio, who is said to have remarked of the outlook over the Loch: "By God sir, I envy you that piece of water." Duncan Macmillan sees the influence of Turner and John Constable in Thomson's Fast Castle from Below, painted around 1824. Thomson went on to collaborate with Turner in producing engravings to illustrate Walter Scott's Provincial Antiquities and Picturesque Scenery of Scotland, published in 1826.

Recognising his talent, Thomson's congregation nominated him to become a member of the Association of Artists in Edinburgh. He went on to receive honorary memberships of the Royal Institution for the Encouragement of the Fine Arts in Scotland and the Royal Scottish Academy.

== Family ==
In 1801 he married Isabella Ramsay (1782-1809) daughter of Rev John Ramsay of Kirkmichael. Together they had a daughter Margaret (1806-1827). Their son Thomas Thomson MD (1802-1873) became mayor of Stratford-upon-Avon. John Thomson (1803-1870) was a Captain in the HEICS. Their daughter Isabella Thomson (1809-1869) married the artist Robert Scott Lauder.

In 1813, following Isabella's death he married Frances Ingram Spence (1779-1845). She was the widow of Martin Dalrymple of Fordel. They had further sons: Francis Thomson MD (1814-1858); Henry Francis (b. 1819); Edward (b.1821); and two daughters, Emily (b.1816) and Mary Helen (b.1817).

His older brother was the antiquarian Thomas Thomson FRSE.

== Memorials ==
Thomson's nephew Lochhart Thomson had installed a memorial stained glass window in 1903 in Duddingston Kirk. It stands immediately to the west of the pulpit.

== Anecdotes ==
- In addition to being known for his landscape paintings, Thomson is often credited with giving rise to the famous Lowland Scots adage "We're a' Jock Tamson's bairns", which as early as 1847 was described as "an expression of mutual good fellowship very frequently heard in Scotland." However, there is some evidence that it may predate John Thomson, and there is also a Scottish Gaelic version.
- One version attributing the origin of the adage to Thomson is that his first wife died after they had five children, he then married a widow who already had five children, and this second marriage produced another four children. When his wife then made introductions to visitors and tried to explain which family the various children belonged to, Thomson would interrupt her with the statement that "They're a' Jock Thomson's bairns". It may also be accounted for by his general reputation for forgiveness and inclusiveness, for example his reputed disapproval of the excessive use of withdrawing communion tokens to exclude parishioners from taking communion. This might explain an already extant old saying being adopted to refer to him.
- To ensure privacy to paint in his studio, Thomson named the Tower "Edinburgh", in order that casual visitors to the Manse could be informed by his staff that he was unavailable, as he had gone to "Edinburgh".
- Duddingston Loch has a long historical connection with curling and skating and is the setting for the iconic painting, The Skating Minister, by Thomson's artistic acquaintance, Henry Raeburn. The subject of the painting is not Thomson however, but Robert Walker, minister of the Canongate Kirk.
