= Debra Dawes =

Australian artist (born 1955)

Debra Dawes (born 1955) is an Australian contemporary painter best known for her abstract paintings of gridlike structures and geometric patterns. She has been a practicing artist since the early 1980s and is seen as one of the leading figures in Australian abstract art. She has held over 25 solo exhibitions, been part of more than 60 group exhibitions and her works are held in national, state and private collections around Australia.

== Biography ==
Debra Dawes was born in Goondiwindi, Queensland, Australia on 9 May 1955. She currently travels between Coledale, Murrurundi and Sydney, NSW to live and work. Dawes met her now husband, Jelle van den Berg, in 1982. She traveled with him to The Netherlands and stayed there for 6 months before returning to Australia to continue her studies. During this time, they opened an art gallery, Union Street Gallery that continued into the 1990s.

== Education ==
In 1979, Dawes completed an Art Certificate at TAFE in Newcastle, Australia. She then went on to attain an Art Diploma at the College of Advanced Education in Newcastle 1980–82. In 1985, she obtained a Post-Graduate Diploma in Painting at Sydney College of the Arts. Almost a decade later in 1994, Dawes began her doctorate of creative arts at the University of Wollongong, completing the degree in 2000. After studying in Sydney, Dawes moved to Murrurundi, NSW in order to support her family and to enable adequate working space for both her and her husband's artistic practices. .

== Career ==
Dawes’ practice is based in reductive abstract painting, using alternating colours, patterns, and geometric forms. She frequently employs formal structures such as grids, planes, volume, space, and line. Her work engages with a broad range of ideas, including mediating personal experience, examining the relationship between knowledge and perception, exploring feminist theory and power relations, and critiquing political language and institutional structures.[2] Critical interpretations of her practice have referenced space as social commentary,[5] perceptual activation, and investigations into the nature and form of the painted image, including the tension between seduction and resistance of the viewer’s gaze. Dawes worked at the Sydney College of the Arts, University of Sydney, initially as a lecturer before later becoming Director of the Graduate Program.

== Exhibitions ==
Dawes has held over 25 solo exhibitions from 1983 with her most recent being in 2017. She has exhibited across Australia in Melbourne, Sydney, Canberra and Perth and in Groningen, The Netherlands. She has also exhibited in more than 60 group exhibitions from as early as 1984, both nationally throughout Australia and internationally in Italy, Hong Kong.

== Recognition and awards ==
Dawes has received numerous Australian grants and awards. She has been a recipient of the Australia Council grant four times, in 1990, 1994, 1997 and 2004, and in 2010 she was awarded the Redlands Westpac Art Prize.

== Collections ==
Dawes' artworks are held in many collections Australia wide. Her work is collected by the National Gallery of Australia, National Gallery of Victoria, Art Gallery of New South Wales, Art Gallery of Western Australia and the Queensland Art Gallery. Universities that collect her works are Murdoch University, the University of Queensland and the University of Wollongong. Her work is also collected by numerous regional and private collections such as Macquarie Bank, Artbank, Allen, Allen & Hemsley, Powerhouse Museum, Wesfarmers Arts, Cruthers Collection of Women's Art and the New England Regional Art Museum.

== Notable works ==
Starlite, 1993, Oil on Board, 240 x 390 cm

Unfinished Business, 1998, Acrylic on polyester, 202.5 x 367 cm
