= Joseph Monteith (Deputy Lieutenant) =

Deputy Lieutenant of Lanark (1852–1911)

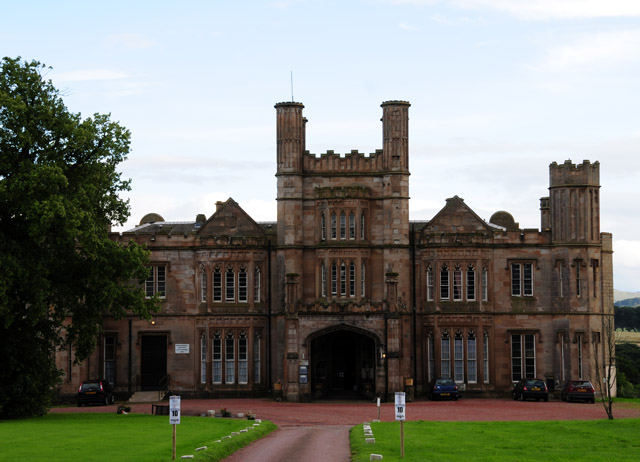
Carstairs House, now called Monteith House

Joseph Monteith CBE DL JP (29 March 1852 – 10 October 1911) of Carstairs, County Lanark, Knight of Malta, was Deputy Lieutenant for the County of Lanark, Scotland.

== Family ==
He was the son of Robert Monteith, DL, JP, of Carstairs, by Wilhelmina Anne, daughter of Joseph Mellish of Blythe, Nottinghamshire.

On 13 October 1874 he married Florence Catharine Mary Herbert (17 April 1850 – 23 January 1900), daughter of John Arthur Edward Herbert and the Hon. Augusta Charlotte Elizabeth Hall of Llanarth Court at Llanarth, Monmouthshire. The children from this marriage were:

- Gertrude Mary Monteith, nun of the Sacred Heart order.
- Major Henry John Monteith, b. Aug 1876; Major in the Lanarkshire Yeomanry; k.a. Gallipoli, 27 Dec 1915.
- Revd. Robert Joseph Monteith, SJ, CF; b. 6 Nov 1877; died 27 Nov 1917 at Ribécourt-la-Tour during the battle Cambrai while serving as a military chaplain.
- Major Joseph Basil Monteith, OBE, DL, JP, b. 1878 Major in the Gordon Highlanders; married Dorothea, daughter of Sir Charles Nicholson, 1st Baronet of Harrington Gardens and had issue.
- Francis Bernard Monteith, settled in Vancouver and worked as a surveyor.
- Mary Christina Monteith, married Lt. Col. Lawrie Charles Oppenheim.
- Augusta Catherine Monteith, nun of the Sacred Heart order.
- Major Montague Edmund Monteith, of the Maratha Light Infantry, married Isabella Marion FitzGibbon.
- Major John Herbert Monteith, Major in the South Wales Borderers, married Caroline Annie Maguire.
- Captain George Michael Monteith, Captain in the Gordon Highlanders, killed at the battle of Loos in the First World War
- Catherine Maria Monteith, nun of the Sacred Heart order.
- Christian Mary Monteith, nun of the Sacred Heart order.
- Monica Margaret Monteith, married Robert Ogilvie Abercromby.

== Career ==
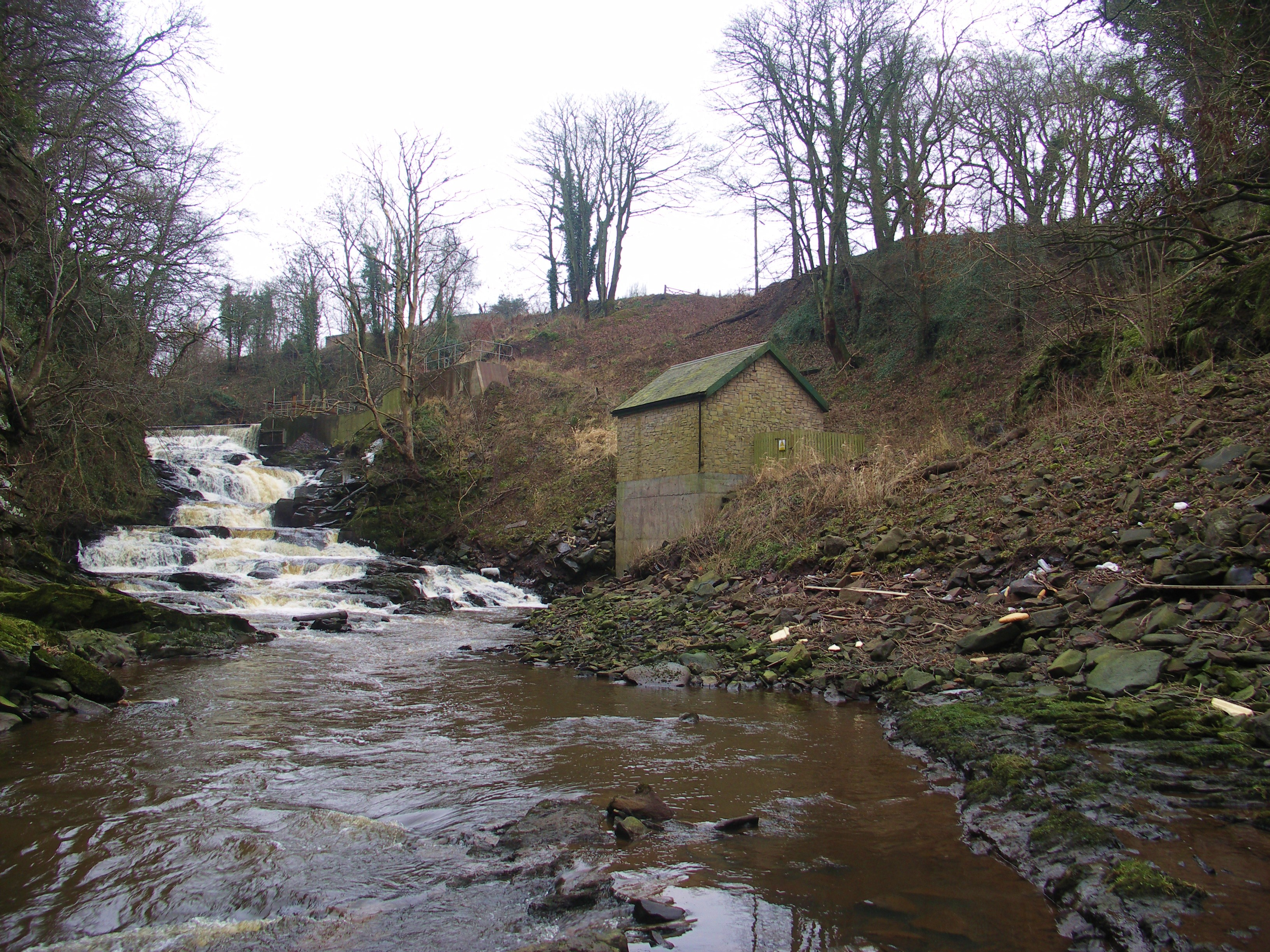
Power station at Jarviswood

He resided at Carstairs House (now called Monteith House). The estate comprised 5581 acres. He undertook much improvement work, including the provision of electric power for the house from a hydro electric plant at Jarviswood. He also used this electric power to power the Carstairs House Tramway.

He was a Justice of the Peace for the County of Lanark. He was appointed Deputy Lieutenant for the County of Lanark.

He submitted a patent to the patent office on 20 July 1875 for “improvements in the construction of velocipedes”.
