= Monteith Hall =

Monteith Hall can refer to:

- Monteith Hall (Elyria, Ohio), on the National Register of Historic Places
- Monteith Hall, Virginia Tech campus
