= Scott Monteith (artist) =

- Born: Missouri, United States
- Education: Southeast Missouri State University
- Known for: printmaking, painting, sculpture
- Movement: Contemporary Art
- Patrons: Robert Plant, Demi Moore, Huel Howser

Scott Monteith is an American artist best known for his vibrant paintings of jack rabbits, lizards, quail, and landscapes of the desert Southwest. He is a curator for art in public spaces, government venues, galleries and non-profit organizations in Joshua Tree and 29 Palms, California as well as Missouri (his home state). Monteith is a leading figure in the preservation of homesteads in Wonder Valley, California and the Mojave Desert. Images of his water color's depicting the homesteads that dot the area were featured in the now defunct Palm Springs magazine Dune, as well as the L.A. Times and the SunRunner Magazine. His studio, "the Fi-Lox-See," garnered fame for the Wonder Valley area with the KCET documentary "The Road to Wonder Valley," which features fellow artists in the Joshua Tree communities. At his studio he gathered together distinguished intellectuals, drag queens, playwrights, Bohemian street people, Hollywood celebrities, and wealthy patrons. Monteith was instrumental in the promotion of the area as an arts destination as president of the Morongo Basin Cultural Arts Council, with the advent of the "Hwy 62 Art Tours," the largest geographical self-guided art tour in the United States. Monteith was involved in many events designed to celebrate and attract visitors to the Joshua Tree National Park, adjacent to his studio.

Monteith also assembles and completes works for other artists, particularly for Burning Man and Art Basil Miami and has been included in multiple stories by the New York Times.
