= Carstairs House =

Country house in Scotland

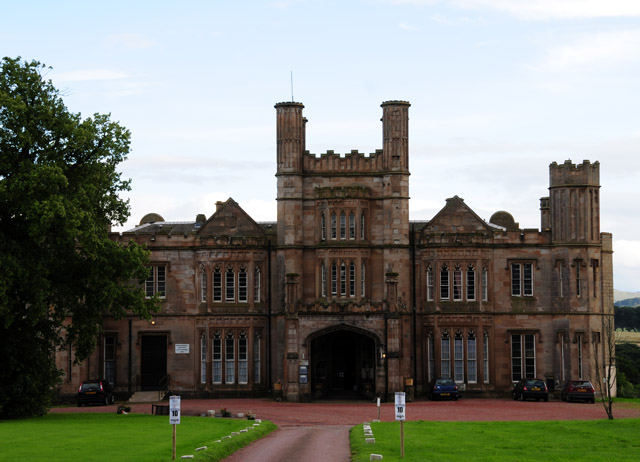
- Carstairs House, now Monteith House Nursing Home

- Location in South Lanarkshire
- 55.680904°N 3.684535°W
- Type: Country house

History
- Built: 1821 - 1823

Site notes
- Architect: William Burn
- Architectural style: "Tudor" gothic
- Current use: Nursing home

Listed Building – Category A
- Designated: 12 January 1971
- Reference no.: LB712

Carstairs House, also known as Monteith House, is a country house 1.5 kilometres (0.93 mi) south-west of Carstairs, South Lanarkshire, Scotland. The house is protected as a category A listed building.

== History ==
Carstairs House was designed by the Edinburgh architect William Burn and built for Henry Monteith MP between 1821 and 1823. It then passed to his son Robert Monteith, and on his death to Joseph Monteith, who built a hydroelectric plant at nearby Jarviswood, and the Carstairs House Tramway to transport guests and family to and from Carstairs railway station. It was purchased by Sir James King, the former Lord Provost of Glasgow in 1899.

In 1924 Carstairs House was acquired the Roman Catholic Archdiocese of Glasgow who had selected it as base for the St Charles' Certified Institution for "mentally defective Catholic children". The children arrived there in 1925. The institution, which was staffed by Daughters of Charity of Saint Vincent de Paul, closed in 1983.

The house re-opened as a nursing home known as Monteith House (named after its original owner) in 1986 and, after a temporary closure between 2009 and 2011, re-opened again.

== See also ==
- List of Category A listed buildings in South Lanarkshire
- List of listed buildings in Carstairs, South Lanarkshire
