= Monteith, Glebe =

Monteith
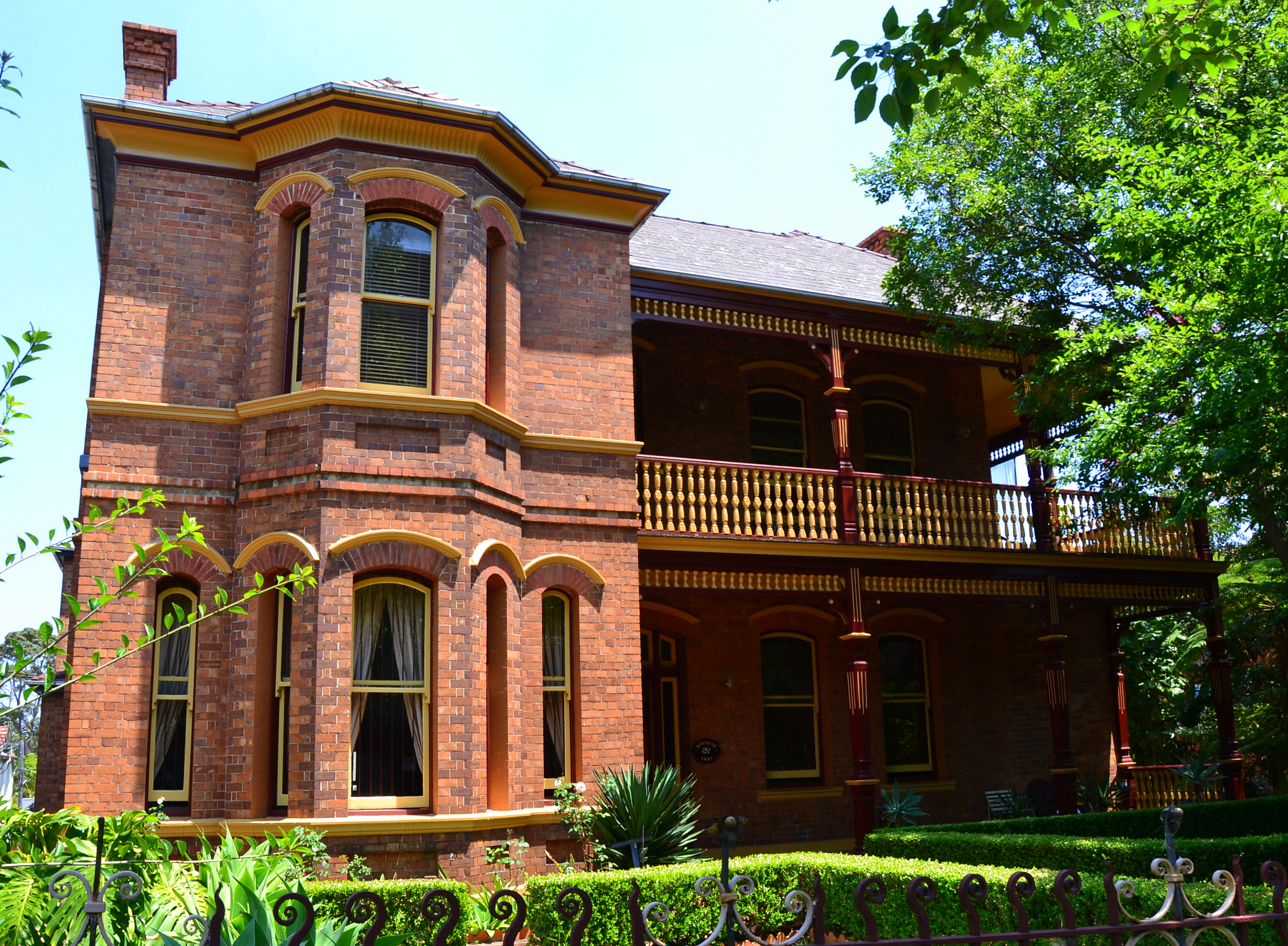

- Location within Sydney Location within Australia
- 33.8739°S 151.1820°E
- Location: 266 Glebe Point Road, Glebe, City of Sydney, New South Wales, Australia

History
- Built: 1890–

Site notes
- Architectural style: Federation Queen Anne

New South Wales Heritage Register
- Official name: Monteith
- Type: State heritage (built)
- Designated: 2 April 1999
- Reference no.: 592
- Type: House
- Category: Residential buildings (private)

Monteith is a heritage-listed residence at located 266 Glebe Point Road in the inner western Sydney suburb of Glebe in the City of Sydney local government area of New South Wales, Australia. It was built in 1890. It was added to the New South Wales State Heritage Register on 2 April 1999.

== History ==
=== History of Glebe ===
The Leichhardt area was originally inhabited by the Wangal clan of Aborigines. After 1788 diseases such as smallpox and the loss of their hunting grounds caused huge reductions in their numbers and they moved further inland. Since European settlement the foreshores of Blackwattle Bay and Rozelle Bay have developed a unique maritime, industrial and residential character - a character which continues to evolve as areas which were originally residential estates, then industrial areas, are redeveloped for residential units and parklands.

The first formal grant in the Glebe area was a 162-hectare (400-acre) grant to Rev. Richard Johnson, the colony's first chaplain, in 1789. The Glebe (land allocated for the maintenance of a church minister) comprised rolling shale hills covering sandstone, with several sandstone cliff faces. The ridges were drained by several creeks including Blackwattle Creek, Orphan School Creek and Johnston Creek. Extensive swampland surrounded the creeks. On the shale ridges, heavily timbered woodlands contained several varieties of eucalypts while the swamplands and tidal mudflats had mangroves, swamp oaks (Casuarina glauca) and blackwattles (Callicoma serratifolia) after which the bay is named.

Blackwattle Swamp was first mentioned by surveyors in the 1790s and Blackwattle Swamp Bay in 1807. By 1840 it was called Blackwattle Bay. Boat parties collected wattles and reeds for the building of huts, and kangaroos and emus were hunted by the early settlers who called the area the Kangaroo Ground. Rozelle Bay is thought to have been named after a schooner which once moored in its waters.

Johnson's land remained largely undeveloped until 1828, when the Church and School Corporation subdivided it into 28 lots, three of which they retained for church use. The Church sold 27 allotments in 1828 - north on the point and south around Broadway. The Church kept the middle section where the Glebe Estate is now. On the point the sea breezes attracted the wealthy who built villas. The Broadway end attracted slaughterhouses and boiling down works that used the creek draining to Blackwattle Swamp. Up until the 1970s the Glebe Estate was in the possession of the Church.

On the point the sea breezes attracted the wealthy who built villas. The Broadway end attracted slaughterhouses and boiling down works that used the creek draining to Blackwattle Swamp. Smaller working-class houses were built around these industries. Abbattoirs were built there from the 1860s. When Glebe was made a municipality in 1859 there were pro and anti-municipal clashes in the streets. From 1850 Glebe was dominated by wealthier interests.

Reclaiming the swamp, Wentworth Park opened in 1882 as a cricket ground and lawn bowls club. Rugby union football was played there in the late 19th century. The dog racing started in 1932. In the early 20th century modest villas were broken up into boarding houses as they were elsewhere in the inner city areas. The wealthier moved into the suburbs which were opening up through the railways.

Up until the 1950s Sydney was the location for working class employment - it was a port and industrial city. By the 1960s central Sydney was becoming a corporate city with service-based industries - capital intensive not labour intensive. A shift in demographics occurred, with younger professionals and technical and administrative people servicing the corporate city wanting to live close by. Housing was coming under threat and the heritage conservation movement was starting. The Fish Markets came to Glebe in the 1970s. An influx of students came to Glebe in the 1960s and 1970s.

=== Monteith ===
Monteith was constructed after 1890 as the home of John Henry (known as 'John') Cotter, his wife Margaret and family (they had six sons) who moved in after 1894 and continued to occupy the house until the 1930s when the land was subdivided. John Cotter died in 1922. Margaret remained, with her sister and two sons (including the eldest, William who had returned to live there after his own wife had died). Margaret was an artistic woman and chose quite soft colours for her home, not what are commonly thought of as the rather bald "Federation" colours often used today.

Four of their sons had died, two in World War I in Palestine (metallurgist, John, and "Tibby") and two (Lands Department cartographer, William and Tax Officer worker and athlete, Norman) through accidents. The house was a happy family home with many celebration dinners held in its time, mostly connected with "Tibby", the youngest son, and his cricket tours. Tibby was a stretcher bearer for the Australian Light Horse and was killed in the Charge at Beersheba, Palestine in 1917. Tibby's grave is well known to cricket enthusiasts. A biography of him, Tibby Cotter: fast bowler, larrikin, Anzac, by Max Bonnell and Andrew Sproul, was published in 2012.

After Margaret died in 1936 (or 1938), the remaining two sons (William and Norman) lived there until the early 1950s. William died in 1950. His daughter was executrix and sold the house in c. 1952 to a confectioner. The firm Stuart Thom was involved but the house remained a private house for a time.

The house was used for many years as a nursing training college and up until the 1980's as part of the College of the Arts under the direction of the NSW Department of Technical Education. The property was further subdivided in the late 1990s and the house bought by Glen Scott for conversion back to a single residence. In the 1970s there was more garden planting in front of the house and its colour scheme was closer to the original scheme.

==== Conservation and protection ====
The house now stands on a reduced curtilage, the State Heritage Register curtilage boundary following the present lot boundary. Structures not covered by the initial Permanent Conservation Order, such as the former Stables, were demolished as part of the redevelopment of the Allen Street and former Sydney College of Arts grounds. During its use as offices attached to a teaching facility only superficial maintenance was carried out by the NSW Department of Public Works & Services (DPWS). At the time of the sale to Mr Scott, areas of significant fabric were in poor condition with water egress. DPWS carried out repair work to the interior of the house prior to completion of the sale.

Previous approvals have allowed considerable subdivision of the property (since the Cotter family subdivided the Monteith estate in the 1930s, later owners subdividing it again in 1958) and redevelopment since 1971 (Nursing) and 1975 (Arts) for College uses with erection of three buildings to the rear. These rear buildings are student study rooms, an administration and lecture room building, a child care centre (converted former cottage) and outdoor play area, are respectively further west. All three have since been demolished. A heritage study in 1995 recommended retention of the remaining garden / rear yard curtilage, with no greater site coverage in buildings than then existing. It also recommended retention of the College lecture/administration building to the west, noting it provided useful living space on site, possibly in excess of what the then planning controls' would allow. After relocation in 1995 of the NSW College of the Arts from Monteith to the Kirkbride complex at Rozelle Hospital (Callan Park in Lilyfield), a rezoning application by the NSW Government in 1996 sought to rezone the site to allow residential redevelopment to the rear.

Within the recommended minimum curtilage (from the 1995 Heritage Study) in the remaining rear yard/underground carpark area (at least) the former stables block, wood shed, a former barbeque area, a number of stone retaining walls and a minimum four trees have been demolished and removed from the rear. As already noted, the three College era buildings were also demolished.

In August 1998, shortly after his purchase of the property, Mr Scott submitted a section 60 application to modify the existing multiple toilets on the first floor, create a large living area on the ground floor and kitchen fit out, repair the front verandah and repair exterior joinery. At that time the application was returned with the advice that he should first make an application for integrated development approval to Council. There is no record on file of such an IDA being submitted nor a following section 60 application. Approval and construction of an underground triple garage and garden pavilion (the latter has yet to be constructed due to protracted legal dispute) in the remnant 15m of rear yard will continue already substantial change the rear of the property. However these changes will be minor. In 2002 approval was given to construct a new swimming pool and fence over the existing rear triple garage in a part of the site already highly altered (in levels, design and with at least one tree removed). No remaining garden elements were affected by this work. Only one remnant garden element, a curved path rear of the house was possibly affected, and the conservation of this element was dealt with by a condition of approval.

A garden pavilion was approved on top of an existing triple underground garage (to block off a leaking proposed stepped access way to the garage). Construction of the pool allows some "residential" uses to occur in the rear yard, and proposed earth filling over the roof of the garage allowed the re-covering of exposed roots of a remaining fig tree in the yard. This will benefit the tree, which otherwise might be expected to decline in health. Both actions will help mask the garage from view from the house/garden, which of itself is considered beneficial to some understanding of the former garden/yard's character, albeit truncated by development further west.

== Description ==
Monteith is a large two-storey brick residence situated on a rectangular land parcel on the western side of Glebe Point Road.

Garden

The established garden (chiefly to the house's east and north) includes a number of mature trees. The property has been much subdivided since the 1930s and sits on a reduced curtilage from the original lot. A small front garden faces Glebe Point Road, with mature trees and shrubs on the northern side of the house particularly.

The house is sited close to Cotter Lane on the southern side of the lot, effectively "urbanising" this boundary space.

A larger rear yard area remains but has been much modified over the years with additions, removals of stables block and other structures. The reduced curtilage and subsequent redevelopment of the former stables and rear yard areas as part of the adjacent development site has significantly impacted on the garden setting of the house at the rear and removed some significant garden elements. This has resulted in the property having a more urban setting at the rear. The rear yard does retain a curving brick path, a mature fig tree north east of the swimming pool and a nearby palm tree. A concrete deck roof to an underground garage is situated at the rear west corner of the site. The deck is set 1 metre below the natural ground level.

House

The house is built in the Federation Queen Anne style and situated 900 millimetres (35 in) from the Cotter Lane boundary. The house presents to Glebe Point Road with a rear wing extending along the Cotter Lane boundary.

=== Condition ===
As at 20 March 2012, (re 2002 rear swimming pool and pavilion approval) no archaeological impacts are foreseen, given the high level of site disturbance by previous redevelopment since 1971, particularly excavation.

=== Modifications and dates ===
- c. 1890 house built
- 1930s land subdivided. The house was used for many years as a nursing training college
- 1958 further subdivision
- 1971+ redevelopment (Nursing uses) and
- 1975 (Arts) College uses with erection of three buildings to the rear. These rear buildings were student study rooms, an administration and lecture room building, a child care centre (converted former cottage) and outdoor play area, are respectively further west. All three have since been demolished
- 1970s: the existing rear balcony which was constructed
- More recently used as part of the College of the Arts under the direction of the NSW Department of Technical Education.
- Late 1990s further subdivided and the house bought by Glen Scott for conversion to a single residence.

The former Stables and other structures not covered by the PCO were demolished as part of the redevelopment of the Allen Street and former Sydney College of Arts grounds.

- c. 1996 change of ownership and conversion
- c. 2000: rear triple garage built
- 2001-2: rear swimming pool built over roof of underground garage. The pool plant was located under the altered rear wing verandah. No details of the proposed pavilion were submitted for Robin Graham to make a proper assessment of the impacts of this structure, but he stated that any structure of a solid nature which impacts on ground levels in this area would not be supported as it has the potential to visually crowd the rear garden setting of the house and could result in the removal and obliteration of existing garden features. The rear boundary walls will need to be raised in height to at least one metre (three feet) to meet with the building code but this will have any impact on the setting of the house.

== Heritage listing ==
As at 27 August 2008, the house Monteith and surviving grounds are significant both of historically and socially for associations with the Cotter family especially Australian cricketer "Tibby" Cotter, later from 1971 as part of the site of the NSW College of Nursing and the Sydney College of the Arts until 1995. It also has historic significance as a remaining one of a number of fine mansion houses along this part of Glebe Point Road. It has aesthetic significance as a fine example of its style and for the contribution it and its grounds make to the streetscape of Glebe Point Road.

Monteith was listed on the New South Wales State Heritage Register on 2 April 1999.

== See also ==
- Australian residential architectural styles
