= Jimmie W. Monteith =

United States Army Medal of Honor recipient

Jimmie Watters Monteith Jr.
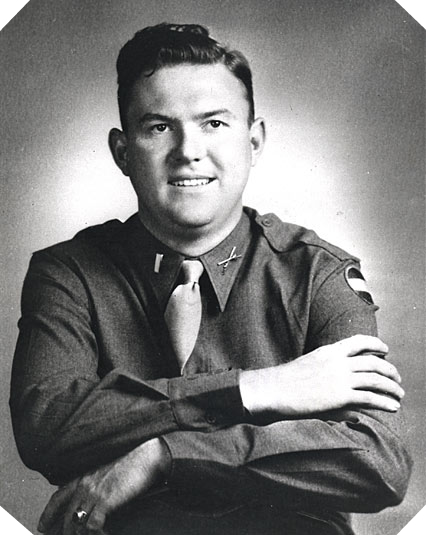
- Jimmie W. Monteith Jr., c. 1944
- Born: July 1, 1917; Low Moor, Virginia, U.S.
- Died: June 6, 1944 (aged 26) near Colleville-sur-mer, Normandy, France
- Burial place: Normandy American Cemetery; Colleville-sur-Mer, France; Plot: Section I, Row 20, Grave 12
- Military career
- Allegiance: United States of America
- Branch: United States Army
- Service years: 1941–1944
- Rank: First Lieutenant
- Nickname: Punk
- Units: Company L, 16th Infantry Regiment, 1st Infantry Division
- Conflicts: World War II; Italian Campaign; Operation Husky; Northern France; Operation Overlord †
- Awards: Medal of Honor; Purple Heart

Jimmie Watters Monteith Jr. (July 1, 1917 – June 6, 1944) was a United States Army officer who received the Medal of Honor posthumously for his heroic actions in World War II at the D-Day landings in Normandy, France.

== Early years ==
Jimmie Watters Monteith Jr. was born on July 1, 1917, in Low Moor, Virginia. His family moved to Richmond, Virginia, when he was nine years old. After elementary school, he attended Thomas Jefferson High School, where he played a year each of varsity football and varsity basketball. Known in high school as "Punk," he graduated in 1937. He attended Virginia Tech (then known as Virginia Agricultural and Mechanical College and Polytechnic Institute, shortened in popular usage to Virginia Polytechnic Institute and now Virginia Tech) for two years, 1937–1939, majoring in mechanical engineering. While at Virginia Tech, he was a member of K Battery in the Virginia Tech Corps of Cadets and the Richmond Sectional Club. He returned to Richmond at the end of his sophomore year and worked as a field representative for the Cabell Coal Company, where his father was vice president.

== Military service ==
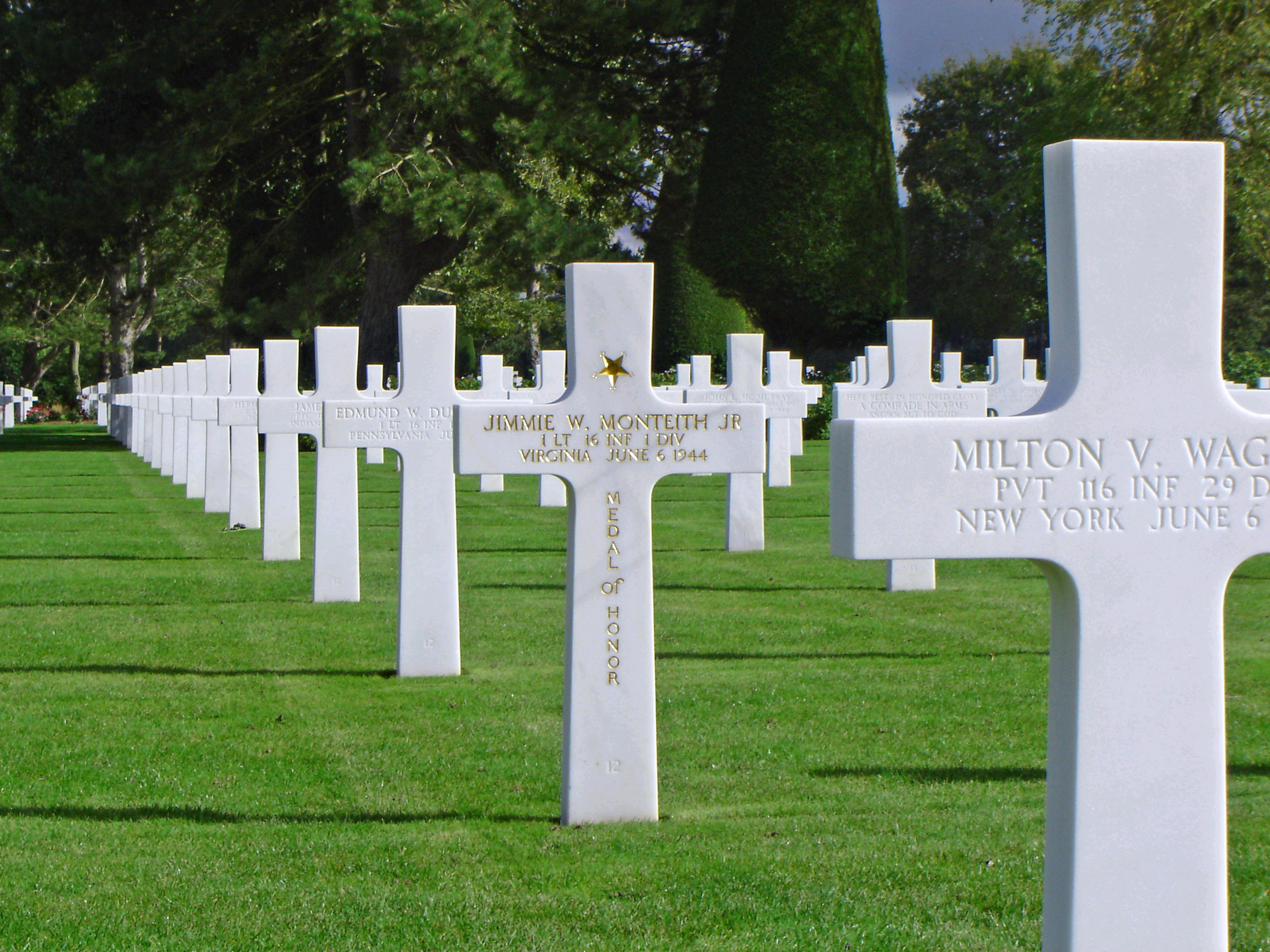
Monteith's grave marker at Normandy American Cemetery near Colleville-sur-Mer

He was drafted into the army in October 1941 and sent to Camp Croft, South Carolina, for basic training. During basic training, he was promoted to corporal and applied for officer training. He was accepted and sent to Fort Benning, Georgia, completing the course in March 1942, when he was commissioned a 2nd lieutenant. He was then transferred to Fort McClellan, Alabama, where he helped train the 15th Battalion. In February 1943, he was transferred into the 30th Division at Camp Blanding, Florida, to begin training in preparation for being shipped overseas to fight in the war. In April 1943 he was shipped to Algeria, where he joined the 1st Infantry Division (Big Red One). The division moved to Sicily in July 1943, and he received a field promotion to 1st lieutenant during the campaign. The division moved to England in November 1943 to prepare for the Normandy invasion. It was during the D-Day invasion that he was killed.

He is buried at the American cemetery in Normandy, Colleville-sur-Mer, Basse-Normandie, France. His grave can be found in section I, row 20, grave 12.

== Medal of Honor citation ==
General Orders: War Department, General Orders No. 20 (March 29, 1945)

"The President of the United States in the name of The Congress takes pleasure in presenting the Medal of Honor (Posthumously) to

First Lieutenant (Infantry) Jimmie W. Montieth Jr.
United States Army

for service as set forth in the following CITATION:

For conspicuous gallantry and intrepidity above and beyond the call of duty on 6 June 1944, while serving with 16th Infantry Regiment, 1st Infantry Division, in action near Colleville-sur-Mer, France. First Lieutenant Monteith landed with the initial assault waves on the coast of France under heavy enemy fire. Without regard to his own personal safety he continually moved up and down the beach reorganizing men for further assault. He then led the assault over a narrow protective ledge and across the flat, exposed terrain to the comparative safety of a cliff. Retracing his steps across the field to the beach, he moved over to where two tanks were buttoned up and blind under violent enemy artillery and machinegun fire. Completely exposed to the intense fire, First Lieutenant Monteith led the tanks on foot through a minefield and into firing positions. Under his direction several enemy positions were destroyed. He then rejoined his company and under his leadership his men captured an advantageous position on the hill. Supervising the defense of his newly won position against repeated vicious counterattacks, he continued to ignore his own personal safety, repeatedly crossing the 200 or 300 yards of open terrain under heavy fire to strengthen links in his defensive chain. When the enemy succeeded in completely surrounding First Lieutenant Monteith and his unit and while leading the fight out of the situation, First Lieutenant Monteith was killed by enemy fire. The courage, gallantry, and intrepid leadership displayed by First Lieutenant Monteith is worthy of emulation.

/S/ Franklin D. Roosevelt"

== Awards and decorations ==

Badge	Combat Infantryman Badge		
1st row	Medal of Honor		
2nd row	Bronze Star Medal	Purple Heart	American Defense Service Medal
3rd row	American Campaign Medal	European–African–Middle Eastern Campaign Medal with Arrowhead Device and 2 Campaign stars	World War II Victory Medal
Unit awards	Presidential Unit Citation		

== Posthumous honors ==
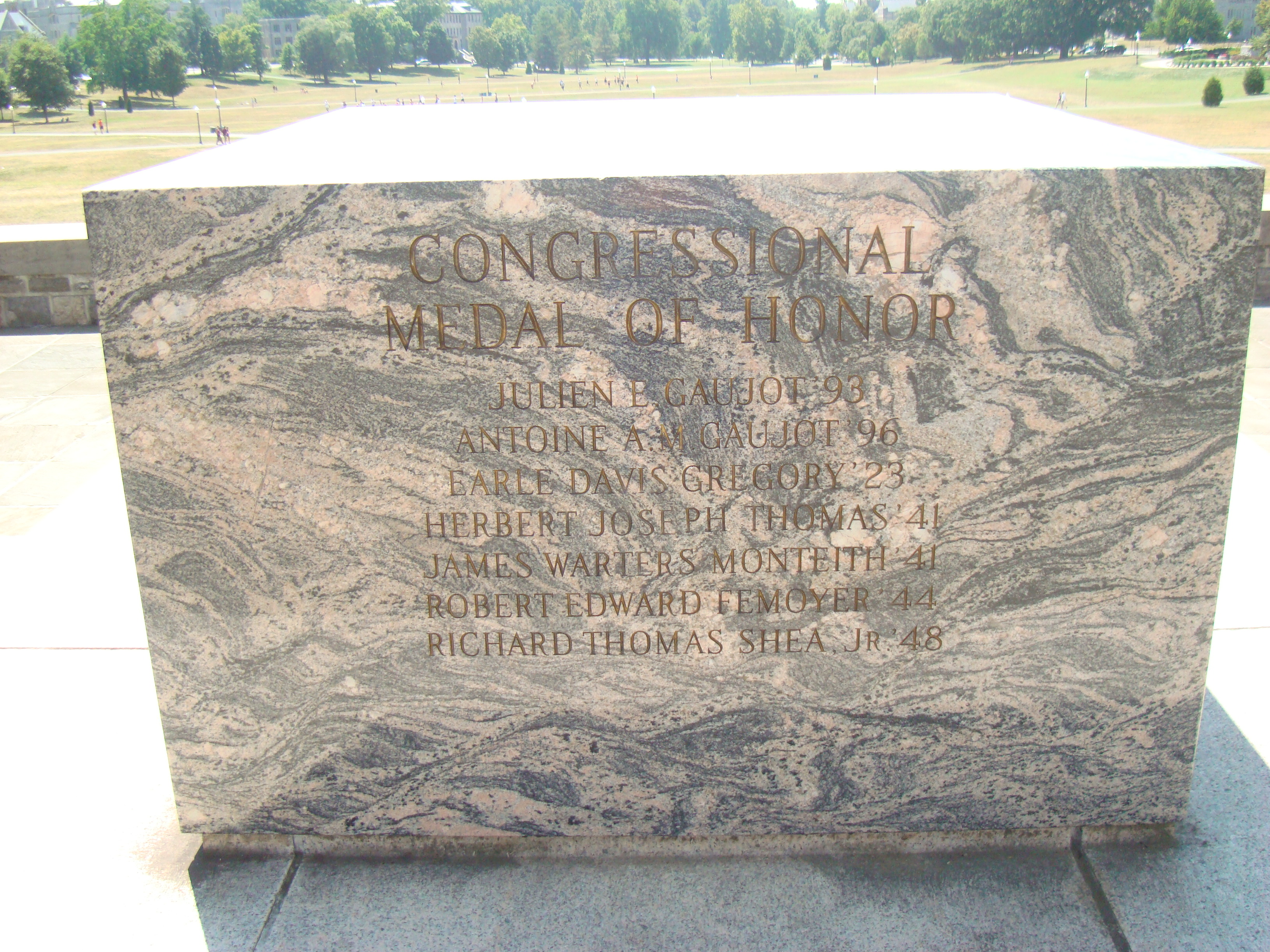
Monteith's name, listed as "James Warters Monteith," on Virginia Tech's Cenotaph.

- Camp Monteith, a U.S. military base named in his honor, located in Gnjilane, Kosovo.
- Monteith Hall at Virginia Tech, built in 1949 and named after alumnus First Lieutenant Jimmie W. Monteith Jr.
- Jimmie W. Monteith Jr. Amphitheater, Fort McClellan, Alabama
- Jimmie W. Monteith Jr. Barracks, Furth, Germany
- Jimmie W. Monteith Jr. Army Reserve Center, McGuire Veterans Administration Hospital
- Monteith Street, Fort Rucker, Alabama
- Jimmie W. Monteith Memorial Bridge, at the Low Moor exit of I-64 in Alleghany County, Virginia
- 1LT Jimmie Monteith United States Army Reserve Center, Richmond, Virginia

== See also ==
- List of Medal of Honor recipients
