= Robert Monteith (politician) =

Scottish politician and philanthropist 1812–1884

Robert Monteith (1811 – 31 March 1884), DL, JP, was a Scottish politician and philanthropist, Deputy Lieutenant for the County of Lanark.

== Family ==
Robert Monteith was born in Glasgow, the only son of Henry Monteith (d. 1848), twice Lord Provost of Glasgow and MP for Lanark Burghs, and his first wife, Christian Cameron.

He was educated at Glasgow University and Trinity College, Cambridge, where he was a member of the Cambridge Apostles. He converted to the Roman Catholic Church in 1846 and was a prominent Christian socialist.

In 1844, in a ceremony performed by his nephew, the Revd Francis Garden, he married Wilhelmina Anna Catherine Mellish, third daughter of the late Joseph Mellish of Blythe, Nottinghamshire, the British Consul and Minister Plenipotentiary at Hamburgh. They lived at Carstairs House.

Their son was Joseph Monteith. Their daughter was Mary Frances Monteith, she married Francis Ernest Kerr, son of Reverend Lord Henry Francis Charles Kerr, younger son of William Kerr, 6th Marquess of Lothian, and Louisa Dorothea Hope, daughter of General The Hon Sir Alexander Hope (British Army officer)

Robert Monteith died at Carstairs House on 31 March 1884; his widow would die there on 18 April.

== Career ==
He was appointed Deputy Lieutenant for the County of Lanarkshire on 27 October 1855.

On 9 February 1870, he accompanied David Urquhart to a private audience with Pope Pius IX.
