= Robert Monteith of Salmonet =

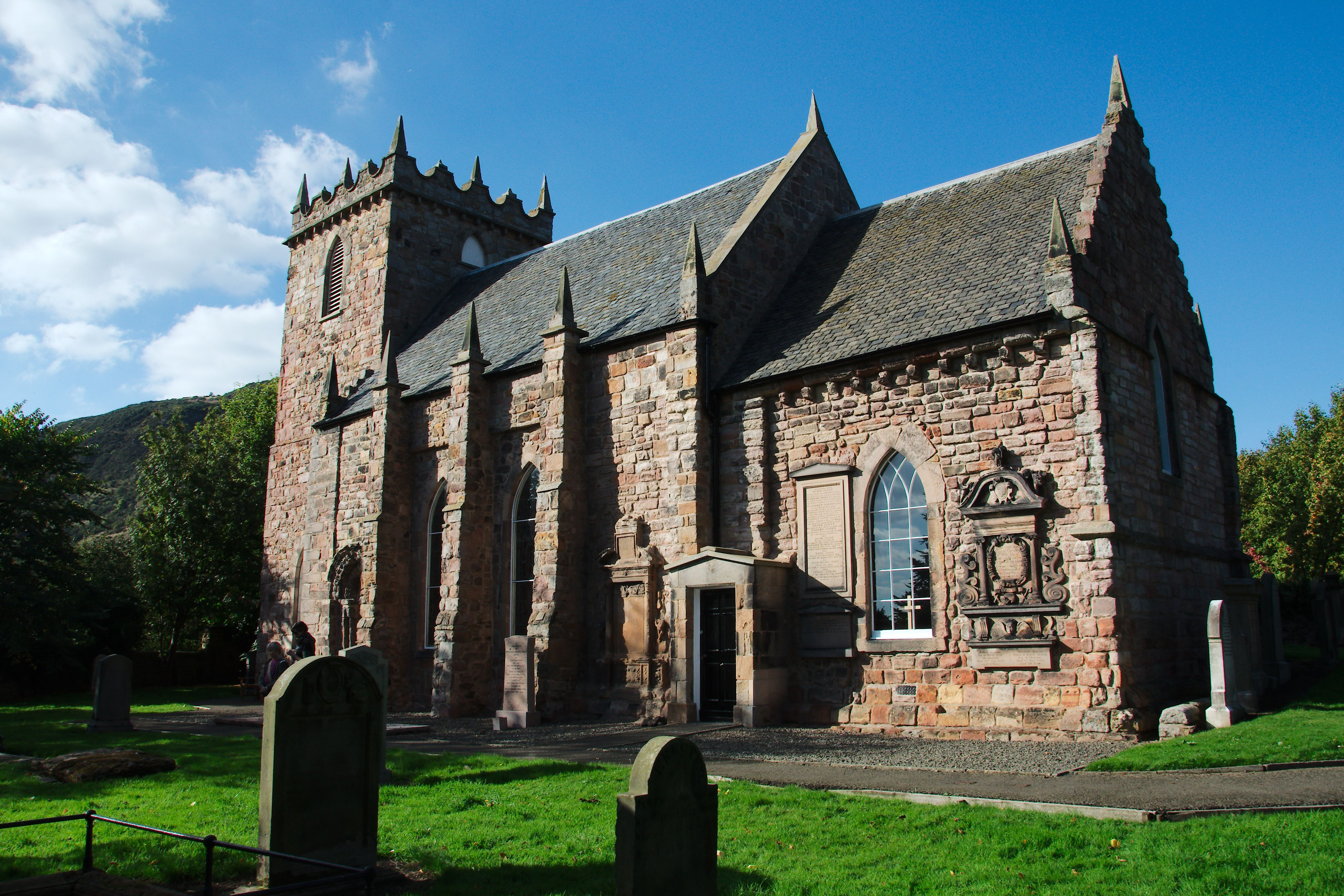
Duddingston Kirk is virtually unaltered since Monteith's tenure

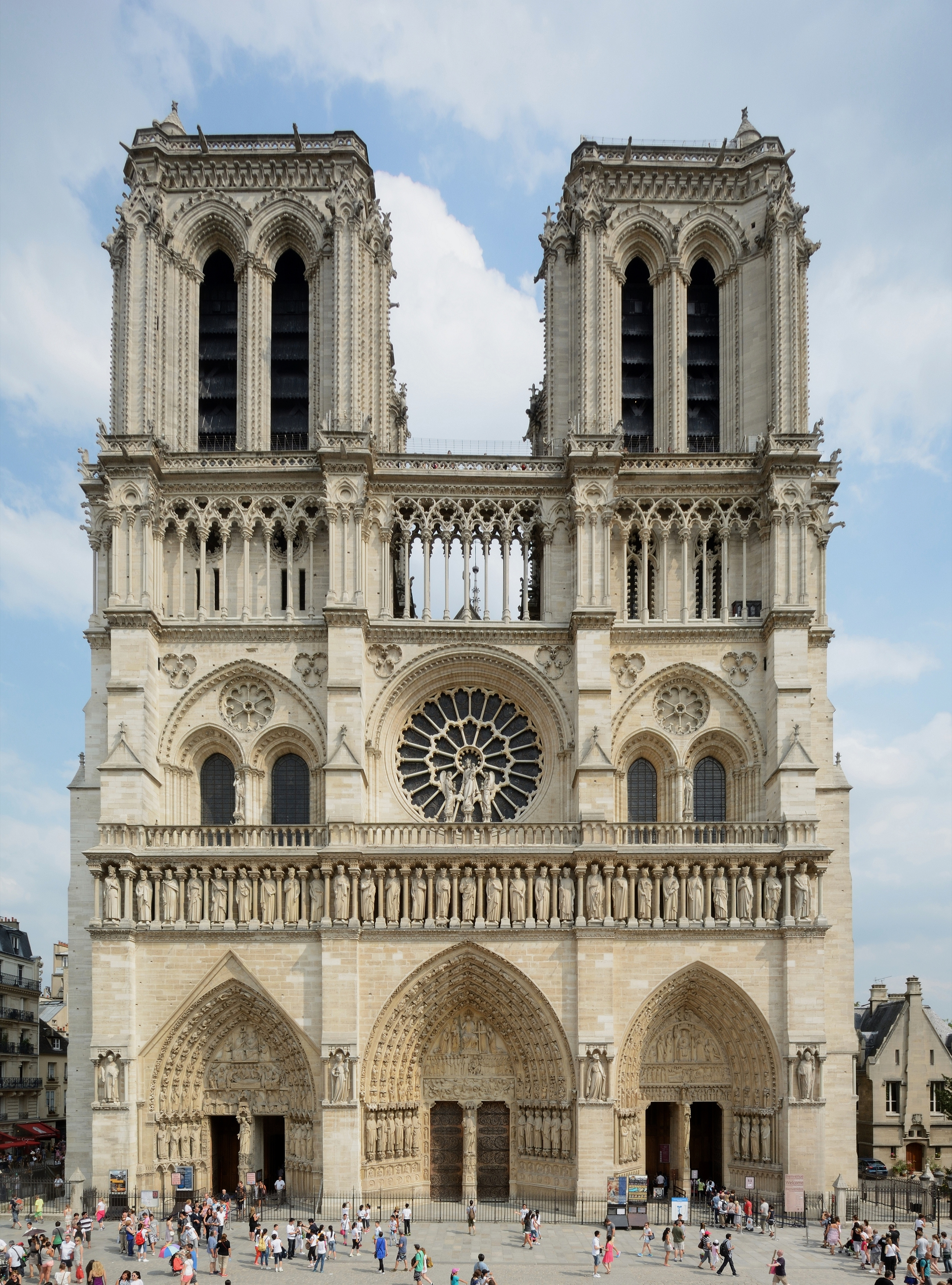
Notre Dame de Paris

Robert Monteith of Salmonet (1603–1660) was a colourful character who abandoned his role as a Presbyterian minister in the Church of Scotland to join the Roman Catholic Church where he rose to be a Canon in Notre Dame de Paris, France.

He claimed descent from the Menteiths or Monteiths of Stirlingshire where his family had held a property at the small hamlet of Salmonet, near Grange, Sterlingshire. However this was not an official aristocratic title nor were the family lairds of the land. This story was further corrupted by historians saying that his father was a salmon fisher (using nets) west of Alloa.

== Life ==
He was born in January 1603 and baptised on 25 January 1603. He was the third and youngest son of Alexander Monteith, an Edinburgh merchant, and his wife, Rachel Sandilands. He attended the High School in Edinburgh then studied at Edinburgh University from 1617, gaining an MA in 1621.

He obtained a post as Professor of Philosophy at the University of Saumur in western France where he worked for four years. This was a Protestant university within a Catholic country.

In 1629 he was nominated by two Edinburgh professors for the role of Professor of Divinity at Edinburgh University but this was opposed by ministers and the regent of the university.

Returning to Scotland he was presented by King Charles I to the Archbishop John Spottiswoode of St Andrews where he was given a post of minister of Duddingston Kirk on the southern edge of Edinburgh in December 1630. However, in a very ungodly act, he was found to be conducting an "illicit amour" with Dame Anna Hepburn, wife of Sir James Hamilton of Priestfield. This couple were almost certainly members of his congregation, Priestfield (Prestonfield) House lying a mile west of the church. This clearly was scandalous behaviour in a small village such as Duddingston. Monteith fled the country (to France) and in October 1633 was formally denounced (somewhat inaccurately) as a "rebel". He remained in France and converted to the Roman Catholic faith.

He spent time in the company of Cardinal Richelieu and was appointed personal secretary to M. de la Port, then to Cardinal De Retz (son of Henri de Gondi, duc de Retz). De Retz who was a Cardinal at Notre Dame placed Monteith as a Canon in Notre Dame, a truly privileged position for any man, and highly unusual as a non-French citizen. This reflects both his fluency in French and the respect with which he was held in the French church.

In France he had many powerful and influential friends, both in the church and in the French court. In the latter in 1641 he befriended Michel de Marolles who was much impressed by his wit and intelligence. In 1652 when Cardinal de Retz (Monteith's superior) was arrested in the Louvre, Monteith was sheltered by Marolles at the Abbey of Baugerais near Touraine.

He died in France in September 1660.

== Publications ==
- Humble Remonstrance made to Prince Charles II, King of Great Britain (1652)
- History of the Troubles of Great Britain from 1633 to 1649 (1649 plus posthumous reprint in 1661) translated into English in 1735 by Captain James Ogilvie.

== Family ==
He married Marion Broun some time around 1630. It is unclear if she fled to France with him. She died in 1639.

Little is known of his long-suffering wife, but he had two sons: Robert Monteith and William Monteith. His brother (not his son) was William Monteith of Carruber and Randeford, from whom the Stuart Menteiths of Closeburn are descended.
