= Camp Monteith =

Military base in Kosovo

Coordinates: 42.465°N 21.480°E

- Gjilan, Kosovo
- A blindfolded KLA prisoner awaits interrogation at Camp Monteith in June 1999

Site information
- Type: Military base
- Controlled by: United States Marine Corps (1999); United States Army (1999–2007); Kosovo Security Forces (2007–present)

Location
- Location of the military base Camp Monteith within Kosovo

Site history
- In use: 1999–present

Garrison information
- Current commander: Berat Shala

Camp Monteith is a Kosovo Security Force base in Gjilan, Kosovo, about 20 miles (32 km) east of Camp Bondsteel. A former Yugoslav artillery outpost and 79 parcels of private land, the area was taken over by U.S. Marines and used as a base of operation during the Kosovo War of 1999. The camp was named after Jimmie W. Monteith, who received the Medal of Honor for heroism in France during World War II. At its peak, the camp housed 2000 soldiers and civilian contractors. Established in June 1999 to be used as a staging point for the bulk of U.S. forces stationed in the Multi National Brigade-East. Initially occupied by U.S. Marines, over the past seven years successive rotations of U.S. Army soldiers have used the camp as part of NATO’s KFOR.

The base camp originally consisted of one main building, used as a command post and makeshift interrogation center, as well as a few small outbuildings that had been stripped by retreating Yugoslav forces. The other buildings were destroyed previously by bombing during Operation Allied Force.

== History ==
Initially the United States Marine Corps occupied the land during Operation Joint Guardian setting up camp around the main building in tents and in their vehicles, and patrolling Gjilan and the surrounding villages. In July 1999, U.S. Navy Seabees, along with Kellogg Brown & Root (KBR), began construction of more permanent structures, with plumbing and electricity including a vast number of semi-permanent barracks known as South East Asia huts (SEAhuts). The camp continued to be used by peacekeeping forces up until early 2006 when the remaining soldiers relocated to Camp Bondsteel. The camp was closed to U.S. personnel in March 2007 and as of July 2007 has been transferred to the Kosovo Security Force.

By December 2017, the camp housed the First Battalion of the KSF's Rapid Reaction Brigade. The first three Serb members of the KSF were accepted in 2009 from the previous KPC and joined the First Rapid Reaction Battalion. The Second Battalion was located at the "NATO Soldier" barracks in Istog, a former Spanish KFOR base, and the third battalion seemingly in Mitrovica, Kosovo.
