= Ian Stapleton (architect) =

Australian architect

- Born: 23 March 1951; Cudal, Australia
- Died: 11 June 2023 (aged 72); Sydney, Australia
- Occupation: Architect

Ian Stapleton was an Australian heritage architect and a partner at Lucas, Stapleton, Johnson and Partners. a heritage architectural firm in Australia. Stapleton carried out and contributed to heritage projects throughout Australia, including the Finger Wharf, Walsh Bay, Sydney General Post Office and officials’ houses at Port Arthur, Tasmania.

He was also active in the National Trust of Australia, the NSW Heritage Council and Australia ICOMOS. Stapleton also published works on Australian architectural styles and was a visiting lecturer at various Sydney schools of architecture and building. His 2013 renovation of the childhood home of Don Bradman won a New South Wales National Trust heritage award.

== Early years ==
Stapleton was the younger son of farmers at Cudal. He began his education at Cudal Central School, where his mother was an Infants teacher. Later he was dux of his year (1969) at Wolaroi College, Orange, and studied Architecture at the University of Sydney (1970-1975), whilst living at Wesley College, University of Sydney.

== Career ==
Stapleton was first employed as an architectural cadet for the New South Wales Public Works Department. He worked in the Special Projects Section of the NSW Government Architect’s Branch.

In 1977 he took a job with Fisher Lucas, a partnership of Clive Lucas & Fisher Hudson, Sydney Architects. He planned the restoration and rejuvenation of thirteen terrace houses in the Woolloomooloo urban regeneration project; the restoration of Glenlee, Menangle, for the MacArthur Development Board; Willandra, Ryde for the Ryde City Council and Bronte House for Waverley Council. In the early 1980s, with his partner, Maisy Stapleton, he published a series of articles in the Sydney Morning Herald on building restoration and Australian house styles. As part of his work, Stapleton conducted research on the history of buildings.

By the late 1980s and early 1990s Stapleton had joined a number of institutional and government heritage committees; he was president of Australia ICOMOS from 1992 to 1994, and worked on the organization's Burra Charter, which focused on the continuing use of historic places.

From the early 1990s, Stapleton took part in two large Sydney heritage conservation projects: the Finger Wharf and the Sydney General Post Office. The Finger Wharf was converted to hotel and apartment use. The commercial use of what had been public space was subject to criticism in the press.

Stapleton designed the restoration of the old buildings of the Sydney General Post Office, which were strengthened for earthquake and converted to hotel, function and retail uses, whilst maintaining the historic content and providing a new post office on George Street. In association with the Buchan Group, Melbourne, he helped to create a large roofed urban space in the buildings’ courtyard.

== Other selected restorations ==
- Don Bradman's house, Bowral
- Façade of the Pitt Street Uniting Church (1841)
- St Andrew’s Rectory, Seven Hills (1891)
- Buildings at Victoria Barracks, Sydney (from 1840s)
- Swan Brewery, Perth (1879)
- Boronia House, Mosman (1886)
- Old MLC Building, Sydney (1930s)
- The Hermitage, The Oaks (1841)
- Her Majesty’s Theatre, Ballarat (1874)
- Winter House, Telopea (Walter Burley Griffin, 1938)
- Blackdown Homestead, Bathurst (1823)
- The Merchant’s House, The Rocks (1848)
- Palm House and glasshouses, Royal Botanic Garden, Sydney (from 1876)
- Wyoming, Birchgrove (G.A. Mansfield, 1881)
- Macleay Museum Building, University of Sydney (1887)
- The Briars, Wollstonecraft (Donald Esplin, 1914)

== Publications ==
- Architects of Australia (Bruce Dellit & Emil Sodersten), Macmillan Publishers, 1981 (co-author)
- Sydney Morning Herald, articles on restoration and architecture, 1981 - 1990
- How to Restore the Old Aussie House, Flannel Flower Press: editions 1983, 1991 & 2008
- Colour Schemes for Old Australian Houses, Flannel Flower Press, 1984 (co-author)
- More Colour Schemes for Old Australian Houses, Flannel Flower Press, 1993 (co-author)
- Australian House Styles, Flannel Flower Press: editions 1997 and 2010 (co-author)
- The Illustrated Burra Charter, Australia ICOMOS, 1992 (co-project manager)
- Contributions to Encyclopaedia of Australian Architecture, Cambridge University Press, 4 entries, 2008

== Awards ==
Stapleton's work won many Australian Institute of Architects’ merit awards and the Adrian Ashton Award for Architectural Journalism. His firm also won several National Trust Award.
