= Aubrey Reeder =

Australian Archdeacon

- Died: 2 June 1987
- Occupation: Archdeacon

Aubrey Provost Reeder was an Australian Archdeacon of the 20th century.

Reeder was ordained in 1944 and served curacies in Bathurst, Trundle and Coolah. He was also a Diocesan Youth Officer for Bathurst from 1957 to 1963. He held incumbencies at Cudal, Coonamble and Mudgee. He was Archdeacon of Barker from 1983 to 1986.

Reeder died on 2 June 1987.
