= The Gunnery, Woolloomooloo =

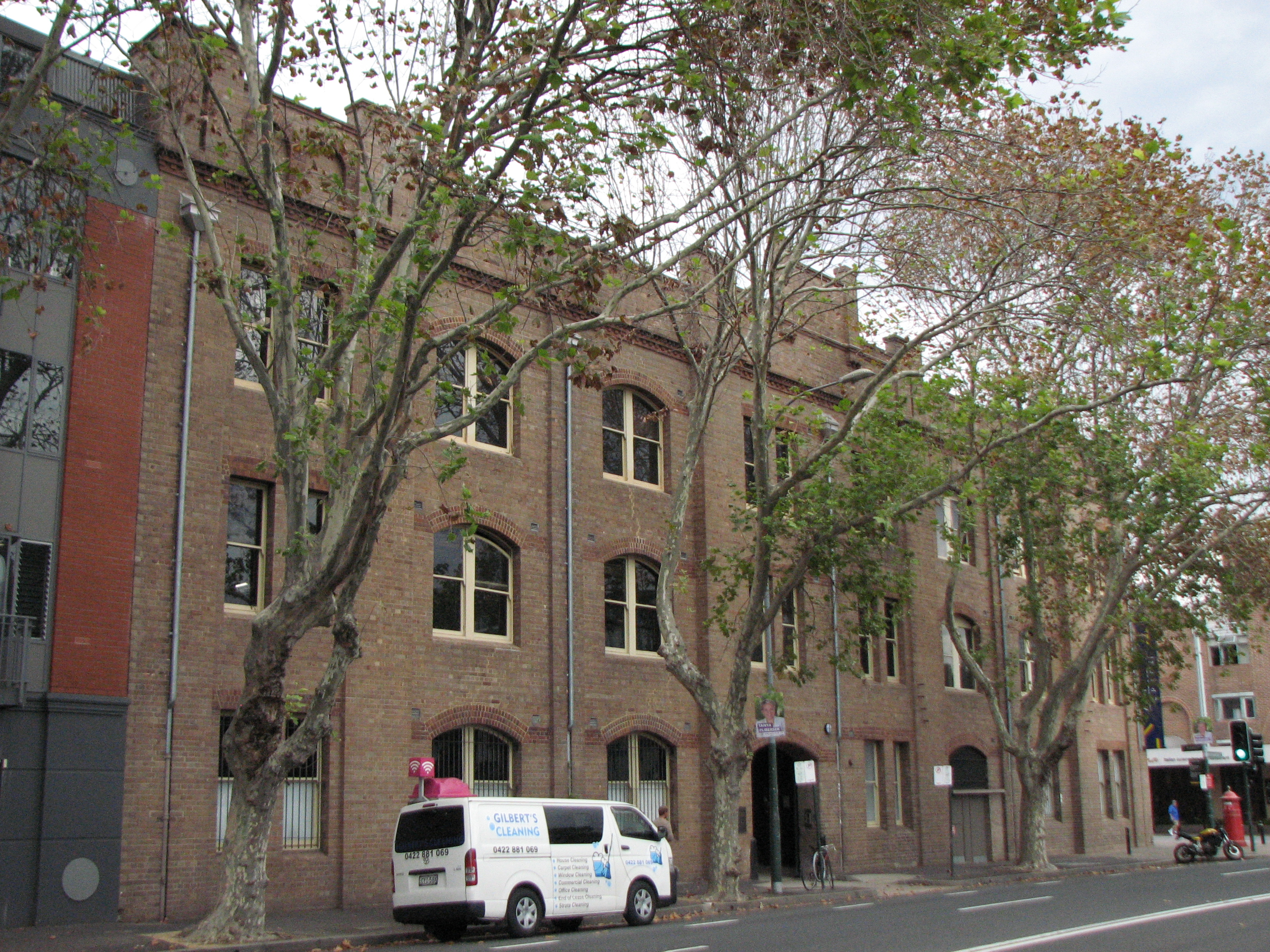
- The Gunnery, 43–51 Cowper Wharf Roadway, Woolloomooloo

- Location of The Gunnery in the Sydney central business district The Gunnery, Woolloomooloo (Australia)
- 33°52′10″S 151°13′15″E
- Location: 43–51 Cowper Wharf Roadway, Woolloomooloo, City of Sydney, New South Wales, Australia

Site notes
- Owner: Housing NSW

New South Wales Heritage Register
- Official name: The Gunnery
- Type: State heritage (built)
- Designated: 2 April 1999
- Reference no.: 927
- Type: historic site

The Gunnery, Woolloomooloo is a heritage-listed historic site located at 43–51 Cowper Wharf Roadway, in the inner city Sydney suburb of Woolloomooloo, New South Wales, Australia. It is also known as The Gunnery. The property is owned by the Housing NSW, an agency of the Government of New South Wales. It was added to the New South Wales State Heritage Register on 2 April 1999.

== History ==
The building now known as The Gunnery was built c.1900. It was erected as a bulk store for the Sydney Morning Herald newspaper. During World War II the Commonwealth Government acquired the building for defence purposes and the Royal Australian Navy used it as a gunnery and instructional centre for trainees to practice their gunnery skills.

HMAS Mindari, the former training site, was commissioned on 1 July 1945 and was decommissioned on 30 April 1948 and was initially used as a naval film laboratory and cinema before being repurposed as the Gunnery Art Gallery under the management of the Ministry for the Arts.

A newspaper article in 1945 reported that HMAS Mindari is a gunnery instructional centre in Woolloomooloo. Its principal activity has been the training of Australian and Allied merchant seamen in the use of guns. For this it used a "dome," on the ceiling of which a cinema projects a plane. Members of the class shoot at this with Oerlikons and Bofors guns while attempts to distract their aim are made by the realistic sound of guns and planes."

== Present use ==
After extensive renovations, in 2023, The Gunnery was reopened as a revitalised contemporary art space operated by Artspace and supported by the NSW Government. The transformation works were completed by Sydney-based architectural firm DunnHillam Architecture + Urban Design.

== Heritage listing ==
The Gunnery was listed on the New South Wales State Heritage Register on 2 April 1999.
