= Cudal, New South Wales =

Cudal
- Town
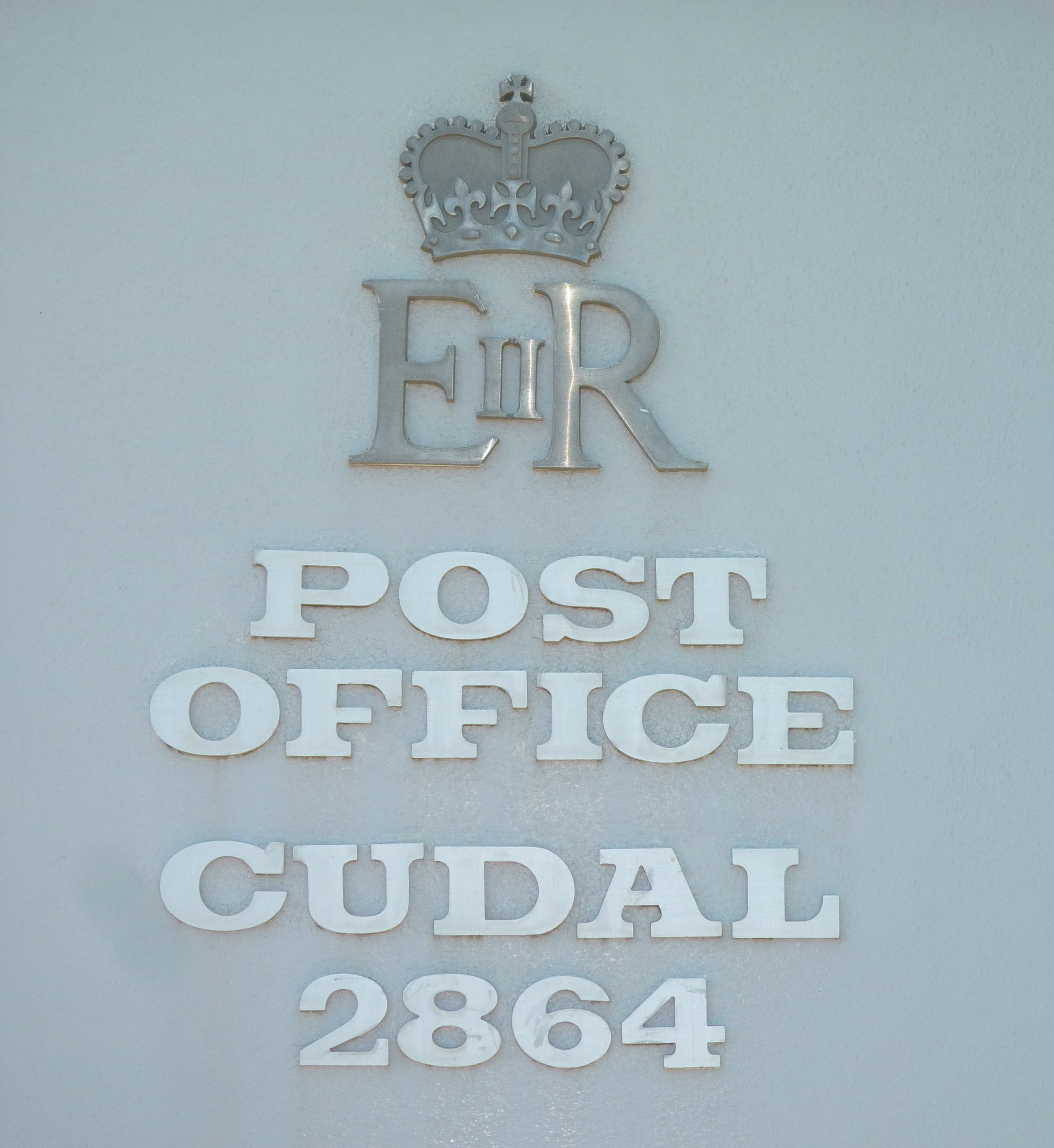
- Post office

- Coordinates: 33°17′0″S 148°45′0″E
- Country: Australia
- State: New South Wales
- LGA: Cabonne Shire Council
- Location: 296 km (184 mi) W of Sydney; 39 km (24 mi) W of Orange; 66 km (41 mi) N of Cowra

Government
  - State electorate: Orange
  - Federal division: Calare

Population
  - Total: 339 (2011 census)
- Postcode: 2864

Cudal (/ˈkjuːdæl/ KEW-dal) is a town in the Central West region of New South Wales, Australia, on the traditional lands of the Wiradjuri people. Cudal is in the Cabonne Shire Council local government area, 296 kilometres (184 mi) west of the state capital, Sydney. The town was first surveyed in 1867. Running through the town is "Boree Creek". Platypodes are common in the Boree Creek, giving Cudal the catchline 'home of the platypus' on signs entering the town. The place name, Cudal, could have derived from an Aboriginal word meaning 'flat'. At the 2011 census, Cudal had a population of 339. Industry and commerce in Cudal is a mixture of retail, government services, and agriculture (sheep, canola). Cudal is surrounded by fertile basalt soils, the result of lava flows from Gaanha Bula Mount Canobolas, 30 kilometres to the east.

== History ==
Major Thomas Mitchell left on his exploration of inland Australia from the historic homestead Boree Cabonne near Cudal in 1835.

Two factors contributed to the establishment of the town of Cudal. One was the 1860s free selection laws of New South Wales, allowing people to move to newer areas of the colony. The second was the need to access the gold fields in Forbes, which required the crossing of Boree Creek. Cudal is situated on the banks of Boree Creek. As a mid way point between Orange and Canowindra and Eugowra, it was a place to rest, see to horses and stay safe from bushrangers. Cudal was first surveyed in 1867. In 1882 the town had two churches, a bank, a public school (founded 1876), five stores, three hotels and a mixture of other businesses.

Cudal is located on The Escort Way, an important road within NSW for the transport of gold from the diggings to the main commercial centres. Consequently, bushrangers, including Ben Hall and Frank Gardiner, operated in the area.

Many men from the district participated in war as part of the duty for King and country. The memorial park gates on Main Street honour their service and list those who made the supreme sacrifice.

The wooden trestle bridge crossing Boree Creek was severely damaged by floods in 1959 and was replaced by a concrete bridge.

Hazelton Airlines operated from Cudal airport, located on the flat country to the east of the village, from 1959. It used the airport as both an administrative centre and maintenance facility, until it ceased to operate in the 1990s. Hazeltons was a major employer in the village.

On 5 May 2015 a fire destroyed the Royal Hotel on Main Street. It has since been fully demolished.

=== Cordern's Store ===
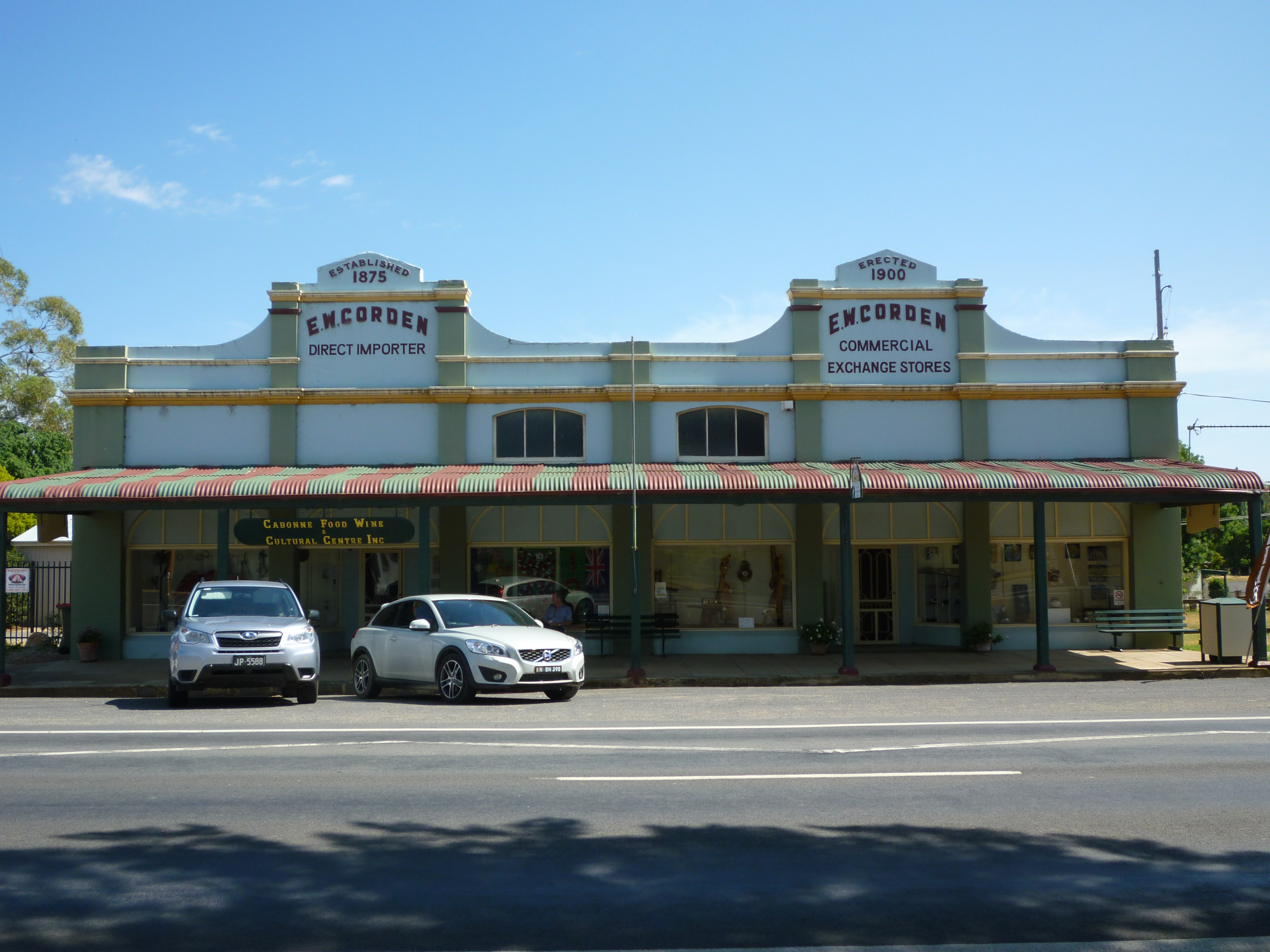
Store exterior in 2015

The Commercial Exchange Store, located on Main Street, was built in 1901. It replaced a previous Parkers building erected in 1875. The store was designed to offer for sale to the people of Cudal and district all the goods one would need from drapery to foods to tools. In 1921 the store was purchased by Mr. E. W. Cordern and the name changed to "Cordern's Store". The store operated until 1958. The building then was used by the local Boree Shire Council until 2001. At this point a group of local women took over the building and it has once again become the centre of Cudal retail, now known as the "Cabonne Food Wine and Cultural Centre". The centre includes a cafe, crafts, antiques, and a library. There are also a number of displays on people and items from the town history. Volunteers from the local community operate the store Friday - Sunday.

== Industry & Commerce ==
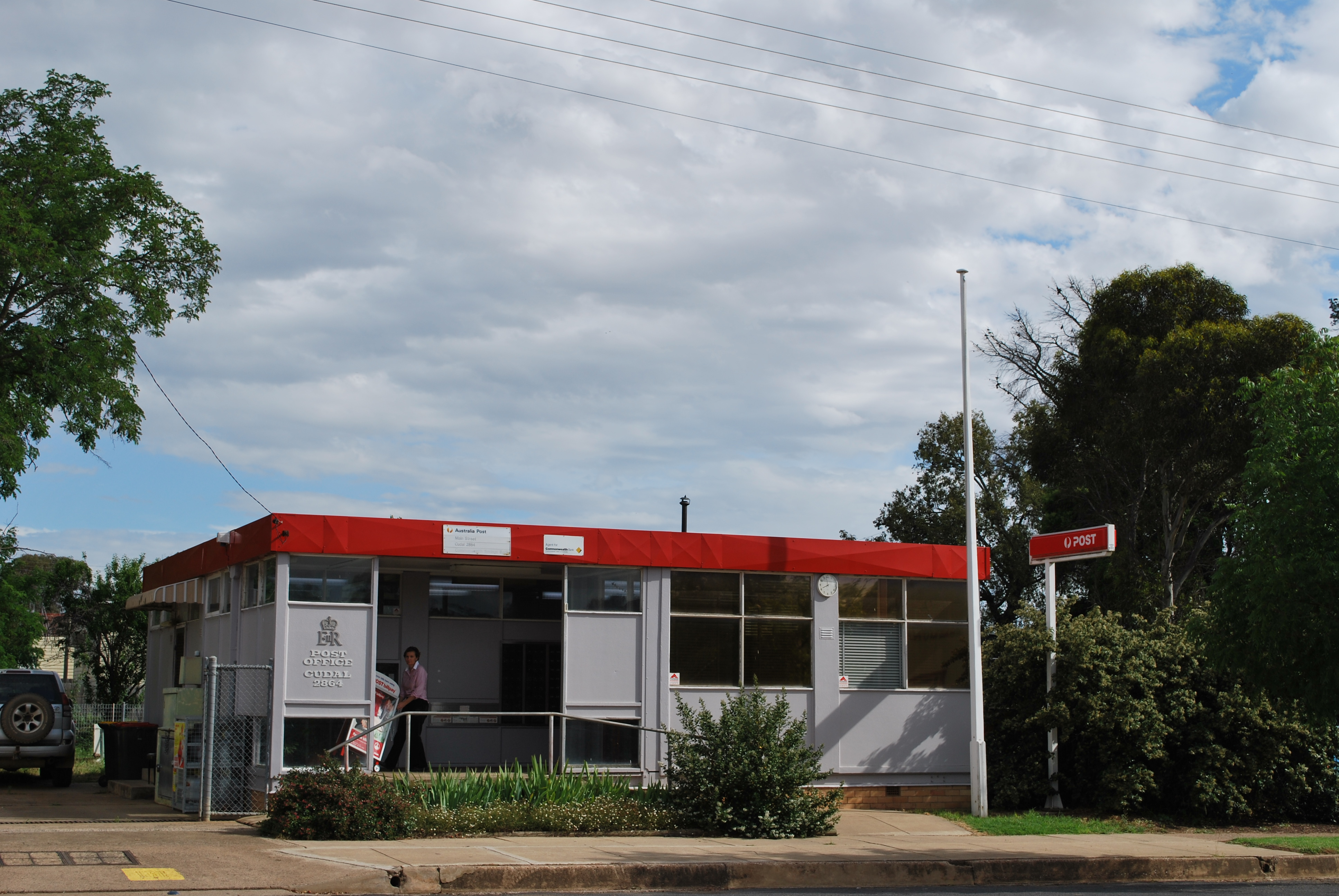
Cudal Post Office

Cudal has a mixture of retail stores including a cafe & general store, the above-mentioned Cabonne Food Wine & Cultural Centre, and an Australia Post Post Office. The Post Office acts as an agent for a number of banks including Commonwealth Bank, it also acts as a newsagency. An agency for the Credit Union is within the council office. The Bowling Club provides leisure activities and also has an onsite ATM. Shell has a 24-hour self-service filling point just off Main Street. A caravan park and motel provides accommodation for visitors. The town is suitable for RV users.

=== Cumulus Estate Wines ===
Within the Cudal district is the winery of Cumulus Estate Wines. This is the bottling and cellar facility for wine marques including "Rolling" (served on Qantas), "Climbing", and "Six Hundred Above". The winery has a 10,000 tonne vintage capacity, fermentation and maturation capabilities. It also has 8 million litres of wine storage capacity, mostly in an underground barrel hall carved into the area's volcanic stone. The barrel hall is also the setting for tasting dinners.

=== Monument Vineyard ===
The 250 acre Monument Vineyard is located within the Cudal district upon terra rosa soil. Within the vineyard itself there is also a cage free poultry farm housing approximately 240,000 laying hens.

== Government & Civil Services ==
Boree Shire Council was based at Cudal from 1906 until 1977, when it was amalgamated with Molong, Canobolas and part of Lyndhurst shires, to form Cabonne Shire.

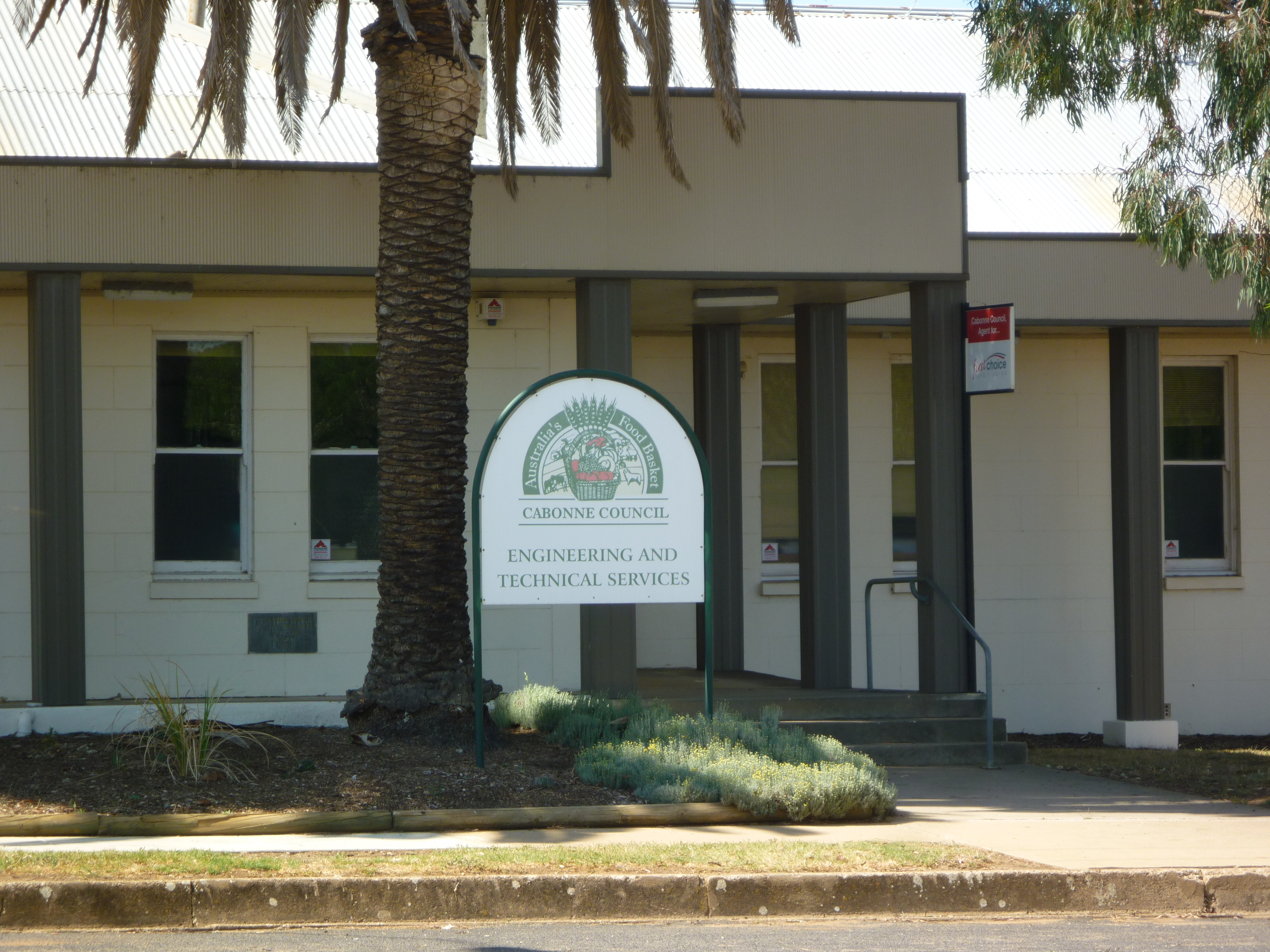
Cabonne Shire Offices

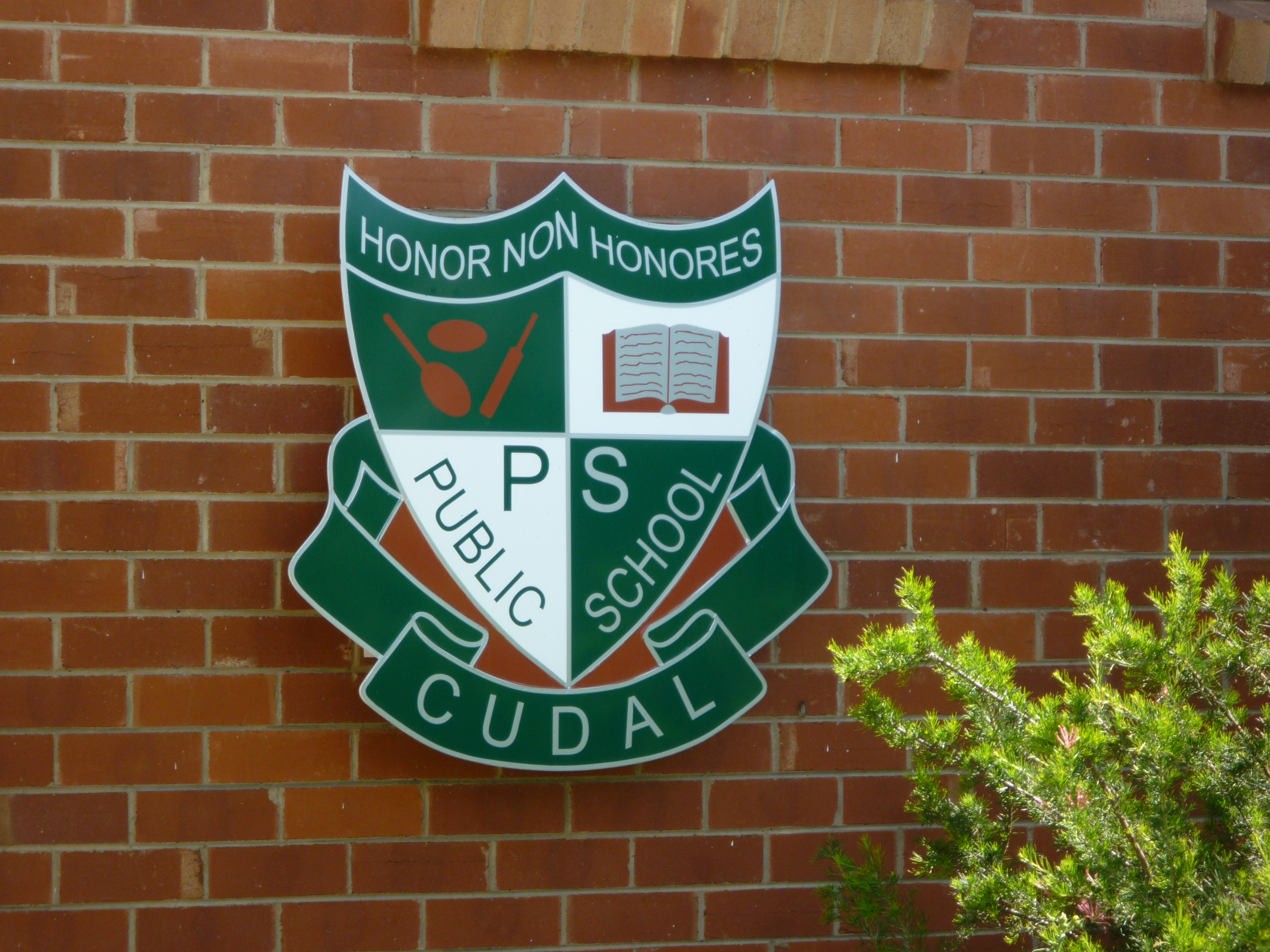
Cudal Public School Shield

Cabonne Shire has an office in Cudal as well as a works depot. The shire provides a swimming pool, playground / BBQ area, and community centre. Health services from the NSW Health are provided through rural nursing. The NSW Police Force has a station in the town.

== Education ==
Cudal Public School is a K-6 school for children of the town and district.

== Transport ==
NSW TrainLink has regular coach services through the town, connecting Cudal with Orange, Cootamundra (for Melbourne), Forbes, and Sydney.

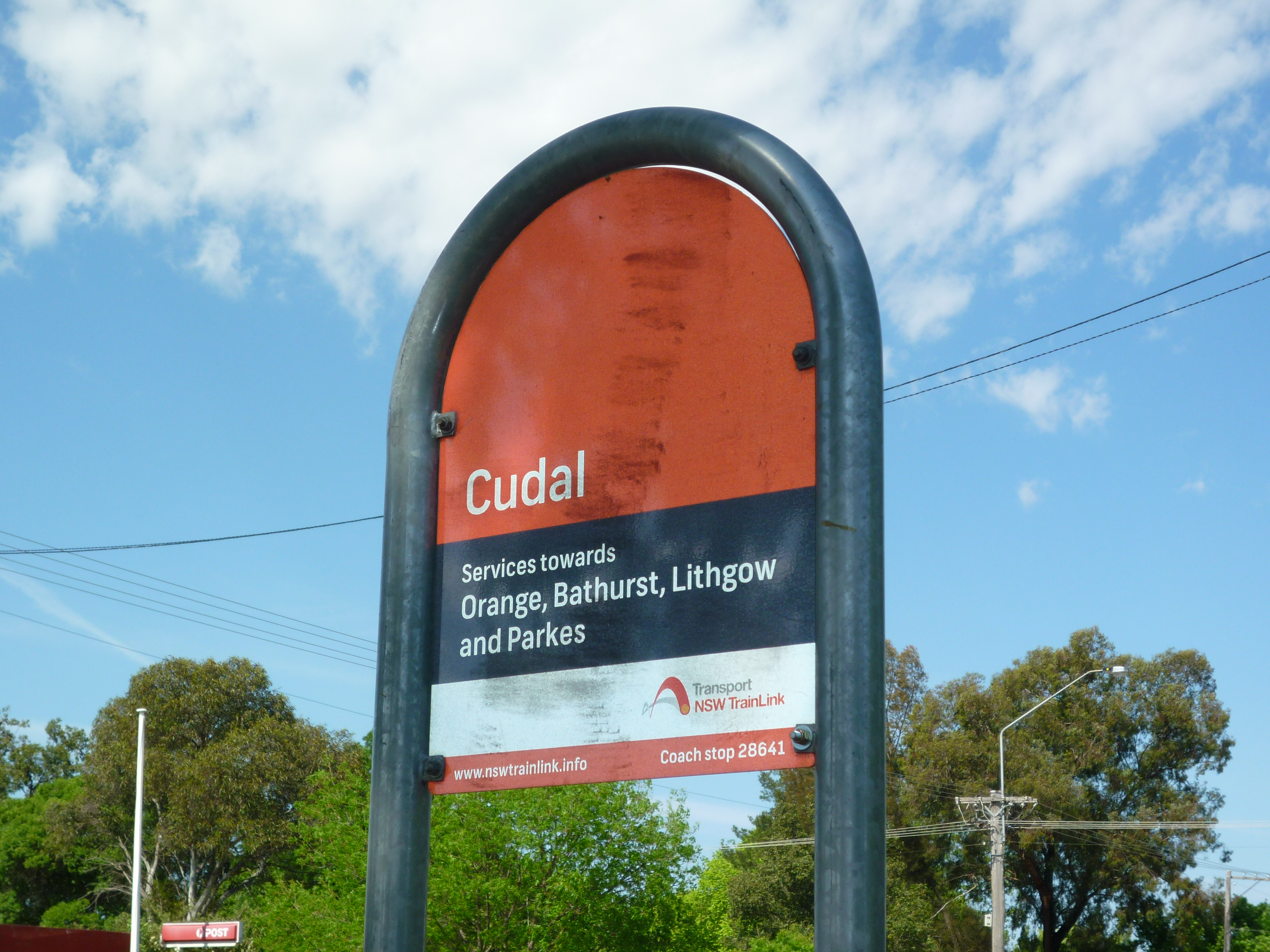
NSW TrainLink Service Stop Main Street 2015

== Churches ==
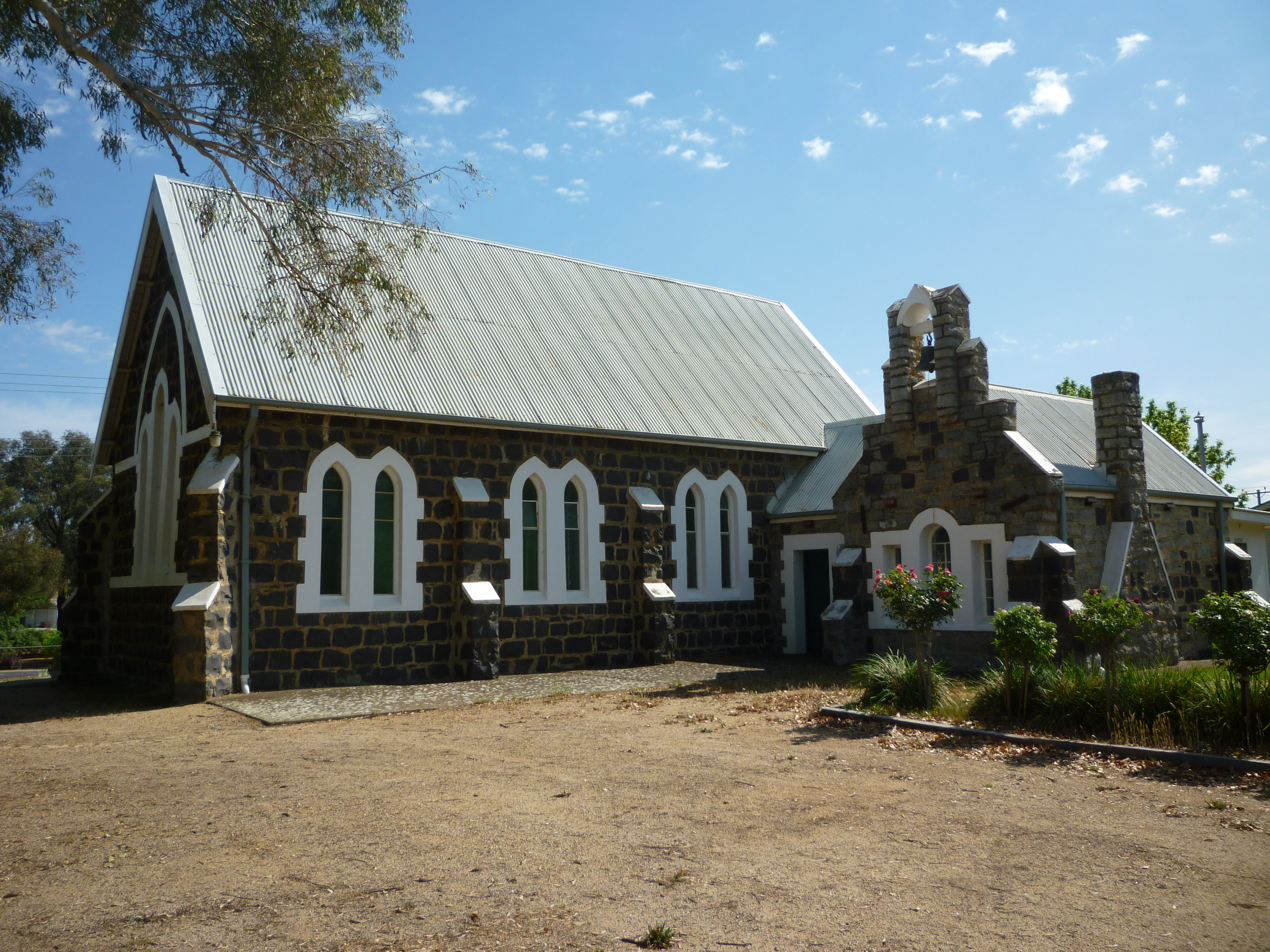
St. Columbanus' 2015

Cudal has three historic churches. The Catholic church of St. Columbanus, established in 1880. In 2025, following a survey by structural engineers, the Parish decided to close the church due to its deteriorated and unsafe condition, which made it unsuitable for use. Catholic services are now held in the Community Hall.

Services at the Church of England St. James which is a part of Anglican Parish of Cudal-Molong are conducted by a lay ministry.

The third building was a Uniting Church which has been sold to a private buyer.

== Notable Citizens ==
- Neville Sellwood, one of the greatest Australian jockeys of the 1950s and early 1960s. Born Brisbane 1922, raced in Australia, the USA, and the UK. Rode the Melbourne Cup winning horses in 1951 and 1955
- Ian Stapleton, restoration & heritage architect & author 1951-2023. Projects include the Sydney General Post Office; Finger Wharf, Don Bradman's home in Bowral, Blackdown homestead, Bathurst
