= Woolloomooloo =

Suburb of New South Wales, Australia

- Suburb
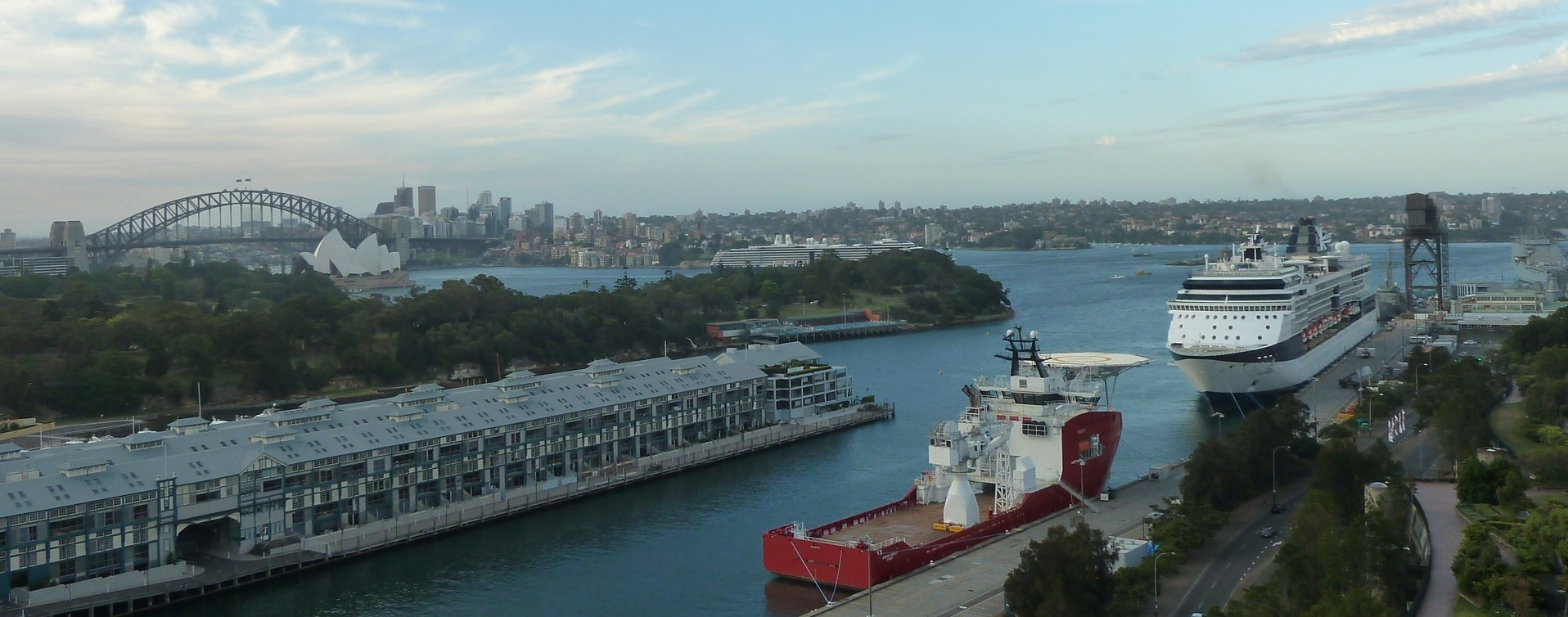
- Woolloomooloo Bay and the Finger Wharf. 2012

- Interactive map of Woolloomooloo
- Coordinates: 33°52′13″S 151°13′13″E
- Country: Australia
- State: New South Wales
- City: Sydney
- LGA: City of Sydney
- Location: 1.5 km (0.93 mi) east of Sydney CBD

Government
  - State electorate: Sydney
  - Federal division: Wentworth

Area
  - Total: 0.37 km^{2} (0.14 sq mi)

Population
  - Total: 3,792 (SAL 2021)
  - Density: 10,240/km^{2} (26,500/sq mi)
- Postcode: 2011
Suburbs around Woolloomooloo
Sydney CBD	Port Jackson	Potts Point
Sydney CBD	Woolloomooloo	Potts Point
East Sydney	Darlinghurst	Kings Cross

Woolloomooloo (/ˌwʊləməˈluː/ wuul-ə-mə-LOO) is a harbourside, inner-city eastern suburb of Sydney, New South Wales, Australia, 1.5 km (0.93 mi) east of the central business district, in the local government area of the City of Sydney. It is in a low-lying, former docklands area at the head of Woolloomooloo Bay, on Sydney Harbour. The Domain sits to the west, the locality of East Sydney is near the south-west corner of the suburb and the locality of Kings Cross is near the south-east corner. Potts Point is immediately to the east.

Woolloomooloo was originally a working-class district of Sydney and has only recently changed with gentrification of the inner city areas of Sydney. The redevelopment of the waterfront, particularly the construction of the housing development on the Finger Wharf, has caused major change. Areas of public housing still exist in the suburb, with 22% homes in the 2011 postcode, owned by Housing NSW, in front of Redfern, Eastlakes and Glebe.

Woolloomooloo is home to Artspace, an independent, not-for-profit, contemporary art space which is located in the heritage-listed Gunnery building.

== History ==
=== Aboriginal culture ===
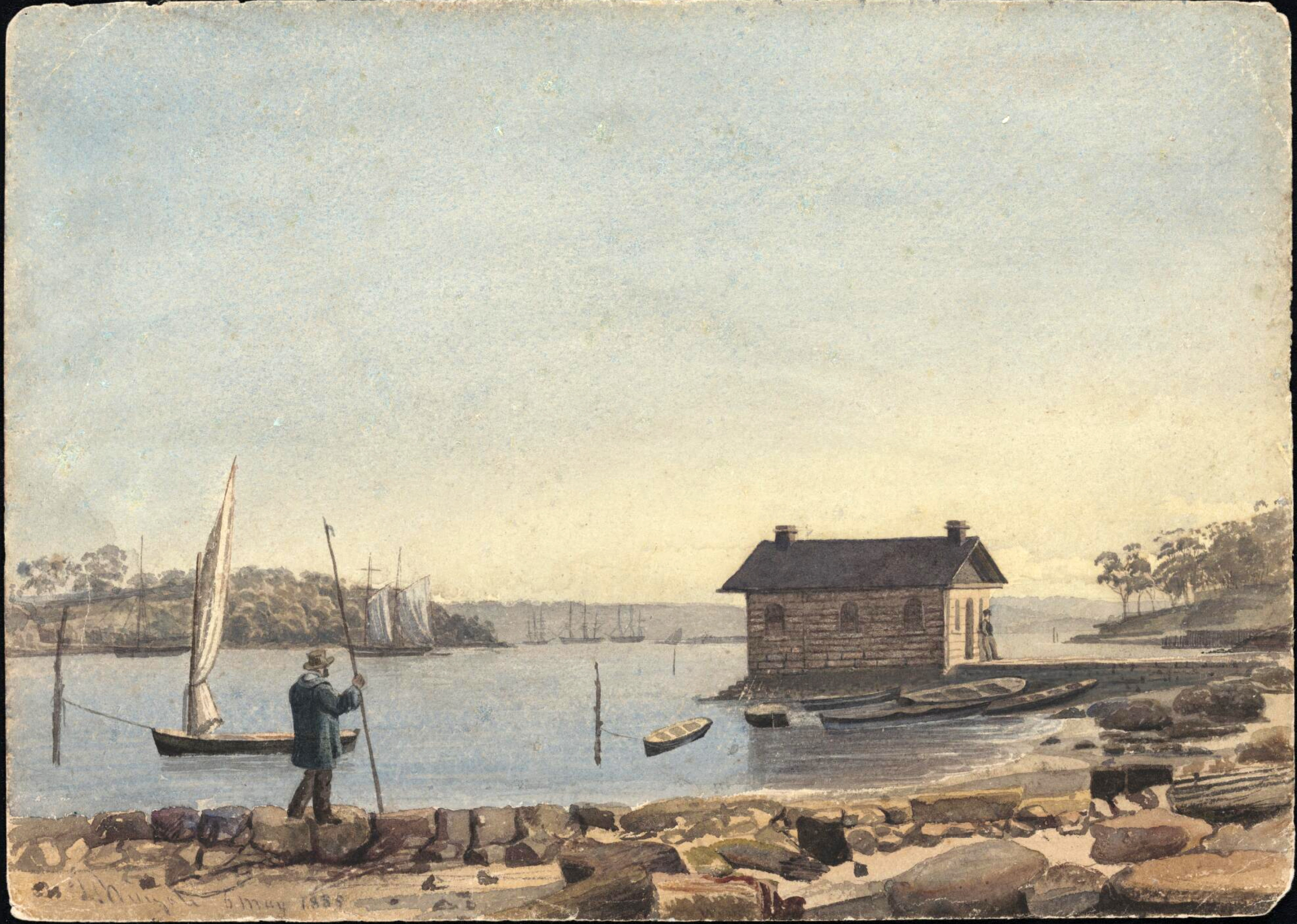
Woolloomooloo Bay in 1855 (watercolour)

The current spelling of "Woolloomooloo" is derived from the name of the first homestead in the area, Wolloomooloo House, built by the first landowner John Palmer. There is debate as to how Palmer came up with the name with different Aboriginal words being suggested. Anthropologist J.D. McCarthy wrote in 'NSW Aboriginal Places Names', in 1946, that Woolloomooloo could be derived from either Wallamullah, meaning 'place of plenty', or Wallabahmullah, meaning 'young black kangaroo'.

In 1852, the traveller Col. G.C. Mundy wrote that the name came from Wala-mala, meaning an "[Aboriginal] burial ground". It has also been suggested that the name means field of blood, due to the alleged Aboriginal tribal fights that took place in the area, or that it is from the pronunciation by Aboriginals of windmill, from the one that existed on Darlinghurst ridge until the 1850s.

=== European settlement ===
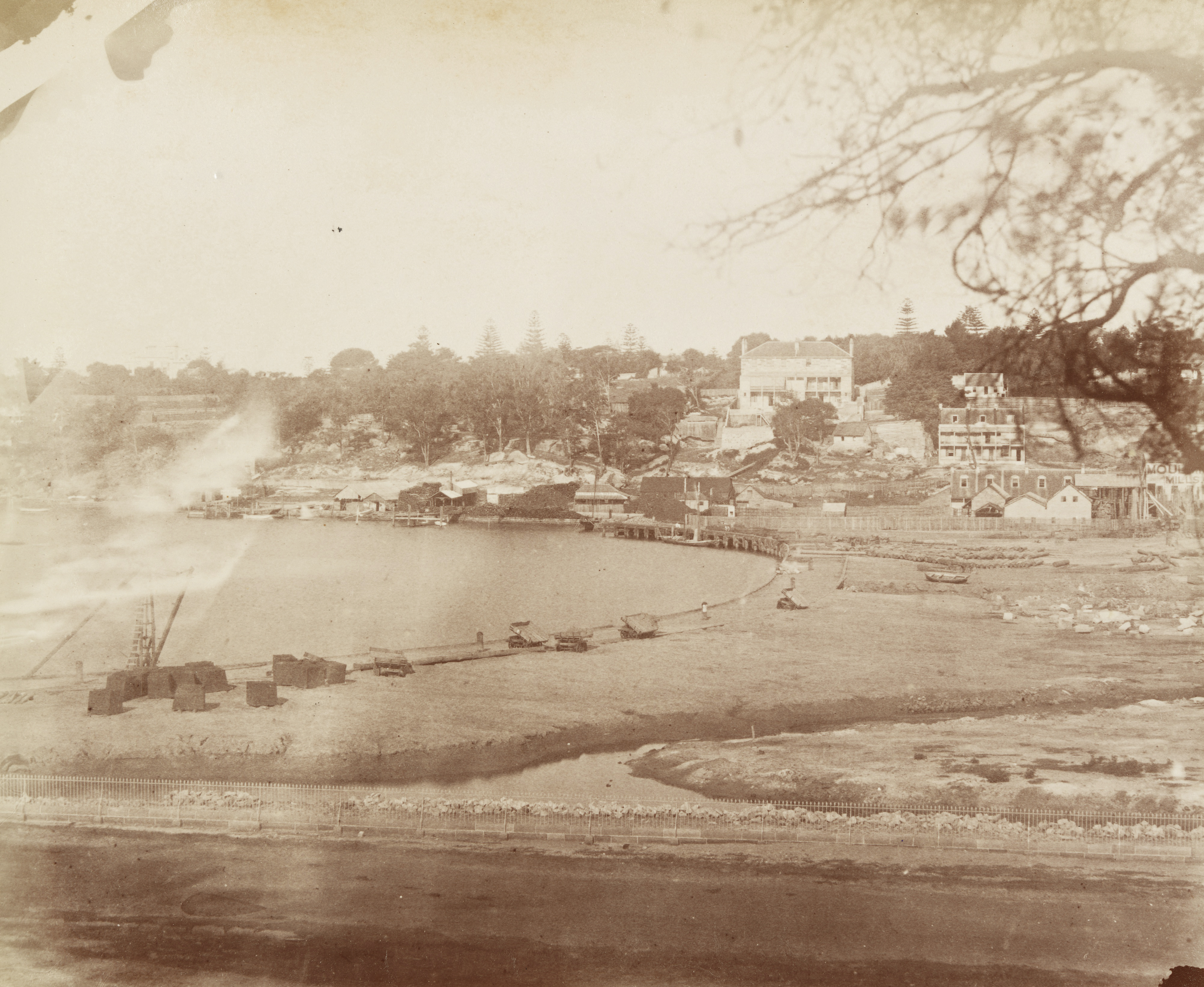
Woolloomooloo Bay, Sydney, 1866

After the First Fleet's arrival in Sydney, the area was initially recognised as Garden Cove or Garden Island Cove after the nearby small wooded Garden Island, off the shore. The first land grant was given to John Palmer in 1793 to allow him to run cattle for the fledgling colony.

An 1832 map by Thomas Mitchell shows "Woolloomooloo Estate" extending from the road "To South Head" northwards to Woolloomooloo Bay. To the east lies a hill with windmills and a "New Prison", and land grants on the peninsula that is now the suburbs of Potts Point and Elizabeth Bay.

In the 1840s, the farm land was subdivided into what is now Woolloomooloo, Darlinghurst and parts of Surry Hills. Originally the area saw affluent residents building grand houses, many with spectacular gardens, attracted by the bay and close proximity to the city and Government House.

The area slowly started to change after expensive houses were built in Elizabeth Bay and further east and a road was needed from Sydney. It was for this reason that William Street was built, dividing the land for the first time.

Woolloomooloo Bay was used extensively as a port. As recently as October 1971, the Maritime Services Board opened a 200-metre berth on the western side of the bay.

=== Trams ===
The Woolloomooloo tram line opened in stages between 1915 and 1918. This line branched off from Park Street and ran north along Haig Avenue, Sir John Young Crescent and Lincoln Crescent to Brown's Wharf at Woolloomooloo. Through service ran from Circular Quay via Elizabeth and Park streets. The line was an early closure, in 1935, being replaced by a bus service from Pyrmont.

=== Green ban ===
In February 1973, the Builders Labourers Federation placed a two-year long green ban on the suburb to stop the destruction of low-income housing and trees. It succeeded and 65% of the houses were placed under rent control.

There were substantial disagreements over the future of housing in Wooloomooloo in the 1970's. On behalf of the Residents of Waterloo (ROW) Resident Action Group around late 1977, Ken Lovett wrote a "long angry submission" opposing commercial development, asking "What makes a commercial interest's statements more credible than a group of residents who live in the area?". Historian Shirley Fitzgerald wrote this posited "a priority of moral rights which, taken to its logical conclusion, would prevent any land-use changes indefinitely. The rich as well as the poor would be lodged forever in whatever residential niche they happened to find themselves at a given time." High rise development was eventually stalled. By October 1979, 68 dwellings were ready for occupation, with the "last" buildings not completed by the time of Fitzgerald's writing in 1991. There were about 800 dwellings in the Wooloomooloo basin by 1991.

== Heritage listings ==
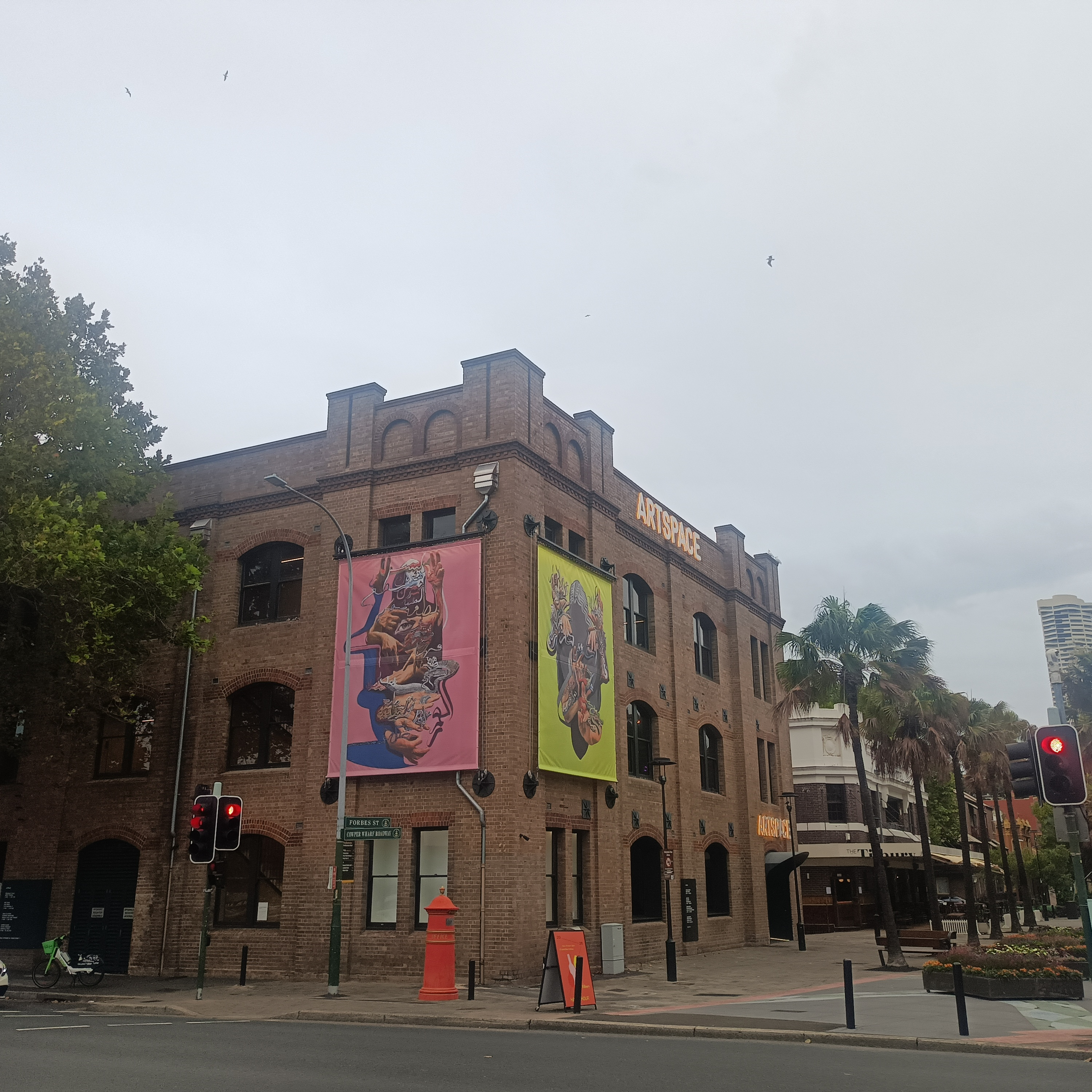
Artspace Visual Arts Centre. 2026

Woolloomooloo has a number of heritage-listed sites, including:

- Cowper Wharf Road: Finger Wharf
- 43–51 Cowper Wharf Road: The Gunnery, Woolloomooloo which is now the site of the Artspace Visual Arts Centre

== Population ==
Historical population
Year	Pop.	±%
2001	3,038	—
2006	3,518	+15.8%
2011	3,716	+5.6%
2016	4,011	+7.9%
2021	3,792	−5.5%

According to the 2021 census, there were 3,792 people in Woolloomooloo. Aboriginal and Torres Strait Islander people made up 3.6% of the population. 51.5% of people were born in Australia; the next most common countries of birth included England 5.4%, New Zealand 3.7%, China (excluding Special Administrative Regions (SARs) and Taiwan) 2.4%, Vietnam 1.6%, and the United States of America 1.5%. 67.1% of people only spoke English at home; other languages spoken at home included Spanish 3.5%, Mandarin 2.5%, French 1.6%, Cantonese 1.5%, and Vietnamese 1.4%. The most common responses for religion included No Religion 46.7%, Catholic 18.8%, Anglican 6.6%, and Buddhism 3.1%; a further 10.5% of respondents for this area elected not to disclose their religion.

== Landmarks ==
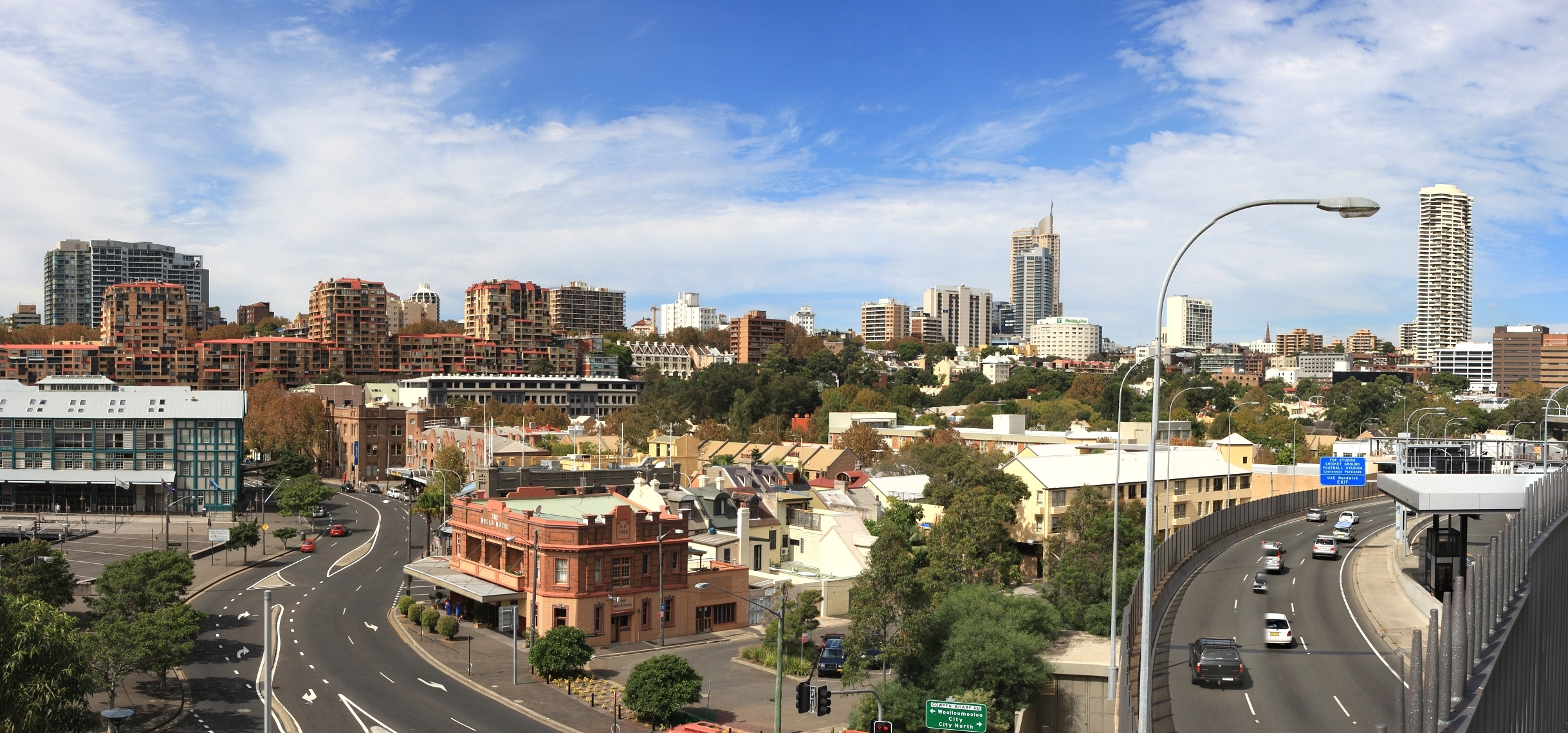
Overlooking Woolloomooloo from the Domain Park, with the Bells Hotel (red brick building) in the foreground

Woolloomooloo is home to the Finger Wharf, known for its remarkable size. It is 400 metres (1,310 ft) long and 63 m (210 ft) wide and stands on 3,600 piles.

The Sydney Harbour Trust built the Finger Wharf, or Woolloomooloo Wharf, between 1911 and 1915 with the charter to bring order to Sydney Harbour's foreshore facilities. The wharf became the largest wooden structure in the world. The area's commerce was dominated by shipping at the wharf and by the regular influx of sailors and officers from the Garden Island base of the Royal Australian Navy.

The wharf's influence diminished for Woolloomooloo during the 1970s when other more modern wharves were preferred. By the 1980s the wharf lay derelict and empty and in 1987, the state government decided to demolish the Wharf. A new complex was approved to replace the wharf in Woolloomooloo Bay, but when demolition work was due to begin in January 1991, locals blocked entrance to the site. Unions imposed a green ban, which stopped demolition crews from undertaking work.

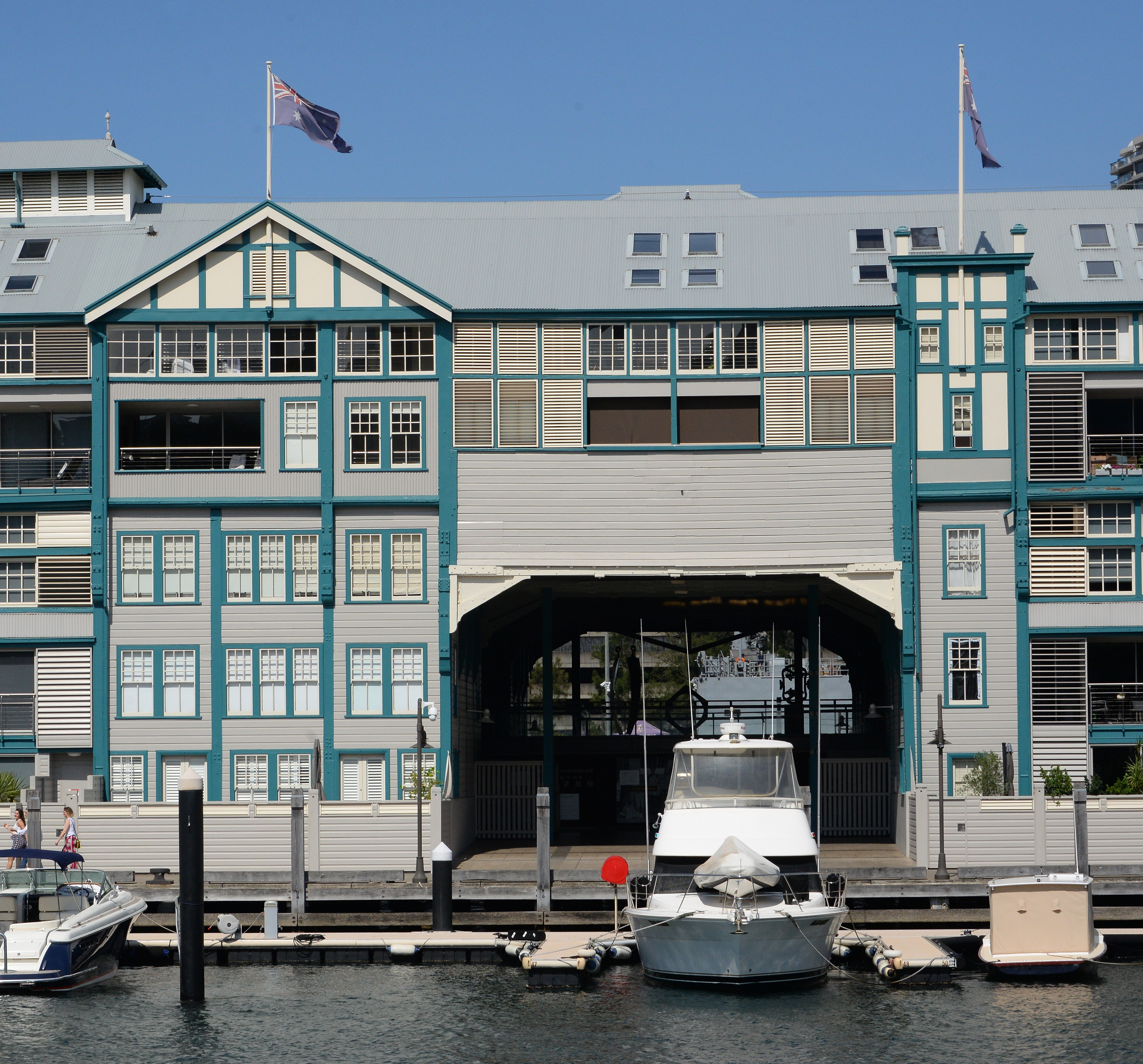
Finger Wharf. 2019

In the mid-1990s the wharf was renovated into 300 private residential apartments and a boutique hotel with 104 guestrooms. It also has several restaurants and bars, including the popular Water Bar, frequented by many visiting celebrities. At first, the hotel was launched as "W Sydney - Woolloomooloo" and was the W Hotels brands' first internationally launched property outside of the United States. The hotel's licensing expired in 2007 and rebranded as "Blue Hotel", managed by Taj Hotels & Resorts. Notable residents include actor Russell Crowe, who lives in a $14 million penthouse which as a result has become famous in Australia and abroad and one of the most expensive and sought after places in the country. Another prominent resident is controversial former Australian radio presenter John Laws.

Woolloomooloo is home to Artspace, an independent, not-for-profit and non-collecting residency-based contemporary art centre. Artspace is housed in the historic Gunnery Building. Devoted to the development of certain new ideas and practices in contemporary art and culture, since the early 1980s Artspace has been building a critical context for Australian and international artists, curators and writers.

The Andrew "Boy" Charlton Pool, sits on the western side of Woolloomooloo Bay, amongst the Royal Botanic Gardens.

== Popular culture ==
- The Bushwackers play a song "Woolloomooloo Lair" about an inhabitant of the suburb.
- Steve Mullins recorded "Woolloomooloo" in 1910 for Jumbo Records in the UK.
- The Tommy Leonetti song "My City of Sydney", later covered by the post-punk band XL Capris, mentions "That little church steeple in Woolloomooloo".
- The Bruces sketch by Monty Python is set in the fictitious University of Woolloomooloo, mainly due to its typical Australian name.
- In the show Flight of the Conchords, Jemaine claims that his short-time girlfriend Keitha ("Unnatural Love") is from Woolloomooloo.
- The 1984 album Zoolook by Jean Michel Jarre has a track titled "Woolloomooloo".
- In 1970, Australian educator, journalist and politician Irina Dunn created the phrase "A woman needs a man like a fish needs a bicycle," scribbling the phrase on two bathroom doors: one at Sydney University where she was then a student, and the other at Soren's Wine Bar in Woolloomooloo. The quip is often incorrectly attributed to American feminist Gloria Steinem.
- The 1982 album Circus Animals by Cold Chisel contains the song "Numbers Fall", which refers to Forbes Street and Springfield Avenue, Woolloomooloo. "Letter to Alan", on the same album, also refers to the Wayside Chapel in neighbouring Potts Point.
- The 1989 album The Big Don't Argue by Weddings Parties Anything contains the song "Ticket in Tatts", which refers to Woollomooloo.
- The popular children's book The Kangaroo from Woolloomooloo (written by Joy Cowley; illustrated by Rodney McRae, 1985), featured, among a wide variety of other Australian fauna, a kangaroo from Woolloomooloo.
- Author/musician and sometime resident Nathan Roche set his novels Vagrer, Cleaning Off The Cobwebs on the Skeletons in the Closet and The Harbour Review in the suburb and also wrote the song "Sailors into Woolloomooloo" which appeared on his 2013 record, Watch It Wharf.
- In the Dutch city of Utrecht, a student's disco is called Her Majesty's first discobar "Woolloomooloo", or "Woo" in brief.
- The song "Slow Motion Angreza" from the Hindi movie Bhaag Milkha Bhaag, featuring Farhan Akhtar and Rebecca Breeds, references Woolloomooloo in its lyrics.
- The infamous brothel owner and underworld figure Tilly Devine was based at Woolloomooloo, and was nicknamed the Queen of Woolloomooloo

== Public transport ==
Woolloomooloo is served by Transdev John Holland bus route 311 from Eddy Avenue to Millers Point.

== Notable residents ==
- Mark Bosnich, former Socceroos football player
- Russell Crowe, actor
- Alessandro Del Piero, former Sydney FC football player
- Tilly Devine, underworld figure
- Delta Goodrem, singer
- Gerard Krefft (1830–1881), zoologist
- John Laws, radio presenter
- Lang Walker, property developer

== Gallery ==
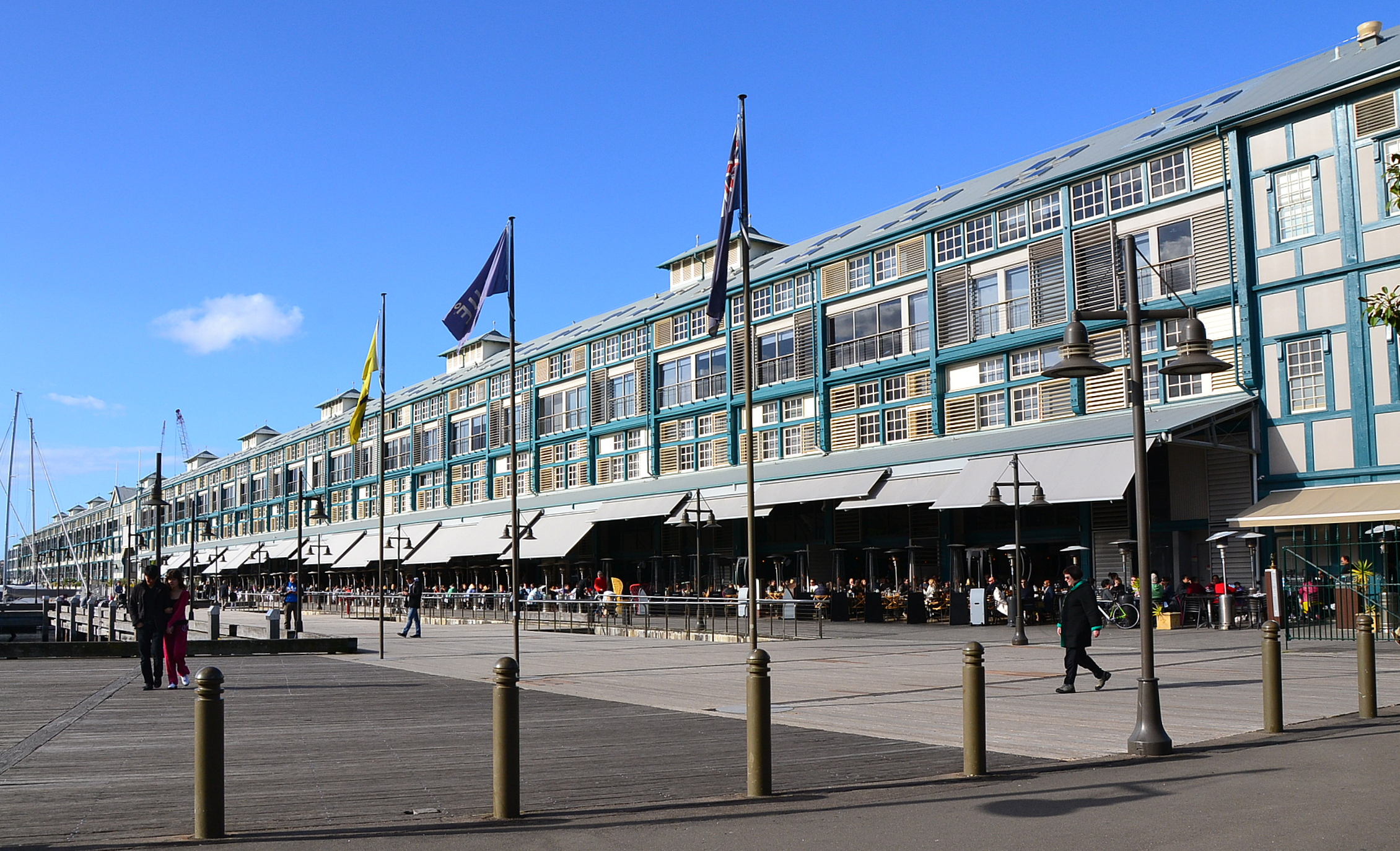
The Finger Wharf. 2014

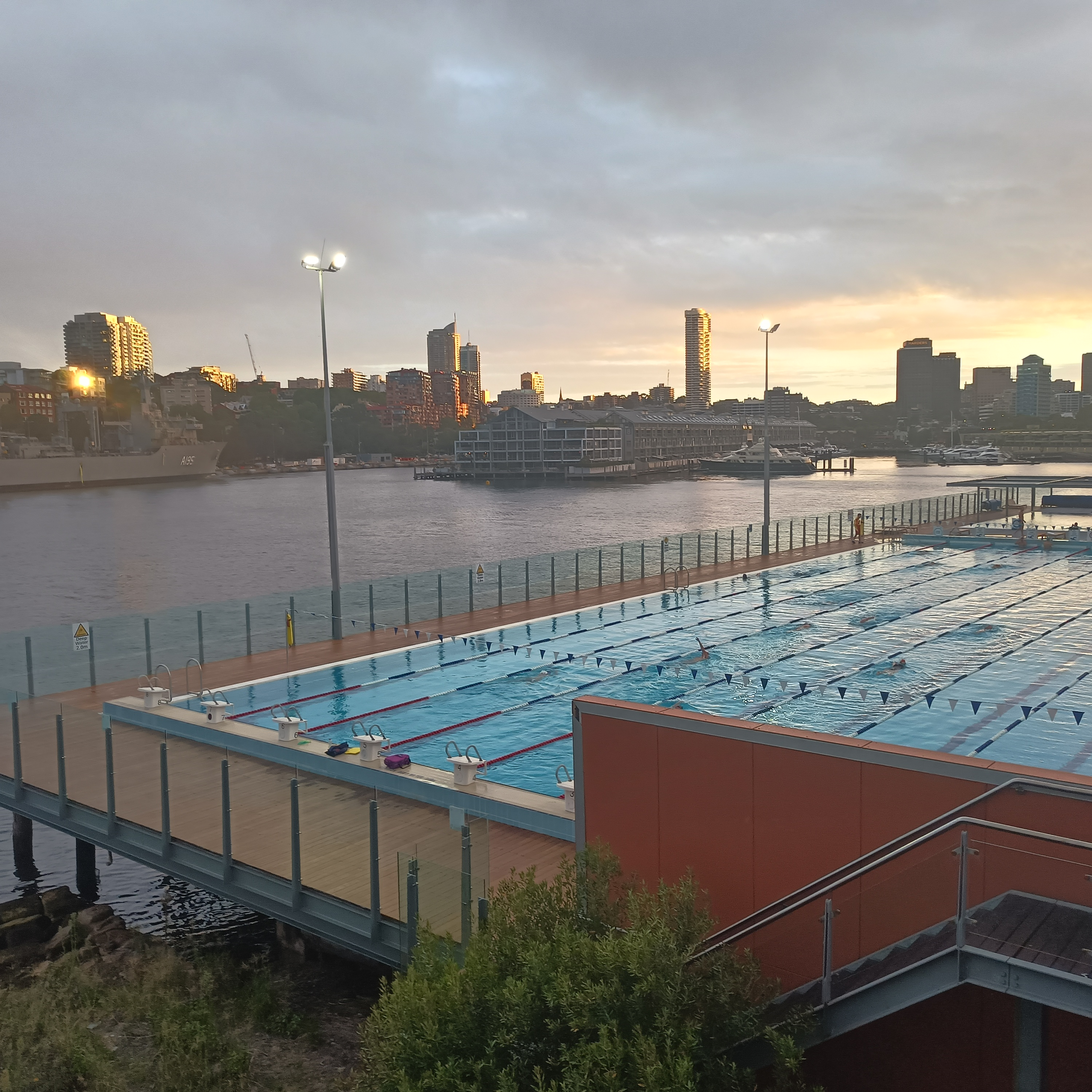
The Finger Wharf in Woolloomooloo Bay. Andrew "Boy" Charlton Pool in the foreground. 2026.

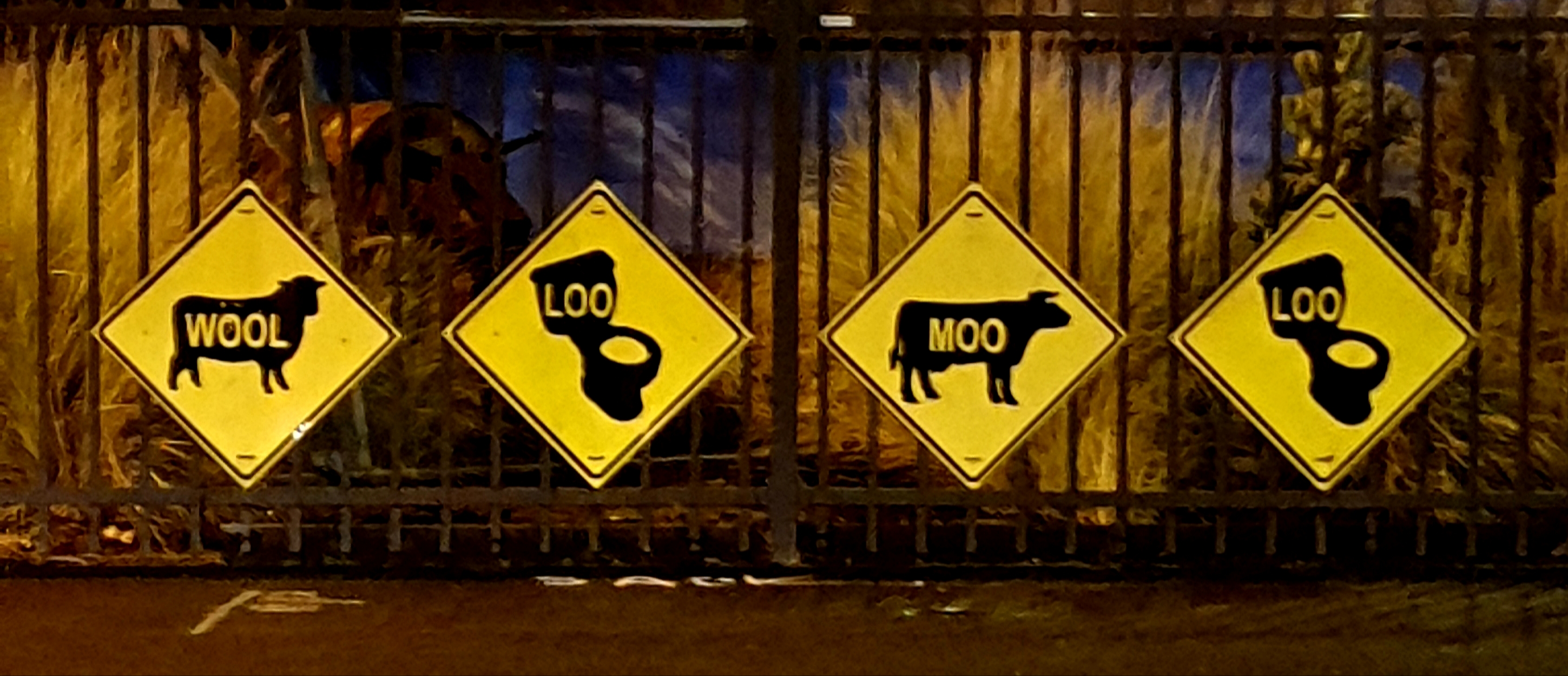
Visual representation of the suburb's name on Cathedral Street. 2019
