= Finger Wharf =

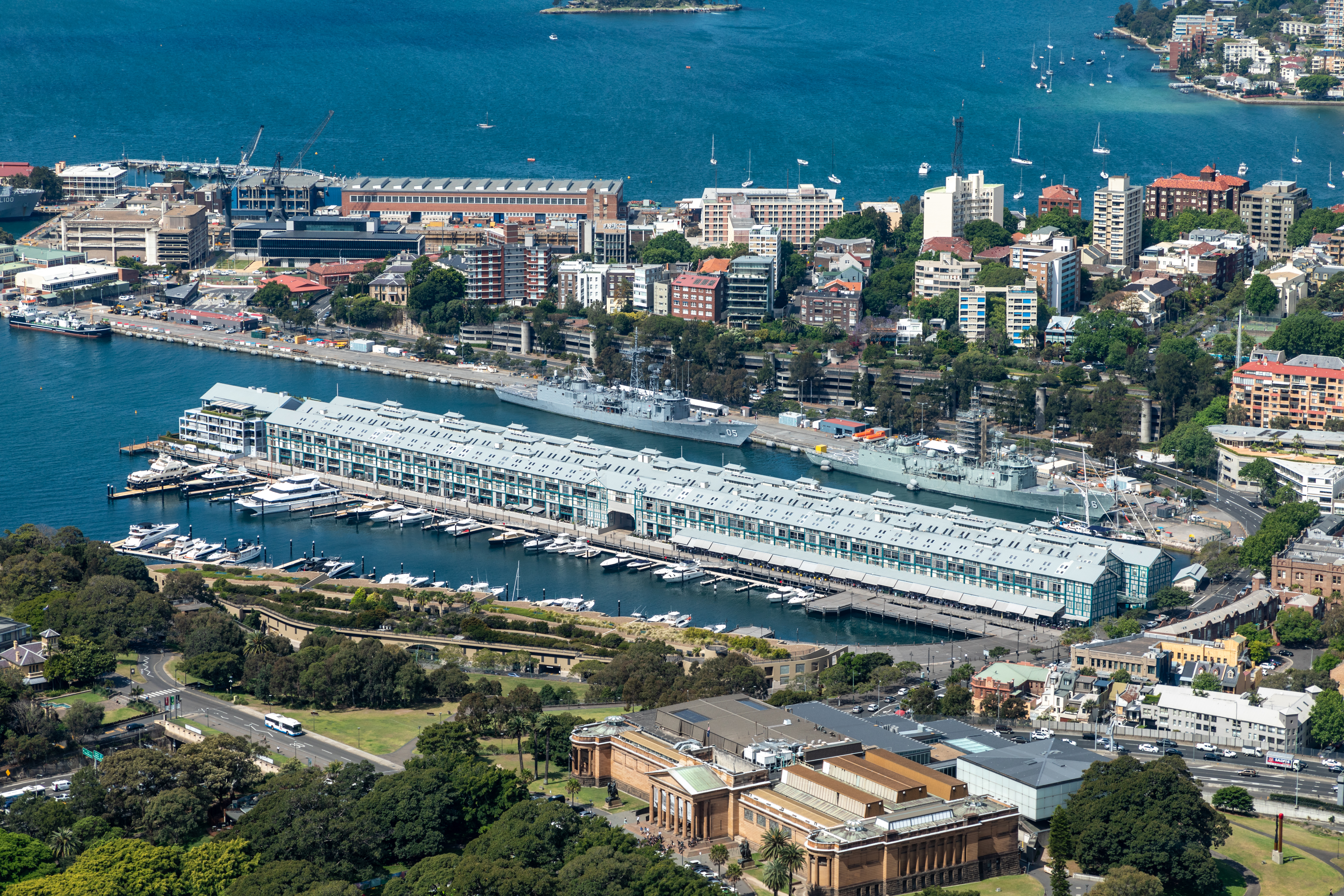
- The Finger Wharf and Woolloomooloo Bay. 2012

- Location of the Finger Wharf relative to the Sydney central business district Finger Wharf (Australia)
- 33°52′03″S 151°13′16″E
- Location: 6 Cowper Wharf Road, Woolloomooloo, Sydney, New South Wales, Australia

History
- Built: 1910–1916

Site notes
- Architect: Henry Walsh
- Owner: Transport for NSW

New South Wales Heritage Register
- Official name: Woolloomooloo Finger Wharf; Woolloomooloo Wharf
- Type: State heritage (built)
- Designated: 18 April 2000
- Reference no.: 1437
- Type: Wharf
- Category: Transport – Water
- Builders: Sydney Harbour Trust

The Finger Wharf is a heritage-listed former wharf and passenger terminal and now marina, residential apartments, hotel and restaurant located at 6 Cowper Wharf Road, in the inner city Sydney suburb of Woolloomooloo, Australia. It was designed by Henry Walsh and built from 1910 to 1915 by the Sydney Harbour Trust. It is also known as Woolloomooloo Finger Wharf and Woolloomooloo Wharf. The property is owned by Transport for NSW. The structure is the longest timbered-piled wharf in the world.

During its working life for around 70 years, it mainly handled the export of wool, but also acted as a staging point for troop deployment to the World Wars as well as a disembarking point for new migrants arriving in Australia. In the 1990s it was redeveloped as a fashionable complex housing a hotel, restaurants and residential apartments.

== History ==
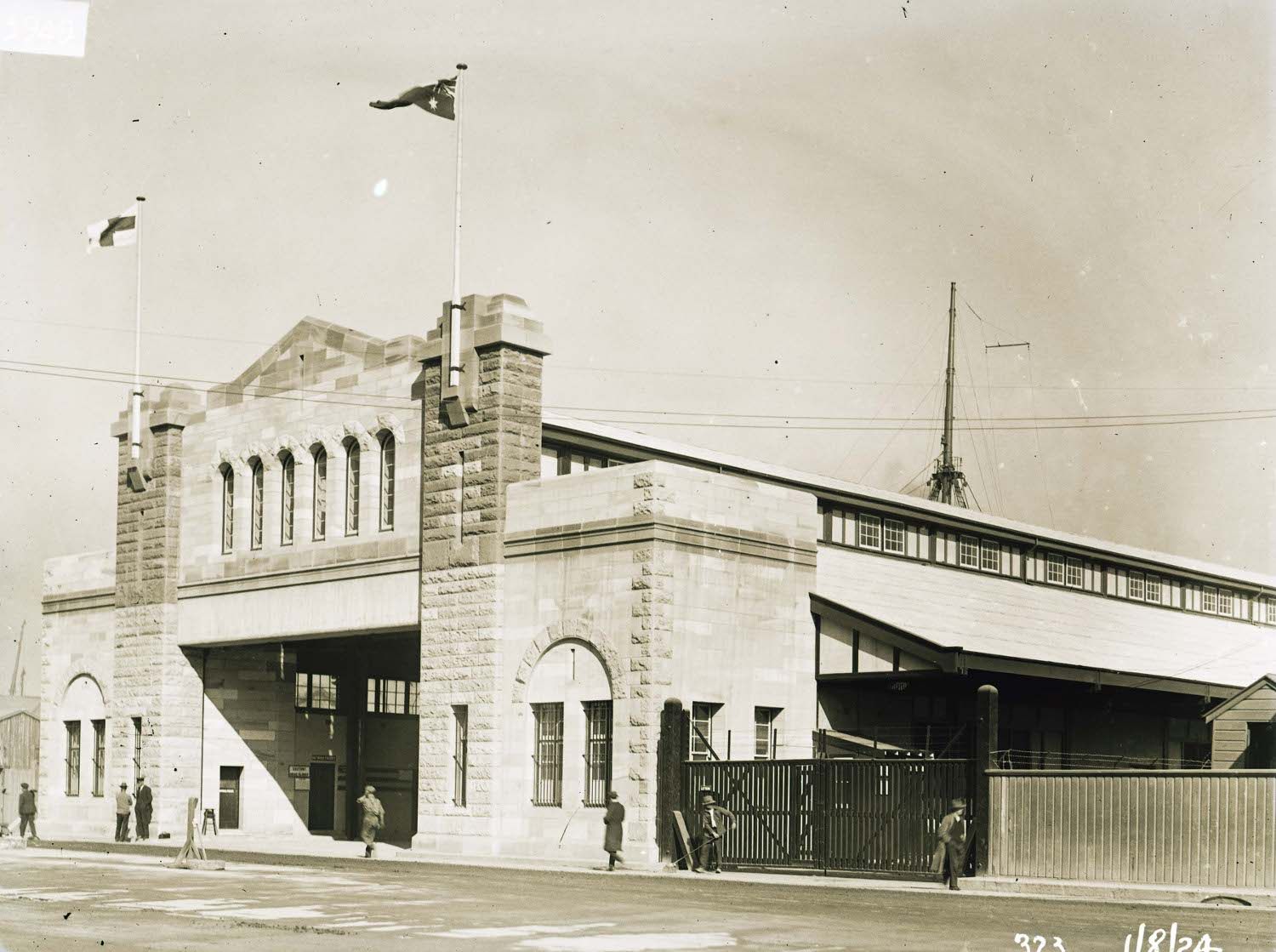
Entrance to the Finger Wharf from Cowper Wharf Road in 1924

The Woolloomooloo Finger Wharf appeared during an era of large finger wharf building. It was built on the site of Sydney's first fish market (1872–1910) for the Sydney Harbour Trust, which was created in 1900 to bring order to the chaotic state of the wharves throughout the harbour and began a substantial rebuilding programme. The jetty was commenced in 1910 and was largely completed by 1913. The trust's engineer-in-chief, Henry Walsh, designed the massive waterfront building.

The Finger Wharf was an operational working wharf for much of the 20th century. Each of the twin storey sheds was associated with a ship's berth and these berths were numbered 6 and 7 (on the east side), and 8 and 9 (on the west side). A 30-metre (98 ft) extension to the wharf was added in 1916. Further development in the form of road building, wharf and pile repair, and shed construction continued up to early 1920s, expanding on the pattern already created. It then became one of the major wool dispatch points, the site of Sydney's only wool dumps (where wool bales are compressed by hydraulic plugs) and the terminal for some of the largest ships entering Sydney Harbour.

In 1926, the northern end shed was constructed to serve as a store and a carpenter's shop. During World War I and World War II, the wharf was an embarkation point for troops boarding converted passenger liners to be transported to foreign theatres of the wars.

The finger wharf was an operational working wharf for much of the twentieth century. For about 70 years it primarily handled the export of wool. It took overseas shipping from Europe and America, as well as from the Pacific. It also acted as a staging point for troop deployment to both World Wars, as well as a disembarkation point for new migrants arriving in Australia. Shed No. 7 was altered in 1956 when it was upgraded to a passenger terminal. This section of the wharf was one of the principal passenger wharves in Sydney and was one of the first contact points for migrants to Australia.

By the 1970s, new container ports with larger wharfing facilities and cruise liner terminals around the city meant the usage of the wharf declined. By the 1980s, the wharf lay derelict and empty and in 1987 the Maritime Services Board and Unsworth Government proposed to demolish the wharf and build a Monte Carlo style marina. In March 1989, the Greiner Government imposed a conservation order. Six months later, the conservation order was to be lifted to save $20 million in maintenance costs with the wharf to be demolished.

A new marina and resort complex was approved to replace the wharf in Woolloomooloo Bay, but when demolition work was due to begin in January 1991, locals blocked entrance to the site. Unions imposed a Green ban which stopped demolition crews from undertaking work.

Due to such a strong public outcry, it was decided that the existing wharf would instead be renovated into a boutique hotel, featuring 104 guestrooms, loft-style suites and private residencies. Walker Corporation and Multiplex undertook the renovation. The hotel features several restaurants and bars, including the popular Water Bar, frequented by many visiting local and international celebrities. The hotel was officially launched as "W Sydney – Woolloomooloo" and it was W Hotels' first property to be launched outside of the United States. The hotel's licensing to Starwood expired in 2007 and re-branded as "Blue Hotel", managed by Taj Hotels. In more recent years the hotel complex has been leased to the Ovolo Hotels.

Notable residents in the apartments include actor Russell Crowe, Lang Walker and John Laws.

== Description ==
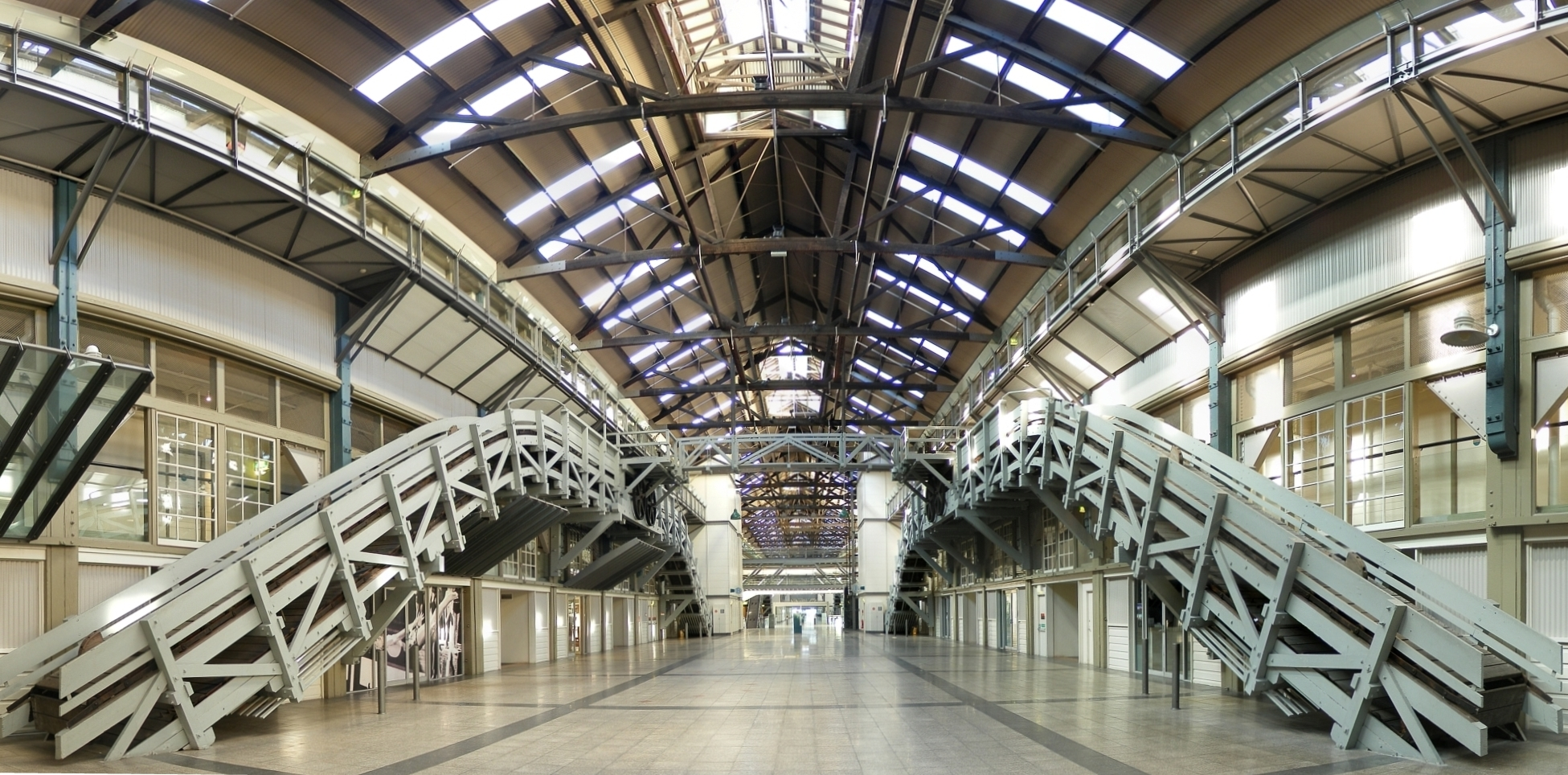
Interior of the Finger Wharf. 2008

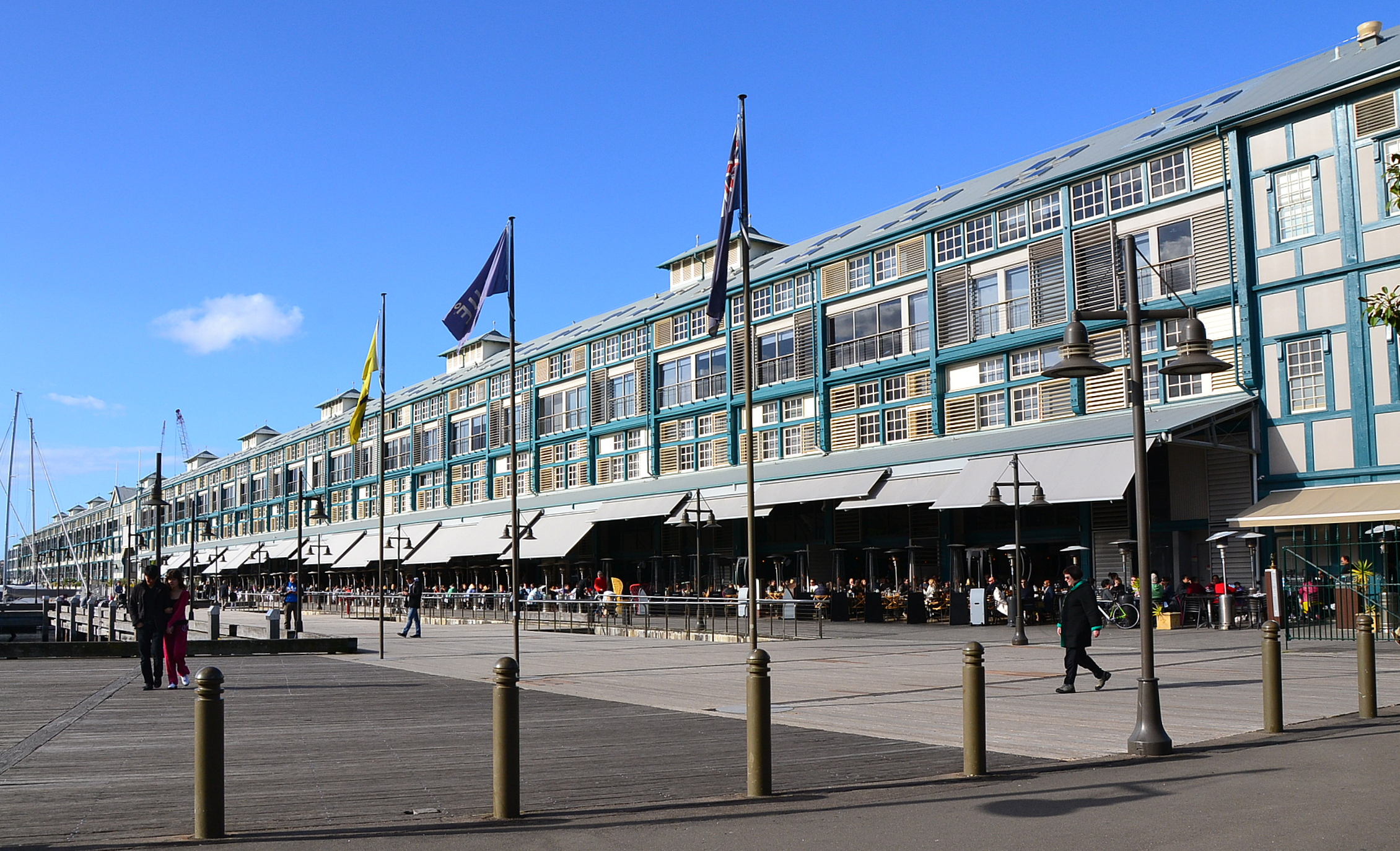
View from Cowper Wharf road. 2014

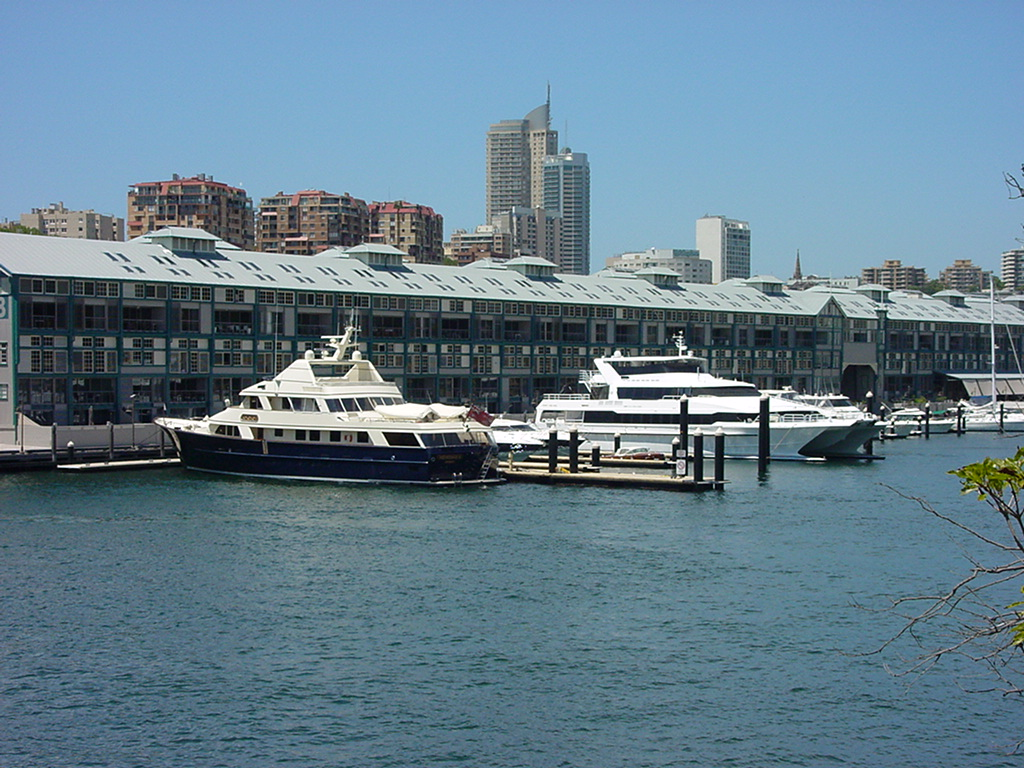
The finger wharf and the marina. 2006

Woolloomooloo Finger Wharf is a turpentine piled wharf 410 metres (1,345 ft) long and 64 m (210 ft) wide (approximately twice as long and ?? times wider than each of the wharves at Walsh Bay). The building on the wharf takes the form of twin storey sheds flanking a central covered roadway. Halfway along its length the building is crossed by an open transept linking the two outer sides of the wharf. The gates, gateposts and spear fence at the entrance to the wharf are possibly the only remains of the nineteenth century Cowper Wharf complex. The building is characterised by the three parallel and immensely long pitched parallel gable roofs of the two sheds and the roadway and by the flat wall surfaces patterned by the repetitive lines of the structural grid and the alternating rhythm of infill panels.

The Port of Sydney took advantage of its small tidal range of only 1.7 metres (6 ft) and its access to the best hard timbers in the world to build enduring timber pile structures with timber warehouses. It is said to be the largest remaining timber pile wharf in the world. It is the only wharf in Sydney with a central roadway on timber piles and is the largest all pile finger wharf ever built in Sydney.

The wharf contains a number of significant items of industrial archaeology. Originally eight electrically driven bale elevators and four electric lifts were provided. Today it contains the only examples in the State of electrically driven goods conveyors running from the central roadway to the upper level, and one of the oldest operating electric lifts in Sydney. At the north end a carpenter's workshop used to exist, and has now been replaced by a concrete and steel apartment building detached from the main wharf building. On the west side is a promenade running the length of the wharf, with a marina on the waterfront and restaurants at the south end. On the east side is a roadway for vehicular access to a carpark for residents.

The Ovolo hotel (formerly the W & the "Blue" hotel) occupies most of the south part of the wharf building, while apartments mainly make up the rest of the structure.

=== Condition ===
As at 4 December 1998, contains sites of archaeological potential. The wharf is undergoing extensive refurbishment for adaptive reuse as hotel and residential accommodation.

=== Modifications and dates ===
- 1924 – wharf extended by 30 metres (98 ft) at northern end
- c. 1943 – berthing fenders constructed
- 1957 – Berth 7 converted to passenger terminal
- 1993 – modernisation of office areas at shoreward end.

== Heritage listing ==
As at 22 March 2001, Woolloomooloo Finger Wharf is of cultural significance for its rarity, scale, construction methods, artefacts of industrial archaeology and diverse history of uses and events. It contains the largest and most distinguished timber wharf building in Sydney Harbour and reflects in its form and contents the history of Woolloomooloo and the principal role of the wool industry in Australia during the nineteenth and early twentieth century.

The Wharf is important as an example of a timber engineering structure on a scale unparalleled in Australia and exceptional in world terms. It also represents the use of Australian timbers in sizes and quantities which would never be matched in the future and in a situation in which their durability and other properties can be assessed. The structure demonstrates engineering and construction processes and the surviving equipment includes the only electrically operated goods conveyors in the State and three of the oldest operating electric lifts in Sydney, which demonstrate the processes of goods handling in the past. It is important for its historic and symbolic associations with Australia's involvement in both World Wars, as the embarkation and disembarkation point for troops, and with immigrants for whom the wharf was their arrival point. The overall scale of the structure, the sizes of the individual components and the quality of construction are in the technical sense outstanding and have impact upon the observer comparable with that of the great monuments of antiquity. The public reaction to proposals for the demolition of the wharf shows that there is an extensive community esteem to these qualities.

Woolloomooloo Finger Wharf was listed on the New South Wales State Heritage Register in April 2000.

Part of the Aboriginal "Eora" territory, which is reflected in the name "Woolloomooloo" reflecting this former Aboriginal occupation of the area. It contains sites of archaeological potential. It is the largest of all finger wharves built in the Port of Sydney and one of the largest in the world in the Edwardian period. Also contains early 20th century pieces of machinery which are possibly of high significance. Contains a significant quantity of Australian hardwood.
