= 4A Centre for Contemporary Asian Art =

Gallery, advocacy body in New South Wales

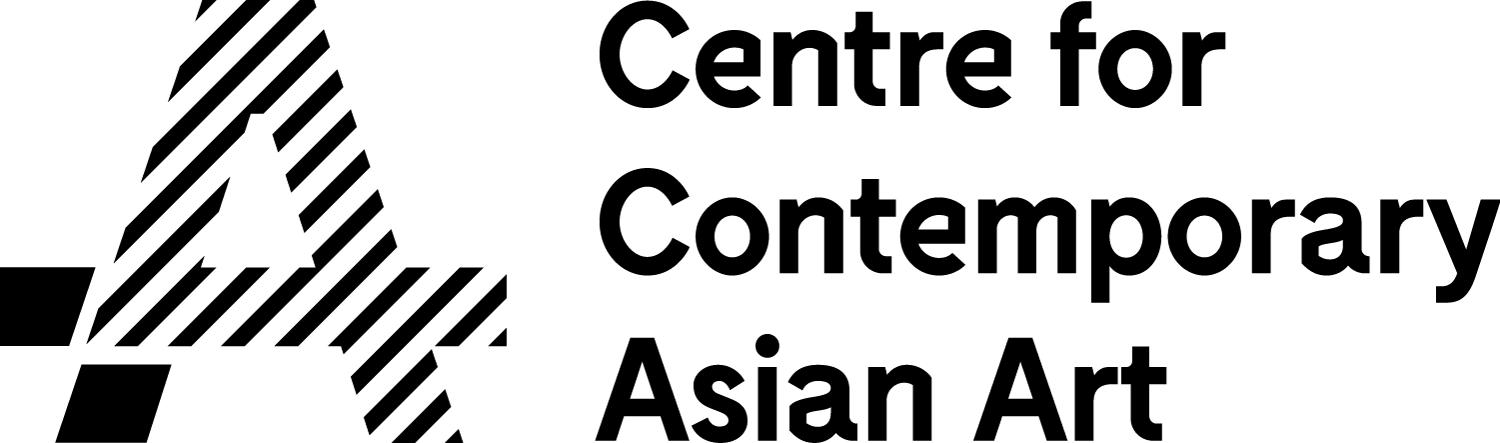

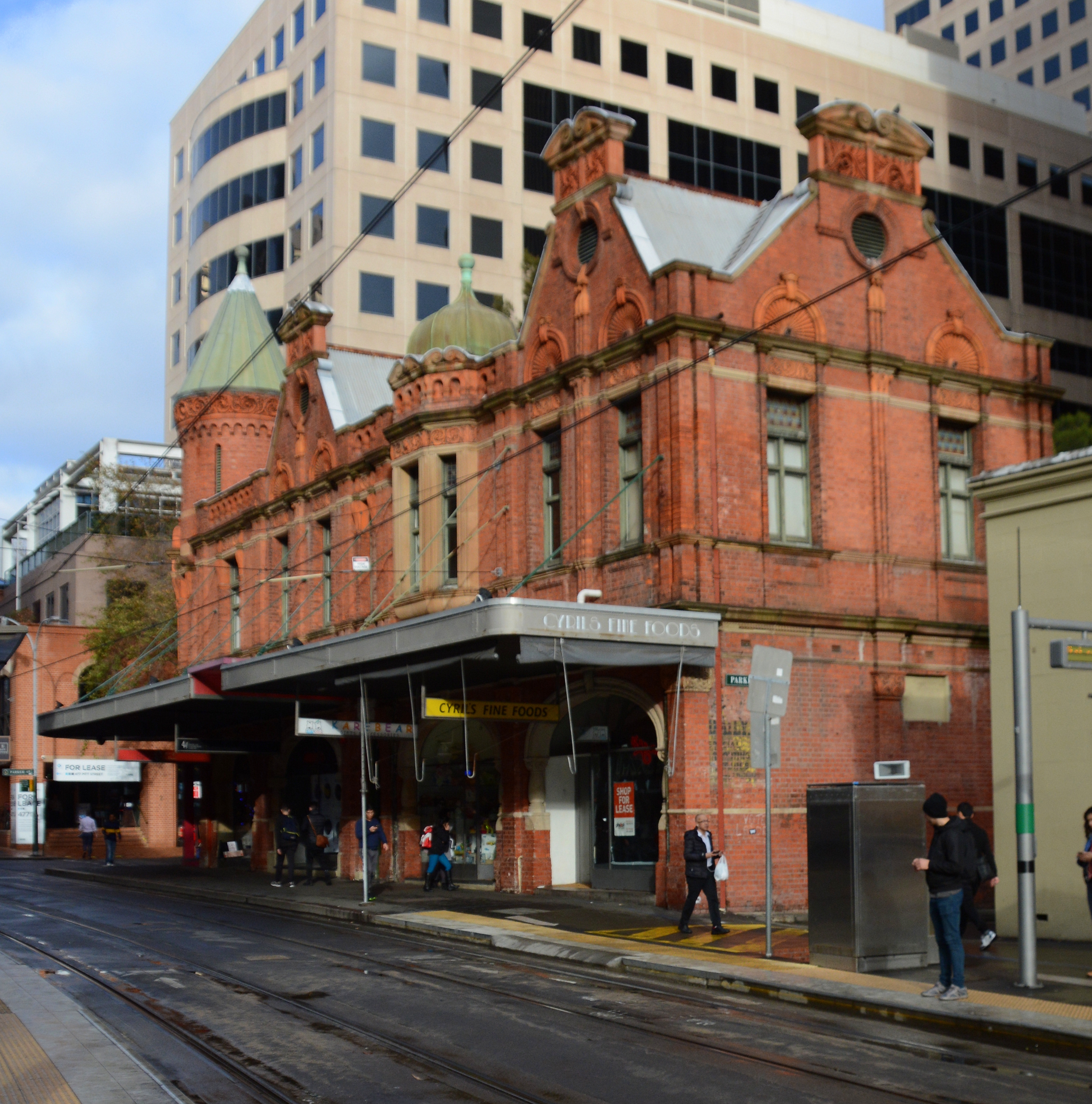

- Location within Sydney
- Former name: 4A Gallery, Asia-Australia Arts Centre
- Established: 1996; 30 years ago
- Location: Haymarket, Sydney, New South Wales
- Coordinates: 33.8800°S 151.2058°E
- Type: Art gallery, advocacy body
- Artistic director and CEO: Thea Baumann
- Chairperson: Julie Ewington
- Website: www.4a.com.au

4A Centre for Contemporary Asian Art, formerly known as Gallery 4A, 4A Galleries, Asia-Australia Arts Centre and also known simply as 4A, is an Australian independent not-for-profit organisation based in the Haymarket area of Sydney, New South Wales. It commissions, exhibits, documents and researches Asian and Asian-Australian contemporary art in Australia, and promotes Australian talent in Asia, promoting and maintaining cultural connections between the nation and the region. The gallery and the associated Performance 4A (for the performing arts) were founded by the Asian Australian Artists Association Inc. in 1997.

The centre is funded mainly by Commonwealth, state and local government sources, but also by private sponsors and organisations, and generates its own income. It has partnered with the Sydney Biennale twice, as well as other organisations such as the Campbelltown Arts Centre to mount major exhibitions and events.

== History ==
4A began in 1995 when a group of artists, curators and theatre-makers started meetings to discuss how to encourage Asian Australian creatives and contribute to the national discourse about Australian culture, and to broaden the understanding of what constitutes Australian art, and bring about structural change. They established the Asian Australian Artists Association Inc. in 1996, to "present and promote the work of Asian and Asian-Australian artists". The association was initially focused on both theatre and visual art. The organisation was then split into Gallery 4A (opened in 1997) and Performance 4A (which later split off and became Contemporary Asian Australian Performance, a resident company at Carriageworks). Founding artists and curators included Filipino-Australian artist Victoria Lobregat, Vietnamese-born Dacchi Dang, Hong Kong-born John Young and Melissa Chiu, who was also the inaugural director.

4A was established at the end of the Keating government, which had established ties with and engaged with Asia. Soon afterwards Pauline Hanson, who questioned the value of multiculturalism in Australia and spouted anti-Asian rhetoric (suggesting that Australia was "in danger of being swamped by Asians"), was emerging in Australian politics, and as such a continuing goal of the organisation has been to "highlight the cultural contribution of Asian migration to Australia and to develop Asian and Australian cultural relations". However, at the same time, the influence of both Indigenous Australian art and that of Australia's migrants was being felt and discussed at conferences, in writing and in artistic circles.

The first gallery, called Gallery 4A, opened on Sussex Street in 1997, in Sydney's Chinatown, before relocating in 1999 to a larger site with two galleries on Liverpool Street and again in the following year to its current location on Hay Street in the heritage-listed Corporation Building, owned by the City of Sydney.

In 2003 and 2004 fundraising exhibitions were mounted at the gallery, which was then known as the Asia-Australia Arts Centre (a name it retained until 2009). At that time public funding accounted for only around 20% of total income.

In 2006, Gallery 4A partnered with the Sydney Biennale for the first time, displaying works at "Gallery 4a at the Asia-Australia Arts Centre" for the 15th edition of the event from June to August.

In 2009 the organisation was renamed 4A Centre for Contemporary Asian Art. There were times during the 2000s and early 2010s when 4A nearly went under owing to lack of funding.

In 2012, director of 4A Aaron Seeto (2008–2015) wrote a submission on behalf of the centre in response to a discussion paper by Arts NSW, regarding an arts and cultural policy for the state, in particular the matter of cultural and linguistic diversity (CALD) in the arts.

In March 2014 Edmund Capon OBE AM was appointed chair of the board, a position he retained until his death in 2019.

In 2018 4A partnered with the Sydney Biennale for the second time.

In April 2021, the Copyright Agency's cultural fund announced the launch of a Copyright Agency Partnerships three-year artistic commission series, in partnership with 4A, the Australian Centre for Contemporary Art in Melbourne, and the Institute of Modern Art in Brisbane. The commissions, worth A$80,000, are designed to support mid-career and established visual artists with a commission as well as a solo exhibition. Western Australian artist TextaQueen was awarded the inaugural commission.

== Description ==
The 4A Centre for Contemporary Asian Art is also referred to as 4A Galleries, or just 4A.

In Australia, 4A encourages a cultural dialogue between Australia and the Asian region, presenting and examining stories and issues pertaining to how the nation engages with Asian culture and nations. It commissions, exhibits, documents and researches contemporary art in Australia, shining a light on Asian-Australian experiences represented in artistic form, as well as how migrants have contributed and changed Australia and continue to do so. In the wider region, promotes Australian talent in Asia, striving to maintain cultural connections between the nation and the region. The centre has also always had a firm focus on Australian artists not of Asian background, and has played a role in the national discussion about what makes up Australian culture.

4A is supported by government, cultural and commercial partners, in order to present exhibitions, performance art, projects and programs relating to artists at all levels of their careers; run residency programs for emerging artists to help develop their careers; consult with the community; and engage in advocacy.

The centre's location in Haymarket is close to the more recently named neighbourhoods, Thai Town (around Campbell Street) and Koreatown (around Pitt and Liverpool Streets). The gallery is as of 2021 being renovated, so all programs, exhibitions and events are presented online. These include 4A Digital, which commissions digital artworks; 4A kids; and the online journal 4A Papers, which was established in 2006 and published biannually until 2020, and from 2021, published concurrently with 4A programs.

== Significance ==
The first two editions of the Asia Pacific Triennial of Contemporary Art in 1996 and 1999 included almost exclusively Asian artists from outside Australia, and Asian Australian artists were largely left out of the concept of "Australian art" during the 1990s. The association realised that there was a long road ahead to bring Asian Australians into Australian art and, more generally, Australian identity.

From the beginning, 4A championed risk-taking and experimental art, and has been a venue for the first group exhibitions for emerging artists as well as for the first solo exhibitions for mid-career artists and a place to push their practice, many of whom have retained connections with the gallery.

Michelle Antoinette wrote in 2014 that 4A had "established an important profile in Australia, but also Asia, as a significant independent art space for the development of contemporary art at the intersection of Asian, Australian and Asian–Australian concerns".

Fiona Kelly McGregor wrote in 2015 that, 20 years after its inception, 4A "remains a vanguard, a much needed touchstone of the land we live on, its regional location and the specifics of art from those places".

In an Australian Centre for Contemporary Art (ACCA) lecture series entitled Defining Moments: Australian Exhibition Histories 1968–1999, taking "a deeper look at the moments that have shaped Australian art since 1968... the game changers in Australian art", former director Mikala Tai was invited to speak on the topic of the founding of Gallery 4A, the inaugural exhibition in 1997, and the impact it has had on contemporary art discourse.

== Governance and funding ==
The 4A Centre for Contemporary Asian Art is a registered charity. 4A Gallery developed philanthropic interests through its earliest exhibitions, and fund-raising has always been a key part of the gallery's activities. Early events attracted luminaries of the Australian art scene. Today it is funded by a variety of sources, including the Commonwealth Government via the Australia Council for the Arts and Visual Art & Craft Strategy; the New South Wales Government through Arts NSW; the City of Sydney; Art Monthly Australasia; many individuals and various organisations and charitable foundations. It reported income of A$790,232 in the 2020–21 financial year, of which 78% came from government grants and 12% self-generated.

The Centre is run by a board of 11 people as of January 2022, chaired by Julie Ewington, specialist in contemporary Australian art and founder member of the Women's Art Movement in Adelaide in 1976.

Amrit Gill, former Director of International Development at the Australia Council for the Arts, has been Artistic Director and CEO of 4A since February 2021, in a role expanded from that of simply Director. The role of Director had been previously held by Mikala Tai for five years, before she was appointed Head of Visual Arts at the Australia Council.

4A is a member of the advocacy organisation Contemporary Art Organisations Australia.

== Notable exhibitions ==
Gallery 4A's inaugural exhibition, titled simply Inaugural Exhibition, in 1997, curated by 4A's first curator and director Melissa Chiu, featured three Asian-Australian artists: Emil Goh, Lindy Lee and Hou Leong. This exhibition in the first tiny gallery set the tone and foundational aims for the aims of Gallery 4A.

Edge of Elsewhere was a three-year collaboration with the Campbelltown Arts Centre which commissioned artists from Australia, Asia and the Pacific region to create new works, produced for the Sydney Festival from 2010 to 2012.

From February to May 2015 the major project Mass Group Incident, curated by 4A, was presented in Sydney. The project comprised a series of three components: the first by the Chinese art collective the Yangjiang Group ("Actions for Tomorrow"); the second by nine diverse artists ("Tell Me My Truth"); and the last a program presented over two days, of live performance and other art ("48HR Incident"). The five-month project was put on at 4A's galleries and several off-site locations, and also included site-specific projects and film screenings, supported with Commonwealth Government funding by the Australia Council for the Arts and the Australia–China Council of the Department of Foreign Affairs and Trade, as well as the City of Sydney and the Chinese Garden of Friendship at Darling Harbour.

4A Centre was a partner of the 21st Sydney Biennale in 2018, exhibiting the work of Chinese-Austrian artist Jun Yang and Japanese film artist Akira Takayama.

In April/May 2019, an exhibition titled By All Estimates featured the work of three Singaporean artists: the London-based Erika Tan, Sydney-based Jessica Bradford, and Singapore-based Moses Tan, as well as Indian multimedia artist Rathin Barman, who is based in Kolkata.

In 2021, an exhibition entitled I am a heart beating in the world: Diaspora Pavilion 2 was presented by the Campbelltown Arts Centre in collaboration with 4A and the International Curators Forum (ICF), featuring the work of six artists, including Australians Abdul-Rahman Abdullah and Lindy Lee. The first of a series of ICF's Diaspora Pavilion events run in collaboration with 4A, it afterwards moves to London and Venice for the second edition.

== Publications ==
4A is also a publisher of exhibition catalogues and other monographs.

== Notable people ==
- Laurens Tan, board member from 1998 to 2008
