= Urban Art Projects =

Australian art fabricator

- Formation: 1993
- Founder: Matthew Tobin and Daniel Tobin
- Founded at: Brisbane
- Legal status: Privately owned company
- Locations: Brisbane; Shanghai, New York
- Staff: 300
- Website: uapcompany.com
- Formerly called: Urban Artists

Urban Art Projects (UAP) is an Australian company that works with artists, architects, designers, developers, curators, institutions and art commissioners to realize public art and architectural design elements.

== History ==
The company was founded in 1993 in Brisbane, Australia by brothers Matthew and Daniel Tobin. Its initial name was Urban Artists. The Tobin brothers first purchased a small welding and metal fabrication company that worked on marine and construction projects. Over time, they invested the profits of this first company into the construction of a foundry that could be used for art projects. One of UAP's first clients was the Australian Waanyi multi-media artist Judy Watson.

The company has its main office and studios in Brisbane, and a satellite studio in Shanghai. In 2019, UAP acquired New York-based foundry, Polich Tallix. The same year, UAP began using a large industrial robot for selected projects at its Brisbane studio.

== Notable projects ==
- Hank Willis Thomas' oversized arm sculpture Unity at the foot of the Brooklyn Bridge, cast at UAP's Polich Tallix foundry.
- Tow Row, a bronze fishing net sculpture in front of the Queensland Gallery of Modern Art by Judy Watson.
- Gilded Cage and Arch, part of Ai Weiwei's 2017 project Good Fences make Good Neighbors.
- Wahat Al Karama, a 2018 memorial to fallen Emirati soldiers by Idris Khan.
- Kraken a giant 2017 octopus sculpture for a Shanghai playground. By Florentijn Hofman.
- Messengers of Brisbane, a series of oversized finch sculptures installed around Brisbane. By the artist Florentijn Hofman.
- NOW, a sculpture installed on the rooftop Courthouse of the Appellate Division, First Department of the Supreme Court of the State of New York. By the artist Shahzia Sikander.
- City of Parramatta public art sculptures for artists Reko Rennie and Claire Healy and Sean Cordeiro.
- Lindy Lee's Ouroboros an immersive public art commission for the National Gallery of Australia
- George Stanley's Oscar Statuettes
