= Laurens Tan =

Dutch-born Australian artist and designer

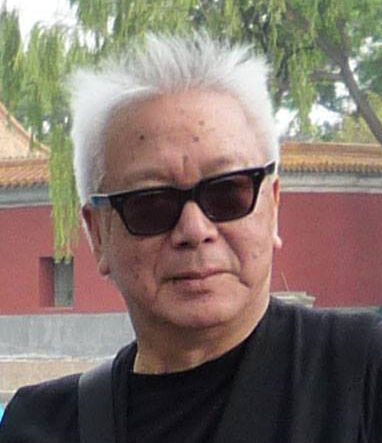
- Tan in 2017
- Born: 7 August 1950; Den Haag, Netherlands
- Died: 20 January 2025 (aged 74); Las Vegas, United States
- Education: University of Technology Sydney; New South Wales Conservatorium of Music
- Known for: Sculpture, 3D Design, 3D Animation
- Awards: 1980 – Whyalla Art Prize, SA; 2005 – Fisher's Ghost Open Art Prize, NSW; 2011 – Commissioned Feature Artist, Art Asia Miami, Art Basel, FL; 2014 – Commissioned Artist, Empire Bookends, University of Chicago, Beijing, CN; 2019 – Commissioned Artist, CNY Lantern Project, City of Sydney, NSW

Laurens Tan (7 August 1950 – 20 January 2025) was a multidisciplinary Australian artist. His work includes sculpture, 3D animation, video, and graphics, and is influenced by architectural and industrial design. He lived and worked in Sydney, Beijing, and Las Vegas.

His work has been exhibited at the Institute of Contemporary Art, Boston, Museum of Fine Arts, Houston, Art Gallery of New South Wales, and the Sydney Powerhouse Museum.

== Education and career ==
Tan completed his Doctor of Creative Arts (DCA) thesis "The Architecture of Risk" at University of Technology Sydney, following his academic career as cultural studies educator at the School of Creative Arts at the University of Wollongong (1987-1991). He was an adjunct professor at Tianjin Academy of Fine Arts (2006-) and La Trobe University (2011-) and taught at other undergraduate and graduate arts programs in the United States, Australia, and China.

Tan served as a board member of the Asian Australian Art Association (which runs the 4A Centre for Contemporary Asian Art) in Sydney from 1998 to 2008, and as Artist Advisory Group Member at the Museum of Contemporary Art in Sydney from 2004 to 2006.

== Work ==
His work is informed by Chinese heritage, language and meaning. Since his early Beijing series of work, he utilises the form of the sanlunche (Chinese tricycle) to convey the complexity of change in China under economic and cultural transformation.

Tan's earlier works from 1990 to 1999 include Re-sited References (Retrospective) at the Queensland University Art Museum (1990), Adapt Enforce V at the Perth Institute of Contemporary Arts (1992), Games & Voices at Macquarie Galleries (1992), Gallery 14 Contemporary Artists Series at the Queensland Art Gallery (1993), Profile of a Counter at Banff Centre in Alberta, Canada (1998), IndyCar Slot at Gold Coast Arts Centre (1998), and Octomat at World Gaming Expo & Congress in Las Vegas. He was also part of the international touring exhibition “Elvis + Marilyn: 2 x Immortal” that was shown in the Contemporary Arts Museum Houston and eleven other American museums (1995).

As a Las Vegas resident, his art was often inspired by the unique visual culture of the city. His work in the United States includes Babalogic in the Desert at the Sahara West Library in Las Vegas, shown from 2017 to 2018.

In 2008, he was commissioned to create "Babalogic" for the survey exhibition 2D/3D Negotiating Visual Languages, curated by Wu Hung at the PKM Gallery in Beijing. He was included in two following exhibitions in Beijing curated by Dong Bingfeng: Asian Landmark at the Iberia Center of Contemporary Art (2010), and “Fat Art 2” at the Today Art Museum (2010). Other key Beijing exhibitions include ShiWaiTaoYuan, a public art commission at The Opposite House in Beijing (2012). This work continues his synthesis of heritage in contemporary as well as Tan's signature tricycles, alluding to the rapid modernization in contemporary Chinese culture.

Tan's work has been curated at various contemporary museums and galleries Asia, such as the Kuandu University Art Museum, Taipei Taiwan (2011), PKM Gallery in Beijing (2008), Shizuoka Prefectural Art Museum in Japan, and Seoul National University Museum of Art and Gana Galleries in Seoul

He was co-curator for the show Always on My Mind: Home at the Seoul National University Museum of Art (2011).

Tan was commissioned by the City of Sydney to build three giant “See No Evil, Hear No Evil, Speak No Evil” monkeys at the Sydney Opera House in celebration of the Lunar New Year. This particular work was in installation from 2016 to 2018. His piece Speed/Sudu was commissioned for the Murray Art Museum Albury (MAMA) in 2016.

In 2014, he was commissioned by the University of Chicago to create Empire Bookends: Basketcase, a solo exhibition in the university's Beijing Center.

In 2016, he was commissioned to create Depth of Ease CNY, a solo exhibit of three separate works, for Zappos Downtown in Las Vegas.

In 2017, he was named Visiting Artist at the Neon Museum in Las Vegas.

Tan died in Las Vegas on 20 January 2025.

== Collections ==
His artwork was acquired by the Marjorie Barrick Museum at the University of Nevada, Las Vegas in 2018, and Deakin University in Melbourne in 2018. His work is also included in the collections of Queensland Art Gallery, Art Gallery of Western Australia, Artbank and Wollongong Art Gallery.

== Gallery ==
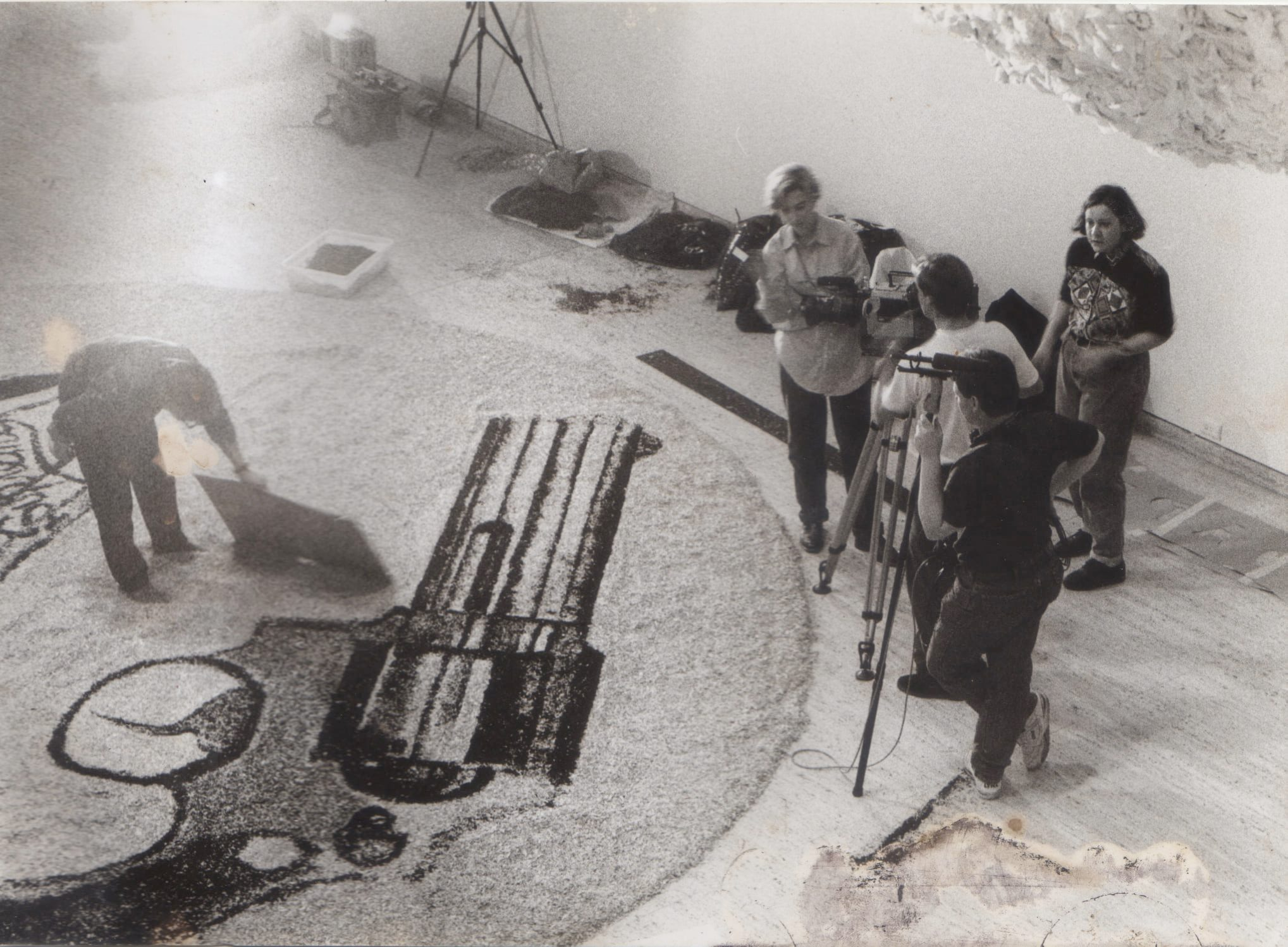
Adapt Enforce, 1991, Laurens Tan, Art Gallery of NSW, Sydney NSW.

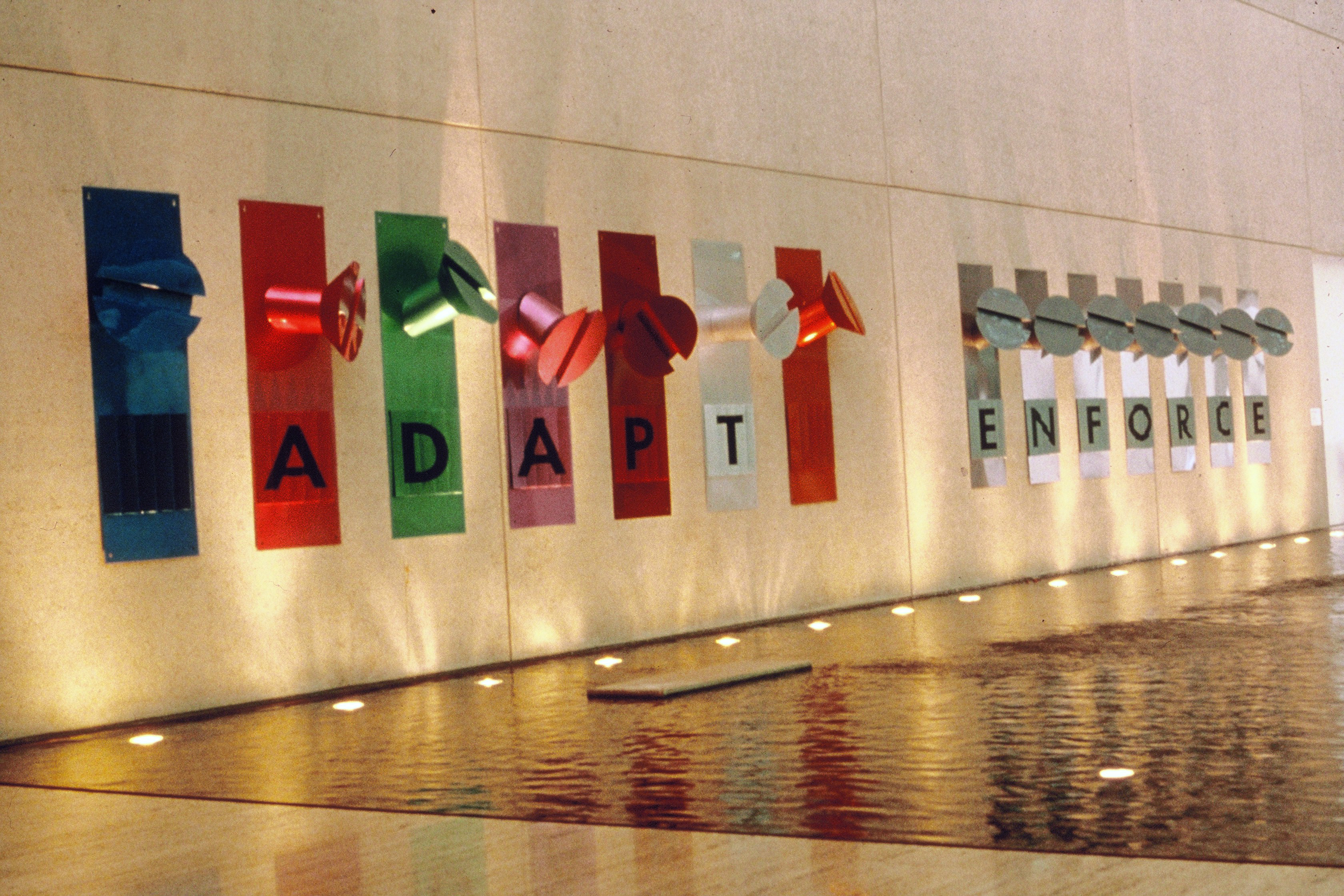
Adapt Enforce II, 1992, Laurens Tan, Queensland Art Gallery, Brisbane QLD.

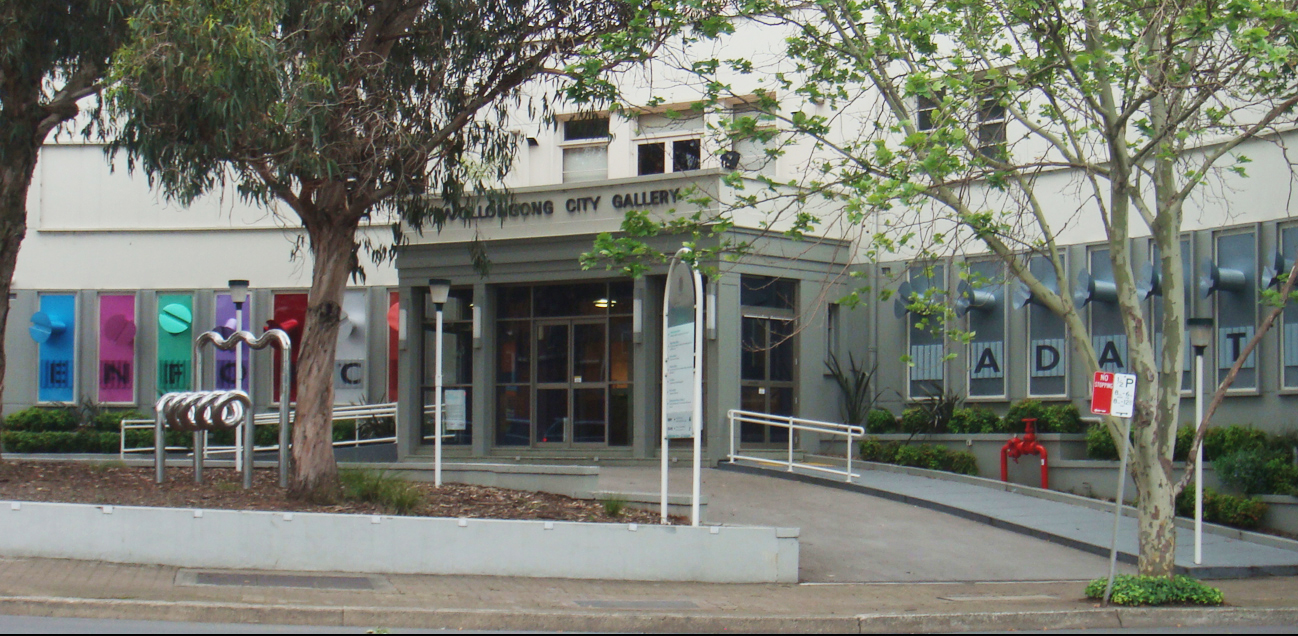
Adapt Enforce II, 1992, Laurens Tan, Wollongong Art Gallery, Wollongong NSW.

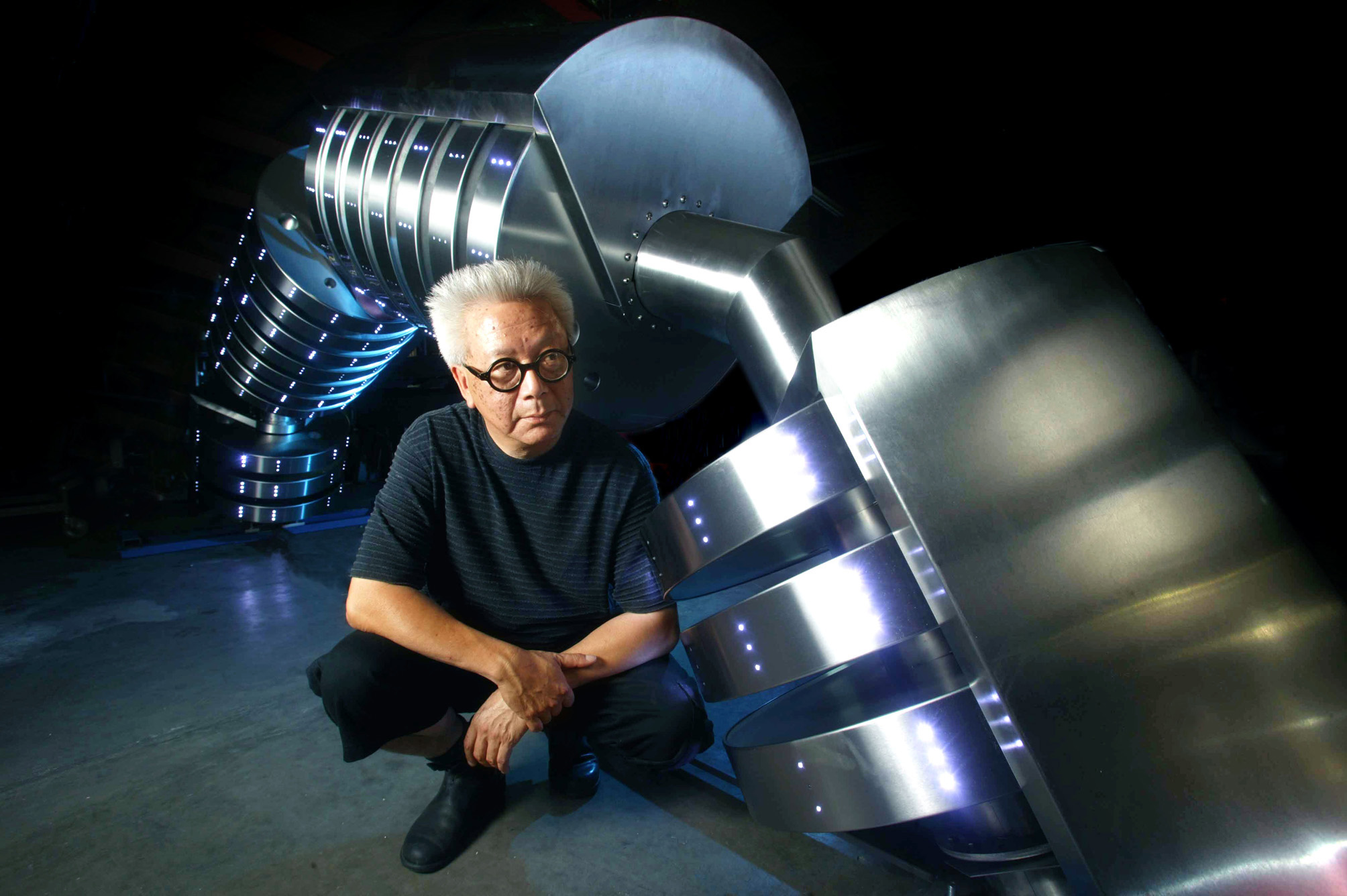
As Weeks Go By, 2005, Laurens Tan, Deakin University, Burwood, VIC.

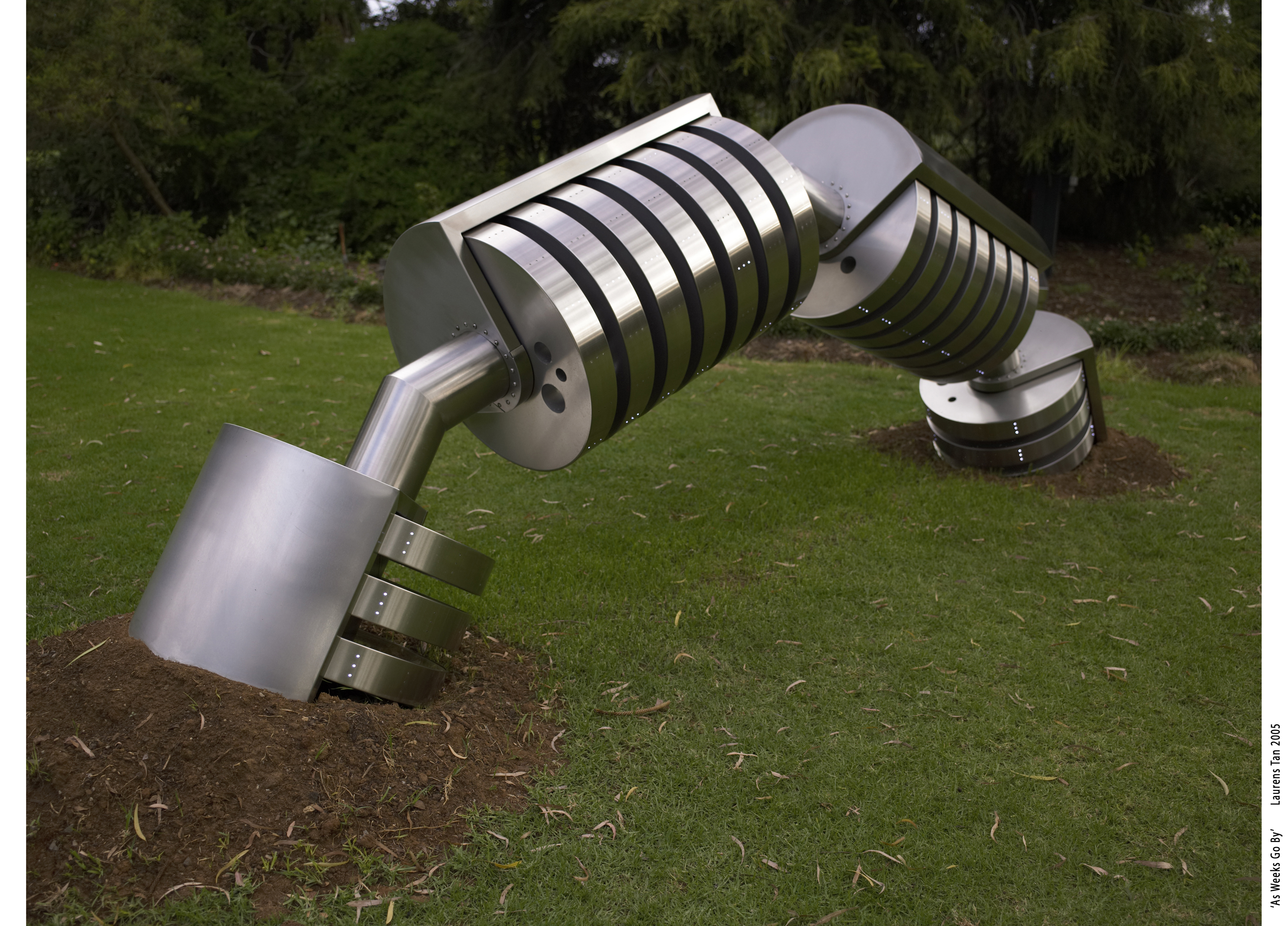
As Weeks Go By, 2005, Laurens Tan, Deakin University, Burwood, VIC.

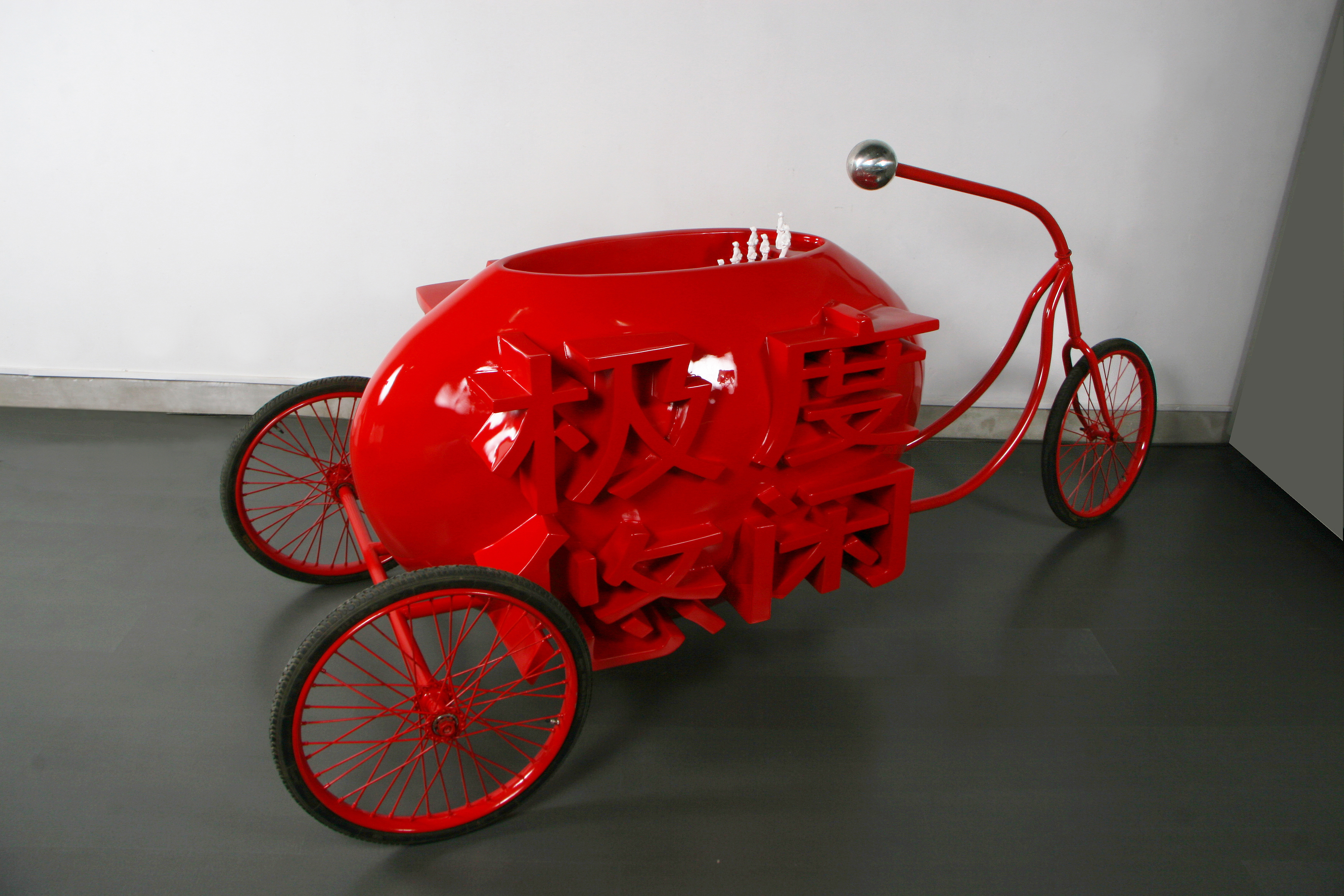
Dan Sheng (Birth), 2007, Laurens Tan, Las Vegas City Hall, NV.

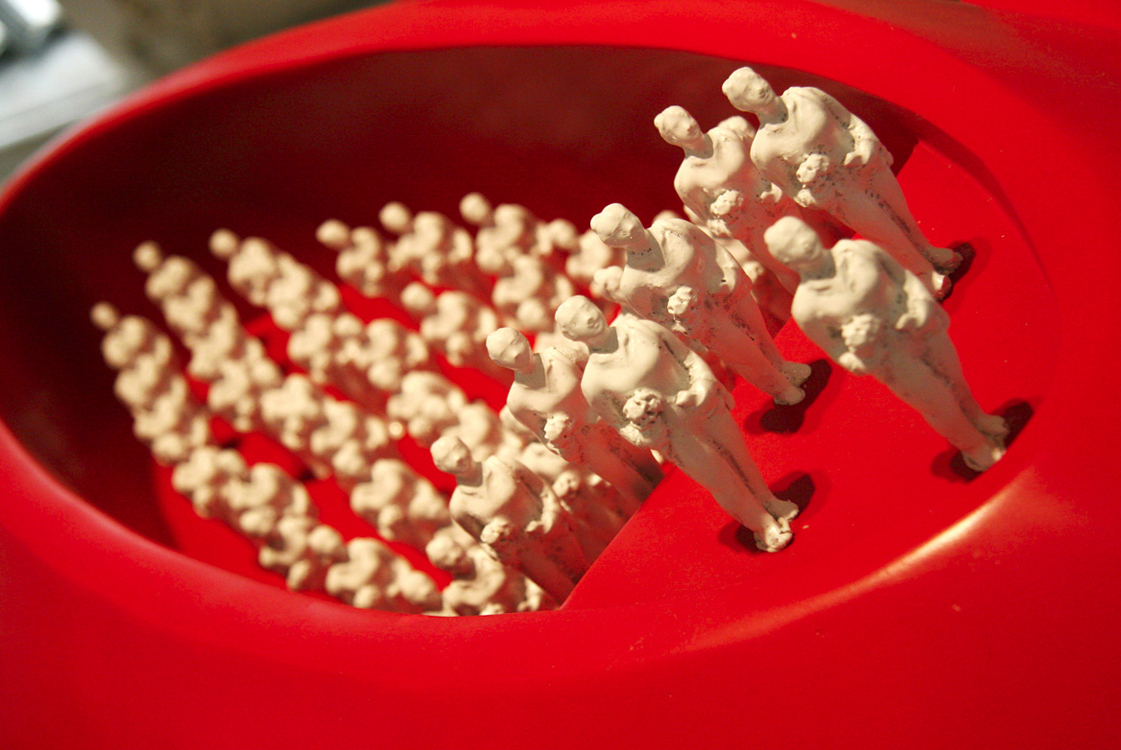
Dan Sheng (Birth), 2007, Laurens Tan, Las Vegas City Hall, NV.

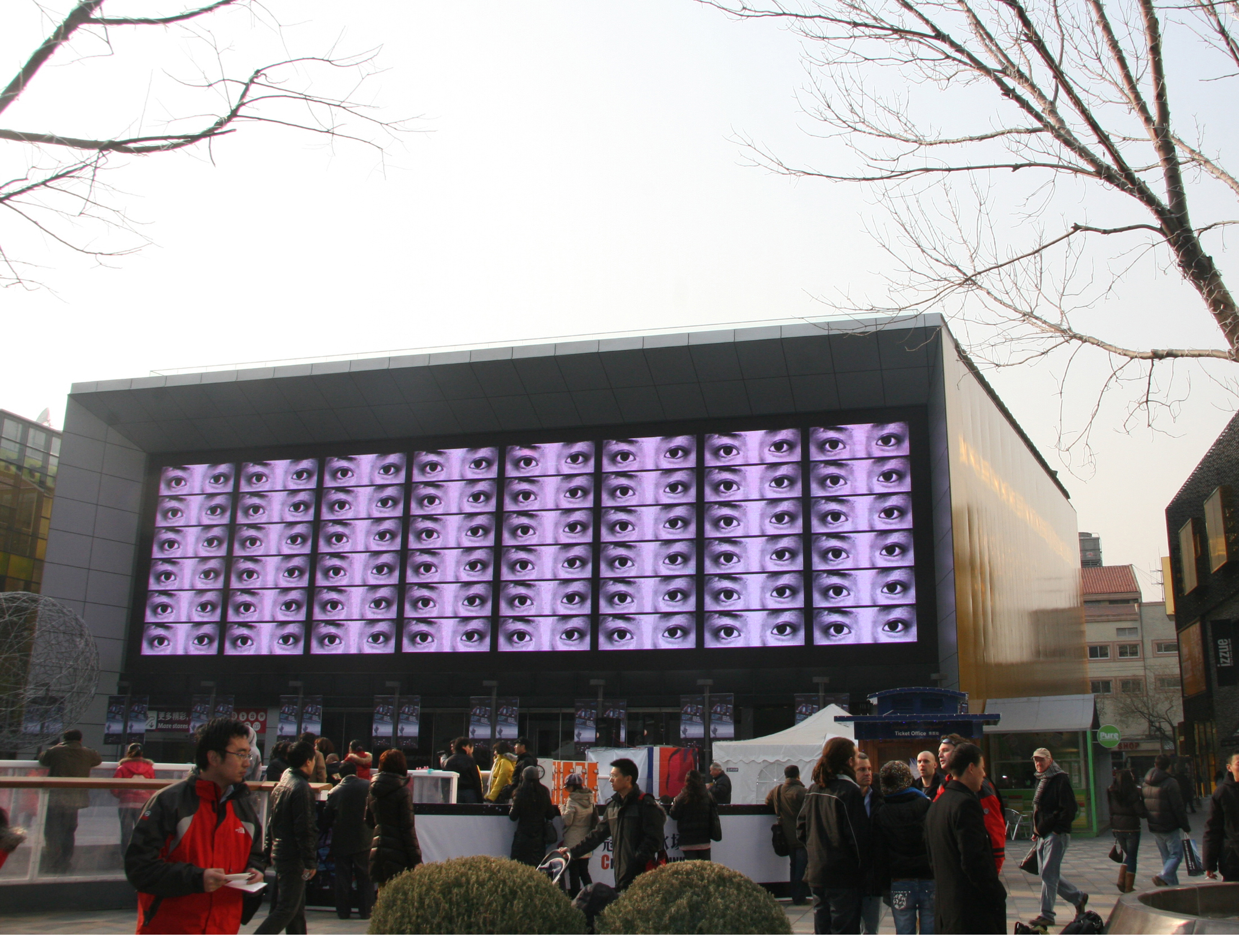
Code, 2009, Laurens Tan, ANZ Australian Film Festival, San Li Tun Village, Beijing.

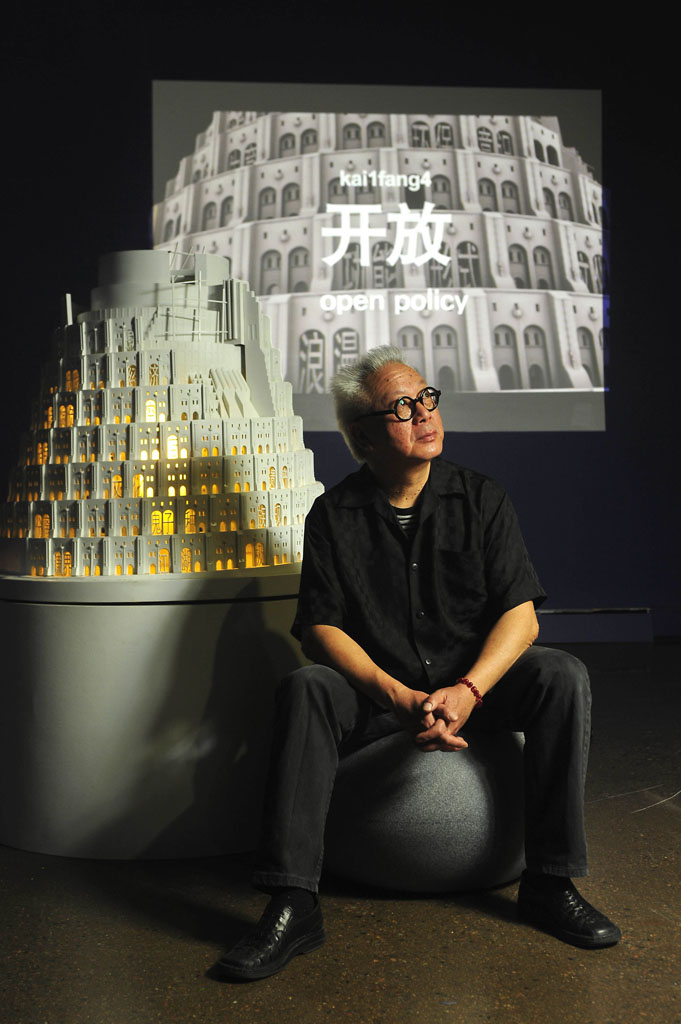
Babalogic, 2009, Laurens Tan

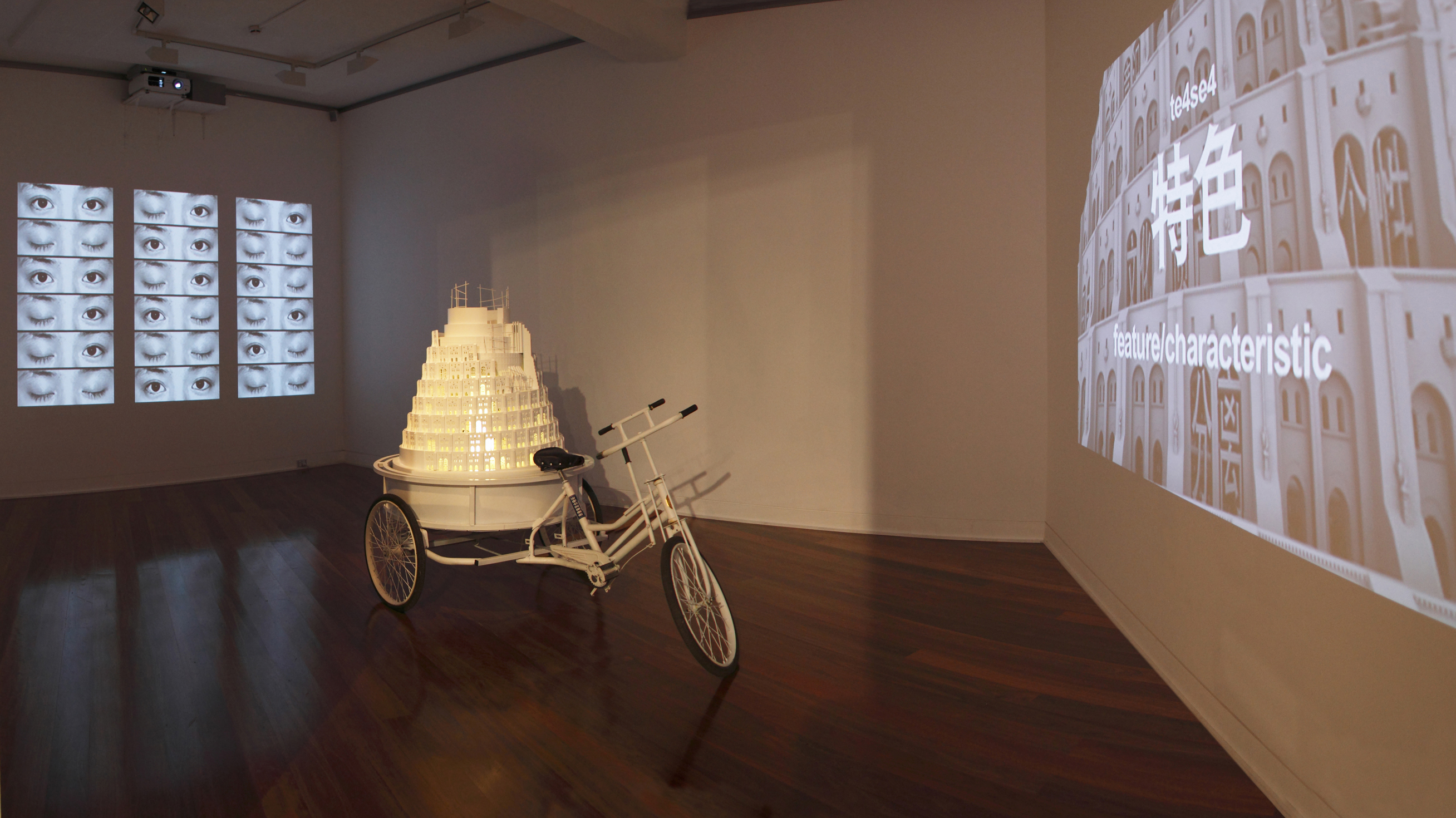
Babalogic II, 2011, Laurens Tan, PKM Gallery, Beijing.

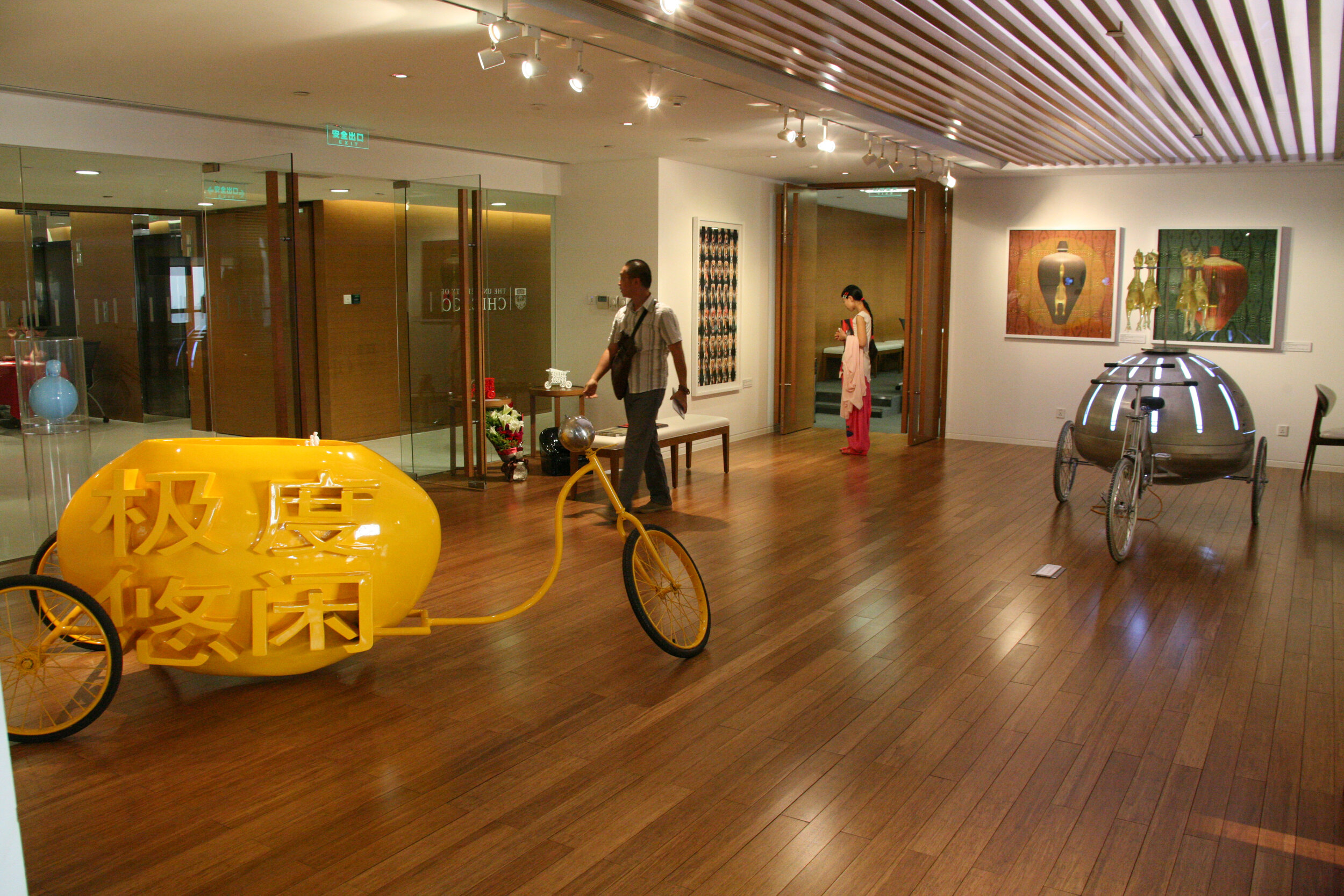
Empire Bookends, 2014, Laurens Tan, University of Chicago Beijing Center, Haidian.

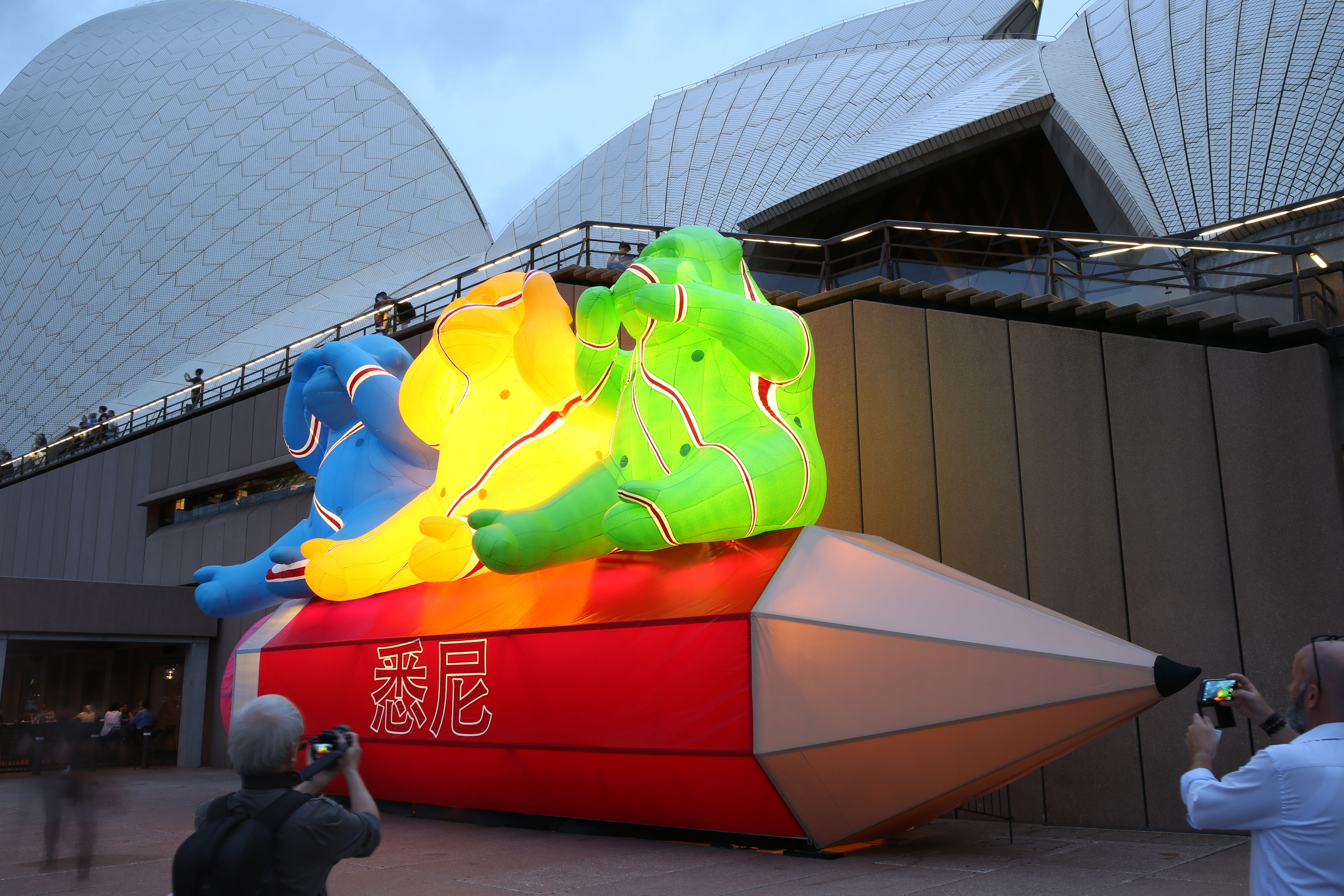
Three Wise Monkeys, 2016, Laurens Tan, Sydney Opera House, Sydney NSW.

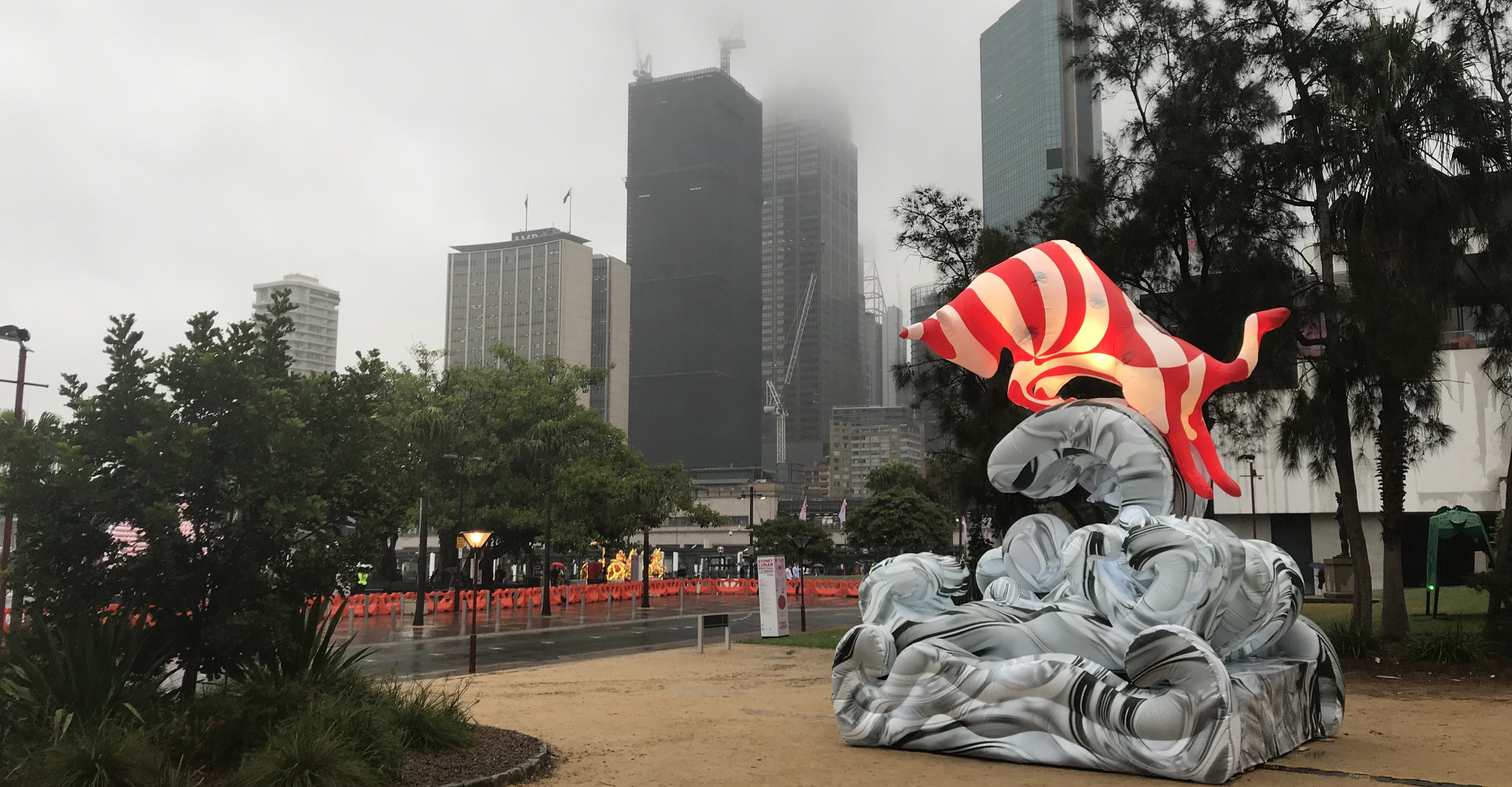
Ox Lantern, 2019, Laurens Tan, Lunar New Year Festival 2019, Sydney NSW.
