= Lindy Lee =

Australian artist

Lindy Lee AO (born 1954) is an Australian painter and sculptor of Chinese heritage, whose work blends the cultures of Australia and her ancestral China and explores her Buddhist faith. She has exhibited widely, and is particularly known for her large works of public art, such as several iterations of The Life of Stars at various locations in China and on the forecourt of the Art Gallery of South Australia, and The Garden of Cloud and Stone in Sydney's Chinatown district.

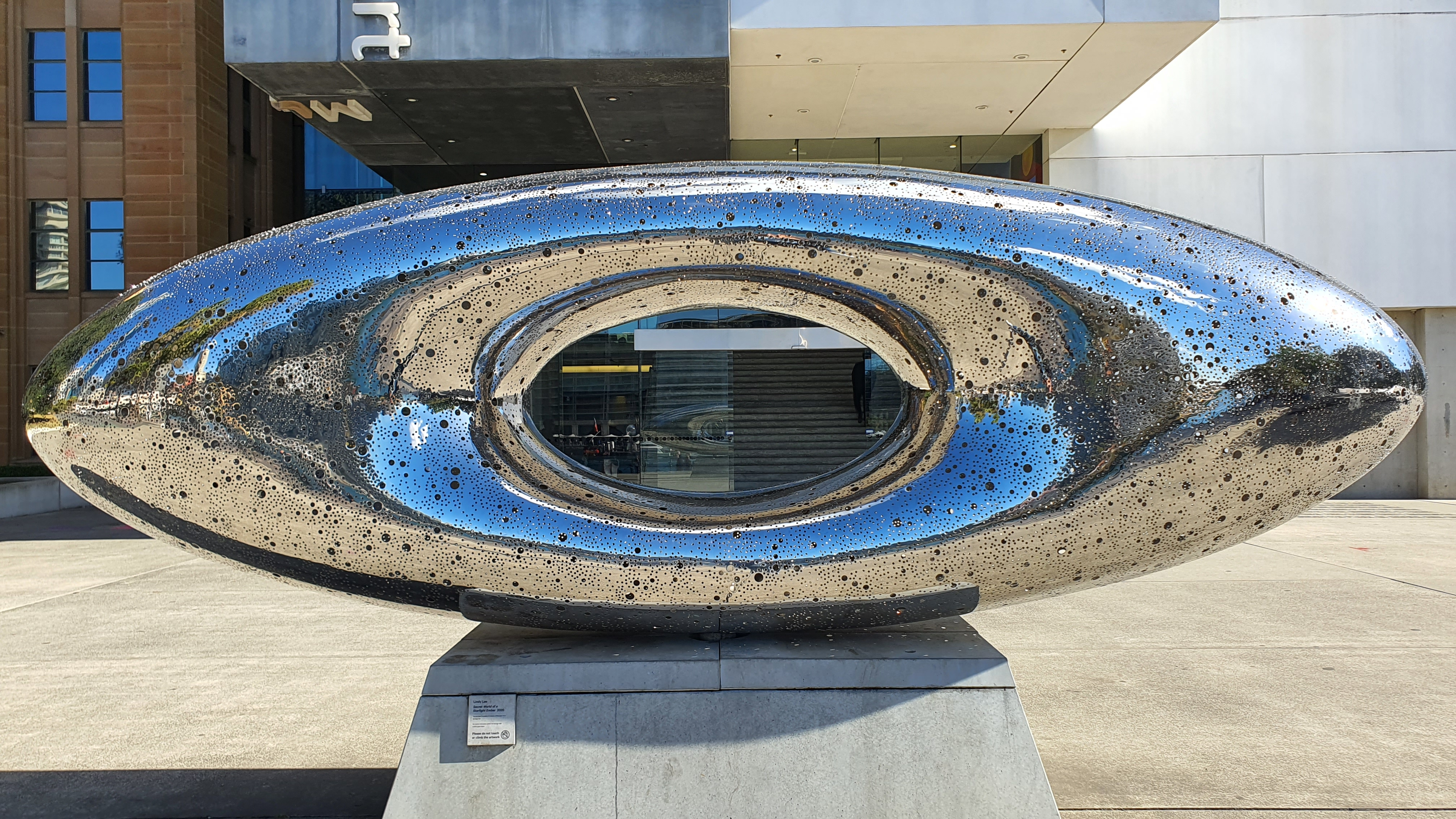
Secret World of Starlight Ember at the east side of Museum of Contemporary Art Australia

== Early life and education ==
Lee was born in 1954 in Brisbane, Queensland, the daughter of Chinese immigrants who left Guangdong province in China with their two older children after the rise of communism in that country. Her father arrived first, in 1949, and her mother and siblings, came afterwards, in 1953. Lee's experiences with racism as a child in Australia coupled with her experience of feeling alienated when visiting China because of her inability to speak in the Chinese language contributed to her interest in melding the cultures in her work.

She first qualified as a secondary school teacher at Kelvin Grove Teachers College in 1975. After encountering art galleries on a trip to Europe, she decided to pursue a career in art. She attended the Chelsea School of Art in London, after which she considered a career as an art teacher, but exposure to portraiture and contemporary art in London and elsewhere in Europe decided her to become a professional artist. During her years at graduate school at the Sydney College of the Arts in Australia she made her first portrait utilising photocopiers, a technique which featured prominently in her early work.

After decades as a practising artist, Lee attended the University of New South Wales, from which she achieved her PhD in Fine Art in 2001.

== Themes and practice ==
Initially denying her Chinese heritage and identity, she decided to embrace it and explore it in her art, initially using photos from the family album and creating two-dimensional artworks. Her later work blends the cultures of Australia and her ancestral China and explores her Buddhist faith.

Lee's work began in 1983 with a strong interest in originality and reproductions, utilising photocopiers to reproduce famous portraits over which she painted original work with acrylic paint after distorting the images. The resulting artworks raised questions about "originality and authenticity". Eventually, she began adding portraits of family and others before moving into other art forms, including sculpture. In 2008, during a residency in Kuala Lumpur, she began experimenting with first pierced paper, and then, with soldering irons and blow torches in a studio in Beijing, started burning holes in other materials, developing her distinctive "fire drawings".

As she became more involved in Zen Buddhism, she began to incorporate elements of religion in her work, which often focuses heavily on the theme of suffering. She also reflects Taoist themes, including the interconnectedness of the universe and of nature and humanity.

== Works ==
Lee's most prominent public works include several iterations of The Life of Stars at various locations in China and in Adelaide, South Australia, and The Garden of Cloud and Stone in Sydney's Chinatown district.

=== The Life of Stars ===
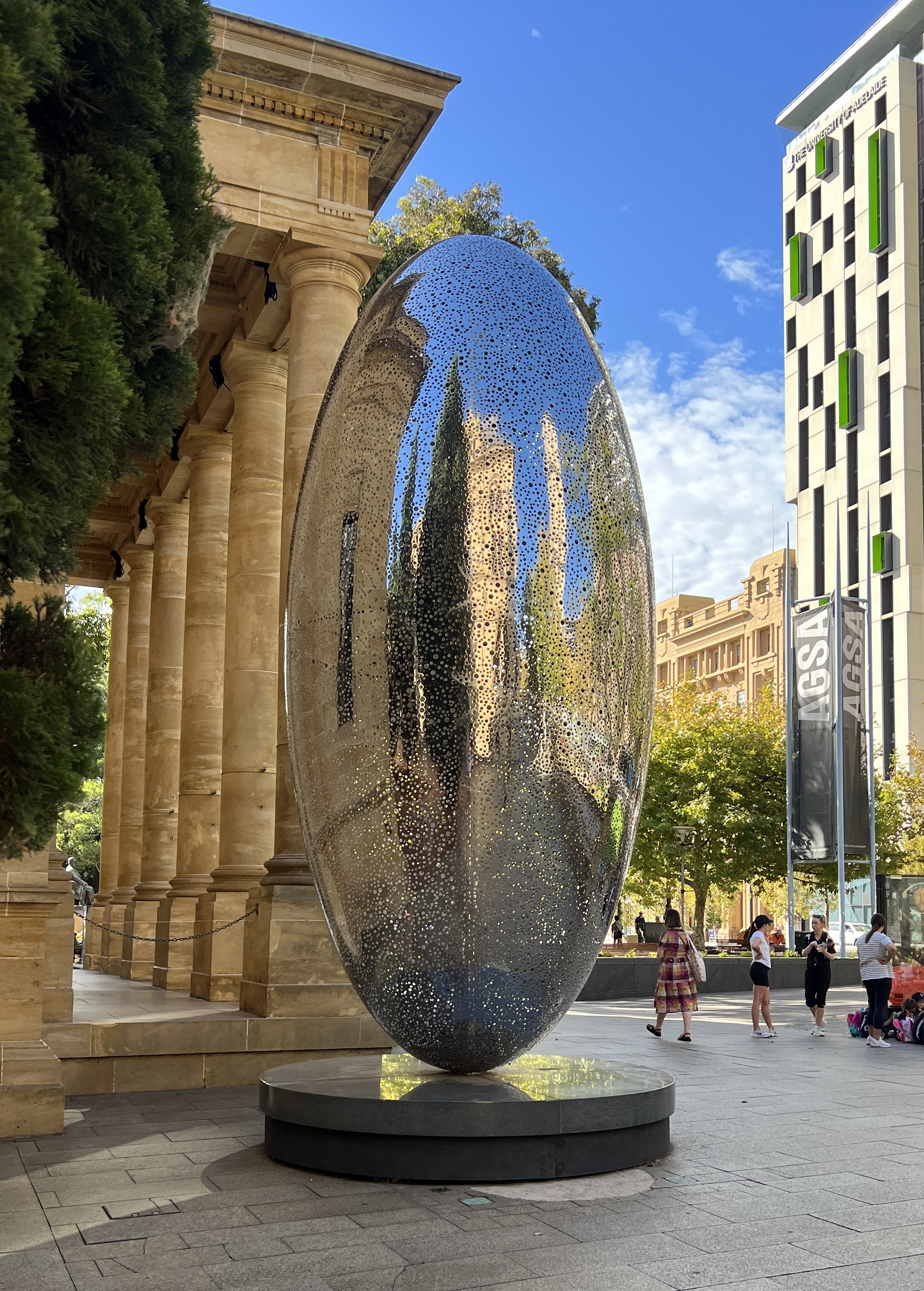
The Life of Stars by Lindy Lee outside the Art Gallery of South Australia

In 2014, Lee was commissioned by Ting Hsin International Group in Shanghai to create a public art work, at which time she first started working with Urban Art Projects (UAP) in Brisbane, using bronze. After experimenting with a technique inspired by Buddhist spiritual practice which focused on oneness with nature, UAP collaborated with her to create the 6 m (20 ft) mirror polished stainless steel, egg-shaped sculpture, The Life of Stars for the commission. The numerous piercings in the steel were arranged in overlapping concentric circles, representing "earth, life, birth and renewal" that is found in Tao and Buddhist principles, referring symbolically to the connectedness of the universe via a concept used in Mahayana Buddhism.

Several more versions of The Life of Stars now exist: in Shanghai; at the Province Midtown Cultural Centre in Zhengzhou (Life of Stars: Tenderness of Rain); and Xi'an, in China; as well as at the entrance to the Art Gallery of South Australia (AGSA) in Adelaide. The latter 6-metre (20 ft) sculpture was mounted on the AGSA forecourt after being presented for the 2018 Adelaide Biennial of Australian Art: Divided Worlds, its polished stainless steel surface reflecting its surroundings while simultaneously radiating light. Over 30,000 holes were individually placed by Lee to resemble a map of our galaxy when lit from within. The sculpture was bought for AU$550,000 by the gallery to honour the departing director Nick Mitzevich in April 2018.

=== Ouroboros ===
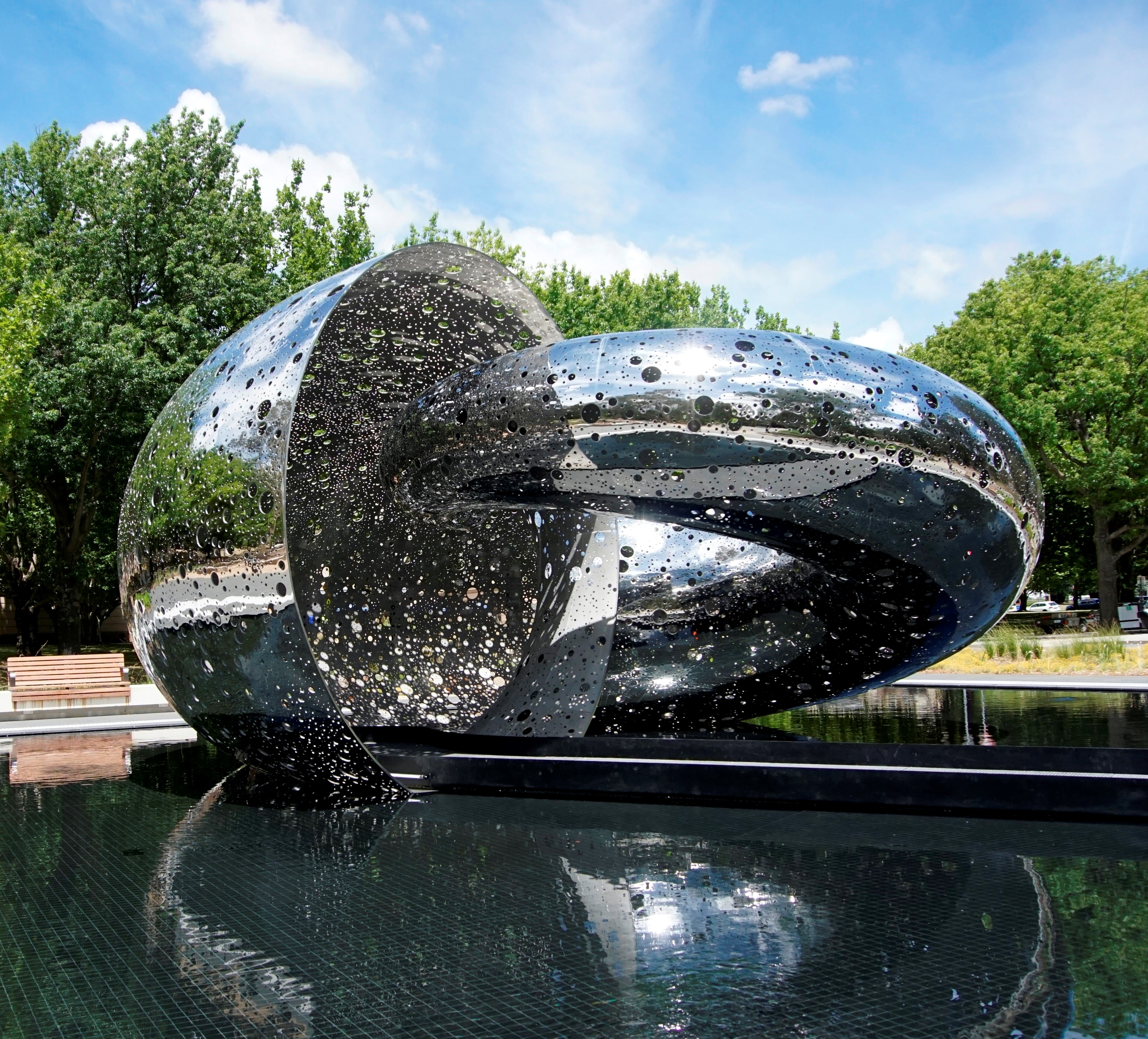
Ouroboros at the National Gallery of Australia, Canberra

In September 2021 the National Gallery of Australia (NGA) under director Nick Mitzevich commissioned an immersive 4 m (13 ft) high sculpture based on the ouroboros (an ancient symbol depicting a snake eating its own tail), to be placed near its main entrance of the gallery. Unveiled in October 2024, at 14 million dollars the sculpture is the NGA's most expensive commission to date.

Two art critics criticised the purchase in 2021: John McDonald of The Sydney Morning Herald thought that the money could have been better spent filling some significant gaps in its collection, while Christopher Allen concurred, and thought that it merely "offer[s] a passive experience to audiences who are unwilling or unable to engage more actively with works of art".

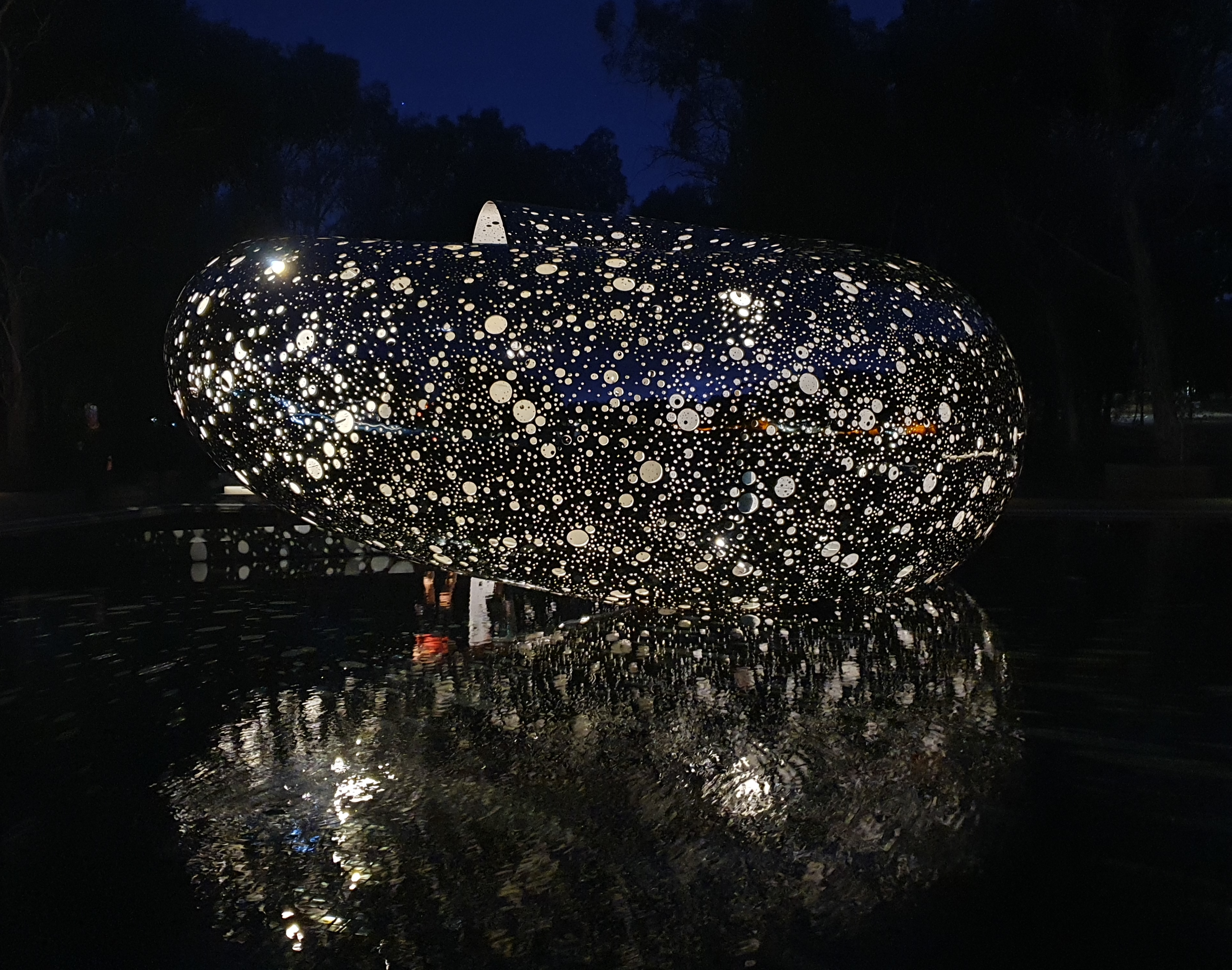
Ouroboros at night

Many later reviews of the sculpture did not emphasise the cost but reviewed it positively as "one of Australia’s first sustainable works of public art" and "local First Nations knowledge has been respected and incorporated into Ouroboros‘ installation on Ngunnawal and Ngambri Country". Other reviewers called it a "dazzling new public sculpture" and said "In Ouroboros, we have gained an enduring and accessible addition to a shared public space, a monument to the values of creativity and collaboration that deserve to be championed" and "There’s something satisfying, on a primal level, about its spiralling, curvilinear form, which evokes the work’s mythic namesake: the snake that eats itself. Instead of scales, the surface is patterned with thousands of circular holes, which disrupt the reflections of water, landscape and sky on the steel."

== Other roles ==
Lee was a founding member of Gallery 4A (now the 4A Centre for Contemporary Asian Art) in Sydney in 1996.

She was a senior lecturer at the Sydney College of the Arts (a faculty of the University of Sydney) for more than two decades, and has been a trustee at the Art Gallery of New South Wales.

She has served on the boards of Artspace Visual Arts Centre and the Australian Centre for Photography, and was president of the Asian Australian Artists Association as well as deputy chair of the Visual Arts and Crafts Fund of the Australia Council (renamed Creative Australia).

In February 2025 Lee resigned from the board of Creative Australia over its decision (passed unanimously by the board) to rescind the selection of Lebanese Australian artist Khaled Sabsabi and curator Michael Dagostino for the 61st Venice Biennale in 2026, a week after announcing the commission. Lee published a statement online in which she wrote: "Nobody except those involved can ever know how fraught and heartbreaking that meeting was. I could not live with the level of violation I felt against one of my core values — that the artist's voice must never be silenced".

== Recognition ==
Considered one of the foremost contemporary artists in the country, Lee has been commissioned to create several pieces of public art, such as Cloud Gate in Sydney's Chinatown district around 2013, consisting of cloud shapes made of brass inlaid into the footpath. Valued at approximately A$500,000, the artwork was mistakenly covered during construction of the Sydney Light Rail network in 2018, but was scheduled to be repaired.

Lee is also widely known internationally, having exhibited in Canada, China, Hong Kong, Japan, Malaysia, New Zealand and Singapore.

In 2018 Lee, in collaboration with art fabricators Urban Art Projects (UAP), won an international competition run by the New York State Department of Transportation to build a public artwork in the heart of New York's Chinatown, beating around 80 other entries. Her design, initially called "Drum Tower", is a cylindrical steel tower approximately 20 m (66 ft) high, based on the drum towers (guzou) found in villages and cities in China, marking the symbolic centre. They were used to mark nightfall and to summon the people for civic ceremonies and significant occasions, such as Chinese New Year. Following some objections to the design, later named The Dragon's Roar, the future of the sculpture was to be decided after community consultation in September 2019.

Tony Costa's oil painting of Lee won the Archibald Prize for portraiture in 2019. He said that he had been "attracted to her wisdom, humility, courage, humour and, above all, her deep focus regarding her art practice".

Elizabeth Ann Macgregor, curator of the Museum of Contemporary Art Australia (MCA), commented in 2021:

Lindy Lee's work is especially pertinent today, as society is challenged by the realisation of the extent of the climate crisis, the impact of the COVID-19 pandemic which separates rather than connects people, the rise of populist policies that foster racism, and the Black Lives Matter movement... Lee's work is essentially concerned with the direct and intimate connection between humans and the universe, as a consequence of her exploration of her own identity, living between two cultures and her study of Zen Buddhism.

Lee was appointed an Officer of the Order of Australia in the 2024 Australia Day Honours for "distinguished service to contemporary visual arts as a sculptor and painter, and to arts administration through leadership roles".

== Exhibitions ==
Lee started exhibiting her work in the 1980s. She has exhibited widely, with shows outside Australia in the United States, Germany, Canada, China, Hong Kong, Japan, Malaysia, New Zealand and Singapore.

In 1991, Lee was included in Frames of Reference: Aspects of Feminism and Art at Artspace. Her work, along with that of two other Asian Australian artists, was featured in the inaugural exhibition of Gallery 4A (now the 4A Centre for Contemporary Asian Art) in 1997.

In 2014, the University of Queensland Art Museum mounted a survey of her work to date.

From 2 October 2020 until 28 February 2021, Lindy Lee: Moon in a Dew Drop, the largest ever solo exhibition of Lee's work, was mounted at the MCA in Sydney, curated by Elizabeth Ann Macgregor. The exhibition features more than 70 artworks, including a number of new works specially commissioned for the MCA. The exhibition then went on tour, starting with a stint at the Western Plains Cultural Centre in Dubbo, New South Wales, from 22 May to 1 August 2021, to be followed by the Lismore Regional Gallery in Lismore (NSW); Artspace Mackay (Queensland); Devonport Regional Gallery (Tasmania); and the John Curtin Gallery (Perth, WA), finishing on 24 July 2022.

== Personal life ==
Lee was married to photographer Robert Scott-Mitchell (1954-2021), whose portrait of her won the National Photographic Portrait Prize in 2007. They lived in the Northern Rivers region of New South Wales from 2014 until his death from cancer in June 2021.

Lee has long been a practising Buddhist, which infuses both her life and her work.
