= Textaqueen =

Australian artist (born 1975)

TextaQueen (born 1975), formerly known as Arlene TextaQueen, is an Australian artist. They (Note: TextaQueen self-identifies with the pronouns they/them.) primarily work on paper with felt-tip marker pens commonly referred to as textas in Australia.

== Early life and education ==
TextaQueen was born in 1975 in Perth, Western Australia, of Indian heritage. They received a Bachelor of Fine Arts from the University of Western Australia in 1995 and a Certificate in Interactive Multimedia from Metro Screen in Sydney in 1998.

== Career ==
TextaQueen exhibited TextaNudes, undressed portraits of women, queer, and trans performers, to positive reviews at Sullivan and Strumpf Fine Art in Sydney in March 2011. Elizabeth Robinson of ArtWrite noted in 2011 that TextaQueen "[had] found a way to take the texta out of kindergarten and into contemporary fine art". Their work also appears in the National Gallery of Australia.

TextaQueen's 2014 show Coconut Legacy "used tigers, coconuts and Allen's chocolate chico babies to map the conflict between white supremacy and their Goan-Indian heritage". Their survey exhibition "Between You and Me" was on display at Benalla Art Gallery and Tweed Regional Gallery in 2017 and 2018.

As of December 2017 TextaQueen was "creating a series of works about diversity, tokenism, and the experiences of 'minority artists' in the institutional arts complex". They were also holding drawing workshops for children and adults.

They had a creative fellowship at the State Library Victoria in which they drew on their own experiences, interviewed artists, and used the Library's political posters collection to produce a poster series addressing contemporary experiences of culturally diverse and otherwise marginalised artists.

Textaqueen's work has been highlighted in She Persists: Perspectives on Women in Art & Design published by the National Gallery of Victoria.

== Recognition ==
In 2021, TextaQueen was awarded the inaugural artistic commission of the Copyright Agency's Copyright Agency Partnerships three-year series. The series, awarded in partnership with the 4A Centre for Contemporary Asian Art, the Australian Centre for Contemporary Art in Melbourne, and the Institute of Modern Art in Brisbane, is worth A$80,000, and designed to support mid-career and established visual artists with a commission and a solo exhibition.

== Current practice ==
TextaQueen lives in New York City and Carlton, Victoria, and as of December 2018 works on Boon wurrung and Wurundjeri country. As of 2021 they are referred to as simply TextaQueen.
