= Copyright Agency Ltd =

Australian copyright agency

Copyright Agency Ltd (CAL) is an Australian not-for-profit public company that facilitates reuse of copyrighted material by third parties, collecting fees and delivering the payments to the creators. Its business names include Viscopy, Rightsportal and Smarteditions.

It is officially appointed by the Australian Government to administer the management and payment of royalties to creators, including acting for educational institutions.

== History ==
On 2 July 2012, Copyright Agency and Viscopy (formerly Visual Arts Copyright Collecting Agency or VISCOPY) entered into an arrangement whereby Copyright Agency would manage Viscopy’s business.

On 30 November 2017, Viscopy merged fully with Copyright Agency. This name is still retained as a trading name.

== What it does ==
The company has been officially appointed by the Australian Government to manage the Australian education copying scheme, under the Statutory Education Licence. It also manages the Commonwealth, State and Territory government copying schemes and the Resale Royalty Scheme for artists.

Educational institutions (or a body administering an educational institution) may claim a Statutory Educational licence under Part VB of the Copyright Act 1968 by:

1. publishing a notice in the Commonwealth of Australia Gazette (universities, TAFE institutes, full-time primary and secondary schools, pre-schools and kindergartens are exempt from this requirement); and
2. Completing the Statutory Educational license notice and returning to CAL; and
3. Entering into a CAL Educational license by completing the agreement and returning to CAL.

An annual fee is payable by participating educational institutions based on estimated usage of copyright material, usually determined by student numbers.

== John Fries Award ==
The John Fries Award was established in 2010, named in honour former Viscopy director and honorary treasurer, John Fries. Awarded annually to an emerging visual artists, it is a non-acquisitive art prize worth A$10,000, sponsored by the CAL Cultural Fund, UNSW Galleries and Art Van Go.

== Copyright Agency Partnerships ==
In April 2021, the Copyright Agency’s cultural fund announced the launch of a Copyright Agency Partnerships (CAP) three-year artistic commission series, in partnership with 4A Centre for Contemporary Asian Art in Sydney, the Australian Centre for Contemporary Art in Melbourne, and the Institute of Modern Art in Brisbane. The commissions, worth A$80,000, are designed to support mid-career and established visual artists with a commission as well as a solo exhibition, and will run for three years (2021–2024). The granting of the award is judged by representatives of the three institutions and an independent peer. The inaugural winner of the award was TextaQueen, whose project Bollywouldn’t will be exhibited at A4 in 2022.

== Commentary ==
Nicholas Gruen commented in 2008 that the cash-strapped educational sector was paying unnecessarily high royalties to CAL, and suggested that a public subsidy to content creators. He also criticised CAL for seeking royalties from for old surveyors' maps held in the New South Wales Government's land registry, for which surveyors have already been paid and which had been deposited on the public record and therefore free for use.

== See also ==
- Australian Copyright Council
- Copyright agency
- Copyright law of Australia
