= Copyright agency =

A copyright agency is a not-for-profit organisation which sets royalty rates, administers copyright registration databases, and issues interpretations of copyright statutes. Copyright is a kind of intellectual property concept and legislation which protects the original expression of ideas. Creators can use it to manage how their content is reproduced.

== Function ==
The core function of the copyright agency is to set and issue licences to users of copyright-protected material, collect licence revenue and distribute these as royalties money collected fairly and equitably to copyright owners and creators. While some copyright agencies may also act as copyright collection societies, not all have that authority, and many copyright collection societies are only authorised by the government to manage schemes on their behalf.

They think that creators and publishers should receive a fair reward when their work is re-used. The way to ensure this is to issue licences to organisations that want to copy and re-use their published work. The licence fees collected are then passed on to the copyright owners - the authors, publishers and visual artists - that they represent.

Any organisation photocopying, scanning or digitally reproducing material from copyright publications will usually require a licence to ensure legal compliance. The licences help to reduce the risk and potential cost of copyright infringement. This requirement applies to organisations in the business, education, public or charitable sector.

== See also ==
- Copyright Agency Ltd, an Australian company
