= Art Monthly Australasia =

Australian visual arts periodical established 1987

Art Monthly Australasia, also known as Art Monthly and formerly titled Art Monthly Australia, is an Australian visual arts magazine published since 1987.

Since 1992 the magazine has been published by non-profit publisher Art Monthly Australia Ltd under the auspices of the Australian National University's School of Art & Design in Canberra.

The full-time editors have included Peter Townsend, Peter Timms, Philippa Kelly, Deborah Clark, Maurice O’Riordan and as of September 2021 since 2014, Michael Fitzgerald.

The magazine features articles that provide context and expand on the critical discourse about art in both the Asia-Pacific region and Australia.
