= List of listed buildings in South Lanarkshire =

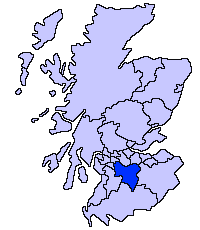
South Lanarkshire shown within Scotland

This is a list of listed buildings in South Lanarkshire. The list is split out by parish.

- List of listed buildings in Avondale, South Lanarkshire
- List of listed buildings in Biggar, South Lanarkshire
- List of listed buildings in Blantyre, South Lanarkshire
- List of listed buildings in Bothwell, South Lanarkshire
- List of listed buildings in Cambuslang, South Lanarkshire
- List of listed buildings in Carluke, South Lanarkshire
- List of listed buildings in Carmichael, South Lanarkshire
- List of listed buildings in Carmunnock, South Lanarkshire
- List of listed buildings in Carnwath, South Lanarkshire
- List of listed buildings in Carstairs, South Lanarkshire
- List of listed buildings in Covington, South Lanarkshire
- List of listed buildings in Crawford, South Lanarkshire
- List of listed buildings in Crawfordjohn, South Lanarkshire
- List of listed buildings in Culter, South Lanarkshire
- List of listed buildings in Dalserf, South Lanarkshire
- List of listed buildings in Dolphinton, South Lanarkshire
- List of listed buildings in Douglas, South Lanarkshire
- List of listed buildings in Dunsyre, South Lanarkshire
- List of listed buildings in East Kilbride, South Lanarkshire
- List of listed buildings in Glassford, South Lanarkshire
- List of listed buildings in Hamilton, South Lanarkshire
- List of listed buildings in Lanark, South Lanarkshire
- List of listed buildings in Lesmahagow, South Lanarkshire
- List of listed buildings in Libberton, South Lanarkshire
- List of listed buildings in Pettinain, South Lanarkshire
- List of listed buildings in Rutherglen, South Lanarkshire
- List of listed buildings in Stonehouse, South Lanarkshire
- List of listed buildings in Symington, South Lanarkshire
- List of listed buildings in Walston, South Lanarkshire
- List of listed buildings in Wandel And Lamington, South Lanarkshire
- List of listed buildings in Wiston And Roberton, South Lanarkshire

== See also ==
- List of Category A listed buildings in South Lanarkshire
- Scheduled monuments in South Lanarkshire
