= David Livingstone Birthplace Museum =

Museum in South Lanarkshire, Scotland

Coordinates: 55.80223°N 4.08385°W

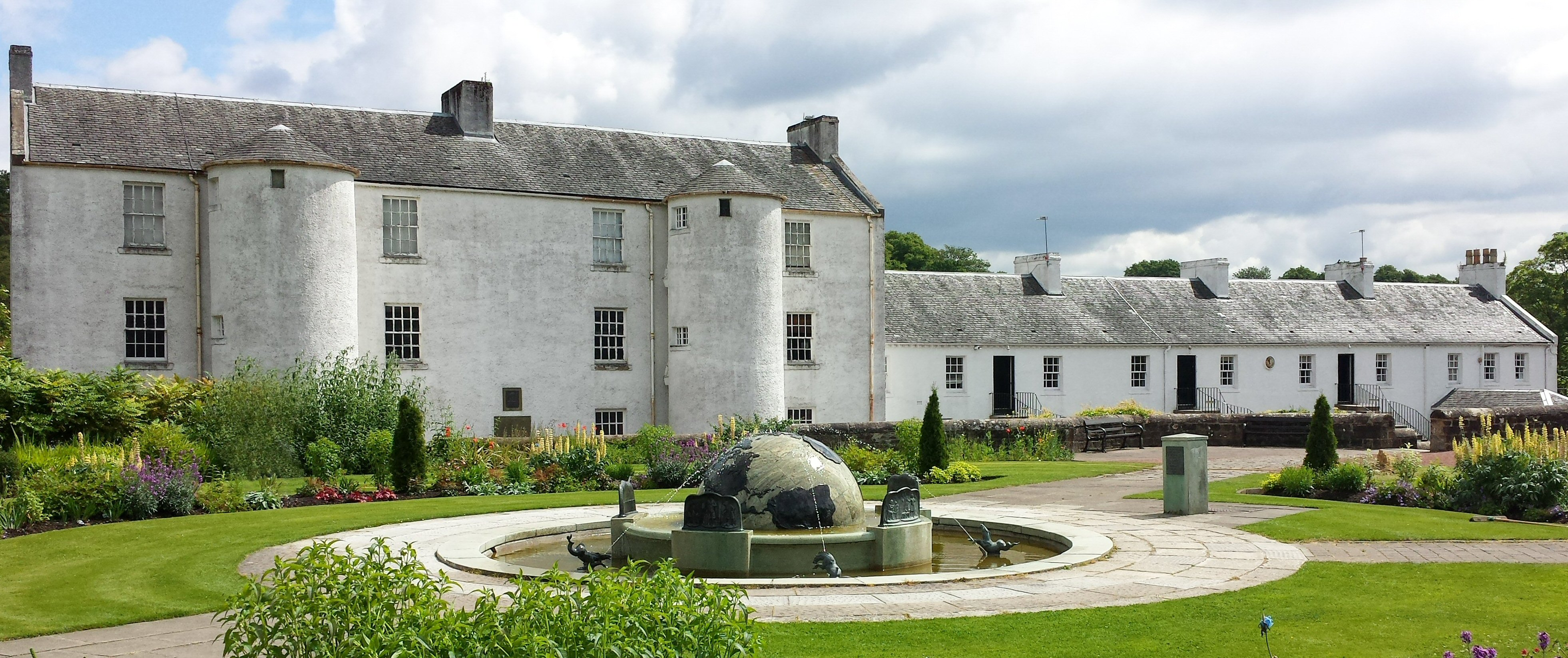
Shuttle Row, Livingstone's birthplace and childhood home, is the Birthplace's museum. It opened in 1929.

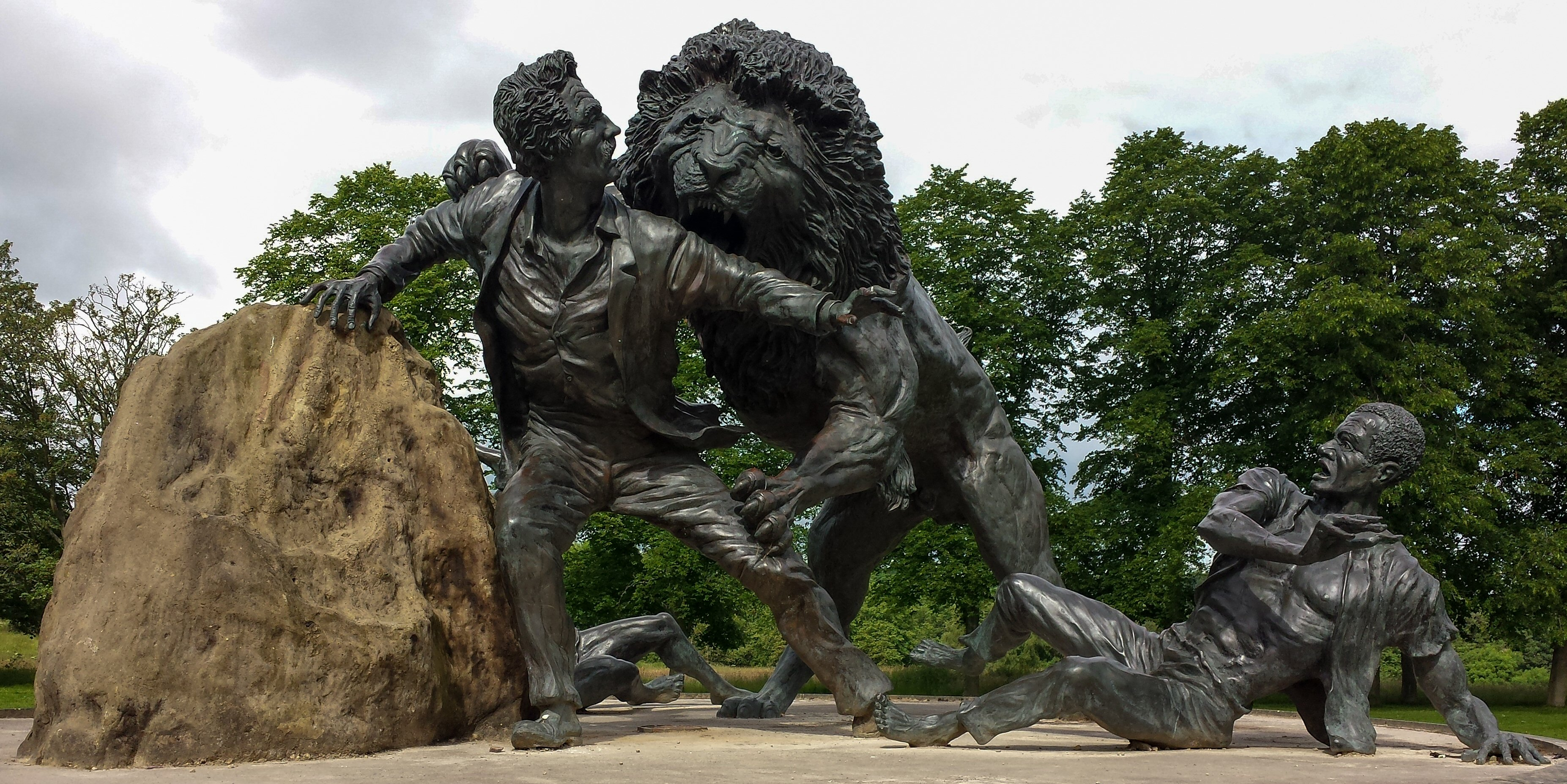
Livingstone and the Lion bronze by Ray Harryhausen and Gareth Knowles in the gardens of the centre

The David Livingstone Birthplace Museum is a biographical museum in Blantyre, South Lanarkshire, Scotland, dedicated to the life and work of the explorer and missionary David Livingstone. The museum is operated by the David Livingstone Trust and is housed in a category A listed building often referred to as Shuttle Row. The museum rests on the grounds of the David Livingstone Birthplace, which contains historic grounds as well as the museum.

It is located in the former textile mill buildings which once housed 24 families including Livingstone's, and where he was born on 19 March 1813.

The Collection at the David Livingstone Birthplace Museum held by The Scottish National Memorial to David Livingstone Trust (SC015490) contains a diverse range of material exploring the life, work and legacy of David Livingstone (including his family and associates) and the history of Blantyre Mills and Village. The centre depicts Livingstone's life from his early childhood working in the mill, to his travels throughout Southern Africa. These are illustrated with the aid of various pieces of his navigational and medical equipment, interspersed with artefacts from Livingstone's family, contemporaries, and Southern Africa.

== History ==
=== Inception of the Memorial ===
A committee to promote the creation of a Scottish National Memorial to David Livingstone was established in 1925 and the tenement in which Livingstone was born was acquired in 1927. In 1926, the architect and town planner Sir Frank Mears was engaged to oversee the development of the project. In 1929 and in front of a crowd of twelve thousand, the Memorial was opened by Elizabeth, Duchess of York (wife of the future King George VI)

The early "vision" of DLT was formed from rising concerns towards the dilapidated condition of the Blantyre Cotton Spinning Works (including David Livingstone's birthplace in Shuttle Row), and the desire to create a permanent memorial to celebrate his life and legacy. In 1913, the centenary year of David Livingstone's birth, the buildings became condemned unfit for human habitation.

This resulted in the steady formation of a movement led in-part by architect Sir Frank Charles Mears and Rev. James I. MacNair concerned for the preservation of the Shuttle Row and associated site buildings. This culminated in the creation of an Emergency Executive Committee in January 1926. That same year, a broader vision to develop Shuttle Row into a memorial and visitor attraction unfolded and an international appeal was launched.

On Whitsunday (5 June) 1927, the Executive Committee successfully acquired the site. With the site and buildings being secured, work on Shuttle Row was able to begin and the collection was able to subsequently grow, with an official opening ceremony on 5 October 1929 when Elizabeth, Duchess of York opened it in front of a crowd of 12000 people

The "Scottish National Memorial to David Livingstone Trust" (DLT) became legally recognised through its "Memorandum and Articles of Association" on 20 October 1930.

=== The National Trust For Scotland ===
From 1999, the operational aspects at the Centre have been delivered through a Tripartite Management Agreement with the National Trust for Scotland (NTS), South Lanarkshire Council (SLC) and the David Livingstone Trust. NTS operated the Centre (including managing the Collection) with SLC undertaking the maintenance of the wider site.

=== Current Governance ===
The Museum is now operated by the David Livingstone Trust, as of April 2017. The Trust have been successful in getting a £6.3 million grant for the refurbishment of the museum, collection and cafe buildings as part of the Birthplace Project. The project has been funded by the Heritage Lottery Fund, Historic Environment Scotland and the Scottish Government.

== Museum Collection ==
=== Southern African Objects ===
David Livingstone's writings and illustrations provide a detailed account into the cultural identities of the communities, people and environments he made contact with during his expeditions throughout Southern Africa. The diaries and writings of those who knew, worked with or came into contact with David Livingstone provide further insights into the collection; a key example being the inventory created by Jacob Wainwright soon after David Livingstone died, written into Livingstone's last field diary.

=== Blantyre Cotton Works ===
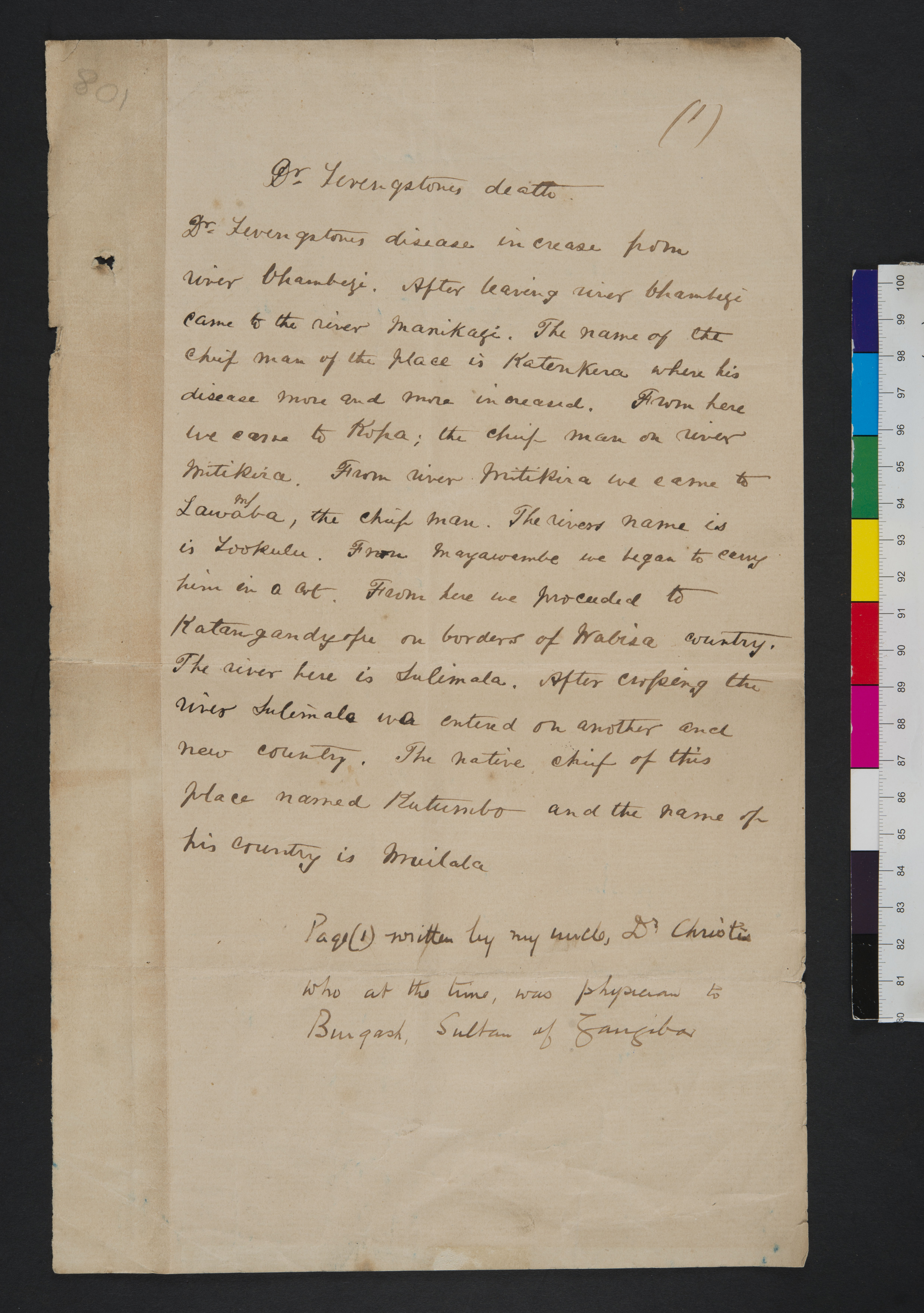
A letter written by Jacob Wainwright in 1873 recalling the death of David Livingstone

The collecting of material related to Blantyre Cotton Works was led by a desire to preserve the buildings and the heritage of the site as central to the understanding of David Livingstone's early life, including his family, home and work. This process began in 1927 with the acquisition of 19th century Blantyre Works Library and progressed with the steady acquisition of objects provenanced to the Blantyre Cotton Works including items such as bobbins used in mill, a handkerchief spun, woven and dyed at the Blantyre Works, the Works Bell, the Blantyre Works boardroom table, and a range archival material. In addition, there are some objects representative or associated with Blantyre Cotton Works including a model of Blantyre Works by Charles d’Orville Pilkington Jackson and a spinning jenny.

=== Pilkington-Jackson ===
Charles D'Orville Pilkington Jackson was commissioned to sculpt several bronze tableaux depicting the life of Livingstone and a World Fountain in the Memorial grounds prior to the opening in 1929. After opening in 1929, an additional sculpture by Pilkington-Jackson was carved from oak and named "The Last Journey" prior to being placed on display from 1930.

=== Haswell-Miller ===
In a similar vein to the Pilkington-Jackson tableaux, the early founders of DLT had a desire to develop artistic representations of David Livingstone's life through the creation of imaginative story-focused displays. The initial appointment of Archibald Elliot Haswell Miller resulted in the creation of works designed to fit with the thematic scheme of each gallery. This included a series of 8 wall panels executed in tempera telling the story of David Livingstone's early life installed prior to opening in 1929 before being supplemented by a further four murals and recorded as such in 1932. Each of the murals were financed through concerted efforts by DLT, successfully seeking support from a range of Christian, youth and educational establishments across Scotland. Since 1932, this collection has steadily grown to include a total of 19 works by Haswell Miller consisting of paintings executed on canvas and board representative of themes and stories related to David Livingstone.

=== Blantyre Works Library ===
The Blantyre Works Library is a significant collection of 18th century - early 20th century books which was made available to the workers of the Blantyre Works Mill. These books would have been available to David Livingstone and his family when they lived in Shuttle Row in the 1800s.

== See also ==
- List of Category A listed buildings in South Lanarkshire
- List of listed buildings in Blantyre, South Lanarkshire
- List of museums in Scotland
