= List of listed buildings in Covington, South Lanarkshire =

This is a list of listed buildings in the parish of Covington in South Lanarkshire, Scotland.

== List ==
Name	Location	Date Listed	Grid Ref. (Note: Sometimes known as OSGB36, the grid reference (where provided) is based on the British national grid reference system used by the Ordnance Survey. • "Guide to National Grid". Ordnance Survey. • "Get-a-map". Ordnance Survey.)	Geo-coordinates	Notes	LB Number (Note: Historic Environment Scotland assign a unique alphanumeric identifier to each designated site in Scotland, for listed buildings this always begins with "LB", for example "LB12345".)	Image
Covington Tower				55°38′30″N 3°37′49″W	Category A	648	Upload another image See more images
Parish Church And Graveyard				55°38′25″N 3°37′49″W	Category A	5094	Upload another image See more images
Dovecot Covington Mains				55°38′32″N 3°37′47″W	Category A	649	Upload Photo
Thankerton Bridge				55°37′39″N 3°37′26″W	Category B	652	Upload another image See more images
St. John's Kirk				55°36′23″N 3°36′49″W	Category B	653	Upload Photo
Newtown Of Covington, 82-94 Covington Road				55°38′06″N 3°37′34″W	Category B	651	Upload Photo
85 Covington Road, Covington				55°38′05″N 3°37′36″W	Category C(S)	44022	Upload Photo
Former School, Covington Road, Covington				55°38′06″N 3°37′36″W	Category C(S)	44023	Upload Photo
Manse				55°38′25″N 3°37′51″W	Category B	650	Upload Photo
Old Toll House Falburn				55°37′23″N 3°38′39″W	Category C(S)	654	Upload Photo

== Key ==
The scheme for classifying buildings in Scotland is:

- Category A: "buildings of national or international importance, either architectural or historic; or fine, little-altered examples of some particular period, style or building type."
- Category B: "buildings of regional or more than local importance; or major examples of some particular period, style or building type, which may have been altered."
- Category C: "buildings of local importance; lesser examples of any period, style, or building type, as originally constructed or moderately altered; and simple traditional buildings which group well with other listed buildings."

In March 2016 there were 47,288 listed buildings in Scotland. Of these, 8% were Category A, and 50% were Category B, with the remaining 42% being Category C.
