= List of listed buildings in Crawford, South Lanarkshire =

This is a list of listed buildings in the parish of Crawford in South Lanarkshire, Scotland.

== List ==
Name	Location	Date Listed	Grid Ref. (Note: Sometimes known as OSGB36, the grid reference (where provided) is based on the British national grid reference system used by the Ordnance Survey. • "Guide to National Grid". Ordnance Survey. • "Get-a-map". Ordnance Survey.)	Geo-coordinates	Notes	LB Number (Note: Historic Environment Scotland assign a unique alphanumeric identifier to each designated site in Scotland, for listed buildings this always begins with "LB", for example "LB12345".)	Image
Market Cross				55°28′18″N 3°39′34″W	Category B	730	Upload Photo
Crawford, Post Horn Hotel Including Block To Rear And Detached Block				55°28′18″N 3°39′31″W	Category B	6458	Upload Photo
Suspension Footbridge, Elvanfoot				55°26′28″N 3°39′18″W	Category B	6372	Upload Photo
Leadhills, 15 Main Street, Miners' Library Including Boundary Wall				55°25′01″N 3°45′36″W	Category C(S)	50593	Upload Photo
Crawford, Carlisle Road, Former Parish Church				55°28′12″N 3°39′13″W	Category B	6667	Upload Photo
Leadhills, Hopetoun Arms				55°24′57″N 3°45′39″W	Category B	733	Upload Photo
Old Graveyard, Kirkton				55°28′21″N 3°41′26″W	Category B	729	Upload Photo
Leadhills Village Scots Mining Company House And Garden Walls				55°24′52″N 3°45′40″W	Category A	732	Upload Photo
Crawford Castle				55°28′29″N 3°39′21″W	Category B	731	Upload Photo
Curfew Bell And Weathervane, Bell View, Leadhills				55°24′58″N 3°45′44″W	Category C(S)	50882	Upload Photo

== Key ==
The scheme for classifying buildings in Scotland is:

- Category A: "buildings of national or international importance, either architectural or historic; or fine, little-altered examples of some particular period, style or building type."
- Category B: "buildings of regional or more than local importance; or major examples of some particular period, style or building type, which may have been altered."
- Category C: "buildings of local importance; lesser examples of any period, style, or building type, as originally constructed or moderately altered; and simple traditional buildings which group well with other listed buildings."

In March 2016 there were 47,288 listed buildings in Scotland. Of these, 8% were Category A, and 50% were Category B, with the remaining 42% being Category C.
