= List of listed buildings in Lesmahagow Parish, South Lanarkshire =

This is a list of listed buildings in the parish of Lesmahagow in South Lanarkshire, Scotland.

== List ==
Name	Location	Date Listed	Grid Ref. (Note: Sometimes known as OSGB36, the grid reference (where provided) is based on the British national grid reference system used by the Ordnance Survey. • "Guide to National Grid". Ordnance Survey. • "Get-a-map". Ordnance Survey.)	Geo-coordinates	Notes	LB Number (Note: Historic Environment Scotland assign a unique alphanumeric identifier to each designated site in Scotland, for listed buildings this always begins with "LB", for example "LB12345".)	Image
Auchlochan Bridge				55°37′06″N 3°53′26″W	Category B	7688	Upload another image
Folkerton Mill				55°36′12″N 3°48′56″W	Category B	7695	Upload Photo
Old Lesmahagow Church, And Graveyard				55°38′18″N 3°53′07″W	Category B	7675	Upload Photo
Craignethan Castle				55°41′46″N 3°53′06″W	Category A	7677	Upload another image
West Hawksland				55°38′21″N 3°49′57″W	Category C(S)	7694	Upload Photo
Birkwood, South Lodge And Gateway, New Trows Road				55°37′45″N 3°53′40″W	Category B	7699	Upload Photo
Lesmahagow Village, Royal Bank Of Scotland Including Boundary Walls And Gatepiers				55°38′24″N 3°53′12″W	Category B	7701	Upload Photo
Kirkmuirhill Parish Church (United Presbyterian Church) Including Railings And Church Hall				55°39′53″N 3°54′36″W	Category C(S)	48138	Upload Photo
Turfholm Bridge				55°38′03″N 3°53′11″W	Category C(S)	7676	Upload Photo
Corra Castle				55°39′12″N 3°46′40″W	Category A	7680	Upload another image
Clydevale				55°42′05″N 3°51′59″W	Category B	7686	Upload Photo
81/83 Lanark Road Crossford Village				55°41′55″N 3°52′06″W	Category C(S)	7687	Upload Photo
Birkhill, Including Stable Wing				55°36′00″N 3°50′41″W	Category B	7692	Upload Photo
Birkwood House				55°37′59″N 3°53′22″W	Category B	7698	Upload Photo
Auchenheath House Including Coach House, Garden Terraces And Balustrades, South Entrance Gatepiers And Walls				55°40′15″N 3°54′00″W	Category B	51053	Upload Photo
162 Riverside Road, Kirkfieldbank				55°40′30″N 3°48′25″W	Category C(S)	44600	Upload Photo
Douglasmouth Bridge				55°37′51″N 3°45′55″W	Category B	7689	Upload Photo
Stables, Harperfield				55°38′18″N 3°45′47″W	Category C(S)	7691	Upload Photo
Lesmahagow Village, Old Roadbridge West Of Milton Road/Carlisle Junction At Ngr 8145 4054				55°38′38″N 3°53′06″W	Category B	7703	Upload Photo
West Toun, Coalburn, Statue Of A Highlander				55°35′01″N 3°51′39″W	Category B	13402	Upload Photo
Lesmahagow Village, Abbeygreen Free Church of Scotland and Manse Including Boundary Walls And Gatepiers				55°38′27″N 3°53′12″W	Category B	11729	Upload Photo
Off New Trows Road, Birkwood South Driveway Bridge				55°37′49″N 3°53′39″W	Category C(S)	11726	Upload Photo
Dovecot, Blackwood House				55°40′06″N 3°56′55″W	Category B	7678	Upload Photo
Corehouse, Dovecot				55°39′13″N 3°46′54″W	Category C(S)	7681	Upload Photo
Crossford Bridge				55°41′51″N 3°52′01″W	Category B	7684	Upload Photo
Greenrig				55°39′34″N 3°49′09″W	Category B	7693	Upload Photo
Nos 15-19 Bereholm, Lesmahagow				55°38′14″N 3°53′06″W	Category B	7696	Upload Photo
Lesmahagow Village, Old Bridge West Of Milton Road At Ngr Ns 8148 4044				55°38′35″N 3°53′04″W	Category B	7700	Upload Photo
Corehouse Conservatory And Flower Garden Walls, Gatepiers And Gates				55°39′17″N 3°46′53″W	Category B	51595	Upload Photo
Corehouse Stable Court Including Gatepiers And Boundary Wall				55°39′10″N 3°46′57″W	Category B	51596	Upload Photo
Corehouse, Mausoleum				55°39′23″N 3°46′59″W	Category C(S)	7682	Upload Photo
Harperfield				55°38′17″N 3°45′42″W	Category B	7690	Upload Photo
Stonebyres Coach House And Adjoining Buildings				55°40′20″N 3°50′42″W	Category B	7697	Upload Photo
Corehouse Stove House (Or Vinery)				55°39′19″N 3°46′54″W	Category C(S)	51597	Upload Photo
185 New Trows Road, Birkwood, West Lodge				55°38′01″N 3°53′35″W	Category B	11725	Upload Photo
Abbeygreen Road, Birkwood, Driveway Bridge Over River Nethan				55°38′03″N 3°53′11″W	Category B	11727	Upload Photo
Birkwood, Walled Garden				55°37′59″N 3°53′08″W	Category B	11728	Upload Photo
Corehouse				55°39′17″N 3°46′41″W	Category A	7679	Upload another image
No. 1 Braidwood Road, Crossford				55°41′52″N 3°52′04″W	Category B	7685	Upload Photo
Lesmahagow Village, Milton Bridge, A74				55°38′40″N 3°53′07″W	Category B	7702	Upload Photo

== Key ==
The scheme for classifying buildings in Scotland is:

- Category A: "buildings of national or international importance, either architectural or historic; or fine, little-altered examples of some particular period, style or building type."
- Category B: "buildings of regional or more than local importance; or major examples of some particular period, style or building type, which may have been altered."
- Category C: "buildings of local importance; lesser examples of any period, style, or building type, as originally constructed or moderately altered; and simple traditional buildings which group well with other listed buildings."

In March 2016 there were 47,288 listed buildings in Scotland. Of these, 8% were Category A, and 50% were Category B, with the remaining 42% being Category C.
