= List of listed buildings in Bothwell, South Lanarkshire =

This is a list of listed buildings in the parish of Bothwell (also including Uddingston) in South Lanarkshire, Scotland.

== List ==
Name	Location	Date Listed	Grid Ref. (Note: Sometimes known as OSGB36, the grid reference (where provided) is based on the British national grid reference system used by the Ordnance Survey. • "Guide to National Grid". Ordnance Survey. • "Get-a-map". Ordnance Survey.)	Geo-coordinates	Notes	LB Number (Note: Historic Environment Scotland assign a unique alphanumeric identifier to each designated site in Scotland, for listed buildings this always begins with "LB", for example "LB12345".)	Image
Bothwell, 29 Hamilton Road/ 1 Old Mill Road, Including Gatepiers And Boundary Walls				55°48′00″N 4°03′53″W	Category B	45074	Upload Photo
Bothwell, 6 Manse Avenue				55°48′21″N 4°04′14″W	Category C(S)	45078	Upload Photo
Bothwell, 4 And 4A Mill Road, Including Gatepiers And Boundary Walls				55°48′05″N 4°04′17″W	Category B	45084	Upload Photo
Uddingston, 20 Douglas Gardens, Including Gatepiers, Boundary Walls And Summerhouse				55°48′57″N 4°04′39″W	Category B	45097	Upload Photo
Uddingston, 1-9 Old Glasgow Road, (Odd Nos), (Incorporating Police Station) Including Gatepiers, Boundary Walls And Railings				55°49′02″N 4°04′56″W	Category C(S)	45103	Upload Photo
Uddingston, Watson Street, Muiredge Primary School, Including Boundary Walls, Gatepiers, Railings And Headmaster's House				55°49′14″N 4°04′36″W	Category B	45105	Upload Photo
Uddingston, 2, 6 And 8 Old Glasgow Road				55°49′06″N 4°04′57″W	Category C(S)	6622	Upload Photo
Bothwell, Main Street, St Bride's Collegiate Church, (Church Of Scotland), Including Graveyard, Boundary Walls, Gatepiers And Gates				55°48′12″N 4°04′03″W	Category A	5134	Upload another image See more images
Bothwell, Bothwell Bridge				55°47′45″N 4°03′29″W	Category A	5138	Upload another image See more images
Bothwell, Blantyre Mill Road, Elmwood Lodge				55°48′10″N 4°04′28″W	Category C(S)	5144	Upload Photo
Uddingston, 64-66 Old Glasgow Road, (Even Nos), Including Outbuilding				55°49′12″N 4°05′09″W	Category B	5148	Upload Photo
Uddingston, Greyfriars Road, Greyfriars Including Gatepiers, Quadrant Walls And Walled Garden				55°49′57″N 4°06′29″W	Category B	5150	Upload Photo
Bothwell, 13A And 13B Blantyre Mill Road Including Gatepiers And Boundary Walls				55°48′08″N 4°04′19″W	Category C(S)	45071	Upload Photo
Bothwell, 27 Hamilton Road, The Cricklewood, Public House, Including Boundary Walls				55°47′59″N 4°03′52″W	Category C(S)	45073	Upload Photo
Bothwell, 6 Orchard Avenue, (Formerly 8 Hamilton Road), Including Gatepiers And Boundary Walls				55°47′57″N 4°03′47″W	Category C(S)	45076	Upload Photo
Uddingston, 21 Glasgow Road, Including Gatepiers And Boundary Walls And Outbuilding To Rear				55°49′37″N 4°05′21″W	Category C(S)	45099	Upload Photo
Bothwell, Old Bothwell Road, Covenanters Memorial Including Boundary Walls And Railings				55°47′48″N 4°03′30″W	Category B	5139	Upload another image
Bothwell, Hamilton Road, Old Bothwell Primary School, Including Detached Dining Hall, Gatepiers, Boundary Walls And Railings				55°48′07″N 4°03′54″W	Category B	5154	Upload Photo
Bothwell, 4 Hamilton Road, Including Boundary Walls				55°47′56″N 4°03′44″W	Category C(S)	45075	Upload Photo
Bothwell, 46 Main Street, St Bride's Church Lodge				55°48′12″N 4°04′07″W	Category B	45081	Upload Photo
Bothwell, 28 Silverwells Crescent, Douglas Lodge, Including Boundary Walls And Gatepiers				55°47′58″N 4°04′22″W	Category C(S)	45090	Upload Photo
Uddingston, 2 Holmwood Avenue Including Gatepiers And Boundary Walls And Outbuilding				55°49′30″N 4°04′54″W	Category C(S)	45100	Upload Photo
Uddingston, 7-25 (Odd Nos), Main Street And 4 Bellshill Road, Royal Buildings				55°49′05″N 4°04′56″W	Category B	6621	Upload Photo
Bothwell, 24 Fairfield Place, Fairfield House, Including Boundary Walls And Gatepiers, Garden Walls, Gatepiers And Gates				55°48′14″N 4°03′46″W	Category B	5142	Upload Photo
Bothwell, 2 Main Street, Library, Formerly The Donald Institute, Including Boundary Walls, Gatepiers, Gates And Railings				55°48′08″N 4°03′57″W	Category C(S)	5155	Upload another image See more images
Bothwell, 15-17 (Odd Nos) Langside Road, Including Boundary Wall And Gatepiers				55°48′00″N 4°03′45″W	Category C(S)	45077	Upload Photo
Bothwell, 11 Silverwells Crescent, Hollybank, Including Boundary Walls And Gatepiers				55°48′01″N 4°04′00″W	Category C(S)	45087	Upload Photo
Uddingston Bowling And Tennis Club, Central Block Of Clubhouse Only				55°49′07″N 4°05′06″W	Category C(S)	45095	Upload Photo
Uddingston, Bothwell Road, Bothwell Castle Gatehouse Including Screen Walls, Quadrant Walls And Piers				55°48′46″N 4°04′47″W	Category B	5137	Upload Photo
Bothwell, Green Street, Sweethope House				55°48′16″N 4°03′46″W	Category B	5141	Upload Photo
Uddingston, 60 Old Glasgow Road, Easter Cottage, Including Boundary Walls				55°49′11″N 4°05′06″W	Category C(S)	5146	Upload Photo
Uddingston, 62 Old Glasgow Road, Easter Farm, Including Flanking Outbuildings, Gatepiers, Boundary Walls And Railings				55°49′12″N 4°05′07″W	Category B	5147	Upload Photo
Bothwell, Laighlands Road, Criagievar And Gleneden Including Entrance Lampstands				55°48′09″N 4°03′40″W	Category A	5151	Upload Photo
Bothwell 73-77 Main Street (Odd Nos), Clydesdale Bank				55°48′11″N 4°04′08″W	Category B	45079	Upload Photo
Bothwell, 2 Mill Road, Including Gatepiers And Boundary Walls				55°48′07″N 4°04′17″W	Category C(S)	45083	Upload Photo
Bothwell, 3 And 3A Silverwells Crescent, Including Gatepiers And Boundary Walls				55°48′01″N 4°03′55″W	Category C(S)	45086	Upload Photo
Bothwell, 18-20 (Even Nos), Silverwells Crescent, Haxton House, Including Boundary Walls				55°47′59″N 4°04′10″W	Category C(S)	45088	Upload Photo
Uddingston, Blantyre Farm Road And Old Glasgow Road, Haughhead Bridge Tollhouse, Clydeneuk Cottage				55°49′46″N 4°05′57″W	Category C(S)	45093	Upload Photo
Uddingston, 15 Glasgow Road, Including Gatepiers, Boundary Walls, Gates And Railings				55°49′35″N 4°05′19″W	Category C(S)	45098	Upload Photo
Uddingston, 1 Main Street, Uddingston Library Including Boundary Walls Railings And Gates				55°49′03″N 4°04′55″W	Category C(S)	45101	Upload Photo
Uddingston, Old Glasgow Road And Castle Avenue, Uddingston Old Parish Church, (Church Of Scotland), Including Hall, Boundary Walls, Gatepiers And Gates				55°49′04″N 4°04′59″W	Category B	45102	Upload another image
Bothwell, Bothwell Parish Church, Joanna Baillie Monument				55°48′11″N 4°04′06″W	Category A	5135	Upload another image
Bothwell, Bothwell Castle				55°48′34″N 4°05′40″W	Category A	5136	Upload another image
Bothwell, The Glebe, Sweethope Farm, Formerly Back Sweethope				55°48′22″N 4°03′52″W	Category B	5152	Upload Photo
Uddingston, Uddingston Viaduct				55°49′24″N 4°05′45″W	Category A	5153	Upload another image
Bothwell, Blantyre Mill Road, Entrance To Elmwood Mansion, Including Gate Piers, Gates, Boundary Walls And Railings				55°48′09″N 4°04′28″W	Category B	88	Upload Photo
Uddingston, 3 Glasgow Road, Primrose Bank, Including Gatepiers And Boundary Walls				55°49′28″N 4°05′13″W	Category C(S)	45091	Upload Photo
Uddingston, Blantyre Farm Road, Haughhead Bridge				55°49′46″N 4°06′03″W	Category B	45092	Upload another image See more images
Uddingston, Old Mill Road, The Rowan Tree Inn				55°49′11″N 4°04′51″W	Category B	6453	Upload Photo
Bothwell, 1-3 Main Street (Odd Nos), Camphill Vaults Public House				55°48′07″N 4°03′58″W	Category C(S)	6375	Upload Photo
Bothwell Castle Park, The Poultry				55°48′52″N 4°05′25″W	Category B	5149	Upload Photo
Bothwell, Main Street, Russell Memorial Hall, Including Gatepiers, Boundary Walls And Railings				55°48′13″N 4°04′06″W	Category C(S)	47151	Upload Photo
Bothwell, 60 Main Street, Bothwell Evangelical Church, Including Boundary Walls, Gatepiers, Gates And Railings				55°48′17″N 4°04′12″W	Category B	45082	Upload Photo
Bothwell, 3 Orchard Avenue, Anchorage House, Including Gatepiers				55°47′59″N 4°03′47″W	Category C(S)	45085	Upload Photo
Uddingston, Bowling And Tennis Club, Bowling Pavilion				55°49′08″N 4°05′04″W	Category C(S)	45094	Upload Photo
Uddingston, Church Street And Main Street, Park United Free Church Of Scotland, Including Adjoining Church Hall Boundary Walls, Gatepiers And Railings				55°49′12″N 4°04′59″W	Category B	45096	Upload Photo
Bothwell, 7 Fairyknowe Gardens, Mansfield, Including Gatepiers, Boundary Walls And Outbuilding				55°48′14″N 4°03′58″W	Category B	45072	Upload Photo
Bothwell, 8-10 (Even Nos), Main Street, Including Gatepiers And Boundary Walls				55°48′09″N 4°04′00″W	Category C(S)	45080	Upload Photo
Bothwell, 26 Silverwells Crescent, Including Gatepiers, Gates And Boundary Walls				55°47′59″N 4°04′20″W	Category C(S)	45089	Upload Photo
Uddingston, Station Road, Uddingston Grammar School, (Original Core Only), Including Gatepiers, Boundary Walls And Railings				55°49′23″N 4°05′12″W	Category C(S)	45104	Upload Photo
Bothwell, Bothwell Park Road, Bothwell Park House				55°48′33″N 4°03′22″W	Category B	5140	Upload Photo
Bothwell, 20 And 22 Green Street, Greenbank				55°48′12″N 4°03′49″W	Category B	5143	Upload Photo
Bothwell, 1-8 (Inclusive Nos) Blantyre Mill Road, Elmwood Mansion				55°48′11″N 4°04′25″W	Category B	5145	Upload Photo

== Key ==
The scheme for classifying buildings in Scotland is:

- Category A: "buildings of national or international importance, either architectural or historic; or fine, little-altered examples of some particular period, style or building type."
- Category B: "buildings of regional or more than local importance; or major examples of some particular period, style or building type, which may have been altered."
- Category C: "buildings of local importance; lesser examples of any period, style, or building type, as originally constructed or moderately altered; and simple traditional buildings which group well with other listed buildings."

In March 2016 there were 47,288 listed buildings in Scotland. Of these, 8% were Category A, and 50% were Category B, with the remaining 42% being Category C.
