= List of listed buildings in Libberton, South Lanarkshire =

This is a list of listed buildings in the parish of Libberton in South Lanarkshire, Scotland.

== List ==
Name	Location	Date listed	Geo-coordinates	Notes	Category	LB number	Image
Parish Church And Graveyard			55°40′07″N 3°36′20″W		B	7374	Upload Photo
Quothquhan Lodge			55°39′20″N 3°36′11″W		B	7349	Upload Photo
Dovecot, Shieldhill			55°38′48″N 3°34′56″W		B	7378	Upload Photo
Quothquan Church			55°38′19″N 3°36′07″W		B	7376	Upload Photo
Shieldhill, Stable Block			55°38′51″N 3°34′48″W		B	13150	Upload Photo
Quothquhan, Shieldhill Hall			55°38′25″N 3°35′51″W		C(S)	12995	Upload Photo
Quothquhan Lodge Gatelodge And Gatepiers			55°39′26″N 3°35′51″W		B	7350	Upload Photo
Ogs Castle			55°41′07″N 3°32′36″W		B	7379	Upload Photo
Shieldhill			55°38′50″N 3°34′49″W		B	7377	Upload Photo
Quothquhan Lodge, Kennel			55°39′26″N 3°35′51″W		B	7347	Upload Photo
Libberton House			55°40′08″N 3°36′17″W		B	7375	Upload Photo
K6 Telephone Kiosk On B7106 Near Libberton			55°40′12″N 3°36′28″W		B	7380	Upload Photo
Netherton House			55°36′48″N 3°34′02″W		B	50130	Upload Photo

== Key ==
The scheme for classifying buildings in Scotland is:

- Category A: "buildings of national or international importance, either architectural or historic; or fine, little-altered examples of some particular period, style or building type."
- Category B: "buildings of regional or more than local importance; or major examples of some particular period, style or building type, which may have been altered."
- Category C: "buildings of local importance; lesser examples of any period, style, or building type, as originally constructed or moderately altered; and simple traditional buildings which group well with other listed buildings."

In March 2016 there were 47,288 listed buildings in Scotland. Of these, 8% were Category A, and 50% were Category B, with the remaining 42% being Category C.
