= List of listed buildings in Carmichael, South Lanarkshire =

This is a list of listed buildings in the parish of Carmichael in South Lanarkshire, Scotland.

== List ==
Name	Location	Date Listed	Grid Ref. (Note: Sometimes known as OSGB36, the grid reference (where provided) is based on the British national grid reference system used by the Ordnance Survey. • "Guide to National Grid". Ordnance Survey. • "Get-a-map". Ordnance Survey.)	Geo-coordinates	Notes	LB Number (Note: Historic Environment Scotland assign a unique alphanumeric identifier to each designated site in Scotland, for listed buildings this always begins with "LB", for example "LB12345".)	Image
Mausoleum				55°37′07″N 3°40′30″W	Category B	721	Upload Photo
Monument, Carmichael Hill				55°38′12″N 3°41′47″W	Category B	719	Upload Photo
The Toll House Hynford Bridge				55°39′14″N 3°43′30″W	Category C(S)	722	Upload Photo
Parish Church And Graveyard				55°37′37″N 3°42′43″W	Category B	734	Upload Photo
Wellhead				55°38′01″N 3°41′34″W	Category B	735	Upload Photo
Carmichael Mill				55°39′21″N 3°42′55″W	Category B	6584	Upload Photo
Twin Cottages				55°38′03″N 3°41′33″W	Category B	740	Upload Photo
Carmichael House				55°37′59″N 3°41′27″W	Category B	44568	Upload Photo
Butlers Cottage				55°37′58″N 3°41′36″W	Category B	717	Upload Photo
West Mains				55°37′52″N 3°41′51″W	Category B	738	Upload Photo
Dovecot				55°37′52″N 3°41′50″W	Category B	737	Upload Photo
Eastend House And Steading				55°37′09″N 3°40′15″W	Category B	720	Upload Photo
Tomb, Kirkhill				55°38′04″N 3°40′57″W	Category B	736	Upload Photo
East Mains				55°38′06″N 3°41′10″W	Category B	739	Upload Photo
Laundry Cottage				55°38′02″N 3°41′33″W	Category B	718	Upload Photo

== Key ==
The scheme for classifying buildings in Scotland is:

- Category A: "buildings of national or international importance, either architectural or historic; or fine, little-altered examples of some particular period, style or building type."
- Category B: "buildings of regional or more than local importance; or major examples of some particular period, style or building type, which may have been altered."
- Category C: "buildings of local importance; lesser examples of any period, style, or building type, as originally constructed or moderately altered; and simple traditional buildings which group well with other listed buildings."

In March 2016 there were 47,288 listed buildings in Scotland. Of these, 8% were Category A, and 50% were Category B, with the remaining 42% being Category C.
