= List of listed buildings in Dunsyre, South Lanarkshire =

This is a list of listed buildings in the parish of Dunsyre in South Lanarkshire, Scotland.

== List ==
Name	Location	Date Listed	Grid Ref. (Note: Sometimes known as OSGB36, the grid reference (where provided) is based on the British national grid reference system used by the Ordnance Survey. • "Guide to National Grid". Ordnance Survey. • "Get-a-map". Ordnance Survey.)	Geo-coordinates	Notes	LB Number (Note: Historic Environment Scotland assign a unique alphanumeric identifier to each designated site in Scotland, for listed buildings this always begins with "LB", for example "LB12345".)	Image
Parish Church, And Graveyard				55°43′03″N 3°28′45″W	Category B	641	Upload Photo
Covenanter's Grave, Black Law				55°45′16″N 3°28′11″W	Category B	643	Upload Photo
Westhall Farm, Castle Ruin				55°42′36″N 3°30′58″W	Category C(S)	5097	Upload Photo
Blackhill Farm Near Medwinhead				55°44′55″N 3°27′13″W	Category B	644	Upload Photo
Medwynbank Sawmill, Garvald Estate, Dolphinton, Dunsyre				55°43′59″N 3°26′15″W	Category B	645	Upload Photo
Manse				55°43′05″N 3°28′49″W	Category C(S)	642	Upload Photo

== Key ==
The scheme for classifying buildings in Scotland is:

- Category A: "buildings of national or international importance, either architectural or historic; or fine, little-altered examples of some particular period, style or building type."
- Category B: "buildings of regional or more than local importance; or major examples of some particular period, style or building type, which may have been altered."
- Category C: "buildings of local importance; lesser examples of any period, style, or building type, as originally constructed or moderately altered; and simple traditional buildings which group well with other listed buildings."

In March 2016 there were 47,288 listed buildings in Scotland. Of these, 8% were Category A, and 50% were Category B, with the remaining 42% being Category C.
