= List of listed buildings in Culter, South Lanarkshire =

This is a list of listed buildings in the parish of Culter in South Lanarkshire, Scotland.

== List ==
Name	Location	Date Listed	Grid Ref. (Note: Sometimes known as OSGB36, the grid reference (where provided) is based on the British national grid reference system used by the Ordnance Survey. • "Guide to National Grid". Ordnance Survey. • "Get-a-map". Ordnance Survey.)	Geo-coordinates	Notes	LB Number (Note: Historic Environment Scotland assign a unique alphanumeric identifier to each designated site in Scotland, for listed buildings this always begins with "LB", for example "LB12345".)	Image
Cornhill House, Sunnyside Cottage				55°35′48″N 3°33′31″W	Category C(S)	1406	Upload Photo
Culter House				55°35′32″N 3°32′58″W	Category B	1419	Upload Photo
The Brae				55°35′44″N 3°33′04″W	Category C(S)	1421	Upload Photo
Townfoot Cottages (4 Dwellings)				55°35′42″N 3°33′05″W	Category C(S)	1422	Upload Photo
Mill				55°35′21″N 3°33′02″W	Category B	1427	Upload Photo
Coulter, Former Free Church				55°36′10″N 3°32′42″W	Category B	6665	Upload Photo
Cornhill House, Court Of Offices				55°36′03″N 3°33′34″W	Category B	6455	Upload Photo
Cornhill Farmhouse And Steading				55°36′09″N 3°33′12″W	Category B	6456	Upload Photo
Parish Church And Graveyard				55°35′29″N 3°32′37″W	Category B	1418	Upload Photo
Nos. 1/10 The Village				55°35′23″N 3°33′02″W	Category B	1424	Upload Photo
Coulter, Kirkwood Old Manse (Former Culter Free Church Manse) Including Stables And Former Beadle's Cottage				55°36′11″N 3°32′43″W	Category B	6666	Upload Photo
Craig Cottage				55°35′32″N 3°33′09″W	Category B	4839	Upload Photo
Cornhill House, North Lodge, Gates And Enclosing Walls At Wolfclyde Bridge				55°36′27″N 3°33′28″W	Category B	1407	Upload Photo
Coulter Square (5 Dwellings)				55°35′36″N 3°33′12″W	Category B	1423	Upload Photo
Burnside Cottages (2 Dwellings)				55°35′36″N 3°33′15″W	Category B	1425	Upload Photo
Coulter Mains				55°35′42″N 3°33′57″W	Category B	1429	Upload Photo
Coulter Village Culter Library And Attached Cottage				55°35′22″N 3°33′03″W	Category B	1408	Upload Photo
Post Office				55°35′21″N 3°33′01″W	Category C(S)	1426	Upload Photo
Mill Cottage				55°35′20″N 3°33′03″W	Category C(S)	1428	Upload Photo
Cornhill House				55°36′04″N 3°33′36″W	Category B	1430	Upload Photo
Lodge, Culter House, Including Gate Piers And Park Wall				55°35′31″N 3°33′05″W	Category B	1420	Upload Photo
Chapelhill				55°35′31″N 3°33′09″W	Category C(S)	6454	Upload Photo

== Key ==
The scheme for classifying buildings in Scotland is:

- Category A: "buildings of national or international importance, either architectural or historic; or fine, little-altered examples of some particular period, style or building type."
- Category B: "buildings of regional or more than local importance; or major examples of some particular period, style or building type, which may have been altered."
- Category C: "buildings of local importance; lesser examples of any period, style, or building type, as originally constructed or moderately altered; and simple traditional buildings which group well with other listed buildings."

In March 2016 there were 47,288 listed buildings in Scotland. Of these, 8% were Category A, and 50% were Category B, with the remaining 42% being Category C.
