= List of listed buildings in Douglas, South Lanarkshire =

This is a list of listed buildings in the parish of Douglas in South Lanarkshire, Scotland.

== List ==
Name	Location	Date Listed	Grid Ref. (Note: Sometimes known as OSGB36, the grid reference (where provided) is based on the British national grid reference system used by the Ordnance Survey. • "Guide to National Grid". Ordnance Survey. • "Get-a-map". Ordnance Survey.)	Geo-coordinates	Notes	LB Number (Note: Historic Environment Scotland assign a unique alphanumeric identifier to each designated site in Scotland, for listed buildings this always begins with "LB", for example "LB12345".)	Image
Douglas Village 2, 4 Clyde Road				55°33′28″N 3°50′48″W	Category C(S)	1455	Upload Photo
Douglas Village Douglas Parish Church				55°33′31″N 3°50′40″W	Category B	1456	Upload Photo
Douglas Village 63, 65 Main Street				55°33′29″N 3°50′50″W	Category C(S)	1459	Upload Photo
Douglas Village 67, 69 Main Street				55°33′29″N 3°50′50″W	Category C(S)	1460	Upload Photo
Douglas Village 62, 64, 66 Main Street				55°33′28″N 3°50′49″W	Category C(S)	1486	Upload Photo
Douglas Village 74 Main Street Sun Inn				55°33′29″N 3°50′49″W	Category B	1487	Upload Photo
Douglas Village 7 The Loaning				55°33′29″N 3°50′45″W	Category C(S)	1492	Upload Photo
42 Ayr Road, Braehead (Also Known As 3 Braehead)				55°33′26″N 3°50′41″W	Category C(S)	50884	Upload Photo
Douglas Village 38 Ayr Road Earlston				55°33′27″N 3°50′39″W	Category B	1452	Upload Photo
Douglas Village 5 The Loaning				55°33′29″N 3°50′46″W	Category C(S)	1491	Upload Photo
Happendon Lodge				55°34′57″N 3°49′18″W	Category B	1494	Upload Photo
Old Poneil Bridge				55°35′48″N 3°49′18″W	Category B	1497	Upload Photo
Douglas Village Ayr Road Springhill				55°33′13″N 3°50′56″W	Category B	1451	Upload Photo
Douglas Village Bell's Wynd, Douglas Heritage Museum (Former St Sophia's Episcopal Church)				55°33′30″N 3°50′52″W	Category B	1454	Upload Photo
Douglas Village Earl Of Angus' Monument				55°33′30″N 3°50′57″W	Category A	1457	Upload another image
Parkhall				55°34′47″N 3°48′28″W	Category C(S)	1461	Upload Photo
Wolfcrooks Bridge				55°36′19″N 3°48′06″W	Category B	1464	Upload Photo
Douglas Village 56, 58, 60 Main Street				55°33′28″N 3°50′50″W	Category C(S)	1485	Upload Photo
Millbank				55°34′37″N 3°48′31″W	Category C(S)	1495	Upload Photo
Castle Mains				55°34′29″N 3°48′33″W	Category B	1448	Upload Photo
New Mains				55°33′45″N 3°49′41″W	Category B	1496	Upload Photo
81 And 83 Ayr Road				55°33′20″N 3°50′52″W	Category C(S)	50883	Upload Photo
Douglas Estate Douglas Castle				55°33′59″N 3°50′14″W	Category C(S)	1449	Upload Photo
Douglas Village 61 Main Street				55°33′28″N 3°50′51″W	Category C(S)	1458	Upload Photo
Douglas Village 87, 89 Main Street				55°33′32″N 3°50′45″W	Category C(S)	1484	Upload Photo
Douglas Village 84 Main Street				55°33′29″N 3°50′48″W	Category C(S)	1488	Upload Photo
Douglas Village 2, 4 The Loaning				55°33′28″N 3°50′46″W	Category C(S)	1493	Upload Photo
Douglas Village Ayr Road Douglas Arms Hotel				55°33′21″N 3°50′53″W	Category B	1453	Upload Photo
Douglas Village Mansefield				55°33′17″N 3°50′47″W	Category B	1489	Upload Photo
Douglas Estate North Bridge Over Burnhouse Burn				55°33′35″N 3°50′44″W	Category C(S)	1450	Upload Photo
Uddington Village Ptarmigan Cottage				55°34′48″N 3°48′19″W	Category C(S)	1462	Upload Photo
Uddington Village, Konisberg				55°34′48″N 3°48′19″W	Category B	1463	Upload Photo
Douglas Village St Bride's Chapel & Churchyard Walls				55°33′30″N 3°50′50″W	Category A	1490	Upload another image See more images

== Key ==
The scheme for classifying buildings in Scotland is:

- Category A: "buildings of national or international importance, either architectural or historic; or fine, little-altered examples of some particular period, style or building type."
- Category B: "buildings of regional or more than local importance; or major examples of some particular period, style or building type, which may have been altered."
- Category C: "buildings of local importance; lesser examples of any period, style, or building type, as originally constructed or moderately altered; and simple traditional buildings which group well with other listed buildings."

In March 2016 there were 47,288 listed buildings in Scotland. Of these, 8% were Category A, and 50% were Category B, with the remaining 42% being Category C.
