= List of listed buildings in Wiston And Roberton, South Lanarkshire =

This is a list of listed buildings in the parish of Wiston And Roberton in South Lanarkshire, Scotland.

== List ==
Name	Location	Date Listed	Grid Ref. (Note: Sometimes known as OSGB36, the grid reference (where provided) is based on the British national grid reference system used by the Ordnance Survey. • "Guide to National Grid". Ordnance Survey. • "Get-a-map". Ordnance Survey.)	Geo-coordinates	Notes	LB Number (Note: Historic Environment Scotland assign a unique alphanumeric identifier to each designated site in Scotland, for listed buildings this always begins with "LB", for example "LB12345".)	Image
Stable Range Including Saw Mill And Dovecot				55°33′18″N 3°38′37″W	Category B	14195	Upload Photo
Old Bridge, Roberton				55°32′24″N 3°40′29″W	Category B	14198	Upload Photo
Parish Church Wiston, And Graveyard				55°34′06″N 3°38′55″W	Category C(S)	19675	Upload Photo
Hardington House				55°33′18″N 3°38′33″W	Category B	14194	Upload Photo
Clyde's Bridge				55°31′21″N 3°40′43″W	Category B	14200	Upload Photo
Wiston Lodge, Stable Court				55°34′24″N 3°39′11″W	Category B	19622	Upload Photo
Old Corn Mill, Roberton				55°32′25″N 3°40′31″W	Category C(S)	14197	Upload Photo
The Cottage, Roberton				55°32′25″N 3°40′28″W	Category B	14199	Upload Photo
Manse				55°34′08″N 3°38′51″W	Category C(S)	14193	Upload Photo
Wiston Lodge, Including Clachan Cottage, Kennels Cottage And Shieling Cottage				55°34′21″N 3°39′17″W	Category B	19621	Upload Photo
Roberton Church				55°32′27″N 3°40′22″W	Category B	14196	Upload Photo

== Key ==
The scheme for classifying buildings in Scotland is:

- Category A: "buildings of national or international importance, either architectural or historic; or fine, little-altered examples of some particular period, style or building type."
- Category B: "buildings of regional or more than local importance; or major examples of some particular period, style or building type, which may have been altered."
- Category C: "buildings of local importance; lesser examples of any period, style, or building type, as originally constructed or moderately altered; and simple traditional buildings which group well with other listed buildings."

In March 2016 there were 47,288 listed buildings in Scotland. Of these, 8% were Category A, and 50% were Category B, with the remaining 42% being Category C.
