= List of listed buildings in Symington, South Lanarkshire =

This is a list of listed buildings in the parish of Symington in South Lanarkshire, Scotland.

== List ==
Name	Location	Date Listed	Grid Ref. (Note: Sometimes known as OSGB36, the grid reference (where provided) is based on the British national grid reference system used by the Ordnance Survey. • "Guide to National Grid". Ordnance Survey. • "Get-a-map". Ordnance Survey.)	Geo-coordinates	Notes	LB Number (Note: Historic Environment Scotland assign a unique alphanumeric identifier to each designated site in Scotland, for listed buildings this always begins with "LB", for example "LB12345".)	Image
The Old Manse				55°36′02″N 3°35′30″W	Category C(S)	14170	Upload Photo
Watchhouse And Church Yard				55°35′58″N 3°35′26″W	Category B	14169	Upload Photo
The Round House				55°35′54″N 3°34′24″W	Category B	14171	Upload Photo
Parish Church				55°35′59″N 3°35′26″W	Category B	14168	Upload Photo
Symington House				55°36′01″N 3°34′23″W	Category A	19673	Upload another image
Symington House Garage Cottage				55°35′55″N 3°34′24″W	Category B	19224	Upload Photo
Fatlips Castle				55°35′21″N 3°38′18″W	Category B	14172	Upload Photo
Symington House Lodge Gatepiers And Gates				55°35′55″N 3°34′23″W	Category B	19223	Upload Photo

== Key ==
The scheme for classifying buildings in Scotland is:

- Category A: "buildings of national or international importance, either architectural or historic; or fine, little-altered examples of some particular period, style or building type."
- Category B: "buildings of regional or more than local importance; or major examples of some particular period, style or building type, which may have been altered."
- Category C: "buildings of local importance; lesser examples of any period, style, or building type, as originally constructed or moderately altered; and simple traditional buildings which group well with other listed buildings."

In March 2016 there were 47,288 listed buildings in Scotland. Of these, 8% were Category A, and 50% were Category B, with the remaining 42% being Category C.
