= List of listed buildings in Carluke, South Lanarkshire =

This is a list of listed buildings in the parish of Carluke in South Lanarkshire, Scotland.

== List ==
Name	Location	Date listed	Grid ref. (Note: Sometimes known as OSGB36, the grid reference (where provided) is based on the British national grid reference system used by the Ordnance Survey. • "Guide to National Grid". Ordnance Survey. • "Get-a-map". Ordnance Survey.)	Geo-coordinates	Notes	LB number (Note: Historic Environment Scotland assign a unique alphanumeric identifier to each designated site in Scotland, for listed buildings this always begins with "LB", for example "LB12345".)	Image
Pavilion, Orchard House				55°42′18″N 3°51′58″W	Category B	725	Upload Photo
Milton Lockhart Bridge And Lodge				55°43′08″N 3°53′40″W	Category B	727	Upload Photo
Boghall Road, Birkfield				55°43′35″N 3°48′43″W	Category B	6459	Upload Photo
Orchard House				55°42′15″N 3°51′56″W	Category C(S)	724	Upload Photo
Langshaw				55°43′17″N 3°49′21″W	Category B	728	Upload Photo
Carluke, 35 Chapel Street				55°44′08″N 3°50′11″W	Category C(S)	6460	Upload Photo
High Mill Chapel Street				55°44′12″N 3°50′03″W	Category A	726	Upload another image
Dovecot, Waygateshaw				55°42′59″N 3°52′27″W	Category B	744	Upload Photo
Tower Of Hallbar				55°42′13″N 3°50′55″W	Category A	723	Upload Photo
Waygateshaw				55°42′55″N 3°52′25″W	Category B	743	Upload Photo
Crossford, Orchard Farm				55°42′23″N 3°51′53″W	Category B	44613	Upload Photo
St Andrew's Parish Church, Mount Stewart Street				55°44′12″N 3°50′37″W	Category B	741	Upload Photo
St. Lukes Church And Churchyard				55°44′03″N 3°50′09″W	Category B	742	Upload Photo

== Key ==
The scheme for classifying buildings in Scotland is:

- Category A: "buildings of national or international importance, either architectural or historic; or fine, little-altered examples of some particular period, style or building type."
- Category B: "buildings of regional or more than local importance; or major examples of some particular period, style or building type, which may have been altered."
- Category C: "buildings of local importance; lesser examples of any period, style, or building type, as originally constructed or moderately altered; and simple traditional buildings which group well with other listed buildings."

In March 2016 there were 47,288 listed buildings in Scotland. Of these, 8% were Category A, and 50% were Category B, with the remaining 42% being Category C.
