= List of listed buildings in Glassford, South Lanarkshire =

This is a list of listed buildings in the parish of Glassford in South Lanarkshire, Scotland.

== List ==
| Name | Location | Date Listed | Grid Ref. (Note: Sometimes known as OSGB36, the grid reference (where provided) is based on the British national grid reference system used by the Ordnance Survey. • "Guide to National Grid". Ordnance Survey. • "Get-a-map". Ordnance Survey.) | Geo-coordinates | Notes | LB Number (Note: Historic Environment Scotland assign a unique alphanumeric identifier to each designated site in Scotland, for listed buildings this always begins with "LB", for example "LB12345".) | Image |
|---|---|---|---|---|---|---|---|
| Westquarter House | | | | 55°41′46″N 4°02′19″W | Category C(S) | 7657 | Upload Photo |
| Muirburn Road, 1, 2, 3, 4 Mansfield Court, Including Former Stables, Boundary Walls And Gatepiers | | | | 55°42′00″N 4°01′13″W | Category C(S) | 7655 | Upload Photo |
| Crutherland | | | | 55°44′22″N 4°08′49″W | Category B | 13666 | Upload Photo |
| Glassford, 8 Jackson Street | | | | 55°41′59″N 4°01′40″W | Category C(S) | 13343 | Upload Photo |
| Parish Church, And Graveyard | | | | 55°42′00″N 4°01′43″W | Category B | 7653 | Upload Photo |
| Ruin Of Old Church And Graveyard | | | | 55°42′00″N 4°01′08″W | Category B | 7654 | Upload Photo |
| Hallhill House | | | | 55°42′02″N 4°01′25″W | Category B | 7656 | Upload Photo |
| Avonholm | | | | 55°41′44″N 4°00′27″W | Category B | 13640 | Upload Photo |
| Lodge, Crutherland | | | | 55°44′16″N 4°09′12″W | Category B | 7658 | Upload Photo |

== Key ==
The scheme for classifying buildings in Scotland is:

- Category A: "buildings of national or international importance, either architectural or historic; or fine, little-altered examples of some particular period, style or building type."
- Category B: "buildings of regional or more than local importance; or major examples of some particular period, style or building type, which may have been altered."
- Category C: "buildings of local importance; lesser examples of any period, style, or building type, as originally constructed or moderately altered; and simple traditional buildings which group well with other listed buildings."

In March 2016 there were 47,288 listed buildings in Scotland. Of these, 8% were Category A, and 50% were Category B, with the remaining 42% being Category C.
