= List of listed buildings in Carnwath, South Lanarkshire =

This is a list of listed buildings in the parish of Carnwath in South Lanarkshire, Scotland.

== List ==
Name	Location	Date Listed	Grid Ref. (Note: Sometimes known as OSGB36, the grid reference (where provided) is based on the British national grid reference system used by the Ordnance Survey. • "Guide to National Grid". Ordnance Survey. • "Get-a-map". Ordnance Survey.)	Geo-coordinates	Notes	LB Number (Note: Historic Environment Scotland assign a unique alphanumeric identifier to each designated site in Scotland, for listed buildings this always begins with "LB", for example "LB12345".)	Image
Newbigging, Dunsyre Road, Thatched Building				55°41′54″N 3°34′03″W	Category C(S)	6457	Upload Photo
Smithy And Smithy Cottages, Newbigging				55°41′52″N 3°34′04″W	Category C(S)	699	Upload Photo
Auchengray Church				55°46′08″N 3°36′07″W	Category B	707	Upload Photo
Braehead Village, Braehead Church				55°44′15″N 3°40′11″W	Category B	674	Upload Photo
Old Collegiate Church, "St. Mary's Aisle", And Graveyard				55°42′01″N 3°37′55″W	Category A	692	Upload another image See more images
Nos. 74-78 Main Street				55°42′02″N 3°37′30″W	Category B	697	Upload Photo
Westshield				55°43′32″N 3°40′49″W	Category B	702	Upload Photo
Tomb, Scabhill				55°43′55″N 3°40′40″W	Category C(S)	704	Upload Photo
Mausoleum Near Fordmouth Bridge				55°44′23″N 3°37′43″W	Category C(S)	708	Upload Photo
Ampherlaw Farmhouse And Steading Including Boundary Walls And Gatepiers				55°44′27″N 3°36′52″W	Category C(S)	50150	Upload Photo
Carnwath Cross				55°42′01″N 3°37′33″W	Category A	694	Upload another image See more images
Estate Office				55°42′01″N 3°37′56″W	Category C(S)	696	Upload Photo
Eastshield				55°43′56″N 3°39′27″W	Category B	703	Upload Photo
Kersewell House, Walled Garden Including Pheasantry				55°42′29″N 3°34′47″W	Category B	676	Upload Photo
Carnwath, Garmonie (Former Carnwath Manse)				55°41′58″N 3°37′51″W	Category B	695	Upload Photo
New Bush Inn				55°42′03″N 3°37′26″W	Category B	698	Upload Photo
Cleuch House And Walled Garden				55°46′08″N 3°40′05″W	Category C(S)	709	Upload Photo
Newbigging, Market Cross				55°41′48″N 3°34′06″W	Category A	5093	Upload Photo
Ampherlaw House And Dovecot				55°44′24″N 3°36′49″W	Category B	706	Upload Photo
Dovecot Cleugh House				55°46′04″N 3°40′03″W	Category B	710	Upload Photo
Biggar Road, King George's Park, Carnwath Sports Pavilion				55°41′59″N 3°37′36″W	Category C(S)	51593	Upload Photo
Kersewell House				55°42′30″N 3°34′49″W	Category B	675	Upload Photo
Carnwath Parish Church				55°42′01″N 3°37′54″W	Category B	700	Upload another image See more images
Parish Church Hall				55°42′02″N 3°37′45″W	Category C(S)	693	Upload Photo
Couthalley Castle				55°42′58″N 3°38′21″W	Category B	701	Upload Photo
Pigeon Tower, Lawhead				55°46′13″N 3°33′19″W	Category C(S)	705	Upload Photo

== Key ==
The scheme for classifying buildings in Scotland is:

- Category A: "buildings of national or international importance, either architectural or historic; or fine, little-altered examples of some particular period, style or building type."
- Category B: "buildings of regional or more than local importance; or major examples of some particular period, style or building type, which may have been altered."
- Category C: "buildings of local importance; lesser examples of any period, style, or building type, as originally constructed or moderately altered; and simple traditional buildings which group well with other listed buildings."

In March 2016 there were 47,288 listed buildings in Scotland. Of these, 8% were Category A, and 50% were Category B, with the remaining 42% being Category C.
