= List of listed buildings in Blantyre, South Lanarkshire =

This is a list of listed buildings in the parish of Blantyre in South Lanarkshire, Scotland.

== List ==
| Name | Location | Date listed | Geo-coordinates | Notes | Category | LB number | Image |
|---|---|---|---|---|---|---|---|
| Bardykes | | | 55°47′55″N 4°06′27″W | | B | 5159 | Upload Photo |
| Blantyre, Mayberry Place, St Joseph's Presbytery | | | 55°47′44″N 4°05′41″W | | B | 50017 | Upload Photo |
| Glasgow Road, Livingstone Memorial Church Including Hall, Boundary Wall And Manse | | | 55°47′43″N 4°05′45″W | | B | 6589 | Upload another image See more images |
| Old Churchyard | | | 55°47′05″N 4°06′26″W | | B | 5157 | Upload Photo |
| Calderglen | | | 55°48′39″N 4°06′37″W | | B | 5161 | Upload Photo |
| Blantyre, Mayberry Place, St Joseph's Catholic Church Including Boundary Walls, Gatepiers And Railings | | | 55°47′42″N 4°05′43″W | | B | 50018 | Upload another image See more images |
| Parish Church | | | 55°47′04″N 4°06′28″W | | B | 5156 | Upload Photo |
| The Wages Office, Blantyre Mill | | | 55°48′07″N 4°04′57″W | | B | 5163 | Upload Photo |
| Shott House | | | 55°47′05″N 4°06′39″W | | B | 5158 | Upload Photo |
| Haughhead Bridge | | | 55°49′46″N 4°06′03″W | | B | 5165 | Upload another image See more images |
| Blantyre Priory | | | 55°48′35″N 4°05′53″W | | B | 5160 | Upload Photo |
| Mill House, Blantyre | | | 55°48′09″N 4°04′57″W | | B | 5164 | Upload Photo |
| Scottish National Memorial To David Livingstone | | | 55°48′08″N 4°05′00″W | | A | 5162 | Upload another image |
| Memorial Bridge | | | 55°48′07″N 4°04′54″W | | B | 89 | Upload Photo |

== Key ==
The scheme for classifying buildings in Scotland is:

- Category A: "buildings of national or international importance, either architectural or historic; or fine, little-altered examples of some particular period, style or building type."
- Category B: "buildings of regional or more than local importance; or major examples of some particular period, style or building type, which may have been altered."
- Category C: "buildings of local importance; lesser examples of any period, style, or building type, as originally constructed or moderately altered; and simple traditional buildings which group well with other listed buildings."

In March 2016 there were 47,288 listed buildings in Scotland. Of these, 8% were Category A, and 50% were Category B, with the remaining 42% being Category C.
