= List of listed buildings in Carmunnock, South Lanarkshire =

This is a list of listed buildings in the parish of Carmunnock in South Lanarkshire, Scotland (the properties are within the present boundaries of Rutherglen).

There are several listed buildings within the village of Carmunnock itself; these are shown in the List of listed buildings in Glasgow articles (entries across several sub-lists).

== List ==
| Name | Location | Date listed | Geo-coordinates | Notes | Category | LB number | Image |
|---|---|---|---|---|---|---|---|
| 3 Cathkin House, Off Menteith Drive | | | 55°48′13″N 4°11′26″W | | B | 33705 | Upload Photo |
| 142 Fernbrae Avenue, Fernhill School | | | 55°48′19″N 4°12′03″W | | C(S) | 33718 | Upload Photo |
| 250 East Kilbride Road, Elpalet | | | 55°48′31″N 4°11′06″W | | C(S) | 33717 | Upload Photo |

== Key ==
The scheme for classifying buildings in Scotland is:

- Category A: "buildings of national or international importance, either architectural or historic; or fine, little-altered examples of some particular period, style or building type."
- Category B: "buildings of regional or more than local importance; or major examples of some particular period, style or building type, which may have been altered."
- Category C: "buildings of local importance; lesser examples of any period, style, or building type, as originally constructed or moderately altered; and simple traditional buildings which group well with other listed buildings."

In March 2016 there were 47,288 listed buildings in Scotland. Of these, 8% were Category A, and 50% were Category B, with the remaining 42% being Category C.
