= List of listed buildings in Wandel And Lamington, South Lanarkshire =

This is a list of listed buildings in the parish of Wandel And Lamington in South Lanarkshire, Scotland.

== List ==
Name	Location	Date Listed	Grid Ref. (Note: Sometimes known as OSGB36, the grid reference (where provided) is based on the British national grid reference system used by the Ordnance Survey. • "Guide to National Grid". Ordnance Survey. • "Get-a-map". Ordnance Survey.)	Geo-coordinates	Notes	LB Number (Note: Historic Environment Scotland assign a unique alphanumeric identifier to each designated site in Scotland, for listed buildings this always begins with "LB", for example "LB12345".)	Image
Lamington, Townhead And Barjols Cottage				55°33′44″N 3°37′03″W	Category C(S)	12369	Upload Photo
Lamington Village, K6 Telephone Box				55°33′46″N 3°37′07″W	Category B	7453	Upload Photo
Lamington Parish Church And Graveyard, Including Boundary Walls And Headstones				55°33′41″N 3°37′18″W	Category B	7445	Upload Photo
Lamington, Ashley				55°33′47″N 3°37′08″W	Category C(S)	51661	Upload Photo
Lamington, Brookside				55°33′45″N 3°37′05″W	Category B	51663	Upload Photo
Lamington, The Schoolhouse				55°33′43″N 3°37′19″W	Category C(S)	51670	Upload Photo
Lamington, Townfoot Cottage				55°33′49″N 3°37′11″W	Category C(S)	51672	Upload Photo
Hartside Farmhouse And Steading				55°32′57″N 3°38′30″W	Category C(S)	51673	Upload Photo
Lamington, Nilghiri And Beech Cottage				55°33′44″N 3°37′03″W	Category C(S)	51667	Upload Photo
Lamington, Tinto View And Hawthron Cottage				55°33′46″N 3°37′07″W	Category B	51671	Upload Photo
Lamington Bridge				55°33′19″N 3°37′57″W	Category B	51662	Upload Photo
Lamington, Former Post Office And Emahroo				55°33′46″N 3°37′08″W	Category C(S)	51664	Upload Photo
Lamington, Hall House And Hall				55°33′50″N 3°37′10″W	Category C(S)	51665	Upload Photo
Wandel House, Wandel Farm, Wandel Barn And Rowan Stables				55°31′36″N 3°40′06″W	Category C(S)	12368	Upload Photo
Lamington, Clannalba House				55°33′50″N 3°36′57″W	Category C(S)	7448	Upload Photo
Lamington, East Lodge Including Gatepiers And Gates				55°33′52″N 3°36′28″W	Category C(S)	7452	Upload Photo
Lamington, Laundry Cottage, Including Boundary Walls				55°33′46″N 3°37′09″W	Category B	51666	Upload Photo
Lamington, Penrhyn				55°33′44″N 3°37′19″W	Category C(S)	51668	Upload Photo
Lamington, Trinity Chapel Including Headstones, Boundary Walls, Gatepiers And Gates				55°33′47″N 3°37′02″W	Category B	7447	Upload Photo
Lamington, Glebe House Including Outbuilding, Walled Garfen, Gatepiers, Gates And Sundial				55°33′45″N 3°37′14″W	Category B	7446	Upload Photo
Lamington, The Cottage				55°33′48″N 3°37′10″W	Category B	51669	Upload Photo

== Key ==
The scheme for classifying buildings in Scotland is:

- Category A: "buildings of national or international importance, either architectural or historic; or fine, little-altered examples of some particular period, style or building type."
- Category B: "buildings of regional or more than local importance; or major examples of some particular period, style or building type, which may have been altered."
- Category C: "buildings of local importance; lesser examples of any period, style, or building type, as originally constructed or moderately altered; and simple traditional buildings which group well with other listed buildings."

In March 2016 there were 47,288 listed buildings in Scotland. Of these, 8% were Category A, and 50% were Category B, with the remaining 42% being Category C.
