= List of listed buildings in Stonehouse, South Lanarkshire =

This is a list of listed buildings in the parish of Stonehouse in South Lanarkshire, Scotland.

== List ==
Name	Location	Date Listed	Grid Ref. (Note: Sometimes known as OSGB36, the grid reference (where provided) is based on the British national grid reference system used by the Ordnance Survey. • "Guide to National Grid". Ordnance Survey. • "Get-a-map". Ordnance Survey.)	Geo-coordinates	Notes	LB Number (Note: Historic Environment Scotland assign a unique alphanumeric identifier to each designated site in Scotland, for listed buildings this always begins with "LB", for example "LB12345".)	Image
St Ninian's Parish Church, Including Boundary Walls, Gatepiers And Railings, Vicars Road, Stonehouse				55°41′52″N 3°59′10″W	Category B	43686	Upload Photo
Sandford Village, Nos 2-14 Including Post Office				55°39′45″N 4°02′16″W	Category B	14412	Upload Photo
Hazeldean (Formerly High House)				55°40′27″N 4°00′44″W	Category C(S)	18508	Upload Photo
Paterson United Free Church, Lawrie Street				55°42′00″N 3°58′58″W	Category C(S)	49857	Upload Photo
Millheugh Road, Alexander Hamilton Memorial Park Bandstand				55°42′07″N 3°59′19″W	Category B	49588	Upload Photo
10 Argyle Street, Former Rex Cinema				55°41′58″N 3°58′56″W	Category B	50140	Upload Photo
Linthaugh Bridge				55°42′13″N 3°59′21″W	Category B	18507	Upload Photo
106 Lockhart Street, Meadowside Cottage, Former East Bar Tollhouse Including Outbuildings And Boundary Wall				55°42′07″N 3°58′20″W	Category C(S)	49856	Upload Photo
St Ninian's Church And Graveyard				55°42′01″N 3°59′37″W	Category B	18506	Upload Photo

== Key ==
The scheme for classifying buildings in Scotland is:

- Category A: "buildings of national or international importance, either architectural or historic; or fine, little-altered examples of some particular period, style or building type."
- Category B: "buildings of regional or more than local importance; or major examples of some particular period, style or building type, which may have been altered."
- Category C: "buildings of local importance; lesser examples of any period, style, or building type, as originally constructed or moderately altered; and simple traditional buildings which group well with other listed buildings."

In March 2016 there were 47,288 listed buildings in Scotland. Of these, 8% were Category A, and 50% were Category B, with the remaining 42% being Category C.
