= List of Australian artists =

This is a list of Australian artists.

== A ==
- Anita Aarons (1912–2000): sculptor
- Harold Abbott (1906–1986): painter
- Ian Abdulla (1947–2011): Ngarrindjeri naive artist
- Abdul Abdullah (born 1986): multimedia artist
- Jack Absalom (1927–2019): artist, author and adventurer
- Louis Abrahams (1852–1903): painter, etcher
- Tate Adams (1922–2017): artist
- Joyce Allan (1896–1966): scientific illustrator
- Micky Allan (born 1944): photographer
- Beverly Allen (born 1945): botanical artist
- Davida Allen (born 1951): painter, filmmaker and writer
- Mary Cecil Allen (1893–1962): painter, writer
- Mary Morton Allport (1806–1895): lithographer, etcher and engraver, landscapes and miniatures
- Ernie Althoff (born 1950): musician, composer, instrument builder, and visual artist
- Tony Ameneiro (born 1959): artist, printmaker
- Rick Amor (born 1948): artist and figurative painter
- Roy Ananda (born 1980): sculptor
- Brook Andrew (born 1970): contemporary artist
- Daisy Andrews (c. 1934/1935–2015): Aboriginal painter
- Garry Andrews (born 1957): painter, printmaker and art teacher
- Gordon Andrews (1914–2001): industrial and graphic designer; designed Australia's first decimal banknotes
- George French Angas (1822–1886): painter
- James Angus (born 1970): sculptor
- Giulio Anivitti (1850–1881): artist, art teacher, portrait painter and gallery curator
- Douglas Annand (1903–1976): graphic designer and artist
- Len Annois (1906–1966): watercolors
- Jean Appleton (1911–2003): prize-winning painter, printmaker, art teacher
- Silvio Apponyi (born 1949): German-Australian sculptor
- Howard Arkley (1951–1999): painter of houses, architecture, and suburbia
- Hany Armanious (born 1962): artist
- Elizabeth Armstrong (1859–1930): artist and art teacher
- Ian Armstrong (1923–2005): painter and printmaker
- Raymond Arnold (born 1950)
- Alison Marjorie Ashby (1901–1987): botanical artist
- James Ashton (1859–1935): artist and arts educator
- Julian Ashton (1851–1942): artist and teacher
- Julian Howard Ashton (1877–1964): journalist, writer, artist and critic
- Will Ashton (1881–1963): artist and gallery director
- Olive Ashworth (1915–2000): textile designer
- Estelle Asmodelle (1964–2026): abstract artist, musician, and academic
- Cristina Asquith Baker (1868–1960)
- Michael Atchison OAM (1933–2009): South Australian cartoonist
- Louisa Atkinson (1834–1872): illustrator, botanist, writer
- Yvonne Audette (born 1930): painter
- J. Muir Auld (1879–1942): painter of landscapes and figure subjects
- Daryl Austin (born 1964): painter and arts education
- Narelle Autio (born 1969): photographer

Back to top

== B ==
- Joseph Backler (1813–1895): English-born Australian painter
- Herbert Badham (1899–1961): realist painter
- Thomas Baines (1820–1875): English artist and explorer of British colonial southern Africa and Australia
- Jeannie Baker (born 1950): English-born children's picture book author and artist
- Maringka Baker (born c. 1952): painter
- Normand Baker (1908–1955): artist, winner of 1937 Archibald Prize
- Arthur Baker-Clack (1877–1955): expatriate Impressionist painter of landscapes, resident of the Étaples art colony
- Marie-Claire Baldenweg (born 1954): Swiss–Australian contemporary artist
- George Baldessin (1912–1978): Italian–Australian artist
- Alice Marian Ellen Bale (1875–1955): exhibited with the Melbourne Society of Women Painters and Sculptors
- Percival Ball (1845–1900): English sculptor active in Australia
- Sydney Ball (1933–2017): abstract painter
- Bronwyn Bancroft (born 1958): fashion designer, illustrator
- Rosalie (Ros) Edith Bandt (born 1951): composer, sound artist, academic and performer
- William Barak (1824–1903): Aboriginal artist of traditional Indigenous life and encounters with Europeans
- Irene Barberis (born 1953): English-born painter, installation artist, drawer
- Caroline Barker (1894–1988): painter
- Elsie Barlow (1876–1948): painter, printmaker
- Gustave Barnes (1877–1921): English violinist, painter and sculptor
- Virginia Barratt (born 1959): researcher, artist, writer and performer
- Jeremy Barrett (born 1936): artist
- Ethel Barringer (1883–1925): etcher
- Gwen Barringer (1882–1960): watercolourist
- Herbert Page Barringer (1886–1946): watercolourist
- Del Kathryn Barton (born 1972): artist, winner of 2008 and 2013 Archibald Prizes
- Margaret Baskerville (1861–1930): Victorian sculptor and painter
- Tom Bass (1916–2010): sculptor
- Edward La Trobe Bateman (1861–1897): painter, book illuminator, draughtsman and garden designer
- H. M. Bateman (1887–1970): humorous artist and cartoonist
- Piers Maxwell Dudley-Bateman (aka Piers Bateman)(1947–2015): landscape painter
- Terry Batt (born 1949): artist and sculptor
- Rex Battarbee (1893–1973): painter
- Ferdinand Bauer (1760–1826): Austrian botanical illustrator
- Lionel Bawden (born 1974): artist
- Clark Beaumont (formed 2010) (Sarah Clark and Nicole Beaumont), video, performance art
- John Beard (born 1943): painter, winner of 2006 Wynne Prize and 2007 Archibald Prize
- John Watt Beattie (1859–1930): photographer
- Christopher Beaumont (born 1961): still life painter
- Clarice Beckett (1887–1935): painter
- Paddy Bedford (1922–2007): Indigenous artist and architect
- Bianca Beetson: Aboriginal artist
- Marcus Beilby (born 1951): artist, winner of 1987 Sulman Prize
- George Bell (1878–1966): painter who studied in London and Paris
- Richard Bell (born 1953): painter who courted controversy
- Robert Stewart Bell AM (1946–2018): artist in ceramics and textiles and arts curator
- Lisa Bellear (1961–2006): photographer, poet, dramatist, comedian
- Jean Bellette (1908–1991): painter
- Allana Beltran: performance artist
- Jason Benjamin (1971–2021): painter, winner of 2005 Archibald Prize
- Anthony Bennett (born 1966): painter, Archibald Prize finalist 2008, 2009
- Gordon Bennett (1955–2014): Aboriginal artist
- Jane Bennett (born 1960): painter
- Portia Mary Bennett (1898–1989): painter
- Stephen Benwell (born 1953): ceramicist
- Moira Bertram (1929–?): comic artist, illustrator
- Kevin Best (1932–2012): artist, awarded the Order of Australia (OAM)
- Kate Beynon (born 1970): artist
- Charles Billich (born 1934): artist
- Asher Bilu (born 1936): painter and sculptor
- Vivienne Binns (1940–2026): artist, awarded the Order of Australia (OAM)
- Karna Maria Birmingham (1900–1987): artist, illustrator and printmaker
- Dorrit Black (1891–1951): painter, printmaker
- Charles Blackman (1928–2018): landscape artist
- Freya Blackwood (born 1975): illustrator, special effects artist
- Florence Turner Blake (1873–1959): painter
- Robin Blau (born 1946): design artist, sculptor, jeweller
- Peter Michael Blayney (1920–2014): artist
- Godfrey Blow (born 1948): artist, founder of the Perth Stuckists
- Elise Blumann (1897–1990): German-born artist who achieved recognition as an Expressionist painter
- Yvonne Boag (born 1954)
- Thomas Bock (1793–1855): portraitist
- Wim Boissevain (1927–2023): painter
- Peter Bonner (born 1964): artist
- Susie Bootja Bootja Napaltjarri (c. 1935–2003): painter
- David Booker (born 1954): contemporary sculptor
- Jeremy Boot (born 1948): wildlife painter
- Peter Booth (born 1940): figurative and abstract painter
- Marion Borgelt (born 1954): contemporary painter and mixed-media artist
- Polly Borland (born 1959): photographer
- Nancy Borlase (1914–2006): New Zealand-born landscape-based abstract painter and portraitist
- Paul Boston (born 1952): artist
- Stella Bowen (1893–1947): painter
- William Leslie Bowles (1885–1954): sculptor and medallist
- Walter Armiger Bowring (1874–1931): painter and illustrator
- Arthur Boyd (1920–1999): portraitist, member of the Boyd artistic dynasty
- Daniel Boyd (born 1982): painter, sculptor and installation artist
- David Boyd (1924–2011): artist of symbolic and historical paintings, member of the Boyd artistic dynasty
- Doris Boyd (1888–1960): painter, ceramist
- Emma Minnie Boyd (1858–1936): painter
- Guy Boyd (1923–1988): sculptor, member of the Boyd artistic dynasty
- Merric Boyd (1888–1959): ceramicist, painter, and sculptor, member of the Boyd artistic dynasty
- Penleigh Boyd (1890–1923): landscape painter, member of the Boyd artistic dynasty
- Robert Boynes (born 1942): contemporary painter
- John Brack (1920–1999): painter, member of Antipodeans Group
- Godwin Bradbeer (born 1950): figurative drawing
- Barbara Brash (1925–1998)
- Pat Brassington (born 1942): photographer, digital artist
- Dorothy Mary Braund (1926–2013): painter and printmaker
- Kate Breakey (born 1957): photographer
- Angela Brennan (born 1960): painter, ceramist
- Florence Broadhurst (1899–1977): designer
- Horace Brodzky (1885–1969): artist
- Gracius Broinowski (1837–1913): artist and ornithologist
- David Bromley (born 1960): artist
- Donald Brook (1927–2018): artist
- Anmanari Brown (born c. 1930): painter
- Nyuju Stumpy Brown (1924–2011): Wangkatjungka Indigenous Australian painter
- Paul Brown (born 1947): digital artist
- Andrew Browne (born 1960): figurative painter
- Richard Browne (1771–1824): artist and illustrator
- Lina Bryans (1909–2000): painter
- Charles David Jones Bryant (1883–1937): marine artist
- Ernest Buckmaster (1897–1968): painter, winner of the Archibald Prize in 1932
- Elliott Ronald Bull (1942–1979): landscape painter and muralist
- Knud Bull (1811–1889): Norwegian painter and counterfeiter transported to Australia
- Norma Bull (1906–1980): painter, printmaker and etcher
- Rupert Bunny (1864–1947): painter of landscapes, figure studies, and scenes drawn from mythology and literature
- Ian Burn (1939–1993): conceptual artist
- Peter Burns (1924–2020): architect and artist
- Mirranda Burton (born 1973)
- Jane Burton (born 1966): photographer
- Charles Bush (1919–1989): painter
- William Bustard (1894–1973): stained glass artist
- Louis Buvelot (1814–1888): Swiss-born landscape painter who emigrated to Australia
- Sam Byrne (1883–1978): folk painter from Broken Hill

Back to top

== C ==
- Nicholas Caire (1837–1916): photographer
- Peter Callas (born 1952): video artist
- Charles Callins (1887–1982): painter in the naïve manner
- H. H. Calvert (1870–1923): artist
- Cressida Campbell (born 1960): printmaker
- Joan Campbell (1925–1997): ceramist
- Robert Campbell (1902–1972): painter and gallery director
- Jane Cannan (1822–1861): painter, drawer
- James Cant (1911–1982): surrealist painter and teacher
- David Caon (born 1977): designer
- Jack Carington Smith (1908–1972): artist and teacher from Tasmania who won the Archibald Prize in 1963
- Ethel Carrick (1872–1952): painter
- Tom Carrington (1843–1918): journalist, political cartoonist and illustrator
- Milyika Carroll (born 1958)
- James Howe Carse (c. 1819–1900): British–Australian painter who specialized in landscapes
- Jeff Carter (1928–2010): photographer, filmmaker and author
- Maie Casey (1892–1983): aviator, poet, librettist, biographer, memoirist and artist
- Judy Cassab (1920–2015): painter, twice won the Archibald Prize
- John Cato (1926–2011): photographer and influential lecturer in photography.
- Angela Cavalieri (born 1962): printmaker
- Gino Cavicchioli (born 1957): Australian-born bust sculptor now living in Canada
- Neville Henry Cayley (1854–1903): bird artist, ornithologist
- Neville William Cayley (1886–1950): bird artist, author, ornithologist
- Harold Cazneaux (1878–1953): pictorialist photographer
- Alex Cearns: photographer
- Mutlu Çerkez (1964–2005): conceptual artist
- Queenie Chan (born 1980): Hong Kong-born comic artist
- Nicholas Chevalier (1828–1902): Russian-born artist, illustrator in lithography and water-colour
- Gunter Christmann (1936–2013): German-born Australian painter
- Ernest William Christmas (1863–1918)
- Betty Churcher (1931–2015): arts administrator and painter
- Peter Churcher (born 1964): painter of portraits and figures in a realistic style
- Marc Clark (1923–2021): sculptor and printmaker
- Bree Kristel Clarke: photographer
- Joseph Augustine Clarke (1844–1890): artist, painter, journal illustrator and arts-teacher
- Richard Clements (1951–1999): painter
- James Clifford (1936–1987): painter
- Robert Clinch (born 1957): painter and lithographer
- Romola Clifton (born 1935), Perth painter
- Densey Clyne (1922–2019): Welsh-born photographer, naturalist, writer
- George James Coates (1869–1930): portrait painter
- John Coburn (1925–2006): painter, teacher, tapestry designer and printmaker
- R. Sidney Cocks (1866–1939): artist
- Margaret Coen (1909–1993): artist
- Ola Cohn (1892–1964): sculptor
- Colin Colahan (1897–1987): painter and sculptor, died in Italy
- Bindi Cole (born 1975): photographer, video artist, installation artist
- Alfred Coleman (1890–1952): painter
- George Collingridge (1847–1931): writer and illustrator
- Albert Collins (1883–1951): painter, teacher and actor
- Amalie Sara Colquhoun (1894–1974): painter
- Charles Conder (1868–1909): English-born painter of the Heidelberg School who emigrated to Australia
- Daniel Connell (born 1970): artist
- Kevin Connor (1932–2025): artist, two-time winner of the Archibald Prize
- Sylvia Convey (born 1948): painter
- Michael Cook (born 1968): photographic artist
- William Delafield Cook (1936–2015): artist
- Justine Cooper (born 1968): animator, video artist, photographer
- William T. Cooper (1934–2015): scientific painter of birds, recipient of a Gold Medal for Distinction in Natural History Art from The Academy of Natural Sciences, Drexel University
- Yvette Coppersmith (born 1980): painter
- Edith Corbet (1846–1920): landscape painter
- Olive Cotton (1911–2003): photographer
- Noel Counihan (1913–1986): social realist painter
- Jack Courier (1915–2007)
- Virginia Coventry (born 1942): photographer
- Theodora Cowan (1868–1949): sculptor, painter
- Steve Cox (born 1958): painter and watercolourist
- Mimmo Cozzolino (born 1949): graphic designer and photo media artist
- Sybil Mary Frances Craig (1901–1989): painter
- Fred Cress (1938–2009): artist who won the Archibald Prize in 1988
- Brenda Croft (born 1964): artist, photographer, curator
- Peggie Crombie (1901–1984): painter
- Ray Crooke (1922–2015): portrait artist, Archibald Prize winner in 1969
- Grace Crowley (1890–1979): abstract artist
- Francis R. Crozier (1883–1948): war records artist
- Adam Cullen (1965–2012): artist, winner of the Archibald Prize in 2000
- Frank Cullen (1926–2010) landscape artist
- Janet Cumbrae Stewart (1883–1960): painter
- Elisabeth Cummings (born 1934): multi-award-winning artist and teacher
- James Waltham Curtis (c. 1839–1901): painter, illustrator, and photographic colourist

Back to top

== D ==
- Ante Dabro (born 1938): Croatian-born artist/sculptor and art teacher
- Johnnie Dady (born 1961): installation artist
- Lindsay Daen (1923–2001): New Zealand-born sculptor and artist
- John Dahlsen (born 1963): contemporary environmental artist
- Richard Daintree (1832–1878): photographer
- Roy Dalgarno (1910–2001): social realist artist
- Anne Dangar (1885–1951): painter, potter
- Dolly Nampijinpa Daniels (1936–2004): painter
- Aleks Danko (born 1950): performance artist and sculptor
- Alfred James Daplyn (1844–1926): painter
- William Dargie (1912–2003): painter especially of portrait paintings who won the Archibald Prize eight times
- Vicki Darken (1923–2014): landscape painter
- Malpiya Davey
- Bessie Davidson (1879–1965): painter
- David Davies (1864–1939): painter
- Edward Davies (1852–1927): architect and arts administrator
- Olive Blanche Davies (1884–1976): botanical illustrator
- Paul Davies (born 1979): artist
- John Davis (1936–1999): sculptor
- John (Francis) Davis (born 1958): artist
- Lawrence Daws (1927–2025): painter and printmaker of watercolour, drawing, screenprints, etchings and monotypes
- Janet Dawson (born 1935): painter
- Phil Day (born 1973)
- Charles Hubert de Castella (1825–1907): Swiss-Australian writer, artist and winemaker
- Geoffrey de Groen (born 1938): painter of abstract art
- Rox De Luca (born 1963) contemporary environmental visual artist
- Roy De Maistre (1894–1968): artist who explored the relationship of colour harmony to musical harmony
- Destiny Deacon (1957–2024): photographer
- Andrew Dearman: photographer
- Dennis Del Favero (born 1953): artist and academic
- Paul Delprat (born 1942): painter and illustrator, Principal of the Julian Ashton Art School
- Linda Dement (born 1960): photographer, digital artist
- Aileen Dent (1890–1978): painter
- Stuart Devlin (1931–2018): artist and metalworker
- William Dexter (1818–1860): English-Australian painter
- Maggie Diaz (1925–2016): photographer
- Robert Dickerson (1924–2015): figurative painter
- Desmond Digby (1933–2015): New Zealand-born stage designer, painter and illustrator of children's books
- Silvester Diggles (1817–1880): artist and musician
- William Dobell (1899–1970): sculptor and painter who won the Archibald Prize three times
- James Dodd (born 1977): painter, sculptor and street artist
- Ken Done (born 1940): artist, especially of design work
- Annie Dorrington (1866–1926): painter, flag designer
- Matt Doust (1984–2013): artist, finalist in the 2011 Archibald Prize
- John Dowie (1915–2008): painter, sculptor and teacher
- Julie Dowling (born 1969): Badimaya Australian artist
- Robert Hawker Dowling (1827–1886): colonial artist
- Margaret Dredge (1928–2001)
- Ada Driver (1868–1954): portrait photographer who ran a studio in Brisbane in the early twentieth century
- Russell Drysdale (1912–1981): painter of abstract and surrealist art
- William Duke (1814–1853): Irish-born Australian artist
- Karl Duldig (1902–1986): Austrian-Australian sculptor
- Slawa Duldig (1901–1975): Austrian-Australian inventor, artist, interior designer and teacher
- Brian Dunlop (1938–2009): still life and figurative painter
- Jan Dunn (ceramicist) (1940–2002): ceramicist
- Frank Dunne (1898–1937): cartoonist
- Max Dupain (1911–1992): photographer
- Elizabeth Durack (1915–2000): Western Australian artist and writer
- Ivan Durrant (born 1947): painter, performance artist and writer
- Benjamin Duterrau (1768–1851): English painter, etcher, engraver, sculptor and art lecturer who emigrated to Tasmania
- Ludwik Dutkiewicz (1921–2008): Ukrainian-born naturalized Australian artist
- Władysław Dutkiewicz (1918–1999): Polish-born naturalized Australian artist
- Olive Dutton Green (1878–1930): painter
- Geoffrey Dyer (1947–2020): artist who won the Archibald Prize in 2003
- Moya Dyring (1909–1967): painter
- Ambrose Dyson (1876–1913): illustrator and political cartoonist
- Will Dyson (1880–1938): illustrator

Back to top

== E ==
- Augustus Earle (1793–1832): London-born travel artist who spent time painting in Australia
- Stephen Eastaugh (born 1960): artist
- Lindsay Edward (1919–2007): abstract artist, mosaicist and teacher
- Agnes Edwards (c. 1873–1928): Aboriginal handicraft maker known for feather flowers
- Margery Edwards (1933–1989): mixed media artist, painter
- McLean Edwards: painter and portraitist
- Sandy Edwards (born 1948): photographer
- Mireille Eid (Astore) (born 1961): artist, writer and filmmaker
- Bonita Ely (born 1946): performance artist
- Neil Emmerson (born 1956)
- Esther Erlich (born 1955): figurative painter
- Merran Esson (1950–2022): ceramic artist
- Jessie Lavington Evans (1860–1943), painter
- Joyce Evans (1929–2019): photographer
- Lina Eve (born 1946): figurative painter, singer/songwriter, photographer, and filmmaker
- Miles Evergood (1871–1939): artist
- Raymond Boultwood "Ray" Ewers (1917–1998): sculptor
- Gladstone Eyre (1862–1933): portrait artist and landscape painter
- John Eyre (1771–?): painter and engraver

Back to top

== F ==
- Facter, aka Fletcher Andersen: street artist/painter
- David Fairbairn (born 1949): painter and printmaker
- Ian Fairweather (1891–1974): painter who combined western and Asian influences in his work
- Grant Featherston (1922–1995): furniture designer
- Adrian Feint (1894–1971): artist, noted for his bookplate designs
- Susan Fereday (born 1959): artist, photographer
- Anne Ferran (born 1949): photographer
- Simon Fieldhouse (born 1956): painter of architecture with whimsical characters
- George Edmond Finey (1895–1987): New Zealand born artist
- Gerald Fitzgerald (1873–1935): artist
- Paul Desmond Fitzgerald (1922–2017): portrait painter
- Maude Edith Victoria Fleay (1869–1965): painter
- Emily Floyd (born 1972)
- Herbert 'Bert' Flugelman (1923–2013): sculptor
- Paul Foelsche (1931–1914): photographer
- Ellis D Fogg aka Roger Foley (born 1942): Lumino Kinetic, Light Artist
- Fiona Foley (born 1964): indigenous artist from Badtjala
- George Frederick Folingsby (1828–1891): Irish born Australian painter and art educator
- Nicholas Folland (born 1967): sculptor and arts educator
- Sue Ford (1943–2009): photographer
- Haughton Forrest (1826–1925): artist
- E. Phillips Fox (1865–1915): Naturalist painter
- Ivor Pengelly Francis (1906–1993): artist, art critic and teacher
- Dale Frank (born 1959): contemporary artist
- Graham Fransella (born 1950): figurative and abstract painter
- William Frater (1890–1974), Scottish-born stained-glass designer and modernist painter
- Kristian Fredrikson (1940–2005): New Zealand-born stage and costume designer
- Harold Freedman (1915–1999): artist, renowned for his work in public murals
- Leonard French (1928–2017): painter and stained glass artist
- Zoe Freney: painter, arts writer and arts educator
- Thomas Friedensen (1879–1931): English-born artist in watercolour and oils, active in Australia
- Donald Friend (1915–1989): artist, writer and diarist
- Frederick Frith (1819–1871): English-born painter and photographer
- Douglas Fry (1872–1911): artist, especially of animal paintings
- Ella Fry (1916–1997): painter
- Merrick Fry (born 1950): artist
- Sam Fullbrook (1922–2004): artist, won the Archibald Prize in 1974
- Florence Fuller (1867–1946): painter
- Albert Henry Fullwood (1863–1930): artist who worked in black and white, oils, and watercolour

Back to top

== G ==
- Kiley Gaffney (born 1970): performance artist, musician
- Ian Gardiner (1943–2008): artist
- Silvana Gardner (born 1942): visual artist, writer
- Rosalie Gascoigne (1917–1999): sculptor, primarily of found materials
- Marea Gazzard (1928–2013): sculptor, ceramist
- Esmond George (1888–1959): SA watercolor artist, World War II war artist and art critic
- Francis Giacco (born 1955): artist who won the Archibald Prize in 1993–1994
- Geoff Gibbons (born 1947): printmaker and arts educator
- May Gibbs (1877–1969): English Australian children's author, illustrator, and cartoonist
- Charles Web Gilbert (1867–1925): sculptor
- Kevin Gilbert (1933–1993)
- Jeff Gilberthorpe (1939–2021): English-born artist and art teacher
- Jackie Kurltjunyintja Giles (1944–2010): Manyjilyjarra painter
- Harry Pelling Gill (1855–1916): English-born artist and art teacher
- S. T. Gill (1818–1880): English-born draughtsman, watercolour painter, and photographer
- Hector Gilliland (1911–2002): watercolor landscapes
- George Gittoes (born 1949): war artist using painting, drawing, photographs and video
- Shaun Gladwell (born 1972): video, performance, painting and sculpture
- Michaela Gleave (born 1980); conceptual installations
- James Gleeson (1915–2008): surrealist artist, poet, critic, writer and curator
- Allan C. Glover (1900–1984): etcher and printmaker
- Harry Glover (artist) (c. 1810–1858): English artist in South Australia
- Henry H. Glover (c. 1827–1904): artist, son of above
- John Glover (artist) (1767–1849): English artist in Tasmania, not related
- Lloyd Godman (1952–2023): photographer and environmental artist
- Duncan Goldfinch (1888–1960): painter
- John Charles Goodchild (1898–1980): painter and art educator
- Agnes Goodsir (1864–1939): portrait painter
- Richard Goodwin (born 1953): artist, architect and professor of fine arts and design
- Julie Gough (born 1965): artist, writer and curator
- William Buelow Gould (1801–1853): English painter transported to Van Diemen's Land in 1826
- Peter Gouldthorpe (born 1954): artist, children's picture book author and illustrator
- James William Govett (1910–1998): impressionist painter
- Peter Benjamin Graham (1925–1987): visual artist, printer, and art theorist
- Peter Sebastian Graham (born 1970): artist, painter, printmaker and sculptor
- Alma Nungarrayi Granites (1955–2017): artist
- Siv Grava (born 1954): artist, winner of Doug Moran National Portrait Prize
- Virginia Grayson (born 1967): visual artist, winner of the Dobell Drawing Prize
- Sasha Grbich: installation artist
- Denise Green (born 1946): painter
- Jillian Green (born 1975); artist
- Olive Dutton Green (1878–1930): artist
- Rona Green (born 1972): artist
- Tom Green (1913–1981): painter, printmaker and art teacher
- Victor Greenhalgh (1900–1983): sculptor and teacher
- Francis Greenway (1777–1837): English-born architect
- Garry Greenwood (1943–2005)
- Guy Grey-Smith (1916–1981): painter, printmaker and ceramicist
- Robert Grieve (1924–2006)
- Murray Griffin (1903–1992): printmaker and painter
- Mabel "May" Grigg (1885–1969): painter
- Henry Gritten (c. 1818–1873): English painter
- Ann Grocott (born 1938): writer and painter
- Elioth Gruner (1882–1939): New Zealand-born painter, winner of the Wynne Prize seven times
- Julia Gutman (born 1993): textile Artist and winner of 2023 Archibald Prize
- Rob Gutteridge (born 1954): English-born painter and arts educator
- Marjorie Gwynne (1886–1958): painter
- Harold Frederick Neville Gye (1888–1967): cartoonist

Back to top

== H ==
- Emma Hack (born 1972): photographer
- Basil Hadley (1940–2006): born London, UK, arrived to Australia in 1965, printmaker and painter
- Robert Hague (born 1967): New Zealand-born artist
- Fiona Hall (born 1953): contemporary visual artist
- Lindsay Bernard Hall (1859–1935): English-born Australian artist and art gallery director
- Deborah Halpern (born 1957): sculptor, mosaic artist, ceramist
- Stanislav "Stacha" Halpern (1919–1969): Polish Australian painter and sculptor
- Michelle Hamer (born 1975): tapestry artist
- Amber Hammad (born 1981): multi-disciplinary/self portraiture
- Lyn Hancock: photographer, writer
- Henry Hanke (1901–1989): artist who won the Archibald Prize in 1934
- Marjorie Hann (1916–2011): South Australian cartoonist, painter and art teacher
- Robert Hannaford (born 1944): realist artist
- Barbara Hanrahan (1939–1991): artist, printmaker and writer
- Albert J. Hanson (1866–1914): landscape painter in both oil and water-colour
- Nicholas Harding (1956–2022): artist who won the Archibald Prize in 2001
- Lily Nungarrayi Yirringali Jurrah Hargraves (1930–2018): painter
- Pro Hart (1928–2006): father of the Outback painting movement
- Cecil Hartt (1884–1930): cartoonist
- Edmund Arthur Harvey (1907–1994): British-born Australian artist
- Ponch Hawkes (born 1946): photographer
- Elaine Haxton (1909–1999): painter, printmaker, designer and commercial artist
- Louise Hearman (born 1963): figurative painter
- Ivor Hele (1912–1993): war artist for the Australian War Memorial, five times Archibald Prize winner
- Catherine Jenna Hendry (CJ Hendry) (born 1988): hyper-realistic, large-scale renderings using a scribbling technique
- Euan Heng (born 1945): Scottish-born painter and printmaker
- Lucien Henry (1850–1896): French painter in Sydney
- Bill Henson (born 1955): contemporary photographic artist
- Harold Herbert (1891–1945)
- Petr Herel (1943–2022): Czechoslovakia-born printmaker, painter
- Sali Herman (1898–1993): Swiss-born war artist
- Bernard Hesling (1905–1987): British-born muralist and painter
- Joy Hester (1920–1960): modernist painter
- Hans Heysen (1877–1968): German painter of watercolours of the bush
- Nora Heysen (1911–2003): 1938 Archibald Prize winner and first women official war artist
- Jacqueline Hick (1919–2004): painter
- Dale Hickey (born 1937): painter and teacher
- J. J. Hilder (1881–1916): watercolourist from the Heidelberg School
- Charles Hill (1824–1915): engraver, painter and arts educator
- Robin Hill (born 1932): artist and writer
- Merris Hillard (born 1949)
- Frank Hinder (1906–1992): painter, sculptor and art teacher
- Margel Hinder (1906–1995): Australian-American modernist sculptor
- Ludwig Hirschfeld Mack (1893–1965): German/Australian artist
- Robert Hitchcock (born 1944): sculptor
- Noela Hjorth (1940–2016): artist and builder of houses, known as living sculptures
- Robert Hoddle (1794–1881): surveyor and artist
- Christopher Hodges: artist and art gallery director
- Frank Hodgkinson (1919–2001): war artist
- Rayner Hoff (1894–1937): Isle of Man-born sculptor who lived and worked in Australia
- Robert Hollingworth (born 1947): painter, video artist, writer, novelist; winner of 1990 Sulman Prize
- Cherry Hood (born 1959): portraitist, won the 2002 Archibald Prize
- Gordon Hookey (born 1961): painter, sculptor
- Laurence Hope (1927–2016): artist
- Livingston York Yourtee "Hop" Hopkins (1846–1927): American-born cartoonist
- Chris Horder (born 1976): won the Young Emerging Artist Award in the 2011 Mosman Art Prize
- Marie Horseman (1911–1974): cartoonist, illustrator, fashion designer
- Henry Leonardus van den Houten (1801–1879): Dutch-Australian painter, lithographer and art teacher
- Valma Howell (1896–1979): painter, actress
- Laurence Hotham Howie (1876–1963): South Australian sculptor, painter, and art teacher
- John Howley (1931–2020): painter
- Frank Hurley (1885–1962): photographer, filmmaker and adventurer
- Polly Hurry (1883–1963): painter
- Margot Hutcheson (born 1952): British-born painter

Back to top

== I ==
- Nelson Illingworth (1862–1926): English-born sculptor
- Robert Ingpen (born 1936): graphic designer, illustrator, and author
- Adelaide Ironside (1831–1867): painter
- Pamela Irving (born 1960): ceramicist, mosaicist and writer
- Jean Isherwood (1911–2006): painter
- Linde Ivimey (born 1965): sculptor

Back to top

== J ==
- Kenneth Jack (1924–2006): watercolour painter, and printmaker, member of RWS
- Robert Jacks (1943–2014): painter, sculptor and printmaker
- James R. Jackson (1882–1975): artist, primarily of Sydney harbor
- Roy Jackson (1944–2013): artist
- Lionel Jago (1882–1953): artist
- Ann James (born 1952): children's book illustrator, graphic designer
- Louis Robert James (1920–1996): abstract painter in oils
- Thancoupie Gloria Fletcher James (1937–2011): ceramicist, painter and textile artist, Aboriginal artist
- Gil Jamieson (1934–1992): painter of figurative art works, landscape art works, and portraits
- Bob Jenyns (1944–2015): humorous and figurative sculpture, painting, drawing and prints
- Natalie Jeremijenko (born 1966): installation artist
- Reginald Jerrold-Nathan (1889–1979): portraits, esp. of political women
- Carol Jerrems (1949–1980): photographer
- Clytie Jessop (1929–2017): artist, actress, screenwriter and director
- Guo Jian (born 1962): painter, sculptor, photographer
- Natasha Johns-Messenger (born 1970): installation artist, photographer
- George Johnson (1926–2021): painter of modernist art, especially geometric abstraction
- Roger Kirk Hayes Johnson (1922–1991): architect, planner, potter, painter, sculptor, writer and educator
- Anne Jolliffe (1933–2021): animator
- Eric Jolliffe (1907–2001): cartoonist and illustrator on outback themes
- Henry Jones (1826–1911): photographer
- Joe Jonsson (1890–1963): Swedish-born cartoonist
- Allan Jordan (1898–1982)
- Justus Jorgensen (1893–1975): artist and architect
- Ellen Jose (1951–2017): photographer, printmaker
- Loui Jover (born 1967): painter, artist
- Anne Judell (born 1942): artist, winner of the 2011 Dobell Prize
- Robert Juniper (1929–2012): illustrator, art teacher, sculptor and printmaker

Back to top

== K ==
- Louis Kahan (1905–2002): artist born in Vienna who won the Archibald Prize in 1962
- Kitty Kantilla (1928–2003): painter, printmaker, sculptor
- Shokufeh Kavani (born 1970): Iranian-born painter
- Barry Kay (1932–1985): stage and costume designer
- Hanna Kay: Israeli-born painter
- Ash Keating (born 1980): artist
- Jennifer Keeler-Milne (born 1961): painter, drawer
- Anwen Keeling (born 1976): portrait painter
- David Keeling (born 1951): artist
- John Kelly (born 1965): artist
- Rik Kemp (born 1939): cartoonist, illustrator
- Roger Kemp (1907–1987): artist, especially of transcendental abstraction
- Franz Kempf (1926–2020)
- Tjungkara Ken (born 1969): painter
- Billy Tjampitjinpa Kenda (born c 1967): painter
- Caroline Kennedy-McCracken (born 1967): musician, painter, sculptor
- Rachel Khedoori (born 1964): painter, sculptor
- Toba Khedoori (born 1964): mixed media painter
- Patrick Kilvington (1922–1990): artist of musters, round-ups and horses in motion
- Grahame King (1915–2008): master printmaker
- Inge King (1915–2016): German-born sculptor
- Leah King-Smith (born 1956): photographer
- Barbie Kjar (born 1957): printmaker, drawer, painter
- Anita Klein (born 1960): painter, printmaker
- Robert Klippel (1920–2001): sculptor
- Anastasia Klose (born 1978): performance artist, installation artist
- Michael Kmit (1910–1981): Ukrainian painter who spent twenty-five years in Australia and died in Sydney
- Sue Kneebone (born 1963): artist and arts educator
- Emily Kngwarreye (1910–1996): Aboriginal artist from the Utopia community
- William Dunn Knox (1820–1945): painter, member of the Victorian Artists Society
- Lisette Kohlhagen (1890–1969): painter
- Theo Koning (born 1950): Dutch-born Western Australian painter, sculptor, printmaker and art teacher
- Susan Kozma-Orlay (1913–2008): mid-century modernist designer
- Derek Kreckler (born 1952): multi-media visual artist

Back to top

== L ==
- Vida Lahey (1882–1968): painter
- Rosemary Laing (1959–2024): photographer
- George Lambert (1873–1930): artist of portrait paintings and war artist
- Pat Larter (1936–1996): mail artist, photographer, performance artist, painter
- Richard Larter (1929–2014): painter, often identified as one of Australia's few highly recognisable pop artists
- David Larwill (1956–2011): artist
- Janet Laurence (born 1947): mixed media artist, installation artist
- Peter Laverty (1926–2013): painter, printmaker, art educator and gallery director
- George Lawrence (1901–1981): painter in the impressionist style
- Donald Laycock (born 1931): painter
- Sam Leach (born 1973): figurative painter, winner of 2010 Archibald Prize and Wynne Prize
- Alun Leach-Jones (1937–2017): painter, sculptor, printmaker
- Bill Leak (1956–2017): cartoonist and painter
- Percy Leason (1889–1959): cartoonist, painter
- Lindy Lee (born 1954): sculptor, painter
- Derwent Lees (1884–1931): landscape painter
- Laurence Le Guay (1916–1990): photographer
- Fred Leist (1878–1945): muralist and war artist
- Kerrie Lester (1953–2016): artist
- Michael Leunig (1945–2024): cartoonist, poet and cultural commentator
- Margo Lewers (1908–1978): interdisciplinary abstract artist
- John Lewin (1770–1819): English-born artist of natural history, active in Australia
- Wilbraham Frederick Evelyn Liardet (1799–1878): hotelier, water-colour artist and historian
- Colonel William Light (1786–1839): British naval and army officer and a painter, the first Surveyor-General of the Colony of South Australia
- Peter Lik (born 1959): fine art photographer
- Kevin Lincoln (born 1941): artist
- Daryl Lindsay (1889–1976): sketcher, illustrator, and art critic
- Joan Lindsay (1896–1984): author
- Lionel Lindsay (1874–1961): artist specializing in etching and engraving
- Norman Lindsay (1879–1969): sculptor, writer, editorial cartoonist and scale modeler
- Percy Lindsay (1870–1952): landscape painter, illustrator and cartoonist
- Ruby Lindsay (1885–1919): illustrator, painter
- Anthony Lister (born 1979): artist specializing in street art, expressionism, and pop art
- W. Lister Lister (1859–1943): painter, won the Wynne Prize seven times
- Norman Lloyd (1895–1983): landscape painter
- Tony Lloyd (born 1970): figurative painter
- Leonard Long (1911–2013): painter
- Sydney Long (1871–1955): painter, etcher, and teacher
- John Longstaff (1861–1941): painter, war artist and a five-time winner of the Archibald Prize
- Will Longstaff (1879–1953): painter and war artist
- Keith Looby (born 1940): artist who won the Archibald Prize in 1984
- Loongkoonan (c. 1910–2018): painter, Aboriginal elder
- Steve Lopes (born 1971): figurative painter
- Josh Lord (born 1972): artist specializing in acrylic house paint
- Gretta Louw (born 1981): interdisciplinary artist working across digital media, installation, drawing, and textiles
- Fred Lowen ((1919–2005)): designer
- Fiona Lowry (born 1974): painter
- Joseph Lycett (c. 1774–1827): English-born portrait and miniature painter, active in Australia
- Elwyn (Jack) Lynn (1917–1997): artist, author, art critic and curator

Back to top

== M ==
- Andrew MacCormac (1826–1918): portrait painter
- Stewart Angus MacFarlane (born 1953): figurative painter
- Norman Macgeorge (1872–1952): artist and art critic
- William Priestly MacIntosh (1857–1930): sculptor
- Sir Edgar Bertram Mackennal (1863–1931): sculptor and medallist
- Chips Mackinolty (born 1954): artist printmaking and journalist
- Euan Macleod (born 1956): New Zealand artist who won the Archibald Prize in 1999
- William Macleod (1850–1929): artist and a partner in The Bulletin
- Matthew James MacNally (1873–1943): watercolourist
- Mary Macqueen (1912–1994): printmaker, mixed media artist
- Bea Maddock (1934–2016): artist combining printing with encaustic painting and installation art
- Guy Maestri (born 1974): painter, winner of 2009 Archibald Prize
- Ma Mahood (1901–1989): painter, ceramist, printmaker
- Jeffrey Makin (born 1943): artist, art critic, and Director of Port Jackson Press Australia
- David Malangi (1927–1999): bark painter, printmaker, carver, designer
- Henri Mallard (1884–1967): photographer
- Gillian Mann (1939–2007): printmaker
- Diane Mantzaris (born 1962): digital artist, printmaker
- Wakuthi Marawili (1921–2005): painter, bark painter
- Paul Margocsy (born 1945): watercolourist
- Banduk Marika (1954–2021): indigenous Australian artist and printmaker
- Wandjuk Marika (1927–1987): contemporary Indigenous Australian artist, actor, composer and land rights activist
- Stella Marks (1887–1985): best known as a portrait miniaturist
- Claude Marquet (1869–1920): political cartoonist
- Conrad Martens (1801–1878): English-born landscape artist active in Australia
- Monte Masi (born 1983): performance-based video artist
- John Mather (1848–1916): Scottish-Australian plein-air painter and etcher
- John Baxter Mather (1853–1940): Scottish-Australian journalist, newspaper proprietor, landscape painter and art critic
- John Mawurndjul (1952–2024): indigenous artist in a traditional painting technique rarrk
- William James Maxwell (ca.1843–1903): Scottish-born sculptor
- Daphne Mayo (1895–1982): sculptor
- Kathleen McArthur (1915–2001): botanical illustrator, environmentalist, naturalist
- Herbert McClintock (1906–1985): social realist artist
- Francis McComas (1875–1938): Australian-born artist who spent most of his adult life in California
- Georgiana McCrae (1804–1890): painter, diarist
- Frederick McCubbin (1855–1917): painter of the Heidelberg School
- Louis McCubbin (1890–1952): war artist, landscape painter and gallery director
- Alan McLeod McCulloch (1907–1992): art historian and gallery director, cartoonist, and painter
- Francine McDougall: filmmaker, photographer
- Malcolm McGookin (born 1956): cartoonist, writer, painter, musician
- Raymond McGrath (1903–1977): architect, illustrator, printmaker and interior designer
- William Beckwith McInnes (1889–1939): portrait painter, winner of the Archibald Prize seven times
- Arthur McIntyre (1945–2003): artist and art critic
- Alexander McKenzie (born 1971): painter, a six times finalist of the Archibald Prize
- Queenie McKenzie (1930–1998): painter
- Tommy McRae (1835–1901): artist
- Clement Meadmore (1929–2005): Australian-American sculptor known for massive outdoor steel sculptures
- Penny Meagher (1935–1995): painter
- Lilian Marguerite Medland (1880–1955): illustrator, painter
- Charles Meere (1890–1961): English-Australian artist
- Dora Meeson (1869–1955): painter
- Annemieke Mein (born 1944): Dutch-born textile artist
- Max Meldrum (1875–1955): painter, winner of the Archibald Prize in 1939 and 1940
- Mortimer Luddington Menpes (1855–1938): Australian-born artist, author, printmaker and illustrator
- Mary Cockburn Mercer (1882–1963): painter
- Louisa Anne Meredith (1812–1895): Anglo/Australian writer and illustrator, also known as Louisa Anne Twamley
- Bertha Merfield (1869–1921): painter and muralist
- Vladas Meskenas (1916–2020): Sydney painter, born in Lithuania
- Bill Meyer (born 1942): artist who uses photography, film and music in his work
- mez (Mary-Anne Breeze): Australian-based Internet artist
- Margaret Michaelis-Sachs (1902–1985): Polish-born photographer
- Rodney Armour "Rod" Milgate (1934–2014): painter and playwright
- David Miller (born c.1950): painter
- Lewis Miller (born 1959): painter and visual artist, known for his portraits and figurative works, winner of 1998 Archibald Prize
- Peter Milne (born 1960): photographer and visual artist, known for documenting the Melbourne punk and comedy scenes in the 1970s and 80s
- Benjamin Edwin Minns (1863–1937): watercolourist
- Harold "Hal" Missingham (1906–1994): Australian artist, Director of the Art Gallery of New South Wales from 1945 to 1971, and president of the Australian Watercolour Institute from 1952 to 1955
- Jan Mitchell (1940–2008): painter, sculptor, illustrator, printmaker
- Robert Boyed Mitchell (1919–2002): abstract expressionist artist
- Joanne Mitchelson (born 1971): painter
- Tracey Moffatt (born 1960): artist using primarily photography and video
- Ernest Edward Moffitt (1871–1899): artist
- George Molnar (1910–1998): Hungarian-Australian cartoonist
- Jon Molvig (1923–1970): expressionist artist
- Reg Mombassa (born 1951): New Zealand-born artist and musician
- Milton Moon (1926–2019): potter, teacher and author
- Alan Moore (1914–2015): war artist
- David Moore (1927–2003): photographer and photojournalist.
- May and Mina Moore (1881–1931, 1882–1957): photographers
- Mirka Mora (1928–2018): French-born painter, sculptor, mosaic artist
- Harriet Morgan (1830–1907): natural history illustrator
- Sally Morgan (born 1951): Aboriginal author, scriptwriter and contemporary Indigenous Australian artist
- George Pitt Morison (1861–1946): painter and engraver
- Ethel Jackson Morris (1891–1985): illustrator
- Joan Morrison (1911–1969), cartoonist and book illustrator
- Christine Morrow (born 1971): British-born visual artist
- Gareth Morse (1932–2023): Welsh-born landscape painter, art critic and educator
- Grant Mudford (born 1944): photographer
- Sally M. Nangala Mulda (born 1957): artist
- Patricia Mullins (born 1952): children's book illustrator
- Ginger Riley Munduwalawala (c.1936–2002): contemporary artist
- Evonne Munuyngu, (born 1960): weaver
- Arthur Murch (1902–1989): painter, winner of the Archibald Prize in 1949
- Les Murdoch (born 1957), pioneer of Aboriginal Op art Surrealism
- Wendy Murray (artist) (born 1974): printmaker, painter, arts educator
- Vali Myers (1930–2003): artist who specialized in fine pen and ink drawings
- Patricia Moran (1944–2017): painter
- Bruce Munro (born 1959): dual nationality (Australian/Great Britain), primary medium light
- Tanya Myshkin (born 1961): printmaker

== N ==
- Bardayal 'Lofty' Nadjamerrek (1926–2009): painter
- Mick Namarari Tjapaltjarri (1926–1998): painter
- Albert Namatjira (1902–1959): Indigenous Australian artist
- Vincent Namatjira (born 1983): Indigenous Australian artist
- Rosella Namok (born 1979): Indigenous Australian artist
- Eubena Nampitjin (1921–2013): painter, teacher
- Narputta Nangala (1933–2010)
- Frank Arthur Nankivell (1869–1959): artist and political cartoonist
- Daisy Jugadai Napaltjarri (c. 1955–2008): painter
- Molly Jugadai Napaltjarri (c. 1954–2011): painter
- Ngoia Pollard Napaltjarri (c. 1948–2022): painter
- Tjunkiya Napaltjarri (c. 1927–2009): painter
- Wintjiya Napaltjarri (c. 1923–1934–2014): painter
- Makinti Napanangka (c. 1930–2011): indigenous Australian artist
- Dorothy Napangardi (early 1950s–2013): painter
- Lily Kelly Napangardi (born c. 1948): painter
- Yalti Napangati (born c. 1970): painter
- Yuhana Nashmi: Iraqi-Australian ceramicist, sculptor, painter
- Simeon Nelson (born 1964): sculptor and transdisciplinary artist
- Girolamo Nerli (1860–1926)
- Norie Neumark: American-born sound artist
- Albert Ernest Newbury (1891–1941): landscape and portrait painter
- Ann Newmarch (1945–2022): painter, printmaker, sculptor
- Marc Newson (born 1963): designer
- Helmut Newton (1920–2004): German-Australian fashion photographer noted for his nude studies of women
- June Newton (1923–2021): photographer, actress
- Paul Newton (born 1961): portrait artist who has twice won the Archibald Prize
- Mavis Ngallametta (1944–2019)
- Hilda Rix Nicholas (1884–1961): painter
- Peter Nicholson (born 1946): political cartoonist, caricaturist and sculptor
- Deborah Niland (born 1950)
- Kilmeny Niland (1950–2009)
- Sandro Nocentini (born 1966): painter
- Sidney Nolan (1917–1992): painter and printmaker
- Elizabeth May Norriss, later Bess Norriss Tait (1878–1939): artist
- James Northfield (1887–1973): graphic artist
- Rosaleen Norton (1917–1979): painter, occultist
- Naata Nungurrayi (1932–2021): artist
- Charles Nuttall (1872–1934): artist noted for his illustrations
- Lena Nyadbi (c. 1936–2024): painter, installation artist

Back to top

== O ==
- Carla O'Brien: installation artist
- Kathleen O'Brien (1914–1991): comic artist, illustrator, fashion artist
- Kathleen O'Connor (1876–1968): New Zealand-born painter
- Gabby O'Connor (born 1974): New Zealand-based installation artist
- Peter O'Doherty (born 1958): musician and artist specializing in still life and suburbia
- Edward Officer (1871–1921): painter, Australian Art Association inaugural president
- John Armstrong Ogburn (1925–2010): painter.
- Pixie O'Harris (1903–1991): Welsh-born illustrator, cartoonist, painter, author
- Dorothea "Dora" Adela Ohlfsen-Bagge (1869–1948): pianist, painter, sculptor, spy and particularly a medallist
- Bronwyn Oliver (1959–2006): sculptor
- Margaret Olley (1923–2011): painter specializing in still life
- Bernard Ollis (born 1951): contemporary painter
- John Olsen (1928–2023): landscape painter who won the Archibald Prize in 2005
- Lin Onus (1948–1996): Scottish–Koori Aboriginal artist
- Rosemary Opala (1923–2008): illustrator, writer, nurse
- Desiderius Orban (1884–1986): Hungarian-Australian painter, printmaker and teacher
- Christopher Orchard (born 1950): artist and arts educator
- Mandy Ord (born 1974): comic artist
- Raquel Ormella (born 1969): multimedia artist
- George Cross Thomas Orr (1882–1933): watercolourist
- Jill Orr (born 1952): performance artist, photographer, installation artist
- Joseph Stanislaus Ostoja-Kotkowski (1922–1994): Polish-Australian artist best known for his ground-breaking work in chromasonics, laser kinetics and 'sound and image' productions
- Ida Rentoul Outhwaite (1888–1960): children's book illustrator
- Robert Owen (born 1937): artist and curator

Back to top

== P ==
- Josonia Palaitis (born 1949): artist
- Wendy Paramor (1938–1975): artist
- Trent Parke (born 1971): photographer
- Roy Parkinson (1901–1945): watercolour artist
- Lenton Parr (1924–2003): sculptor and teacher
- Mike Parr (born 1945): performance artist and printmaker
- John Passmore (1904–1984): abstract expressionist painter
- Klytie Pate (1912–2010): studio potter
- John Ford Paterson (1851–1912): Scottish-born Australian artist
- Ambrose McCarthy Patterson (1877–1966): painter and printmaker
- Frances Wildt Pavlu (died 2016): art jeweller
- John Peart (1945–2013)
- Colin Pennock (born 1964): artist
- Tom Peerless (1858–1896): artist
- John Perceval (1923–2000): artist of drawings, paintings, and ceramics
- Billy Benn Perrurle (c 1943–2012): artist
- Stieg Persson (born 1959): contemporary painter
- Bruce Petty (1929–2023): political satirist and cartoonist
- Gloria Petyarre (1942–2021): contemporary Indigenous Australian artist
- Jeanna Petyarre (born 1950): painter
- Kathleen Petyarre (1940–2018): painter
- Nancy Petyarre (1938–2009): contemporary Indigenous Australian artist
- Debra Phillips (born 1958): photographer, sculptor
- Patricia Piccinini (born 1965): mixed-media artist
- Shane Pickett (1957–2010): Nyoongar artist
- William Edwin Pidgeon (1909–1981): painter who won the Archibald Prize three times
- Julianne Pierce: new media artist, curator, art critic
- Gwyn Hanssen Pigott (1935–2013), ceramist
- W. C. Piguenit (1836–1914): landscape painter
- Anne Pincus (born 1961): painter, sculptor
- Carl Plate (1909–1977): painter, collage artist, sculptor, printmaker
- Evert Ploeg (born 1963): portrait painter
- Terrance Plowright (born 1949): contemporary and figurative sculptor
- Leif Podhajsky: graphic designer
- Axel Poignant (1906–1986): photographer
- Leon Pole (1871–1951): artist associated with the Heidelberg School
- Rodney Pople (born 1952): artist
- Pietro Porcelli (1872–1943): Italian-born sculptor
- Port Jackson Painter (active 1788–1790s): plant and animal watercolour artist(s) (identity unknown)
- Arthur Ted Powell (born 1947): landscape painter and printmaker
- Harold Septimus Power (1877–1951): artist
- Dr John Joseph Wardell Power (1881–1943): Modernist artist
- Cedar Prest (born 1940): stained glass artist
- Margaret Preston (1875–1963): modernist painter and printmaker
- Reg Preston (1917–2000): potter
- Thea Proctor (1879–1966): portrait painter and printmaker
- Geoffrey Proud (1946–2022): artist who won the Archibald Prize in 1990
- John Skinner Prout (1805–1876): English-born painter of lithographs, watercolours and oils
- Oswald Pryor (1881–1971): cartoonist
- Clifton Pugh (1924–1990): painter of landscapes and portraiture
- Shirley Purdie (born 1947): contemporary Indigenous Australian artist
- Peter Purves Smith (1912–1949): painter
- Minnie Pwerle (1910–2006): contemporary Indigenous Australian artist

Back to top

== Q ==
- Ben Quilty (born 1973): portrait painter and war artist, winner of 2011 Archibald Prize
- James Peter Quinn (1869–1951): portrait painter

Back to top

== R ==
- Melinda Rackham (born 1959): sculptor and Internet artist
- John Radecki (1865–1955): stained glass artist working in Australia
- Isobel "Iso" Rae (1860–1940): impressionist painter
- John Rae (1813–1900): administrator, painter and author
- Hugh Ramsay (1877–1906): artist
- Richard John Randall (1869–1906): artist
- David Rankin (born 1946): New York-based painter
- Stanislav Rapotec AM (1913–1997): artist
- Henry Rayner (1902–1957): Australian artist known for his drypoint etchings
- Norma Redpath OBE (1928–2013): painter and sculptor
- Richard Read Sr. (ca. 1765 – ca. 1829): British-born artist who was sent to Australia as a convict.
- David Jay Reed (born 1950): artist, photographer, graphic designer
- Lloyd Rees (1895–1998): landscape painter
- Alison Baily Rehfisch (1900–1974): painter
- Anton Riebe (1904–1987): landscape painter
- Virgil Reilly (1892–1974): cartoonist, comic book artist and illustrator
- Gladys Reynell (1881–1956): one of South Australia's earliest potters
- Jon Rhodes (born 1947): photographer
- Geoffrey Ricardo (born 1964): artist, printmaker and sculptor
- Charles Douglas Richardson (1853–1932): Victorian sculptor and painter
- William Ricketts (1898–1993): potter and sculptor of the arts and crafts movement
- John Rigby (1922–2012): painter of tropical and bush landscapes, genre works and portraits
- Paul Crispin Rigby AM (1924–2006): cartoonist
- Michael Riley (1960–2004): photographer, documentary filmmaker
- Ginger Riley Munduwalawala (1936–2002): painter
- Hilda Rix Nicholas (1884–1961): conservative post-impressionist painter
- Douglas Roberts (1919–1976): painter and art critic
- Ian Roberts (born 1952): bird and native vegetation painter
- Tom Roberts (1856–1931): artist and a member of the Heidelberg School
- Lynne Roberts-Goodwin (born 1954): photographer, video and installation artist
- Freda Rhoda Robertshaw (1916–1997): artist
- Ronald Charles Robertson-Swann OAM (born 1941): sculptor
- Julia Robinson (born 1981): sculptor
- William Robinson (1936–2025): painter and lithographer
- Charles Rodius (1802–1860): German-born artist, printmaker and architect
- Florence Aline Rodway (1881–1971): artist best known for her portraits
- Lisa Roet (born 1967): artist
- Andrew Rogers (born 1947): sculptor and land artist
- Robert Rooney (1937–2017): artist and art critic
- Herbert Rose (1890–1937): painter and etcher
- Daisy Mary Rossi (1879–1974): artist, interior designer and writer
- Dick Roughsey (1920–1985): painter
- Ellis Rowan (1847–1922): naturalist and illustrator
- Julie Rrap (born 1950): contemporary artist
- Dattilo Rubbo (1870–1955): Italian-born artist and art teacher
- Craig Ruddy (1968–2022): painter of portraits, nudes and self studies, winner of 2004 Archibald Prize
- James Newton Russell AM MBE (1909–2001): cartoonist
- John Peter Russell (1858–1930): impressionist painter
- Robert Russell (1808–1900): architect and surveyor

Back to top

== S ==
- Jenny Sages (born 1933): Chinese-born painter, freelance writer, and illustrator
- Loudon Sainthill (1918–1969): artist and stage and costume designer
- William Arthur Salmon (1928–2018): painter
- Tom Samek (1950–2021): Czech-born muralist
- Gareth Sansom (born 1939): artist, painter, printmaker and collagist
- Hugh Sawrey (1919–1999): landscape artist and stockman
- Jan Hendrik Scheltema (1861–1941): Dutch-born landscape and livestock painter.
- Jörg Schmeisser (1942–2012): painter, printmaker and art teacher
- Joyce Scott (born 1942): drawing, oil painting and ceramics
- Montague Scott (1835–1909): artist
- Ken Searle (born 1951): artist
- Brian Seidel (1928–2019): painter and teacher
- Udo Sellbach (1927–2006): artist, printmaker and art teacher
- Gert Sellheim (1901–1970): German-Australian artist who won the Sulman Prize in 1939
- Jan Senbergs (born as Jānis Šēnbergs in Latvia, 1939–2024): artist and printmaker
- Dora Serle (1875–1968): painter
- Peter Serwan (born 1962): artist and teacher
- Rebecca Shanahan: artist
- Martin Sharp (1942–2013): artist, underground cartoonist, songwriter and filmmaker
- Peter Sharp (born 1964): specialises in drawing
- Raelene Sharp (born 1957): portrait painter Archibald Prize Packing Room Winner 2012
- Wendy Sharpe (born 1960): portraitist and war artist
- Garry Shead (born 1942): artist and filmmaker who won the Archibald Prize in 1992–1993
- Ben Shearer (born 1941): artist who specialises in watercolour painting of the Outback
- Shen Jiawei (born 1948): Chinese Australian painter and winner of the 2006 Sir John Sulman Prize
- Kathleen Shillam AM (1916–2002): English-born sculptor
- Leonard George Shillam AM (1915–2005): sculptor
- Heather Shimmen (born 1957): artist, printmaker
- John Shirlow (1869–1936): artist
- Athol Shmith (1914–1990): studio portrait and fashion photographer and photography educator
- Ivy Shore (1915–1999): painter, winner of Portia Geach Memorial Award
- Andrew Sibley (1933–2015): English-born artist
- Allan F. Sierp (1905–1982): artist and author
- Wolfgang Sievers (1913–2007): photographer who specialised in architectural and industrial photography
- Achille Simonetti (1838–1900): Italian-born sculptor
- Norah Simpson (1895–1974): modernist painter
- Darren Siwes (born 1968): photographer, painter
- Rein Slagmolen (1916–1999): Dutch-Australian artist and sculptor
- Matthew Sleeth (born 1972:) visual artist and filmmaker
- Jeffrey Smart (1921–2013): painter, known for his modernist depictions of urban landscapes
- Sally Smart (born 1960): known for her large-scale assemblage installations that address gender and identity politics
- Tony Smibert (born 1949): painter who specialises in watercolour painting
- Bernard Smith (1916–2011): art historian, art critic and academic
- Eric Smith (1919–2017): portraitist
- Grace Cossington Smith (1892–1984): artist and pioneer of modernist painting
- Joshua Smith (1905–1995): artist who won the Archibald Prize in 1944
- Mervyn Ashmore Smith OAM (1904–1994): artist
- Douglas Snelling (1916–1985): architect and furniture designer
- Lance Solomon (1913–1989): painter, noted for his landscapes
- David Henry Souter (1862–1935): artist and journalist
- Clara Southern (1861–1940): painter
- Percy Spence (1868–1933): artist
- John Spooner (born 1946): journalist and illustrator
- Ethel Spowers (1890–1947): artist associated with the Grosvenor School of Modern Art
- William Stanford (1839–1880): sculptor
- Stelarc (born 1946): performance artist
- Ronald Steuart (1898–1988): watercolourist
- Paddy Japaljarri Stewart (1935–2013): indigenous artist from Mungapunju
- Constance Stokes (1906–1991): figurative painter
- Loribelle Spirovski (born 1990): Filipino-born visual artist
- Kunmanara Stewart (c.1935–2012): indigenous Pitjantjatjara artist
- Margaret Stones AM MBE (1920–2018): botanical illustrator
- Tim Storrier (born 1949): landscape painter, winner of 2012 Archibald Prize
- David Edgar Strachan (1919–1970): painter, printmaker and teacher
- George Strafford (c.1820–1896): artist and engraver
- Arthur Streeton (1867–1943): landscape painter
- Mark Strizic (1928–2012): Croatian-Australian photographer and artist
- William Strutt (1825–1915): English-born artist of figurative and history paintings
- Douglas Stubbs (1927–2008): artist
- Reginald Sturgess (1892–1932): artist
- Charles Summers (1825–1878): English-born sculptor, creator of the memorial to the explorers Burke and Wills
- Jane Sutherland (1853–1928): landscape painter
- Ruth Sutherland (1884–1948): painter and art critic
- Chern'ee Sutton (born 1996): painter, known for her colourful 3D painting style.
- Roger Swainston (born 1960): painter, naturalist and zoologist specialising in works of the underwater world
- Ricky Swallow (born 1974): sculptor
- Estelle Mary (Jo) Sweatman (1872–1956): painter
- Eveline Syme (1888–1961): artist associated with the Grosvenor School of Modern Art

Back to top

== T ==
- Laurens Tan (1950–2025): multidisciplinary artist
- Ronald Peter Tandberg (1943–2018): illustrator and political cartoonist
- Les Tanner (1927–2001): cartoonist and journalist
- Howard Taylor AM (1918–2001): painter, potter, graphic artist and teacher of art
- Violet Teague (1872–1951): artist, noted for her painting and printmaking
- Henri Tebbitt (1854–1927): English-Australian painter
- Kathy Temin (born 1968): artist who uses synthetic fur to create sculptural objects and installations
- Arlene Textaqueen (born 1975): works on paper with felt-tip marker pens
- Eric Thake (1904–1982): surrealist artist
- Harold Thomas (born 1947): artist and activist
- Margaret Thomas (1842–1929): English-born Australian travel writer, poet and artist
- Rover Thomas (c.1926–1998): one of two Aboriginal Australians to exhibit in the Venice Biennale in 1990, alongside Trevor Nickolls
- Stu Thomas (born 1967): visual artist, musician
- Christian Thompson (born 1978): artist
- Nigel Thomson (1945–1999): artist of satirical paintings of society
- Lesbia Thorpe (1919–2009); printmaker
- Mark Threadgold (born 1977): painter
- Imants Tillers (born 1950): visual art artist, curator and writer
- Freddie Timms (1946–2017): painter
- Richard Kelly Tipping (born 1949): poet and artist working between image and language
- Kaapa Mbitjana Tjampitjinpa (1925–1989): painter
- Clifford Possum Tjapaltjarri (1932–2002): painter, Aboriginal artist
- Whiskey Tjukangku (born c. 1939): artist
- Turkey Tolson Tjupurrula (c.1938/1942–2001)
- Aida Tomescu (born 1955): contemporary artist
- Mary Tonkin (born 1973): artist, winner of the 2002 Dobell Prize
- Jessie Constance Alicia Traill (1881–1967): printmaker
- Vernon Treweeke (1939–2015): psychedelic artist
- Percy Trezise AM (1923–2005): pilot, painter, explorer and writer
- J. W. Tristram (1870–1938): artist
- Zoja Trofimiuk (born 1952): printmaker and sculptor, especially cast glass
- Percy Trompf (1902–1964): graphic artist
- Marie Tuck (1866–1947): artist and art educator
- Ruth Tuck OAM (1914–2008): modernist painter
- Albert Tucker (1914–1999): Expressionist painter
- Tudor St George Tucker (1862–1906): painter
- Tony Tuckson (1921–1973): war-time pilot turned abstract expressionist painter
- Peter Tully (1947–1992): jeweller, designer and artistic director
- James Alfred Turner (1850–1908): painter
- Isabel May Tweddle (1875–1945): painter

Back to top

== U ==
- Tony Underhill (1923–1977)

Back to top

== V ==
- Angela Valamanesh (born 1953): ceramicist and mixed-media artist
- Hossein Valamanesh (1949–2022): Iranian-born mixed-media artist and sculptor
- May Vale (1862–1945): painter
- Henri Benedictus van Raalte (1881–1929): known as H. van Raalte, English-born artist and printmaker
- Danila Vassilieff (1897–1958): Russian-born painter and sculptor
- John Vickery (1906–1983): artist
- Julie Elizabeth Agnes Vieusseux (1820–1878): painter and educator
- Alfred James Vincent (1874–1915): cartoonist
- Eugene von Guerard (1811–1901): Austrian-born painter of landscapes active in Australia
- Savanhdary Vongpoothorn (born 1971): Laotian-born Australian painter

Back to top

== W ==
- Robert Wade (1930–2024): watercolour artist
- David Wadelton (born 1955): artist
- Thomas Wainewright (1794–1847): English author, serial killer, forger and painter transported to Van Dieman's Land
- Roland Wakelin (1887–1971): New Zealand-born painter and teacher
- Megan Walch (born 1967): painter
- Anna Frances Walker (1830–1913) watercolorist, botanical illustrator
- John Walker (born 1939): English-born painter and printmaker producing native Oceanic art
- Rose A. Walker (1879–1942): painter and miniaturist
- Stephen Walker (1927–2014): sculptor
- Robin Wallace-Crabbe (born 1938): curator, literary reviewer, cartoonist, illustrator, book designer, publisher and a commenter on art
- Mervyn Napier Waller CMG OBE (1893–1972): muralist, mosaicist and painter in stained glass and other media
- Wes Walters (1928–2014): realist portrait painter and abstract artist
- Ania Walwicz (1951–2020): poet, prose writer, and visual artist
- Billy Wara (1920–2008): sculptor, woodworker
- Frederick Charles Ward (1900–1990): designer
- Guy Warren (1921–2024): painter who won the Archibald Prize in 1985
- Sera Waters (born 1979): textile artist, arts writer and arts educator
- Thomas Watling (1762–1814): painter and illustrator
- Jennifer Watson (born 1951): artist known for her paintings that combine text and images
- Judy Watson (born 1959): artist
- Judy Napangardi Watson (1921–2004): painter
- Tommy Watson (c.1935–2017): painter
- James Laurence Watts (1849–1925): sculptor
- Betty Temple Watts (1901–1992): scientific illustrator
- Peter Wegner (born 1953): New Zealand born figurative painter, sculptor, and draughtsman
- Barbara Weir (1945–2023): painter
- William Westall (1781–1850): English-born landscape and botanical artist
- Bradd Westmoreland (born 1975): painter
- Bryan Westwood (1930–2000): portrait artist who won the Archibald Prize twice
- Charles Wheeler (1881–1977): painter who won the Archibald Prize in 1933
- George Whinnen (1891–1950): painter
- Kaylene Whiskey (born 1976): artist
- Anthony White (born 1976): painter
- Cecil John White (1900–1986): New Zealand born cartoonist, known under the pen name Unk White
- James White (1861–1918): sculptor, winner of the Wynne Prize in 1902
- Susan Dorothea White (born 1941): painter, sculptor, printmaker, author
- Brett Whiteley (1939–1992): prolific, multi-award-winning painter
- James V Wigley (1918–1999): painter of Aboriginal camp scenes and desert landscapes
- Leslie Wilkie (1878–1935): artist, curator, and member of Victorian Artists Society
- Fred Williams (1927–1982): painter and printmaker
- Jan Williamson: award-winning portraitist
- Marcus Wills (born 1972): painter, winner of 2006 Archibald Prize
- Dora Wilson (1883–1946): British-born artist, best known for etchings and street scenes
- Eric Wilson (1911–1946): painter
- Shaun Wilson (born 1972): artist, filmmaker, academic, teacher, and curator
- William Hardy Wilson (1881–1955): architect, artist and author
- Henry Winkles (1800–1860)
- Walter Withers (1854–1914): landscape artist and a member of the Heidelberg School of impressionists
- Noel Wood (1912–2001): painter
- Rex Wood (1906–1970): artist who lived for many years in Portugal
- Robert Raymond (Bob) Woodward AM (1923–2010): architect and fountain designer
- John Christie Wright (1889–1917): sculptor

Back to top

== X ==
- Ah Xian (born 1960): Chinese born artist

Back to top

== Y ==
- Paji Honeychild Yankarr (c.1912–2004): painter
- Yirawala (c.1897–1976): painter
- John Zerunge Young (born 1956): Hong Kong-born Australian artist
- Blamire Young (1862–1935): artist
- William Young (1875–1944): artist
- Gulumbu Yunupingu (c.1943–2012): Australian Aboriginal artist and women's leader from the Yolngu people

Back to top

== Z ==
- Anne Zahalka (born 1957): photographer
- Michael Zavros (born 1974): artist
- Victor Zelman (1877–1960): painter and etcher
- Hongbin Zhao (born 1952): Shanghai born artist
- Teisutis 'Joe' Zikaras (1922–1991): Lithuanian-born sculptor
- Salvatore Zofrea (born 1946): Italian-born painter of literary, historical and religious sources
- Reinis Zusters (1919–1999) artist and architect

Back to top

== See also ==
- Australian art
- Australian painter stubs

Schools

- Antipodeans Group
- Heide Circle
- Heidelberg School
- Hermannsburg School
- Merioola Group
