= Tanya Myshkin =

Australian printmaker (born 1961)

Tanya Myshkin (born 21 August 1961) is an Australian printmaker, born in Adelaide, South Australia and based in Canberra. She is a printmaker known for her drawing, wood engraving and etching. Much of her imagery is centred around the natural world.

Her bookwork often responds to works of literature by writers such as Eugène Ionesco. She has produced a number of fine press artist books, in which her prints combine with letterpress text. One such book, Le vierge, le vivace et le bel aujourd'hui (French: The virgin, the vivacious and the beautiful today) by Stéphane Mallarmé, illustrated by Myshkin's wood engravings, was produced in 2012 with letterpress printer Caren Florance (Ampersand Duck). It was collected by University of Melbourne Special Collections and the Bibliothèque nationale de France as well as private collections.

Her works have been shown in major galleries including the National Gallery of Australia, and other of her livres d'artiste have been acquired by the British Library, Queensland State Library and the Australian National University Library.

== Background ==
Myshkin attended the Canberra School of Art from 1989, studying under Gillian Mann and Jorg Schmeisser. In 1996 she was an Artist in Residence in the ANU School of Art Edition and Artist Book Studio with Dianne Fogwell and Petr Herel.

== Exhibitions ==
- Wood Engravings and Drypoints: Megalo Print Studio, ACT (2024)
- Wish You Were here: Megalo Artists in Residence 2013-2023: Megalo Print Studio, ACT (2023)
- 100% Books by Canberra Artists: Watson Arts Centre, ACT (2013)
- Corpus et Anima: The naked body and the human soul: ANCA Gallery, ACT (2012)
- Responses to Life and Death: Victoria Clutterbuck and Tanya Myshkin: Studio One Gallery, ACT. (1993)
- Figurative: An Exhibition of Prints: Studio One Gallery, ACT. (1992)
- Art for Life: Studio One Gallery, ACT (1991)
- Memorandum: Exhibition of Printmaking students from the Canberra School of Art: High Court of Australia, ACT (1990)
