= Paul Davies (artist) =

Australian artist working in Los Angeles

- Born: Paul Davies; 1979 (age 46–47); Australia
- Education: UNSW College of Fine Art, National Art School & UNSW College of Art & Design
- Known for: Painting, sculpture

Paul Davies (born 1979) is an Australian artist working in Los Angeles. Paul Davies work consists of painting and sculpture, created from hand-cut stencils, based in turn on the artists’ own digital photographs.

== Biography ==
Davies spent his childhood on NSW coast, before moving to Sydney. Davies' interest in art began when he was only 7 years old, inspired by drawing Asterix cartoons and Australian artist Jeffrey Smart.

== Education ==
- Masters by Research UNSW College of Fine Arts, 2011–2014.
- Painting Master Class, National Art School, 2006.
- Bachelor of Fine Arts, UNSW College of Fine Arts College of Fine Art, 2000.
- Artist Residency, Cité internationale des arts in Paris, 2013
- Artist Residency, Taliesin west Frank Lloyd Wright school of architecture, Phoenix, Arizona, 2016
