= Simeon Nelson =

Australian sculptor

Simeon Nelson (born 1964) is an Australian sculptor and transdisciplinary artist.

Nelson was born in England in 1964 and came to Australia in 1967. Since 2001 he has lived and worked in London. He is Reader in Sculpture at The University of Hertfordshire, Hatfield, UK and a fellow of the Royal Society of the Arts.

== Work ==
Simeon Nelson was educated at Sydney Grammar School and obtained a Bachelor of Fine Art degree at the Sydney College of the Arts in 1987. Nelson has exhibited extensively since 1986, his most recent solo exhibitions being Mappa Mundi, University of Hertfordshire Galleries, Hatfield, UK and Terroir/Boudoir, Elastic Residence, London, UK (2005). He is currently inaugural artist-in-residence at the Royal Geographical Society, London. His first major London solo exhibition was at the RGS exhibition space on Exhibition Road, London.

His work has been selected for major national and international exhibitions, including the National Gallery of Australia Sculpture Prize, Canberra 2005; The Jerwood Sculpture Prize, London, 2003; Tempered Ground, Museum of Garden History, London (2004); This was the future: Australian Sculpture of the 1950s, 60s 70s and Today, Heide Museum of Modern Art, Melbourne (2003); Australian Perspecta; Between Art and Nature, Ivan Dougherty Gallery, University of New South Wales, Sydney (1997); Systems End: Contemporary Art in Australia, Hakone Museum, Tokyo, Japan and touring (1996–97).

In 1997 he was the Australian representative to the IX Triennial India, New Delhi. Nelson was awarded the Australia Council's New Work Project Grant in 1997, 1998 and 2003, the Australia Council Studio Residency in New York in 1994 and a Pollock-Krasner Foundation Grant in 2000.

He has worked on some major public art projects including "Flume", Ashford Kent, UK, "Proximities:Local histories / Global entanglements", a key public art project commissioned to celebrate the Melbourne 2006 Commonwealth Games; Chifley Square Commission, Sydney 1997; The M4 Freeway Commission, Sydney 2000 and the Progettomoderno Commission, Treviso, Italy, 2002.

He is currently working on major projects in China, Saudi Arabia, Australia and Britain.

== Specific projects ==
His work looks at relationships between nature and technology; how nature is mediated by technology and science on one hand and art on the other.

Nelson has deployed a range of materials, techniques and ideas in his oeuvre. Much of his work looks at the forms, systems and structures of nature, as described and represented by science. The branching of a tree, the root directory of a website or the infinitely intricate tracery of the lungs or vascular system of the human body form a set of important metaphors in his work. They are seen as structurally and conceptually analogous.

These works ask questions such as: how organic (natural) form is appropriated by art, science and design; how their visual codes and models of how the world works become fixed in public consciousness. This concern with the connection between the natural and the artificial manifested in a series of ecological installations in the 1990s including Landscope (The Machine in the Garden) . Representations of nature and nature itself were combined in large scale works that suggest that nature creates art as much as art creates nature.
