= Marie-Claire Baldenweg =

Swiss-Australian artist (born 1954)

Marie-Claire Baldenweg (born 27 March 1954) is a Swiss-Australian contemporary artist.

== Life and work ==
Marie-Claire Baldenweg was born in Switzerland.

Since the early seventies almost all of her oil paintings feature the motif of a plastic shopping bag. Her style is a mix of photorealism and pop-art.

She lives in Byron Bay, is married to musician Pfuri Baldenweg and is the mother of three children.

== Shows ==
- In 1988 the Powerhouse Museum (Hyde Park Barracks) hosted a 6 months solo exhibition called "Carried Away".
- In 2003 the Swiss Stock Exchange hosted a museum-like solo exhibition of her work "Global Market – Bagflags of the World".
- In 2005 the Australian Stock Exchange hosted a museum-like solo exhibition of her work "Global Market – Bagflags of the World".

== Quotes ==
- The queen of plastic bag art, Marie-Claire Baldenweg. (Sunday Telegraph, Australia, 02/2005)
- Marie-Claire could be thought of as working in a kind of latter-day Pop art style both celebrating the possibilities of globalisation while critiquing its unkinder aspects. (Anthony Bond, Director Curatorial and Head Curator International Art, Art Gallery of New South Wales)
- For the Swiss artist Marie-Claire Baldenweg plastic carrier bags are "a typical symbol of our capitalistic high gloss- and hi-tech era." (ART Magazin, Germany, 11/2003)
