= Derek Kreckler =

Australian visual artist (born 1952)

- Born: 1952 (age 73–74); Sydney, Australia
- Known for: Visual art
- Movement: Contemporary art
- Awards: New Media Arts Board Fellowship, Australia Council for the Arts (2000)

Derek Kreckler (born 1952, Sydney) is an Australian visual artist. He has worked in a variety of media, creating performance, video, sound and photographic artworks. His work examines the ongoing transformation of modes of historical avant-gardism into the present. His "clean, crisp Cibachromes" of refrigerators were exhibited at the 14th Sydney Biennale in 2004.

He has exhibited internationally, extensively throughout Australia including: 2020 '100 Ways to live a minute', The Pushkin Museum, Moscow; Accident & Process (photographs only) 2018 European Month of Photography, Berlin; Accident & Process: 2017 Jarvis Dooney gallery Berlin, Accident & Process: 2015-2018 regional solo touring exhibition of eight Australian galleries; 'Littoral' LandSeaSky: 2014-15 One and J. Gallery Seoul, OCAT Shanghai, Guangzhou and the National Art School Sydney; 'Many a Slip' 2013 The William and Winifred Bowness Photographic Awards, Monash Gallery of Art, Melbourne; 'White Goods' On Reason and Emotion: 2004 Biennale of Sydney, The Museum of Contemporary Art, Sydney; 'Holey' #1 The 2004 Adelaide Biennale of Australian Art at the Art Gallery of South Australia, and the 2003 Clemenger Contemporary Art Award at the National Gallery of Victoria in Melbourne; 'White Pointer' 1992 Encounters with Diversity, PS1. New York, 'FILL' & 'Chinese Whispers' 1990 Biennale of Sydney, "The Readymade Boomerang: Certain Relations in 20th Century Art"; 'Told by an Idiot' National Review of Live Art Glasgow, UK.

His work is represented in various Australian collections including: Maitland Regional Art Gallery; The Art Gallery of Western Australia, The Art Gallery of South Australia, The Pushkin Museum, Moscow. MACBA Museum of Contemporary Art, Barcelona. The Museum of Contemporary Art, Sydney. Wesfarmers Collection, Perth Western Australia, Archive of the Arts and Humanities Data Service (AHDS), Mitchell Library, Sydney, Australia, The University of Adelaide Library, The Griffith Artworks Collection, National Gallery of Australia and private collections.

He was awarded a New Media Arts Board Fellowship from the Australia Council for the Arts in 2000.

== Bibliography ==
- 2007 – "Out of Time: Essays Between Art and Photography, Blair French, pub Contemporary Art Centre South Australia. Adelaide.
- 2004 – 'Holysmoke', Mike Parr, Art and Australia, Artist's Choice, p. 204 Vol 42 No 2 Summer 2004
- 2004 – 'Derek Kreckler: Allegories of Vision', Blair French, Biennale of Sydney catalogue.
- 2004 – 'Derek Kreckler', John Mateer, Adelaide Biennale of Australian Art catalogue
- 2003 – 'Derek Kreckler', Isobel Cromby, Clemenger Contemporary Art Awards Catalogue. National Gallery of Victoria.
- 2002 – Art Monthly Australia (Scholarly/Periodical); Philippa Kelly (Australia); Dec *2001-Feb 2002, 4 (colour illus.), 'Naturalisation: recent Australian art and the natural' by John Mateer, pg. 4–7.
- 1994 – 25 years of Performance Art in Australia', Nicholas Waterlow catalogue. Ivan Dougherty Gallery, University of New South Wales.
