= Mark Threadgold =

Australian painter

- Born: 1977 (age 48–49)
- Known for: Painting
- Awards: Corangamarah Art Prize; 2008
- Website: http://www.threadgoldart.com/Artist/artist_page.htm

Mark Threadgold (born 1977) is a contemporary Australian painter. Threadgold lives and works in Melbourne. He won the 2008 Corangamarah Art Prize and was selected as a finalist in the Metro 5 Art Award, Australia's richest art prize for Australian artist's under the age of 35 in 2005, 2006, and 2007. His work is held in public collections in Australia and in private collections around the world. He has exhibited in selected group shows and solo exhibitions throughout Australia since 1998.

He has studied visual arts at Deakin University. He then studied education and teaching at the University of Melbourne (2013).

== Influences and Style ==
Themes of life, mortality, routine and work are explored in Mark Threadgold's paintings. Multiple interpretations are often discovered in his work where subjects are carefully constructed and allegories are formed. While Threadgold's earlier paintings were realistic in style, his more recent work since explores more abstract styles, including romanticism, intending to create emotional engagement. His affinity with past masters is evident in his technical expertise. Traces of Caravaggesque naturalism and moody romanticism, combined with the textural invention of the artist, situate his work at the end of a linear history of painting. His work is influenced by artists such as Gerhard Richter, Francis Bacon, Caravaggio, Damien Hirst and Richard Prince.

== Art Awards ==
2011 Sunshine Coast Art Prize, Finalist 2009 Prometheus Art Award, Finalist
2008 Corangamarah Art Prize, Winner
2007 Metro 5 Art Award, Finalist
2006 Metro 5 Art Award, Finalist
2005 Lloyd Rees Memorial Art Prize, Finalist
2005 Metro 5 Art Award, Finalist
1998 Darian Art Prize Deakin University, Winner

== Solo exhibitions ==
- 2018 Metacognition, James Makin Gallery, Melbourne
- 2016 Mark Threadgold, James Makin Gallery, Melbourne
- 2010 The New Now, Metro Gallery, Melbourne
- 2008 Twice A Day Every Day For the Rest of Your Life, Metro Gallery, Melbourne
- 2003 New Paintings, Intrude Gallery, Melbourne
- 2002 Mark Threadgold, St Lawrences, Norwich, England
- 2001 Mark Threadgold, Preview Gallery, Melbourne
