= George Strafford =

Australian artist and engraver

George Strafford (c.1820-13 February 1896) was an Australian artist and engraver, active from 1840 to c.1860. Born in India, he moved to Australia in 1851. He is best known for his engraving View of Melbourne (1865), which was published by De Gruchy and Leigh. Under Thomas Ham he contributed to the Australian Illustrated Magazine. Strafford suffered from mental illness and was committed to Carlton Asylum, Kew Asylum and Yarra Bend Asylum. He continued to draw at Yarra Bend, and became known as 'the mad artist'. He died at Beechworth Asylum in Victoria.

His work is held in the British Museum, National Gallery of Victoria and the State Library of Victoria.

== Life ==
He studied in England under the engraver Edward Goodall. With Goodall’s sons, Edward the younger and Frederick, he visited France in the early 1840s on a sketching tour. He exhibited paintings of French scenes at London’s Royal Academy in 1842, 1844 and 1845 and at the British Institution in 1844, at which time he was living at 6 Jeffrey’s Terrace, Kentish Town. Strafford was acquainted with John Ruskin, who thought so highly of him that he employed him to make designs for his Shield of Achilles. By the mid-1840s he was producing imaginative designs, sketches of Gothic fantasy and visions compared with those by William Blake. In 1847 he married Mary Hemmings in Paris.

By the late 1840s Strafford was suffering from hallucinations and showing signs of mental instability, which was evident in his work. His failing health and a weakness in his lungs led to his emigration to Melbourne in 1851 where he was employed by Thomas Ham to produce engraved illustrations – The Water Seeker, The Gold Seeker and Gold Digger of Victoria – for the Illustrated Australian Magazine. Later he worked for De Gruchy & Leigh, for whom he produced the engraving Melbourne 1856 Taken from the South Side of the Yarra. Samuel Calvert also employed him in the late 1850s, particularly for drawing on wood. At least twelve of his drawings were reproduced as wood-engravings in the Newsletter of Australasia between 1859 and 1861 and the surrounds of the cover illustration used on some issues was also to his design.

=== Mental illness and death ===
Strafford’s wife died on 21 August 1857, leaving him with no kin in the colony of Australia. By August 1861 his mental instability, accentuated by her death, had increased to such an extent that John J. Mouritz, the Baptist minister of Fitzroy, petitioned for his entry into the Yarra Bend Lunatic Asylum; he was admitted on 27 September. He was discharged into Mouritz’s care in December 1864 but after Mouritz’s death was readmitted on 1 June 1869 on the petition of Samuel Calvert, listed in the asylum records as the patient’s friend. Strafford was transferred to Carlton Asylum in May 1871, to Kew in June 1873 and to Beechworth on 9 February 1876. He died in the Beechworth Asylum on 13 February 1896, completely forgotten by the Victorian art community. His age at death was given as sixty-six, but he must have been about ten years older since he was exhibiting in the 1840s.

== Collections ==
Three of Strafford’s English paintings as well as works by Edward Goodall from Strafford’s collection were included in the 1869 Melbourne Public Library Art Exhibition. Strafford’s art collection, including his sketchbooks, was then in the hands of Calvert, who put it up for auction in February 1872. In 1888 the National Gallery of Victoria purchased two of his watercolours for 2 guineas each, St. Paul’s Church and Old Princes Bridge, in 1854, from East of Swanston Street and Police Station, Richmond Paddock 1854 (now La Trobe Collection, State Library of Victoria, Melbourne). In 1904 Calvert presented four of Strafford’s works to the British Museum; Design for a fountain 1857, Tritons, Britannia Letting Australia Walk Alone and a watercolour Study of a Boat.
