= Thomas Peerless =

English-born Australian artist

Thomas (Tom) Peerless (1858–1896) was an Australian artist who painted primarily in watercolour. He signed his paintings "T. Peerless" or, less frequently, with his initials "T. P."

== Biography ==
Peerless was born in Brighton, England on 18 March 1858 the eldest son of fourteen children born to David John Peerless and his wife Emily (nee Pockney). He emigrated to Australia arriving in Sydney about 1880.

He typically painted scenes of the Blue Mountains (New South Wales) and New Zealand landscapes. In 1895 three of his paintings were selected for inclusion in the Opening Exhibition of the Queensland National Art Gallery in Brisbane but his death from tuberculosis the following year at age 38 prematurely ended his promising painting career. He is represented in the collections of the Auckland Art Gallery, University of Otago Library (Hocken Collections), Manly Art Gallery and Museum, Mitchell Library, State Library of New South Wales and National Library of Australia.

Peerless died in Albury on 30 April 1896 and was survived by his wife Mary and daughters Constance and Elsie.

== Gallery ==
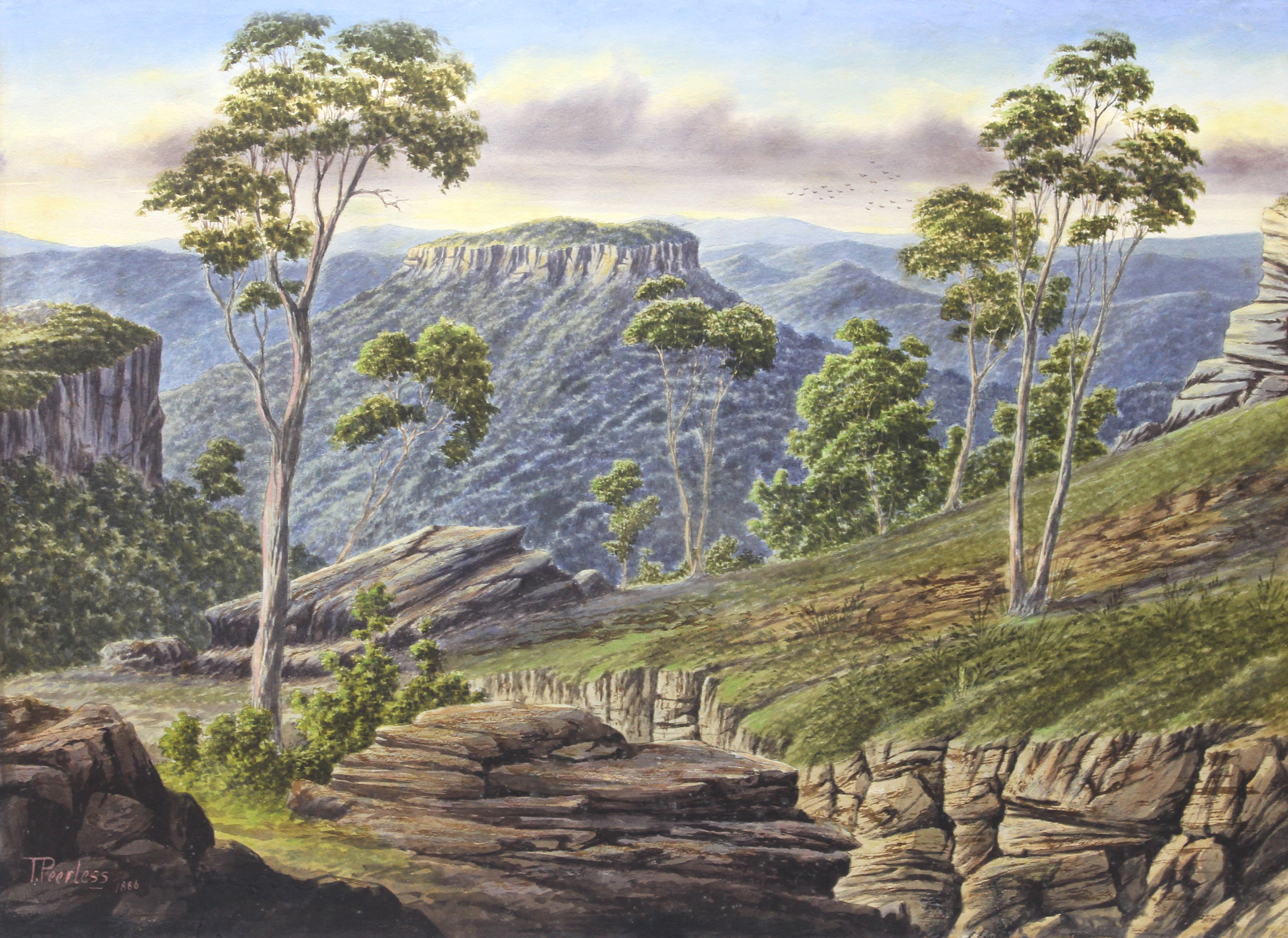
Blue Mountains, New South Wales (1886).

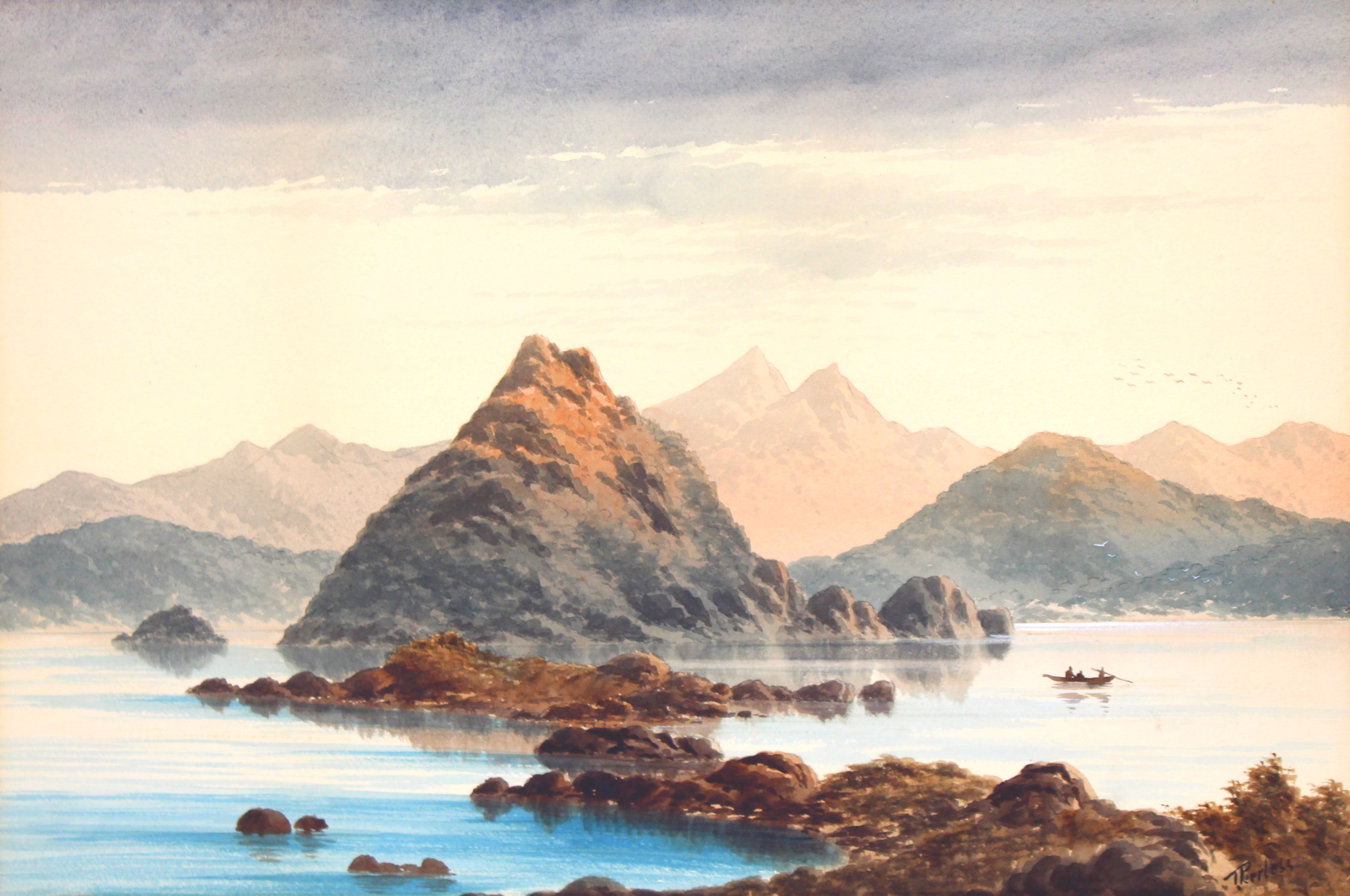
Lake Taupo, Auckland, New Zealand.
