= Rebecca Shanahan =

Australian artist and arts educator

Rebecca Shanahan is a New South Wales-based artist and arts educator whose work has been exhibited at a number of art galleries across Australia and who has also written for a range of outlets. In 2006, Shanahan described herself as being "interested in photographic space, time and surface" for an extensive research project funded by the Australian Research Council.

Her photographic portrait 'untitled' was a finalist for the Art Gallery of New South Wales' 2004 Photographic Portrait Prize. In 2015, judges for the Fremantle Arts Centre Print Award gave a high commendation to Shanahan's ode to the book I had but Could not Keep.

Shanahan's writing has appeared in publications such as Art Guide Australia and Mamamia.

Shanahan had an exhibition Homelands, which she developed with fellow artist Damian Dillon. An illustrated book of the exhibition is stored in the National Library of Australia.
