= Christine Morrow =

Australian artist (born 1971)

Christine Morrow is an Australian artist, born in the UK in 1971 to a French mother and British father.

Her art work has been exhibited in the Adelaide Biennial of Australian Art in 1998 and the Moët & Chandon touring exhibition in 1999. In 2003, she was commissioned by the Australian Centre for Contemporary Art to make new work for the Exhibition New '03. In 1997, she curated the exhibition ex. cat. which presented the work of artists who had a connection with Roman Catholicism as part of the official program of the Brisbane Festival.

In 2003, she co-founded the gallery Blindside in Melbourne, Australia. Between 2006 and 2009 she was curator at the Museum of Contemporary Art, Sydney, Morrow curated the exhibitions "Primavera 07" in 2007, and "I walk the line: new Australian drawing" in 2009. Morrow was invited by the organisers of the 2009 10th Havana Biennial to select and present the Australian artists. In 2009, on the occasion of the anniversary of Charles Darwin's publication of On the Origin of Species, she curated the exhibition "Darwin's Bastards."

In 2012, Morrow was appointed to the position of Director of the Australian Experimental Art Foundation, a contemporary organisation with a gallery, bookshop and studios.
