= Lyn Hancock =

Australian-Canadian photographer, writer

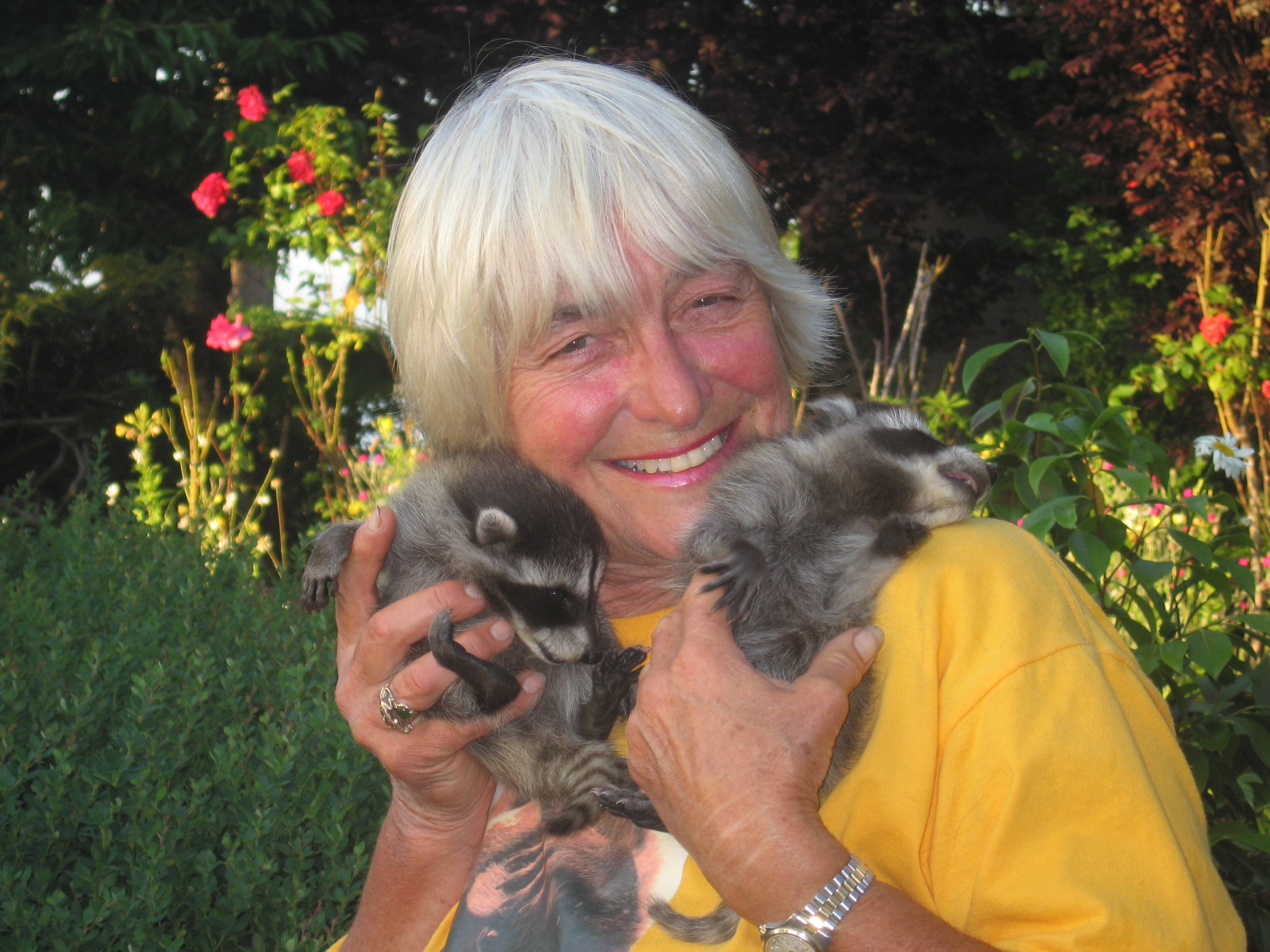
- Occupation: Author
- Writing career
- Period: 1972–present
- Website: lynhancock.com

Lyn Hancock is an Australian-Canadian photojournalist, wildlife photographer, and book author.

She has raised numerous orphaned wild animals, including bears, cougars, eagles, puffins, raccoons, and seals; her experiences while doing so have formed the basis of her 20 books, including There's a Seal in my Sleeping Bag, There's a Raccoon in my Parka, Love Affair with a Cougar, and Tabasco the Saucy Raccoon.

She has also written travel literature describing her experiences in the Canadian North.

Simon Fraser University awarded her one of the 2009 Outstanding Alumni Awards for Arts & Culture.

== Books written ==
- There's a Seal in my Sleeping Bag (1972)
- Pacific Wilderness/Wild Islands (1974)
- The Mighty Mackenzie (1974)
- There's a Raccoon in my Parka (1977)
- Love Affair with a Cougar (1978)
- An Ape Came out of my Hatbox (1979)
- Vanderhoof the Town that Wouldn't Wait (1979)
- Gypsy in the Classroom (1980)
- Tell Me, Grandmother (1985)
- Northwest Territories: Canada's Last Frontier (1986)
- Alaska Highway: Road to Adventure (1988)
- Nunavut (1995)
- Looking for the Wild (1996)
- Winging It in the North (1996)
- Yukon (1996)
- Northwest Territories (1997)
- Western Canada Travel Smart (1998)
- Destination Vancouver: a Port City (1998)
- Tabasco the Saucy Raccoon (2006)
- The Ring: Memories of a Metis Grandmother (2010)

== Awards ==
For There is a Raccoon in my Parka:

- 1978: Francis H. Kortright Conservation Award for Excellence in Outdoor Writing
- 1977: Authors' Literary Guild choice
- 1977: Doubleday Book of the Month Club choice

For There's a Seal in my Sleeping Bag:

- 1973: Pacific Northwest Booksellers' Award
- 1972: Book of the Month Club alternate selection

For Tabasco the Saucy Raccoon

- 2007: Nominated for the Diamond Willow Award

For General Writing - Contributions to Arts, Culture & Education

- 2010: Outstanding Alumni of the Year Award - Simon Fraser University
