= Olive Dutton Green =

Australian artist (1878–1930)

Olive Dutton Green (February 1878 – 5 July 1930) was a noted Australian artist, born in Adelaide, a daughter of politician and real-estate agent George Dutton Green (1850–1911).

She moved to London around 1910. She studied under Frank Spenlove-Spenlove and painted in post-impressionist style.

Exhibited in Adelaide, London Paris. Member of the South Australian Society of Arts; Society of Women Artists; Royal Institute of Oil Painters.

Dutton Green died in Hampstead, London after a long illness.
