= Robert Boyed Mitchell =

Australian artist (1919–2002)

Robert Boyed Mitchell (19 December 1919 – 19 March 2002) is an Australian artist who dedicated his life to his art practice without getting recognition during his lifetime. He experienced his first creative surge in the most difficult of circumstances: as a prisoner of war during World War II, drawing his surroundings, and despite adversity, inspired by the beauty of Japan. After the war, Robert Mitchell studied art at East Sydney Technical College, together with fellow art students John Coburn, Jon Molvig, Jean Weir, Stan De Teliga. Frank Hinder was among his teachers and became a lifelong friend.

Robert Mitchell was one of the first Australian artists to embrace abstract expressionism, exemplified by the likes of Jackson Pollock and Willem de Kooning. Robert Mitchell drew inspiration from a variety of sources: current art movements, architecture, Japan, but also advertising and fashion. In his hands, these influences merged into something completely unique and individual, culminating in his Collage Paintings, evoking the joy, spirit and happiness of creation and life itself.

Mitchell exhibited regularly in group shows in the 1940s and 1950s and was posthumously honoured in 2004 with a solo exhibition at the Mosman Art Gallery, Sydney, and at the Ken Done Gallery, Sydney.

== Curriculum Vitae ==
19 December 1919: Robert Boyed Mitchell born in Cobar, country New South Wales, the youngest of seven brothers and sisters

1920's: Primary School, Leeton. Family moves to Bankstown and buys newsagency in Marrickville

1930s: Both parents die. Newsagency provides Mitchell children with survival

1920s-1930's: School, Marrickville. Repeats 6th class, no high school formation. Mitchell first encounters art through reproductions in English, American and Australian magazines

1941: Joins army and volunteers for AIF, 8th division, Signals. Sees Tom Bass drawing in Salvation Army Tent.

February 1942: POW at Changi, Singapore. First drawings. Enrols in art class under Murray Griffin in POW camp

December 1942: volunteers to be moved to Japan. POW at Takatori Michi, suburb of Kobe. Takes to beauty of Japan immediately: architecture, landscape and cultivation

1945: After release and return to Australia, fails first attempt to enter East Sydney Technical College, National Art School to study in the Commonwealth Reconstruction Training Scheme

1947–1949: Studies in evening classes at East Sydney Technical College, Strathfield Campus. Fellow students and friends include John Coburn, Jon Molvig, Jean Weir, Bob White, Bert Flugelman, Cynthia Muller, Charles Doutney, Stan de Teliga

1948: Wallace Thornton introduces Pierre Bonnard to art students: "a shock"

1949: Exhibits with "Strath Art Group", Hyde Park. Exhibits in Mosman Art Prize

1949: Leaves Australia with John Molvig and friends before final exams

1950: London, spends April – June 1950 in Cassis, France

1951: Visits to London, France, Toronto, New York. Disappointed not to see Abstract Expressionism at Museum of Modern Art in New York. Fascinated by Jackson Pollock's and Willem de Kooning's work

1951–1961: Lives in Toronto, Canada, with frequent visits to New York. Sent paintings from Canada to Sydney exhibitions.

1952 and 54: Exhibits in "Strath Art Group", 4th and 6th annual exhibitions, Hyde Park, Sydney

1961–1980: Lives in London. Interested in Pop art scene

1980s: Returns to Sydney to live in Neutral Bay. Dedicates himself fully to creating art. Develops mature style. Interviewed by Betty Churcher for her book "Molvig, the Lost Antipodean", 1984, including references to Robert Mitchell

1990s: Continues his art practice, concentrating in late years on small works and photography

19 March 2002: Dies Sydney, aged 82

== Represented ==
- Art Gallery of New South Wales, Sydney
- Mosman Art Gallery, Mosman
- Numerous private collections in Australia

== Exhibitions ==
- 1948, 6–24 November: 10th Annual Interstate Exhibition, Contemporary Art Society
- 1949 "Strath Art Group”, Hyde Park. Mosman Art Prize, enters "Dee Why Landscape"
- 1952 "Strath Art Group", 4th annual exhibition, October, Hyde Park, Sydney
- 1954 "Strath Art Group", 6th annual exhibition, Hyde Park, Sydney
- 7 February – 20 March 2004: Abstraction and Obsession - The Collage Paintings of Bob Mitchell, Mosman Art Gallery, Sydney
- November 2004: The Collage Paintings of Bob Mitchell, Ken Done Gallery, The Rocks, Sydney
- July 2008: Special Forces, National Art School, Sydney
