= Henry Rayner =

Australian artist

Henry Rayner (19 September 1902 – 25 April 1957) was an Australian artist known for his drypoint etchings. He produced more than 500 original drypoint works.

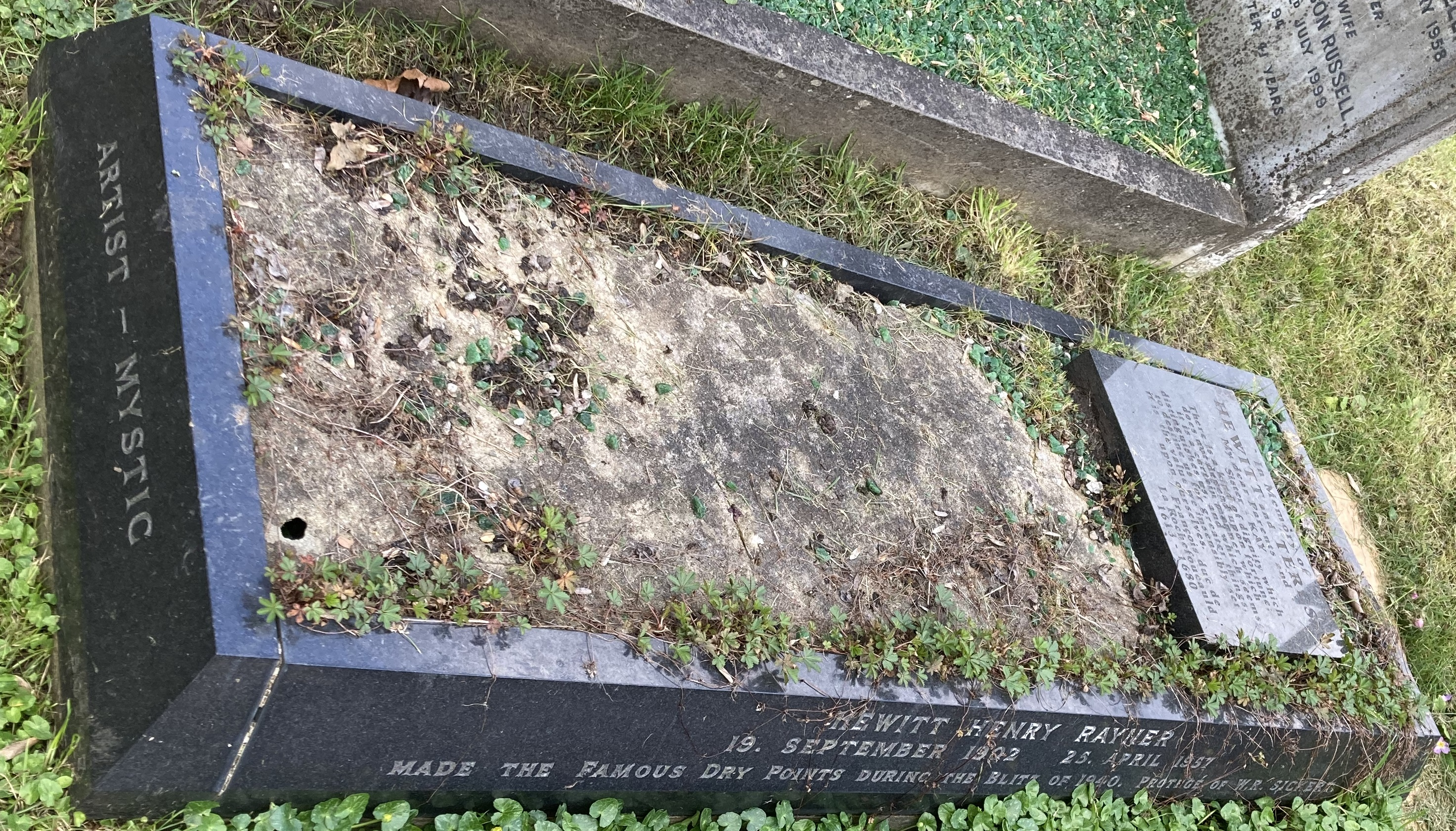
Grave of Henry Rayner in Highgate Cemetery

== Biography ==
Hewitt Henry Rayner was born in Melbourne, Australia and trained as an artist in Britain at London's Royal Academy schools.

He was commonly known as Henry Rayner, the Australian artist born on September 19, 1902, in Hawthorn, Melbourne. He developed a keen interest in art at an early age, which led him to pursue formal training in Britain. After moving there in 1923, he trained under notable artists, including Walter Sickert, although he never completed his formal education at the Royal Academy Schools. Instead, he began his career as a printmaker, specializing in drypoint etching.

In 1928, he married and had two girls with his wife.

In 1938, he sketched a self-portrait which is now in the Royal Collection. Some of his other works are also in the collections of the British Museum and the Victoria and Albert Museum.

He worked with Walter Sickert and was a friend of Augustus John. He was injured during the London blitz and thereafter became something of a recluse.

He died on 25 April 1957, having committed suicide following a period of depression. He is buried on the eastern side of Highgate Cemetery.
