= Joanne Mitchelson =

Australian artist (born 1971)

- Born: 7 January 1971 (age 55); Tasmania, Australia
- Occupation: Artist
- Known for: Watercolour art

Joanne Mitchelson (born 7 January 1971) is a Tasmanian-born artist whose watercolours focus on the natural environment of Tasmania.

Joanne was raised near Westbury, Tasmania, on her parents' farm.

Joannes paintings can be found with many private collections, the Tasmanian Queen Victoria Museum and Art Gallery in Launceston, the Artists Garret in Deloraine, Tasmania, the Tasmanian Design Centre in Launceston, and the Ulverstone Civic Centre.

In 2008, she was one of the principal exhibitors at the Tasmanian Craft Fair Deloraine, Tasmania, and in 2007 was the runner-up in the John Glover Art Award.

== Art award ==
- For the watercolour Deep Reflection, by the pool of Salome, Walls of Jerusalem National ... Joanna Mitchelson Deep Reflections (commended) http://www.taswatercolours.com.au/aboutartist.htm%5B%5D Tasmanian Water Colour Artists]
