= Roy Parkinson =

Australian artist

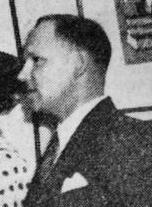
- Born: 1901
- Died: 1945 (aged 43–44)

Roy Philip Parkinson (3 June 1901 – 9 May 1945) was an Australian artist, known for his watercolour paintings. His works are collected in a number of Australian galleries.

== Early life ==
Roy Parkinson was born in Brisbane, Queensland on 3 June 1901 to parents Cyril Parkinson and his wife Jane Silcock. He studied at Brisbane State High School and later studied art at the Brisbane Central Technical College under F. J. Martyn Roberts. He also took lessons from William Bustard and Hubert Jarvis.

Parkinson exhibited his work in Brisbane, Sydney and Melbourne and travelled to Victoria to take in different subjects for his paintings. At an exhibition in 1930, 49 of his works were sold, a record for sales at a private exhibition at that point. One of his works was submitted to the Coronation Exhibition in London in 1937, along with other significant Queensland artists of the period, including Vida Lahey. He was President of the Royal Queensland Art Society in 1934.Archive

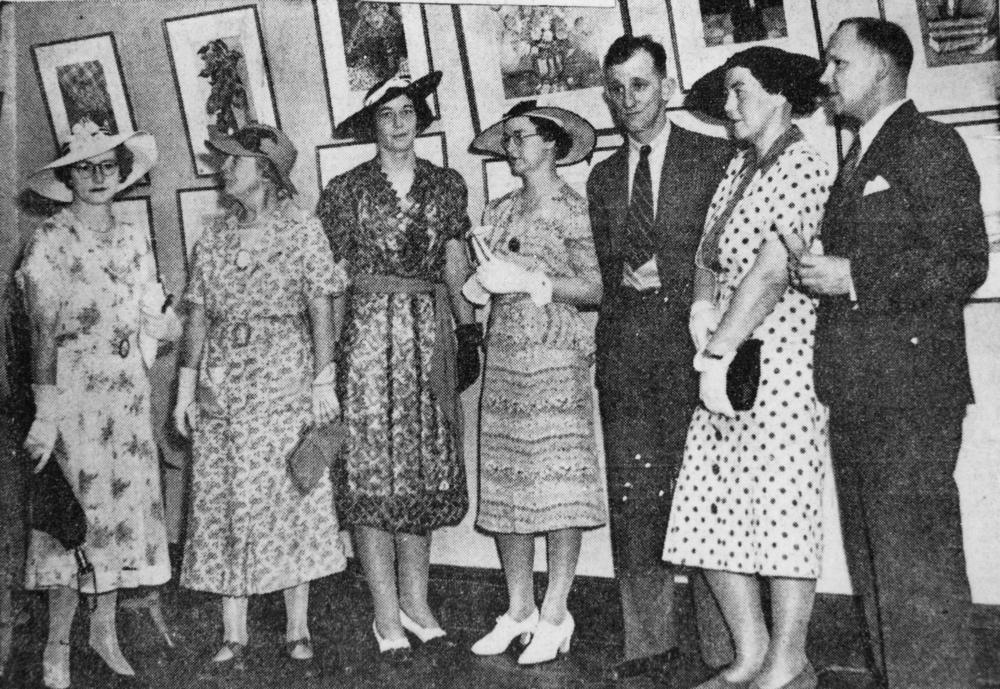
Roy Parkinson (far right) and his pupils at the Gainsborough Gallery, Brisbane, Queensland, 1937 Courtesy: State Library of Queensland 1 121004

Parkinson taught art and was an art critic for the local newspapers. He applied to be a war artist during World War II. The book Praise life and practise art, which was published posthumously in 1946 represented a collection of the transcripts of some of his radio interviews on various topics.

== Legacy ==
Parkinson married Gladys Ann Canning in 1928. He died 9 May 1945, after suffering from ill health and was survived by his wife.

=== Collections ===
- Art Gallery of South Australia
- National Gallery of Victoria
- Queensland Art Gallery
- Castlemaine Art Museum

=== Archive ===
Parkinson's papers including photographs of some of his work are held in the Fryer Library of The University of Queensland.
