= Merran Esson =

Australian ceramicist (1950–2022)

- Born: Merran Esson; 1950; Tumbarumba, New South Wales, Australia
- Died: 18 June 2022 (aged 71–72)
- Education: Caulfield Institute of Technology
- Known for: Ceramic Art

Merran Esson (1950–2022) was an Australian ceramicist known for her colourful ceramic pieces influenced by country New South Wales and the urban landscape of Sydney.

== Early life ==
Esson was born in 1950 in Tumbarumba, in country New South Wales. In her early years her observations of the clash of natural landscapes and human interventions during glider flights with her father contributed significantly to her practice later in life.

In 1973, she was introduced to ceramics at Bendigo Pottery and was also influenced by the art style of Australian ceramic sculptor, Marea Gazzard.

In 1974 she attended art school at Caulfield Institute of Technology, earning a Diploma in Art and Design and 1983 received a Workshop Development Grant from the Crafts Board of the Australia Council.

== Career ==
Esson's artistic journey was shaped by her practical experiences and a fascination with the material transformation of clay. Growing up in country New South Wales, her art was influenced by her childhood observations of the clash of humans and nature.

Merging traditional ceramic practices with contemporary themes, and leveraging off of unexpected firing results, lead Esson to experiment with new materials to achieve vibrant effects.

Speaking during an interview in 2016, Esson states how much she enjoyed the problem-solving process associated with creating with clay.:

Science didn’t interest me at school but I found science as related to ceramics, geology and alchemy to be very intriguing. I think we don’t always choose our influences, they somehow choose us.

— Merran Esson, Artist Profile, Issue 37, 2016. Interview with Sarah Sweet.

Embracing both industrial and natural elements, her large hand-built artworks and signature textural surfaces often sought to resemble the natural phenomena that relate to aging and the passage of time. Water tanks featured heavily in her work and the patina created on them from use and age.

As an educator, she began her teaching career at Kambala Girls School and went on to teach at institutions both in Australia and nationally, including the Edinburgh College of Art in Scotland, the Central Academy of Fine Arts in Beijing, University of NSW Art and Design, the Australian Catholic University, and the National Art School in Sydney, where she served as Head of Ceramics from 1997.

From 2016 until her death, Esson was a member of the International Academy of Ceramics in Geneva, Switzerland.

== Personal life ==
In 2020 artist, Susan Doherty painted her portrait for the Archibald Prize. It was included in the 2020 Salon des Refusés.

Esson was diagnosed with a brain tumour in 2020 and died on 18 June 2022 at the age of 72.

== Publications ==
- Esson, M., & Esson, K. (2020). Merran Esson: A life of collecting. Ceramics: Art and Perception, (116), 100–105. https://search.informit.org/doi/10.3316/informit.581236924054743
- Esson, M. (2015). Vessels from the high country. Journal of Australian Ceramics, 54(3), 44–45. https://search.informit.org/doi/10.3316/informit.649083684195128
- Esson, M. (2016). The stuff of life. Journal of Australian Ceramics, 55(2), 16–21. https://search.informit.org/doi/10.3316/informit.220668722836459
- Esson, M. (2014). One foot on the black. Ceramics: Art and Perception, (95), 44–49. https://search.informit.org/doi/10.3316/ielapa.202065756929786
- Esson, M. (2005). Hae-Sin Ro’s Ceramic Multiples. Ceramics: Art and Perception, (60), 16–18. https://search.informit.org/doi/10.3316/ielapa.937336712081389

== Awards and recognition ==
- 1994 - Austceram Award
- 2005 - 24th Gold Coast International Ceramic Award
- 2006 - National Art School's Studio Residency Cite Internationale Des Arts in Paris
- 2008 - Shepparton Ceramic Award's Poyntzpass Pioneers Award of Merit
- 2016 - Distinguished Teaching Award, National Art School
- 2019 - Muswellbrook Art Prize Ceramics
- 2019 - Woollahra Small Sculpture Prize
- 2000 - Port Hackers Potters Award
