= Robin Blau =

Australian artist

Robin Blau (born 1946) is an Australian artist based in Sydney.

Blau graduated in sculpture and jewellery from Sydney College of the Arts.

== Work ==
In 1986, Blau was commissioned to make two coats of arms sculptures for Parliament House, Canberra as gifts from the Parliament and people of New South Wales. Standing at 3.9 metres tall the stainless steel sculpture contains more than 700 precision welds.

Blau's prominent public commissions have included;

- Coat of Arms, Parliament House, Canberra, 1986
- Notice Posting Column, New Acton precinct, Canberra, 2009
- Time Thief & Bower, New Acton precinct, Canberra, 2011
- Untitled sculpture, University of Canberra, 2012
- Aureole, St Patrick's Cathedral, Parramatta
- Entry gates, St Patrick's Cathedral, Parramatta
- Tabernacle, St Patrick's Cathedral, Parramatta
- Cross with Corpus, St Patrick's Cathedral, Parramatta
