= Paul Margocsy =

Australian artist

Paul Margocsy (born 1945) is an Australian artist, known primarily for his watercolour paintings of Australian birds. Though he has never received any formal art training, he is internationally recognised as one of Australia's best wildlife artists. His art is collected both in Australia and internationally alike.

== Personal life ==
Margocsy was born in Melbourne in August 1945, and loved to draw from an early age. When he left school, he began window dressing at Myer in Melbourne, and was called for 2 years' conscript service in 1966, serving one year overseas in the army.

He went to England in 1971, and spent three years there travelling and working before returning to Australia and marrying in 1974. The same year, he began painting murals for children's nurseries. By 1978, he had made painting wildlife his specialty, and joined the "Wildlife Art Society of Australia" a few years later. After research into ornithology, and through his own self-taught efforts and experimentation, he began to develop the skills he is admired for today.

Margocsy and his wife have a son and daughter.

== Art style ==
Margocsy is renowned for the exceptional detail he paints in. He is often described as a fine painter, whose technical skill and artistry shine through in every piece he creates. His paintings are so lifelike that people have said that the viewer sees the bird, rather than the painting.

Margocsy depicts an incredible amount of charm and personality in his subjects, along with the exquisite detail he is known for. Often, his paintings come with a whimsical "song like" name, that adds to the character of the painting itself.

== Career ==
Since he first became engrossed in wildlife art in 1978, Margocsy has staged many exhibitions, and won many awards. Some of his achievements include:

- Best Painting at the Wildlife Art Society of Australia exhibition (1986)
- Best Watercolour exhibit at the Wildlife Art Society of Australia exhibition (1987)
- Included in a book that presented 70 of the best living, traditional realist artists in Australia (1990)
- Commissioned by Australia Post for a stamp issue of waterbirds (1991)
- Staged a successful exhibition in London (1991)
- A featured artist at Omell Galleries in London (1992–1993)
- Best Painting at the Wildlife Art Society of Australia exhibition (1994)
- Commissioned by the United Nations for an endangered species series released in Vienna (1994)
- Paul released a book of his art to coincide with a solo show at the Landmarks Gallery in Milwaukee, Wisconsin (1994)
- Successful solo exhibitions in Osaka, Japan (1996–1997)
- Exhibitions at the prestigious Raffles Hotel in Singapore (1996 and 1998)
- Paul has been chosen twice to exhibit at the Leigh Yawkey Woodson Art Museum "Birds in Art" show in the United States, as one of only 80 artists (from over 3500 entries) to be selected to tour for a year each. Paul is the third Australian artist in 20 years to be selected for this exhibition, and the only Australian artist to be selected twice.
- Solo show in Hong Kong (2006)

Margocsy exhibits around the globe regularly, and particularly in Australia and the United States.
