= Jackie Kurltjunyintja Giles =

Jackie Kurltjunyintja Giles (January 1, 1944 – February 16, 2010) was a Manyjilyjarra artist.

His work is included in the Art Gallery of New South Wales, the National Gallery of Victoria and the Seattle Art Museum.
