= Allana Beltran =

Australian artist

Allana Volante Beltran
- Website: allanabeltran.com

Allana Beltran is an Australian performance artist and environmental activist. She is known as the "Weld Angel" for her protests on behalf of old-growth forest in the Weld Valley.

== Early life ==
Beltran grew up on the Central Coast of New South Wales and completed her degree in Contemporary fine art at Sydney College of the Arts. She specialised in Sculpture, Performance and Installation Art.

== Work ==
Beltran has worked with community groups to create art which raises environmental awareness. The Chain Valley Bay Eco-Arts garden was a community artwork coordinated by the Wyong Neighbourhood Centre Creative Connections project.

Beltran has produced two documentary films, Whatever you love you are and Since the Weld was Flooded, about activists in Tasmania's Southern Forests.

== Weld Angel incident ==
In November 2006, Beltran participated in a long-term protest against logging of old growth forest in the Weld Valley Activists had for some time accused Forestry Tasmania of allowing illegal logging practices to occur in World Heritage-valued forests. By March, most of her fellow protesters had been arrested.

On March 29, Beltran, dressed as an angel and suspended off the ground on a tripod, blocked an entrance to the forest. Her protest was considered peaceful. Though ordered down by police, Beltran blocked the loggers' advance for over nine hours before her eventual arrest. Due to the widespread use of her image in regional media coverage of old growth logging, she has been described as "the face of forestry protests in 2008".

As a piece of performance art, the protest has been held up as an early example of the participatory culture of social media.

Beltran has continued to use the image of the angel to try to influence politicians in the Parliament to pay more attention to environmental issues.

In 2007, Beltran was sued for police wage costs of $2870, and $6198 in lost revenue for the state timber agency. Police and foresters ultimately failed in their suit, and no damages were awarded. Green politicians supported Beltran, citing that the police and forestry action was "interfering in the political process" in which protests are a "legitimate form of activity in a free country."
