= Ash Keating =

Australian visual artist (born 1980)

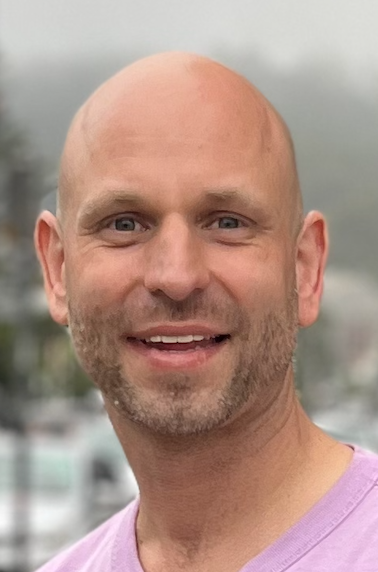
- Ash Keating in 2023
- Born: Ashley James Keating; 4 October 1980 (age 46)
- Education: Victorian College of the Arts, Monash University
- Known for: Painting
- Website: ashkeating.com

Ash Keating (born 1980) is an Australian contemporary visual artist.

Keating works within an expanded contemporary field, through painting, performance, sculpture, video and intervention. His large outdoor murals, created with paint-filled fire extinguishers, can be found across Melbourne.

His practice is multidisciplinary, ranging from site-specific installations, outdoor murals and performances, to large-scale and domestic-scale canvases.

Since 2004, he has exhibited extensively in galleries and undertaken large scale, site-responsive public art projects across Australia and internationally.

== Biography ==
Ash Keating was born in Melbourne, Australia in 1980. He studied Bachelor of Fine Arts (Painting) at Monash University in 2004, followed by a Bachelors of Fine Arts, First Class Honours (Painting) at Victorian College of the Arts in 2006.

== Collections ==
Keating's works are held in numerous public and private collections including:

- National Gallery of Victoria, Melbourne
- National Gallery of Australia, Canberra
- Museum of Contemporary Art Australia, Sydney
- Art Gallery of New South Wales, Sydney
- Monash University Museum of Art, Melbourne
- Artbank, Melbourne
- Shepparton Art Museum, Melbourne

== Selected exhibitions and projects ==
=== Selected solo exhibitions and projects ===
- 2023 Pressure, Bunjil Place Gallery, Narre Warren VIC
- 2023 Ice Floes Response, At The Above, Fitzroy, VIC
- 2023 Gravity System Response, Museum Langmatt, Baden, Switzerland
- 2023 Perceptual Fields, Colector Gallery, Monterrey, Mexico
- 2023 ELEVATION, Shepparton Art Museum, Shepparton, VIC
- 2022 Gravity System Response, A.M. BJIERE, New York, New York, USA
- 2021 Duality, Linden New Art, St Kilda, VIC
- 2021 Gravity System Response, TW Fine Art, Brisbane QLD
- 2019 Hume Response Paintings, Ash Keating Studio, Coburg North, VIC
- 2018 Gravity System Response #81, commission for 2 Southbank Boulevard, Melbourne, VIC
- 2018 Gravity System Response, Fox Jensen McCrory, Auckland, New Zealand
- 2017 Gravity System Response, Blackartprojects, Melbourne, VIC
- 2016 Response Paintings, Latrobe VAC, Bendigo, VIC

=== Selected group exhibitions and projects ===
- 2021 Floating Land Biennale, Noosa National Park for Noosa Regional Gallery, Noosa, QLD
- 2018 ART21 and VOLTA Art Fairs with Yavuz Gallery, Basel, Switzerland and Shanghai, China
- 2018 Sydney Contemporary (2018 and 2017) with Blackartprojects, Sydney, NSW
- 2017 Ramsay Art Prize 2017, Art Gallery of South Australia, Adelaide, SA
- 2016 Occupied, RMIT Design Hub, Melbourne, VIC
- 2013 Melbourne Now, National Gallery of Victoria, Melbourne, VIC
- 2012 Artist's Proof #1, Monash University Museum of Art, Caulfield, VIC

=== Selected site specific solo art projects ===
- 2023 Painting of Haus Germann, Museum Langmatt, Baden, Switzerland
- 2022 Gravity System Response Wall Painting for NAP Contemporary Mildura, VIC
- 2022 Gravity System Response, (for Kaleidoscope) Arts Centre Melbourne, VIC
- 2021 Sunset Response, wall painting on the facade of Warrnambool Art Gallery, VIC
- 2019 TarraWarra Response Painting, TarraWarra Museum of Art, Healesville, VIC
- 2018 Gravity System Response, City of Sydney's Domain, Sydney, NSW
- 2016 Coastal Horizon Response, Lorne Sculpture Biennale, VIC
- 2016 Arch Tunnel Response, North Byron Parklands, Splendour Arts, NSW
- 2015 The Facade Project, Latrobe Visual Arts Centre, Bendigo, VIC
- 2015 Adelaide Festival Centre, presented by CACSA, Adelaide, SA
- 2014 RMIT A’Beckett Urban Square, Melbourne, VIC
- 2013 National Gallery of Victoria International Billboard for Melbourne Now, Melbourne, VIC

== Awards ==
=== Winner ===
- 2015 Incinerator Art Prize
- 2013 Guirguis New Art Prize
- 2012 Substation Contemporary Art Prize
- 2011 Qantas Visual Arts Award
- 2008 ANZ Art and Australia RIPE award.

=== Finalist ===
- 2017 Ramsay Art Prize at the Art Gallery of South Australia
- 2011 Blake Prize
- 2011 Substation Contemporary Art Award
- 2009 Qantas SOYA awards
- 2009 RBS Australian emerging artist awards

== Publications ==
- Ash Keating: Museum Langmatt. Hatje Cantz Verlag, 2023. Edited by Markus Stegmann. ISBN 9783775755160.
- Spirits in the Bush – The Art of Gippsland. Australian Scholarly Publishing, 2019. By Simon Gregg. ISBN 9781925801699.
- Art + Climate = Change. Melbourne University Publishing, 2016. By Guy Abrahams, Kelly Gellatly, and Bronwyn Johnson. ISBN 9780522869576.
- Performance Ritual Document. Macmillan Art Publishing, 2014. By Anne Marsh. ISBN 9781921394973.
- Curating Sydney: Imagining the City's Future. NewSouth Publishing, 2014. By Jill Bennett and Saskia Beudel. ISBN 9781742247106.
- Video Void – Australian Video Art. Australian Scholarly Pub, 2014. Edited by Matthew Perkins. ISBN 9781925003796.
- Artists' Proof #1. Monash University Museum of Art I MUMA, 2012. By Geraldine Barlow, Max Delany, Shelley McSpedden, Francis Parker, Patrice Sharkey. ISBN 9780987295231.
- Making the University Matter. Taylor & Francis, 2012. Edited by Barbie Zelizer. ISBN 9781136696930.
- Time shrines: mourning and melancholia in the work of Ash Keating. Discipline Journal, 2012. By Amelia Barikin. ISSN 1839-082X.
- The Art of Engagement: Culture, collaboration, innovation. University of Western Australia, 2011. By Elaine Lally, Ien Ang, and Kay Anderson. ISBN 9781742582870.
- Junk - Art and the Politics of Trash. Bloomsbury Publishing, 2010. BY Gillian Whiteley. ISBN 9780857720214.
- Space Invaders - Australian Street Stencils, Posters, Paste-ups, Zines, Stickers. National Gallery of Australia, 2010. By Jaklyn Babington and Roger Butler. ISBN 9780642334114.
- Harmonic Tremors - Aesthetic Interventions in the Public Sphere. Gasworks Arts Park, 2009. Edited by Sarah Rainbird. ISBN 9780646503356.
