= Thomas Friedensen =

Australian artist

Thomas Friedensen (1879–1931) was an English-born artist, active in Australia.

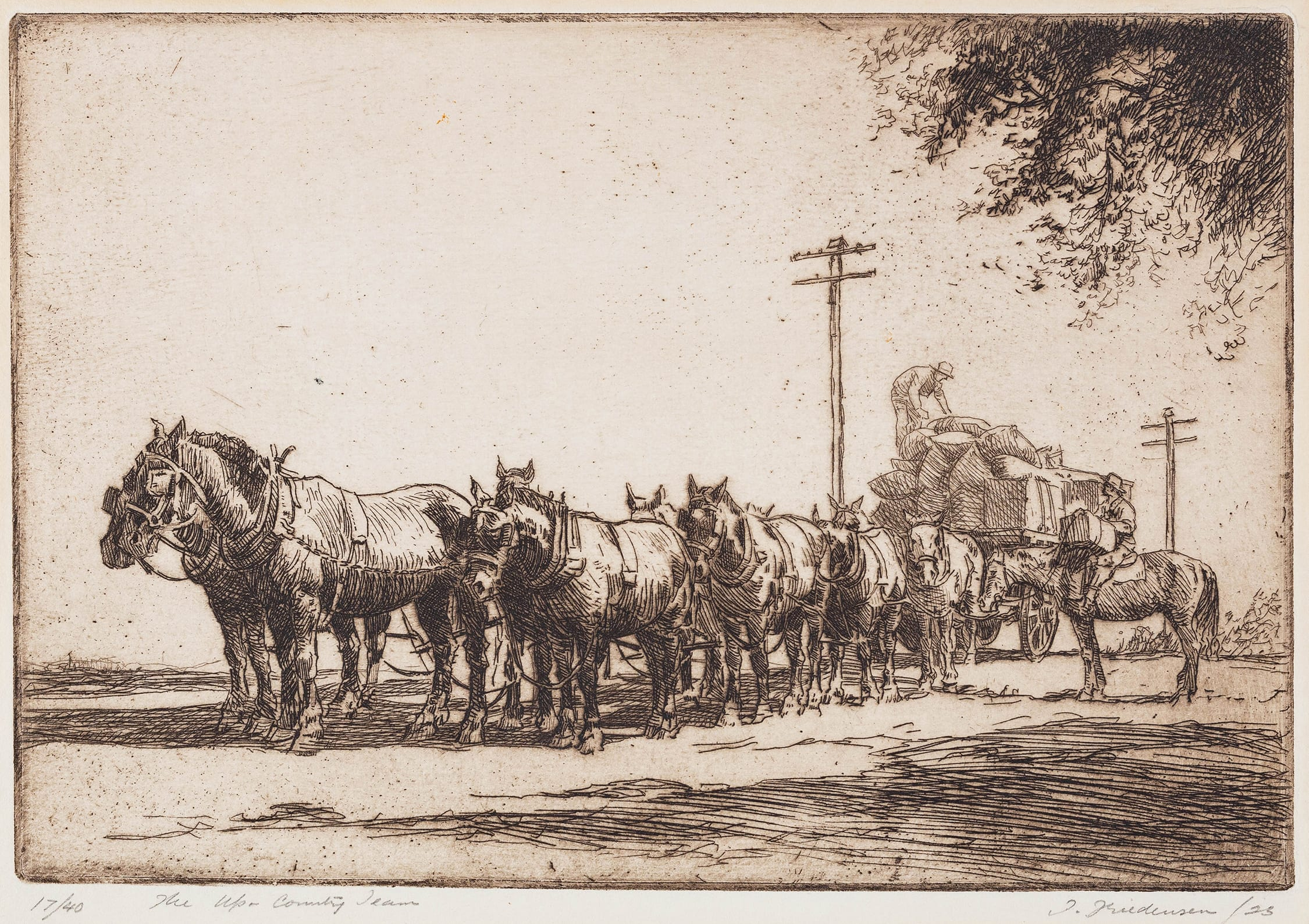
The Up Country Team (1923 etching)
