= David Booker =

Australian sculptor (born 1954)

David Booker (born 1954) is an Australian sculptor.

== Biography ==
David Booker was born in Australia in 1954. He was educated in Sydney, Australia and Hobart, Tasmania. His first solo exhibition was in 1983, in the main foyer, central Railway Station, Sydney. Since then, he has continued to show his sculptures in collective and solo exhibitions in Italian towns of art and since 1989 he lives and works in his house-workshop in Umbria, Italy.

== Artistic career ==
David Booker's works consist of monumental sculptures and original pencil drawings. His first solo exhibition was in 1983, in the main foyer, Central railway station, Sydney. Since then, he has continued to show his sculptures in collective and solo exhibitions, focusing on the integration of his themes in special architectural urban settings in Italian cities of art and in contemporary buildings.

He also has been exhibiting pencil drawings from that time. The still-life pencil drawings on paper are drawings of boxes and used packaging he collects from recycled rubbish. These found objects are grouped together in different positions before they are drawn.

David Booker's drawings are a real celebration of the recovered element. Cartons, boxes and mechanical parts were chosen and taken from the recycling containers to be drawn in large compositions in pencil, graphite and pastels. David Booker uses light and shadow to reveal the beauty of these materials, unexpected because completely ignored in everyday life. In an absolutely original way, these wastes are recycled once again, and this time forever: removed from their context of use and portrayed from life, those who were humble objects and discarded materials appear in their uniqueness, protagonists with their own personality.
