= Margery Edwards =

Australian artist (1933–1989)

Margery Edwards (1933–1989) was an Australian Abstract Expressionist artist working in mixed media.

== Biography ==
Edwards was born in Newcastle, New South Wales in 1933, she studied in Sydney, the Brera Academy of Art in Milan, and at the Morley College Art School in London, before moving to New York in 1974. In New York, Edwards arrived at her signature style of abstract painting and collage, influenced by Abstract Expressionism, the dominant movement in American painting in the late 1940s and 1950s. At the core of Abstract Expressionism was a belief in the spontaneous freedom of the individual artist and the expression of the inner world of the artist's psychology and spirituality. Such art referred only distantly or obliquely, if at all, to the outside world.

As a style, Abstract Expressionism also ranged over two very different sensibilities, both reflected in Edwards' work. One was characterized by energetic brushwork and rhythmic, dynamic compositions, as seen in the works of Jackson Pollock, Robert Motherwell and Antoni Tàpies. The other was more contemplative in mood and made up of subtle colour harmonies, often sombre, with relatively static compositions and simple forms, exemplified by the paintings of Mark Rothko and Ad Reinhardt.

Edwards preferred people to interpret her art in their own way, which is why she titled her work with the initials 'NY' (for work done in New York) and with a number, rather than a more descriptive title. She first exhibited a series of black paintings in New York in 1978. In hand written notes on her work in 1983, Edwards explained that, for her, black "is essential for directing the viewer...into a spiritual dimension, acknowledging the hidden mysterious nature of the eternal". Edwards noted that a black surface attuned the viewer to strive to glimpse subtleties of forms, some of which gave an illusion of depth (with some planes receding and others approaching the viewer), an illusion which could be related psychologically to the experience of varying levels of human consciousness: "If the painter achieves sufficient depth in the process of painting an experience of passing through an open door into a feeling of oneness or unity or complete freedom is attained".

Then, in Edwards' work of the early 1980s, strong verticals and horizontals appeared across textured canvases. The physical presence of these dynamic works is compelling in itself, but there are also forms reminiscent of both natural and urban environments:linear elements may refer to tree trunks, horizons, rocks, rivers, cliffs, shorelines. And it has been noted that the gritty, rusted-industrial or bituminous looking surfaces of the paintings echo Edward's experiences of twice renovating filthy, former commercial loft spaces in the SoHo and TriBeCa areas of New York.

In 1985, Edwards' black paint began to merge into deep colours: ochres, earthy reds and deep blues. These paintings, writes curator Jeanne Wilkinson, "portrayed darkness as a universal constant; not empty but filled with some mysterious presence; an origin, not a lack of light".

Works on paper were also important in Edwards' art. She was constantly creating collages, prints and visual diaries, which are a record of ideas, an echo of experiences and environments as in the paintings, and sometimes a lighter and humorous foil to the darker, more intense paintings.

When she died in 1989, Edwards had created a series of images that trace a journey both earthbound and spiritual; in her own words: "a progression through darkness and light". (Sue Smith – Curator Rockhampton Art Gallery 2007)

Works by Edwards are held by the Art Gallery of New South Wales, the National Gallery of Australia, the Newcastle Art Gallery, the National Gallery of Canada, the Metropolitan Museum of Art, and the Minneapolis Institute of Arts.
