= Amber Hammad =

Pakistani-Australian creative, artist and researcher

Amber Hammad (born 1981) is a Pakistani-Australian creative, artist and researcher who has exhibited her artworks at a number of national and international galleries and museums. Her artistic style is multi-disciplinary but she is most well known for grandeur self portraiture in which she challenges and reimagines visibility, invisibility and misrepresentation and questions Islamophobia.

She is currently working towards her PhD at the University of Sydney where she is working on a thesis: Neo Sufi-Feminism: Illuminating the Veil and the Feminine in South Asian Sacred Sufi Vernacular which she is doing through self portraiture.
