= George Cross Thomas Orr =

Australian watercolour artist (1882–1933)

George Cross Thomas Orr (1882 – 1933) was an Australian watercolour artist. He commonly signed his paintings "G. C. T. Orr".

== Biography ==
Orr was born in the Sydney suburb of Waterloo in 1882. He was the first child of shoemaker Thomas William Orr and his wife Maria (née Turner). He married Annie Victoria Plunkett in Petersham in 1906.

Orr produced watercolour landscapes of Sydney and was known to have been actively painting as early as 1918.

He died in Lindfield on 3 July 1933. The New South Wales Coroner's inquest in Sydney on 7 July 1933 found that his death was caused by a wilfully self-inflicted bullet wound to the head. He was subsequently buried at the Macquarie Park Cemetery in North Ryde and was survived by his daughter Aida and son George.

== Gallery ==
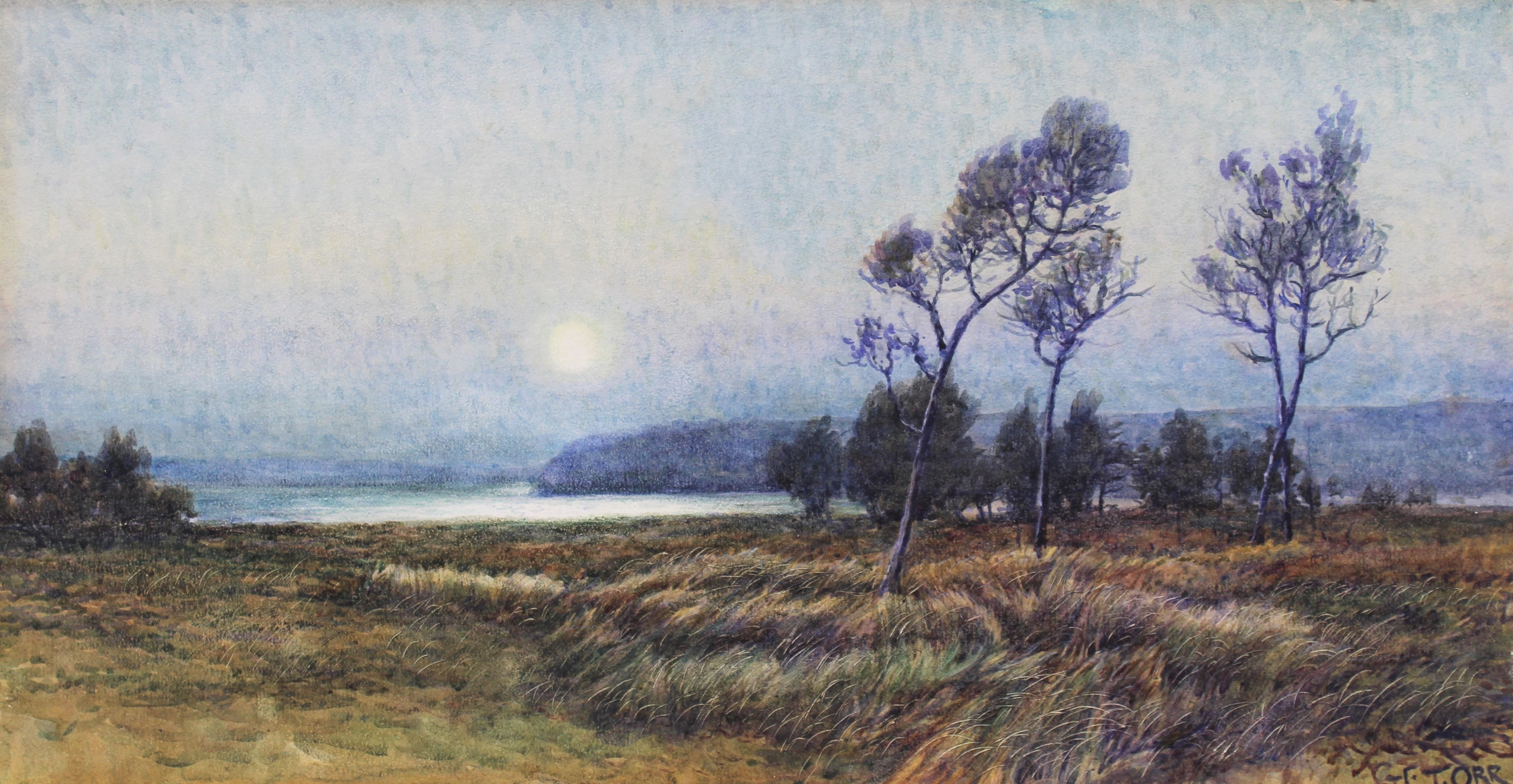
Moonrise, Pittwater
