= Jörg Schmeisser =

Printmaker (1942–2012)

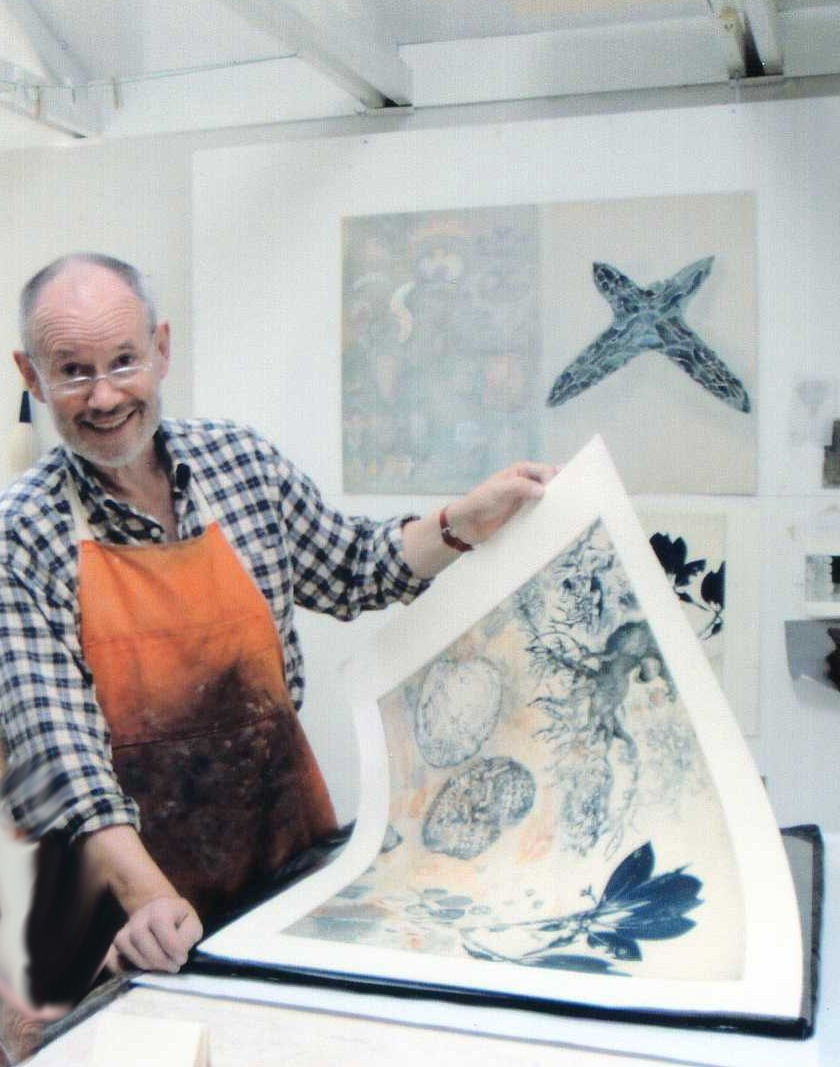
- Jörg Schmeisser in 2010
- Born: 20 April 1942; Stolp, Gau Pomerania, German Reich
- Died: 1 June 2012 (aged 70); Canberra, Australia
- Education: Hochschule für bildende Künste Hamburg, Hamburg, Germany (1962–67) under Paul Wunderlich and Kyoto City Fine Art University Japan 1967-68
- Known for: Printmaker, Painter

Jörg Schmeisser (20 February 1942 – 1 June 2012) was a noted and award-winning printmaker.

== Biography ==
Schmeisser was born in Stolp, Pomerania, Germany (modern Słupsk, Poland); he studied at the Hamburg Fine Art Academy, Germany during 1962–67 and also in Kyoto (Kyoto Fine Art Academy) during 1969-72. During his studies in Hamburg he studied printmaking under Paul Wunderlich. In the 1960s and 1970s, he was also involved in archeological excavations in Israel and Greece as a draughtsman/artist. In the years 1978–97 he worked at the Canberra School of Art, appointed Founding Head of the Department of Printmaking. Schmeisser travelled extensively through Europe, Asia and Australia. He was married to the artist Keiko Amenomori Schmeisser. He died in 2012 in Canberra, Australia

== Awards ==
- Fremantle Print Award: 1980 (joint award with Rod Ewins)

== Bibliography ==
- Wanajo, Eri, ed. (2018). Jörg Schmeisser Retrospective: Neverending Journeys. Kyuryodo Art Publishing Co. ISBN 978-4763018267.
- Gates, Meryn; Butler, Roger; Schmeisser, Jörg (2013). Jörg Schmeisser : bilder der reise [Jörg Schmeisser: travel pictures]. MacMillan Art Publishing. ISBN 978-1921394942.
- Andrews, Lynne; Schmeisser, Jörg (2003). Hansen, David (ed.). Jörg Schmeisser : Breaking the ice : works from the Antarctic 1998-2003. Tasmanian Museum and Art Gallery. ISBN 0975054503.
- Kolenberg, Hendrik; Ryan, Anne. Australian Prints from the Gallery's Collection. Art Gallery of New South Wales. ISBN 0731389123.
- Grishin, Sasha (1997). Australian Printmaking in the 1990s. Craftsman House. ISBN 9781875247158.
- Grishin, Sasha (2000). Australian Identities in Printmaking : The Australian Print Collection of Wagga Wagga Regional Art Gallery. Wagga Wagga Regional Art Gallery. ISBN 9057033917.
