= Gillian Mann =

Australian artist (1939–2007)

- Born: 11 May 1939; Derby, England
- Died: 29 December 2007 (aged 68); Canberra, Australia
- Known for: Printmaking
- Spouse(s): Kashmirilal Mohanlal Shah, Alistair Geoffrey Hay

Gillian Mann (11 May 1939 – 29 December 2007), English/Australian artist who won the Blake Prize for Religious Art with the woodcut print on paper titled The Chest in 1990. She was born in Derby, England and moved to Canberra, Australia in 1971 and retired to the small town of Binalong, New South Wales in the 1990s.

She was a printmaking lecturer at the Canberra School of Art. She specialised in printmaking techniques and changed to digital art in the late 1990s. Other bodies of work included glass sculptures.

Mann had a son, Julian. She died in 2007 from pancreatic cancer.

== Art ==
The art of Gillian Mann is primarily concerned with the different visual languages used throughout Western history. Her use of iconography and mediums is informed by an awareness of the meanings they hold within art history and the 'collective memory' of the West. Her practice has been imbued with a social conscience, moulded by a childhood in post-war England, and the social activism of the 1960s. Feminism in the 1970s informed her deconstruction of gender and power in the West and has shaped her practice ever since. Immigrating to Australia in 1971 gave her a perspective on the culture she knew, allowing her to perceive other possibilities.
