= List of people from Brisbane =

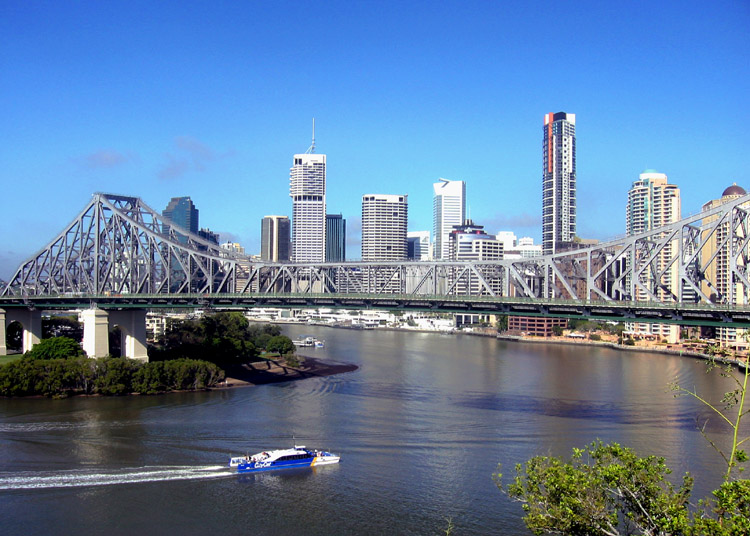
Brisbane and the Story Bridge

This listing includes notable people who were born in Brisbane, Queensland, Australia — as well as notable people who are working in Brisbane, or who began their careers in Brisbane (please see the individual articles for references).

People from Brisbane are either referred to as Brisbanites, BrisVegan (BrisVegas) or Brisbanian.

== Artists ==
- Olive Ashworth (1915–2000), textile designer
- Clark Beaumont, video, performance art
- Irene Chou, long-term Brisbane resident
- Jon Molvig

== Aviators ==
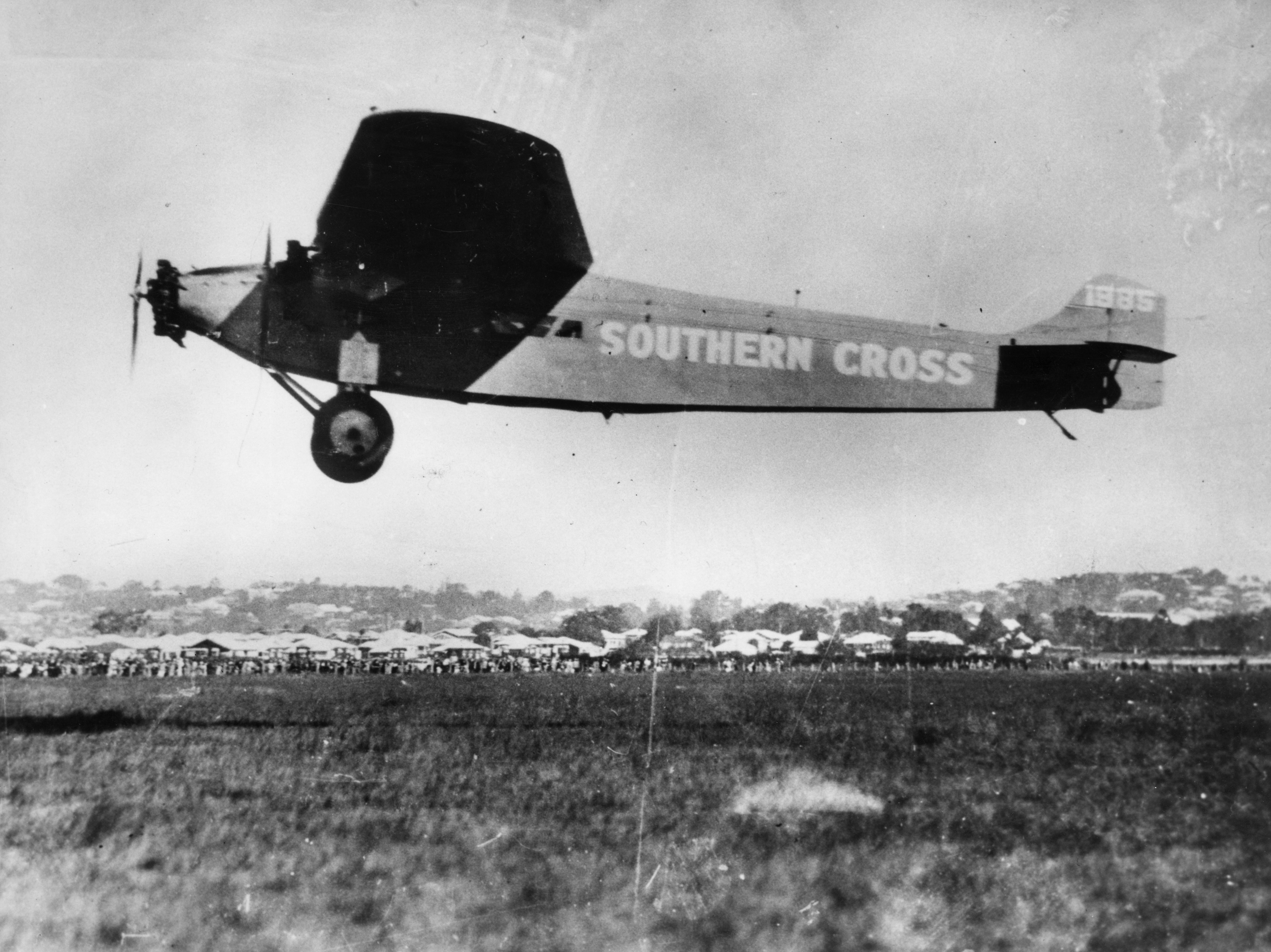
The Southern Cross landing in Brisbane in 1928

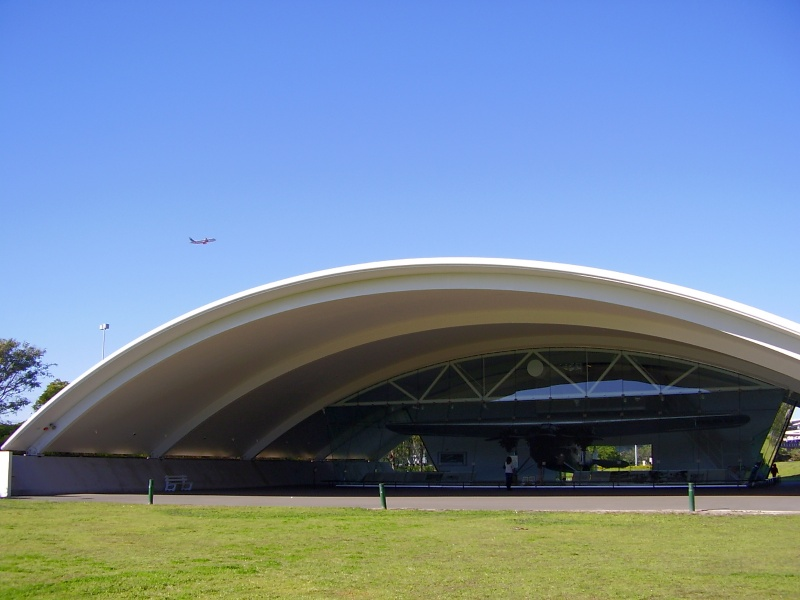
The Kingsford Smith Memorial, housing the Southern Cross

Notable Brisbane-born aviators include:

- Sir Charles Kingsford Smith, pioneer aviator, who, with his crew, made the first flight across the Pacific in his aircraft, the Southern Cross, from San Francisco, California, United States to Brisbane, Queensland, Australia in 1928. The 1928 trans-Pacific flight was the first flight from one side of the ocean to the other.

The aircraft is currently preserved and on display in the Kingsford Smith Memorial, a special a climate-controlled sealed glass building near the International terminal at Brisbane Airport

== Government, politics and law ==
Notable Brisbane-born people in this section include:

- Lord Atkin, judge of the English High Court
- Quentin Bryce AD, former governor-general of Australia
- Bill Hayden, former governor-general of Australia
- Emma Miller, pioneer labour activist and suffragist
- Sir William Webb, High Court of Australia judge and president of the Military Tribunal in the Far East (which tried Japanese war criminals)

== Medical doctors ==
Noteworthy medics from Brisbane include:

- Raphael Cilento, public health physician and eminent medical administrator
- Ian Frazer AC, immunologist and co-inventor of Gardasil
- John Kerr, pathologist and first to describe apoptosis
- Jeannette Young AC, former Chief Health Officer of Queensland and Governor of Queensland

== Researchers ==
Notable Brisbane-born people in research include:

- Peter C. Doherty, medical researcher and Nobel Prize winner

== Sculptors ==
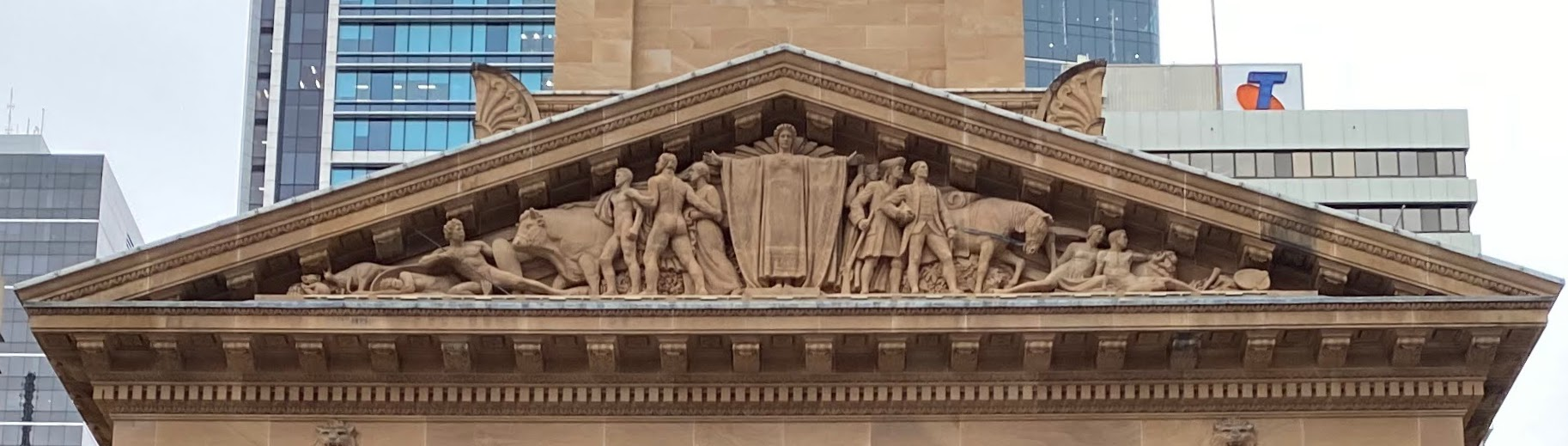
Daphne Mayo's tympanum at the Brisbane City Hall

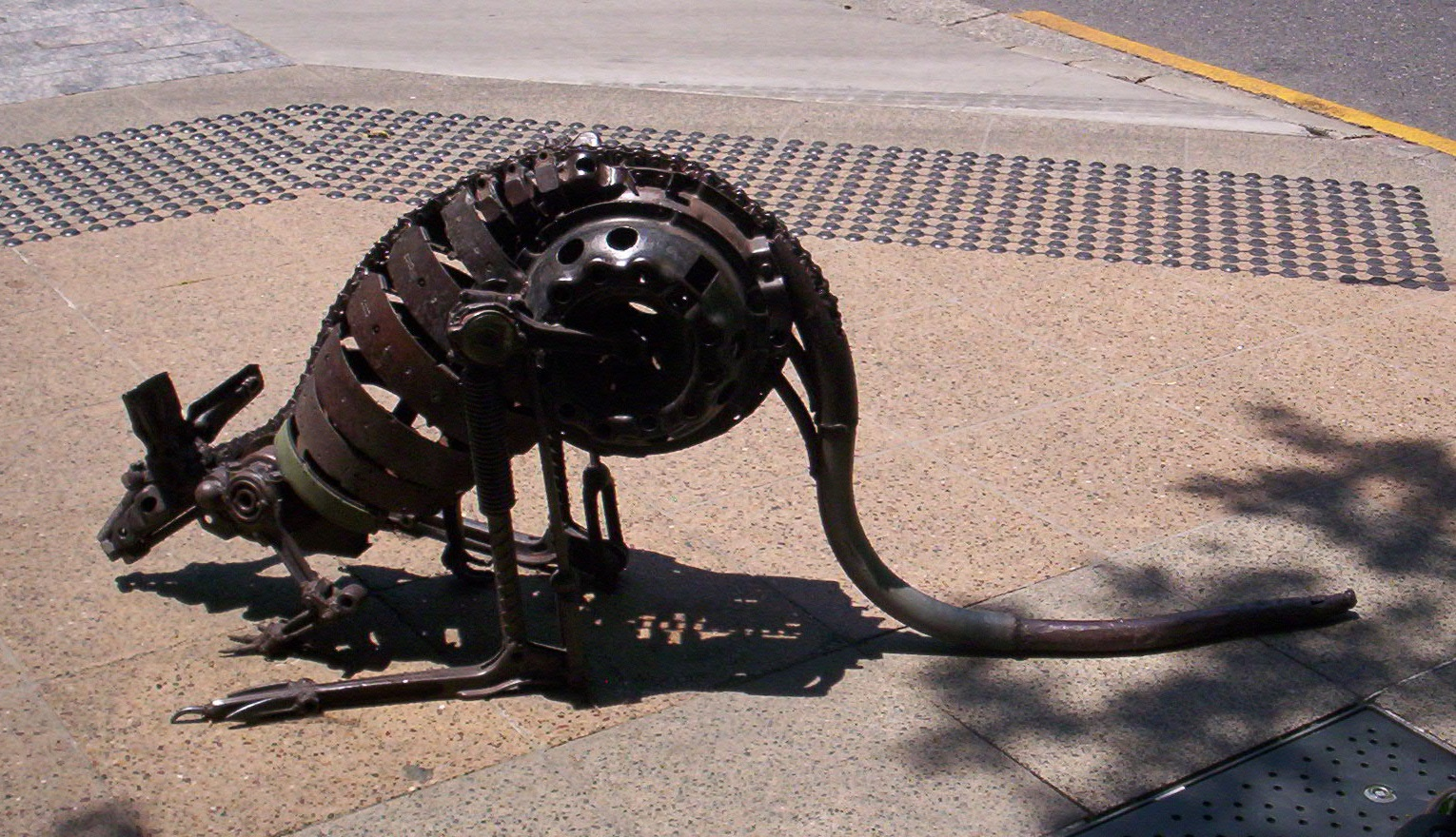
Christopher Trotter's City Roo sculpture

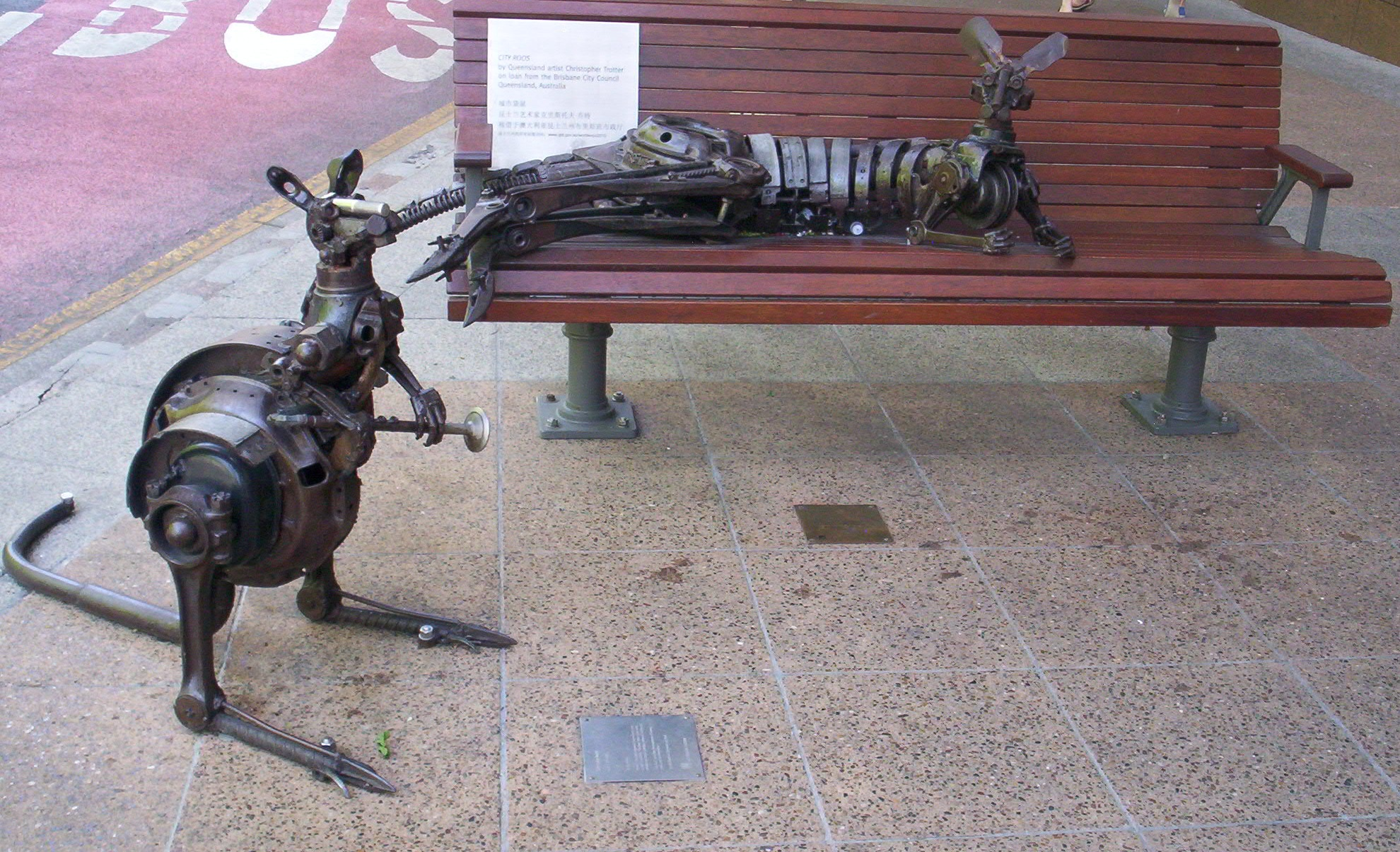
Two more City Roo sculptures

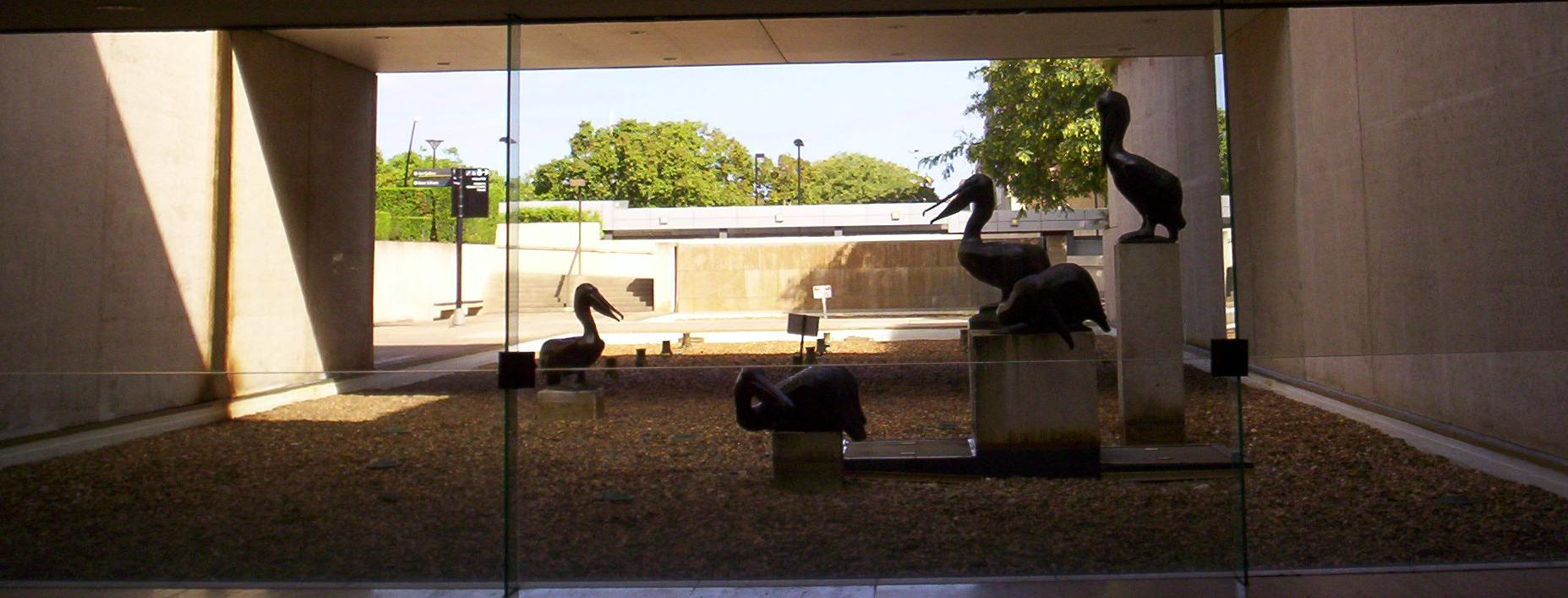
Leonard and Kathleen Shillam's Pelican sculptures at the Queensland Art Gallery

- Daphne Mayo, sculptures include the tympanum above the King George Square entrance to Brisbane City Hall, sculptures at the Queensland Art Gallery
- Leonard and Kathleen Shillam, sculptures include the Pelican sculptures at the Queensland Art Gallery
- Christopher Trotter, sculptures include the Brisbane City Roos, kangaroo sculptures in George Street, Brisbane

== Singers, dancers, musicians and composers ==
=== Notable Brisbane-born people ===
- Courtney Act, singer and drag performer
- Jason Barry-Smith, opera singer
- Jeffrey Black, opera singer
- Judi Connelli, singer and actress
- Diana Doherty, classical musician
- Gina G, singer
- Lisa Gasteen, opera singer and winner of Cardiff Singer of the World competition in 1991
- Darren Hayes, lead Vocalist of Savage Garden 1993–2001 (currently solo artist)
- Kate Miller-Heidke, classically trained opera singer
- Mirusia, soprano, lead vocalist with André Rieu, winner of the Dame Joan Sutherland Opera Award 2006
- Pete Murray, singer
- Patricia Petersen, singer, pianist and actress
- S3RL, DJ, record producer
- Conrad Sewell, singer
- Amber Scott, ballet dancer
- Donald Shanks, opera singer
- Bart Stenhouse, jazz fusion musician
- Patrick Thomas, conductor, poet, author
- Garth Welch, principal dancer
- John Willsteed, musician and sound designer
- Christopher Wrench, organist
- Bowen Yang, comedian, actor
- Jake Sim, k-pop idol, ENHYPEN

=== Notable residents ===
- Li Cunxin, ballet dancer, subject of Mao's Last Dancer
- Robert Davidson, composer
- Edward Guglielmino, composer, researcher
- Gordon Hamilton, composer
- Dami Im, singer
- Luke Kennedy, singer
- Stephen Leek, composer
- Liza Lim, composer
- Mungo McKay, actor
- Alexander Voltz, composer
- Brandon Woods, violinist

=== Music groups with Brisbane origins ===
- Ball Park Music, music group
- Bee Gees, music group
- Butterfingers, music group
- The Butterfly Effect, music group
- Caligula's Horse, music group
- Cub Sport, music group
- Dune Rats, music group
- DZ Deathrays, music group
- The Go-Betweens, music group
- The Goon Sax, music group
- The Grates, music group
- Hatchie, dream pop band
- Indecent Obsession, music group
- The Jungle Giants, music group
- Last Dinosaurs, music group
- Odd Mob, music group, EDM duo
- Powderfinger, music group
- Regurgitator, music group
- The Riptides, music group
- The Saints, music group
- Savage Garden, music group
- The Screaming Tribesmen, music group
- Brad Shepherd, musician, Hoodoo Gurus
- Sheppard, music group
- Billo Smith, musician and Cloudland band leader
- TwoSet Violin, classical musicians and internet musical comedy duo, composed of violinists Eddy Chen and Brett Yang
- The Veronicas, music group, twin duo
- Violent Soho, music group

=== Solo singers with Brisbane origins ===
- Keith Urban, lived in Caboolture, Moreton Bay, North Brisbane until he was 25 years old (1992)

== Sports teams ==
Brisbane is home to multiple sports teams such as the Brisbane Broncos, who currently play in the NRL.

- Rugby league teams: Brisbane Broncos, Brisbane Tigers
- Football teams: Brisbane Roar, Brisbane Strikers, Queensland Lions
- AFL teams: Brisbane Lions
- Rugby union teams: Queensland Reds, Queensland Country
- Cricket teams: Brisbane Heat, Brisbane Lions
- Other sports: Brisbane Bullets (basketball), Brisbane Bandits (baseball), Queensland Firebirds (netball)

== Athletics ==
Brisbane is also the home of:

- Kyra Cooney-Cross, soccer player for Australia
- Scott Dixon, Brisbane-born New Zealander, Indycar driver
- Roy Emerson, one of the most successful tennis players in history
- Erika Geisen, German-born, IFBB professional bodybuilder
- Katrina Gorry, soccer player for Australia
- Priscilla Hon, tennis player
- Jeff Horn, lightweight world champion boxer
- Darren Lockyer, rugby league footballer
- Mollie O'Callaghan, swimmer
- Pat Orreal, darts player
- Clare Polkinghorne, soccer player for Australia
- Hayley Raso, soccer player for Australia
- Cameron Smith, professional golfer
- Samantha Stosur, Grand Slam champion
- Laura Taylor, swimmer
- Johnathan Thurston, rugby league footballer
- Libby Trickett, swimmer
- David Tyrrell, Brisbane-born NRL premiership player (South Sydney Rabbitohs)
- Jessica Weintraub (born 2007), Australian Olympic rhythmic gymnast

== Stage and screen ==
Brisbane-born actors, actresses, producers, playwrights and comedians include:

- Daniel Amalm, actor
- Jacinda Barrett, actress
- Ray Barrett, actor
- Diane Cilento, actress
- Barry Creyton, actor
- Jacob Elordi, actor
- Janet Fielding, actress
- Gyton Grantley, actor
- Anthony Hayes, actor
- Claire Holt, actress
- Craig Horner, actor
- Joe Klocek, actor
- Ben Lawson, actor
- Josh Lawson, actor
- Lincoln Lewis, actor
- George Miller, director
- Levi Miller, actor
- Matt Okine, comedian, actor, musician
- Barry Otto, actor
- Miranda Otto, actress
- Matt Passmore, actor
- Patricia Petersen, actress, playwright, director, producer
- Megan Smart, actress
- John Stanton, actor
- Alyssa Sutherland, actress and model
- Leonard Teale, actor
- Josh Thomas, comedian
- Rowena Wallace, actress

Actors, actresses and playwrights who began their careers in Brisbane, or live in Brisbane, include:

- Bille Brown, actor, studio named after him at the home of the Queensland Theatre Company
- Carol Burns, actress
- Penny Downie
- Judith McGrath
- Scott McNeil, voice actor
- Geoffrey Rush, actor
- Sigrid Thornton, actress

== Writers and journalists ==
Writers and journalists who live in Brisbane include:

- Venero Armanno
- Thea Astley
- Trent Dalton, novelist and journalist
- Leigh Diffey
- Chris Dore
- Melissa Downes
- Nick Earls
- Benjamin Law
- Michelle Law
- Andrew Lofthouse
- Hugh Lunn
- David Malouf
- Andrew McGahan
- George Negus, journalist, television presenter and radio host
- Oodgeroo Noonuccal
- Judith Wright

== Other ==
- Elise Barney, postmistress
- Dane Beesley, photographer
- Clarence Osborne
- Bree Warren, model

== See also ==
- Arts and culture in Brisbane
- Popular entertainment in Brisbane
