= Graetz =

Graetz or Grätz is a German surname and place name and may refer to:

== People ==
- Gidon Graetz (born 1929), Swiss-Israeli sculptor
  - Bibi Graetz, owner and winemaker of Toscana wine producer Azienda Agricola Testamatta, son of Gidon
- Heinrich Graetz (1817–1891), German Jewish historian
- Herbert Graetz (1893–1985), Australian Olympic rower
- Jean Graetz (1929-2020), American civil rights leader
- Joseph Graetz (1760–1826), German composer, organist, and educator
- Leo Graetz (1856–1941), German physicist, son of Heinrich
- Paul Graetz (1889–1937), German actor
- Robert Graetz (1928–2020), American Lutheran pastor and civil rights leader
- Rudi Graetz (1907–1977), German esperantist
- Windisch-Graetz, princely family of the Holy Roman Empire

== Places ==
- Grätz, the German name of Grodzisk Wielkopolski, Poland
- Grätz, the German name of Hradec nad Moravicí, Czech Republic
- Kreis Grätz, one of several Kreise (counties) in the Prussian Province of Posen
- Windischgrätz, the German name of Slovenj Gradec, Slovenia

== Other ==
- Graetz number, a dimensionless number that characterizes laminar flow in a conduit in fluid dynamics
- Graetz AG, German manufacturer of petrol lamps and radios

== See also ==
- Gratz (disambiguation)
