= Gratz =

Gratz may refer to:

== Places ==
- Gratz, Alberta, locality in Canada
- Gratz, Austria, former name of the city of Graz, Austria
- Gratz, Kentucky, a US city
- Gratz, Pennsylvania, a US borough

== Other uses ==
- Gratz (surname)
- Gratz College, general college of Jewish studies
- Gratz v. Bollinger, a 2003 United States Supreme Court case
- Simon Gratz High School, secondary school located in Philadelphia, Pennsylvania
- University of Gratz, now called the University of Graz, Austria

== See also ==
- Graz (disambiguation)
- Graetz (disambiguation)
