= Heart Full of Soul (disambiguation) =

"Heart Full of Soul" is a 1965 song by the Yardbirds.

Heart Full of Soul may also refer to:

- Heart Full of Soul (album), a 2006 album by Antony Costa
- Heart Full of Soul, a 2008 album by Krishna Das
