= List of public art in Brisbane =

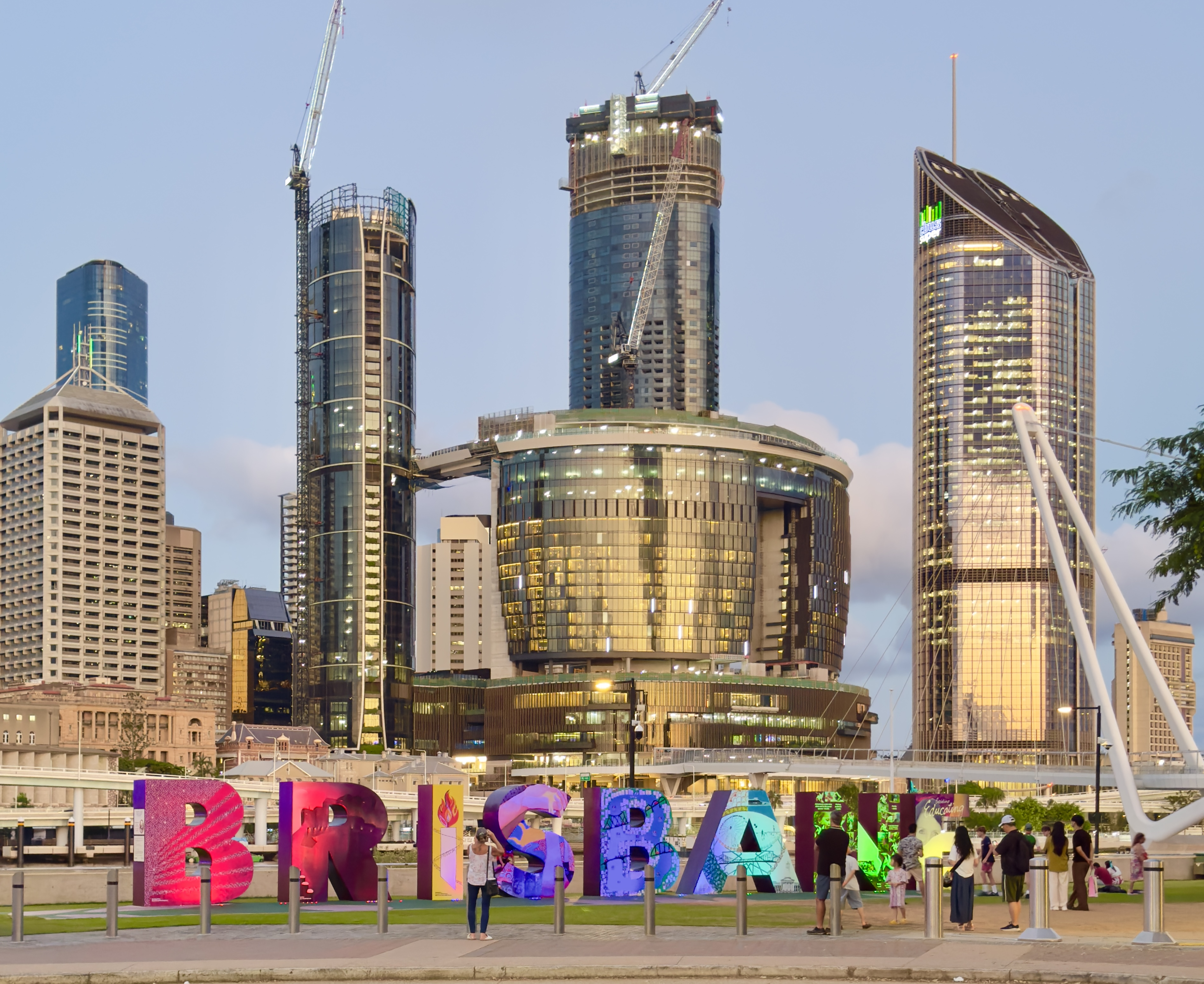
The Brisbane sign in South Bank Cultural Forecourt, 2024

This is a list of public art on permanent public display in Brisbane, Queensland, Australia.

The list applies only to works of public art accessible in an outdoor public space; it does not include artwork on display inside museums. Public art may include sculptures, statues, monuments, memorials, murals and mosaics.

This list does not include military and war memorials.

== List of sculptures ==
Name	Image	Location	Artist	Year	Ref
Lion		King George Square	E.F. Kohler, R. Summerhayes and E.S. Taylor	1938	
The Banker		Post Office Square	Leonard Shillam	1970	
Forme del Mito: Forms of Myth		Edward Street/Turbot Street	Arnaldo Pomodoro	1983	
Pelicans		Queensland Art Gallery, South Bank	Leonard and Kathleen Shillam	1984	
Offshoot		South Bank	Clement Meadmore	1984	
Pelicans		Queensland Art Gallery, South Bank	Leonard and Kathleen Shillam	1984	
Sisters		Queensland Art Gallery, South Bank	Ante Dabro	1985	
Approaching Equilibrium		Queensland Art Gallery, South Bank	Anthony Pryor	1985	
Leviathan Play		South Bank	Ron Robertson-Swann	1985	
Continuous Division		Roma Street Parkland	Greg Johns	1988	
Plant Form		City Botanic Gardens, Gardens Point	Robert Juniper	1988	
Morning Star		City Botanic Gardens, Gardens Point	Jon Barlow Hudson	1988	
Gates of Heaven		King Edward Park	Wendy Mills	1988	
Elephant		South Bank Parklands		1988	
Gestation		Queen Street	Baile Oakes	1988	
The Man & Matter Series		Kangaroo Point Park	Peter D Cole	1992	
Anchorage and Passage		Brisbane International Terminal, Brisbane Airport	Ben Trupperbaumer	1995	
Crossover Guardians		Kangaroo Point Park	Mona Ryder	1995	
Geerbaughs Midden (Section B)		Kangaroo Point Park	Ron Hurley	1995	
Beacon		Esplanade, Shorncliffe	Marion Hoad	1996	
Bowline		Queen Street	Simon Perry	1996	
Net		William Street, Neville Bonner Building	Barbara Heath	1998	
City Roos		George Street	Christopher Trotter	1998/99	
City Roos		George Street	Christopher Trotter	1998/99	
Pride		Charlotte Street/Albert Street	Grant Lehmann	1999	
A tree a rock a cloud		Eagle Street	Barbara Heath	1999	
The Courier		Charlotte Street	John Coleman	1999	
Sundial		Centenary Place		1999	
Emporium		Ann Street		2000s	
Fish		Chinatown, Brisbane		2000s	
Hands		Eagle Street	Sebastian Di Mauro	2003	
Guardian		Kangaroo Point	John Dahlsen	2003	
The Passenger		Queen Street	Cezary Stulgis	2003	
Confluence		George Street	Daniel Templeman	2004	
Drift		Charlotte Street	Sebastian Di Mauro	2004	
Felix		Mary Street, Brisbane	Terry Summers	2004	
Dialogue		Queen Street	Cezary Stulgis	2004	
The Witness Box		South Bank	Daniel Templeman	2004	
Echoes from the North		Edward Street	Augustine Dall'Ava	2004-5	
Steam – 15 geodesic spheres		George Street	Donna Marcus	2006	
Industrial Growth		Boundary Road, Richlands	Christopher Trotter	2007	
Billow		Esplanade, Shorncliffe	Davis Thomas	2007	
Surge		Esplanade, Shorncliffe	Davis Thomas	2007	
The Guardian		Wharf Street	Cezary Stulgis	2008	
Kernel (Falling from Above)		275 George Street	Stuart Green	2009	
Wormholes (Section C)		Kangaroo Point Park	Alexander Knox	2009	
Pod		Northshore Hamilton, Queensland		2010s	
Venus Rising		Kangaroo Point Park, Main Street	Wolfgang Buttress	2011	
Eyes Are Singing Out		415 George Street	Yayoi Kusama	2012	
The World Turns		Queensland Gallery of Modern Art, South Bank	Michael Parekowhai	2012	
Preservation		Kangaroo Point Park	Mel Robson	2013	
Confluenza		Roma Street Parkland	Salvatore Di Mauro and Sebastian Di Mauro	2013	
Gloria		Teneriffe	Mark Andrews	2013	
Feast of the Bon-yi 1		Brisbane Botanic Gardens, Mount Coot-tha	Bianca Beetson	2013	
Feast of the Bon-yi 2		Brisbane Botanic Gardens, Mount Coot-tha	Bianca Beetson	2013	
Poinsettia Riverfire		Emma Miller Place, Brisbane CBD	Luke Roberts	2016	
The Bull		Edward Street			
Big Sister		Eagle Street	John Seward Johnson II		
Mirage		Brisbane Arcade, Queen Street Mall	Gidon Graetz		
Pelicans		on the old bridge foundations in the Brisbane River, Brisbane CBD	Christopher Trotter		
Kangaroo		City Botanic Gardens, Gardens Point			
Garden Sculpture		Brisbane Airport			
Cicada		South Bank			
		Boundary St, Melbourne St and Mollison St intersection West End			
Platypus		Lone Pine Koala Sanctuary, Fig Tree Pocket			
Being Swallowed by the Milky Way		Queen's Wharf, Brisbane	Lindy Lee	2024	

== List of statues ==
Name	Image	Location	Artist	Year
Queen Victoria		Queens Gardens	Thomas Brock	1906
Robert Burns		Centenary Place		1929
George V		King George Square	E.F Kohler, R Summerhayes and E.S.Taylor	1938
Petrie Tableau		King George Square	Stephen Walker (sculptor)	1988
The Drovers		Ann Street	(World Expo 88)	1988 (original)/ 2005 (recast)
Speakers corner		King George Square	Artbusters	1993
Hippocrates		Herston	Phillip Piperides	1996
Child Abuse Memorial		Emma Miller Place	Gavan Fenelon	2004
Konstantin Tsiolkovsky		Sir Thomas Brisbane Planetarium	Sergei Bychkov	2007
Lady Diamantina Bowen		Gardens Point	Phillip Piperides	2009
El Emigrante		Cathedral Square	(World Lebanese Cultural Union)	2010
Confucius		South Bank Parklands	(Ji'nan Municipal Government, Shandong Province, People's Republic of China)	2010
Themis		Courts of Law, George Street		2012
Aurora		Queen Street	Cezary Stulgis	2015
Thomas Joseph Byrnes		Centenary Place		
Thomas Joseph Ryan		Queens Gardens	Edgar Bertram Mackennal	

== List of monuments and memorials ==
Name	Image	Location	Artist	Year
Mooney Memorial Fountain (Firemen Memorial)		Queen Street	William Webster, sculptor	1879
First Free Settlers Monument 1838		Nundah		1938
Tide Recorder		Newstead Park, Newstead		1959
John Oxley Landing Memorial		Newstead Park, Newstead		1983
Resilience		Emma Miller Place	Cida de Aragon and Steffen Lehmann	2007
Q150 time capsule		Gardens Point		2009
Speakers' Corner		George Street		2010
Ken Fletcher Memorial		Tennyson		2013
Sir Charles Kingsford Smith Memorial		Brisbane Airport		
Gateway to Victory		Hamilton		

== See also ==
- List of Australian military memorials
- List of public art in the City of Sydney
- Alphie the Alpha Turtle, a large moveable inflatable floating public artwork
