= Australian Centre for Contemporary Art =

Australian Centre for Contemporary Art (ACCA)
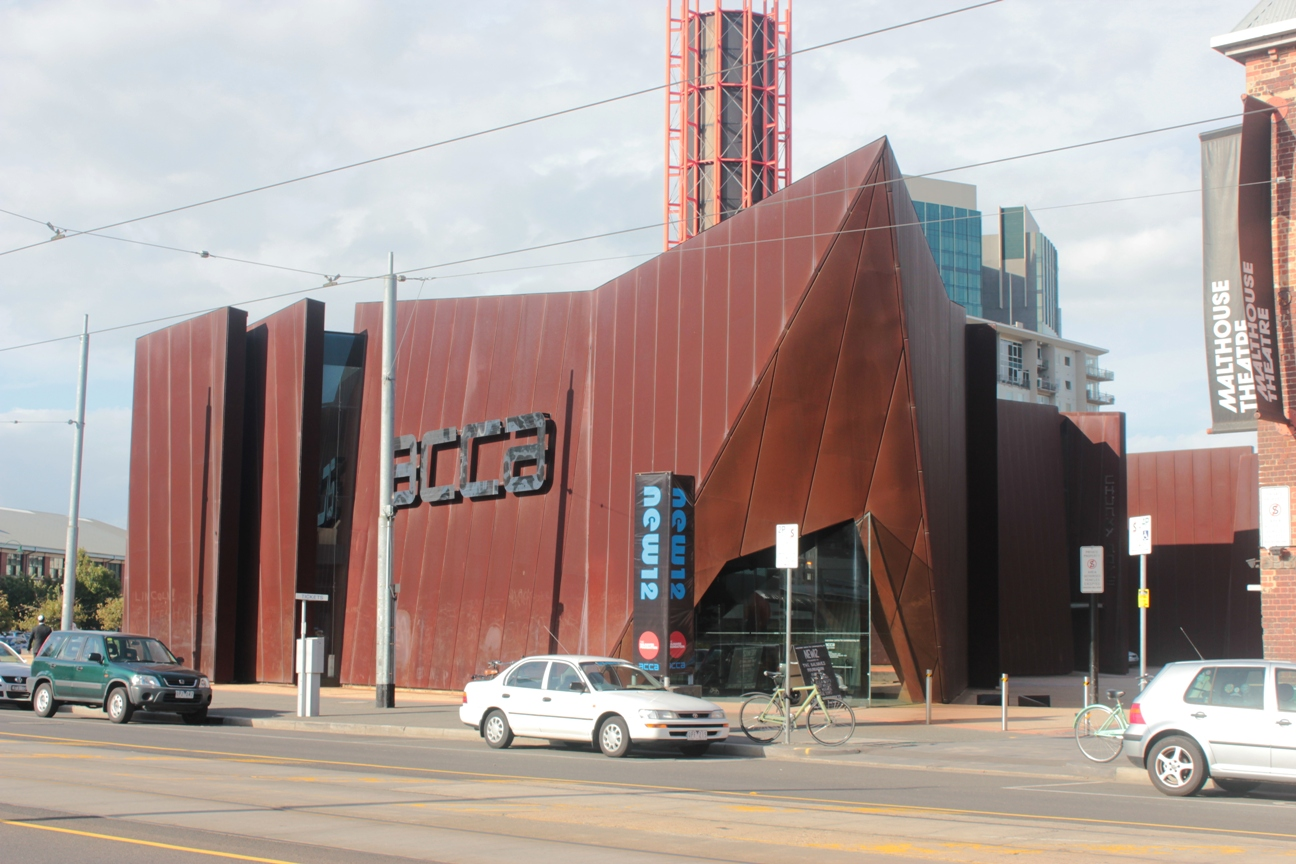
- Established: 1983; 43 years ago
- Location: 111 Sturt Street, Southbank, Victoria, Australia
- Coordinates: 37.826497°S 144.967014°E
- Type: Contemporary art museum
- Artistic director & CEO: Myles Russell-Cook
- Chairperson: Dr Terry Wu
- Website: acca.melbourne

The Australian Centre For Contemporary Art (ACCA) is a contemporary art gallery in Melbourne, Australia. The gallery is located on Sturt Street in the Melbourne Arts Precinct, in the inner suburb of Southbank. Designed by Wood Marsh Architects, the building was completed in 2002, and includes facilities for Chunky Move dance company and the Malthouse Theatre.

Myles Russell-Cook has been Artistic Director and CEO of the centre since 2024.

== History ==
The centre was established in 1983, and moved into its current home in 2002.

In December 2015, Max Delany, formerly senior curator of contemporary art at the National Gallery of Victoria, was announced as the Artistic Director of ACCA, replacing the outgoing artistic director Juliana Engberg. He commenced the role of AD and CEO in February 2016. In November 2024, following Delany's resignation, Myles Russell-Cook was appointed as CEO and Artistic Director. Prior to ACCA, Russell-Cook was Senior Curator of Australian and First Nations Art at the National Gallery of Victoria.

== Architecture ==
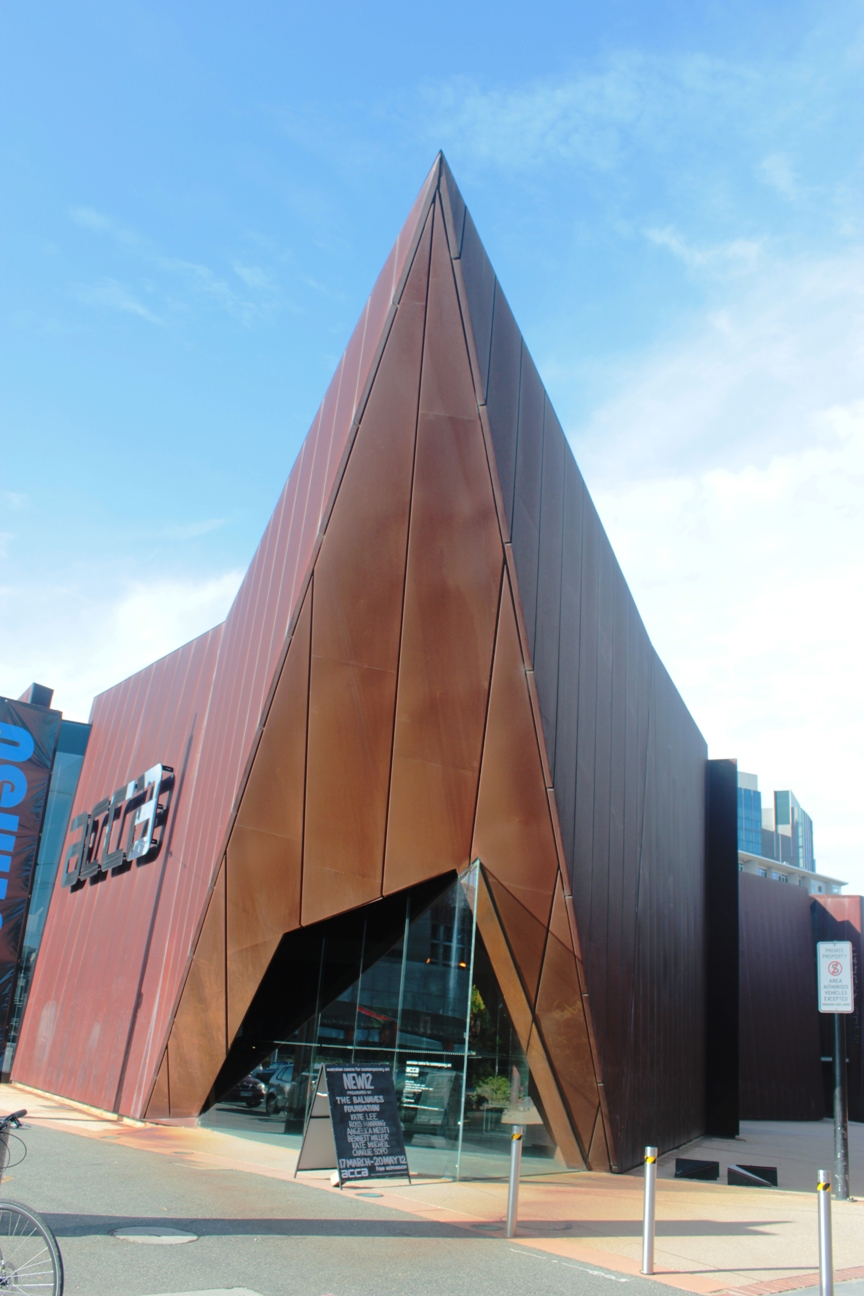
Main entrance

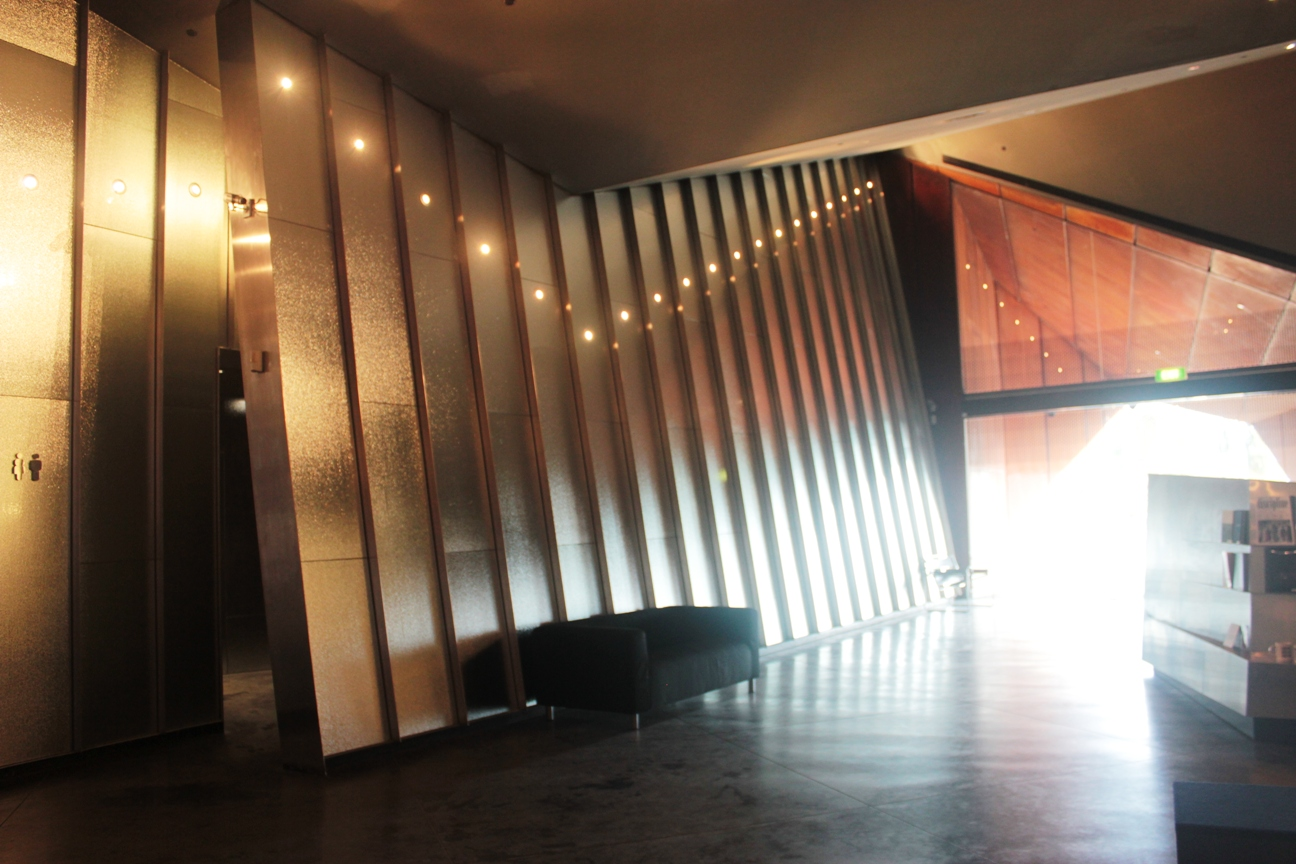
Interior

The ACCA building was designed by Wood Marsh and completed in 2002. It consists of four large gallery spaces, and together with the Malthouse and ACCA form a courtyard at the centre of the complex which is used as an outside performance and exhibition space. The building also includes two rehearsal studios and an administration facilities for dance company Chunky Move as well as a large set construction facility for the Malthouse.

Openings in the distinctive rusty steel façade are kept to a minimum to support a broad array of installations, temporary and digitally projected work, which contrasts with the inter-pressed metal and glass surfaces in the interior. The design references the European model of the Kunsthalle, acting as a flexible shell for the display of art.

The building won the RAIA Institutional Architecture Award in 2003.

=== Sculpture ===
Following the completion of construction, the sculpture Vault, an abstract, minimalist sculpture made of large thick flat polygonal sheets of prefabricated steel by Ron Robertson-Swann, was relocated to the building's forecourt, where it remains today. It is popularly known as The Yellow Peril, due to its colour, modernist shape, cost, and controversy in the newspapers at the time of its placement.

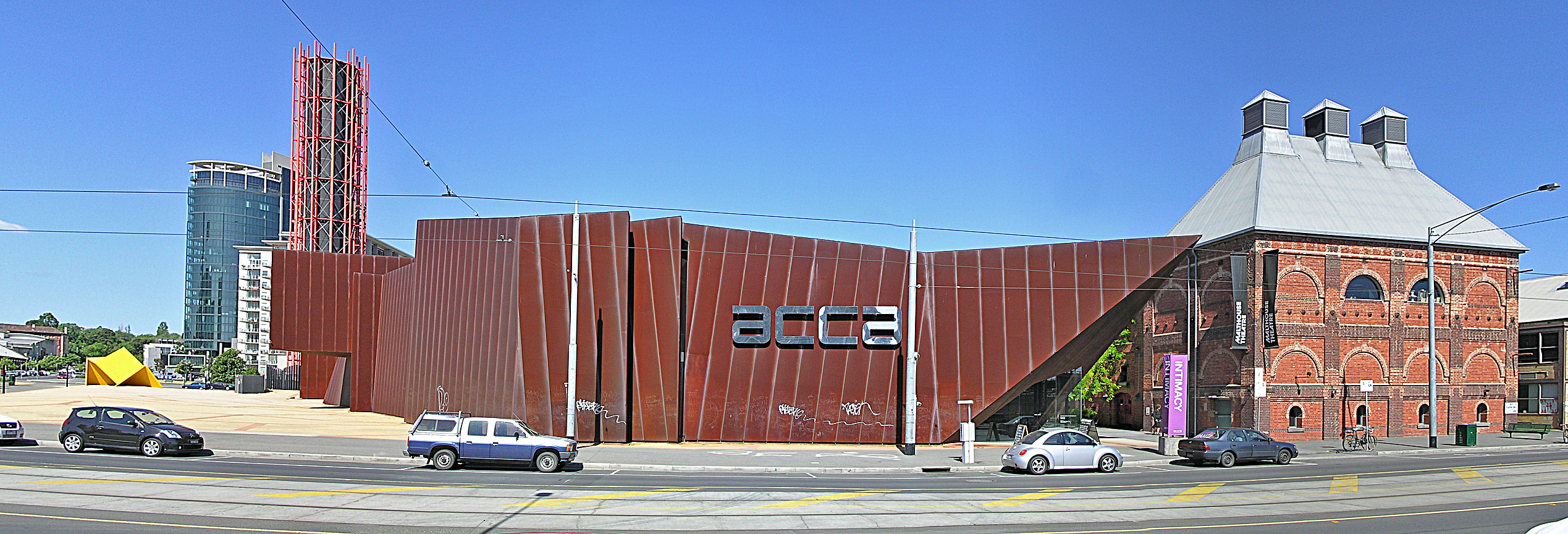
The Australian Centre for Contemporary Art. The Vault sculpture can be seen far left and the Malthouse Theatre is on the right.

== Description and governance ==
ACCA's stated mission is to "Do Art Differently – to challenge, connect and resonate".

Myles Russell-Cook is as of 2024 Artistic Director and CEO of the centre, while Claire Richardson is Executive Director. John Denton, the Victorian Governments first state architect, is chair of the board.

ACCA is a member of the advocacy organisation Contemporary Art Organisations Australia.

== Exhibitions ==
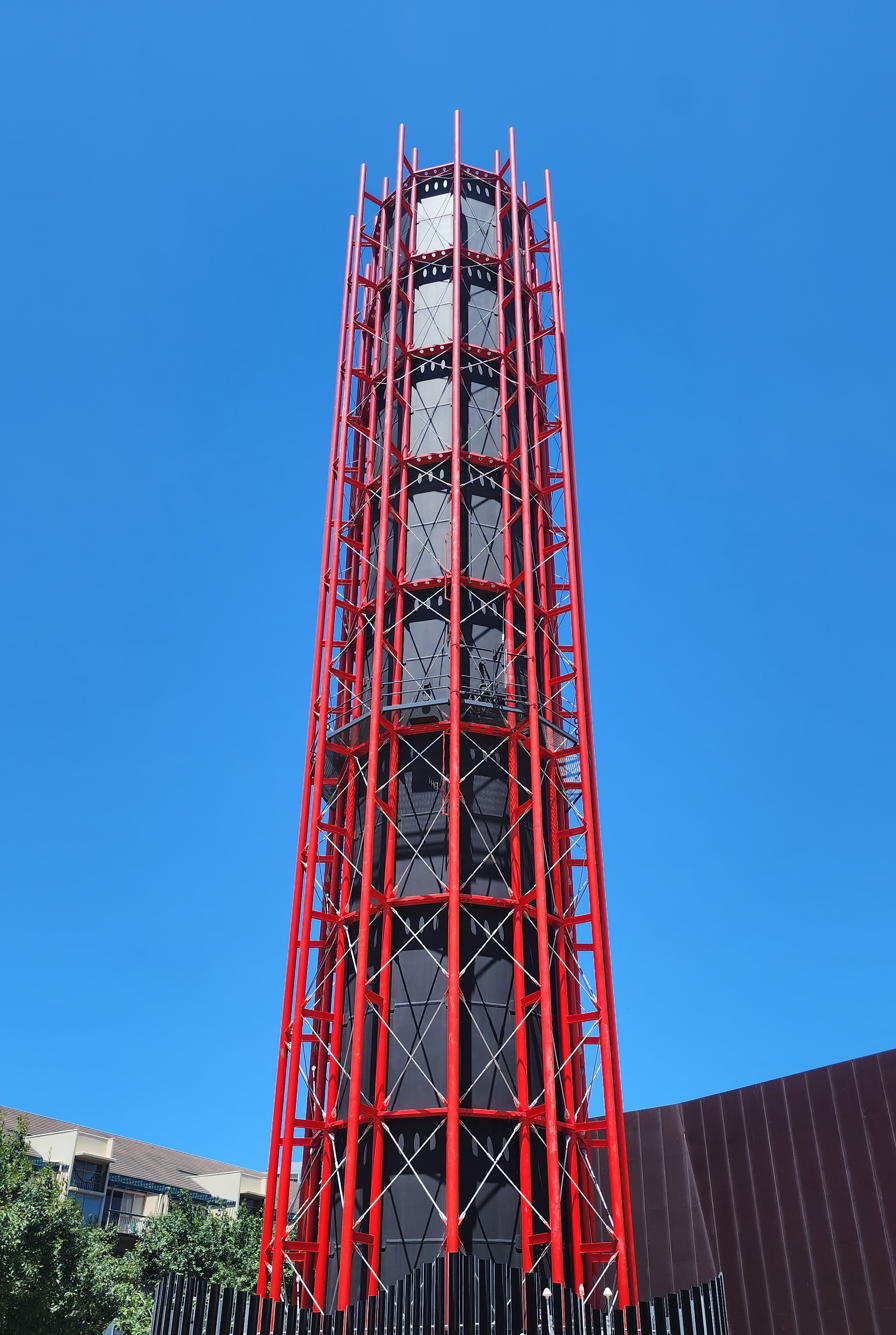
ACCA tower

In its first decade, ACCA had already commissioned over 200 new works by both Australian and International Artists. Every year ACCA commissions six or seven new Australian artists for exhibition. Featured Australian artists have included Pat Brassington, Patricia Piccinini, alongside international artists such as Martin Creed, Barbara Kruger, Tacita Dean, Jenny Holzer and Joseph Kosuth. ACCA also presents many thematic exhibitions, as well as public art through initiatives such as the Big Wall project.

From 15 December 2017 to 25 March 2018, ACCA held Unfinished Business: Perspectives on Art and Feminism, curated in collaboration with Paola Balla, Julie Ewington, Vikki McInnes, and Elvis Richardson, Unfinished Business sought to engage critical but underrepresented practices from Australia, with a focus on contemporary practices and intersectional feminist perspectives. The exhibition featured 40 newly commissioned and existing works by women artists including Ali Gumillya Baker, Atong Atem, Maria Kozic, Mikayla Dwyer, and Vivienne Binns.

In November 2022, A survey exhibition of 15 years of works by Paul Yore, titled WORD MADE FLESH, was held from September to November 2022.

== Lecture series ==
In 2019 a two-year lecture series entitled Defining Moments: Australian Exhibition Histories 1968–1999 was launched, intended to "take a deeper look at the moments that have shaped Australian art since 1968... the game changers in Australian art... addressing key contemporary art exhibitions staged over the last three decades of the twentieth century", and examining how they have affected art history and, more broadly, Australian culture in the 21st century.

In 2020, former director of the 4A Centre for Contemporary Asian Art Mikala Tai talked about the founding of Gallery 4A, the inaugural exhibition in 1997, and its impact on contemporary art discourse. Former director of the Institute of Modern Art in Brisbane and artist Peter Cripps co-presented Recession art and other strategies, referring to the name of a 1985 exhibition at the IMA.
