= One Montgomery =

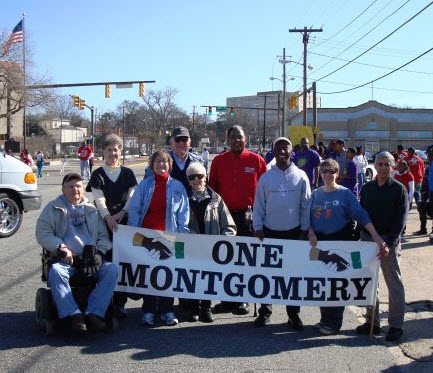
One Montgomery

One Montgomery is a diverse group of citizens in Montgomery, Alabama who seek to promote understanding and trust between people of different racial and ethnic backgrounds through discussion, education, social interaction, and enhanced personal relationships. Its membership has included numerous individuals who have been active in the Civil Rights Movement in Alabama, including the late Johnnie Carr (who was a close friend of Rosa Parks), the late Rev. Dr. Robert Graetz (who was pastor of a black congregation in Montgomery and worked closely with Rev. Dr. Martin Luther King Jr. during the bus boycott); his wife, the late Jeannie Graetz, who with her husband promoted civil rights for all persons regardless of race, ethnicity or gender; the late Lt. Gen. Charles Cleveland, a Korean War Ace who served as commander of Air University at Maxwell Air Force Base, and other community leaders.

== History ==
The group continues to meet regularly, and embraces diversity as an essential strength of American society. It was founded in 1984 following the "Todd Road Incident" in which visiting blacks were charged with assaulting two white plainclothes policemen who, failing to identify themselves, forcefully entered a residence which they thought was a crack house but in which the visitors were holding a post-funeral gathering. In the ensuing struggle both policemen were wounded, resulting in the visitors being charged with serious offenses. After a polarizing trial, they were acquitted. The trial resulted in severe racial stress in the city and area.

As a result of the Todd Road Incident city officials and concerned citizens met and formed One Montgomery, Leadership Montgomery (a civic training program), and citizens formed the Friendly Supper Club, which meets at the Alabama State University faculty dining room at 6:00pm on the first Monday of each month.

One Montgomery has played an important role in promoting mutual understanding during several racially charged situations. For example, when organizations recognized as hate groups by the Southern Poverty Law Center staged demonstrations and marched up Dexter Avenue toward the state Capitol, One Montgomery hosted a counter-vigil at the nearby Civil Rights Memorial

== Activities ==
Despite such occasional activities, One Montgomery is not an "activist" organization but rather a forum for networking and education. The group is always seeking members who are interested in meaningful and civil dialog. Membership is open to the public, with a goal of achieving diversity of racial and ethnic backgrounds and age groups. Dues are reasonable. Guests may attend two meetings before having to pay dues.

One Montgomery meets weekly on Tuesday mornings from 7:00 to 8:00 a.m.(Central Time). During the Covid-19 epidemic the meetings became virtual, by Zoom. In October 2022 in-person meetings with breakfast resumed on the first Tuesday of each month at the Church of the Ascension. Other meetings are still virtual, and there is virtual access to the in-person meetings. Each meeting starts with the Pledge of Allegiance and a moment of silence. One meeting per month is reserved for disposition of business and open discussion. Other meetings feature a presentation by a guest speaker or member on some topic of interest. On controversial topics, the group often invites a speaker to present the other side of the argument at a subsequent meeting.

Members are encouraged to participate in civic activities that improve diversity relations.
