= Antony Costa =

English singer and songwriter

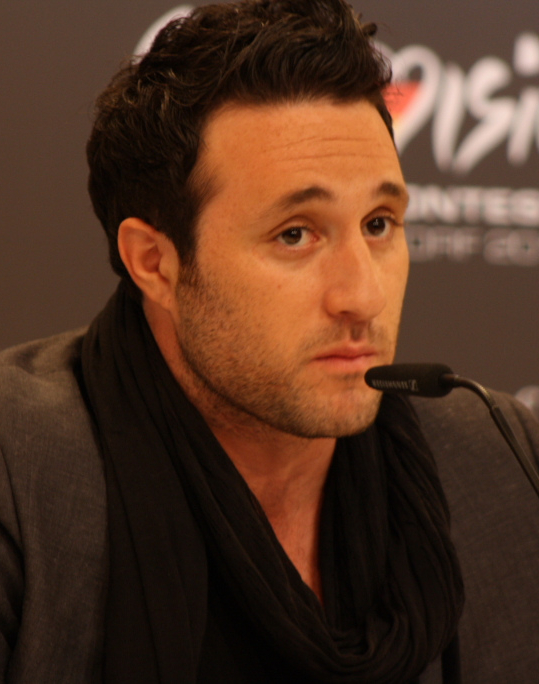
- Costa in 2011

Background information
- Born: Antony Daniel Costa; 23 June 1981 (age 45); Edgware, North London, England
- Genres: Pop; pop rock; R&B
- Occupations: Singer; songwriter
- Years active: 1997–present
- Label: Globe

Antony Daniel Costa (born 23 June 1981) is an English singer and songwriter. He is a member of the boy band Blue.

== Early life ==
Costa was born in Edgware, North London. Costa attended Hendon School in nearby Barnet. He is half-Greek Cypriot, half-Jewish. He attended the American Academy of Larnaca before moving back to England.

== Career ==
One of Costa's earliest television roles was as a pupil in Steven Moffat's sitcom Chalk. He then went on to appear in the BBC children's drama Grange Hill.

=== 2000–2005: Career with Blue ===
In early 2000, Costa and Duncan James convinced Lee Ryan and Simon Webbe to form the group Blue. Blue's R&B-influenced pop allowed the group to achieve commercial success in the United Kingdom and many other countries, including Ireland, Portugal, Belgium, Italy, France, Australia and New Zealand.

The band released their debut single, "All Rise", in May 2001, and it reached number 4 on the UK Singles Chart. Their follow-up single, "Too Close", was released in August 2001, peaking at No. 1 on the UK Singles Chart. They went on to achieve a second number one in November with the ballad "If You Come Back". The album All Rise was released in time for Christmas and reached number one, eventually selling in excess of 1.8 million albums in the UK. The final single from the album, "Fly By II", reached number six in March 2002.

Their second studio album, One Love, was released in October 2002, entering at No. 1 on the UK Albums Chart and selling more than 150,000 copies. Three singles were released from the album: "One Love", which peaked at No. 3; "Sorry Seems to Be the Hardest Word", featuring vocals by Elton John, which peaked at No. 1; and "U Make Me Wanna", which peaked at No. 4.

Their third studio album, Guilty, was released in autumn 2003, entering at No. 1 on the UK Albums Chart and selling 100,000 copies in the week of release. The album spawned four singles, including the title track, "Guilty", which peaked at No. 2; "Signed, Sealed, Delivered, I'm Yours", featuring vocals by Stevie Wonder and Angie Stone, which peaked at No. 11; "Breathe Easy", which peaked at No. 4; and "Bubblin'", which peaked at No. 9.

Then followed the release of Best of Blue, including three tracks only previously in Japan: "The Gift", "It's Alright" and "Elements". By the indication of the album booklet, a live version of "Lonely This Christmas" from CD:UK was intended to be track seven on the album; however, it was removed from the track listing for unknown reasons. The album was released in July 2005, becoming available in several European countries, as well as Japan, Thailand and China. However, it was a commercial failure and failed to chart anywhere. The album was not released in the UK, despite copies being widely available.

=== 2006–2010: Heart Full of Soul, stage and television ===
Costa was a contestant on the 2005 series of I'm a Celebrity... Get Me Out of Here! and was evicted from the programme on 3 December 2005 after fourteen days.

He released his debut solo single, "Do You Ever Think of Me", in February 2006. The single made its debut and peaked at No. 19 on the UK Singles Chart. Costa worked on the song with songwriter John McLaughlin and performed live with Scottish session musician Paul Boyd.

He went on to compete in the 2006 Eurovision: Making Your Mind Up programme to find a competitor to represent the UK in the Eurovision Song Contest 2006, but did not win the honour, with "It's a Beautiful Thing".

In June 2006, Costa posed naked for Cosmopolitan magazine's "10 Years of Naked Male Centrefolds", alongside other stars including singer Ronan Keating, actor Danny Dyer, Labour MP Jim Devine, and television presenter Craig Doyle.

Costa's debut album, Heart Full of Soul, was released on 3 July 2006, only in Japan, by his record label, Globe Records.

From 10 April 2006, Costa played the lead role of Mickey Johnstone in the London production of the long-running musical Blood Brothers, directed and produced by Bill Kenwright; his contract ran to February 2007. From March, Costa toured the UK in the tenth anniversary tour of Boogie Nights.

Costa had his first solo UK tour in February and March 2008, performing songs from his debut album. His UK tour had eighteen dates, which started on 16 February 2008 at The Brindley in Runcorn, and finished on 26 March 2008 in Barrow in Furness.

He modelled for Giorgio Armani in late 2008.

Costa has appeared twice on the BBC pop quiz Never Mind the Buzzcocks in 2006 and 2008.

He played Jack in the 2009/2010 pantomime, Jack and the Beanstalk, in Ipswich. He toured with the production Popstar: The Musical, playing the part of Cal between April and July 2010, at a series of theatres across the UK.

Costa took part in a celebrity version of the TV show Total Wipeout which aired on 18 September 2010.

=== 2011–present: Return with Blue ===
The group represented the United Kingdom at the 2011 Eurovision Song Contest in Düsseldorf, Germany, with the song "I Can", coming in 11th place with 100 points.

Blue released their fourth studio album, Roulette, on 25 January 2013 with "Hurt Lovers" as the lead single.

On 21 February 2013, it was confirmed that the group would be joining The Big Reunion, in which six groups from the past would re-form for a one-off gig, including Liberty X, Atomic Kitten and 5ive. From May 2013, the group planned to tour the UK and Ireland with the other groups in The Big Reunion concert series.

On 27 March 2013, the group announced they would embark on their first headlining tour later in the year, their first tour in nearly ten years.

In April 2016, Costa joined the cast of the musical Save The Last Dance For Me, playing the part of Milton, touring the UK until October 2016.

On 30 November 2021, Blue confirmed they would be going on an arena tour to celebrate their 20th anniversary. It was also confirmed that Atomic Kitten would be supporting them on the tour. When interviewed on This Morning, the group confirmed that they were back in the studio recording, and that a new album was expected to follow along with the tour.

On 11 April 2022, the group announced that their sixth studio album, Heart & Soul, would be released on 9 September 2022. On 20 May the group unveiled the track listing for the album on their social media accounts, following with the first single, "Haven't Found You Yet". On 29 June 2022, the group released the single "Dance with Me", a cover of the 2001 112 single.

== Personal life ==
Costa is a lifelong supporter and season ticket-holder of Tottenham Hotspur.

== Filmography ==
Television
Year	Title	Role	Notes
1997	Chalk	Boy	"The Object of Desire" (Series 1, Episode 4)
1997	Grange Hill	Sixth Form Boy	Supporting role
2005	I'm a Celebrity...Get Me Out of Here!	Himself / Competitor	Series 5
2006	Dancing on Ice	Himself / Guest judge	(Series 4, Episode 17)
2008	Never Mind the Buzzcocks	Himself	(Series 21, Episode 07)
2009	Casualty	Dave	"Second Chance" (Series 24, Episode 12)
2009	Lights Out	Douglas	Short film
2009–10	Angela and Friends	Himself / Commentator ("friend")	
2011	Celebrity Five Go To...	Himself / Competitor	Series 1; Winner
2012	The Wright Stuff	Himself / Panellist	Series 17
2012	Lemon La Vida Loca	Himself	Series 1, Episode 2
2014	Casualty	Matthew Pendleton	"Entrenched" (Series 29, Episode 9)
2014	Holby City	Matthew Pendleton	"Chaos in her Wings" (Series 17, Episode 4)
2017	Those Four Walls	Aaron	
2018	Train Set	Nathan	
2018	The Bromley Boys	Football Show Presenter	
2022	When Films Go Horribly Wrong	Himself	
2024	Richard Osman's House of Games	Himself	Season 8, Episodes 21-25
2025	Celebrity Masterchef	Himself / Competitor	Season 20

== Discography ==
=== Albums ===
List of albums, with selected chart positions
Title	Album details	Peak chart positions
Title	Album details	JPN
Heart Full of Soul	Released: 3 July 2006 (Japan); Label: Globe Records; Format: CD, digital download	196

=== Singles ===
List of singles, with selected chart positions and certifications
Title	Year	Peak chart positions	Album
Title	Year	UK	Album
"Do You Ever Think of Me"	2006	19	Heart Full of Soul
