= Robert Juniper =

Australian artist (1929–2012)

- Born: Robert Litchfield Juniper; 7 January 1929; Merredin, Western Australia, Australia
- Died: 20 December 2012 (aged 83); Darlington, Western Australia, Australia
- Known for: Painting, printmaking and sculpting
- Spouse(s): Robin-Ann (née Brennan; divorced); Amanda (née Silburn; divorced); Patricia "Trisha" (née Lowe; his death)
- Awards: See awards

Robert Litchfield Juniper, AM (7 January 1929 – 20 December 2012) was an Australian artist, art teacher, illustrator, painter, printmaker and sculptor.

== Early life ==
Juniper was born in the wheat-belt town of Merredin, Western Australia. He studied commercial art and industrial design at Beckenham School of Art, England. After returning to Western Australia he painted, taught and exhibited in Perth. He was particularly championed by Rose Skinner, a local exhibitor. He was a long-term resident of Darlington and at different stages in its history involved with the Darlington Arts Festival.

== Teaching ==
Juniper taught art at Perth College and Hale School in the 1960s, and at Guildford Grammar School in the late 1960s & early 1970s. In the 1960s his excursions into the Australian outback with Ian Parkes was the inspiration for the subject matter a large part of his abstract style of art.

He designed the coat of arms for the Commonwealth Law Courts in Perth, in 1992. His works are held in numerous collections, including the Art Gallery of Western Australia, the Art Gallery of New South Wales, the National Gallery of Australia, the National Gallery of Victoria, the Queensland Art Gallery and Parliament House, Canberra.

== Exhibitions ==
Juniper was given many solo and group exhibitions throughout Australia and overseas, including a major retrospective in 1999 at the Art Gallery of Western Australia, Perth.

He was represented for many years by Gomboc Gallery. Right up until shortly before his death at the age of 83, he continued to paint regularly, with increasing 'hands-on' assistance from his wife and remained both a highly productive artist and an inspiration and mentor to many other Australian artists.

== Late work ==
Juniper was commissioned to work on a feature window in the restored Bunbury Catholic Cathedral. This work was completed in 2011.

== Death ==
In 2002, Juniper suffered a stroke that robbed him of the use of his left hand. He became ill in October 2011 when fluid gathered on his lung. Juniper died at his Darlington home on 20 December 2012 at the age of 83.

== Awards ==
- 1954, 57, 59, 60, 62 Perth Prize for Contemporary Art
- 1966 T. E. Wardle Invitation Prize
- 1975 Wynne Prize
- 1979 Wynne Prize
- 1984 Honorary Doctorate, University of Western Australia, Perth
- 1988 Kingfisher Prize, New South Wales
- 1998 State Living Treasures Award, Ministry for Culture and the Arts, Western Australia
- 2003 Centenary Medal of Federation for service to Australian landscape painting and contemporary art
- 2004 Awarded medal for services to art, The Painters and Sculptors Association of Australia
- 2011 Appointed Member of the Order of Australia for service to the visual arts, particularly as an Australian landscape painter and contemporary artist

== Personal life ==
Juniper was married three times and had four children, all by his first wife, Robin-Ann (née Brennan): Sato (previously Linda); Ben (Benedict); Sam (previously Damian) and Bec (Rebecca). They all live and work as professionals in various fields in Western Australia. He had 11 grandchildren and step-grandchildren and three great-grandchildren. His second wife is Amanda (née Silburn) and his third wife is Patricia (née Lowe).

== See also ==
- List of public art in Brisbane

== Printed works ==
- Todd, Trevor (1977) Mason Judy, illustrated by Robert Juniper. Sydney : Methuen of Australia ISBN 0-454-00027-8
- (1982) Asphodel [illustrated by] Robert Juniper, [text by] Lilla Cole. Fremantle, W.A. : Fremantle Arts Centre Press ISBN 0-909144-59-1 (pbk.)
