= Vault (sculpture) =

Sculpture in Melbourne, Victoria, Australia

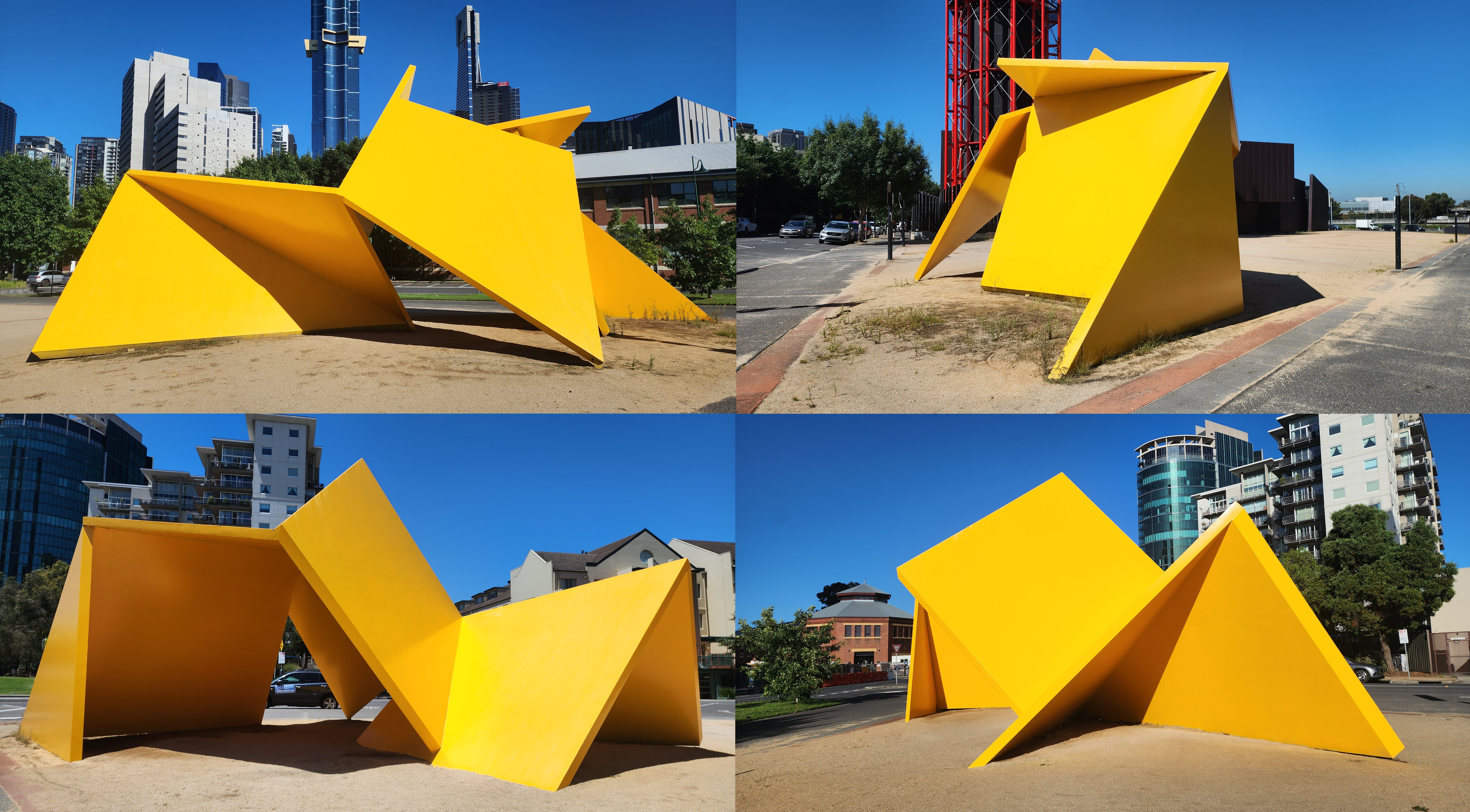
- Vault at Southbank, pictured in 2024.
- Artist: Ron Robertson-Swann
- Year: 1978
- Type: abstract, minimalist
- Medium: prefabricated steel
- Location: Australian Centre for Contemporary Art, Southbank, Victoria, Australia; 37°49′33.87″S 144°58′3.82″E

Vault (popularly known as The Yellow Peril) is a public sculpture located in Southbank, Melbourne, Victoria, Australia. The work of sculptor Ron Robertson-Swann, Vault is an abstract, minimalist sculpture built of large thick flat polygonal sheets of prefabricated steel, assembled in a way that suggests movement. It is painted yellow.

Presently located outside the Australian Centre for Contemporary Art, it is a key work in Melbourne's public art collection, and of considerable historical importance to the city.

Vault has been controversial throughout its existence. Commissioned by the Melbourne City Council after winning a competition in May 1978, for the newly built Melbourne City Square, the sculpture was not even built before it began to attract criticism from certain media and council factions, on the grounds that its modern form was felt to be unsympathetic to the location. The cost of $70,000 was also felt to be excessive.

The sculpture had no official name for over two years, and acquired a number of nicknames during this time. Robertson-Swann himself called it The Thing. The steelworkers who constructed it called it Steelhenge. Newspapers gave it the derogatory nickname "The Yellow Peril", a name which has stuck. Robertson-Swann officially named it Vault in September 1980.

Installed in the City Square for its opening in May 1980, the Melbourne City Council voted to remove it only three months later. The controversy was one of many issues that led to the State Government's sacking of the City Council in December 1980. The Builders Labourers Federation announced they would ban any attempts to move it.

In July 1981, Vault was dismantled and then re-erected at Batman Park, a much less prominent part of the city. It remained there until 2002 when it was moved to a position outside the Australian Centre for Contemporary Art in Southbank.

Following a heritage study of the Southbank area in 2017, the sculpture was recommended for heritage protection through inclusion in the City of Melbourne Planning Scheme Heritage Overlay, which was applied in 2020. In May 2024 it was proposed for listing at the State level on the Victorian Heritage Register.

Vault's design has inspired many built and propositional architectural projects in Melbourne. Several of Denton Corker Marshall's works have "adopted peril's yellow almost as a point of pride and solidarity", while its form has been referenced in some works by ARM Architecture (Ashton Raggatt McDougall), including Storey Hall (1996) on Swanston Street. Vault is also referenced in the yellow origami-like bases of tram stops in the Melbourne city centre, and the yellow sculptural work of the Citylink tollway's Melbourne International Gateway. Other Melbourne buildings that incorporate references to Vault include the Adelphi Hotel on Flinders Lane and St Jude's Church in Carlton.
