= Do You Ever Think of Me =

Single by Antony Costa

from the album Heart Full of Soul
- Released: 6 February 2006 (UK)
- Recorded: 2006
- Genre: Pop
- Length: 3:15
- Label: Globe
- Songwriters: Antony Costa, John McLaughlin, David Thomas, Simon Perry
- Producer: Simon Perry

"Do You Ever Think of Me" is the only single released by Blue member Antony Costa, from his debut solo album, Heart Full of Soul. The single was released on 6 February 2006. Due to an argument between Costa and his record label, this single remains his only release in the United Kingdom.

== Track listing ==
UK CD1

1. "Do You Ever Think of Me" (Radio Edit) – 3:15
2. "Shine Your Light" – 2:58

UK CD2

1. "Do You Ever Think of Me" (Radio Edit) – 3:15
2. "Runaway Train" – 3:07
3. "Learn to Love Again" – 2:54
4. "Do You Ever Think of Me" (Video) – 3:20

=== Chart performance ===
Chart (2006)	Peak position
UK Singles (OCC)	19
