= Heart Full of Soul (album) =

Studio album by Antony Costa
- Released: 3 July 2006 (Japan)
- Recorded: 2005–2006
- Studio: Stockholm, Sweden
- Genre: Pop
- Length: 63:08
- Label: Globe
- Producer: Simon Perry; David Thomas; John McLaughlin; Robbie Nevil; Dennis Johnson; Michael Daley

Singles from Heart Full of Soul
- 1. "Do You Ever Think of Me" Released: 19 June 2006

Heart Full of Soul is the debut solo studio album released by Blue band member and singer, Antony Costa. The album was released only in Japan.

== Background ==
The album was recorded over the course of two years, and was executively produced and co-written by Simon Perry, alongside songwriter John McLaughlin, musician David Thomas, and co-production from the likes of Robbie Nevil and Dennis Johnson. The album was released on 3 July 2006, exclusively in Japan, following an argument with Costa's record label preventing a release in the United Kingdom. It failed to chart highly in Japan, and shortly after, Costa was dropped from the label. Only one single was released from the album, Do You Ever Think of Me, which peaked at #19 on the UK Singles Chart.

== Production ==
The album was preceded by Costa's participation in Eurovision: Making Your Mind Up, where he attempted to represent the United Kingdom in the Eurovision Song Contest 2006, with the track "Beautiful Thing", co-written by McLaughlin, Michael Daley, Alison Pearce and Stanley Andrew. He came second, being beaten by eventual competition winner Daz Sampson, with his single "Teenage Life". The version of the album released in Japan uses a slightly different track listing to the original planned British release. The Japanese release contains the tracks "Predictable", "Never Too Late" and "I'll Keep Holding On", while the British release was due to include "Half a World Away", "Like I Do" and "Runaway Train", the former of which were released promotionally, but never released commercially. The tracks "Shine Your Light", "Runaway Train" and "Learn to Love Again" were also issued as B-sides to "Do You Ever Think of Me".

At the British Inspiration Awards on 24 May 2012, Costa stated that the inspiration to record the album came from his relationship with former fiancé Lucy Bolster, and their daughter, Emilie. He stated that the idea behind the concept of "Do You Ever Think of Me" stemmed from their break-up, and "Healing in Your Eyes" was written from a poem that Costa wrote about his daughter. While the album has never been released in the United Kingdom, "Do You Ever Think of Me" still received regular airplay on Chart Show TV and The Vault, in retrospective programmes surrounding Blue and each of their respective solo careers.

== Track listing ==
No.	Title	Writer(s)	Producer(s)	Length
1.	"Everywhere and Nowhere"	Simon Perry, David Thomas	Perry, Thomas	4:18
2.	"Fall From Grace"	Simon Perry, Robbie Nevil	Perry, Nevil	3:55
3.	"Forever Young"	Simon Perry, David Thomas	Perry, Thomas	4:12
4.	"Healing in Your Eyes"	John McLaughlin, Jonathan Shorten	McLaughlin	3:25
5.	"Heartaches and Bad Days"	Simon Perry, David Thomas	Perry, Thomas	5:07
6.	"Learn to Love Again"	Simon Perry, Keith Beauvis	Perry	4:29
7.	"Do You Ever Think of Me"	Simon Perry, David Thomas, John McLaughlin, Antony Costa	Perry, Thomas, McLaughlin	3:15
8.	"Miracle"	Simon Perry, David Thomas, John McLaughlin	Perry, Thomas, McLaughlin	3:22
9.	"Beautiful Thing"	John McLaughlin, Stanley Andrew, Michael Daley, Alison Pearce	McLaughlin, Daley	3:57
10.	"Shine Your Light"	Simon Perry, David Thomas, John McLaughlin	Perry, Thomas, McLaughlin	2:58
11.	"Straight to My Heart"	Simon Perry, David Thomas, John McLaughlin	Perry, Thomas, McLaughlin	3:35

Japanese bonus tracks
No.	Title	Writer(s)	Producer(s)	Length
12.	"Predictable"	John McLaughlin, David James, Alan Ross	McLaughlin	3:44
13.	"Keep Holding On"	Simon Perry, John McLaughlin	Perry, McLaughlin	3:19
14.	"Never Too Late"	John McLaughlin, David James	McLaughlin	4:14

Cancelled British version
No.	Title	Writer(s)	Producer(s)	Length
1.	"Everywhere and Nowhere"	Simon Perry, David Thomas	Perry, Thomas	4:18
2.	"Fall From Grace"	Simon Perry, Robbie Nevil	Perry, Thomas	3:55
3.	"Half a World Away"	Simon Perry, Mikael Albertsson, Niklas Pettersson	Perry	3:14
4.	"Forever Young"	Simon Perry, David Thomas	Perry, Thomas	4:12
5.	"Healing in Your Eyes"	John McLaughlin, Jonathan Shorten	McLaughlin	3:25
6.	"Heartaches and Bad Days"	Simon Perry, David Thomas	Perry, Thomas	5:07
7.	"Learn to Love Again"	Simon Perry, Keith Beauvis	Perry	4:29
8.	"Do You Ever Think of Me"	Simon Perry, David Thomas, John McLaughlin, Antony Costa	Perry, Thomas, McLaughlin	3:15
9.	"Miracle"	Simon Perry, David Thomas, John McLaughlin	Perry, Thomas, McLaughlin	3:22
10.	"Beautiful Thing"	John McLaughlin, Stanley Andrew, Michael Daley, Alison Pearce	McLaughlin, Daley	3:57
11.	"Shine Your Light"	Simon Perry, David Thomas, John McLaughlin	Perry, Thomas, McLaughlin	2:58
12.	"Straight to My Heart"	Simon Perry, David Thomas, John McLaughlin	Perry, Thomas, McLaughlin	3:35
13.	"Runaway Train"	Christopher Cawte, Dennis Johnson	Perry, Johnson	3:07
14.	"Like I Do"	Simon Perry, David Thomas	Perry, Thomas	3:03

== Charts ==
Weekly chart performance for Heart Full of Soul
Chart (2006)	Peak position
Japanese Albums (Oricon)	196
