= Gratz (surname) =

Gratz is a surname. Notable people with the surname include:

- Alan Gratz, American author
- Barnard Gratz (1738–1801), American merchant, one of the founders of the Jewish community of Philadelphia
- Benjámin Grátz, Hungarian swimmer
- David E. Gratz, American engineer
- Dennis Gratz, Bosnian politician
- Dwayne Gratz, American football player
- Gusztáv Gratz, Hungarian politician
- Hyman Gratz, founder of the Gratz College
- Joan C. Gratz, American artist and filmmaker
- Karl Gratz, Austrian-born Wehrmacht fighter pilot
- Leopold Gratz, Austrian politician
- Peter Aloys Gratz, German biblical scholar
- Rebecca Gratz, American educator and philanthropist

== See also ==
- Graetz (disambiguation)
