= Gidon Graetz =

Swiss-Israeli sculptor (1929–2025)

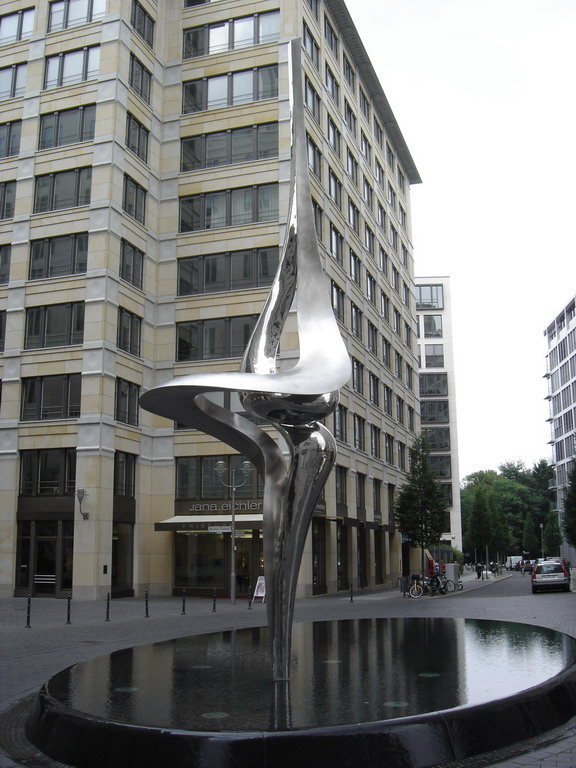
Graetz sculpture Phoenix (2003) in Berlin

Gidon Graetz (Hebrew: גדעון גרץ; 29 November 1929 – 3 June 2025) was a Swiss-Israeli-born Italian sculptor. He studied in the mid-1950s at Accademia delle Belle Arti in Florence and at Les Beaux-Arts in Paris.

== Life and career ==
Graetz was born on 29 November 1929. His public art sculptures are found widespread in cities such as Zurich, Detroit, New York City, Los Angeles, Brisbane, Chicago and Berlin, and has exhibited work in Europe, Australia and the United States.

Settled in a castle in Fiesole overlooking Florence in Tuscany, Graetz was married to Sunniva Rasmussen, and among their four children is the Tuscan winemaker Bibi Graetz.

Graetz died on 3 June 2025, at the age of 95.

== See also ==
- List of public art in Brisbane
