= Clarence Osborne scandal =

Australian sex scandal

Clarence Osborne
- Born: 1917 or 1918
- Died: 12 September 1979 (aged 61); Brisbane
- Cause of death: Suicide
- Citizenship: Australia
- Occupation: Court reporter
- Years active: 1950s–1979
- Known for: Allegedly having sexual interactions with 2,500 male adolescents

Clarence Howard-Osborne (1917 or 1918 – died 1979) was an Australian court reporter who is estimated to have interacted sexually with about 2,500 male adolescents. Osborne was reported by multiple investigations to have related sexually with an estimated number of 2,500 male teenagers over a period of about 20 years, including with some youths belonging to prestigious families from Brisbane. Some of the boys he allegedly interacted with continued to engage sexually with him during their adulthood. He died by suicide on 12 September 1979, one day after he was questioned by police for allegedly taking photographs of a nude boy. Osborne was never convicted of any sexual crime during his lifetime.

The affair was covered by news outlets including Truth, The Sunday Mail and ABC's Four Corners. It also inspired a 1987 play by Australian playwright Kevin Nemeth, in which fictional character Graham Hamlyn plays a role similar to Osborne's real life deeds. Osborne was also the main subject of 1981 criminology book The Man They Called a Monster, published by Cassell Australia. According to Gary Dowsett, Osborne's scandal was an early catalyst of the debate regarding sexual attraction to minors among the Australian media.
