= Elise Barney =

Australian postmistress (1810–1883)

Elise Barney (1810–1883) was a postmistress in Brisbane, Queensland, Australia, in 1855–1864. She was the first postmistress in Queensland.
