= Bart Stenhouse =

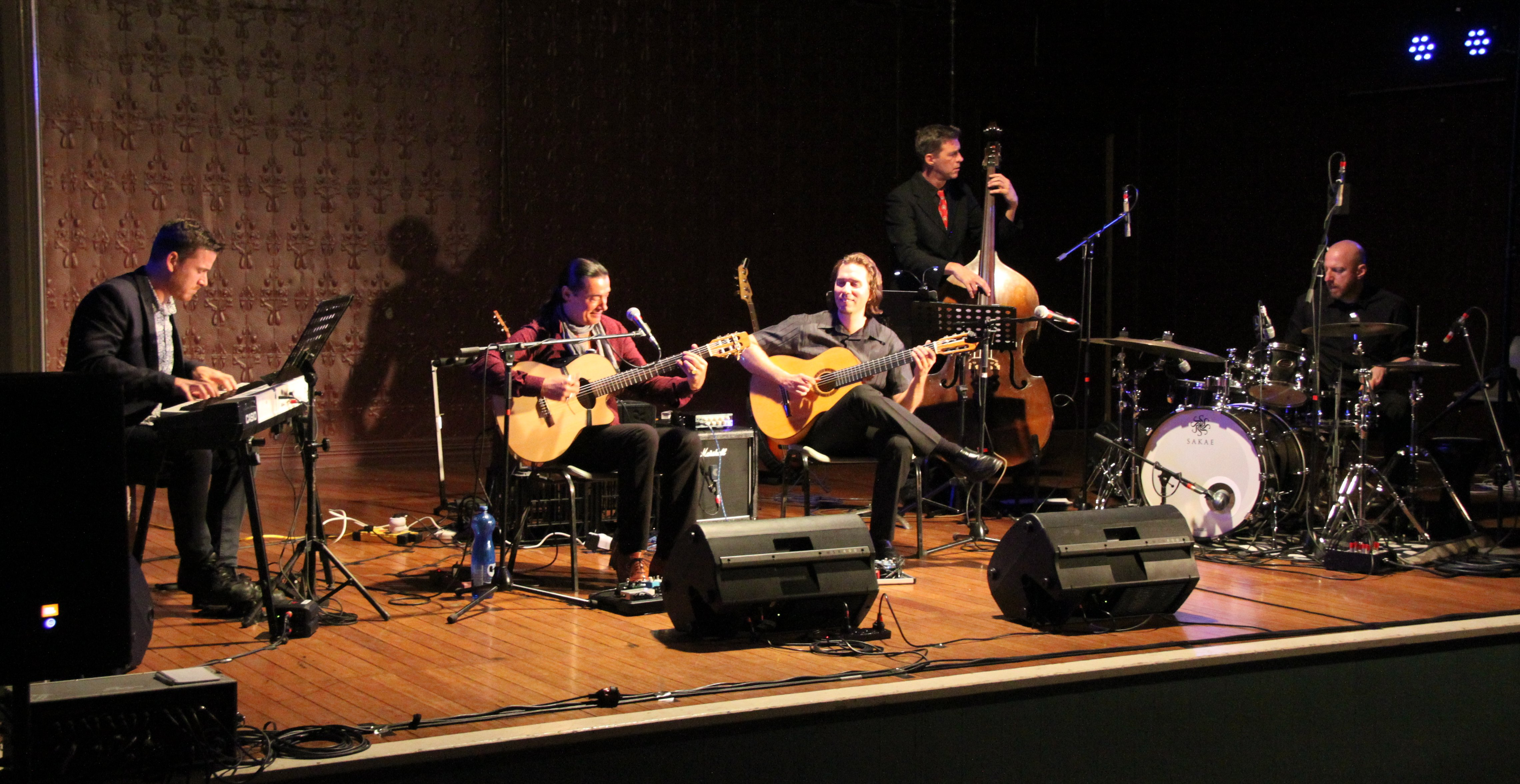
- Bart Stenhouse (centre) with group on stage at Bangalow, July 2017

Background information
- Born: Bart John R Stenhouse; 15 February 1984 (age 42); Brisbane, Queensland, Australia
- Genres: Jazz fusion, jazz, world fusion, progressive rock, roots, blues
- Occupations: Teacher, musician, producer, composer
- Instruments: Guitar, electric mandolin, bass guitar, double bass
- Years active: 2002–present
- Label: Stenhouse
- Website: bartstenhouse.com

Bart John R Stenhouse (born 15 February 1984, Brisbane, Queensland, Australia) is an Australian jazz fusion musician and teacher. He fuses jazz with elements of rock, flamenco, blues and Indian classical music. He formed the Bart Stenhouse Group to perform his work. In 2014 he issued a studio album, Blue Benares, with Abe Stewart, a percussionist. Stenhouse followed by in 2015, two further albums with the jazz fusion band, the Bart Stenhouse Group, these were Five Days in Granada and The Best of Times. He also teaches music and is a record producer.

== Style ==
Bart Stenhouse is a jazz fusion musician from the Queensland–Northern New South Wales area of Australia. Stenhouse cites John McLaughlin as a major influence. He composes, produces and mixes his own music. Bart Stenhouse has a deep interest in jazz, world, fusion and improvisational styles of music. His music is described as a technical and complex style which fuses electric jazz and rock with Indian and Spanish influences. The complexity of his compositions is cited by some fellow band members as an attractant to play his music. The complexity demands a great deal of skill on the part of the musicians. The group has included in its performances Cleon Barraclough, Trent Bryson-Dean, James Whiting, David Galea, Ben Byrne and Pat Farrell.

== Biography ==
Bart Stenhouse studied trumpet at primary school, and for three years of high school he continued with the trumpet and started playing guitar, eventually dropping the trumpet and focusing entirely on guitar. This early training in brass gave him an understanding of the complexities of brass instruments and an ear to hear what he is after. From 2002 to 2004 he studied Jazz Guitar at the Queensland Conservatorium. After being a member of a number of groups in his teenage and early twenties, he played with various bands ranging from rock, blues, roots, country through to jazz. Notable amongst these was Alysium, a Brisbane-based band with Bart Stenhouse lead guitar, Nick Quigley electric bass (now CEO, Jazz Music Institute) and Dane Pulvirenti on drums

Stenhouse teaches music and is a record producer, in addition to composing and performing his own work and playing with other groups and doing session work(Guitar, Electric bass).

Stenhouse released Blue Benares together with Abe Stewart, a percussionist, in 2014. In January 2015 he produced an album, Are We There Yet, for the band, Timbah. It was launched in Toowoomba in July. In October, The Bart Stenhouse Group released two albums, Five Days in Granada and The Best of Times. In January 2016 Stenhouse performed at the Indian International Guitar Festival. The performance in India raised the profile of Australian Jazz Fusion in Indian Music circles and generated publicity in the local Indian press for both the Bart Stenhouse Group and for one of its members, Pat Farrell

April 2017 saw Bart Stenhouse tour with the internationally renowned Indian tabla player Surojato Roy Bart and Surojato toured Northern New South Wales and coastal Queensland. This tour was billed as the "Rich history of Indian classical meeting modern flamenco jazz, Dynamic and spiritually moving world music".

In July 2017 Bart Stenhouse toured Australia with the legendary Gypsy Swing/Latin Fusion guitarist Lulo Reinhardt on their Global Guitar Conversations 2017 Australian Tour

April 2018 saw Bart Stenhouse touring Eastern Australia and Tasmania with Spanish Flamenco guitarist Paco Heredia.

In September 2018 Bart Stenhouse toured Eastern Australia and New Zealand with well known Sydney based gypsy guitarist Nigel Date.
