= Ron Robertson-Swann =

Australian sculptor (born 1941)

Ron Robertson-Swann OAM
- Born: Ronald Charles Robertson-Swann; 20 February 1941 (age 85); Sydney, New South Wales, Australia
- Education: Saint Martin's School of Art, London
- Known for: Sculpture
- Notable work: Vault – Melbourne (1980); Leviathan Play – Brisbane (1985)
- Awards: Order of Australia Medal (OAM)

Ronald Charles Robertson-Swann (born 20 February 1941) is an Australian sculptor, best known for his controversial abstract public sculpture Vault (1980), located in Melbourne. He is also known for the sculpture Leviathan Play (1985), located in Brisbane.

== Art career ==
Vault has been described as being in the Anthony Caro style, which he adopted after studying at Saint Martin's School of Art, London, in the 1960s. He studied under Lyndon Dadswell and was an assistant to Henry Moore. He is Head of Sculpture at the National Art School and is the artistic adviser to the popular annual exhibition Sculpture by the Sea. He was a founding member of the Visual Arts Board of the Australia Council and has won numerous awards including the Comalco Invitational Sculpture Award, the Transfeld Prize and the Alice Prize.

Graeme Sturgeon, the pre-eminent Australian sculpture historian and critic, described Robertson-Swann in 1980 as "the most consistent of the Classic Formalist, that is, the one most concerned to produce a sculpture which, while obviously of its era, transcends considerations of style in search of a timeless sense of rightness."

Robertson-Swann was awarded the Medal of the Order of Australia (OAM) in the 2002 Australia Day Honours in recognition of his "service to the arts as a sculptor, teacher, mentor and advocate for sculpture, and to art education in Australia".

== Notable artworks ==
- Vault – Melbourne (1980)
- Leviathan Play – Brisbane (1985)

== Artwork gallery ==
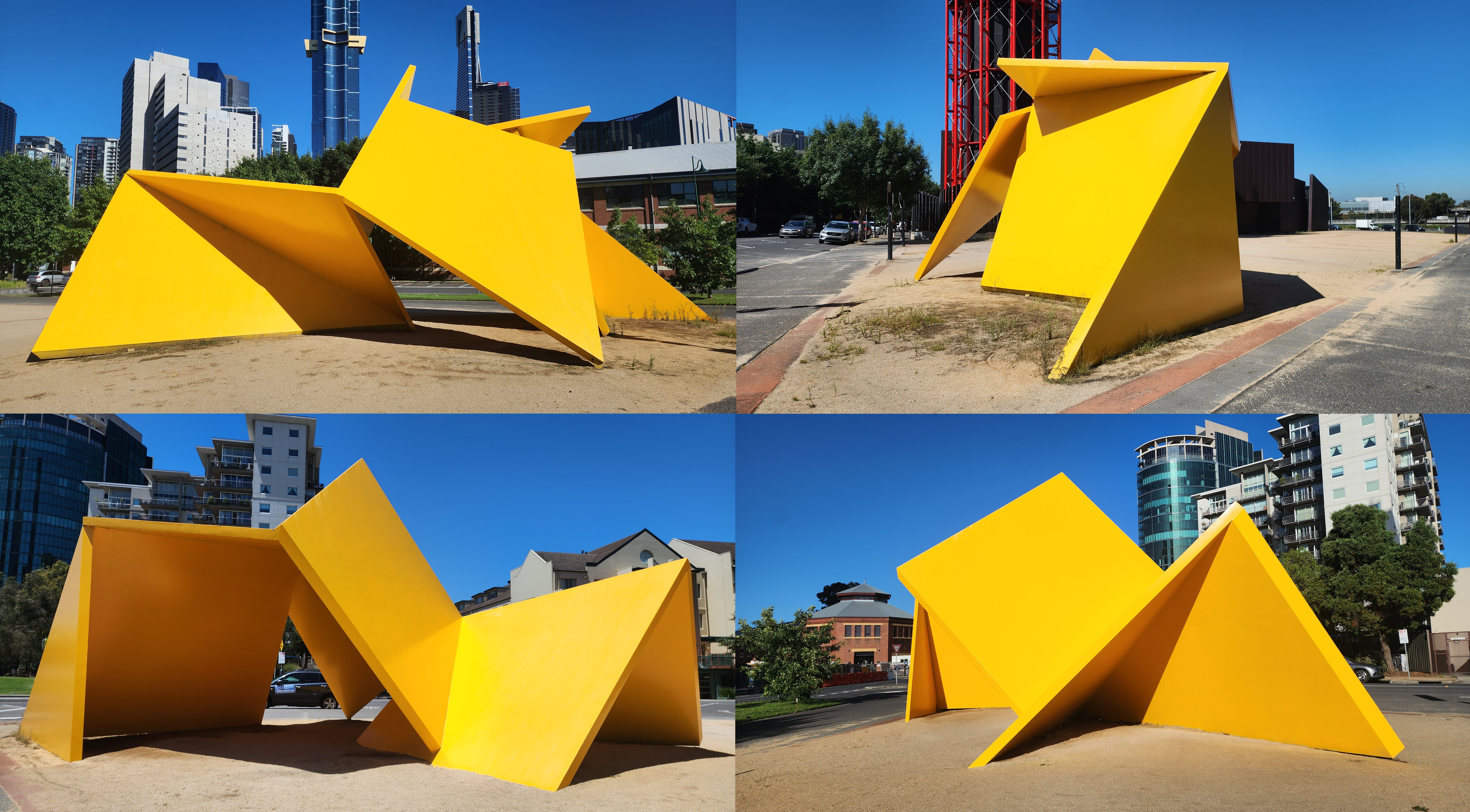
Vault – Melbourne (1980)

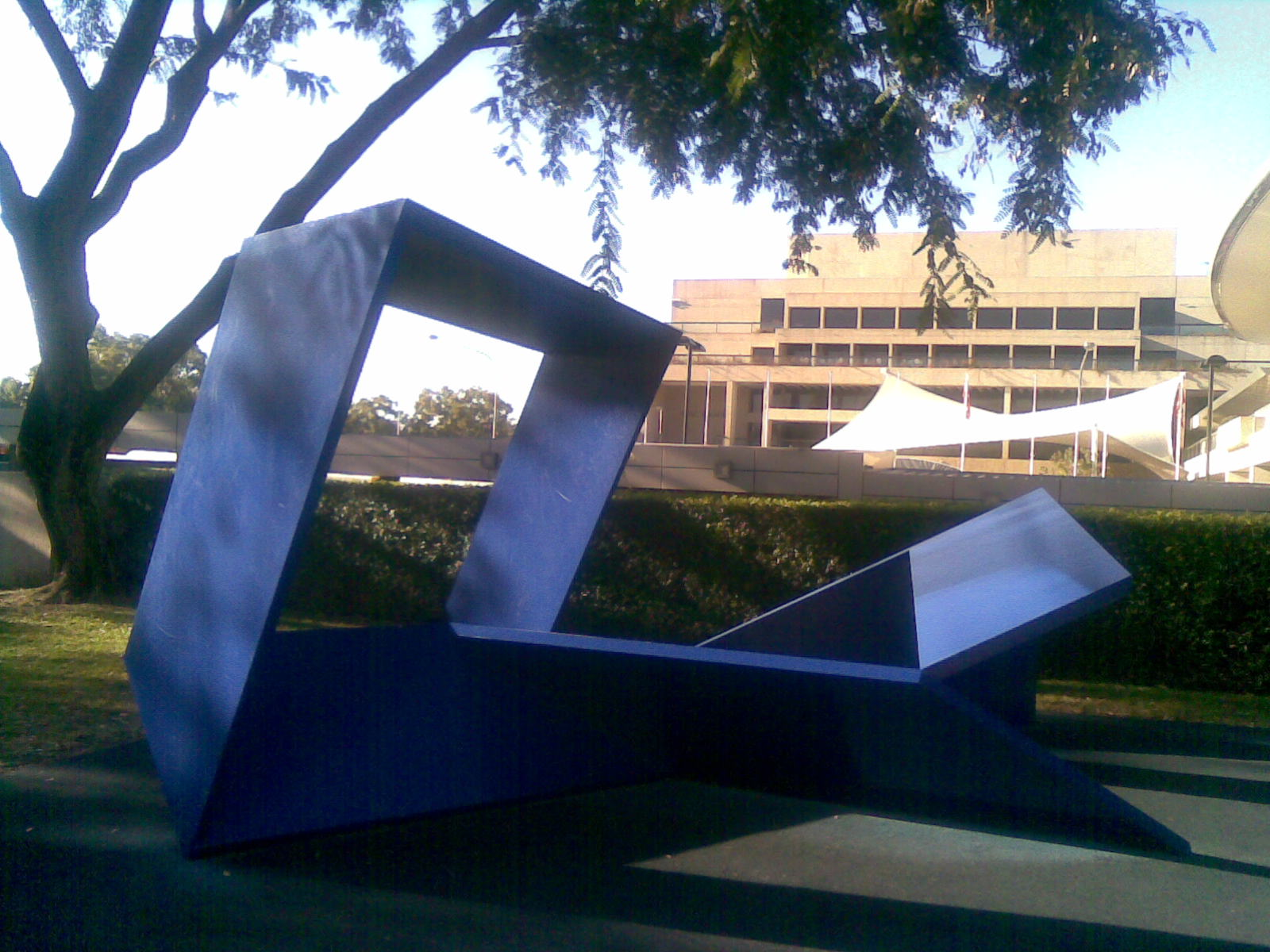
Leviathan Play – Brisbane (1985)
