= Jean Graetz =

American civil rights activist (1929–2020)

- Jean Graetz, from a 1951 bridal portrait.
- Born: Jean Ellis; December 24, 1929; East Springfield, Pennsylvania
- Died: December 16, 2020 (aged 90); Montgomery, Alabama
- Other name: Jeannie Graetz
- Known for: Civil rights activism
- Spouse: Robert Graetz

Jean Graetz (December 24, 1929 – December 16, 2020), born Jean Ellis, was an American civil rights activist. She and her clergyman husband Robert Graetz were active white supporters of the Montgomery bus boycott in 1955.

== Early life and education ==
Jean Ellis was born in East Springfield, Pennsylvania, the daughter of Marshall Ellis and Marian Smith Ellis. Her parents were farmers. She attended Capital University in Bexley, Ohio, but interrupted her studies to marry in 1951. She completed a bachelor's degree in education in 2015, at age 84, at Alabama State University.

== Activism ==
Graetz moved to Montgomery, Alabama in 1955, because her husband was called to the pulpit of the predominantly-black Trinity Evangelical Lutheran Church. As a pastor's wife in the South, she held an unpaid but respected position of community leadership. Within months after arriving, they found themselves drawn into the tumult of Montgomery's civil rights activism. The local chapter of the NAACP used a room in the church for meetings, and their neighbor Rosa Parks was arrested for civil disobedience. The Graetzes joined in planning the Montgomery bus boycott, arranging safe childcare, parking, and meals for protesters, and raising funds for the boycott. An empty plot of land behind the Graetzes’ house was used for parking the cars lent to boycott. She was targeted by those opposed to the boycott, with vandalism, death threats, and at least two bombs detonated in the yard of the parsonage.

Rev. Graetz was reassigned to a church in Ohio in 1958. The Graetzes returned to Montgomery in 1965 to join the march from Selma with Martin Luther King Jr. Jean Graetz and her husband remained active for political causes, including their first of several arrests in 2000 for blocking a parking garage during a gay rights protest in Cleveland. The couple retired to Montgomery in 2007, where they were consultants for the National Center for the Study of Civil Rights and African-American Culture at Alabama State University.

A 2018 auction of a handwritten note by Mrs. Parks discussing her friendship with the Graetz family was bought by the Graetzes themselves for $9,375 and donated to the National Center for the Study of Civil Rights and African-American Culture at Alabama State.

== Personal life ==
Jean married Robert Graetz, a Lutheran minister, in 1951. They had seven children. Robert Graetz died in September 2020, and she died a few months later, from lung cancer, in their Montgomery home, aged 90.
