= Christopher Trotter =

Australian sculptor

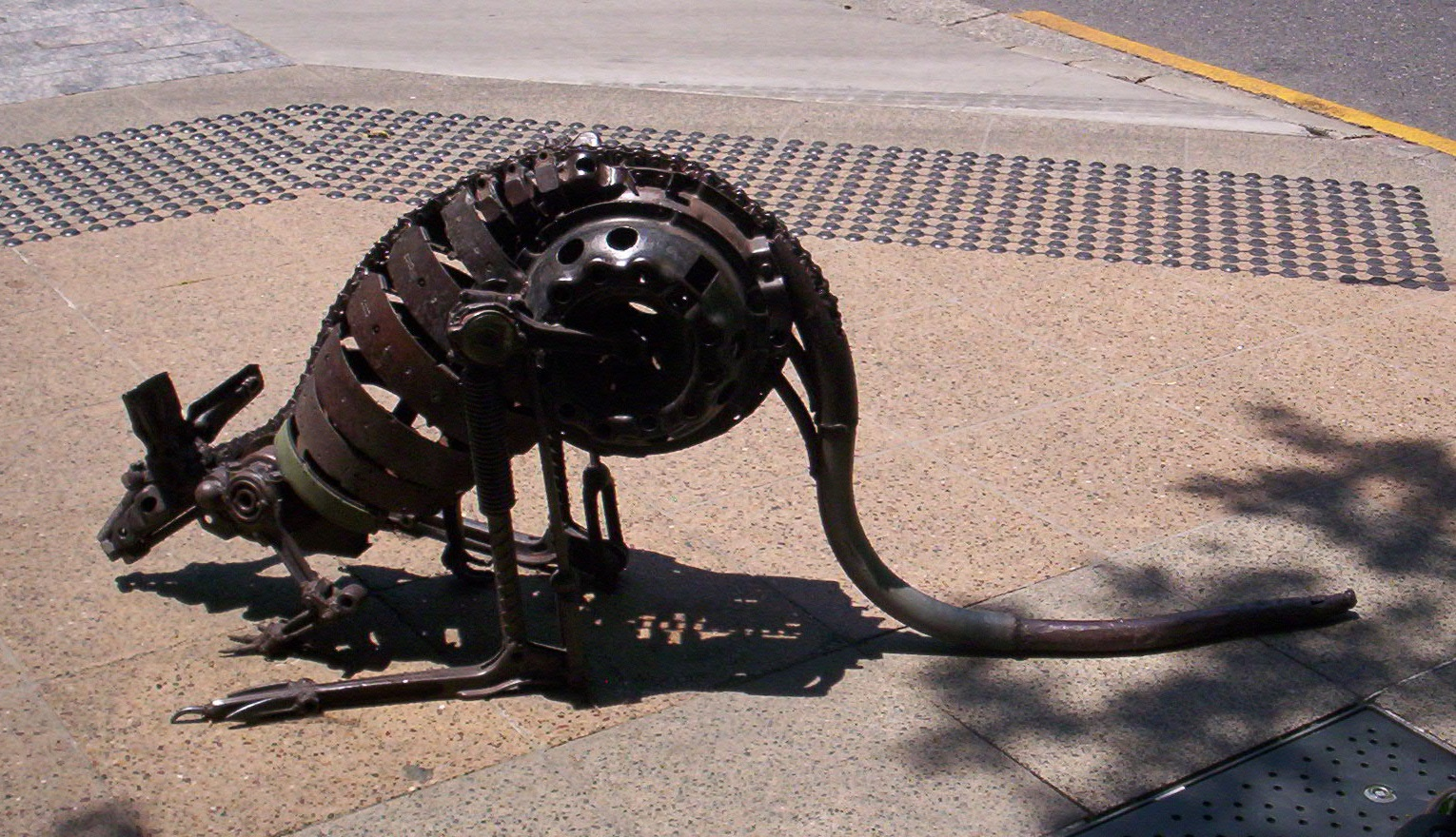
City Roo sculpture in George Street, Brisbane

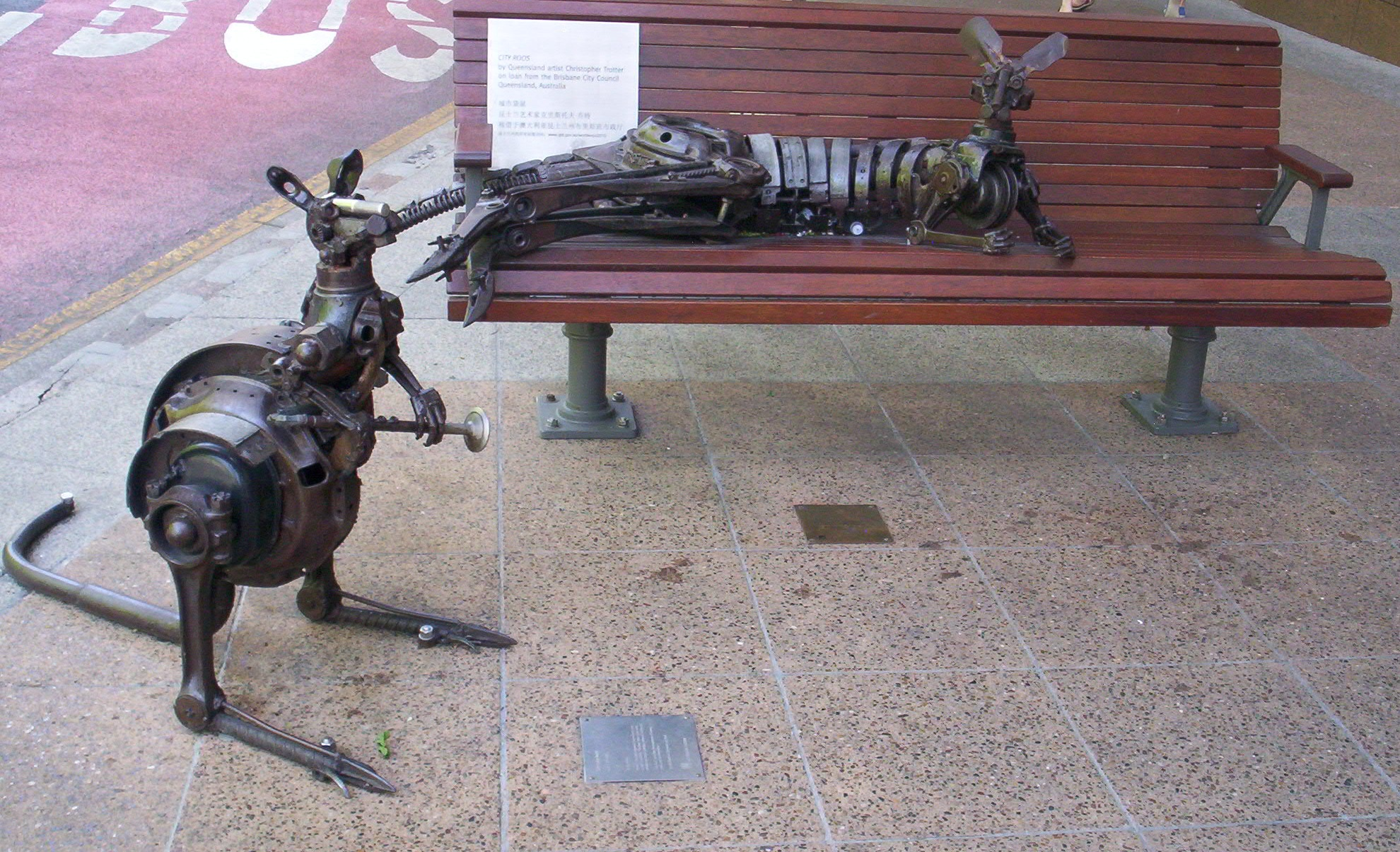

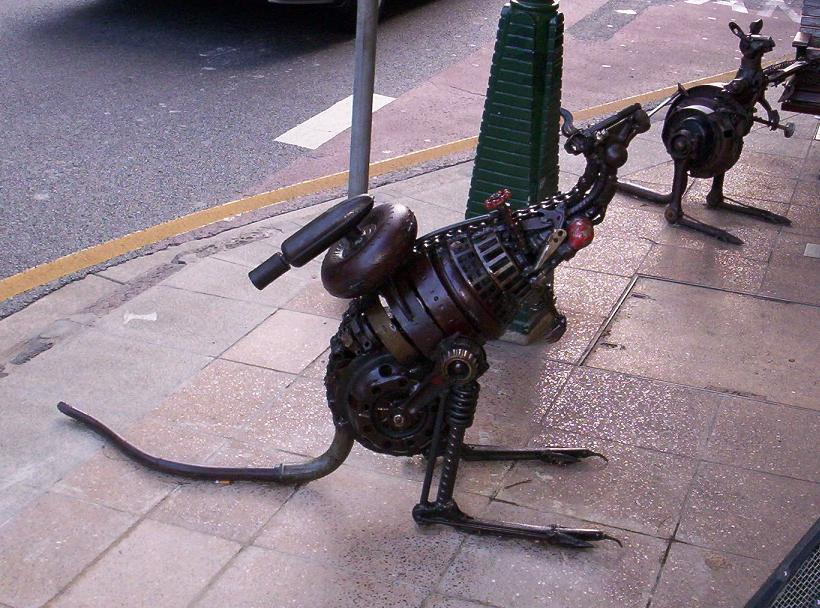

Christopher Trotter (born August 1967, in Brisbane, Queensland), is an Australian sculptor who makes sculptures from discarded scrap material.

Trotter, who graduated from the Queensland University of Technology in 1988, has been creating artworks for government, councils, universities and developers since 1994. His sculptures, each of which is unique, include the City Roos in George Street, Brisbane.

== See also ==
- List of public art in Brisbane
