= Graz (disambiguation) =

Graz is a city in Austria.

Graz may also refer to:

- Graz School, psychological school
- Graz University of Technology, the second largest university in Styria, Austria
- University of Graz, university located in Graz, Austria
- Graz Airport, airport in Austria
- Graz Entertainment, a North American licensing company
- GRaZ, or Ga'on Rabbi Zalman

== See also ==
- Graz'zt, sinister demon lord in the Dungeons & Dragons role-playing game
- Simmering-Graz-Pauker, one of the most important Austrian industrial conglomerates
- SK Sturm Graz, Austrian football club
