= Robert Graetz =

American activist

- Graetz in 2015
- Born: Robert Sylvester Graetz Jr. May 16, 1928; Clarksburg, West Virginia, U.S.
- Died: September 20, 2020 (aged 92); Montgomery, Alabama, U.S.
- Education: Capital University, Evangelical Lutheran Theological Seminary
- Occupations: Clergyman, activist
- Organization: Montgomery Improvement Association
- Movement: Civil Rights Movement
- Spouse: Jean Ellis (m. 1951)
- Children: 7

Robert Sylvester Graetz Jr. (May 16, 1928 – September 20, 2020) was a Lutheran clergyman who, as the white pastor of a black congregation in Montgomery, Alabama, openly supported the Montgomery bus boycott, a landmark event of the civil rights movement.

== Biography ==
Graetz, of German descent, was born in Clarksburg, West Virginia, and educated in Columbus, Ohio. His father was an engineer with the Libbey-Owens-Ford Co. At Capital University in Bexley, Ohio, from which he graduated in 1950, he started a "campus race relations club"; Walter White, the leader of the NAACP, was one of the club's speakers. Graetz received a B.D. in 1955 from Evangelical Lutheran Theological Seminary in Columbus, Ohio. He married Jean Ellis (known as Jeannie) on June 10, 1951, in East Springfield, Pennsylvania. They had seven children together.

In 1958, the family moved back to Columbus, where Graetz became the minister of another Black church. Over the years that followed, he worked in Ohio, Kentucky, California, and Washington DC, where he spent 13 years as a lobbyist for marginalized individuals.

In 2007, the Graetzes returned to Montgomery, Alabama, where they were actively involved in various civic activities including the diversity group One Montgomery and the League of Women Voters. Each year they hosted the annual Graetz Symposium at the National Center for the Study of Civil Rights and African-American Culture at Alabama State University. Graetz condemned the white nationalist violence in Charlottesville in 2017, saying "When have we had a more violent or more negative or more hateful presidency? Never in our history. And that’s being accepted now as (something) we’re proud of. Now that there’s no longer a criterion, even if it’s the worst of times, we’re setting a standard for all of us. Now, (it’s) no longer a standard based on God. Now, instead what we see is television channels that are based on who can tell the most lies the most effectively."

Graetz, who had Parkinson's disease and had been in hospice care for some time, died at his home in Montgomery on September 20, 2020.

=== Role in civil rights movement ===
Graetz's first full-time job as pastor was to a Black congregation, Trinity Evangelical Lutheran Church, in Montgomery. He began working there in 1953, the year of the Montgomery bus boycott. A personal friend of Rosa Parks, Graetz became secretary of the Montgomery Improvement Association, the organization founded to organize and support the boycott. The Sunday after Parks was arrested and the boycott began, he told his congregation, "Let’s try to make this boycott as effective as possible because it won’t be any boycott if half of us ride the buses and half don’t ride. So if we’re going to do it, let’s make a good job of it.” Graetz's support of the movement also included appearing at meetings led by Martin Luther King Jr.

While a few other whites in Montgomery supported the boycott, Graetz was the only white clergyman who did so. He and his family were ostracized by other whites and suffered several episodes of harassment: their tires were slashed, sugar was poured into the gas tank of their car, they received death threats, some of which were directed against their children, they were arrested, and bombs were planted at their home on three occasions; the largest, comprising 11 sticks of dynamite, did not explode.

Graetz wrote A White Preacher's Memoir: The Montgomery Bus Boycott (Black Belt Press, September 1999. ISBN 1-57966-015-0) about his experiences. The book They Walked to Freedom 1955–1956: The Story of the Montgomery Bus Boycott by Kenneth M. Hare (Sports Publishing LLC, 2005. ISBN 1-59670-010-6) contains a first-person account of his experiences as well as photographs of Graetz with King and others.

== Books and publications ==
- A Congregational Guide to Human Relations, 1964
- "An Informed Church Serves a Diverse Society", chapter in The Church in a Diverse Society, ed. L.W. Halvorson, Augsburg, 1964
- Monthly columnist for Columbus, Ohio, Diocese Catholic Times (1973–87)
- Montgomery – a White Preacher's Memoir, Chicago: Augsburg Fortress, 1991 (re-published as A White Preacher's Memoir: The Montgomery Bus Boycott. Black Belt Press, September 1999. ISBN 1-57966-015-0
- A White Preacher's Message on Race And Reconciliation: Based on His Experiences Beginning With the Montgomery Bus Boycott. Montgomery: New South Books, 2006. ISBN 1-58838-190-0

== Awards ==
- Russwurm Award, National Negro Newspaper Publishers Association, 1957
- Selma Humanitarian Award, from the producers and cast of the musical "Selma," about life and work of Martin Luther King Jr., 1976
- Distinguished Alumnus, Trinity Lutheran Seminary, 1986
- Doctor of Humanities, Capital University, 1990
- Ohio Humanitarian Award, 1993, in conjunction with Martin Luther King Day celebration
- (Ohio) Governor's Humanitarian Award, 1997, in conjunction with Martin Luther King Day celebration
