= Simon Perry =

- Born: 1962; London, England
- Education: Chelsea College of Art, Royal Academy, British School in Rome
- Known for: Sculpture
- Notable work: Public Purse; Threaded Field; Public Address
- Awards: Prix de Roma; The Melbourne Prize for Urban Sculpture

Simon Perry is a British/Australian sculptor and academic, based in Melbourne, Australia. Best known for his large-scale public art works for urban spaces in Australia and overseas, Perry's practice incorporates numerous sculptural techniques including casting, carving and fabrication. His works have been created in bronze, concrete, granite, steel, aluminium, wood and stone. Perry's commissioned pieces are predominantly site-specific, and often address elements of environment and public space with a gentle humour.

== Early life and education ==
From the age of seven Perry was regularly taken to the British Museum where he developed an interest in Assyrian and Egyptian sculpture; he cites the smoothness, monumental scale and coolness of the stone as having a profound effect on him.

Between 1981 and 1984 Perry studied at the Chelsea College of Art (now Chelsea College of Art and Design) where he received his Bachelor of Arts with Honours. From 1984 to 1987 he studied to receive his Master of Arts from the Royal Academy, where, in 1987, he won the Royal Academy Gold Medal for Sculpture. In 1987 he also won the prestigious British Prix de Rome for sculpture, a scholarship allowing him to study at the British School in Rome from 1987 to 1989.

== Career ==
In 1987 Perry's public art commission, Undercurrent, went on display at The Economist Building, London, also in 1987, Perry held his first solo exhibition at Nicola Jacobs Gallery in London.

Perry's major public commissions include Threaded Field, Docklands Stadium, Melbourne (1999–2000), On Tap, Caroline Springs, Melbourne (2007), and the much loved Public Purse (1994). He has also produced works in consultation with numerous municipal councils, corporations and architectural firms such as Habel Leonard Stent, Stockland Development, Edgewater, Seasons Apartments, and the RACV.

Simon Perry's Public Purse (1994) in the Bourke Street Mall, Melbourne.

In addition to his work in public spaces, Perry has shown work in galleries throughout his career, including solo exhibitions at the Nicola Jacobs Gallery, London (1988), The Linden Gallery, Melbourne (1993), The Mechanic's Institute, Melbourne (1998) and the Jenny Port Gallery, Melbourne (2010).

He currently lectures in Sculpture at RMIT University School of Art.

== Major works ==
Perry has received many public commissions both in Australia and abroad, and has stated: "I have been working in the public arena for a long time because it has interested me and allowed me to work on a scale and with budgets that would not have been possible in the gallery context."

=== Public Purse ===
Public Purse (right) is, for Australians at least, one of Perry's more recognisable works: located in the Bourke Street Mall, it functions as a unique, distinctive form of seating. The piece was commissioned by the council as part of their Percent For Art program in which one per cent of the council's budget was dedicated to funding public artworks with the goal of integrating art into the public spaces of the city. On the scheme Perry has said: "It's important to remember the 'per cent for art scheme' model represents a hard won victory and ensures there is a significant program of art in Australia."

He also comments on the competition for attention public art faces with regards to advertising: "Art in the public domain, and I am particularly referring to the city, is always competing with a whole range of things for our attention." Thus, the name Public Purse, is a reference to its commission from the Percent For Art Program, and is also a comment on the retail and department stores that populate the site.

=== Threaded Field ===
Part of Perry's Threaded Field (1999–2000).

Threaded Field (left) is a large-scale integrated sculptural installation located on the Northwest stadium concourse at Etihad Stadium, Melbourne. Appearing in a series of thread-like segments, loops, knots and needles, the sculpture works to stitch together the various parts of the stadium exterior and concourse. Inspired by the architecture of the stadium, the sculpture is made of painted and polished steel; it weathers graffiti, and use as a children's climbing apparatus, it also offers unorthodox seating. Perry, commenting on the "shelf life" of his work, has said: "the materials and processes I use are robust because it allows a work to survive within what can be a very hostile environment and be experienced first-hand by as many people as possible. There is something particular about physically experiencing an art work that can never be communicated through reproduction."

=== Public Address ===
A scaled-up megaphone made of fibreglass, steel and sound equipment, Public Address functions in much the same way as a hand-held megaphone, except that rather than emitting the sounds of protest rallies it projects the sound of snoring.

Perry's "Public Address" (2005) at its original site in Federation Square, Melbourne.

Public Address, Perry has said, functions as a reprise to his Public Purse (1994) insofar as megaphones are associated with political demonstration, authoritarian instruction and public oration; symbolically they represent a public object and, moreover, language and communication. The irregular breathing emanating from Public Address subverts these traditional notions of the megaphone and represents the voice of a public stupor preventing the vocalisation of objections to a world in crisis. The sound of snoring is indicative of the privacy of unconsciousness, but within the urban context, lying discarded in Federation Square, the giant megaphone appears both comical and pathetic informing to the malaise symptomatic of cultural and political fatigue. Indeed, during a large political rally at Federation Square about workplace agreements, Perry's megaphone had to be turned off so the snoring didn't disrupt the rally. Ironically, John Howard responded to the demands for workplace agreements by stating that he would not be influenced by megaphone politics.

Perry has observed that "[t]here are advantages and disadvantages to having a voice...if you have a voice you have a responsibility and a risk." In this way, Public Address, while dealing with notions of a public voice, also comments on the contested nature of public spaces. When Perry, an artist famous for his large-scale public art, elects to deal with anxieties about individuals expressing themselves as part of a collective in a public space he deliberately implicates himself in that confused nexus of being unable to express something terribly important. This self-consciousness and playfulness informs to a dynamic that is consistent with the vein of irony and scepticism that runs through much of his work.

== See also ==
- List of public art in Brisbane
