= Azienda Agricola Testamatta =

Italian winery

Coordinates: 43.7951028°N 11.3144078°E

Azienda Agricola Testamatta is an Italian winery run by Bibi Graetz, a winemaker of artist background from Italian/Norwegian heritage, who produces several Tuscan wines from vineyards located in the hills of Fiesole that overlook the city of Florence. Graetz has been described as a "cool winemaker" and "one of the rising young stars in Tuscany". The wines are all classified as Toscana IGT.

== History ==
Perhaps due to his partial Norwegian ancestry, his mother Sunniva Graetz née Rasmussen married to the Swiss-Israeli sculptor Gidon Graetz, Bibi Graetz and his wines have received a great deal of attention from Norwegian press since the first vintage of 2000. Originally an arts graduate from Academia dell'Arte in Firenze, Graetz began wine production in the late 90s after facing the decision to either allow old lease contracts of the old vineyards surrounding his home at the Castello de Vincigliata to expire, or to make use of them. In collaboration with the winemaker Alberto Antonini, with whom he worked for four years, the production became highly successful at an early stage. Graetz produces all label artwork himself.

Favourable scores from Robert Parker, and in particular a score of 98 for the Testamatta 2006 from Wine Spectator, was followed by a November 2008 press release declaration by the township of Fiesole, as the score was proclaimed to have "made Fiesole a full-fledged member on the map of the great wines of Italy and the world". Despite imprecise commentary that designates Graetz' wines as Super Tuscans, the wines are exclusively made from traditional Italian grapes, and receive moderate amounts of oak treatment.

Graetz' mid-range wine Soffocone di Vincigliata was banned from U.S. import due to regulations that permit no wine label to feature any type of sexual imagery. This did not come into effect until Graetz had made public the explanation that his Vincigliata vineyard is a favoured destination for local young lovers, and "soffocone" is a crude Firenze term for fellatio, at which point the figurative label depiction was seen in a new light. A revised label image was later permitted for U.S. import.

== Production ==
Graetz manages 80 hectares (200 acres) of vineyards, though of those he is himself the owner of 2 ha (4.9 acres).

Among the winery's bottlings are the flagship wine Testamatta, ("Hothead"), in recent years a 100% Sangiovese with an average production of 1,200 cases (110 hl; 2,900 US gal), the limited production cuvée Colore di Testamatta from three equal parts Sangiovese, Canaiolo and Colorino, with an average production of 75 cases (6.8 hl; 180 US gal) and Canaiolo di Testamatta from 100% Canaiolo, with a production of 150 cases (14 hl; 360 US gal).

Additionally the Soffocone di Vincigliata made from single-vineyard grapes with a blending proportion of 90% Sangiovese, 7% Colorino, 3% Canaiolo has an average production of 800 cases (72 hl; 1,900 US gal) and Grilli del Testamatta ("Hothead’s Whims"), 80% Sangiovese, 10% Colorino, 10% Canaiolo, with a production of 2,000 cases (180 hl; 4,800 US gal) function as second wines. The entry label Casamatta (literally casemate, commonly "crazy house") made from 100% Sangiovese sourced widely from Tuscany has a production of 12,500 cases (1,120 hl; 30,000 US gal) and is in some markets sold in bag-in-box.

The winery also produces white wines, among which are the Bugia ("lie") bianco and Cicala del Giglio from the Ansonica grape sourced from the island of Giglio, and Bianco di Casamatta, widely sourced from Tuscan Vermentino grapes.
