= Bree Warren =

Australian plus size fashion model

- Born: Bree Kimberley Warren; Brisbane, Australia
- Spouse: Mitch McCann
- Modeling information
- Height: 1.80 m (5 ft 11 in)
- Hair color: Brown
- Eye color: Brown
- Agency: IMG Models (Sydney); JAG Models (New York)

Bree Kimberley McCann (née Warren) is an Australian plus size fashion model.

== Career ==
Warren began modelling at age 23 after moving to New York City after university. Warren has modeled for brands such as ASOS, Ralph Lauren, Garnier, Revlon, Saks Fifth Avenue, Macy's, Seafolly, Nordstrom, Forever 21, and Tigerlily. She has been featured in Marie Claire, Elle, Vogue Australia, Grazia, Glamour, Cosmopolitan and on the front cover of Women's Health magazine in June 2018.

There has been controversy over whether it is accurate to label her "plus size".

She launched her swimwear label Code B in late 2019, which has a 8-20 size range. In 2020, she received a government exemption for a month's travel to America during the pandemic.

== Personal life ==
Warren is married to Mitch McCann, they live in Noosa, Australia.
