= Leonard and Kathleen Shillam =

Australian sculptors

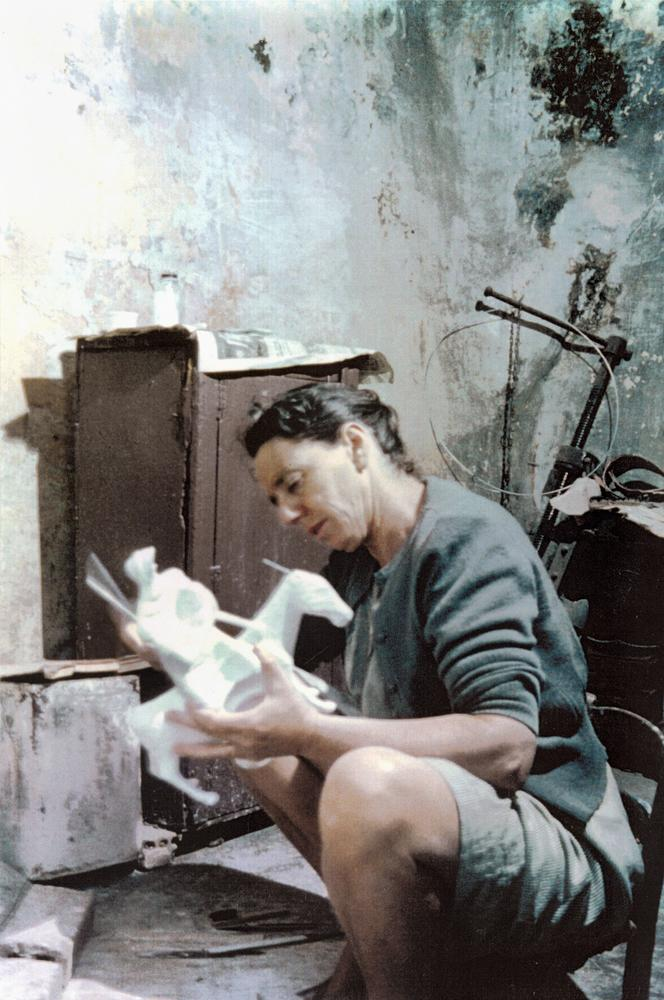
Kathleen Shillam in Plaka, Greece, 1961

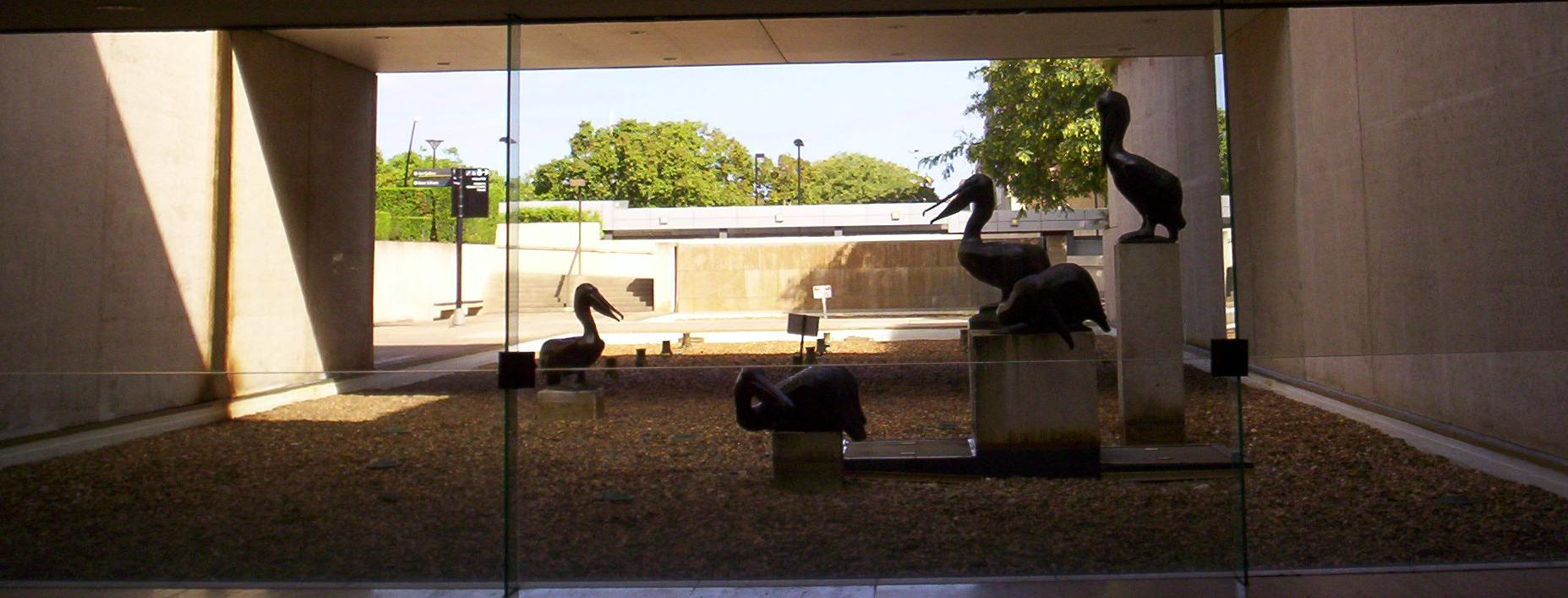
Leonard and Kathleen Shillam's Pelican sculptures at the Queensland Art Gallery. Photo taken from inside the Art Gallery

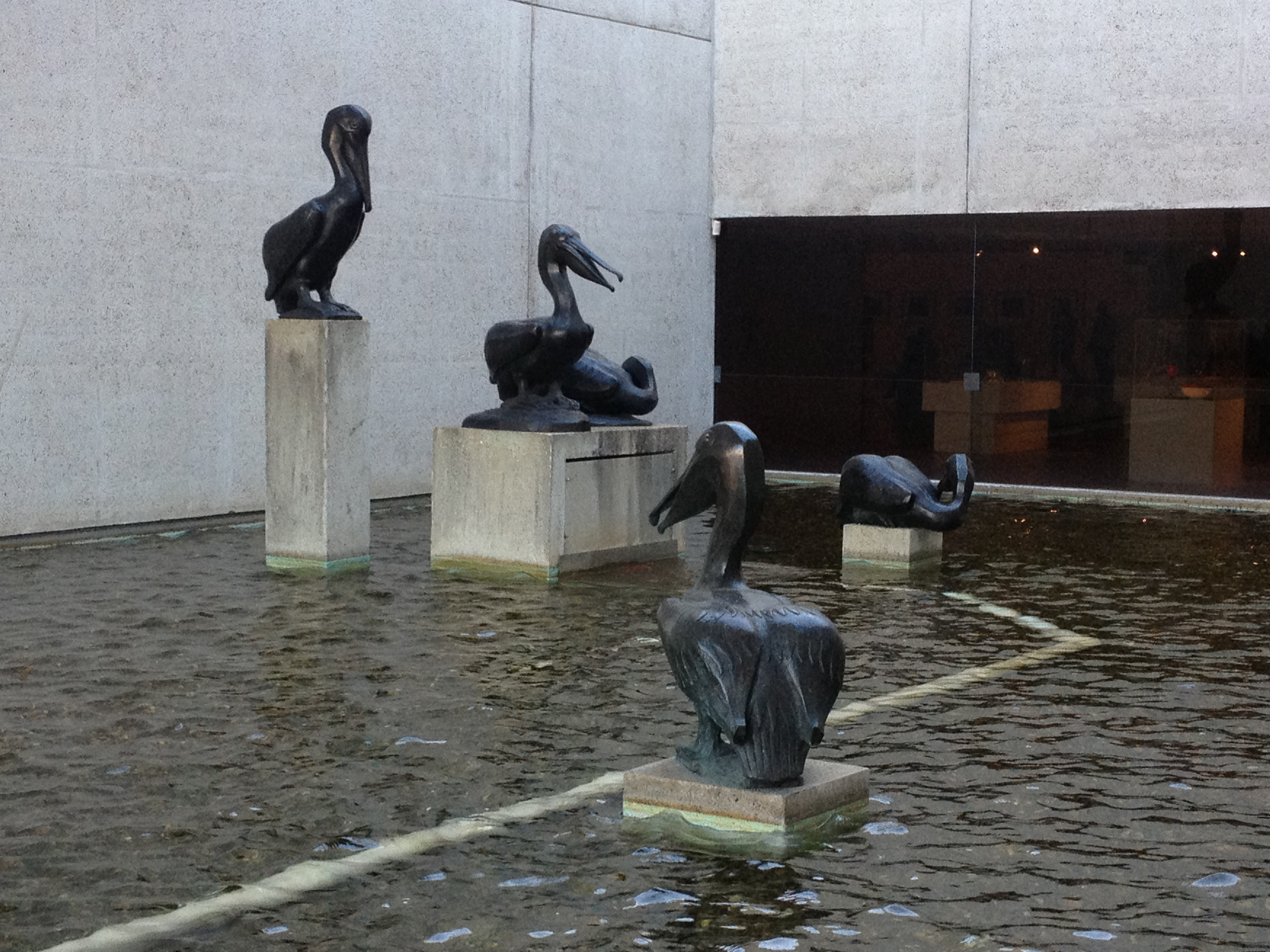
Pelican sculptures at the Queensland Art Gallery. Photo taken from outside the Art Gallery

Leonard and Kathleen Shillam were Australian sculptors, whose works are widely displayed in Queensland.

== Early life ==
Leonard George Shillam AM (born 15 August 1915 in Brisbane, Queensland - died 1 September 2005), was a founding member of both the Queensland Society of Sculptors and the Queensland Wildlife Artists Society. He attended Brisbane Grammar School (1928–30) and studied under Martyn Roberts at the Central Technical College, Brisbane (1931–33). He was awarded the Godfrey Rivers Medal in 1934. From 1934 to 1936 he was employed as a designer in a silk screen poster studio. In 1938 he received a Carnegie Institute Grant, which enabled him to study life modelling at the Westminster School, London. With the declaration of war (in 1939) he returned to Brisbane.

Kathleen Shillam (née O'Neill) AM (born 25 May 1916 in England - died 20 September 2002 in Australia). Kathleen was born at Paignton, Devon, arriving in Australia in 1927. She attended the Girls Grammar School, Brisbane (1930–31) and the Central Technical College, Brisbane (1932–33). She was awarded the Godfrey Rivers Medal in 1933. From 1934 to 1938 she was employed as a part-time commercial artist. In 1938 she moved to Sydney and spent much time in 1939 drawing animals at Sydney's Taronga Park Zoo. She returned to Brisbane in December 1939.

== Personal life ==
Leonard Shillam and Kathleen O'Neill met at the Central Technical College, Brisbane, in 1932. They first exhibited at the First Annual Exhibition of work executed by art students of the Central Technical College in November of that year. Along with Francis Lymburner and Will Smith, in 1935 they formed the nucleus of a small studio group to draw at the Victory Chambers, Adelaide Street, Brisbane.

In 1939, they both returned to Brisbane, and from 1941 to 1950 they earned a livelihood as poultry farmers.

They were married on 1 September 1942 at the Brisbane Registry Office.

In 1980, they set up a bronze casting foundry in their studio and until 1987 cast all their own smaller scaled works. On 21 March 1987 they were involved in a serious car accident that permanently affected the health of both.

== Seal sculpture ==
In 1956, Len Shillam was commissioned to create a water fountain feature for the pool of Lennon's Hotel at Broadbeach (the first large hotel on the Gold Coast). He created a life-size sculpture of a seal with its pup ('Seal and Pup') in polished terrazzo which became a local icon. After the demolition of the hotel in 1987, the sculpture was relocated to the nearby Sakura Japanese Gardens restaurant. It soon disappeared before being found at that bottom of a canal near the casino. After it was retrieved by Conrad Jupiters Casino and Bond University, it was restored and donated to the National Trust of Australia. In 2004, it was placed at the entrance of the Gold Coast Convention and Exhibition Centre, a short distance from the former Lennon's Hotel, where it remains today. Seal and Pup is listed on the Gold Coast Local Heritage Register.

== Awards ==
In 1976, they were awarded life membership of the Society of Sculptors, Queensland.

On 26 January 1986, they were appointed Members of the Order of Australia.

In December 2000, they were awarded Honorary Doctorates of Philosophy for services to the arts, notably sculpture, from the University of Queensland.
