= Heather Shimmen =

Australian artist (born 1957)

- Born: Heather Jane Shimmen; 8 November 1957 (age 68); Melbourne, Australia
- Education: RMIT University
- Known for: Painting, Printmaking, Etching
- Awards: 1998 Grand Prize, Silk Cut Acquistive Award for linoleum prints 2002 Toowoomba Biennale Art Award; 2003 Geelong Acquisitive Print Prize, Geelong Art Gallery

Heather Shimmen (born 8 November 1957) is a contemporary Australian visual artist whose paintings, prints and collages often use sinister historical imagery from 16th to 19th century.

== Biography ==
Shimmen was born in suburban Melbourne in 1957, and exhibited an early interest in drawing.

One pivotal life experience occurred when she was 14 and visited Papua New Guinea (PNG) with her family. Her parents had entered into a partnership in a farm 60 miles up the Markham Valley out of the town of Lae in the North West of PNG. She saw and met, for the first time, tribal people and saw first hand very confronting body piercing, tattooing and scarification.

She studied art at RMIT University, including a brief stint with printmaker George Baldessin. In 1978, she graduated with a Bachelor of Fine Arts and subsequently received two Australia Council grants. In 1998 she won the Silk Cut award for linoleum prints.

She has travelled throughout Australia (including Arnhem Land), and spent time in Berlin, London, and New York City.

In addition to her own art practice, she has worked as an artist-in-residence, lecturer or tutor at several institutions including RMIT. She has also been involved in the whimsical art collective Refluxus with Geraldine Burke.
She has been an artist in residence at the Art Vault Mildura, along with other artists such as Mike Parr, Tony Ameneiro, Rick Amor, G._W._Bot, Rona Green and Geoffrey Ricardo.
She currently lives in Melbourne with her spouse and daughter.

== Works ==
Shimmen's works display her fascination with sinister imagery from the 16th to 19th century: European poets; the aristocracy; tribal society and colonialism; nightmares; sin, disorder and decay.

Her linoleum prints, often based on old engravings, display a high degree of technical skill.

Her work is represented in many public, private, and corporate collections throughout Australia and internationally including the National Gallery of Australia, the Australian War Memorial, the National Museum of Australia, the State Library of Victoria, Artbank and the Art Gallery of South Australia.

== Awards ==
- 1998 Grand Prize, Silk Cut Acquistive Award for linoleum prints.
- 2002 Toowoomba Biennale Art Award
- 2003 Geelong Acquisitive Print Prize, Geelong Art Gallery
