= Maudie Palmer =

Australian curator, museum director, arts administrator

Maudie Palmer AO (died 3 December 2025), Australian curator, museum director, arts administrator, and environmental and cultural advocate, was a leading figure in the development of contemporary art institutions and regional cultural infrastructure in Australia from the late twentieth century into the early twenty-first century. She is particularly associated with the establishment and early direction of Heide Museum of Modern Art and TarraWarra Museum of Art, and with cross-disciplinary projects linking art, environment, and Indigenous heritage, especially along the Birrarung (Yarra River).

== Early life ==
Maudie Palmer grew up on a farm in south-west Gippsland, Victoria, an experience she cited in her 2021 Graduation Address at Monash University, as formative of her respect for Country, her environmental awareness, and commitment to cultural renewal in regional communities. In her professional life that background inspired her efforts to emphasise the relationship of art with landscape and community, and her sustained advocacy for projects that integrated cultural practice with environmental stewardship.

== Career ==
=== University Gallery, University of Melbourne (1975–1981) ===
Palmer began her professional career as assistant director/curator at the University Gallery, University of Melbourne (now the Potter Museum of Art), where she worked from 1975 to 1981. Part of her remit was its Grainger collection. During this period, she promoted living artists, and developed curatorial approaches that combined scholarly rigour with public engagement.

=== Heide Park and Art Gallery (1981–1996) ===
In 1981 Palmer was appointed founding director/curator of Heide Park and Art Gallery (now Heide Museum of Modern Art), a role she held until 1996, during which time she commissioned architect Andrew Andersons for the development of its main buildings. Heide achieved national significance as a centre for modern and contemporary Australian art. She secured major exhibitions in a rapidly-changing program of eight per year, including Sidney Nolan's Ned Kelly series for the opening of Heide II, and those of John Perceval, Guy Stuart, and David Nash; displayed works of Modernists collected by arts benefactors John and Sunday Reed who had founded Heide; showed new acquisitions; managed an invitation drawing prize; and commissioned curators for some unique offerings such as Caroline Williams' 33 men painters: (the male sensibility?) in 1986.

Palmer presented “Public Sculpture: Where It Belongs” for the 1988 Duldig Lecture in the Great Hall of the National Gallery of Victoria, a topic on which The Australian Jewish News regarded her as "well qualified," having "guided the development of one of Melbourne’s most outstanding public art galleries [Heide] and...instrumental in establishing its splendid sculpture garden." During her speech she made it clear that "her preference is for sculpture as a part of the larger natural environment, and in this she follows the philosophy of the late sculptor Karl Duldig (1902-86), in whose honour, together with his first wife, artist Slawa Duldig (nee Horowitz), the lecture is held." Palmer presented, or was interviewed, on art frequently on ABC radio.

On her departure from Heide, Palmer unveiled in March 1996 a $40,000 annual fellowship aimed at Australian mid-career artists funded by Tom Lowenstein of accounting and advisory firm Lowenstein, Sharp, Feiglin, Ades with painter John Olsen and Lowenstein, Warwick Reeder, the new director at Heide; John Olsen, artist; Dr Timothy Potts, Director of the National Gallery of Victoria as its trustees, chaired by Palmer. In August that year for its inauguration, shortlisted artists were Rick Amor, John Davis, Domenico de Clario, Dale Hickey, Hilarie Mais, Mike Parr, Rosslynd Piggott, Jan Senbergs, Imants Tillers, Aida Tomescu and Hossein Valamanesh, and the judge, Barry Pearce, head curator of Australian Art at the Art Gallery of New South Wales.

=== TarraWarra Museum of Art (1999–2009; 2011) ===
During the late 1990s Palmer was central to the establishment of TarraWarra Museum of Art in the Yarra Valley with its founders the philanthropists Eva Besen AO and Marc Besen AC who had been collecting Australian art since 1960s, she helped establish the not-for-profit museum as a charity, managed by an independent board. She collaborated in selecting architect Alan Powell from architecture firm Powell & Glenn, project-managed the construction, and oversaw the museum's first nine years of programming after its public opening in 2003, including the 2005 exhibition 'discovering' George Baldessin.

Palmer was instrumental in building the museum's permanent collection, extending and contextualising the Besens’ founding gift and initiating the acquisition of First Peoples’ art for the collection. In 2006 she founded the TarraWarra Biennial, which developed into a nationally significant contemporary art exhibition series.

Notable exhibitions curated or co-curated by Palmer at TarraWarra include Echo (2004, with Diane Morgan); John Young: A Survey of Works 1979–2005 (2006); Charles Anderson: A House for Hermes #01 – The House of My Father (2007); John Nixon (2007); and Danie Mellor: Exotic Lies, Sacred Ties (2014). She filled an interim director role in 2011 and advised the Board until 2025.

=== Curator ===
Palmer emphasised the social and environmental responsibilities of cultural institutions. She championed living artists, prioritised the amplification of First Nations voices, and sought to embed museums within their communities and landscapes. A close collaborator with Senior Wurundjeri Elder Aunty Joy Murphy Wandin AO, she worked to ensure Indigenous histories and perspectives were integral to cultural programming.

== Consultancy ==
From 1996, Palmer worked as an art consultant across Australia, contributing to the planning and delivery of major cultural and civic projects. She consulted on initiatives including the Moët & Chandon Australian Art Foundation (1996–2001); the New Commonwealth Law Courts, Melbourne (1999); the Parks Victoria Yarra Valley Artists in Residence Program; and the Melbourne Festival Visual Arts Program (1997–1999), for which she was appointed as curator of the program, included such innovative performance works as Jill Orr's Myer Windows, and as reported brought:

...new life to the 1998 festival...establish[ing] the visual arts as a key feature within it, [with the] group exhibition Remanence, a major display of Bill Viola's video installation The Messenger, a public lecture series and associated exhibitions program, [her] visual arts program brought together a diverse array of exhibitions and events at venues across Melbourne during October. Remanence was the key feature in the program. Curated by Palmer and comprising works by 14 leading Australian and international artists, the exhibition was situated in the former Melbourne Magistrates’ Court and City Watch House.

For the 1999 Festival, she, with Bryony Marks, reintroduced sculpture installations on Herring Island Environmental Sculpture Park. She served as art consultant for AAMI Stadium and the Barak Bridge. With Graeme Base, John Clarke, Morris Gleitzman, Michael Kieran Harvey, and Arnold Zable was judge of the 2002 Daffodil Day Arts Awards for adults and children. In 2010 she presented among Robyn Archer, Barbara Campbell, Bonita Ely, Brenda Croft, Juliana Engberg, Glenn Barkley, Stelarc in the Australian Experimental Art Foundation conference (to) give time to time at the Mildura Palmpsest.

Prof. Leon Van Schaik AO, LFAIA, RIBA regards Palmer as a gallery director who has had a major impact on the development of [Melbourne's] architectural culture, starting when as Director of Heidi she was hampered in...

...the procurement process for the gallery extension...by the belief of the board that there were no architects capable of designing a gallery in Melbourne—the common perception among the commissioning class in the city in the 1980s. Moved by the criticism that the indifferent result attracted, Maudie acted purposively to support the patronage of innovative architecture. She convened a small committee [including Daniel Besen and Van Schaik] and drafted the brief that persuaded the state government to run an international competition for Federation Square. The lan Potter Centre at Federation Square now accommodates the NGV's Australian Collection—arguably one of the most important new architectural housings of art anywhere.

In 2014 she was part of the Simon McArthur & Associates team responsible for feasibility and development planning for the new Shepparton Art Museum, the Warrnambool Art Gallery Business Case, and the St Arnaud Precinct Plan for the Shire of Northern Grampians. In 2017 she acted as strategic manager at McClelland Sculpture Park and Gallery, initiating the design and construction of the Sarah & Baillieu Myer Education Pavilion with architect Kerstin Thompson. In 2019 she undertook similar strategic and curatorial programming work at Hamilton Art Gallery.

== Academic and cross-disciplinary projects ==
When appointed Vice-Chancellor's Professorial Fellow at Monash University, she established the Birrarung Project, a cross-faculty collaboration involving researchers in Indigenous heritage and history, art and architecture, and environmental sustainability, culminating in December 2016 with a collaboration with Monash Art Projects on Birrarung: Art Water Refuge Tumbleweed, to make the film Birrarung, documenting the Yarra River from its mythological and physical source, to the Bay. Other outcomes were the 2017 Birrarung Art Water Refuge Standing Wave project with artist James Geurts and establishment of the Bulleen Birrarung Cultural Precinct from which, with curators Stacie Piper and Eugene Howard, realised the Birrarung Cultural Pathway: A Journey into Landscape and Imagination.

=== Governance ===
- 2001–2009: Trustee of the National Gallery of Victoria
- Member of the Yarra River Keepers’ Association Committee
- Founding Ambassador of CLIMARTE (Artists for Climate Action)
- Monash University Museum of Art Committee.

== Impact ==
On receiving her Honorary Doctorate in 2022 from Monash University, Palmer identified three defining themes of her career: embracing change, connecting artists with communities, and the urgent need to care for the land through creative practice and cultural leadership. Her unrealised vision included the planting of a thousand Indigenous trees along the Birrarung in collaboration with Wurundjeri artists and curators as part of a cultural pathway.

Palmer was also recognised as a mentor to emerging curators and museum directors, particularly women in the arts sector. Colleagues noted her distinctive contribution as a writer on art, praised for articulating both the integrity and the poetic dimensions of contemporary practice.

== Publications ==
- Palmer, Maudie; Leveson, Sandra (1977). Sandra Leveson survey exhibition 1967-77. Melbourne: University of Melbourne University Gallery. OCLC 215112692.
- Palmer, Maudie; Print Council of Australia (1978). Prints and drawings : John Dent, Fraser Fair, Rafael Gurvich, Michel Kemp, Greg Moncrieff, Peter Rosman, John Scurry, Fran van Riemsdyk. Melbourne: University Gallery, University of Melbourne.
- Palmer, Maudie, ed. (1981). Heide Park and Art Gallery. Includes articles by Norman Wettenhall, Richard Haese, Barrett Reid. Supplementary catalogue (4 p.) included. Melbourne, Australia: Heide Park Art Gallery. ISBN 978-0-9593823-0-3.
- Palmer, Maudie; Stuart, Guy (1982). Guy Stuart: a brief retrospective, 10 June - 25 July 1982. Bulleen, VIC: Heide Park and Art Gallery.
- Palmer, Maudie (1984). 100 works on paper from the Heide Collection. Bulleen, Vic.: Heide Park and Art Gallery.
- Palmer, Maudie (1985). David Nash: Elm wattle gum, Spring 1985. Bulleen: Heide Park and Art Gallery. ISBN 9780959382396.
- Palmer, Maudie (1986). "Australian sculpture now : the Second Australian Sculpture Triennial". Art + Australia.
- Palmer, Maudie (1987). Selected contemporary drawings : an invitation prize: 31 October-13 December 1987. Bulleen [Vic.]: Heide Park and Art Gallery.
- Palmer, Maudie (May 1990). "Clifford Last: a revelation of 'ideas'". Art Monthly Australia (6). ISSN 1033-4025.
- Palmer, Maudie; Green, Chrles; Reeder, Warwick (1996). Rites for an anxious spring: selected acquisitions 1981-1995 (Exhibition catalogue of Exhibition held at Museum of Modern Art at Heide, 27 August–29 September 1996 ed.). Bulleen, Vic.: Museum of Modern Art at Heide. ISBN 9780947104344.
- Palmer, Maudie (1997). Moet & Chandon Australian Art Foundation : celebration of a decade and 1997 touring exhibition. Box Hill, Vic.: Moet & Chandon Australian Art Foundation.
- Palmer, Maudie; Palmer, Alice; Palmer, Alice Dene, eds. (1998). Remanence: Marina Abramovic, Gordon Bennett, Daniel Buren. Melbourne: Melbourne International Festival of the Arts Ltd. ISBN 978-0-646-36317-2.
- Palmer, Maudie; Gollings, John; Marks, Bryony (1999). Herring Island : environmental sculpture park. RMIT University. ISBN 9780864590275.
- Palmer, Maudie (2000). Mitchell McAuley crossings: 25th October - 19th November 2000, Dickerson Gallery. Woollahra, N.S.W.: Dickerson Gallery.
- Palmer, Maudie; Pound, Patrick; Green, Charles; Brown, Lyndell (2002). Sanctuary. Richmond, Vic. ISBN 9780958047708.
- Palmer, Maudie; Marks, Bryony (2003). TarraWarra Museum of Art. Healesville, Vic.: TarraWarra Museum of Art. ISBN 9780975172605.
- Palmer, Maudie; Kohen, Apolline; Stanhope, Zara (2008). Mythology & reality : contemporary Aboriginal art from the Gabrielle Pizzi Collection: Tarrawarra Museum of Art 23 November 2008-15 March 2009. Healesville, Vic.: TarraWarra Museum of Art & Gallery Gabrielle Pizzi.
- Heathcote, Christopher; McCaughey, Patrick; Thomas, Sarah; Palmer, Maudie (2008). Encounters with Australian modern art. South Yarra, Vic: Macmillan Publishers. ISBN 978-1-921394-21-8.
- MvS Architects; Palmer, Maudie; SGS Economics & Planning (2016). Halls Gap Master-Plan for Commercial Investment and Public Land Development: Northern Grampians. Stawell, Victoria: Northern Grampians Shire Council.

== Awards ==
Maudie Palmer was awarded Officer (AO) in the General Division of the Order of Australia in the 2006 Queen's Birthday Honours, for "service to the community through activities fostering greater public knowledge and understanding of contemporary art and artists, and in curatorial and advisory roles related to work on collections of national significance." In 2011 she was made an Honorary Fellow of Monash University and received the Rotary Club of Melbourne Vocational Service Award.

== Personal life ==
Palmer was the mother of two daughters, yet she maintained close personal and professional relationships across the Australian arts community, which she regarded as integral to her work as a cultural advocate and institution builder. When Maudie died on 3 December 2025, tributes from cultural institutions and colleagues praised her as a trailblazer in Australian museum leadership, noted her generosity as a mentor, and credited her with an enduring impact on the integration of art, environment, and Indigenous cultural recognition within public institutions.
