= Geoffrey Ricardo =

Australian contemporary visual artist (born 1964)

- Born: Geoffrey Ricardo; 1964 (age 61–62); Melbourne, Australia
- Education: Chisholm Institute of Technology, Post Graduate and Masters of Fine Art in printmaking at Monash University
- Known for: Drawing, Printmaking, Etching, Lithography
- Awards: 2009 Grand Prize, Lorne Sculpture Exhibition; 2013 King Valley Art prize
- Website: www.geoffreyricardo.com

Geoffrey Ricardo (born 1964) is an Australian contemporary visual artist whose work focuses on his sculpture and printmaking practice.

== Biography ==
Ricardo was born in Melbourne, Australia. He is known for his Figurative work that centres around a narrative language, Ricardo works primarily in sculpture, printmaking, etching, lithography, & painting. Ricardo was the winner of the 2009 Lorne Sculpture Exhibition. He has been a regular artist in residence at the Art Vault Mildura, along with other artists such as Mike Parr, Rick Amor, Rona Green, Tony Ameneiro and Heather Shimmen. His work is represented in select major private and corporate collections, as well as public and university museum collections in all states of Australia including the National Gallery of Australia, Art Gallery of New South Wales, Queensland Art Gallery, State Library of Victoria and the Art Gallery of South Australia.
