= Tony Ameneiro =

Australian contemporary visual artist

- Born: 1959 (age 66–67); London, England
- Education: Alexander Mackie College of Advanced Education
- Known for: Drawing, printmaking, etching, lithography
- Awards: 2007 Grand Prize, Fremantle Print Award; 2004 Toowoomba Biennale Acquisitive Art Award; 2009 Geelong Acquisitive Print Prize, Geelong Art Gallery
- Website: tonyameneiro.com

Tony Ameneiro (born 1959) is an Australian contemporary visual artist whose work focuses around his drawing and printmaking practice.

== Biography ==
Ameneiro was born in London in 1959 to Spanish parents and emigrated to Australia in 1968. He studied at the Alexander Mackie College of Advanced Education 1979–1981. During his time at art school, he met Graeme Synold and together they formed the Post-punk group, Tablewaiters in 1980. With Ameneiro on synthesiser and Synold on lead vocals, they were soon joined by other band members. As a member of Tablewaiters, Ameneiro provided the cover artwork for their single, "Scattered Visions" (1984)

Known for his figurative work that often centres around references to art history, botany and landscape, Ameneiro works primarily in printmaking, etching, lithography, monotyping, painting, drawing.

In 2021 the book "Tony Ameneiro - Flowers Skulls & Heads" was published.

His studio is based in Moss Vale New South Wales, Australia.

== Awards ==
Ameneiro was the winner of the 2007 Fremantle Print Award. More recently Ameneiro was the winner of the 2022 Swan Hill Print & Drawing Acquisitive (Print Award) He has been twice selected as commissioned print-artist for the Print Council of Australia. He has also been a three-time finalist in the Dobell Prize in 2003 2006 and 2012.

== Collections ==
His work is represented in select major private and corporate collections, as well as public and university museum collections nationally and internationally including the British Museum, National Museum Cardiff (Wales, U.K.) , National Gallery of Australia, Art Gallery of New South Wales, Queensland Art Gallery, State Library of Victoria and the Art Gallery of South Australia . Illustrated essays, articles and reviews on his work have been published in selected Australian newspapers and recognized art press including The Australian, Art Monthly Australia, Print Council of Australia's (PCA) quarterly journal IMPRINT Periphery and Artlink Magazine.
He was a regular artist in residence at the Art Vault Mildura, (now closed) along with other artists such as Geoffrey Ricardo Mike Parr and Rick Amor.

== Custom Printing ==
His studio has editioned prints for various Australian artists including the 2011 Archibald Prize winning artist Ben Quilty and the 2011 Dobell Prize winner Anne Judell. The etchings made for Ben Quilty, by Ameneiro in 2017 and 2018 formed the exhibition "The Accident" shown at the Jan Murphy Gallery, Fortitude Valley, 19 Feb 2019–16 Mar 2019. Amongst these etchings several have been acquired by the AGNSW including Liesa, Endone, Tenderness, The fall, Man cave, Chaos of men, Lloydy, Kenny, Eric, Last Supper. Also from the AGSA collection printed in 2011; Self portrait (as Cook...), and Self portrait (as Cook with sunglasses)

In 2000 Ameneiro was also in involved in editioning the lino-cuts prints as part of Ngukurr Prints for the University of Wollongong, in collaboration with Basil Hall and Sue Blanchfield. An exhibition of these prints formed part of the show at the University of Wollongong in 2002. A folio containing these works is held at the NGA.
