= John Zerunge Young =

Hong Kong-born Australian artist

John Zerunge Young AM (Chinese: 楊子榮 born 1956) is a Hong Kong-born Australian artist.

== Early life and education ==
Born in Hong Kong in 1956, John Zerunge Young moved to Australia as a child in 1967 during China's Cultural Revolution.

Young first studied Russian Impressionism at the Julian Ashton Art School, then, after declining a scholarship to study painting at the National Art School in Sydney, studied Philosophy of Science and Aesthetics at the University of Sydney, earning a First Class Honours degree for his thesis on Wittgenstein and Aesthetics. He then studied sculpture and painting at Sydney College of the Arts with postmodernist artist Imants Tillers and avant-garde composer and musician David Ahern.

== Career ==
In the early 1980s he moved to Europe, living in London and Paris (at the Cité internationale des arts) for a couple of years after being awarded the Power Foundation Scholarship from Sydney University. Upon his return to Australia, Young lectured at Sydney College of the Arts, University of Sydney from 1983 to 1994.

Young's first solo exhibition was a one-minute show held in a hamlet in the fishing village of Rosroe, Connemara, on the west coast of Ireland, in 1982. Three series of painting followed: the Silhouette Paintings, the Polychrome Paintings and the Double Ground Paintings.

He played an important role as a founding member in 1996 of the Asian Australian Artists' Association (Gallery 4A), now the 4A Centre for Contemporary Asian Art, Sydney, a gallery and centre for the advocacy of Asian Australian and Asian contemporary art.

He moved to Melbourne in 1997.

In 2009, Young re-joined the board of the 4A Centre, but as of 2021 is no longer a member of the board.

== Themes ==
Young has produced series of abstract paintings which deal with concerns around technology and the body: Naïve and Sentimental Paintings, The Day After Tomorrow and Spectrumfigures. After 2008, his projects started focusing on transcultural humanitarianism, including Bonhoeffer in Harlem (Berlin, 2009), Safety Zone (Melbourne, 2010; Brisbane, 2011).

== Recognition ==
Young was awarded the Australia Council for the Arts' Visual Arts Craft Board (VACB) Artist’s Residency in 1998, to travel to Tokyo, and its Visual Arts Fellowship for established artists in 2012, undertaking a project on the history of the Chinese diaspora in Australia.

In the 2020 Australia Day Honours Young was appointed a Member of the Order of Australia (AM) for his "significant service to the visual arts, and as a role model".

== Personal life ==
Young resides in Melbourne with his partner and two children as of 2021.

== Selected exhibitions ==
Young has been the subject of three survey exhibitions: Orient/Occident: John Young, 1978-2005 held at the TarraWarra Museum of Art, Victoria, in 2005-2006; The Bridge and the Fruit Tree at ANU's Drill Hall Gallery, Canberra in 2013; and The Lives of Celestials: John Young Zerunge at Town Hall Gallery, Boroondara, Melbourne in 2019.

- 1982 The Second Mirage, Rosroe, Connemara, Ireland
- 1995 Antipodean Currents, The Solomon R. Guggenheim Museum, New York; The John F. Kennedy Centre, Washington DC, curated by Julia Robinson
- 1995 Transcultural Painting, Ian Potter Museum of Art, The University of Melbourne, Taichung Museum of Art, Taichung; Tamsui Centre for Art and Culture, Taipei, Hong Kong Visual Arts Centre, Hong Kong, Guangzhou Institute of Fine Arts, Guangzhou; Song He Tan Gallery, Beijing, curated by Francis Lindsay and Merryn Gates
- 1996 Systems End, Oxy Gallery, Osaka; Hakone Open Air Museum, Hakone; Dong An Gallery, Seoul; Kaoshung Museum of Art, Kaoshiung, curated by William Wright and Takeshi Kanazawa
- 2005-2006 Orient/Occident: John Young – a survey of works, 1978-2005, TarraWarra Museum of Art, Victoria, curated by Maudie Palmer
- 2009 Bonhoeffer in Harlem, Installation at St. Matthaus Church, Berlin (in conjunction with Alexander Ochs Galleries, Berlin/Beijing)
- 2010-2011 Safety Zone, Anna Schwartz Gallery, Melbourne; University of Queensland Art Museum, Brisbane
- 2013 The Bridge and the Fruit Tree: John Young - A Survey, ANU Drill Hall Gallery, Canberra
- 2016 The repetition of the good. The repetition of the bad, Alexander Ochs Gallery, New Synagogue, Berlin - Centrum Judaicum
- 2017 Macau Days, Migration Museum, Adelaide
- 2018 The Burrangong Affray, 4A Centre for Contemporary Asian Art, Sydney
- 2019 The Lives of Celestials: John Young Zerunge, Town Hall Gallery, Boroondara, Melbourne

== Commissions ==
Young has been commissioned for numerous significant national and international public projects, including:

- 2013-15 Open Monument, a permanent monument recording the contribution of the Chinese population in Ballarat, City of Ballarat, Victoria
- 2010-2011 Finding Kenneth Myer, Tapestry commissioned by Lady Southey and the Myer Family (produced with the Australian Tapestry Workshop for the National Library of Australia)
- 2005 Open World, Tapestry commissioned by the Victorian State Government for Jiangsu Province, China to mark the occasion of the 25th anniversary of the sister city relationship between Nanjing and Melbourne (produced with the Victorian Tapestry Workshop for Nanjing Library, Nanjing)
- 2001 Interchange, Mass Transit Railway, Hong Kong

== Publications ==
- John Young, Carolyn Barnes & William Wright, John Young, Craftsman House, Thames & Hudsons, Australia, 2005
- Alexander Ochs, Christhard-Georg Neubert, Kevin Rudd, Sylvia Volz, Wolfgang Huber, John Young / Bonhoeffer in Harlem, Edition St. Matthäus-Kirche Berlin, 2009
- John Clark & Pamela Kember, John Young: Three Propositions, Prüss & Ochs Gallery, Berlin, 2003
- Brian Castro & M.A. Greenstein, John Young: Pine's Edge, Black Inc., Melbourne, 2001
- Graham Coulter-Smith, Christina Davidson & Graham Forsyth, with a foreword by Leon Parossian, John Young: Silhouettes and Polychromes, Schwartz City Publications, Melbourne, 1993
- Peter Hutchings & John Clark, with foreword by Frances Lindsay and an introduction by Melissa Chiu, John Young: The Double Ground Paintings, Australian Art Promotions, Sydney, 1995
- John Young & Terry Blake, 'On Some Alternatives to the Code in the Age of Hyperreality, the Hermit and the City Dweller', Art & Text #2, Winter issue, 1981
