= Justine Varga =

Australian artist

- Education: National Art School, Sydney
- Known for: Photography
- Notable work: Desklamp (2011–12); Maternal Line (2017); Photogenic Drawing (2018)
- Awards: Josephine Ulrick & Win Shubert Foundation for the Arts Photography Award (2013 and 2016); Olive Cotton Award for Photographic Portraiture (2017); 21st Dobell Drawing Prize (2019)

Justine Varga (born 1984) is an artist based in Sydney, and Oxford, United Kingdom. She is known for her interrogation of the photographic medium. Varga's approach is exemplified by her award-winning portrait Maternal Line, one of several awards the artist has received for her photography.

== Career ==
Varga graduated with honours from the National Art School, Sydney in 2007. Shortly thereafter, her photography entered the collection of the Art Gallery of New South Wales in 2009. Her work was selected for significant emerging talent awards and survey exhibitions including: the 2011 Helen Lempriere Travelling Art Scholarship Exhibition, Artspace, Sydney (2011); and the 21st Primavera: Young Australian Artists, Museum of Contemporary Art Australia, Sydney (2012). Varga's photographs were included in Flatlands: Photography and Everyday Space, Art Gallery of New South Wales, Sydney (2012–13), with her first international exhibition being in held in Aotearoa New Zealand in 2013.

Since that time, her work has frequently been exhibited in important museum exhibitions: Australian Art: Now at the National Gallery of Australia, Canberra (2015); Paris Photo, Grand Palais, Paris, France (2015); Emanations: The Art of the Cameraless Photograph, Govett-Brewster Art Gallery, New Plymouth, Aotearoa New Zealand (2016); New Matter: Recent Forms of Photography, Art Gallery of New South Wales (2016–17); TarraWarra Biennial 2018: From Will to Form, TarraWarra Museum of Art, Victoria, Australia (2018); Performing Drawing, National Gallery of Australia (2018–19); Ways of Seeing, Art Gallery of South Australia, Adelaide, South Australia (2019); Defining Space/Place: Australian Contemporary Photography, Museum of Photographic Arts, San Diego, US (2019); News from the Sun, City Gallery Wellington, Aotearoa New Zealand (2019–20); Direct Contact: Cameraless Photography Now, Sidney and Lois Eskenazi Museum of Art, Indiana University, US (2023); Bright Sparks, The Treasury, Bodleian Library, Oxford University, United Kingdom (2023).

Varga was interviewed in her London studio for the feature documentary Making a Mark, which premiered at the Adelaide Film Festival in 2017.

In 2018, she co-curated Runes: Photography and Decipherment, Centre for Contemporary Photography, Melbourne. In that same year, she completed a major commission for Duo Central Park, Sydney, a building designed by Foster + Partners in London.

Her work has been discussed in histories of photography, including Installation View: Photography Exhibitions in Australia (1848–2020) (Perimeter Editions, 2021), and Negative/Positive: A History of Photography (Routledge, 2021).

== Maternal Line ==
In 2017, Varga was awarded the biannual Olive Cotton Award for Photographic Portraiture for Maternal Line, a portrait the artist made of and with her grandmother. Varga asked her Hungarian grandmother to inscribe herself onto a sheet of film negative using her pens and saliva, then printed from that negative in the darkroom to make the awarded photograph. A furore developed online and in the national press within Australia and internationally. This was largely due to there being no camera used in its production, nor did it show a face. It was the first time a contemporary Australian photograph was on the front page of one of the major print newspapers since an exhibition of Bill Henson’s work was shut down by police in 2008.

In response to the outcry, the award's judge, Shaune Lakin, Senior Curator of Photography at the National Gallery of Australia said, "In spite of the fact photographic history is lined with examples of nonrepresentational portraits and self-portraits, there remains an expectation that photography’s primary function is to witness the world and that a photographic portrait should show what its subject looked like." And, "To argue that photography requires a camera is to assert a very partial or selective view of the medium’s history of the photograph..."

He described the experience of standing in front of Maternal Line, "It was a moving, melancholic experience: to witness a moment of significant emotional and cultural exchange between two women at such different points in their lives; to be left with a strong feeling for the subject’s personality and – to quote Olive Cotton’s daughter Sally McInerney – her soul... In the end, Maternal Line called itself out as the award’s most ambitious portrait".

== Awards ==
- Australia Council for the Arts London Studio Residency (2014).
- Museum of Contemporary Art Australia’s Primavera Veolia Acquisitive Prize (2014).
- Josephine Ulrick & Win Shubert Foundation for the Arts Photography Award (2013 and 2016).
- Acme International Residency Programme (2017).
- Olive Cotton Award for Photographic Portraiture (2017).
- 21st Dobell Drawing Prize (2019).

== Collections ==
- Artbank
- Art Gallery of New South Wales
- Art Gallery of South Australia
- Macquarie University
- Museum of Australian Photography
- National Art School
- National Gallery of Australia
- University of Queensland
