= Fremantle Print Award =

Australian art award for print media, est. 1976

The Fremantle Print Award is Australia's longest-running, most prestigious and largest printmaking award, and is awarded by the Fremantle Arts Centre, who also acquire the winning work. The award was established in 1976 with the support of Shell Australia. This partnership continued until 2006.

With acquisitive and non-acquisitive awards the prize money totals A$22,000 as of 2021, with $16,000 for the first place, and $6,000 for second. The awards were put on hiatus for 2020, due to COVID-19. Beginning in 2022, the awards will be held every two years.

Several noted Australian artists have been recipients of the award including David Rose in 1978 and Mike Parr in 1990.

Selected past winners include:

- 1976 Ray Beattie
- 1977 Jock Clutterbuck
- 1978 David Rose
- 1979 Basil Hadley
- 1980 Jörg Schmeisser joint with Rod Ewins
- 1981 Paul King joint with Richard Hook
- 1982 Ray Arnold joint with Tony Pankiw
- 1983 Keith Cowlam joint with Michael Taylor
- 1984 Stewart Merrett joint with Monica Schmid
- 1985 Alun Leach-Jones
- 1986 John Spooner joint with Ruth Johnstone
- 1987 Karen Turnbull joint with Margaret Sulikowski
- 1988 Daniel Moynihan joint with Ron McBurnie
- 1989 Helen Ling joint with Megan Russell
- 1990 Mike Parr
- 1991 Jock Clutterbuck joint with Jodi Heffernan
- 1992 Heather Hesterman
- 1993 Bevan Honey joint with Sally Morgan
- 1994 Dean Bowen
- 1995 Jan Davis
- 1996 Paul Brown
- 1997 Pat Brassington,
- 1998 Kathy Barber
- 1999 Raymond Arnold
- 2000 Bede Tungatalum joint winner with Chips Mackinolty, Therese Ritchie
- 2001 Marion Manifold
- 2001 Alick Tipoti, Non-Acquisitive Prize
- 2002 Poppy van Oorde-Grainger
- 2003 Antonietta Covino-Beehre
- 2004 Peter Burgess
- 2006 Neil Emmerson
- 2007 Tony Ameneiro
- 2008 Alick Tipoti, Non-Acquisitive Prize
- 2010 Rebecca Beardmore
- 2011 Peter Burgess
- 2012 Lucas Ihlein & Ian Milliss
- 2013 Alex Maciver
- 2014 Gosia Wlodarczak
- 2015 Fiona MacDonald, Narelle Jubelin, Maria Madeira and Victor De Sousa
- 2016 Sam Bloor
- 2017 Evan Pank
- 2018 Deanna Hitti
- 2019 Rew Hanks
- 2021 Alison Kennedy, 2nd prize John Prince Siddon
- 2023 Jacky Cheng
- 2025 Prita Tina Yeganeh
