= Aida Tomescu =

Romanian-born Australian contemporary artist

- Born: 3 October 1955 (age 71); Bucharest, Romania
- Known for: Painting, drawing, contemporary art
- Awards: 2003 Dobell Prize for Drawing; 2001 Wynne Prize; 1996 Sir John Sulman Prize
- Website: Aida Tomescu

Aida Tomescu (born October 1955) is an Australian contemporary artist who is known for her abstract paintings, collages, drawings and prints. Tomescu is a winner of the Dobell Prize for Drawing, the Wynne Prize for Landscape and the Sir John Sulman Prize, by the Art Gallery of New South Wales.

== Early life and education ==
Tomescu was born in October 1955 in Bucharest, Romania where she lived until age 23. She arrived in Australia one year later, in May 1980. She studied at the Institute of Fine Arts in Bucharest in the early 1970s. The Institute in Bucharest provided its students with academic training focusing on the structure, composition, and overall approach to making works (Hart, 2006, 10). In 1977 she graduated with a diploma in painting and two years later she had her first solo exhibition. In 1983 she completed a post-graduate diploma in visual arts at the City Art Institute in Sydney.

The seed of her career as a painter became planted in Aida Tomescu while studying at the Institute of Fine Arts in Bucharest in the late 1970's, when she closely studied the work of Cezanne and his legacy through cubism. She read Kandinsky's famous essay, 'Concerning the spiritual in art' ... When she emigrated to Australia from Romania and took up study at the City Art Institute in Sydney in 1980 she was ripe for a dedication to abstract painting from which she never wavered (Barry Pearce ' 100 moments of Australian painting' 2014, page 216).

== Career ==
Tomescu's work gradually evolved towards abstraction. Tomescu said: "One of the first things that happened here is that I bought bigger canvases, I increased the scale. Though I was continuing as a painter, I needed a whole new vocabulary, and this would only develop gradually." Tomescu's works are influenced by a variety of sources. For example, in an interview with Tomescu in February 2020, Angela Goddard wrote that Tomescu's "in depth knowledge and intimate study of art history- she explores the way Proto and Early Renaissance Italian artists, Giotto and Fra Angelico, through to Renaissance painters Piero della Francesca, Giovanni Bellini and Titan construct their paintings and the rich content of their work" as influential on Tomescu's painting (Goddard, February, 2020). Her work has also been informed by Paul Cézanne and cubism, and the ideas of Wassily Kandinsky expressed in his 1910 book Concerning the Spiritual in Art.

In 1986 Tomescu was invited to the Victorian Print Workshop, now the Australian Print Workshop. As an artist who regarded drawing as an important part of her practice, she found the experience of working with etching plates liberating as she had to "curb any craving for precision and for controlling an image". At the same time, Tomescu "loved its transformative powers over my drawing, the way in which it liberated my drawing in the acid tray. Materiality was removed entirely by the acid, so I was left with an image that is really vulnerable, open."

Tomescu is represented by Flowers Gallery and Jensen Gallery.

== Exhibitions ==
Tomescu held her first exhibition "based on still-life" in 1979, in Bucharest. She has exhibited regularly in Australia and internationally, with over 30 solo exhibitions to date.

From 1985 to 1995, she was exhibiting at the Coventry Gallery, Sydney with "regular solo shows of her dark abstract paintings".

In 1987 Tomescu exhibited in Canberra at the Ben Grady Gallery. Sasha Grishin, senior art critic for The Canberra Times found her work to be in "a bit of a time warp" back to a time when abstract expressionism was the "dominant style" and the challenge for the artist would be, after "redisovering" abstract expressionism, to "build on it and create their own unique style".

In 1991, a smaller version of the Art Gallery of New South Wales touring exhibition Abstraction was shown at the Nolan Gallery, Lanyon ACT. Art critic Sonia Barron, writing for The Canberra Times, was disappointed in the exhibition but found at least that Tomescu communicated "a spiritual anxiety in her dark expressionist canvases".

In 1994, the art collector and art gallery owner Chandler Coventry showed a collection of 300 prints he had acquired in the exhibition Obsession. The diverse collection of works included 10 works by Aida Tomescu and art critic Sasha Grishin remarked that her work "places her as one of the leading exponents of gestural abstraction in this country".

In 2009 her work was the subject of a major survey exhibition, Aida Tomescu: Paintings and Drawings at the Drill Hall Gallery, Australian National University. Art critic John McDonald expressed admiration for Tomescu's "sense of colour and surface texture". He referred to the paint being laid on in "concrete-like slabs" with the works on paper consisting of a "frenzied mass of squiggles and disjointed calligraphy" and found the body of work "alive and convincing".

Tomescu's graphic works were included in the major survey of prints and drawings Out of Australia at the British Museum, London in 2011.

Tomescu's work was included in a major touring exhibition, Abstraction: Celebrating Australian Women Abstract Artists, a touring exhibition (2017–2019) from the National Gallery of Australia.

Other exhibitions include The Triumph of Modernism at TarraWarra Museum of Art, Art Basel Hong Kong (2019, 2018, 2017 & 2015), Wet, Wet, Wet, Fox Jensen McCrory Auckland (2019) The Anatomy of Gesture, Fox Jensen McCrory Auckland (2017); Chromoffection, Fox Jensen McCrory Auckland (2016), 'The Heide Collection’, Heide Museum of Modern Art (2015); Vibrant Matter, TarraWarra Museum of Art (2013), The Mind’s Eye, Art Gallery of South Australia (2013), Forever Young, Heide Museum of Modern Art (2011), and Contemporary Encounters, Ian Potter Centre: National Gallery of Victoria (2010).

== Critical reception ==
Australian art historian Patrick McCaughey writes of Tomescu in his 2014 book Strange Country: Why Australian Painting Matters:

[One] of the best painters at work in Australia today, Aida Tomescu has revived a full-throated painterly abstraction, where colour and gesture flow through the work...she knits over and under surfaces in which the light and colour seem to be pulsing from within the work, not just laid on top. You feel her presence and her sensibility, moment to moment on the surface, in the painting.

Art critic for The Sydney Morning Herald John McDonald wrote on August 25, 2012:

Aida Tomescu, who is consolidating a reputation as one of Australia's most formidable living abstract painters...is making the point that she is not interested in arbitrary "mark-making" — she is after something she calls an "image". Even though most people might associate this word with a recognisable object, Tomescu's image is very different. It seems closer to the image of Christ or the Virgin in Byzantine art, which was meant to embody the presence of the holy being in the work.

Christopher Allen in Art in Australia from Colonization to Postmodernism wrote:

"Aida Tomescu’s paintings…draws us into the intense concentration of its own making…(she) starts with energy and movement and seems to be trying to do the near-impossible — to reach stillness from such a starting-point."

== Awards and commissions ==
- Sir John Sulman Prize, 1996 (Grey to Grey)
- The Wynne Prize, 2001
- The Dobell Prize for Drawing, 2003
- Winner of the inaugural LFSA Arts 21 Fellowship at the Heide Museum of Modern Art, 1996, Melbourne
- Victorian Print Workshop residency, Myer Art Foundation, 1986

== Collections ==
- National Gallery of Australia (71 works, including but not limited to, "Seria Unu I-IV" 1993, Ithaca II 1999, Alba II 2002, and "Phosphor II" 2005, A long line in the sand III 2021) and Ithaca V 1997)
- National Gallery of Victoria (9 works, including but not limited to, Oz and Seria Unu III)
- Art Gallery of New South Wales (27 works, including Neagru I(1991), Seria Unu I-IV(1993), Grey to Grey(1995), Ithaca I-X(1997),Seria Neagra I-IV(1999), Patru II (1999), Marea Neagra (2002), Negru I, III, IV (2002), Aqua Alta (2008), and Sewn onto Stones in the Sky (2019) )
- Auckland Art Gallery, New Zealand (Zattere/Margharita)
- British Museum, London (11 works, including Ithaca I- X (1997) and Untitled (1988) )
- QAGOMA (2 works, Semn 1990, and Vis 1, Vis 2, Vis 3)
- Art Gallery of South Australia
