= Richard Cornish =

Australian art historian

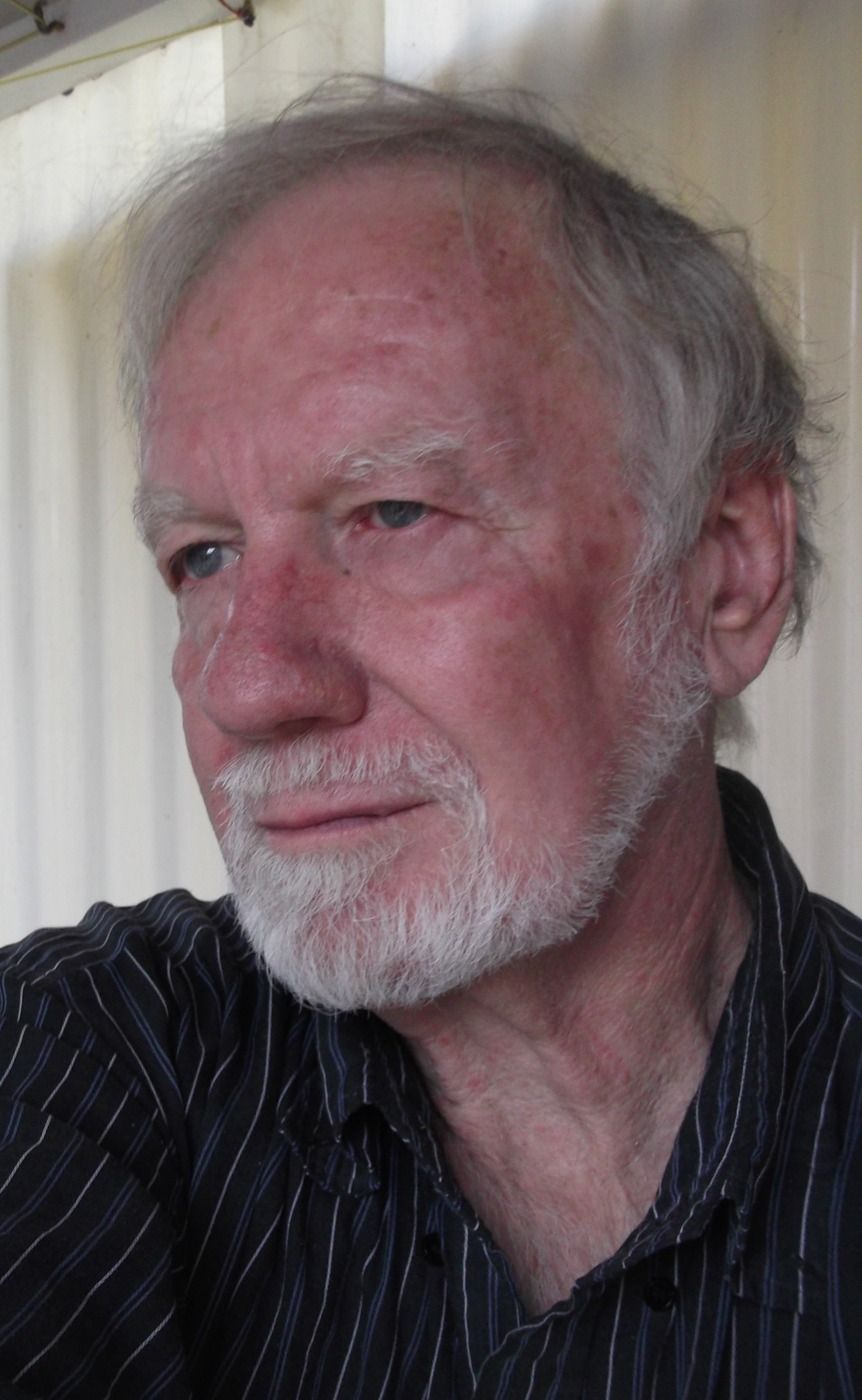
Richard Cornish

Richard R Cornish (born 1942) is an Australian art theoretician and practitioner. He is an artist, writer, poet, teacher and left-wing political activist. He has won many prizes for his art and draughtsmanship and was a student at the National Art School.

His art works span the period from 1955 until today showing the influence of modernism, Mexican social realism and Asian multiculturalism. His artwork and writing covers themes such as the protest against the Vietnam War, the emergence of the women's liberation movement, questions of social injustice, economic crisis and ecology. Cornish has had nine solo Exhibitions and 30 group exhibitions and illustrated for the national folk magazine Stringy Bark and Greenhide, worked as graphic designer, designed book and record covers, created set designs for stage productions and worked in fabric printing. Cornish was asked to submit visual images for the Sydney Olympics with 12 other Australian artists.

Recently, Richard has finished several written texts on China A novel about a travel /adventure to a wedding in China in Harbin. He had also written an art and cultural text titled ‘When Worlds Collapse’ on how artistic culture experiences extreme alienation during crisis such as occurred in the 16thC Italy. He has finished a manuscript on ‘On Artistic and Cultural Creativity and its Counter Worlds’ and how it all works in the arts throughout history. He has started a three volume Memoir of his own life and the people and events that he has experienced in his life. His own artistic production has increased and is concerned with militant multiculturalism and artistic universality and the possibilities of a new Marxist based humanism.

== Publications ==
=== Art novels ===
- The Woman Lilith
- The Seven Remonstrations of the Chinese Jester Dong–Fang Shuo

=== Plays ===
- The Girls in Our Town
- The Jester of Ch’u is a radio play that was written for ABC's Ian Reid Competition,
- Coriolanus and Co Go Wacko

=== Published poetry ===
- Upon Tiananmen Square Poem in World Anthology ‘Earth Against Heaven' Five Islands Press, 1990
- ‘A Small Feat Cooked for my New Lover’ Suzhou, China, June 1993
- ‘Beloved Ilsa’
- ‘The Liquid Mirror’
- Green Apples of Ornans, 1991
- ‘An Australian Artist Confronts Chinese Ghosts’ Poems–Seven Sardonic Senryu's Chiaroscuro, May 1987
- A Suite of Haiku Poems, June 1987

== Art exhibitions ==
=== Solo exhibitions ===
- Cell Block Theatre, National Art School, East Sydney 1967
- Against the Wind-One Blade of Grass’ Oct 1969
- Retrospective ‘Ricordanza’ exhibition Flinders University S.A. 1980
- ‘Cornish and Marko Koludrovic’, Tamworth March/April 1990
- ‘Across Cultural Lines; Towards New Identities ’ Multicultural Exhibition,

=== Group exhibitions ===
- ‘Modern Art’ selected works from Sydney's Public Schools, Inner Sydney 1955. Organised by Ken Reinhardt and Keith Molde
- Students Exhibition 1965, Newcastle School of Art and Design
- NTC student show, City Art Gallery
- 1966 Mattara Art Exhibition, Civic Park, Newcastle 1965/66, NSW 1964/65
- May Day Art Exhibitions,
- The Realist Group Art Exhibition, (touring Australia) Newcastle City Art Gallery, Newcastle, June 1968 Perth Prize for Drawing Perth, WA 1969 National Art School, End of the Year show-East Sydney 1966/67, National Art School,
- Travelling Scholarship (Won by Brett Whiteley) Art Gallery of NSW 1966 Le Gay Breton Prize for Painting,
- Ashfield Art Prize, Ashfield 1967/67.
- Artist for Labour,
- Art Sale for ALP Von Bertough's Art Gallery, Cooks Hill, Newcastle 1975 7th
- Collector Choice Art Exhibitions, Von Bertough Art Gallery, Newcastle 1977, 78, 79
- Sulman Prize Art Gallery of NSW 1975 Newcastle May Day Prize for Political Cartoons, Newcastle Workers Club 1983/4
- Little Treasures, Big Pleasures, 1991/2
- Expression Session,
- Jacaranda Acquisitive Drawing Award, Grafton Regional Gallery, 1996
- Living treasures Art Exhibition.
- Portraits of Senator Ian Cohen 1999/2000, School of Arts Art Gallery Nimbin.

=== Private collections ===
Locations

- Australia
- Israel
- India
- Russia
- Denmark
- Great Britain
- Canberra War Museum, Canberra, Protest Paintings Against Vietnam War
- Flinders University Art Collection, South Australia
- Drawings in the National Art School Collection
