= Eleanor Lilian Gladys Gough =

Australian dressmaker

Eleanor Gough
- Born: Eleanor Lilian Gladys Gough; 21 February 1887; Bathurst
- Died: August 10, 1967 (aged 80); Mosman
- Predecessor: Mary Ellen Roberts

Eleanor Lilian Gladys Gough (February 21, 1887 – August 10, 1967) was an Australian teacher of dressmaking. She was the lecturer in charge of women's handicrafts courses shortly after they were based at the old Darlinghurst Gaol in 1925. She led the handicrafts department for 26 years at what is now called the National Art School.

== Early life ==
Gough was born in 1887 in Bathurst, New South Wales. She was the second eldest of six children born to Amy Margaretta (born Riley) and her husband Henry Alexander Gough. Both of her parents had been born in Australia and her father supported the local courts as a sheriff's officer. It is presumed that she was taught dress making at a local college before she began teaching at Gresford and Paterson. In 1913 she was employed by Sydney Technical College as an assistant teacher of dress and hatmaking. By 1918 there were over 600 students on these courses.

== Head of department ==
Sydney Technical College moved its art department in 1922 and the women's handicraft courses, which were led by Mary Ellen Roberts, were transferred in 1923 to the old Darlinghurst Gaol. Roberts died in the following year and she was replaced in 1925 by Gough. Gough graduated the same year with a Bachelor of Education after four years study with the University of Sydney.

Gough became the president of the Technical College Vocations Club and under her leadership a cafe opened in 1927. The Vocations Club also created a store, a reading group and a library. The job continued to expand as correspondence course students joined both classes at the college and several classes in the country. In 1930 there were nearly 2,500 students under her department's charge.

In 1934 Gough's book, Processes in Dressmaking, was published.

Gough's second textbook, Principles of Garment Cutting, was published in 1940. She was not paid as much as other (male) lecturers who had smaller responsibilities. She led the department through the war and when the Commonwealth Reconstruction Training Scheme was available to men and women returning from service in the war and to war-widows. Men were paid roughly £4 a week to train and women received just over half that sum.

== Retirement ==
She retired in 1951 after 26 years of service. The 600 students her predecessor had supervised in 1919 had grown by 1951 to 10,778 students.

In 1957 the Miss E. L. Gough scholarships were created. Gough died in the Sydney suburb of Mosman in 1967.
