= Dobell Drawing Prize =

Australian art award

The Dobell Drawing Prize is a biennial drawing prize and exhibition, held by the National Art School in association with the Sir William Dobell Art Foundation.The prize is an open call to all artists and aims to explore the enduring importance of drawing and the breadth and dynamism of contemporary approaches to drawing.

== About ==
Australian painter William Dobell, New South Wales, c. 1950

The Dobell Drawing Prize is one of the highest value prizes for drawing in Australia. The prize had previously been held in conjunction with the Archibald Prize, Sulman Prize, and Wynne Prize at the Art Gallery of NSW. The Dobell Drawing Prize, now held at the National Art School, runs in alternative years to the Dobell Australian Drawing Biennial at the Art Gallery of New South Wales.

The prize was initiated by the Trustees of the Sir William Dobell Art Foundation. In 2003, the prize money was $20,000. This was increased to $25,000 in 2009 and increased again to $30,000 (AUD) in 2019 when the Prize was relocated to The National Art School.

The exhibition showcases the finalists’ artworks across a broad range of media that acknowledges the foundational principles of drawing, while also encouraging challenging and expansive approaches to drawing.

The new Dobell Drawing Prize is an acquisitive art award that runs in alternative years to the Dobell Australian Drawing Biennial at the Art Gallery of New South Wales, affirming the Dobell Foundation’s commitment to continuing the development of drawing as a medium in its own right, and a fundamental element of the visual arts.

== The Sir William Dobell Art Foundation ==
The Sir William Dobell Art Foundation was formed in 1971 according to instructions in the artist’s will which stated that “a Foundation be established for the benefit and promotion of art in NSW”. Funds for the Foundation were raised through the sale of property and art works in William Dobell’s estate.

An initial sum of approximately $260,000 was invested and since its establishment the Foundation has contributed in excess of $6 million towards activities in many areas of the arts.

The first public venture of the Foundation was to commission John Olsen to design a large mural for the harbour-side Northern Foyer of the newly opened Sydney Opera House. The mural was based on the poem “Five Bells” by Kenneth Slessor.

Other major contributions include:

- The donation of over 1000 sketches and drawings by William Dobell to the Art Gallery of New South Wales (AGNSW)
- The commission of a panoramic mural by John Olsen for the new Sydney Opera House
- The commission and fabrication of a major public sculpture for Martin Place by Bert Flugelman and the donation of the work to the City of Sydney
- The funding of the annual Dobell Drawing Prize acquisitive award ($25,000) at the Art Gallery of NSW with the winning work donated to the AGNSW collection. The Prize had a different guest judge each year. The twentieth anniversary was celebrated in 2013 with a touring exhibition of all 20 prize winners to regional galleries in NSW and the ACT along with the production of a special catalogue containing the history of the Prize and its over 700 participating artists.
- Founding patron of the Australian Centre for Photography, and financial support of the acquisition of Dobell House by the ACP.
- Support of the Gunnery Art Centre studios, Woolloomooloo, for artists in residence at Artspace and establishment of the Dobell Studio for visiting artists.
- Creation of the Dobell Chair in Art History at the Australian National University, Canberra
- Refurbishment and presentation of the Dobell Room at the New England Museum and Art Gallery in Armidale
- Founding sponsor of Art Express, the annual exhibition of outstanding work from the HSC Visual Arts examination.
- Funding of the annual Dobell School of Drawing at the National Art School, Sydney, for 75 Year 11 students from regional NSW.
- Support for education programs for regional NSW visual arts teachers to enhance their skills and to create special professional development opportunities in non-metropolitan areas.
- An international lecture series in art and art history and the support of art scholarship

The Dobell Prize is an acquisitive award, with the gallery keeping past winners in the permanent collection. There were 685 entrants in the first year of the prize, in 1993, of which only 34 were exhibited, and there were similar numbers in following years.

At the presentation of the 2012 Dobell Drawing Prize it was announced the prize would close as an open entry drawing prize, to be replaced by a curated biennial drawing show/award to be named the Dobell Australian Drawing Biennial

== List of winners ==
- 1993 – Kevin Connor – Pyrmont and the city
- 1994 – Thomas Spence – The roofs of Oxford Street (Taylor Square)
- 1995 – Jan Senbergs – Kitchen at Smacka's
- 1996 – Pam Hallandal – Self portrait
- 1997 – Peter Bonner – Interior
- 1998 – Godwin Bradbeer – Man of paper VII
- 1999 – David Fairbairn (artist) – Portrait of Tao Triebels
- 2000 – Nick Mourtzakis – Untitled study
- 2001 – Nicholas Harding – Eddy Avenue (3)
- 2002 – Mary Tonkin – Rocky outcrop, Werribee Gorge
- 2003 – Aida Tomescu – "Negru III and Negru IV" (A candle in a dark room)
- 2004 – Garry Shead – Colloquy with John Keats (diptych)
- 2005 – Kevin Connor – Le Grand Palais, Clémenceau, de Gaulle and me
- 2006 – Nick Mourtzakis – nature. insects plants flowers. shell fish corals. the microscopic creatures. dreams
- 2007 – Ann Pollak – Mullet Creek
- Grayson, Virginia (2008). "No Conclusions Drawn". ABC. Archived from the original on 4 September 2008.
- 2009 – Pam Hallandal – Tsunami
- 2010 – Suzanne Archer – Derangement
- 2011 – Anne Judell – Breath
- 2012 – Gareth Sansom – Made in Wadeye
- 2019 – Justine Varga – Photogenic drawing
- 2021 – Euan Macleod – Borderlands – Between NSW and QLD
- 2023 – Jane Grealy – Maria’s Garden, Scheme C

== Additional works acquired ==
The Dobell Trustees occasionally buy some of the works which have not won the main prize but have been exhibited, or they acquire them for other reasons, such as:

- Colin Lanceley's The garden between the mountains and the sea 1992 (bought)
- Daniel Moynihan's Tasmanian tiger in Paris, Canal St. Martin 1992 (bought)
- Dog by Rachel Ellis in 1992, which was admired by Arthur Boyd was bought by finalist Peter Kingston and donated to the gallery.
- Margaret Woodward's In the penumbra of perfumes and songs, 1993, a gift of Dr Roderick Bain.
- A gouache, Man on the beach, by Joe Furlonger, 1993
- David Brian Wilson's The woman 1996 (bought)
- Judy Cassab donated two of her drawings, which were exhibited as finalists in 1997 Transparent landscape, Rainbow Valley and 2002 Temple, Udaipur. Another entry of hers, Incredible lightness, Rainbow Vallery, 1998, was purchased in 1999.
- In 2000, the Art Gallery Society supported the purchase of drawings Visibility/Invisibility by Jennifer Keeler-Milne and Urban landscape II by Sallie Moffat. Anne Judell's Mute 1999 was gifted to the gallery by an anonymous donor.
- Margaret Olley, the judge in 2001, purchased two drawings. One by Margaret Woodward, Francisco Lezcano riding the unicycle, and one by Amanda Robins, Linen dress, and gave them to the gallery.
