= Tablewaiters =

- Graeme Synold (centre), Tony Ameneiro (right) and Ian Robertson (background) performing at the Trade Union Club in Sydney, 1982

Background information
- Origin: Sydney, New South Wales, Australia
- Genres: Post-punk, new wave, pub rock
- Years active: 1980-1986
- Label: Powderworks
- Past members: Tony Ameneiro; Graeme Synold; Gye Bennetts; Ed Lee; Ian Robertson; Phillip Hyrwka

Tablewaiters were an Australian post-punk band active from 1980 to 1986. They were founded by Tony Ameneiro on synthesiser and Graeme Synold on lead vocals; by 1981 they included Gye Bennetts on drums, Ian Robertson on bass guitar, and Ed Lee on lead guitar. By 1984 they were joined by Phillip Hyrwka who replaced Bennetts on drums. After Tablewaiters' disbandment Ameneiro pursued a career in visual arts. Tablewaiters had undertaken various national tours and supported both national and international artists: Simple Minds, The Psychedelic Furs, Split Enz, INXS, Midnight Oil, Machinations, Laughing Clowns, Models, Hunters & Collectors, Eurogliders, and The Birthday Party.

== History ==
The founding members, Graeme Synold and Tony Ameneiro, met in Sydney in 1980 while studying art at the Alexander Mackie College of Advanced Education. One of the band's first appearances was as a support act to Sardine v at the Civic Hotel in Sydney in 1980. Various line up changes settled down in 1981 with Gye Bennetts on drums (ex-The Agents), Ian Robertson on bass guitar and Ed Lee on guitar, along with Ameneiro on synthesiser and Synold on lead vocals.

The line up of Ameneiro, Bennetts, Lee, Robertson, and Synold recorded material for an album, Gate, with Lobby Loyde in 1981 at the Alberts recording studio in Sydney. The album was never released because of financial problems. Various bootleg copies were in existence from the master tapes, though they are of poor quality as the recordings had not reached the mixing stage. The intended single, "Between the Lines", and "Access", was never released. There were also a previous series of recordings with Colin Newham of The Reels.

Tablewaiters were managed by SCAM (suss city artist management), which also looked after Sardine v, The Sunnyboys, Machinations and Local Product. Loyde also produced material by other SCAM artists including: The Sunnyboys (extended play, December 1980), Machinations (November 1981) and Sardine v's single, "Sabotage".

Bennetts left Tablewaiters after the Gate recordings and was replaced by Phillip Hyrwka on drums. Hyrwka was previously drummer for Agents, the same band which had Bennetts earlier. Rob Barnham became Tablewaiters' regular manager. A publishing deal was signed and in 1984 they recorded and released a double A-sided 7" single, "Scattered Visions"/"Small Quiet Children", through Powderworks Records & Tapes. The cover artwork for the single was by Ameneiro.

With the pub rock scene in its heyday, Tablewaiters performed several nights a week, both in support spots and as a headline act. Being Sydney-based they were regulars at The Civic Hotel, The Trade Union Club, Governor’s Pleasure at the Rocks, as well as at many suburban venues. In Melbourne, they had several residencies at Macy’s in Toorak. Several tours and important support spots included playing with Simple Minds, The Psychedelic Furs, Split Enz, INXS, Midnight Oil, Machinations, Laughing Clowns, Models, Hunters and Collectors, Eurogliders, and The Birthday Party.

After some more self-funded studio recording the band broke up in 1986. After Tablewaiters' disbandment Ameneiro pursued a career in visual arts. Ed Lee moved to Wollongong, where he has been in several bands there including ATE. In 1992 Ed Lee and Tony Ameneiro recorded and released a self-funded, self-titled album under the name Chihuahua Chihuahua. Bennetts was later a member of various bands including Johnny Kannis Band (1988), Roddy Radalj and The Surfin' Caesars (1989), Hitmen D.T.K. (1989–90), The Psychotic Turnbuckles, and Klondike's North 40.

== Discography ==
=== Singles ===
Some of the early work was produced by Colin (Polly) Newham and Lobby Loyde.

- "Between the Lines" / "Access by Invitation" - Alberts (November 1981)
- "Scattered Visions" / "Small Quiet Children" - Powderworks Records (POW 0227) (1984)

=== Compilations ===
- "Confrontation with a Mountain", on Fast Forward cassette magazine, volume 11, produced by Lobby Loyde.
