= James McQueen (writer) =

Australian novelist, short story writer, and environmental activist

- James McQueen in 1958
- Born: James Stuart McQueen; 5 August 1934; Ulverstone, Tasmania, Australia
- Died: 19 December 1998 (aged 64)
- Occupations: Novelist short story writer non-fiction writer environmental activist
- Spouse(s): Rosemary (first), Barbara (second)
- Children: 2
- Writing career
- Language: English
- Notable works: Hook's Mountain; The Heavy Knife

James Stuart McQueen (5 August 1934 – 19 December 1998) was an Australian novelist, short story writer, and environmental activist. His work is noted for its powerful, often confronting, portrayals of the Tasmanian landscape and its inhabitants, exploring themes of masculinity, violence, and nature conservation. An outspoken advocate for the environment, his activism, particularly his involvement in the Franklin Dam protests, significantly influenced his writing.

== Early life ==
Born in Ulverstone, Tasmania, McQueen worked in a wide range of occupations before dedicating himself to literature. He pursued studies at the National Art School in Sydney and later completed a four-year accountancy course. He and his first wife, Rosemary, had two children.

== Writing career and activism ==
McQueen began writing fiction seriously in 1975 and committed to it as a full-time profession in 1977. He and his second wife, Barbara, settled in Nabowla, near Scottsdale in north-eastern Tasmania. There, they cultivated orchids (Orchidaceae) professionally, a passion that led to their co-authoring two books on the subject.

McQueen was a prolific author. He published over 150 short stories in Australian and international journals, which were later gathered in six collections. He also wrote five novels for adults, several works of children's and young adult fiction, and multiple non-fiction books.

A defining aspect of McQueen's later life was his environmental activism. In the early 1980s, he was arrested during protests against the proposed dam on the Franklin River. This experience directly influenced his work, notably the novel Hook’s Mountain (1982), and his non-fiction book The Franklin: Not Just a River (1983). In a frank 1990 interview with Island magazine, he also discussed his personal struggles with alcoholism, but remained a lifelong resident of Tasmania, a setting that dominated his literary imagination.

== Themes and style ==
McQueen's fiction is greatly centred on the Tasmanian wilderness, which routinely serves as both a setting and a central force, or presence, in his narratives. His concern with ecological preservation is a dominant theme in his later works, and his writing often features vivid, unsentimental descriptions of the natural world. His direct involvement in the Franklin Dam protests is fictionalised in his novel Hook’s Mountain, which depicts a community's resistance to a similar project.

Masculinity is another central preoccupation, with his stories frequently examining how men navigate expectations of strength, stoicism, and aggression in rural and conflict-driven environments. His later works, particularly the unfinished trilogy titled The Clocks of Death, began to explore morality and violence in more philosophical terms.

Australian literary critic Laurie Clancy praised McQueen's short fiction, stating that "the best of his short stories are very fine". However, Clancy suggested his novels were less successful, noting "McQueen's limitations tend to be exposed more in the novels, with their formulaic characterizations". Nevertheless, his work is widely recognised for its authentic voice, moral seriousness, and intense evocation of place.

== Notable works ==
=== Novels ===
- A Just Equinox (1980) – An artist reflects on formative life experiences, exploring themes of memory and identity.
- Hook's Mountain (1982) – A powerful environmental allegory in which characters fight to save a wild Tasmanian river from being dammed.
- The Floor of Heaven (1986) – Follows a former sportsman who uncovers long-suppressed truths about his family's past.
- White Light (1990) – A war novel exploring the moral ambiguities of conflict. It is the first book in the planned Clocks of Death trilogy.
- The Heavy Knife (1991) – The second instalment in The Clocks of Death trilogy, continuing the exploration of violence and mortality. The trilogy was left unfinished at McQueen's death.

=== Short story collections ===
- The Electric Beach (1978)
- The Escape Machine (1981)
- Uphill Runner (1984)
- Death of a Ladies' Man (1989)
- Lower Latitudes (1990)
- Travels with Michael and Me (1992)

=== Children's and young adult fiction ===
- Escape to Danger (1979)
- The Night of the Crocodile (1997)
- The Candelaria Massacre (1997)
- Dead Reckoning (1999)
- Stranger (1999)
- Snake Island (1999)

=== Non-fiction ===
- The Franklin: Not Just a River (1983)
- Miniature Orchids (1992) (with Barbara McQueen)
- Orchids of Brazil (1993) (with Barbara McQueen)

== Sources ==
- Wang, Labao (March 1999). "Australian Short Fiction in the 1980s: Continuity and Change" (PDF). Department of English, University of Sydney. Archived from the original (PDF) on 7 November 2024.
