= Julie Rrap =

Australian artist (born 1950)

- Born: Julie Parr; 1950 (age 75–76); Lismore, New South Wales, Australia
- Education: University of Queensland, National Art School at East Sydney Technical College, University of Sydney, Alexander Mackie College of Advanced Education, Monash University
- Known for: Photography, painting, sculpture, video, drawing

Julie Rrap (also known as Julie Parr, Julie Brown or Julie Brown-Rrap, born 1950) is an Australian contemporary artist who was raised on the Gold Coast in Queensland. She was born Julie Parr, and reversed her name to express her sense of opposition. Since the mid-1970s she has worked in photography, painting, sculpture, video and performance. Julie's work expresses her interest in images of the body, especially the female body.

== Biography ==
Julie was born in Lismore, New South Wales, Australia. Her family relocated to a small town, Nerang, in the Hinterlands off the Gold Coast, Queensland, which is where she grew up with her sister and brothers who included Mike Parr—an artist with whom she has often collaborated.

In 1971, she completed her Bachelor of Arts Degree at the University of Queensland, Brisbane Australia. In 1974 she continued studies in painting and drawing at the National Art School, East Sydney Technical College (later the City Art Institute), at the University of Sydney. In 1975 she studied at the Power Worksheds in the Fine Arts Department of the University of Sydney. In 1976 she studied photo media at the City Art Institute in Sydney.

In Julie Rrap's early career she was running a photographic business with John Delacour who is also a photographer. The business mainly specialised in reproductions of magazines, catalogues, and fine art books.

In 1975 Rrap worked with members of a performance art group (Alex Danko, Mike Parr, Noel Sheridan, Joan Grounds and Tim Burns) from the University of Sydney.

In 1976, Rrap married Bill Brown, a painter.

In the 1980s Rrap focused a lot of her time at universities and art schools such as the Australian Centre for Photography, Alexander Mackie College, Meadowbank, East Sydney Technical College, and Sydney College of the Arts, providing lectures in art and design, painting, photography, and photo-media.

Julie Rrap then lived in France and Belgium between 1986 and 1994. This helped to ground her work in a more international context, and she exhibited widely during this period. In 1994. Julie returned to Australia.

In 2010, Rrap completed her PhD at Monash University in Melbourne, Australia.

Rrap lives and works in Sydney, and frequently travels between Europe and Australia for exhibitions and the creation of her works. She continues to work in the Faculty of Arts and Social Sciences at the University of Sydney and leads research and publishes about artists.

== Artist career ==
In 2018, The University of Sydney School of Architecture, Design and Art published interviews with three Creative Women of Sydney. In her interview, Rrap noted that

"As a very young artist I was very influenced by the writings of Simone de Beauvoir but as art history did not foreground the work of many women artists it was hard to think at the time of women artists who might influence my work." She continued "this ‘lack therefore influenced my decision to make art as I felt there was so much missing from that history that could represent female sensibilities."

Rrap's artistic career began in the 1970s where she explored painting, performance, photography, sculpture and video.

Rrap’s artistic influences throughout her career have always been the human form and how it is represented in media and society, particularly females in Western Society. Julie uses this influence to "…poke fun at the stereotypical representations of women transforming these characters into active agents for change." – Julie Rrap. Using her body, suggestions of the body and representations of the body to complete her work.

Rrap exhibited her first solo exhibition as Julie Brown in 1982, Disclosures: A Photographic Construct held at the Central Street Gallery in Sydney. This installation was made up of 60 black-and-white and 19 coloured photographs of her own naked body posed to challenge the traditional "male gaze" of the female nude. Some photos showed her in various costumes and various suggestive poses, some cut up and collaged with parts of the body absent. The coloured photos all showed her full nude body. This work influenced future feminist art. Rrap has continued to use her own body in her works right up to her 2009 video work 360 Degree Self-Portrait.

In her early works, Rrap superimposed photos of herself on images by Manet, Degas and Rembrandt. In this way she imposed her own image as an artist to disrupt the given models.

In 1994, her work Transpositions covered a wall with 100 boards on which were printed photographs of historical portraits of women. Each woman's eyes captures the viewer's gaze. They are no longer the model of the original artist, but women on their own. This is Rrap's way of stressing the women's lives over art history and the traditional male gaze. This work was a turning point; she stopped using her own body image. Now she may use skin, leather or other materials but she still explores the relationship between the female image and how it is portrayed in whatever media.

In 2008, a monograph on Julie Rrap entitled Julie Rrap: Body Double was published by Piper Press with the Museum of Contemporary Art to coincide with the exhibition of the same name which ran between 30 August 2007 – 28 January 2008. She has continued to produce works and exhibit including in 2024-25 at the Museum of Contemporary Art solo exhibition Past Continuous.

Julie Rrap is represented by Roslyn Oxley9 Gallery, Sydney and Arc One Gallery, Melbourne

== Awards and honours ==
Rrap has been awarded a number of fellowships, residencies and other recognition, including:

- 1986, Cité internationale des arts, Paris, and Power Institute of Fine Arts, University of Sydney
- 1989, Fellowship Grant - Australia Council for the Arts
- 1995, Multi-Year Fellowship - Australia Council for the Arts
- 1997, Cité Des Arts, Paris, and AGNSW Studio
- 1999, Project Grant - Australia Council for the Arts
- 2001, Hermann's Art Award
- 2002, Fellowship Grant - Australia Council for the Arts
- 2007, Project Grant - Australia Council for the Arts
- 2008, Redlands Art Prize - Mosman Gallery
- 2009, Clemenger Contemporary Art Award - National Gallery of Victoria
- 2009, National Artists’ Self-portrait Prize - University of Queensland Art Museum, Brisbane

== Solo exhibitions ==
- 2004 Soft Targets, Roslyn Oxley9 Gallery, Sydney
- 2005 Soft Targets, ARC One gallery, Melbourne, Australia
- 2005 Gallery, Victoria, Australia
- 2006 Fall Out, Roslyn Oxley9 Gallery, Sydney
- 2007 Embodied, Newcastle Region Art Gallery, Newcastle
- 2007 Body Double, Museum of Contemporary Art, Sydney
- 2009 Escape Artist: Castaway, Roslyn Oxley9 Gallery, Sydney
- 2010 OuterSpace, Arc One Gallery, Melbourne
- 2010 360° Self-Portrait, Roslyn Oxley9 Gallery, Sydney
- 2011 Julie Rrap: Off Balance, Lismore Regional Gallery, Lismore, NSW
- 2012 Loaded, Roslyn Oxley9 Gallery, Sydney
- 2014 Rrapture: Julie Rrap, Newcastle Art Gallery, Newcastle
- 2024 Past Continuous, Museum of Contemporary Art, Sydney

== Collections ==
Images of works by Julie Rrap can be seen at a number of art gallery websites. The following collections all hold works by the artist.

- Art Gallery of New South Wales https://www.artgallery.nsw.gov.au/search/?q=Julie+rrap
- Art Gallery of South Australia https://www.agsa.sa.gov.au/collection-publications/collection/creators/julie-rrap/5932/
- Art Gallery of Western Australia (no images available)
- National Gallery of Australia https://artsearch.nga.gov.au/search.cfm
- National Gallery of Victoria https://www.ngv.vic.gov.au/explore/collection/artist/1369/
- Queensland Art Gallery and Gallery of Modern Art (no images available.
- University of Melbourne, Vizard Foundation Art Collection https://www.vizardfoundationartcollection.com.au/the-nineties/explore/julie-rrap/
