= Peter Bonner =

Australian artist

Peter Bonner is an Australian artist, who in 1996 won the Dobell Prize, the highest prize for drawing in Australia. He was awarded the prize for his work Interior.

Bonner's professional career began as a corporate finance recovery manager in London for accounting firm Price Waterhouse Coopers. He then decided to study fine art, and began an undergraduate degree at Monash University. In his third year, he was awarded the Dobell Prize, making him the only undergraduate student to win the award in the prize's history.

Bonner then accepted a scholarship to study at the New York Studio School of Drawing, Painting and Sculpture.

His work has since been exhibited extensively in the US, Europe and Australia.
