= Neil Emmerson =

Australian artist (born 1956)

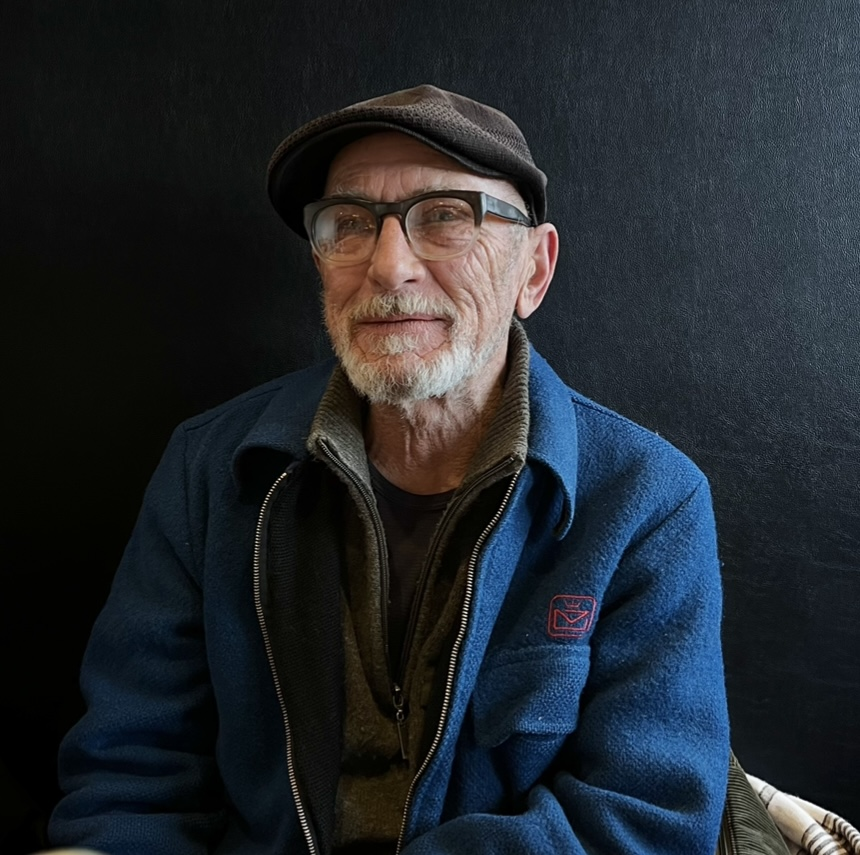
Neil Emmerson in 2024

Neil Emmerson (born 2 November 1956) is an Australian artist and printmaker based in Dunedin, New Zealand. His work often addresses personal identity, as well as the experiences and politics of being a gay man, both in Western culture, as well as in China and East Asia.

Emmerson's work is collected in the National Gallery of Australia, the National Gallery of Victoria, Queensland Art Gallery, the Art Gallery of New South Wales and the Auckland Art Gallery, and he is featured in the 2012 book, 101 Contemporary Australian Artists. Until 2021, Emmerson was a senior lecturer, and head of Dunedin School of Art's print studio. In 2006 he won the Fremantle Print Award.
