= John Spooner =

Australian journalist and illustrator (born 1946)

- Born: 1946 (age 79–80); Melbourne
- Education: Monash University
- Occupations: Journalist illustrator
- Notable credit(s): Five-time winner Stanley Award; Three-time winner Walkley Award; Graham Perkin Award Journalist of the Year; Joint winner of the 1986 Fremantle Print Award

John Spooner B.Juris, LLB (Monash) (born 1946) is an Australian journalist and illustrator who regularly contributed to The Age newspaper.

John Spooner was born in Melbourne in 1946. He practised as a lawyer for three years before he commenced drawing for The Age in 1974, finally leaving the law altogether in 1977 to draw full-time for the newspaper.

Spooner's works are represented in the collections of the National Gallery of Australia, National Library of Australia, the National Gallery of Victoria, the State Library Victoria, the Melbourne Cricket Club Museum, public and private collections throughout Australia and internationally.

His publications include the book A Spooner in the Works, published in 1999 by Text Publishing, comprising cartoons, prints and paintings; and Taxing Air: Facts and Fallacies about Climate Change, which he co-authored with Robert M. Carter, William Kininmonth, Martin Feil, Stewart W. Franks and Bryan Leyland; published by Kelpie Press in 2013.

Spooner has received various awards. Between 1985 and 1986 Spooner was awarded five Stanley Awards, including the Black and White Artist of the Year Gold Stanley Award. In 1994 Spooner was awarded two Walkley Awards for Best Illustration and Best Cartoon. He was the joint winner of the 1986 Fremantle Print Award as well as the 2002 Graham Perkin Australian Journalist of the Year Award.

He left The Age in May 2016 along with others made redundant by Fairfax Media. In 2018 he published What the Hell Was He Thinking? John Spooner's Guide to the 21st Century, a collection of his 21st-century work annotated with his own commentary.

In 2019 he joined The Australian as an editorial cartoonist.
