= Amanda Robins =

Australian artist (born 1961)

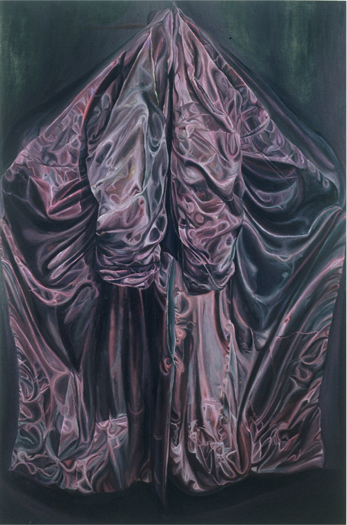
Amanda Robins, Harris Tweed (Open Coat III), 2004. Oil on linen, 122 x 183 cm.

Amanda Robins (born 1961) is an Australian contemporary artist who is best known for her paintings and large-scale drawings of clothing and drapery.

She trained in Melbourne at the Chisholm Institute of Technology, and the Victorian College of the Arts. She became the Studio Head of Painting and Drawing at the South Australian School of Art, University of South Australia.

Her drawings have been frequently selected to hang in the Dobell Prize for Drawing at the Art Gallery of NSW. Her entry in 2001, Linen dress, was subsequently purchased by Margaret Olley and donated to the gallery.

Robins has held eight solo exhibitions, and participated in over 30 group exhibitions.

Her work is held by Artbank, the Art Gallery of NSW, the Benalla Regional Art Gallery in Victoria, and many private collections.

== Exhibitions etc ==
- 3rd International Biennial of Pastel Drawing, (Exhibition Catalogue), 1992.
- Public Sphere, Private Space (Exhibition Catalogue), Linden Gallery, Melbourne, 1992.
- (un) authorised duplication (Exhibition Catalogue), 200 Gertrude Street, Melbourne 1994.
- John McDonald, Art Review, Sydney Morning Herald, 18 March 1995.
- Christopher Heathcote, Art Review, The Age, 29 April 1995.
- Rita Erlich, Art Of The You Beaut Country, The Age, 8 June 1996.
- Bruce James, Me, Myself an Eye (Art Review), Sydney Morning Herald, 31 October 1998.
- Neville Drury, Images 3, Contemporary Australian Painting, (cover image), Craftsman House and G+B Arts International, 1998.
- Victoria Hynes, Critic's Picks, Sydney Morning Herald, 24 August 2001.
- Hendrik Kolenberg, Drawing the spotlight, Look, June 2002, 19 (colour illus.), pg. 18–19.
- Jacaranda Acquisitive Drawing Award (Exhibition Catalogue), Grafton Regional Gallery, 2002
- Robert Nelson, Prize show offers fascinating tour of new directions, The Age, 21 September 2002.
- Heidi Maier, Art prize entries like chalk and cheese, Courier-Mail, 7 April 2003.
- Elizabeth Fortescue, Battle lines drawn as some see the light on artwork, Daily Telegraph, 13 September 2003.
- The Hutchins Art Prize (Exhibition Catalogue), 2003.
- Hendrik Kolenberg & Anne Ryan, The Dobell prize for drawing: the first ten years (Exhibition Catalogue), Art Gallery of NSW, 2003.
- Jacaranda Acquisitive Drawing Award, Grafton Regional Art Gallery, (Exhibition Catalogue), 2004.
- College of Fine Arts Magazine, January, 2005.
