= Merrick Fry =

Australian artist (born 1950)

Merrick Fry is an Australian artist who was born in Bathurst in 1950. Fry studied at the East Sydney Technical College (now the National Art School) from 1970 to 1972, graduating in 1973

In 1985, Fry wrote and illustrated Stick in the Mud. In the same year, critic John Macdonald described his work as an "intimate view of the bush".

Fry created the images for the Wooly Mammoth Campaign and Annandale Heritage Festival.

Bathurst Regional Art Gallery has 25 works by Merrick Fry. In 2013 the Bathurst Gallery hosted a retrospective exhibition of Fry's work "Merrick Fry: A Life Looked At"

In 2014, Fry was commissioned to install a work in the foyer of the SMART Infrastructure Facility at Wollongong University.

== Collections ==
- National Gallery of Australia's collection of Australian Prints
- Big country road, UNSW Art Collection
- Bathurst Regional Art Gallery Collection
- ‘Dammed Breakaway’ Gatineau Jackson Art Collection
- University of Western Sydney

== Awards ==
- 2001 Jackson Smith Sculpture Prize, Defiance Gallery, Sydney
- 1985 Visual Arts Board Grant, New York Studio residency, USA
- 1979 Selected, George's Art Prize, Melbourne
- 1972 Mirror-Waratah Painting Prize, Sydney
- 1972 National Art School Drawing Prize, Sydney

== Exhibitions ==
In 2015, Merrick Fry had a major exhibition – The Charmer's Picnic.

Merrick Fry has had solo and group exhibitions including with Janet Dawson in Sydney in 2010 and they were exhibiting together in Goulbourn in 2015 In 1986, a critic wrote of Fry's work: "His surfaces of seemingly agitated linear activity gradually reveal a meaningful structure of the landscape."

In August 2013, the Bathurst Regional Gallery hosted an extensive survey exhibition of Merrick Fry's art
