= Rebecca Beardmore =

Canadian artist

Rebecca Beardmore is a Canadian contemporary printmaker, photographer and installation artist. Her work can be found in many museums and galleries in North America, Europe, Asia, and Australia. Born in Montreal, Canada, she currently works in Sydney, Australia.

== Exhibitions and important collections ==
=== Solo exhibitions ===
- On Reflection, Artereal Gallery, Sydney (2010)
- Seeing Words, Reading Pictures, Artereal Gallery, Sydney (2009)
- Seeing Between, Artereal Gallery, Sydney (2008)
- Shifting Point, First Draft Gallery, Sydney (2003)
- Whisper, Fine Arts Building Gallery, Edmonton (2001)

=== Collections ===
- Guangdong Museum of Art, China
- Art Gallery of New South Wales, Australia
- Rhodes Island School of Art and Design, Museums and Collections
- Print Study Centre, University of Alberta, Canada
- University of Texas, Museums and Collection, USA
- Western Sydney University, Sydney

== Awards ==
- Fremantle Arts Centre Print Award (winner) (2010)
- Josephine Ulrick & Win Schubert Photography Award (finalist) (2010)
- Southern Graphics Council, invited speaker, Kansas City (2007)
- Evolution Art Prize (2002)
- Musashino Art University, Tokyo, Japan, Artist in residence, April–July (2001)
- Alberta Foundation for the Arts, Grant (1999)
- KPMG achievement award (1999)
- Australian Printmedia Awards (1997)

== Sources ==
- https://www.artereal.com.au/home/rebecca-beardmore
- https://sydney.edu.au/sca/profiles/Rebecca_Beardmore.shtml
