= Jan Senbergs =

Australian-Latvian artist (1939–2024)

Jan Senbergs AM
- Born: Jānis Feliks Šēnbergs; 29 September 1939; Riga, Latvia
- Died: 23 February 2024 (aged 84); Melbourne, Victoria, Australia
- Known for: Painting, drawing, printmaking, screen printing
- Awards: Dobell Prize (1995); Kedumba Drawing Prize (1991)
- Website: Official website

Jan Feliks Senbergs AM (Latvian: Jānis Šēnbergs; 29 September 1939 – 23 February 2024) was an Australian artist and printmaker of Latvian origin.

== Life and work ==
Senbergs was born in 1939 in Riga, Latvia. World War II forced Senbergs and his family out of Latvia to Germany and eventually to Australia, arriving in Melbourne in 1950. As a young adult, Senbergs was educated at Richmond Technical School, where he learnt technical and free drawing, going on to become a silkscreen printer once he left school at 15. The skills he learnt as an apprentice were defining in the beginning of his career in the 1960s and 1970s, when he became, arguably, one of the best silkscreen printmakers in Australia. Senbergs moved on from screen printing to the industrial cityscapes and ports of Melbourne, the mined landscapes of Tasmania and the Antarctic wilderness.

Spanning his 50-plus year career he has covered figuration, surrealism, expressionism and abstraction in his prints, paintings and drawings. Senbergs has had many career highlights, including receiving the Helena Rubinstein Travelling Scholarship in 1966, representing Australia at the São Paulo Art Biennial in Brazil in 1973 and being commissioned for a large-scale mural for the High Court of Australia, Canberra in 1980. He has had various important roles in his career including member of the Visual Arts Board of the Australia Council from 1984 to 1987, Trustee of the National Gallery of Victoria from 1984 to 1989 and in 1989 he was appointed the Visiting Professor – Chair of Australian Studies at Harvard University, Boston.

Senbergs died on 23 February 2024.

== Exhibitions ==
Senbergs started exhibiting in the early 1960s in Melbourne, at Argus Gallery, and in Sydney, at Rudy Komon Gallery, and has continued to exhibit regularly across Australia, as well as internationally. He has held over 45 solo shows and participated in nearly 70 group shows throughout his 50 plus year career. Senbergs has had many survey exhibitions, including Imagined Sites – Imagined Realities at the Heide Museum of Modern Art in 1993, Jan Senbergs Drawing at Ballarat Fine Art Gallery in 2006, which went on to tour regional Australia in 2007, and Jan Senbergs: From Screenprinter to Painter at the Art Gallery of New South Wales in 2008.

Senbergs has also exhibited considerably overseas, starting early on in his career with Young Australian Painters in 1965 in Tokyo, Japan and continuing with Australian Prints Today at the Smithsonian Institution in Washington DC in 1966 and Australian Prints at the Victoria & Albert Museum, London in 1972. Early in his career Senbergs was included in various Biennials, such as the International Biennale of Graphic Art in Kraków, Poland in 1966, the Bradford Print Biennale, in Bradford, United Kingdom and the International Print Biennale, in Tokyo, Japan both in 1968. Most notably he was chosen to represent Australia at the São Paulo Biennial in Brazil in 1973. He held a solo show at the Australian Print Workshop in Melbourne and featured in the Blue Chip XV: The Collectors’ Exhibition at Niagara Galleries and Mixtape 1980s: Appropriation, Subculture, Critical Style at the National Gallery of Victoria in 2013. In 2016, he was exhibited in Jan Senbergs: Observation - Imagination at the National Gallery of Victoria.

== Collections ==
Senbergs' work is featured in prominent galleries and museums across Australia as well as overseas. He is featured in major state galleries such as National Gallery of Australia, National Gallery of Victoria, Art Gallery of New South Wales, Art Gallery of South Australia and Art Gallery of Western Australia. Internationally, Senbergs is included in the Wadsworth Atheneum, Hartford, Connecticut, the Museum of Fine Arts, Houston, Texas, the Museum of Modern Art, New York, the National Gallery of Art and Washington DC, as well as numerous regional, university, college, corporate and private collections throughout Australia and the US.

== Awards ==
Senbergs has been the recipient of numerous awards and prizes, including the Dobell Prize from the Art Gallery of New South Wales in 1995 and the Kedumba Drawing Prize in 1991. He received an Honorary Award in the Doctor of Arts Honoris Causa from the Royal Melbourne Institute of Technology in Melbourne and was the recipient of the Helena Rubenstein Travelling Art Scholarship in 1966. In 2003 he was made a Member of the Order of Australia in recognition of his "service to the Australian visual arts as a painter whose work has been exhibited in, and forms part of, national and international galleries and collections".
