= Anne Judell =

Australian artist (born 1942)

- Born: 1942 (age 83–84); Melbourne, Australia
- Education: RMIT University, Melbourne
- Known for: Drawing
- Notable work: Breath (2011) (triptych)
- Awards: Dobell Prize, 2011

Anne Judell (born 1942) is an Australian artist and winner of the 2011 Dobell Prize for drawing.

Judell was born in Melbourne in 1942, and studied at RMIT University. She moved to Sydney in 1977 and then to the New South Wales southern highlands in 1992, returning to Melbourne in 2014.

The work of Judell was the subject of a 2002 exhibition at Campbelltown Arts Centre. A 2007 drawing executed in gesso and charcoal on Hahnemühle paper, First light, was selected for inclusion in the Blake Prize exhibition. In 2011, after having been a finalist nine times, she won the Dobell Prize for a triptych, Breath, done in pastel on paper. Judge of the competition, Guy Warren, observed:

"In a world of clashes and chaos this work speaks of something different. With dense layers and subtle surfaces it talks of the mystery of growth, of essences and fragility, of quiet contemplation. It is like a thought once understood and lost, which one tries to grasp again."

A distinctive feature of Judell's method is the time taken to create a drawing, with individual pieces sometimes taking several years. She was reported saying that Breath was unusual in being completed in one year.

Judell's 2011 prize-winning work is held by the Art Gallery of New South Wales, the National Gallery of Australia, and the National Gallery of Victoria.
