= National Art School =

Art school in Sydney, Australia

The National Art School
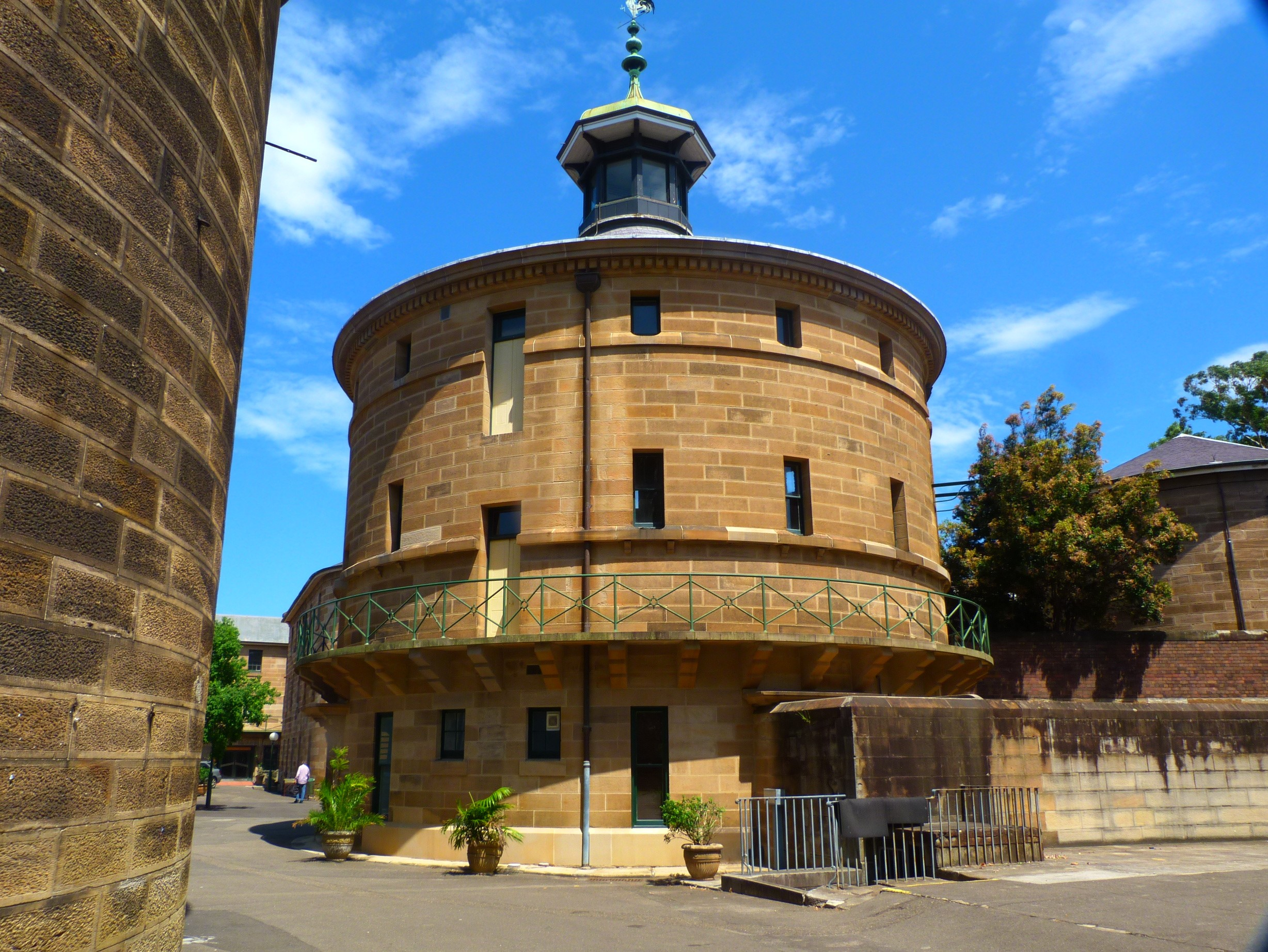
- The National Art School, located in the grounds of the former Darlinghurst Gaol
- Other name: NAS
- Former name: East Sydney Technical College
- Type: Tertiary art school
- Established: 1843; 183 years ago (as Sydney Mechanics’ School of Arts); 1883; 143 years ago (as the Department of Art within the Sydney Technical College)
- Parent institution: Department of Education and Training (1843–2009)
- Accreditation: Australian Qualifications Framework
- Location: Forbes Street, Darlinghurst, Sydney, New South Wales, 2010, Australia; 33°52′47″S 151°13′07″E
- Website: www.nas.edu.au

The National Art School (NAS) is a tertiary level art school, located in Darlinghurst, an inner-city suburb of Sydney, New South Wales, Australia. The school is an independent accredited higher education provider offering specialised study in studio arts practice across various disciplines.

With its origins in the formation of Sydney Mechanics’ School of Arts in 1843, NAS has been in operation on the historic Darlinghurst Gaol site in East Sydney in various forms since 1922 and was formerly part of East Sydney Technical College, known as East Sydney Tech. Today NAS is a centre for education, research, scholarship and professional practice in the visual arts and related fields.

== History ==
The National Art School is on Gadigal land in Darlinghurst, Sydney, with its inner-city campus on the heritage-listed site of the former Darlinghurst Gaol which dates from 1822. Building began on the gaol in 1822, with convicts hand-carving the sandstone blocks for the surrounding walls which stood 21 feet (6.5 metres) high when completed in 1824, built in a panopticon design. The gaol complex held prisoners from 1841 to 1914.

The school's history dates back to 1843, when regular art classes were held by John Skinner Prout at the Sydney Mechanics’ School of Arts in Pitt Street, Sydney.

In 1883, the Technical and Working Men's College became known as the Sydney Technical College, which included the Department of Art. This department was relocated to the former Darlinghurst Gaol in 1922, and was then part of East Sydney Technical College. Sydney Technical College's women's handicraft courses, which were led by Mary Ellen Roberts, were transferred too in 1923 to the old gaol. Roberts died in 1924 and she was replaced in 1925 by Eleanor Lilian Gladys Gough.

From 1974, NAS went through a long period of upheaval with a proposal to move the art school out of the Darlinghurst Gaol campus. The decision was fought and protest marches were held but in 1975 the School of Fine Art was transferred to a new institution that would evolve into today's UNSW Art and Design in Paddington, formerly the College of Fine Arts (COFA).

In 1996, after much lobbying, NAS gained independence from TAFE. In 1999, it first offered an accredited Bachelor of Fine Art degree, and a Master of Fine Art in 2001. In, 2009 the School moved out of DET management and became a fully independent tertiary education provider. Since then NAS has expanded its degrees, short courses and public programs, including offering a Doctor of Fine Art from 2019.

In 2019, NAS was designated a State Significant Organisation by the NSW State Government which secured ongoing funding for the School and recognised its important role as a leading tertiary education institution. NAS was also granted a 45-year lease on the former Darlinghurst Gaol site, providing crucial stability for the future.

In 2020 NAS received a significant grant from the NSW State Government for restoration and upgrading of the campus's historic buildings and structures, with the works being undertaken in 2021. The site was also listed on the NSW State Heritage Register in 2021.

== Courses and programs ==
NAS has three full-time visual art degrees: Bachelor of Fine Art (BFA), Master of Fine Art (MFA) and Doctor of Fine Art (DFA). Within the BFA and MFA degrees, students select a major from six artistic disciplines: ceramics, drawing, painting, photomedia, printmaking and sculpture. In addition to learning the skills of their chosen practice, all students also study art history and theory for the duration of their degree.

The degree courses at NAS follow a studio-based teaching model, taught by experienced practicing artists. Each student is allocated their own studio space, and their practical skills are underpinned by core study in drawing for all BFA students.

Entry to the NAS degree program requires core academic qualifications and the submission of a portfolio of work by the applicant which is reviewed by academic staff.

- Bachelor of Fine Art degree: comprises three inter-related study areas of Studio, Drawing and Art History and Theory. Studio Specialisation is offered in the disciplines of Ceramics, Painting, Photomedia, Printmaking and Sculpture. Drawing and Art History and Theory are core subjects that underpin the studio-based study throughout the course.
- Master of Fine Art degree: enables graduates to develop the specialised knowledge and skills required for professional practice and further learning, with an advanced and integrated understanding of their chosen discipline and the broader contexts of visual arts practice.
- Doctor of Fine Art degree: provides a platform for integrating professional expertise and scholarly enquiry within the visual arts, with graduates acquiring an in-depth understanding of the technical and theoretical skills expected of a professional practitioner in the visual arts.

In addition to its tertiary degrees, NAS has an extensive program of short courses and workshops taught by experienced artists that run on campus and online throughout the year, catering to students of all ages, backgrounds and levels of experience in the visual arts.

The school holiday program offers art classes for students from Kindergarten to Year 12, and NAS runs annual outreach education programs such as the Dobell Drawing School for Year 11 students and the Dobell Regional Teachers’ Workshops, funded by the Sir William Dobell Art Foundation.

== Cell Block Theatre ==
The sandstone Cell Block Theatre on the NAS campus was originally D Wing of Darlinghurst Gaol which held some of Sydney's most notorious female criminals including Kate Leigh.

After the closure of the gaol the buildings became derelict until East Sydney Technical College moved onsite in 1922. The women's wing was transformed into the Cell Block Theatre, which became a hub of Australia's avant-garde music, theatre and dance scene in the 1960s and 70s, hosting early performances from artists such as John Bell, Yvonne Kenny, Peter Sculthorpe, David Malouf, Jim Sharman and Nick Cave.

It is now used by the school as an educational space for events including lectures, talks, symposiums and exhibitions, and also as a venue for hire.

== Galleries and exhibitions ==
In addition to its role as an educator, NAS presents a professionally curated annual public exhibition program. Exhibition spaces on campus include the Rayner Hoff Project Space, The Drawing Gallery (opened in 2021) and the two-storey NAS Gallery, which presents up to four major public exhibitions each year as well as the annual NAS Grad Shows featuring the work of graduating students.

NAS's galleries attract more than 30,000 visitors a year, and the critically acclaimed exhibition program promotes and supports Australian contemporary artists alongside other Sydney public art institutions such as the Art Gallery of NSW, the Museum of Contemporary Art and the Museum of Applied Arts and Sciences.

In 2021, NAS presented the Dobell Drawing Prize#22, a long-running biannual prize supported by the Sir William Dobell Art Foundation; Queer Contemporary: Skin Deep, a performance art project and exhibition for the Sydney Gay and Lesbian Mardi Gras; From the Mountain to the Sky: Guy Warren Drawings, celebrating the 100th birthday of NAS alumnus Guy Warren; and John Olsen: Goya's Dog, a major retrospective for NAS alumnus and former teacher John Olsen.

NAS exhibitions are accompanied by scholarly catalogues and public programs including talks, workshops and symposia to foster the interpretation, understanding and appreciation of art. In 2021 NAS co-presented the Frame of Mind: Mental Health and the Arts public program with Edith Cowan University in Perth, including talks, exhibitions, symposia and a publication.

NAS has been a participating venue for the Biennale of Sydney, the Sydney Festival, the Sydney Gay and Lesbian Mardi Gras, VIVID, Sydney Craft Week, and the annual Sydney Contemporary art fair, exhibiting the work of recent NAS graduates.

== Dobell Drawing Prize ==
In 2019 NAS partnered with the Sir William Dobell Art Foundation to produce the Dobell Drawing Prize #21. The Dobell Prize for Drawing had previously been presented by the Art Gallery of NSW, starting in 1993. The new iteration of the Prize at NAS aims to showcase technical skill, innovation and expanded definitions of drawing, with a major exhibition of finalists open to the public in the NAS Gallery.

In 2019, the $30,000 acquisitive prize was awarded to Justine Varga, who uses photographic processes as a means of drawing. In 2021, the Dobell Drawing Prize #22 showcased drawings by 64 finalists from around the country, and guest judge artist and NAS alumna Lucy Culliton awarded the prize to Euan Macleod for his pastel on paper work Borderlands – Between NSW and QLD (2020).

A People's Prize was awarded for the first time in 2021 to Joanna Gambotto for her work Hill End Interior 1 (Denningtons Cottage: Kim and Lino's), which pays tribute to the vital role the small NSW town of Hill End has played and continues to play in the Australian visual arts, attracting and inspiring generations of artists.

The Dobell Drawing Prize exhibition is part of the NAS Festival of Drawing, a biennial event organised by the School's National Centre for Drawing which was established in 2020. The festival includes talks, workshops and a research symposium, and with the Dobell Drawing Prize complements the School's rigorous academic drawing program. Drawing is a core component of all studies at NAS and is taught throughout each degree.

== National Centre for Drawing ==
In 2020, NAS launched the National Centre for Drawing, which seeks to promote and nurture practice, research and scholarship in drawing, and in 2021 opened The Drawing Gallery, a new exhibition space on campus dedicated to drawing. The inaugural show in The Drawing Gallery was From the Mountain to the Sky: Guy Warren Drawings, a retrospective of NAS alumnus Guy Warren's drawing practice which opened on his 100th birthday, April 16, 2021.

== Notable alumni ==
- Anita Aarons
- Hart Amos
- Gordon Andrews
- Jean Appleton
- Luciana Arrighi
- Yvonne Audette
- Geoffrey Bardon
- Tom Bass
- Charles Blackman
- Vivienne Binns
- Cressida Campbell
- John Coburn
- Kevin Connor
- Richard Cornish
- Lucy Culliton
- Elisabeth Cummings
- Geoffrey de Groen
- Karla Dickens
- Ken Done
- Max Dupain
- Margaret Fink
- Bert Flugelman
- Fiona Foley
- Merrick Fry
- Todd Fuller
- James Gleeson
- Peter Godwin
- Richard Goodwin
- Fiona Hall
- Norman Hetherington
- Frank Hinder
- Ian Howard
- Robert Klippel
- Fred Leist
- Keith Looby
- Fiona Lowry
- Arthur McIntyre
- Michael McIntyre
- Marie McMahon
- James McQueen (writer)
- Guy Maestri
- Reg Mombassa
- Arthur Murch
- Susan Norrie
- Rosaleen Norton
- Robert Owen
- Margaret Olley
- John Olsen
- Roslyn Oxley
- Mike Parr
- Ron Robertson-Swann
- Joan Ross
- Julie Rrap
- Martin Sharp
- Garry Shead
- Jeffrey Smart
- Joshua Smith
- Tim Storrier
- Thancoupie
- Ann Thomson
- Dorothy Thornhill
- Quinton Tidswell
- Barbara Tribe
- Tony Tuckson
- Craig Waddell
- Guy Warren
- Brett Whiteley
- Wendy Whiteley

== NAS Heads and Directors ==
- Samuel Rowe 1922–1933
- Rayner Hoff 1934–1937
- E. C. Walters 1937–1939
- Frank Medworth 1939–1947
- Roy Davies 1948–1960
- Douglas Dundas 1961–1965
- Harold Abbott 1965–1966
- Lyndon Dadswell 1966–1967
- Harold Abbott 1968–1970
- Peter Laverty 1970–1971
- John Coburn 1972–1974
- Tom Thompson 1975–1976
- Mollie Douglas 1976–1979
- Don Mitchell 1980–1985
- Meg Gregory 1985–1990
- Ted Binder 1990–1996
- Jeffrey Makin 1997–1998
- Bernard Ollis 1998–2009
- Anita Taylor 2009–2013
- Simon Cooper 2013–2014 (acting)
- Michael Snelling 2014–2016
- Michael Lynch 2016–2017 (interim)
- Steven Alderton 2017–present
