= Jennifer Keeler-Milne =

Australian artist (born 1961)

Jennifer Keeler-Milne (born 1961) is an Australian contemporary artist who is best known for her sumptuous landscape oil paintings and large-scale charcoal drawings. Keeler-Milne draws on traditional oil painting techniques to create striking contemporary works. She trained in Melbourne at Melbourne State College, the Victorian College of the Arts, and the College of Fine Arts, COFA. Keeler-Milne was awarded the Fred Williams Family Prize in 1991 by the Victorian College of the Arts. In 2015 her 48 panel drawing work "NSW desert plants" was acquired by the Art Gallery of New South Wales. In 2016, the Glasshouse Regional Gallery at Port Macquarie is exhibiting "Drawn to a cabinet of curiosities" a collection of over 175 charcoal on paper drawings.
