= Rona Green (artist) =

Australian artist (born 1972)

- Born: Geelong, Australia
- Known for: figurative printmaking, painting, drawing and soft sculpture
- Movement: Printmaking
- Website: ronagreen.com

Rona Green (born 1972, Geelong, Victoria) is an Australian visual artist.

== Work ==
Green is best known for her figurative printmaking, painting, drawing and soft sculptures, which she refers to as poppets, depicting human-animal hybrids.

The artist's area of specialty is printmaking and she has utilised various techniques such as monotype, collograph, linocut, etching, lithography, screenprint, woodcut, wood engraving and digital printing. Green's favoured medium is hand coloured linocut prints.

Transformation is a recurrent theme in Green's art. Her pictures of anthropomorphic figures with decorated bodies celebrate individuals' ability to create identity, adopt alter egos and embrace otherness. She champions misfits, outcasts and outsiders - those on the fringe of society. Humour is also an integral part of Green's work.

== Education ==
Green studied fine art at La Trobe University in the early 1990s. It was at university, under the influential tutelage of Peter Jacobs and John Robinson, that Green decided to major in printmaking. Green studied visual art at Victorian College of the Arts in the late 1990s, and she was awarded a Master of Fine Art degree from Monash University in 2012.

== Exhibitions ==
Green has exhibited extensively since 1994, in Australia and internationally. In 2010 Deakin University Art Gallery held a survey exhibition of her printmaking and soft sculpture, titled Rona Green: Prints and Poppets 2000-2010, and during 2017-2018 Rona Green: Champagne taste and lemonade pockets, a survey show reviewing ten years of Green's printmaking, toured Bendigo Art Gallery and Benalla Art Gallery.

== Awards ==
Green has been the recipient of several awards for her printmaking including the Geelong Print Prize in 2003, Swan Hill Print Acquisitive Award in 2004 and the Silk Cut Award for Linocut Prints Grand Prize in 2006.

== Collections ==
Green's work is held in numerous private and public art collections including the National Gallery of Australia, Bendigo Art Gallery, Geelong Gallery, The Print Council of Australia and Artbank.
