= TarraWarra Museum of Art =

- Location within the Melbourne metropolitan area
- Established: 2002
- Location: Healesville, Victoria, Australia
- Coordinates: 37°39′34.7″S 145°28′9.1″E
- Type: Art museum
- Website: twma.com.au

The TarraWarra Museum of Art is an art museum in Healesville, Victoria, 45 kilometres northeast of Melbourne. It was founded by philanthropists and art collectors, Eva and Marc Besen. Opened in 2003, TarraWarra is a not-for-profit art gallery that features inventive and stimulating exhibitions and programs about twentieth and twenty-first century art. The museum has built a reputation for presenting a unique program of exhibitions curated to inspire curiosity and support emerging and established artists to make new work.

== History ==
TarraWarra Museum of Art Limited was registered in 2000. The museum was formally launched by Prime Minister John Howard on 24 April 2002 in a temporary location in North Melbourne, awaiting completion of a purpose-built museum in the Yarra Valley. The museum building, designed by Alan Powell from architecture firm Powell & Glenn, was opened in 2003.

Founded by philanthropists Eva Besen AO and Marc Besen AC who had been collecting Australian art since 1960s, it was the first museum of art in Australia supported by a significant private endowment. The Besens not only gifted the purpose-built museum, but also donated nearly 600 works of Australian art from their private collection.

During the late 1990s Maudie Palmer worked with its founders to establish the not-for-profit museum as a charity, managed by an independent board. She collaborated in selecting architect Alan Powell from architecture firm Powell & Glenn, project-managed the construction,

The Eva and Marc Besen Centre, a visible storage building which houses over 300 artworks from the museum's permanent collection, opened at the museum on 8 March 2025. The building was designed by Kerstin Thompson Architects.

Palmer oversaw the museum's first nine years of programming after its public opening in 2003, including the 2005 exhibition 'discovering' George Baldessin, and was instrumental in building the museum's permanent collection, extending and contextualising the Besens’ founding gift and initiating the acquisition of First Peoples’ art for the collection. In 2006 she founded the TarraWarra Biennial, which developed into a nationally significant contemporary art exhibition series.

Notable exhibitions curated or co-curated by Palmer at TarraWarra include Echo (2004, with Diane Morgan); John Young: A Survey of Works 1979–2005 (2006); Charles Anderson: A House for Hermes #01 – The House of My Father (2007); John Nixon (2007); and Danie Mellor: Exotic Lies, Sacred Ties (2014). She filled an interim director role in 2011 and advised the Board until 2025.

== Collection ==
Eva and Marc Besen began collecting art in the 1950s. When exhibited in the 1970s, their collection was considered "One of the country's finest collections of Modern Australian art." In addition to the initial gift from the Besen's collection, TarraWarra has continued to acquire works. Artworks from the museum's collection are occasionally featured in scheduled exhibitions.

The collection includes works by notable Australian artists, such as Arthur Boyd, John Brack, Russell Drysdale, Rosalie Gascoigne, Dale Hickey, Susan Norrie, John Olsen, Patricia Piccinini, Clifton Pugh, Jeffrey Smart, Brett Whiteley and Fred Williams.

== TarraWarra Biennial ==
The TarraWarra Biennial was established in 2006 "to identify new developments in contemporary art practice". The exhibition has presented the works of over 200 artists over the course of nine exhibitions to date. Providing a significant platform for each of its guest curators to identify and respond to new trends in contemporary Australian art, each iteration has had a distinctive and independent curatorial lens.

In 2006, Vincent Namatjira's work, Endless circulation, which comprised a series of portraits of the seven Prime Ministers who had been in power in Australia during his lifetime until that point, was exhibited, along with work by Vernon Ah Kee, Helen Johnson, Wukun Wanambi, Sarah crowEst and Agatha Gothe-Snape.

The third Biennial, in 2012, Sonic Spheres, was curated by the museum's director Victoria Lynn. It brought together 21 pieces using music, sound and voice, and included leading Australian sound artists as well as artists more known for their work in other media. Two examples of the latter were Angela Mesti's Some Dance to Remember, Some Dance to Forget and Christian Thompson’s Dhagunyilangu – Brother, sung in the Bidjara language.

The 2026 event, We Are Eagles, was curated by First Nations artist Kimberley Moulton. She chose the title based on a quote by elder Sir Doug Nicholls who, on the 1938 Aboriginal rights protest known as the Day of Mourning, included these words in his address to the crowd: "We do not want chicken-feed... we are not chickens; we are eagles". The exhibition, which includes paintings, sculptural works, ceramic art, and film, is focused on "regenerative practices and trans-cultural connections to land". It includes works by Maree Clarke, Angela Tiatia, and Gunybi Ganambarr.

Year	Title	Date	Curator(s)	Ref.
2006	Parallel Lives: Australian Painting Today	4 August –12 November 2006	Victoria Lynn	
2008	Lost & Found: An Archeology of the Present	1 August – 9 November 2008	Charlotte Day	
2012	Sonic Spheres	5 August – 9 December 2012	Victoria Lynn	
2014	Whisper in My Mask	16 August – 16 November 2014	Natalie King and Djon Mundine	
2016	Endless Circulation	19 August – 6 November 2016	Helen Hughes and Victoria Lynn	
2018	From Will to Form	3 August – 6 November 2018	Emily Cormack	
2021	Slow Moving Waters	27 March – 11 July 2021	Nina Miall	
2023	ua usiusi faʻavaʻasavili	1 April – 16 July 2023	Léuli Eshrāghi	
2025	We Are Eagles	29 March – 20 July 2025	Kimberley Moulton	
