= Rick Amor =

Australian artist and figurative painter

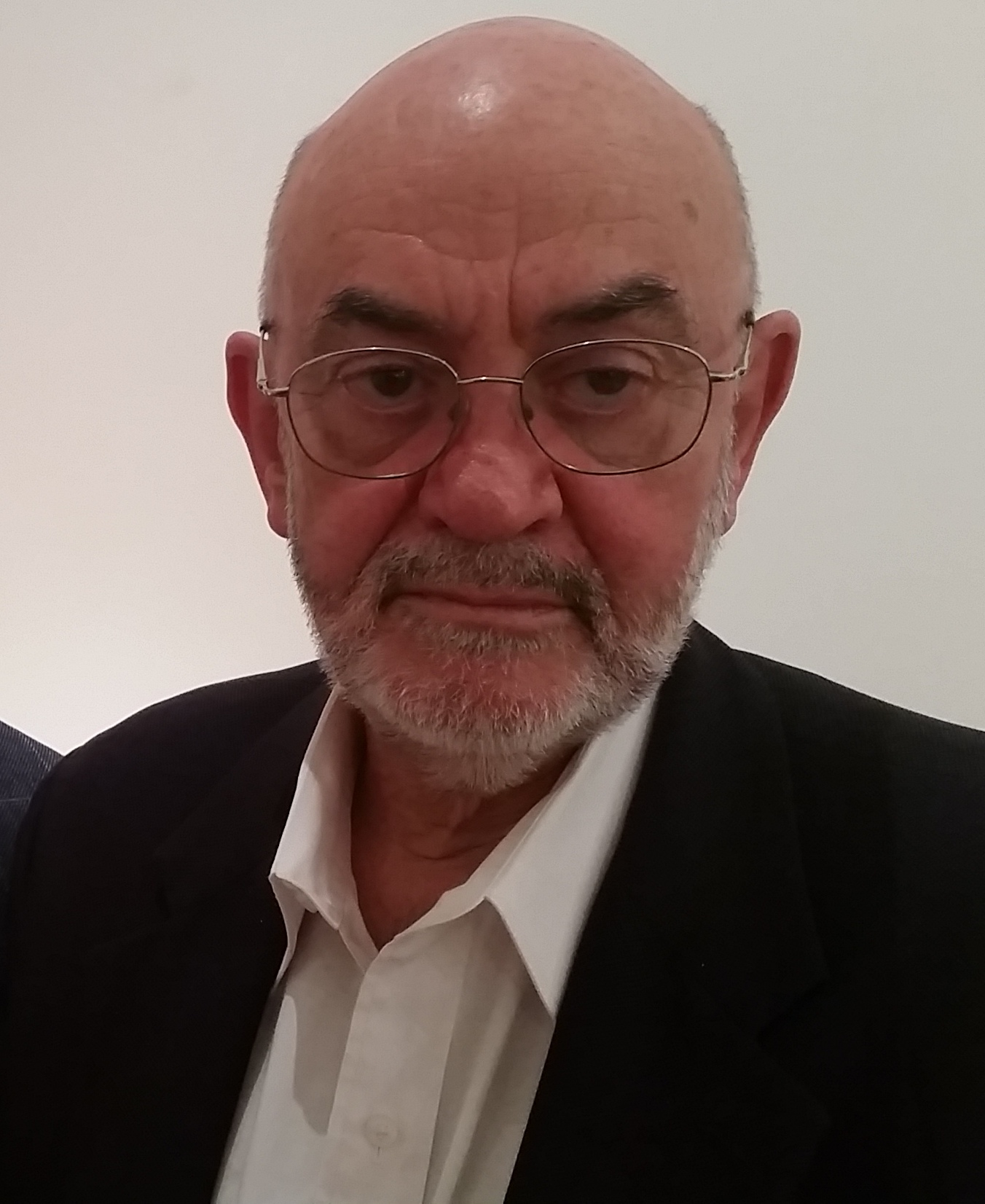
- Rick Amor
- Born: Richard William Amor; 3 March 1948; Frankston, Australia
- Education: National Gallery School, Melbourne
- Known for: Painting, drawing, sculpture, printmaker
- Awards: McClelland Sculpture Award 2007

Rick Amor
- Old Seas
- Artist: Rick Amor
- Year: 2004
- Medium: Oil on canvas
- Dimensions: 81 cm × 100 cm (32 in × 39 in)

Richard William Amor (born 3 March 1948) is an Australian artist and figurative painter. He was an Official War Artist for Australia.

== Life and work ==
Rick Amor was born in Frankston, Victoria, Australia. He has a certificate in art from the Caulfield Institute of Technology, and Associate Diploma in Painting from the National Gallery School, Melbourne.^{[1]}

He began exhibiting at the Joseph Brown gallery in 1974 and has shown annually at Niagara Galleries since 1983. Amor has entered the Archibald Prize at over 10 times and been exhibited nine times. He has been the recipient of several Australia Council studio residencies, allowing him to work in London, New York and Barcelona. In 1999 he was one of the first Australian artists to be appointed as the Official War Artist to East Timor by the Australian War Memorial, and the first since the end of the Vietnam War.

Over the course of his artistic career, Amor has held over 70 solo exhibitions and over 100 group shows. In 2013 a 30th Anniversary exhibition of his extended practice was held at Niagara Galleries. In 1990 McClelland Gallery curated a major survey exhibition of his paintings, which went on to tour various regional galleries in Victoria and South Australia throughout 1990 and 1991. An exhibition of his prints toured various regional galleries in Victoria and Tasmania between 1993 and 1994.^{[2]} In 1993 another exhibition staged by Bendigo Art Gallery toured Australia. Amor's most recent exhibitions include Rick Amor: Contemporary Romantic at Art Gallery of South Australia, Adelaide in 2017, Rick Amor: 21 Portraits at the National Portrait Gallery in Canberra in 2014, Rick Amor: From Study to Painting in 2013 at Castlemaine Art Gallery and Historical Museum, Victoria, and an exhibition at the Australian Print Workshop in 2012. Recent significant group shows have included the 2017 Blue Chip XIX: The Collectors’ Exhibition, at Niagara Galleries, the Melbourne Art Fair, Melbourne, and the Small Sculpture Fair at McClelland Sculpture Park and Gallery in 2013.

In 2005, Peter Berner interviewed Amor for a documentary about the Archibald Prize entitled Loaded Brush. Major texts on Amor's work have also been published in the last twenty years, including Barry Pearce's 100 Moments in Australian Painting (2014), Gary Catalano's biography, The Solitary Watcher: Rick Amor and his Art (2001), and Gavin Fry's monograph, Rick Amor(2008).

== Paintings ==
Rick Amor's work borrows heavily from the pictorial traditions of Symbolism and Surrealism. The legacy of these art movements manifests within the poetic quality of Amor's style. Amor's handling of light and his alluring manipulation of depth of field in his paintings achieves a sustained sense of tension and mystery that insinuates a multiplicity of meanings. His works include psychologically potent symbolism and his landscapes in particular convey a disquieting atmosphere, with objects saturated by contrasting light and shadows. His major recurring subjects are the solitary watcher, figures at twilight, the vast emptiness of urban spaces and quiet mysterious interiors. Even throughout his journalistic works, such his war paintings of East Timor his works are captivating for their unfathomable subtexts.

Sebastian Smee wrote in a review of Amor's 2008 retrospective exhibition at Heide Museum of Modern Art, that he was:

convinced not only of Amor's singularity in contemporary Australian art – there is really nobody like him – but of his importance. His commitment is unmistakable, his intelligence acute, and his best images impossible to forget.

== Sculpture ==
Since the early 1990s, Rick Amor has also incorporated sculpture into art practice. Amor typically works in the medium of bronze for his sculptural works. He begins the process of creating each mould at home, which he then has cast in foundry using the Lost-wax casting method. Amor's sculptures are object and figure based, and are often incredibly textural to achieve an impression rather than a replication of the subject.

Amor's skill in the medium of sculpture has been recognised by The National Gallery, Canberra who has purchased a two-metre-high bronze sculpture of a dog – "a made-up dog, a survivor".

Rick Amor
- (In its previous location, it is now located in the Sculpture Garden)
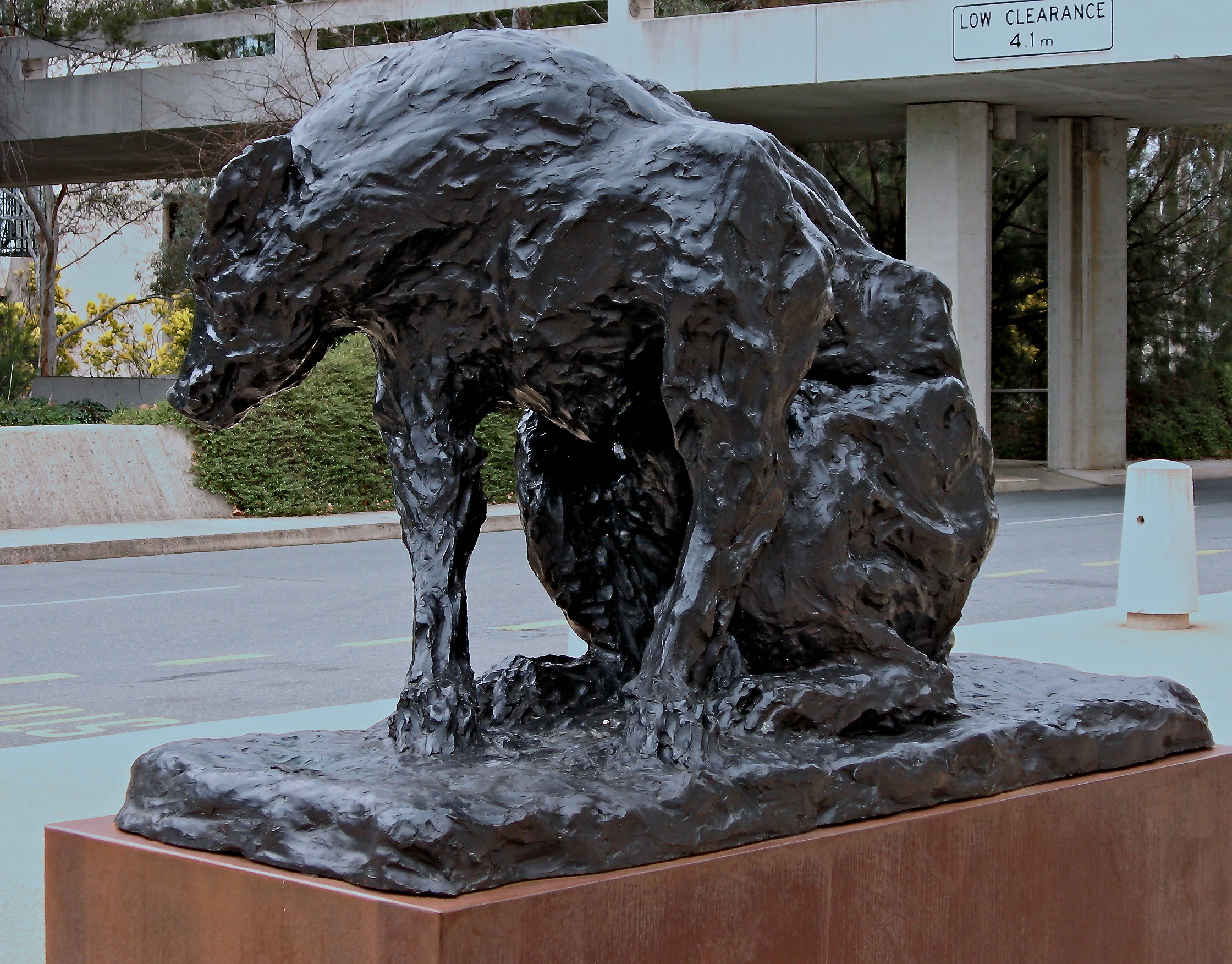
- The Dog
- Artist: Rick Amor
- Year: 2004
- Medium: Bronze
- Subject: A dog
- Dimensions: 100.0 cm × 90 cm × 170 cm (39.4 in × 35 in × 67 in)
- Location: Australian National Gallery, Canberra
- Website: http://cs.nga.gov.au/Detail.cfm?IRN=130946

Moreover, in November 2007 Rick Amor won the prestigious $100,000 McClelland Sculpture Award for his haunting work Relic.

It's a relic, it's a distant memory. I don't know where it came from, from the unconscious. It's not meant to be an Anubis or any Egyptian deity, it's just something that popped up.

Rick Amor
- Relic
- Artist: Rick Amor
- Year: 2006
- Type: Bronze, cor-ten steel
- Dimensions: 204. cm × 62 cm × 72 cm (80 in × 24 in × 28 in)
- Location: McClelland Gallery and Sculpture Park, Langwarrin, VIC

artsACT commissioned a version of Relic for the city of Canberra, which is in situ near the intersection of Childers Street and University Avenue.. images

== Collections ==
Rick Amor is represented in numerous private and permanent public collections. Australian public collections include National Gallery of Australia, Canberra; National Portrait Gallery, Canberra; Ballarat Fine Art Gallery, Ballarat; Heide Museum of Modern Art, Victoria; Geelong Gallery, State Library of Victoria; Castlemaine Art Museum; as well as numerous state, regional and university collections throughout Australia.

== Awards ==
- 2014 The Australian Print Workshop George Collie Memorial Award, The Australian Print Workshop, Melbourne
- 2007 The McClelland Award, McClelland Gallery+Sculpture Park, Victoria
- 2000 Awarded the Visual Arts/Craft Board London Studio, England
- 1995 Awarded the Visual Arts/Craft Board Green Street Studio, New York
- 1991 Awarded the Visual Arts/Craft Board Barcelona Studio, Spain
- 1989 National Australia Bank Art Prize
- 1987 Castlemaine Drawing Prize (Second Prize)
- 1980 Artist in Residence, Victorian Trades Hall Council
- 1975 Visual Arts Board Grant
- 1968 National Gallery Traveling Scholarship
- 1967 National Gallery Drawing Prize (shared)
- Hugh Ramsey Portrait Prize
