= Mike Parr =

Australian artist

Parr Mike Parr
- Education: National Art School, Australia
- Known for: Performance
- Website: www.daao.org.au/bio/mike-parr/biography/

Mike Parr is an Australian performance artist, printmaker and painter. Parr's works have been exhibited in Australia and internationally, including in Brazil, Cuba, France, Germany, Hungary, Japan, Korea, Taiwan, and the United States.

In the 1970s, he co-founded the artist cooperative Inhibodress with Peter Kennedy and Tim Johnson.

== Early life and education ==
Parr spent his childhood in rural Queensland. He is the brother of installation/photography artist, Julie Rrap (formerly Julie Brown-Rrap). He was born with a misshapen arm, and this physical characteristic has featured within his art work.

Parr commenced an arts/law degree at the University of Queensland in 1965, but discontinued his studies the following year. He moved to Sydney and, in 1968, briefly enrolled at the National Art School to study painting.

== Career ==
In 1970, with Peter Kennedy (born 1945) and Tim Johnson, Parr established "Inhibodress", an artist cooperative and alternative space for conceptual art, performance art and video art, after the Tin Sheds had paved the way for such spaces. It was an important space for artists from 1971 to 1972.

Parr's performances explore physical limits, memory and subjectivity. They often depict self-mutilation or extreme physical feats (as in the case of 100 Breaths). The performances are documented photographically and on video.

Parr has been represented by the Anna Schwartz Gallery (owned by the wife of publisher Morry Schwartz) since around 1987, but she terminated the relationship from after the close of his exhibition Sunset Claws, on 16 December 2023. His contract was terminated in an email on the morning following a performance called "Going Home" on Saturday 2 December, in which he referenced the Gaza war. The four-and-a-half-hour performance involved Parr painting words on the gallery walls with his eyes shut. His painted text was drawn from the London Review of Books, Guardian Australia, as well as various unattributed quotes. Schwartz, who is Jewish, issued a statement later saying "Sadly I ended the association between Anna Schwartz Gallery and Mike Parr due to a serious breach of trust and difference of values". The action has led to a wider debate about censoring artists. Speaking on RN Breakfast, Schwarz said that she thought Parr was "the greatest artist this country has ever and perhaps will ever produce", and that she was not censoring his work. What she had objected to in particular was using the word "Nazi" and the word "Israel" on the wall together, which made her feel sick, and she also felt personally hurt by Parr.

== Works ==
Parr's early works were designed to get a reaction from the audience, though he also focused on exploring questions of identity, memory, and states of being. He particularly used his body as a performative tool, often using his prosthetic arm and testing the physical limits of his body through endurance challenges.

For one of Parr's earlier works, he sat in front of his audience and began talking to them in a conversational manner, then very suddenly brandishes an axe and begins hacking into his prosthetic arm which he had filled with minced meat and fake blood. Most of the people in the audience were not aware of his disability, and therefore shock factor was the main aim.

In the late 60s, Parr's performances were started with "psychotic" episodes in which he cut and attacked his body, which he cites as "psychotic operation(s)".

In 1971 he began to write his book Programmes & Investigations, in which he recorded grotesque performance ideas, including letting a dog drink the performer's blood and sewing a fish onto one's skin. By 1973, he had listed over 150 different ideas, performing the actions as he wrote them down, and it became the basis for his activity for more than a decade.

In 1981 Parr stopped performing and began painting and printmaking, later returning to performance art in the 90s.

In 2002, Parr's most challenging performance, "For Water from the Mouth" was held at the gallery Artspace – a work of ten whole days where Parr was isolated in a room with no human contact, and nothing but water to keep him alive. His every action was surveyed by surveillance cameras and broadcast live on the Internet for 24 hours a day.

"A stitch in time" was another of his performances, a live web cam showing Parr having his lips and face extensively stitched with thread into a caricature of shame.

In 2003, one of Parr's extended performances was as live web broadcast received more than 250,000 hits in the first 24 hours alone. For 30 hours Parr sat in a gallery (again at Artspace) with his non-prosthetic arm nailed to the wall in opposition to the Australia government's treatment of refugees and asylum seekers. This was called "Malevich (A Political Arm)".

In June, 2018, he had himself interred in a room constructed below a street in Hobart, Tasmania, for 72 hours, sustained only by water and soup. This was to highlight the fate of Aboriginal Tasmanians, among other issues. Metaphorically, the issues (as represented by Parr) are buried but are still there, ready to resurface at inconvenient times; including colonialism and communal and personal histories.

His work was included in the March 2020 Adelaide Biennial of Australian Art at the Art Gallery of South Australia, which is titled "Monster Theatres".

== Exhibitions ==
Selected Solo Exhibitions

- 1970 Light Pieces & Painted Constructions, Reid Gallery, Brisbane
- 1972-3 Trans-Art 1: Idea Demonstrations (with Peter Kennedy), Inhibodress Gallery, Sydney; Veste Sagrada and Museo de Arte Moderna, Rio de Janeiro, Brazil
- 1973 Performance, Actions, Videosystems, Galerie Impact, Lausanne; Galerie Media, Neuchâtel, Switzerland
- 1978 Screening of Rules and Displacement Activities Parts I and II, lectures, Bela Balaczs Studio for Experimental Film, Budapest, Hungary
- 1983 Black Box: The Theatre of Self Correction, Part 2, The Performance Space, Sydney

Cloacal Corridor (O Vio Prote/O Vio Proto/O Vio Loto/O Thethe) Self Portrait as a Pair or Self Portrait as a Pun, drawing installation; Identification Number 1 (Rib Markings in the Carnarvon Ranges, North-West Queensland), January 1975, photoseries Screenings of Rules and Displacement Activities Parts I, II and III; Performance presentation from George Brecht's WaterYam, Institute of Modern Art, Brisbane. Curator: Barbara Campbell Drawings, Art Projects, Melbourne

- 1984 Towards the Other Side (Self Quotations), three drawing series, Royal Melbourne Institute of Technology Gallery, Melbourne. Curator: John Smithies
- 1985 Portage, Roslyn Oxley9 Gallery, Sydney; Fine Art Gallery, University of Tasmania, Hobart
- 1986 The Parting of the Red Sea, Siegal Contemporary Art Inc., New York
- 1989 Mike Parr, Roslyn Oxley9 Gallery, Sydney, June; City Gallery, Melbourne, July; Milburn + Arté Gallery, Brisbane
- 1990 I think of Drypoint in terms of Braille and Excavation, survey of prints from 1988 to 1990, The Drill Hall Gallery, National Gallery of Australia, Canberra
- 1991 Mike Parr, Artist in Residence 1990–1991, Ian Potter Gallery, The University of Melbourne Museum of Art, Melbourne

3 Installations, City Gallery, Melbourne; Mike Parr, Roslyn Oxley9 Gallery, Sydney Survey of Recent Work, Art Gallery of New South Wales, Sydney; Perth Institute of Contemporary Art, Perth

- 1992 Alphabet/Haemorrhage, 17 performances, Arthouse, Perth, 3 April; 4 performances, Institute of Modern Art, Brisbane, 6 May; 4 performances, City Gallery, Melbourne, 13 June; 9 performances, Museum of Contemporary Art, Sydney, 4 August
- 1993 Mike Parr, Roslyn Oxley9 Gallery, Sydney, September

Black Mirror/Pale Fire, Various Routes, Whistle/White, 3 performances, Ivan Dougherty Gallery, University of New South Wales, Sydney

- 1994 Mike Parr, Anna Schwartz Gallery, Melbourne

Echolalia (the road): Prints from the Self Portrait Project: Mike Parr 1987–1994, National Gallery of Victoria, Melbourne 100 Breaths/100 Songs from (ALPHABET/ HAEMORRHAGE) Black Box of 100 Self Portrait Etchings 5, 1993–1994, performance, Art Gallery of South Australia, Adelaide Fathers 11 (The Law of the Image), installation, Experimental Art Foundation, Adelaide The Bridge, performance, Art Gallery of New South Wales, Sydney

- 1995 The Illusion of the End, Sherman Galleries Goodhope and Hargrave, Sydney

Day Break, performance, Scene Shop at the Cultural Centre of Manila, Manila

- 1996 The Infinity Machine, Sherman Galleries Goodhope, Sydney Anna Schwartz Gallery, Melbourne

Head on a Plate, New York Studio School, New York The White Hybrid (Fading), performance, Artspace, Cowper Wharf/Artspace, Sydney Unword, performance, University of Western Australia

- 1997 Anna Schwartz Gallery, Melbourne
- 1998 Anna Schwartz Gallery, Melbourne Michael Milburn Galleries, Brisbane

Female Factory, 7 hour performance, 25.4 Australian Centre for Contemporary Art, Melbourne Blood Box, 24-hour performance, 6.9/7.9, Artspace, Sydney Boubialla Couta, (performance), College of Fine Arts, Sydney The Rest of Time, Sherman Galleries Goodhope, Sydney Mike Parr, Sherman Galleries Hargrave, Sydney Photo-Realism, Anna Schwartz Gallery, Melbourne

- 1999 Deep Sleep [The Analytical Disabling of Mind and Matter], Nixon/Parr, 72-hour performance, 17.6–20.6, National Portrait Gallery & Lake Burley Griffin, Canberra

Wrong Face, Anna Schwartz Gallery, Melbourne Three Collaborations, Sarah Cottier Gallery, Sydney

- 2000 ARCO, International Contemporary Art Fair, Parque Serial Juan Carosl, Madrid

Shallow Grave, 3-day performance, 7.7–9.7 12th Biennale of Sydney, Art Gallery of New South Wales, Sydney

- Selected Group Exhibitions
- 1971 The Situation Now, Contemporary Art Society, Central Street Gallery, Sydney

John Kaldor Art Project 2: Szeemann: I want to leave a nice welldone child here (20 Australian Artists), Bonython Gallery, Sydney; National Gallery of Victoria, Melbourne

- 1973 Artists' Books, Philadelphia Museum of Art

Recent Australian Art, Art Gallery of New South Wales, Sydney

- 1977 10th biennale de Paris, Musée d'Art Moderne de la Ville de Paris
- 1979 3rd Biennale of Sydney: European Dialogue, Art Gallery of New South Wales, Sydney
- 1980 XXXIX Biennale di Venezia, Giardini, Venice
- 1981 Australian Perspecta 1981: A biennial survey of contemporary Australian art, Art Gallery of New South Wales, Sydney
- 1982 Eureka! Artists from Australia, Institute of Contemporary Art and Serpentine Gallery, London
- 1983 Presence & Absence: Survey of Contemporary Australian Art, No. 1, installation, Art Gallery of Western Australia, Perth

Tall Poppies, an exhibition of five pictures, University Art Gallery, University of Melbourne D'un autre continent 'L'Australie, Le réve et le réel', ARC/Musée d'Art Moderne de la Ville de Paris

- 1984-5 An Australian Accent, Three Artists, Mike Parr, Imants Tillers, Ken Unsworth, P.S.1 (Project Studios One), The Institute of Art and Urban Resources, Inc., New York; Corcoran Gallery of Art, Washington; Art Gallery of Western Australia, Perth; Art Gallery of New South Wales, Sydney

An International Survey of Recent Painting and Sculpture, The Museum of Modern Art, New York

- 1985 5/5, Fünf Vom Fünften, daadgalerie, Berlin

Australian Perspecta 85, Art Gallery of New South Wales, Sydney

- 1986 Prospect '86, An International Exhibition of Contemporary Art, Frankfurter Kunstverein, Schirn Kunsthalle, Frankfurt

Origins, Originality & Beyond, The Sixth Biennale of Sydney, Art Gallery of New South Wales; Pier 2/3, Walsh Bay, Sydney

- 1987-9 The Australian Bicentennial Perspecta, Art Gallery of New South Wales, Sydney; Art Gallery of Western Australia, Perth; Frankfurter Kunstverein, Steirnernes Haus, Frankfurt; Württemburgischer Kunstverein, Stuttgart
- 1988 1988 Australian Biennale. From the Southern Cross: A View of World Art c.1940–1988, The Seventh Biennale of Sydney, Art Gallery of New South Wales; Pier 2/3, Walsh Bay, Sydney; National Gallery of Victoria, Melbourne

Edge to Edge: Australian Contemporary Art to Japan, National Museum of Art, Osaka; Old and New Hara Museums, Tokyo; Nagoya City Museum, Nagoya; Hokkaido Museum, Sapporo

- 1994 Adelaide Installations, the 1994 Adelaide Biennial of Australian Art, Adelaide
- 1995 Antipodean Currents: 10 Contemporary Artists from Australia, Guggenheim Museum SoHo, New York
- 1996 Systems End: Contemporary Art in Australia, OXY Gallery, Osaka; Hakone Open-Air Museum, Tokyo; Dong-Ah Gallery, Seoul, Korea

Spirit & Place: Art in Australia 1861–1996, Museum of Contemporary Art, Sydney

- 1997 Dead Sun, Art Gallery of New South Wales. Curator: Mike Parr; Dead Sun, performance, Art Gallery of New South Wales

Body, Art Gallery of New South Wales In Place (Out of Time): Contemporary Art in Australia, Museum of Modern Art, Oxford; Art Gallery of Western Australia, Perth

- 1998 Wounds: Between Democracy and Redemption in Contemporary Art, Moderna Museet, Stockholm, Sweden

Southern Reflections: An Exhibition of Contemporary Australian Art to Northern Europe, Kulturhaus, Stockholm, Sweden; Konathallen Götsberg, Gothenburg, Sweden; Arhus Konstmuseum, Arhus, Denmark; Museum Tamminiementle (City Art Museum), Helsinki; Neues Museum, Bremen, Germany; Staatliche Sammlung für Kunst, Chemnitz, East Germany Telling Tales, Ivan Dougherty Gallery, University of New South Wales, Sydney

- 1999 Southern Reflections: Ten Contemporary Australian Artists, touring Northern Europe Other Stories: Five Australian Artists, Hokkaido Museum of Modern Art, Sapporo, Japan

Five Continents and One City. Curator: Gao Minglu, Mexico City Gallery, Mexico The Liverpool Biennale, Liverpool, UK Global Conceptualism: Points of Origin, Queens Museum, The Walker Art Centre, Miami Art Centre and other American Museums, 1999/00

- 2000 The 12th Biennale of Sydney, Sydney Biennale 2000, Art Gallery of New South Wales; Museum of Contemporary Art; Artspace and other venues

== Awards ==
- 1990 Joint acquisitive Winner of the Fremantle Print Award

== Collections ==
National Gallery of Australia, the Museum of Contemporary Art in Sydney, all state and many regional galleries, tertiary collections, the National Library in Canberra, Parliament House, Canberra, Chartwell Collection in New Zealand, Chase Manhattan Bank in New York, First National Bank in Chicago, The Michael Buxton Contemporary Australian Art Collection, Art Gallery of Ballarat
