= South Australian Living Artists Festival =

Coordinates: 34°55′49″S 138°35′55″E

SALA Festival
- Genre: Arts festival
- Dates: August
- Location: Adelaide
- Country: South Australia, Australia
- Years active: 1998–present
- Founded: 1998
- Website: Official website

The South Australian Living Artists Festival (SALA, or SALA Festival) is a statewide, open-access visual arts festival which takes place throughout August in South Australia each year.

The SALA features a range of approximately 600 venues including galleries and non-traditional spaces such as cafes, bookshops, and cemeteries which exhibit all forms of visual arts.

== Organisation ==
The SALA Festival was established in 1998 as an initiative of the Australian Commercial Galleries Association, SA Branch, to promote and celebrate visual artists in South Australia. Its aim is to extend audiences for living artists in South Australia, with a policy of inclusiveness which allows all artists at any level and working in any medium to be part of the Festival.

Originally called the South Australian Living Artists Week, its name was changed to SALA Festival in 2002.

The SALA Festival is a not-for-profit organisation that relies on government support, private sponsorship and earned income to invest back into South Australian artists.

=== Governance ===
==== Chair ====
- Alexandrea Cannon, OAM, 2022-present
- Paul Greenaway OAM, founding chair, 1998-2007

== Festival Awards ==
SALA Festival offers a number of prizes to artists and venues.

=== South Australian Living Artist Publication ===
The South Australian Living Artist Publication is an award launched in 1999 as part of the SALA Festival. With funding provided by the South Australian Government, a publication (book) is commissioned and written on a leading South Australian artist or craftsperson with potential for national and international promotion and published by Wakefield Press.

The first recipient of the South Australian Living Artist Publication was Annette Bezor. The most recent recipient whose publication will be published in 2024 is Julia Robinson.

==== South Australian Living Artist Publication recipients ====
- Annette Bezor, 2000
- Kathleen Petyarre, 2001
- James Darling, 2001
- Nick Mount, 2002
- Ian W. Abdulla, 2003
- Deborah Paauwe, 2004
- Michelle Nikou, 2005
- Aldo Iacobelli, 2006
- Julie Blyfeld, 2007
- Gerry Wedd, 2008
- Angela Valamanesh, 2009
- Khai Liew, 2010
- Hossein Valamanesh, 2011
- Mark Kimber, 2012
- Stephen Bowers, 2013
- Nicholas Folland, 2014
- Giles Bettison, 2015
- Catherine Truman, 2016
- Christopher Orchard, 2017
- Clare Belfrage, 2018
- Louise Haselton, 2019
- Kirsten Coelho, 2020
- Roy Ananda, 2021
- Mark Valenzuela, 2022
- Helen Fuller, 2023
- Julia Robinson, 2024

=== SALA Awards ===
Several prizes are awarded as part of the SALA Festival. Prizes and recipients from notable sponsors are listed below:

==== 2008 ====
- The Advertiser Contemporary Art Award: Peter Drew
- Core Energy Sculpture Award: Ariel Hassan
- Centre of Creative Photography Emerging Artist Award: Tushar Wahab
- Established Artist Award: Emma Sterling and Dan Monceaux
- Atkins Technicolour Award Photo Based: David Evans
- Non Photographic Medium: Claire Nielsen
- JamFactory Contemporary Craft and Design Award: Sandy Elverd
- SA Life Emerging Artist Winner: Tushar Wahab
- Rip It Up Award: Robin Eley
- Bunka Moving Image Award: Ryan Sims and Ray Meandering

==== 2009 ====
- The Advertiser Business SA Contemporary Art Prize: Heidi Karo
- Atkins Technicolour Photographic Award: Danica Gacesa McLean
- Centre of Creative Photography Developing Artist Award: Jamie Nuske
- Centre of Creative Photography Latent Image Award: Rebecca Whittemore
- Core Energy Group Sculpture Award: Amy Joy Watson
- JamFactory Contemporary Craft and Design Award: Wesley Harron
- Gosia Schild Moving Image Award: Kyraki Maragozdis
- Rip It Up Emerging Artist Award: Shannon Poulton
- SA Life Young Artist Award: Amy Joy Watson

==== 2010 ====
- The Advertiser Business SA Contemporary Art Prize: Jennifer Trantor
- Atkins Technicolour Photographic Award: Alex Frayne
- Centre of Creative Photography Developing Artist Award: Alison Woodward
- Core Energy Group Sculpture Award: Samantha Bell
- Gosia Schild Award for Best New Work in Moving Image Project: Kyraki Maragozdis
- JamFactory Contemporary Craft and Design Award: Ilona Glastonbury
- Rip It Up Special Art Award: Tutti Visual Arts and Design
- Rip It Up Young Artist Award for the Best Young Artist: Kirsty Shadiac
- SA Life Young Artist Award: Nic Brown
- Adelaide Film Festival Moving Image Partnership Award: Susan Bruce
- Adelaide City Council Encouragement Award: Ryan Sims
- Adelaide Central School of Art Professional Development Award: Angela Black
- OZ Minerals Copper Sculpture Awards: Chris Ormerod (Metro/Regional), Rachel Young (Upper Spencer Gulf/Far North), Victor Harbor High School (school students)

==== 2011 ====
- The Advertiser Business SA Contemporary Art Prize: Christine Cholewa
- Atkins Technicolour Photographic Award: Danica Gacesa McLean
- Centre of Creative Photography Developing Artist Award: Pantelli Pyromallis
- Centre of Creative Photography Latent Image Award: Nerissa Stanley
- JamFactory Contemporary Craft and Design Award: Stephanie James Mason
- Statewide Super Artist Opportunity: Swee Wah Yew and Peter Ahrens
- Rip It Up Special Art Award: Community Bridging Services
- Rip It Up Young Artist Award: Rebecca Prince
- SA Life Emerging Artist Award: Carly Snoswell
- Adelaide City Council Encouragement Award: Kyriaki Maragozidis
- Gosia Schild Award for the Best New Work in the Moving Image Project: Ryan Sims
- Adelaide Central School of Art Professional Development Award: Meaghan Coles
- OZ Minerals Copper Sculpture Award: Mei Sheong Wong

==== 2012 ====
- The Advertiser Business SA Contemporary Art Award: Christine Cholewa
- Adelaide Central School of Art Professional Development Award: Madison Bycroft
- Adelaide City Council Encouragement Award for Moving Image: Patty Chehade
- Atkins Technicolour Photographic Award for Artists Award Winner: Peter MacDonald
- Centre for Creative Photography Latent Image Award Winner: Lee Hopkins
- JamFactory Contemporary Craft and Design Award Winner: Brenden Scott French
- OZ Minerals Copper Sculpture Award: Nicholas Uhlmann
- Rip It Up Publishing Artist Award for Best Young Artist: Wenjing (Cherica) Zhang
- Statewide Super Artist Opportunity: Donovan Christie
- The Austral Hotel Emerging Artist Award: David Frahm

==== 2013 ====
- The Advertiser Business SA Contemporary Art Prize: Marc D. Bowden
- Adelaide Central School of Art Professional Development Award: Therese Williams
- Atkins Technicolour Photographic Award: Wayne Griveli
- Centre for Creative Photography Latent Image Award: Gabriella Szondy
- JamFactory Contemporary Craft and Design Award: Kim Thomson
- OZ Minerals Copper Sculpture Award: Warren Pickering and Anna Small
- Rip It Up Publishing Artist Award: Amy Joy Watson
- The Austral Hotel Emerging Artist Award: Jacky Murtaugh

==== 2014 ====
- The Advertiser Contemporary Art Prize: Henry Jock Walker
- Atkins Technicolour Photographic Award: David Evans
- Centre for Creative Photography Latent Image Award: Bridgette Minuzzo
- JamFactory Contemporary Craft and Design Award: Jennifer Ahrens
- OZ Minerals Copper Sculpture Award: Chris Ormerod
- Rip It Up Publishing Artist Award: Glenn Kestell
- The Austral Hotel Emerging Artist Award: Stuart Templeton
- Adelaide Review Special Art Award: Community Bridging Services
- UnitCare Services Moving Image Award: Madison Bycroft
- Country Arts SA Breaking Ground Award: Morgan Allender

==== 2015 ====
- The Advertiser Contemporary Art Prize: Jason Sims
- Atkins Technicolour Photographic Award: Gary Sauer-Thompson
- Centre for Creative Photography latent Image Award: Emmaline Zanelli
- OZ Minerals Copper Sculpture Award: Mark Ryan
- Rip It Up Publishing Artist Award: Jessica Clark
- City Rural Emerging Artist Award: Alise Hardy
- Adelaide Review Outsider Art Award: Michelle Willsmore
- UnitCare Services Moving Image Award: Fiona Gardner
- Country Arts SA Breaking Ground Award: Cindy Durant
- Brighton Jetty Classic Sculptures Young Artist Award: Joel Zimmermann and Students of Trinity College Year 10 Art
- Don Dunstan Foundation Award: Selina Wallace

==== 2016 ====
- The Advertiser Contemporary Art Prize: Julia Robinson
- Atkins Technicolour Photographic Award: Nathan Stolz
- Centre for Creative Photography Latent Image Award: Nathan Stolz
- OZ Minerals Copper Sculpture Award: Mary Ann Santin
- Adelaide Review Young Artist Award: Emmaline Zanelli
- City Rural Emerging Artist Award: Tina Jade Panagaris
- Adelaide Review Outsider Art Award: Scott McCarten
- UnitCare Services Moving Image Award: Ray Harris
- Country Arts SA Breaking Ground Award: Chris De Rosa
- Brighton Jetty Classic Sculptures Young Artist Award: Jess Taylor and Joel Zimmermann
- Don Dunstan Foundation Award: Andrea Malone
- City of Unley Active Ageing Award: Sheila Whittam
- Centennial Park Environment Award: Tobias Staheli

==== 2017 ====
- The Advertiser Contemporary Art Prize: Julia McInerney
- Atkins Technicolour Photographic Award: Alice Blanch
- Centre for Creative Photography Latent Image Award: Lee Walter
- City Rural Emerging Artist Award: Jane Skeer
- Adelaide Review Outsider Art Award: Len Harvey
- UnitCare Services Moving Image Award: Trent Parke & Narelle Autio
- City of Unley Active Ageing Award: Andrea Malone
- SALA Festival Patron's Art Writer's Award - Andrew Purvis

==== 2018 ====
- The Advertiser Contemporary Art Award: Kaspar Schmidt Mumm
- UnitCare Services Moving Image Award: Cynthia Schwertsik
- Atkins Technicolour Photographic Award: Emmaline Zanelli
- Centre for Creative Photography Latent Image Award: Brett Hughes
- City Rural Emerging Artist Award: Hannah Vorrath-Pajak
- Adelaide Review Outsider Art Award: Alana Gregory
- City of Unley Active Ageing Award: Chris Webb
- Don Dunstan Foundation Award: Gerry Wedd
- Country Arts SA Breaking Ground Award: Nellie Rankine
- BlueThumb People’s Choice Award: Ellie Kammer
- SALA Festival Patron’s Art Writer’s Award – Melinda Rackham
- Credit Union SA Schools Award Winners: Woodside Primary, St Brigid’s School, South Coast schools collective including Encounter Lutheran College, Investigator College and Victor Harbor High School
- Credit Union SA Schools Award Runner Ups: Elizabeth Grove Primary School, Bowden Brompton Community School and St John’s Grammar School

==== 2019 ====
- The Advertiser Contemporary Art Award: Derek Sargent with Jess Miley
- City of Unley Active Ageing Award: Maggie Cecchin
- UnitCare Services Moving Image Award: Grant Parke
- Atkins Photographic Award: Lee Walter
- City Rural Emerging Artist Award: Steven Bellosguardo
- Don Dunstan Foundation Award: Sue Webb & Deborah Baldassi
- Centre for Creative Photography Latent Image Award: Joseph Haxan
- 4th Biennial RSASA / SALA Portrait Prize: Kate Kurucz
- City of Onkaparinga Contemporary Curator Award: Steph Cibich
- Credit Union SA School Awards Winners: St John's Grammar, Riverland Special School, The Heights School and St Gabriel's School
- Credit Union SA School Awards Commendations: Bridgewater Primary School, Woodside Primary School and Bowden Brompton Community School

=== 2020 - present ===
	2020	2021 Winners	2022 Winners	2023 Winners
Active Ageing Award	John Freeman	Rosie Field	Saxon Rudduck	Katrina Linn
Breaking Ground Award	Juanella McKenzie	-	Gail Hocking	-
Contemporary Art Award		-	Deborah Prior	Susan Bruce
Contemporary Curator Award	Suzanne Close	Christina Lauren	Sarah Northcott	-
Digital Media Award	Tom Borgas	Maddie Grammatopoulos	Emmaline Zanelli; Kurt Bosecke; Eloise Holoubek	Marian Sandberg
Don Dunstan Foundation Award	Makeda Duong	Tom Phillips	Allison Chhorn	Tyson Jay Brant
Emerging Artist Award	Amber Cronin	Jianzhen 'Shirley' Wu	Anna Révész	Stephanie Doddridge
Incubator Award	Alycia Bennett	Yoko Kajio	Emmaline Zanelli; Kurt Bosecke; Eloise Holoubek	Kaspar Schmidt Mumm
SALA Artist Residency	-	-	-	Laura Wills and Jackie Saunders
SALA Solo Photographic Opportunity	-	-	David Hume	Yasemin Sabuncu
School Award Winners	Adelaide High School; Faith Lutheran College; St. John's Grammar School; Wirreanda Secondary School	Christies Beach Primary; Littlehampton Primary School; Nuriootpa High School; St Aloysius College	Berri Regional Secondary College; Valley View Secondary School; Woodcroft College; Woodville Gardens Primary School.	-
School Award Commendations	Nuriootpa High School; Walkerville Primary School	Pinnacle College; Riverland Special School	Christies Beach Primary School; Urrbrae Agricultural High School	-
Science in Art Award	-	-	-	Kate Kurucz
Tertiary Student Award	-	Sam Burke	-	-
Venue Award	She is Pop-up Gallery; Collective Haunt Inc.	Bimbimbie Garden; The Garden Depot	Burra Regional Art Gallery	Little Blue Wren Gifts & Art

== Awards ==
- Ruby Awards 2017 Award Community or Regional Impact over $100,000: SALA Festival 2016
- Ruby Awards 2015 Best Event: SALA Festival 2014
- Ruby Awards 2006 Community Impact Award: SALA Festival

== Statistics ==
Statistics of past festivals
Year	Number of participating artists	Number of exhibitions and events	Number of participating venues	Number of visitors
1998	300	48	52	
1999	300+	98	99	
2000	400	117	100+	
2001	500		138	
2002				
2003	600		197	
2004	700		225	
2005	1000		300	
2006	1400	330	260	
2007	1600	430	400	
2008	1000		400	
2009	2,773		500	
2010	3,000+		518	383,614
2011	4,000+		543	
2012	3,543		524	
2013	4,917	502		~510,000
2014	4,627	547		500,000+
2015	5,235	617	557	~600,000
2016	4,699	630	570	~600,000
2017	6,386	660	560	~800,000
2018	9,728	716	622	~850,000
2019	8,000 +	692	581	~870,000
2020	8,500+	665	581	~890,000
2021	9,000+	582	519	~960,000
2022	12,000+	667	603	

== See also ==
- Adelaide Festival of Arts
- Adelaide Fringe
- Adelaide Film Festival
