= Colin Pennock =

- Born: 1964 (age 60–61); Belfast, Northern Ireland
- Education: St. Martin’s School of Art (BA Hons)
- Occupation: Visual Artist
- Spouse: Katrina Pennock (married 2006)
- Website: www.colinpennock.com

Colin Pennock (born 1964) is an Irish-born Australian visual artist, known for his emotionally sensitive abstract landscapes.

== Biography ==
Pennock was born in Belfast, Northern Ireland. He and his family emigrated to Australia when he was one before returning to Ireland in 1976 to attend high school in Ballyclare, County Antrim.

After school, he served five years as a constable in the Royal Ulster Constabulary. The sketchbooks he kept during this turbulent time in Irish history earned him a four-year scholarship to St. Martin’s School of Art in London. He graduated in 1989 with a BA (Hons) in Fine Art Painting.

== Career ==
Pennock started his career as an advertising storyboard artist and illustrator with Margeotes Fertitta and Partners in New York in 1996. He produced storyboards for MTV Animation, contributing to award-winning shows including Daria and Celebrity Deathmatch.

In 1998, Pennock participated in the Culture & Conflict exhibition, exploring Irish identity, at the Puffin Room in New York alongside artists Robert Longo and Willie Doherty. The exhibition was reviewed by Lyell Davies for Issue 85 of Circa Art Magazine and included Pennock's sketchbooks from his time in the Royal Ulster Constabulary. The books were purchased by the British Consulate in Washington, marking his first institutional acquisition.

Pennock returned to Australia in 2001 after witnessing the events of September 11 and established a studio in Sydney, developing a more personal, emotionally resonant painting style. He moved to Queensland’s Noosa Hinterland in 2010.

Pennock’s work is characterised by landscapes that "materialise the experiential and emotional undulations of life" (Elli Walsh essay for Pennock's A Forgotten Traveller exhibition in 2019). His distinctive visual language has been recognised both nationally and internationally and is represented in the collections of Hawkesbury Regional Gallery, the University of Ulster, the British Consulate in New York and Washington (GAC), and on permanent display at the RACV Club in Melbourne.

Pennock exhibits regularly in Australia and is represented by Arthouse Gallery in Sydney, OTOMYS Contemporary Art in Melbourne and BMGArt in Adelaide. In 2019 his exhibition A Forgotten Traveller was shown by Arthouse Gallery at Sydney Contemporary Art Fair and in 2025, Pennock premiered a new work, Journey to Paradise, spanning 12 large panels in a solo exhibition at Noosa Regional Art Gallery. The process was documented in a short film by Simon Hewson for Arthouse Gallery.

Pennock became a member of the Chelsea Arts Club in 2025.

== Notes/further reading ==
- Journey to Paradise exhibition catalogue essay by Michael Brennan, Director, Noosa Regional Gallery (2025)
- about-place / about-face exhibition and short film interview with Colin Pennock by Kevin Wilson (2023)
- Space to Find Peace exhibition catalogue and essay by Michael Brennan, Director, Noosa Regional Gallery (2023)
- Episode 91 of the Talking with Painters Podcast with Maria Stoljar (May 2020)
- Kevin Wilson feature article, Artist Profile magazine, Issue 45 (2018)
- John Neylon, Slice and Dice, Adelaide Review (2014)
- Lucy Feagins interview with Pennock for the Design Files (2014)

== Awards and prizes ==
Pennock has been a finalist in several major Australian art prizes including the Fleurieu Art Prize (2004, 2008), Len Fox Painting Award (2016) and the Mosman Art Prize (2014, 2019). He was awarded the Allan Gamble Award at the Mosman Art Prize in 2005.
