= Nick Cater =

Australian journalist and author

- Born: Nicolas Charles Cater; Billericay, Essex, England
- Occupations: Journalist, columnist
- Employer: The Australian

Nicholas Charles Cater is a British-born Australian journalist and author who writes on culture and politics. He is known for his 2013 work of non-fiction, The Lucky Culture and the Rise of an Australian Ruling Class. He is a columnist for The Australian newspaper.

== Early life and education ==
Nicholas Charles Cater was born in Billericay, Essex, and grew up in Hythe near Southampton. His parents were teachers. He graduated from the University of Exeter with an honours degree in sociology in 1980 and drove laundry vans for a year before joining the BBC as a trainee studio manager.

== Career ==
He worked as a producer in the London bureau of Australia's Channel Seven from 1983 to 1986 before rejoining the BBC as a journalist. He produced and directed for the BBC the documentary Bridge Builders comparing the construction of the Tyne and Sydney Harbour Bridges.

Cater emigrated to Australia in July 1989, where he joined News Limited. He worked on The Advertiser in Adelaide and became group Asia correspondent in 1993, where he was best known for tracking down the paedophile Robert 'Dolly' Dunn, reported on the front page of The Daily Telegraph under the headline "Hello Dolly" on 17 April 1996.

Cater worked in senior editorial roles at The Daily Telegraph and The Sunday Telegraph in Sydney before joining The Australian in 2004. He was appointed editor of The Weekend Australian in 2007.

Cater left The Australian in September 2013, but continued to write a weekly column for it.

In 2014, Cater was appointed executive director of the Menzies Research Centre. where he was instrumental in founding the Robert Menzies Institute, a library, exhibition, and research institute dedicated to the legacy of former prime minister Sir Robert Menzies, housed in the University of Melbourne's Parkville campus. He co-curated of the institute's permanent exhibition with David Kemp.

As of June 2023 Cater is a regular commentator on Sky News Australia. He hosts the weekly show Battleground on ADH TV and co-hosts the weekly podcast Six O'Clock Swill with Tim Blair.

=== Defamation case ===
In 2015, the Wagner family, of Toowoomba, Queensland, sued him for defamation over comments he made in broadcasts and in print about the cause of the floods in that town in 2011, in which 12 people died. Justice Peter Flanagan dismissed the complaints against Cater relating to comments he made on radio, however The Spectator (Australia) settled out of court over comments Cater made in an article. In September 2019, a jury found that Cater had defamed the Wagners with comments he made in a television broadcast.

== Publications ==
=== The Lucky Culture ===
The Lucky Culture and the Rise of an Australian Ruling Class (2013) was described as a manifesto for a counter-revolution against the age of political correctness by Peter Coleman.

Two Australian prime ministers launched the book at separate events. John Howard endorsed the book in Sydney and it was given a qualified endorsement by Kevin Rudd in Brisbane two months later. The former Australian prime minister, Tony Abbott, praised the book. Among others who greeted the book favourably were former British prime minister Boris Johnson, Geoffrey Blainey, columnist Miranda Devine, historian Keith Windschuttle, Janet Albrechtsen, former Liberal Party politician Julie Bishop, and South Australian former Labor politician Jack Snelling. Chris Bowen and Peter Craven gave qualified endorsements.

The former Labor leader Mark Latham was among the book's leading critics, and former Labor speechwriter Bob Ellis called for the book to be pulped, calling it "loathsome". Other critics include the journalist Guy Rundle of Crikey and the historian Frank Bongiorno.

=== Other works ===
Cater was editor of the 2006 book, The Howard Factor, a review of the first decade of the John Howard government.

He co-edited with Helen Baxendale a selection of the writings of Christopher Pearson under the title A Better Class of Sunset (2014), with introductions by Tony Abbott and Jack Snelling.

Cater contributed the chapter "Barons versus bureaucrats: the history of the grain trade in North America and Australia" to Only in Australia. The History, Politics and Economics of Australian Exceptionalism (2016).

Cater co-authored The Road to Freedom: The Origins of Australia's Greatest Political Party (2019) with John Nethercote, and wrote the lead chapter in Australia Tomorrow (2022).

Non-profit organization positions
Preceded by Professor Donald Markwell	Executive director of Menzies Research Centre; Since 2014	Succeeded by incumbent
