= John Neylon =

South Australian writer and art critic

- Born: 1944 (age 81–82); South Australia
- Education: South Australian School of Art, South Australian College of Advanced Education
- Known for: art critic, Painting, Printmaking

John Neylon (born 1944) is a South Australian arts writer and arts educator as well as being an art critic, curator, painter, and printmaker. He is an art critic for The Adelaide Review, an author for Wakefield Press, and a lecturer in art history at Adelaide Central School of Art.

== Biography ==
John Neylon was born in 1944 in South Australia. He is an independent arts writer, critic, curator, painter, printmaker and arts educator in Adelaide, South Australia. He has a Diploma of Teaching (Visual Art) from the South Australian School of Art (1966), where he studied with Franz Kempf. He also has a Bachelor of Education from the South Australian College of Advanced Education (now University of South Australia) (1982).

From 1988 to 2005, he was Head of Education at the Art Gallery of South Australia and, since 2012, has lectured in art history at Adelaide Central School of Art. He became the inaugural art critic of The Adelaide Review in 1985 and continues to write for it.

He has curated exhibitions for the Adelaide Central School of Art, Flinders University Art Museum, Murray Bridge Regional Gallery, and Carrick Hill.

Neylon is an author who has written several books on Australian and South Australian artists including Robert Hannaford, Hans Heysen (co-authored with Jane Hylton), Greg Johns, Franz Kempf, Stephen Bowers (co-authored with Damon Moon) and Aldo Iacobelli, as well as contributing catalogue essays for many exhibitions. Neylon has also been on the judging panel for the Whyalla Art Prize (2011), and the Waterhouse Natural History Art Prize (2006).

Neylon has been described as one of Adelaide's longest-established art critics and as "penning well-considered, witty, vastly knowledgeable judgments on hundreds of exhibitions a year with sustained panache".

== Awards ==
In 2005, Neylon was awarded the Minister's Award for Excellence in Arts Education by the South Australian Department of Education. In 2014, he was the inaugural winner of the Lorne Sculpture Biennale Scarlett Award for critical writing.

== Bibliography ==
=== Books ===
- Annette Bezor: Hocus Pocus. Prahran, VIC: The Art Gallery, 1989 (about Adelaide artist Annette Bezor)
- Gerry King: Shadows and auras, works from the Cicatrix Series. Wollongong, NSW: Wollongong City Gallery, [Wollongong, N.S.W.], 1992
- Ed Douglas: The lure of unrealised desire. Underdale, SA: University of South Australia Art Museum, 1994
- Aldo Iacobelli: Two essays on the works to date of the artist. Kent Town, SA: Greenaway Art Gallery, 1994, with Richard Grayson
- Geoffrey Brown: Survey 1952–2000. Adelaide, SA: Greenhill Galleries, 2000
- Breakaway 01 : Year 12 visual arts showcase. Adelaide, SA: Art Gallery of South Australia, 2001
- Horizon: Greg Johns: sculptures, 1977–2002. South Yarra, VIC: Macmillan Art Publishing, South Yarra, 2002
- Open borders. McLaren Vale, SA: Fleurieu Peninsula Biennale Inc, 2004
- Hans Heysen: Into the light. Wakefield Press, Kent Town, South Australia, 2004, with Jane Hylton (about Hans Heysen)
- Ian Chandler. Kent Town, SA: Greenaway Art Gallery, 2004, with Stephanie Britton
- Deborah Paauwe: Magic window. Paddington, NSW: Sherman Galleries, 2005
- Mark Kimber: By the dawn's early light. Adelaide, SA: Greenaway Art Gallery, 2005
- Aldo Iacobelli: I love painting. Kent Town, SA: Wakefield Press, 2006
- Robert Hannaford: Natural eye. Kent Town, SA: Wakefield Press, 2007
- Gavin Blake: Introspection. Norwood, SA: Adelaide Central Gallery, 2008
- Dystopia: Portraits of the urban landscape. Norwood, SA: Adelaide Central School of Art, 2009
- Greg Johns: Landings. Armadale, VIC: Axia Modern Art, 2010
- Franz Kempf AM: Reflections. Murray Bridge, SA: Murray Bridge Regional Gallery, 2012
- Stephen Bowers: Beyond bravura. Kent Town, SA: Wakefield Press, 2013, with Damon Moon
- Tough(er) love: Art from Eyre Peninsula. Adelaide, SA: Flinders University Art Museum & City Gallery, 2013
- Franz Kempf: Thinking on paper. Adelaide, SA: State Library of South Australia Foundation, 2014
- Edge of time: Greg Johns sculptures 1977–2015. Mile End, SA: Wakefield Press, 2015
- Franz Kempf: Aspects of a journey 1947 – 2016. Mile End, SA: Wakefield Press, 2016
- Anything at all. Adelaide, SA: Adelaide Central School of Art, 2016
- Robert Hannaford. Adelaide, SA; Art Gallery of South Australia, 2016, with Sally Foster and Robert Dessaix
