= Menzies Institute =

Menzies Institute may refer to:

- Menzies Australia Institute, School of Global Affairs, King's College London, England
- Menzies Institute for Medical Research, University of Tasmania, Hobart, Australia
- Robert Menzies Institute, an library and museum dedicated to Sir Robert Menzies, University of Melbourne, Australia

== See also ==
- Robert Menzies#Eponyms of Menzies
