= George Winterton bibliography =

Publications by or about George Winterton, Australian legal scholar.

== Books ==
- Winterton, George (1983). Parliament, the Executive and the Governor-General : a constitutional analysis. Melbourne: Melbourne University Press.
- Winterton, G, Monarchy to Republic: Australian Republican Government, Oxford University Press, 1986 (rev ed, 1994).
- Lee, HP & Winterton, G (eds), Australian Constitutional Perspectives, Law Book Co., 1992.
- Winterton, G (ed), We, the People: Australian Republican Government, Allen & Unwin, 1994.
- Winterton, G, Judicial Remuneration in Australia, Australian Institute of Judicial Administration, 1995.
- Winterton, G, Lee, HP, Glass, A & Thomson, JA, Australian Federal Constitutional Law: Commentary and Materials, LBC, 1999.
- Lee, HP & Winterton, G (eds), Australian Constitutional Landmarks, Cambridge University Press, 2003.
- Winterton, G (ed), State Constitutional Landmarks, Federation Press, 2006.
- Winterton, G, Lee, HP, Glass, A & Thomson, JA, Australian Federal Constitutional Law: Commentary and Materials, 2nd ed., Lawbook Co., 2007.

== Monographs ==
- Winterton, G, The Resurrection of the Republic, Law and Policy Paper 15, Centre for International and Public Law, ANU (2001).

== Chapters in books ==
- Winterton, G, "An Australian Rights Council" in T Campbell, J Goldsworthy & A Stone (eds), Protecting Rights Without a Bill of Rights: Institutional Performance and Reform in Australia, Ashgate Publishing Limited: Aldershot, England (2006), 305–317.
- Winterton, G, "Australian States: Cinderellas No Longer?" in G Winterton (ed) State Constitutional Landmarks, The Federation Press: Sydney (2006), 1-20.
- Winterton, G, "The Evolving Role of the Australian Governor-General" in M Groves (ed), Law and Government in Australia, Federation Press (2005), 44–58.
- Winterton, G, "The High Court and Federalism: A Centenary Evaluation" in P Cane (ed), Centenary Essays for the High Court of Australia, LexisNexis Butterworths (2004), 197–220.
- Winterton, G, "A Model for Electing the Australian President" in W Hudson & A J Brown (eds), Restructuring Australia, Federation Press (2004), 124–139.
- Winterton, G, "The Communist Party Case" in HP Lee & G Winterton (eds), Australian Constitutional Landmarks, Cambridge University Press (2003), 108–144.
- Winterton, G, "1975: The Dismissal of the Whitlam Government" in HP Lee & G Winterton (eds), Australian Constitutional Landmarks, Cambridge University Press (2003), 229–261.
- Winterton, G, "The Acquisition of Independence" in R French, G Lindell & C Saunders (eds), Reflections on the Australian Constitution, Federation Press (2003), 31–50.
- Winterton, G, "The Role of the Governor" in C Macintyre & J Williams (eds), Peace, Order and Good Government, Wakefield Press (2003), 209–225.
- Winterton, G, "Presidential Powers under Direct Election" in J Warhurst & M Mackerras (eds), Constitutional Politics: The Republic Referendum and the Future, University of Queensland Press (2002), 227–236.
- Winterton, G, "Barwick, Garfield Edward John" in T Blackshield, M Coper & G Williams (eds), The Oxford Companion to the High Court of Australia, Oxford University Press (2001), 56–58.
- Winterton, G, "Remuneration of Justices" in T Blackshield, M Coper & G Williams (eds), The Oxford Companion to the High Court of Australia, Oxford University Press (2001), 596–598.
- Winterton, G, "Constitutional Convention 1998 and the Future of Constitutional Reform" in GA Moens (ed), Constitutional and International Law Perspectives, University of Queensland Press: Brisbane (2000), 151–164.
- Winterton, G, "A New Zealand Republic" in A Simpson (ed), The Constitutional Implications of MMP, Dunmore Press (1998), 204–231.
- Winterton, G, "Popular Sovereignty and Constitutional Continuity" in C Sampford & C-A Bois (eds), Sir Zelman Cowen: A Life in the Law, Federation Press (1997), 42–61.
- Winterton, G, "The President: Adapting to Popular Election" in M Coper & G Williams (eds), Power, Parliament and the People, Federation Press (1997), 23–41.
- Winterton, G, "Introduction" in WH Moore, The Constitution of the Commonwealth of Australia, Legal Books (reprint, 1997); (2nd ed, 1910), v-lxix.
- Winterton, G, "Constitutionally Entrenched Common Law Rights: Sacrificing Means to Ends?" in C Sampford & K Preston (eds), Interpreting Constitutions: Theories, Principles and Institutions, Federation Press (1996), 121–145.
- Winterton, G, "Limits to the Use of the Treaty Power" in P Alston & M Chiam (eds), Treaty-Making and Australia: Globalisation versus Sovereignty?, Federation Press (1995), 29–51.
- Winterton, G, "A Framework for Reforming the External Affairs Power" in Upholding the Australian Constitution, vol.5: Proceedings of the Fifth Conference of The Samuel Griffith Society, (1995), 17–46.
- Winterton, G, "The Separation of Judicial Power as an Implied Bill of Rights" in G Lindell (ed), Future Directions in Australian Constitutional Law, Federation Press (1994), 185–208.
- Winterton, G, "The Constitutional Implications of a Republic" in MA Stephenson & C Turner (eds), Australia: Republic or Monarchy?, University of Queensland Press (1994), 15–33.
- Winterton, G, "A Constitution for an Australian Republic" in G Winterton (ed), We, the People: Australian Republican Government, Allen & Unwin (1994), 1-37.
- Winterton, G, "A Republican Constitution" in G Winterton (ed), We, the People: Australian Republican Government, Allen & Unwin (1994), 38–48.
- Winterton, G, "The Constitutional Position of Australian State Governors" in HP Lee & G Winterton (eds), Australian Constitutional Perspectives, Law Book Co. (1992), 274–335.
- Winterton, G, "Dissolving the Communists: The Communist Party Case and its Significance" in Seeing Red: The Communist Party Dissolution Act and Referendum 1951: Lessons for Constitutional Reform, Evatt Foundation (1992), 133–178.

== Contribution to government reports ==
- Republic Advisory Committee, An Australian Republic: The Options (2 vols., AGPS, 1993).
- Constitutional Commission, Executive Government Advisory Committee, Report (AGPS, 1987).

== Articles ==
- Winterton, G, 'Who is our Head of State' (September 2004) Quadrant 60–63.
- Winterton, G, 'The Relationship Between Commonwealth Legislative and Executive Power' (2004) 25(1) Adelaide Law Review 21–50.
- Winterton, G, 'The Limits and Use of Executive Power by Government' (2003) 31 Federal Law Review 421–444.
- Winterton, G, 'The Evolving Role of the Governor-General' (March 2004) Quadrant 42–46.
- Winterton, G, 'The Hollingworth Experiment' (2003) 14 Public Law Review 139–147.
- Winterton, G, 'Justice Kirby's Coda in Durham' (2002) 13 Public Law Review 165–170.
- Winterton, G, 'Six Republican Models for Australia' (2001) 12 Public Law Review 241–245.
- Winterton, G, 'A Directly Elected President: Maximising Benefits and Minimising Risks' (2001) 3 University of Notre Dame Australia Law Review 27–44.
- Winterton, G, 'An Australian Rights Council' (2001) 24 University of New South Wales Law Journal 792–799.
- Winterton, G, 'Con Con 1998 and the Future of Constitutional Reform' (1999) 20 University of Queensland Law Journal 225–234.
- Winterton, G, 'Presidential Removal Under the Convention Model' (1999) 10 Public Law Review 58–64.
- Winterton, G, 'The 1998 Convention: A Reprise of 1898?' (1998) 21 University of New South Wales Law Journal 856–867.
- Winterton, G, 'Popular Sovereignty and Constitutional Continuity' (1998) 26 Federal Law Review 1–13.
- Winterton, G, 'Barwick the Judge' (1998) 21 University of New South Wales Law Journal 109–116.
- Winterton, G, 'Australia's Constitutional Convention 1998' (1998) 5 Agenda 97–109.
- Winterton, G, 'Should the High Court Consider Policy?' (1998) 57 Australian Journal of Public Administration 73–76.
- Winterton, G, 'An Australian Republic' (Summer 1998) NIRA Review 30–33.
- Winterton, G, 'A New Constitutional Preamble' (1997) 8 Public Law Review 186–194.
- Winterton, G, 'Barwick the Judge' (October 1997) Quadrant 25–29.
- Winterton, G, 'The States and the Republic: A Constitutional Accord?' (1995) 6 Public Law Review 107–130.
- Winterton, George (Dec 1995). "Constitutional reform". Quadrant. 39 (12): 51–52.
- Winterton, G, 'Choosing a Republican Head of State' (1995) 2 Agenda 135–147.
- Winterton, G, 'Presidential Reserve Powers in an Australian Republic' (1994) 8(2) Legislative Studies 47–55.
- Winterton, G, 'The Evolution of a Separate Australian Crown' (1993) 19 Monash University Law Review 1-22.
- Winterton, G, 'Presidential Power in Republican Australia' (1993) 28 Australian Journal of Political Science 40–55.
- Winterton, G, 'Reserve Powers in an Australian Republic' (1993) 12 University of Tasmania Law Review 249–262.
- Winterton, G, 'On the Road to the Republic' (1993) 1(2) Evatt Papers 45–54.
- Winterton, G, 'Tasmania's Hung Parliament' (1992) Public Law 423–451.
- Winterton, G, 'The Significance of the Communist Party Case' (1992) 18 Melbourne University Law Review 630–658.
- Winterton, G, 'Modern Republicanism' (1992) 6(2) Legislative Studies 24–26.
- Winterton, G, 'A Constitution for an Australian Republic' (March 1992) Independent Monthly, 15pp.
- Winterton, G, 'Formula for a Presidency' (March 1992) Independent Monthly.
- Winterton, G, 'An Australian Republic' (1988) 16 Melbourne University Law Review 466–481.
- Winterton, G, 'Judicial Ethics in Australia' (1988) 11 University of New South Wales Law Journal 220–227.
- Winterton, G, 'Constitutional Reform' (September 1988) Quadrant 20–23.
- Winterton, G, 'Judges as Royal Commissioners' (1987) 10 University of New South Wales Law Journal 108–126.
- Winterton, G, 'Appointment of Federal Judges in Australia' (1987) 16 Melbourne University Law Review 185–212.
- Winterton, G, 'Another Bicentenary: The Influence of the United States Constitution in Australia' (March 1988) Quadrant, 5–7.
- Winterton, G, 'Extra-Constitutional Notions in Australian Constitutional Law' (1986) 16 Federal Law Review 223–239.
- Winterton, G, "The Limits of Constitutional Law", in Law and Australian Legal Thinking in the 1980s: Australian Contributions to the 12th International Congress of Comparative Law (1986), 477–496.
- Winterton, G, 'Comment on Section 51(xx) of the Constitution' (1984) 14 Federal Law Review 258–265.
- Winterton, G, 'The Third Man: Sir Garfield Barwick' (April 1984) Quadrant 23–26.
- Winterton, G, 'Pre-Acquisition Imperial Statutes and the Repugnancy Doctrine' (1984) 14 Hong Kong Law Journal 67–71.
- Winterton, G, 'The Prerogative in Novel Situations' (1983) 99 Law Quarterly Review 407–411.
- Winterton, G, Opinion on Conventions Governing the Governor-General's Reserve Powers, Australian Constitutional Convention, 1983, 16 pp.
- Winterton, G, 'Section 51(xxxviii) of the Constitution and Amendment of the `Covering Clauses`' (1982) 5 University of New South Wales Law Journal 327–330.
- Winterton, G, 'The Act of Settlement and the Employment of Aliens' (1981) 12 Federal Law Review 212-235 (co-author).
- Winterton, G, 'Parliamentary Supremacy and the Judiciary' (1981) 97 Law Quarterly Review 265–274.
- Winterton, G, 'Comments on the Integration Debate in the United States' (1981) 18 Bulletin of the Australian Society of Legal Philosophy 40–47.
- Winterton, G, 'Can the Commonwealth Parliament Enact `Manner and Form' Legislation?' (1980) 11 Federal Law Review 167-202.
- Winterton, G, 'The Concept of Extra-Constitutional Executive Power in Domestic Affairs' (1979) 7 Hastings Constitutional Law Quarterly 1-46.
- Winterton, G, 'Is the House of Lords Immortal?' (1979) 95 Law Quarterly Review 386-392.
- Winterton, G, 'The British Grundnorm: Parliamentary Supremacy Re-examined' (1976) 92 Law Quarterly Review 591-617.
- Winterton, G, 'The Legal Regime of the Sea-Bed Under the New International Economic Order' (1976) 2 Columbia Journal of Environmental Law 399-412.
- Winterton, G, 'Comparative Law Teaching' (1975) 23 American Journal of Comparative Law 69-118.
- Winterton, G, 'Comparative Law in the Non-Western Nations: A Brief Survey' (1975) 12 UWA Law Review 48-63.
- Winterton, G, 'Consideration Provided by One of Two Joint Promisees' (1969) 47 Canadian Bar Review 493-505.
- Winterton, G, 'Is an Agreement to Agree Unenforceable?' (1969) 9 UWA Law Review 83-96.

== Additional publications ==
- "An Australian Judicial Remuneration Tribunal" (2005) 8 Constitutional Law and Policy Review 65–66.
- "Judges' Pay Mess Needs to be Sorted", The Australian, 14 October 2005.
- "Popular Sovereignty Requires Informed Voters" in Educating for Democracy: Constitution Education Fund Australia 2004/2005 Annual Report, 15–16.
- "The ACT Bill of Rights" (2004) 7 Constitutional Law and Policy Review 47–48.
- "Rights Code Test", Lawyers Weekly, 30 July 2004, 11.
- "The Centenary of the High Court" (2004) 6 Constitutional Law and Policy Review 82.
- "Once Distrusted by the Left, Now Mistrusted by the Right", The Australian, 8 October 2003.
- "Interviews by the Attorney-General in Appointing Judges" (2003) 5 Constitutional Law and Policy Review 68.
- "Lessons from the Hollingworth Affair", Democratic Audit of Australia, Australian National University (https://web.archive.org/web/20130513202332/http://democratic.audit.anu.edu.au/).
- "Lessons for the Learning from an Unhappy Affair", Sydney Morning Herald, 26 May 2003.
- "Echoes of 1975 as Holes in the Constitution are Exposed", Sydney Morning Herald, 14 May 2003.
- "No Room for Secrecy in Judicial Appointment Process", Weekend Australian Financial Review, 14–15 December 2002.
- "A crisis, but not of Kerr Proportions", The Australian, 25 February 2002.
- "Defending the Court", in Keeping the Show Together: The Federalism Forums 2001 (E. Thompson ed., January 2002), 52–53.
- "The New Republic", The Age, 12 July 2001.
- "No Cause for Open Comment", The Australian, 4 May 2001.
- "The Way Forward for Federalism", Australian Financial Review, 15 January 2001.
- "Rights of Passage", The Bulletin, 19 December 2000 – 2 January 2001, 42–43.
- "Voting for Change Will Create a Superior System", Australian Financial Review, 5 November 1999.
- "The President Dismisses the Prime Minister", "An Election Returns a Hung Parliament" and "The Senate Blocks the Budget", Weekend Australian, 30–31 October 1999.
- "Model Should Be Tested First With a Poll for Governor", Sydney Morning Herald, 26 October 1999.
- "A Feast of Possibilities", Weekend Australian, 9–10 October 1999.
- "Safety, Not Perfection, the Key Question", Weekend Australian, 7–8 August 1999.
- "A Popular Republic That Works", The Australian, 29 December 1997.
- "A Reply to McGarvie", Adelaide Review, November 1997, 16–17.
- "A Dilemma We Can't Dismiss", Weekend Australian, 15–16 November 1997.
- "Neither Fish nor Fowl" (review of T. Abbott, How to Win the Constitutional War), Adelaide Review, December 1997, 22–23.
- "The Election of an Australian President", in Poets, Presidents, People and Parliament: Republicanism and Other Issues (Papers on Parliament No. 28, Department of the Senate, Canberra, November 1996), 12–17, 21–22.
- "Murphy: A Maverick Reconsidered", The Australian, 21 October 1996, reprinted (1997) 20 University of New South Wales Law Journal 204–207.
- "State Charters Riddled with Omissions and Inconsistencies", The Australian, 29 March 1996.
- "Free Speech Rights and Voting Wrongs", The Age, 23 February 1996.
- "Constitutional Reform", Quadrant, December 1995, 51–52.
- "Sacking Highlights Dangers of Brinkmanship", Weekend Australian, 11–12 November 1995.
- "Matters for Argument" (Review of G. Barwick, A Radical Tory), The Age, 12 August 1995.
- "Some Reforms are Clearly Needed", Constitutional Centenary Foundation (Vic.) Newsletter, Winter 1995.
- "A Model President", Weekend Australian, 10–11 June 1995.
- "The Crucial Choice", Weekend Australian, 11–12 March 1995.
- "Fixed State Funding Should Guarantee Republican Dividend", The Australian, 20 September 1994.
- "The Power of the Covenant", The Australian, 29 August 1994 (co-author).
- "Education Vital to Machinery of Democracy", The Australian, 19 May 1994.
- "Change Must be Slow, Gradual", Weekend Australian, 9–10 October 1993.
- "Removing the Crown with Light Fingers", The Australian, 11 August 1993.
- "Binding a Republic and its Constitution", The Age, 1 May 1993.
- "How to Create the Republic of Australia", The Australian, 26 February 1993.
- "Lessons But No Scars from the Dismissal", The Australian, 1 April 1992.
- "President - and a Question of Power", Herald-Sun (Melbourne), 8 April 1992.
- "Choosing a President", Herald-Sun (Melbourne), 7 April 1992.
- "No Hereditary Barriers to Coming of Age in the Pacific", The Australian, 23 September 1991.
- Review of H. Evans, Constitutionalism and Party Government in Australia (1989) 59 Canberra Bulletin of Public Administration 109–110.
- Review of G. Marshall, Constitutional Conventions (1986) 102 Law Quarterly Review 337–341.
- Comment, in Restraining Leviathan: Small Government in Practice (1987), 331–333.
- "Local Government - Leave Well Alone", The Australian, 25 May 1988.
- "For Mitterrand, It's Almost Deja Vu", The Australian, 12 May 1988.
- "More Power to Canberra", The Age, 11 December 1986.
- "Caught in a Game of Regal Schizophrenia, the Queen Holds the Losing Cards", The Australian, 18 July 1986.
- "The Case for Tinkering with the Constitution", The Australian, 7 August 1985.
- "Australia's Bill of Rights", The Australian, 28 December 1984.
- "The Most Centralist High Court Since Federation", The Australian, 4 July 1983.
- "Settling the Powers of the Governor-General", The Age, 26 April 1983.
- "Sir Ninian: No Row Over Dissolution", The Age, 29 July 1982.

== Sources ==
- Library resources in your library and in other libraries by George Winterton
- Library resources in your library and in other libraries about George Winterton
