= Johnnie Dady =

South Australian artist and arts educator

- Born: Jonathan Dady; 1961 (age 63–64); United Kingdom
- Education: Maidstone College (UK), University of South Australia
- Known for: Installation art, Sculpture, Drawing
- Website: Personal website

Johnnie Dady is a South Australian artist and arts educator who specialises in installation art entailing sculpture and drawing.

== Biography ==
Johnnie Dady (also known as Johnny Dady and Jonathan Dady) was born in the UK in 1961 and migrated to Australia in 1987. He has a BA (Hons), Fine Art Sculpture, from Maidstone College in the United Kingdom and a Master of Visual Arts from the University of South Australia. He lectures in drawing and sculpture at Adelaide Central School of Art.

In 2013, his sculpture, The Fones at the University of Adelaide was vandalised.

He has also collaborated with fellow artist and lecturer Roy Ananda.

== Artistic style and subject ==
Dady is known for his installation pieces such as cardboard pianos. He is also known for large-scale drawings.

== Residencies ==
- Australia Council London studio residency 2001
- Australia Council Rome studio residency 2006
- Australia Council London Studio Residency 2009

== Major exhibitions ==
- 2012 Heysen Sculpture Biennial

== Collections ==
Dady's work is held in the following collections:

- Marion City Council
- University of Adelaide
