= VHHS =

VHHS may refer to several high schools in the United States of America:

- Verdugo Hills High School in Tujunga, Los Angeles, California
- Vernon Hills High School in Vernon Hills, Illinois
- Vestavia Hills High School in Vestavia Hills, Alabama

In Adelaide Australia:

- Victor Harbor High School on the South Coast, Victor Harbor
