= Word art =

Form of visual art incorporating text

Word art or text art is a form of art that includes text, forming words or phrases, as its main component; it is a combination of language and visual imagery.

== Overview ==
There are two main types of word art:

- One uses words or phrases because of their ideological meaning, their status as an icon, or their use in well-known advertising slogans; in this type, the content is of paramount importance, and is seen in some of the work of Barbara Kruger, On Kawara and Jenny Holzer's projection artwork called "For the City" (2005) in Manhattan.
- In the other kind of word art, as exemplified by the word paintings of Christopher Wool, text forms the actual artistic component of the work.

The style has been used since the 1950s by artists classified as postmodern, partly as a reaction to abstract art of the time. Word art has been used in painting, sculpture, lithography, screen-printing and projection mapping, and applied to T-shirts and other practical items. Artists often use words from sources such as advertising, political slogans and graphic design, and use them for various effects from serious to comical.

== Artists ==
Other artists whose work is known for using text include Jasper Johns, Robert Indiana, Shepard Fairey, Mel Bochner, Kay Rosen, Lawrence Weiner, Ed Ruscha and the collective Guerrilla Girls, whose work conveys political messages in the tradition of protest art. Australian artists include Abdul Abdullah, Kate Just, Anastasia Klose, Sue Kneebone, and Vernon Ah Kee.

== Exhibitions ==
A 2018 exhibition held simultaneously at Subliminal Projects (which was co-founded by Fairey) in Los Angeles and Faction Art Projects in New York featured the word art of Holzer, Ruscha, Guerrilla Girls and Betty Tompkins as well as younger artists like Ramsey Dau and Scott Albrecht.

Also in 2018, an exhibition called Word in the Hugo Mitchell Gallery in Adelaide, South Australia, featured the work of Just, Abdullah, Klose, Kneebone, Alice Lang, Richard Lewer, Sera Waters, and many others.

== See also ==
- Calligram
- Kinetic typography – animations involving moving text
- Micrography
- WordWorld - A TV show using word art as its main basis.
