= Daryl Austin =

Australian painter and educator (born 1964)

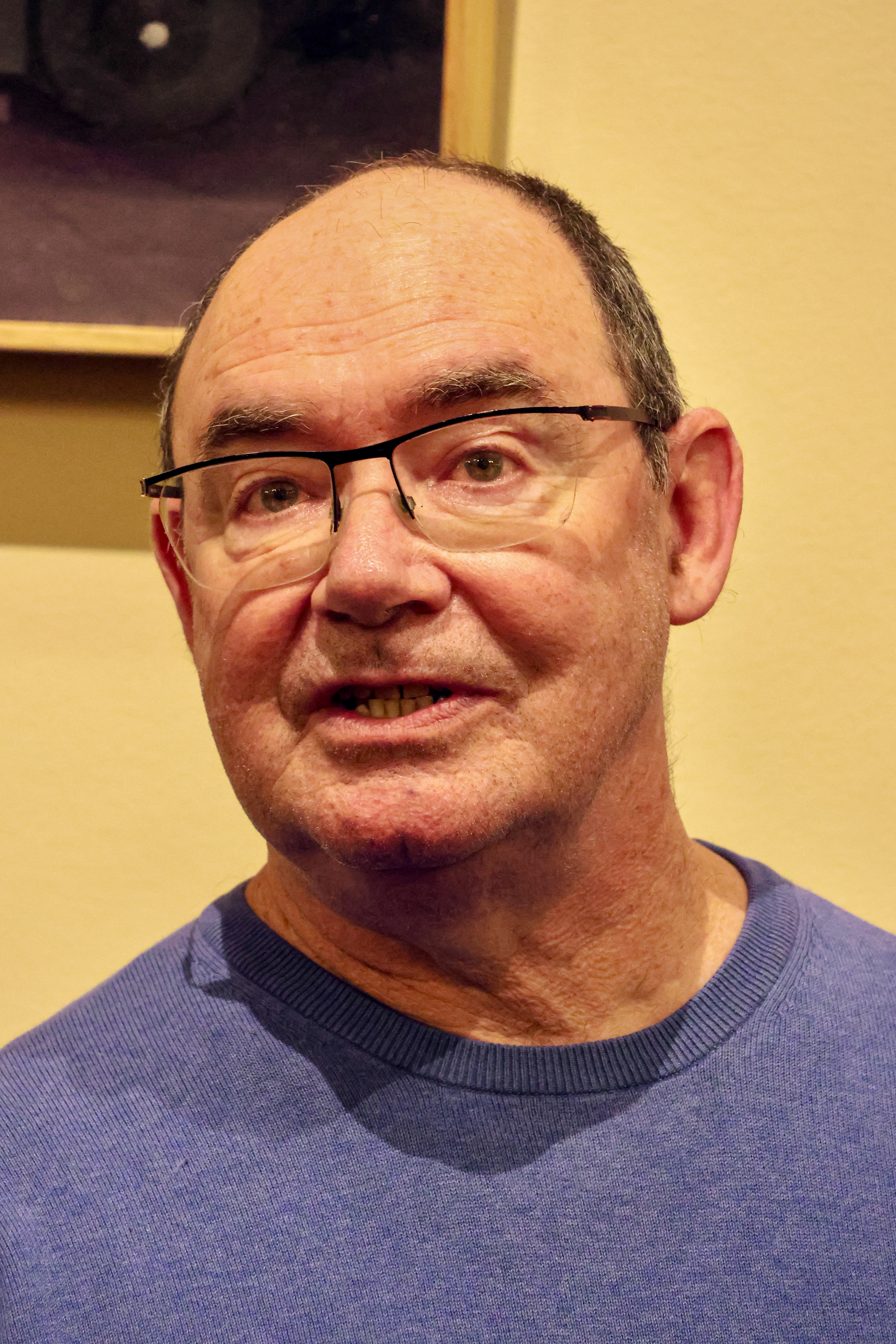
- Austin in 2026
- Born: Daryl Austin; 1964 (age 61–62); United Kingdom
- Education: South Australia College of Advanced Education
- Known for: Painting
- Awards: Heysen Landscape Prize 2018, City of Whyalla Art Prize 2002 and 1998
- Website: Personal website

Daryl Austin (born 1964) is an Australian painter and arts educator, best known for portraiture. He has won several art prizes, including the Heysen Landscape Prize in 2018 and the Whyalla Art Prize in 1998 and 2002.

== Biography ==
Daryl Austin was born in Lincoln in the UK in 1964. He earned a Bachelor of Arts from the South Australian College of Advanced Education (now the University of South Australia) in 1986. He has worked at the South Australian Museum and began teaching at Adelaide Central School of Art in 2001. His paintings are held in the Art Gallery of South Australia.

== Artistic style and subject ==
Austin is a realist painter best known for his portraiture and has undertaken commissions for the South Australian Parliament and the University of Adelaide. In recent years, he has experimented with fictional portraits based on vintage photographs.

== Awards/prizes/residencies ==
- Heysen Landscape Prize 2018
- Royal South Australian Society of Arts/SALA Festival Portrait Prize, Derivan Art Supplies Prize
- Royal South Australian Society of Arts Victor Zhang Portrait Prize 2015
- Whyalla Art Prize 2002
- Whyalla Art Prize 1998
- Finalist, Doug Moran Portrait Prize 2009 and 2011
- Finalist Doug Moran Portrait Prize 2001
- Selected for the Salon des Refusés in 2014.
