= Elizabeth Presa =

Australian visual artist, academic

Elizabeth Presa (born 1956) is an Australian visual artist and academic based in Melbourne.

Working with sculpture her work uses a range of materials and processes, including sericulture, apiculture and casting. Some of her installations use plaster as a forensic tool to examine traces of the psyche, biological life and the environment. She is an academic, an author and has also worked as a curator and gallery director.

Presa is the mother of Australian contemporary artist Anastasia Klose with whom she occasionally collaborates.

== Academic career ==
Presa studied at the Victorian College of the Arts of the University of Melbourne, graduating with a Diploma of Sculpture in 1977. She studied at the Phillip Institute, Post Graduate Sculpture, 1980, University of Melbourne; 1978, 83–85. She has a Masters in Critical Theory and Comparative Literature and a PhD in Critical Theory and Comparative Literature both undertaken at Monash University.

She tutored in art philosophy at Riverina College of Advanced Education during 1980–81, and as part of the Sculpture department of the Melbourne Centre for Adult Education from 1984 to 1985, and following this in the Sculpture department of the Victoria College Prahran.

From 1993 she taught in the School of Art at the Victorian College of the Arts, in 2003 she was appointed Head of the interdisciplinary Victorian College of the Arts Centre for Ideas, where she focussed on interdisciplinary curriculum and research design in the visual and performing arts. Additionally, she has been a visiting artist and guest lecturer at a number of international universities and has undertaken multiple international artist residencies. A notable fellowship Presa undertook was entitled "Interior Castle: St Teresa of Avila, architectures of space", at the Five College's Women's Research Centre, Mt Holyoke, Massachusetts.

== Curation ==
Presa was Director of Wagga Wagga Regional Gallery in 1978–79.

Her work as curator has involved three iterations of 'Do It' with Hans Ulrich Obrist, including a project with the Central Academy of Fine Arts, Beijing.

Her work on a series of beehive projects titled ‘Apian Utopias: Small Architecture for Bees’ involves projects and exhibitions in Tokyo, the US, Beijing, New Zealand and Australia. Her ongoing interest is in the interrelationship between philosophy and art.

== Selected exhibitions ==
Selected shows include

- Garden of small nuptials, sculpture installation for Aberrant Nuptials International Deleuze Studies conference, Orpheus Institute Ghent, Belgium, (2017)
- Of Martyrium and Reliquary, with Mireille Eid, Articulate Project Space, Gallery, Sydney (2017)
- Views for the Future Vol. 16 (bricolage), curator and master printer M. Matsumara, October, (2016) Gallery TEN, Tokyo-Yanaka
- Art Space Mooni, Morioka, Japan (2016/17)
- Animal/Human/Artist curated by Janine Burke, McClelland Gallery and Sculpture Park, Langwarrin, (2016)
- Lorne Sculpture Biennale, curated by Julie Collins, Lorne, Victoria, (2014)
- Gallery TEN, Tokyo-Yanaka; 2017 Art Space Mooni, Morioka, Japan, (2012)
- Interior Castle, with architect Gregory Burgess, Linden Contemporary Arts Centre, Melbourne, (2010)
- Dear Jean Jacques, Cite International des Arts, Paris (2007)
- Milk River, Meru Art Gallery, Brooklyn, New York (2002)
- The Four Horizons of the Page, Linden Gallery, Melbourne (2000)

== Selected reviews ==
- Eyeline Journal, Carol Schwarzman 'Presence and Non-Presence; Inside and Outside' (2017)
- Art+Australia, Review: Animal/Human/Artist –Art inspired animals', by Lynn Mowson, (2017)
- Human/Animals/Artist: Janine Burke’s Exhibition Explores the Lines Between', Gabriella Coslovich, the Sydney Morning Herald, Nov.18, (2016)
- Anne-Gaelle Saliot, The Drowned Muse, Oxford University Press, UK pp. 17–19, 326–328; (2015)
- Lisa Harms, Duetto review, Art Link Vol 30, No3 (2010)

== Selected works ==
- The Heart of the Matter (2018)
- Nothing (2018)
- Translation as a material practice (2017)
- Martyrium and Reliquary (2017)
- Birth to sartorial presence (2017)
- Garden of small nuptials (2017)
- human/animal/artist (2016)
- Bricolage (2016)
- Playland (2016)
- Nativity (2015)
- Life must first imitate matter (2015)
- Ways of Being: transitional objects and the work of art (2015)
- Small Utopias: architecture for bees – (beehive village) (2014)
- An Other Economy (2014)
- Apian Utopias: Small Architecture for Bees (Part 1: Tokyo Beehives) (2013)
- Echidna Body/Human Body (2013)
