= Christopher Pearson (journalist) =

Australian journalist and commentator

Christopher Pearson

Christopher Pearson (28 August 1951 – 7 June 2013) was an Australian journalist and conservative commentator who wrote for national broadsheet The Australian and who for many years before had edited a monthly cultural magazine, The Adelaide Review.

== Biography ==
Born in Sydney on 28 August 1951, Pearson spent most of his life in Adelaide. He received a Bachelor of Arts with Honours (third-class) from Flinders University as well as a Graduate Diploma in Education from the University of Adelaide. The topic of his honours thesis was Australian author Patrick White.

He had left-wing leanings as a student, before becoming an admirer of the social democratic politics of Bob Hawke and Paul Keating. He then moved to the right, voting for John Howard in 1996.

As proprietor of the Adelaide Review, he bought the name of the Wakefield Press from the South Australian government and operated the company from 1986 to 1988.

Pearson wrote occasional articles for a wide range of newspapers, including The Herald, The Age, and The Courier-Mail, through the 1980s and 1990s. He was a regular columnist for the Australian Financial Review between 1997 and 2001, before moving to the Weekend Australian. In this paper he wrote commentary and articles that covered a wide variety of cultural and religious matters pertaining to Australian society.

He was a member of the Council of the National Museum of Australia in 2005/6. He was also on the board of the government-owned SBS television station. He served as a speechwriter to Howard, who served as Prime Minister of Australia from 1996 to 2007, and was a close friend and mentor to another Prime Minister, Tony Abbott (2013–2015), whose books he also edited.

Pearson died in Adelaide on 7 June 2013. Tony Abbott was a pall-bearer at his burial.

== Works ==
While Pearson left a large footprint with regard to the publishing of other authors via Wakefield Press, he himself published no monographs. His most significant work is an essay, "The ambiguous business of coming out" (1996), which was published in Peter Coleman's collection called Double Take.

In a September 2009 piece in The Australian, Pearson wrote about how he reconciled his homosexuality with his Catholicism. He had converted to Catholicism in 1999, by which time he had committed to a life of chastity.

A selection of Pearson's writings, edited by Nick Cater and Helen Baxendale, was published in 2014 under the title A Better Class of Sunset, with introductions by Abbott and Jack Snelling, both of whom had previously written or spoken admiringly of his work.
