= Rob Gutteridge =

Australian artist and arts educator

- Born: 1954 (age 71–72); West Bromwich, England
- Education: South Australia School of Art, Adelaide Central School of Art, University of South Australia
- Known for: Painting, Drawing, écorché
- Website: Rob Gutteridge School of Classical Realism

Rob Gutteridge (born 1954) is a South Australian artist and arts educator. As well as teaching at Adelaide Central School of Art, Gutteridge runs the Rob Gutteridge School of Classical Realism.

== Biography ==
Gutteridge was born in West Bromwich, England in 1954 and arrived in Australia in 1965. He studied painting at the South Australian School of Art (now University of South Australia), and then worked as an illustrator, primarily of insects, for the South Australian Museum (1976-1979). In 1979, he received a travel grant from the Australia Council and a scholarship from the New York Studio School and, in 1992, thanks to another award, he studied at the Atelier Artistique Internationale des Artes in France. In 2011, he was awarded the Malaysia-Australia Visual Arts Residency, based at Rimbun Dahan. In 2016, he opened the Rob Gutteridge School of Classical Realism to teach classical realist techniques.

== Artistic style and subject ==
Gutteridge’s paintings and drawings have a strong focus on the human body and on clouds, using classical realist techniques. His work has been described as displaying “a keen appreciation of anatomy, structure and form”. He also practices and teaches écorché.

== Awards and Prizes ==
In 2016, he received a Highly Commended for a work in Monochrome award from the Society of Graphic Fine Art.
