= Adelaide Central School of Art =

Art school in Adelaide, Australia

Coordinates: 34°56′35″S 138°37′40″E

- Adelaide, South Australia; Australia

Information
- Established: 1982
- Website: www.acsa.sa.edu.au

Adelaide Central School of Art is an independent, not-for-profit, accredited higher education provider of tertiary courses in the visual arts, located in Glenside, Adelaide, Australia. The school, which was founded in 1982, offers degree courses as well as short courses, workshops and masterclasses.

== History ==
The school was founded in 1982 by Rod Taylor and Heather Nicholson. Initially occupying a rented space in Bloor Court, Adelaide city centre, it moved in 1988 to a warehouse in Gilles Street, establishing itself as an accredited independent art school.

In January 1994, the school moved to heritage buildings in Osmond Terrace, Norwood, leasing them from the school's founder until they were sold in 2011. Taylor retired in 2008 and was succeeded by Ingrid Kellenbach as CEO.

Adelaide Central School of Art relocated to the old Glenside Hospital site in January 2013, completing the first stage of the renovation of two iconic heritage buildings in May 2013. The South Australian Government granted the school a 50-year lease on these buildings, located adjacent to the Adelaide Studios, home of the South Australian Film Corporation, and related creative enterprises.

In September 2018, the school announced that Penny Griggs, director of the SALA Festival, would succeed Ingrid Kellenbach as the school's CEO in November 2018.

In January 2025, funding was provided by the Government of South Australia for the refurbishment of the Erindale building.

== Description ==
Adelaide Central School of Art is an independent, not-for-profit, accredited higher education provider of tertiary courses in the visual arts, located in Adelaide, Australia.

The new Glenside campus provides facilities in the three-storey teaching and studio building, including spaces for classes, integrated student studios, lecture room, media room, enlarged library facilities and display space for artwork on each level.

The school uses the atelier model of visual arts education.

The degree courses are designed to develop technical and conceptual skills. The curriculum includes the disciplines of drawing, painting, sculpture, art history and theory and contemporary studies, for part-time or full-time study.

== Campus ==
The School is located on the Glenside campus in two heritage buildings that formed part of the Glenside Hospital. The buildings were renovated by Adelaide-based architects Grieve Gillett in consultation with the School and the renovation received an award from the Australian Institute of Architects for Heritage Architecture in 2014.

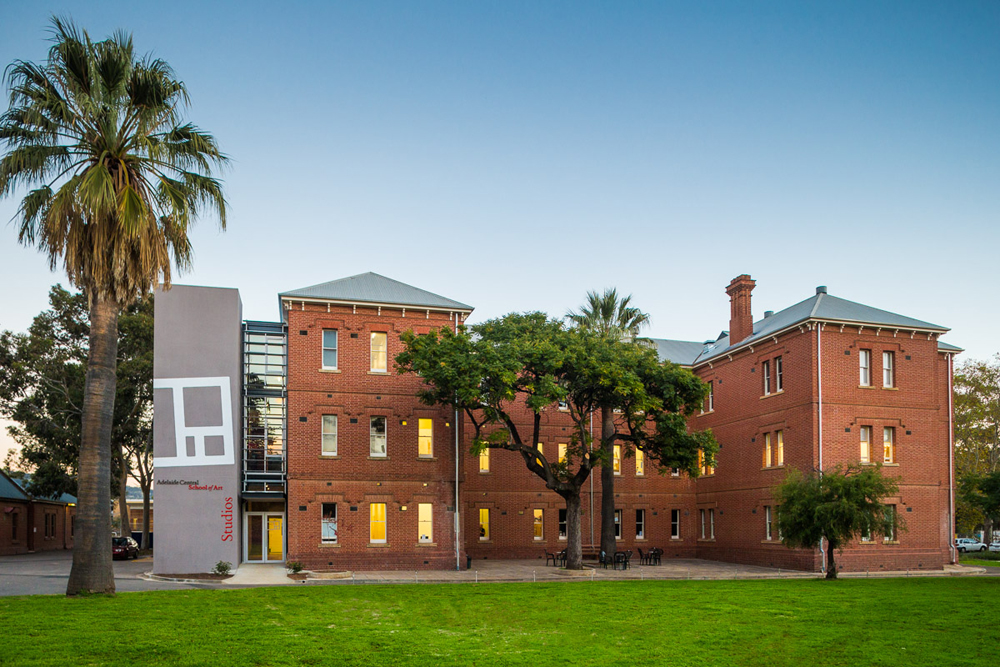
Teaching and Studio Building, Adelaide Central School of Art. Formerly the P&O Building (men's ward), Glenside Hospital

== Adelaide Central Gallery ==
The Adelaide Central Gallery was formally opened as part of the School in 1991. At threat of closure in 2002, a restructure in 2003 allowed the gallery to continue. The gallery has hosted two award-winning exhibitions: Façade received the 2018 Adelaide Fringe/BankSA Award for Best Visual Art & Design; and Home Stories received the 2011 Adelaide Fringe Eran Svigos Award for Best Visual Art & Design.

== Rankings ==
In the Quality Indicators for Learning and Teaching survey for 2017, the school was ranked the best art school in Australia for 2017 (second-best in 2016).

== Notable faculty ==
- Roy Ananda
- Daryl Austin
- Daniel Connell
- Johnnie Dady
- Andrew Dearman
- James Dodd
- Nicholas Folland
- Zoe Freney
- Geoff Gibbons
- Sasha Grbich
- Rob Gutteridge
- Sue Kneebone
- Monte Masi
- John Neylon
- Christopher Orchard
- Julia Robinson
- Sera Waters
