= Darren Siwes =

Darren Siwes (born 1968) is an Australian artist of Indigenous and Dutch descent. He was born in Adelaide, South Australia.

Siwes completed a Bachelor of Visual Arts (Hons), (1996) and a Graduate Diploma of Education (1997) at the University of South Australia.

Siwes has a unique style of photographing familiar South Australian landmarks, and using long exposure to reveal the ghostly figure of an Aboriginal man in a suit and tie onto the image. More recently he has used female figures in this same style. Siwes' work is political in this sense. He says he is inspired by contemporary Indigenous Australian artists such as Tracey Moffatt and Gordon Bennett, and is interested in exploring the possibilities of Aboriginal art in new forms and new media.

Siwes is represented by Greenaway Art Gallery in Adelaide and Nellie Castan Gallery in Melbourne.

== Awards ==
- 2002, Anne & Gordon Samstag International Visual Arts Scholarship

== Individual exhibitions ==
- 2001, Misperceptions, Greenaway Art Gallery, Adelaide, Nellie Caston Gallery, Melbourne
- 1997, Fall, Institute of Modern Art, Brisbane
- 1997, Horizon Scenes, University of California, Irvine Gallery, Los Angeles
- 1996, Castles in the Air, Metro Galleries, Brisbane
- 1996, Natural Alibis, Institute of Modern Art, Brisbane

== Selected group exhibitions ==
- 2001, ARCO (Arte Contemporáneo) World Art Fair, Madrid
- 2000, Across, Canberra School of Art Gallery, Canberra
- 2000, State of My Country: a survey of Contemporary Aboriginal Art, Hogarth Gallery, Sydney
- 2000, Chemistry, Art Gallery of South Australia, Adelaide
- 2000, Beyond the Pale: Adelaide Biennial of Contemporary Art, Art Gallery of South Australia, Adelaide
- 1999, Living Here & Now: Art & Politics, Australian Perspecta Exhibition, Art Gallery of New South Wales
- 1998, 15th National Aboriginal & Torres Strait Islander Art Awards, Museum and Art Gallery of the Northern Territory, Darwin, and touring
- 1998, Three Views of Kaurna Territory Now, Artspace, Adelaide Festival Centre, Adelaide
- 1996, Guddhabungan, Jabal Centre, Australian National University, Canberra

== Collections ==
- Art Gallery of South Australia
- Artbank
