= Anastasia Klose =

Australian artist (born 1978)

- Born: 1978 (age 47–48); Melbourne, Australia
- Education: Victorian College of the Arts in Melbourne.
- Known for: Contemporary art
- Movement: Video art, Performance art, Installation art

Anastasia Klose (born 1978) is an Australian contemporary artist. Her work has received much attention in the art world due to the personal nature of her subject matter, often putting herself in humiliating situations. She is a graduate of both the Victorian College of the Arts (VCA) and the University of Melbourne. She is also the daughter of artist and academic, Elizabeth Presa.

== Works ==
Klose's work largely comprises elements of video, performance and installation art. She is known for her lo-fi aesthetics with her use of iMovie editing software, generic fonts for text-based work and found objects such as cardboard or handwritten signage. The artist has also professed to drawing on the concepts of humiliation and embarrassment and has such her work has been likened to the antics of comedians such as Sacha Baron Cohen and the cast of Jackass.

In 2005, Klose filmed a video of herself engaging in sexual intercourse with a fellow art student in a disabled toilet at the VCA entitled In the toilets with Ben, and later the same year filmed Mum and I watch in the toilets with Ben, where Klose and her mother viewed the former video together sitting on a couch. The same year Klose filmed a video of herself being slapped hard in the face by a male friend.

In 2007, Klose was awarded the Prometheus Visual Arts Award by Brisbane's Institute of Modern Art Director, Robert Leonard for her Film for My Nanna. In the video the artist walks around the streets of Melbourne wearing a white wedding dress, with a cardboard sign around her neck which reads "Nanna I Am Still Alone!".

== Responses ==
The term "aesthetic of the pathetic" has been attributed to Klose's work. Conservative pundit and Herald Sun columnist Andrew Bolt said of Klose's work: "Only an artist could make sex films and still not find an audience", while referring to VCA art graduates in general as "unmistakable symptoms of culture sliding into vacuity, if not outright barbarity." In response, Klose made a film about Bolt. Australian Centre for Contemporary Art Director, Juliana Engberg however describes Klose as "an exceptional artist with a highly developed and sophisticated practice". Art critic, Natalie King of Australian Art Collector says Klose's works are "refreshingly candid, funny and earnest - leaving us smiling wryly." Robert Leonard and others have acquainted Klose's work with feminism. The Art Life described Klose as "Humorous, self-deprecating and self-aware", while in an interview with the South Australian Contemporary Art Centre publication Broadsheet, the artist was accused of nihilism, but she responded by saying her practice was a way of confronting depression rather than escaping it. The artist has also described herself as "an awful, ungrateful, spoiled brat of a woman".

== Acknowledgments ==
Klose's work has featured at the Australian Centre for Contemporary Art and the Biennale of Sydney She is represented by Tolarno Galleries in Melbourne, who represent other high-profile Australian artists such as Bill Henson and Patricia Piccinini. In 2008 Klose was listed in Australian Art Collector as one of "50 of Australia's Most Collectable Artists".

== See also ==
- Tracey Emin
- Australian Feminist Art Timeline
