= Christopher Orchard =

Australian artist and arts educator

- Born: Christopher Orchard; 1950 (age 75–76); South Australia
- Education: South Australia College of Advanced Education
- Known for: Drawing
- Awards: SALA Festival Featured Artist 2017
- Website: Personal website

Christopher Robin Orchard is a South Australian artist and arts educator who began as a sculptor but subsequently specialised in drawing. His character, the Bald Man, is a recurrent motif. Orchard is Associate Professor at Adelaide Central School of Art and was the subject of the 2017 SALA Festival monograph, Christopher Orchard: The Uncertainty of the Poet. He is also the subject of the 2013 short documentary film Everyperson, by Jasper Button and Patrick Zoerner.

== Biography ==
Orchard was born in South Australia in 1950. Orchard's full name is Christopher Robin Orchard. He completed an Advanced Diploma in fine Art, Sculpture and Painting at the South Australia College of Advanced Education. He is a founding member of the Art Workers’ Union in 1979 and joined Central Studios in 1982. From 1985-1987 he was a member of Air and Space Studios, London. He joined the teaching staff of Adelaide Central School of Art in 1989. In 2005, he was appointed Adjunct Associate Professor at Flinders University. Orchard held his first solo exhibition in Adelaide in 1975. In 1986, he presented his first British solo exhibition in London. In 2011, he presented his first American solo exhibition in New York.

== Artistic style and subject ==
Orchard began as a sculptor but came to specialise in drawing. His works feature an avatar known as the Bald Man who emerged from Orchard’s “fight with the figure” and who, according to Orchard, represents ”the entire history of what it means to be human”.

== Awards/Prizes/Residency ==
- 1985-1986: Berry Street Studios Residency
- 2000: Gunnery Space
- 2000: Finalist, Dobell Drawing Prize
- 2001: Finalist, Dobell Drawing Prize
- 2005: Finalist, Dobell Drawing Prize
- 2006: Finalist, Dobell Drawing Prize
- 2015: Invited Artist, Kedumba Drawing Award
- 2016: Finalist, Paul Guest Prize
- 2017: SALA Festival Featured Artist
