= Julia Robinson (artist) =

Australian artist (born 1981)

- Born: Julia Robinson; 1981 (age 44–45); Adelaide, South Australia
- Education: Adelaide Central School of Art
- Known for: Sculpture, Installation art
- Awards: SALA Festival/The Advertiser (Adelaide) Contemporary Art Prize, 2016
- Website: julia-robinson.net

Julia Robinson is an Australian artist and arts educator based in Adelaide, South Australia. She lectures at Adelaide Central School of Art and her work has been included in the Adelaide Biennial of Australian Art in 2016 and The National (New Australian Art) in 2019.

== Early life and education ==
Julia Robinson was born in Adelaide in 1981 and studied visual arts at Adelaide Central School of Art.

== Artistic style and subject ==
Robinson works in sculpture and installation art, using textiles and costuming techniques to produce her sculptures. She makes animal figures from scratch, using flywire, fabrics and other materials. Sex and death are major themes of her work and she draws her inspiration from folklore, mythology and the occult.

Her artwork, Beatrice, featured in the 2020 Adelaide Biennial of Australian Art and exhibited at the Museum of Economic Botany, is inspired by Scylla from Homer's The Odyssey and Nathaniel Hawthorne's short story, "Rappacini's Daughter".

== Career ==
Robninson lectures at Adelaide Central School of Art.

== Awards ==
- SALA Festival/The Advertiser (Adelaide) Contemporary Art Prize, 2016
- 2024 South Australian Living Artist Publication featured recipient.

== Major exhibitions ==
Robinson's work has been included in the Adelaide Biennial of Australian Art in 2016 and 2020 and The National (New Australian Art) in 2019.

- Adelaide Biennial of Australian Art 2020
- The National 2019
- Tamworth Textile Triennial 2017
- Adelaide Biennial of Australian Art 2014

== Collections ==
- Art Gallery of South Australia
- Museum of Contemporary Art Australia

== Personal life ==
Robinson married to fellow artist Roy Ananda.

== Publications ==
- Robb, Leigh, Robinson, Julia, & Coleman, Claire G. (2020). Monster Theatres: 2020. Art Gallery of South Australia, Adelaide.
- Jenkins, Susan, & Brown, Gillian. (2015). Do It [Adelaide]: 13 February – 25 April 2015. Anne & Gordon Samstag Museum of Art, University of South Australia, Adelaide SA.
- Parker Philip, Isobel, Cunningham, Daniel Mudie, Bullen, Clothilde, & Davis, Anna.(2019). The National 2019: new Australian art. Art Gallery of New South Wales, Carriageworks, $ Museum of Contemporary Art Australia, Sydney, N.S.W.
- Robinson, Julia, MacDonald, Logan, & Slade, Lisa. (2015). One to rot and one to grow. Parkside, SA Contemporary Art Centre of South Australia.
- Mitzevich, Nick. (2014). Dark heart. Art Gallery of South Australia, Adelaide, South Australia.
- Robinson, Julia, & Ananda, Roy. (2004). Primavera 2004: exhibition by young Australian artists. Museum of Contemporary Art, Sydney.
- Robinson, Julia, Ananda, Roy, & Butterworth, Heather. (2004). Thousand-fold: Julia Robinson and Roy Ananda. [South Australia] [publisher not identified].
