= Geoff Gibbons =

Australian artist and arts educator

- Born: Geoffrey T. Gibbons; 1947 (age 78–79); Adelaide, South Australia
- Education: Flinders University, University of South Australia
- Known for: Printmaking, Watercolor, Drawing
- Website: website

Geoff Gibbons is a South Australian artist, printmaker, and arts educator. He is a founder of Bittondi Printmakers Association and a lecturer at Adelaide Central School of Art.

== Biography ==
Geoff Gibbons was born in 1947 in Adelaide, South Australia. He has a Bachelor of Arts (Honours) in art history from Flinders University, a Bachelor of Education (Art teacher) from the University of South Australia, and a Master in Visual Arts from the University of South Australia (ref: thesis). He wrote his master’s thesis on English artist, Samuel Palmer. He has been influential in South Australian printmaking, both as a lecturer in printmaking and setting up printmaking studios, with some of his students establishing the informal Aldgate Print Group. He subsequently helped to establish the Bittondi Printmakers Association in 2008. Gibbons taught at TAFE SA and then Adelaide Central School of Art, which closed its printmaking studio upon its relocation to Glenside.

== Artistic Style and Subject ==
Gibbons specialises in printmaking and is deeply interested in the history of printmaking, particularly within different cultural traditions. This has led to residencies in China and Italy.

== Collections ==
- British Museum: Geoff Gibbons

== Bibliography ==
- Gibbons, Geoff. 2019. 'Mysterious wisdom won by toil': the etchings of Samuel Palmer. In Kerrianne Stone (Ed.), Horizon lines: Marking 50 years of print scholarship. University of Melbourne Library, University of Melbourne, Melbourne, Victoria.Worldcat record
- Gibbons, Geoff. His mortal eye: Stanley Spencer at Carrick Hill. Art Monthly Australasia, No. 291, Aug 2016: 26-28.
- Gibbons, Geoffrey T (2001). Visions of Eden: a study of pastoral values in the writings and art of Samuel Palmer. Thesis. University of South Australia.
