= Sasha Grbich =

Australian installation artist

- Born: Sasha Grbich; South Australia
- Education: Adelaide Central School of Art, Flinders University, University of South Australia
- Known for: installation art
- Awards: Samstag Scholarship
- Website: Personal website

Sasha Grbich (/ˈɡɜːrbɪk/ GUR-bik) is an Australian installation artist, arts writer and arts educator. She is a 2018 Samstag Scholar and lectures at Adelaide Central School of Art.

== Biography ==
Grbich graduated from the Adelaide Central School of Art in 2003 with a Bachelor of Visual Arts (Hons), and received a Bachelor of Arts (Major in Screen Studies, Minor in Italian) in 2004 from Flinders University. She received a Master of Arts from the University of South Australia in 2015, where she wrote her thesis on social art making. In 2011, she was a producer for ABC Open. Since 2012, she has lectured at Adelaide Central School of Art.

== Artistic style and subject ==
Grbich is an installation artist who uses sound and film to explore the world around us. Curator Andrew Purvis describes her work as interacting with audiences and local environments to create artistic experiences. She prefers to highlight other people's voices in her work, as in her work, Small Measures, which was recorded in Auckland and entailed many local people including Auckland's Oceanian Choir.

== Awards/Prizes/Residency ==
In 2018, she was awarded a Samstag Scholarship.

== Bibliography ==
- Grbich, Sasha. (2015). Performative encounters : making conversations with local worlds [Thesis] Adelaide, SA: University of South Australia.
- Grbich, Sasha. (2015). Making Encounters: Witnessing the sociality of things and places, ACUADS Conference 2015.
- Grbich, Sasha. (2014). Broadcasts From Empty Rooms and the Edges of Radio. Invisible Places Conference, Portugal, 2014.
