= Andrew Dearman =

Australian photographer

- Born: South Australia
- Education: University of South Australia
- Known for: Photography
- Website: unclewadu.blogspot.com

Andrew Dearman is a South Australian photographer and arts educator, known for his work with vintage cameras and vintage photographic methods such as tintypes and ambrotypes. He frequently conducts workshops and demonstrations into historical photographic techniques.

== Early life and education ==
Andrew Dearman's 2008 doctoral thesis is titled "Art Practice and Governmentality: The Role Modelling Effects of Contemporary Art Practice and its Institutions", which earned him a PhD from the University of South Australia.

== Career ==
Dearman, who is based in Adelaide, is known for his work with vintage cameras and vintage photographic methods such as tintypes and ambrotypes. He frequently conducts workshops and demonstrations into historical photographic techniques.

He also conducts academic research into analogue photography and contemporary art, which he sees as forming part of his art practice. He lectures at Adelaide Central School of Art.

=== Artistic style and subject ===
Although Dearman began as sculptor, he moved into photography, and started to use vintage and antique cameras and vintage photographic techniques, along with found photographs and films to create his artworks. Dearman makes cameras and has also built a portable darkroom (dubbed the ‘Beasty’).

== Selected works ==
- 2004/5. A Box of Tea.
- 2008. "Art practice and governmentality: the role modelling effects of contemporary art practice and its institutions"
- 2008. "Rosencrantz & Guildenstern Are Dead". Performing disjunct memory through an early 20th century Danish family photo album—in early 21st century South Australia.
- 2011. Working (with) the Dead: Agency and its Absence in the Use of the Found Image.
- 2016. "The Green Room: Nazia Ejaz"
