= Nicholas Folland =

Australian artist

- Born: Nicholas Folland; 1967 (age 58–59); Adelaide, South Australia, Australia
- Education: South Australian School of Art, University of South Australia, Sydney College of the Arts, University of Sydney
- Known for: Sculpture
- Awards: Samstag Scholar, 1999, SALA Festival Featured Artist 2014
- Website: http://nicholasfolland.com/

Nicholas (Nic) Folland (born 1967) is an Australian artist and arts educator based in South Australia.

== Early life and education ==
Nicholas Folland was born in Adelaide, South Australia, in 1967.

He spent two years doing a Bachelor of Design course at the South Australian College of Advanced Education in 1985 to 1986, later undertaking and graduating with a Bachelor of Visual Arts (Honours) from the South Australian School of Art, University of South Australia (UniSA) in 1998.

Later, he returned to study and received a Masters of Visual Arts from the Sydney College of the Arts at the University of Sydney in 2009.

== Career ==
As of 2018 he is head of contemporary studies and sculpture at Adelaide Central School of Art.

== Artistic style and subject ==
Folland uses found objects such as knives, trophies, furniture, crystalware, and taxidermied animals to create sculpture and mixed media artworks. An example of his work in the Museum of Contemporary Art Australia in Sydney, The door was open… (2006), features a chandelier with a refrigerator coil that creates a sphere of ice in the centre of the chandelier.

== Exhibitions ==
The Microscope Project was an exhibition developed by Flinders University Art Museum in 2014, which included work by South Australian artists Folland, Ian Gibbins, Deb Jones, Catherine Truman, and Angela Valamanesh, as well as writer and artist Melinda Rackham. Emeritus professor Ian Gibbins was a neuroscientist, and Catherine Truman had worked with him as an artist-in-residence. The idea was to repurpose decommissioned scientific equipment and repurpose it into artworks. The exhibition, curated by Fiona Salmon and Maddie Reece, was installed at Flinders University's City Gallery, included sculpture, installation, moving image, sound, photography, and text.

== Recognition and awards ==
In 1997, Folland won the Annual Art Purchase Prize at UniSA.

In 1999, he was awarded the Anne & Gordon Samstag International Visual Arts Scholarship, which enabled him to join the research program work at the Piet Zwart Institute and the Public Art Observatory in Barcelona, Spain.

Folland is the subject of the 2014 SALA Festival monograph, Nicholas Folland.

== Collections ==
Folland's work is held in the following collections:

- Art Gallery of South Australia
- Museum of Contemporary Art
- National Gallery of Victoria
