= Sue Kneebone =

Australian artist

- Born: 1963 (age 62–63)
- Education: Victorian College of the Arts, University of South Australia
- Known for: Ceramics, Assemblage, Photomontage
- Awards: Qantas Contemporary Art Award (2011)
- Website: suekneebone.com

Sue Kneebone (born 1963) is an Adelaide-based artist and arts educator who lectures at Adelaide Central School of Art.

== Biography ==
Sue Kneebone was born in 1963. She has a Bachelor of Fine Art (Hons) (1998) and a Masters in Fine Arts (2000) from Victorian College of the Arts (2000) as well as a PhD from the University of South Australia (2010).

She has held exhibitions in Australia and the Republic of Ireland, and in 2014 featured in Episode 2 of Hannah Gadsby's three-part series on Australian art, Oz.

== Work ==
Kneebone began as a ceramicist but expanded her art practice to include photomontage and other mixed media. Through her ceramics, photomontages and assemblages, she explores questions of cultural identity through her own family history, as well as the impact of empire on the Australian landscape. She has been described as combining “a hypnotic storyteller with the backbone of an archaeologist”.

She uses text in her work to create word art, which featured in a 2018 exhibition of word art in the Hugo Mitchell Gallery in Adelaide.

== Awards and recognition ==
Kneebone was the South Australian recipient of the Qantas Foundation Contemporary Art Travel Award in 2011.

== Collections ==
Kneebone's works are held in the collection of the Art Gallery of South Australia.
