= Monte Masi =

Australian artist (born 1983)

- Born: Monte Leo Lawton-Masi; 1983 (age 42–43); Adelaide, South Australia, Australia
- Education: University of South Australia, California College of the Arts
- Known for: Performance art, Video art
- Awards: Samstag Scholar
- Website: Personal website

Monte Masi is a South Australian artist, curator and arts educator.

== Biography ==
Monte Masi was born in Adelaide in 1983 and is a performance-based video artist. (Samstag page) He has a Bachelor of Visual Art (Hons) and a Master of Visual Art from the University of South Australia (MA Thesis) and a Master of Fine Art (Social Practice) from the California College of the Arts. He lectures at Adelaide Central School of Art and was a founding member of the artist-run initiative FeltSpace. He has exhibited in Australia and the United States.

== Artistic style and subject ==
Masi works in the field of performance-based video art. His videos feature him in the “roles of critic, curator, fan and artist simultaneously, questioning how these operate within contemporary art and the complementary and problematic aspects of each”. His artworks can be viewed on Vimeo.

== Awards/Prizes/Residencies ==
Masi was awarded a Samstag Scholarship in 2012.
