= Roy Ananda =

Australian artist and arts educator

- Born: Roy Ananda; 1980 (age 45–46); South Australia
- Education: Adelaide Central School of Art, University of South Australia
- Known for: Sculpture, Drawing
- Awards: Qantas Foundation Art Award (SA) 2010, South Australian Living Artists Festival Publication 2021

Roy Ananda is a South Australian artist and arts educator. He is Head of Drawing at Adelaide Central School of Art.

== Biography ==
Roy Ananda was born in Adelaide, South Australia, in 1980. He has a Bachelor of Visual Arts (Honours) from Adelaide Central School of Art and a Master of Arts from the University of South Australia. Ananda was the South Australian recipient of the Qantas Foundation Art Award in 2010. His work has featured in the 2012 Heysen Sculpture Biennial and the 2018 Adelaide Biennial of Australian Art.

Portraits of Ananda by Deidre But-Husaim have been finalists in the 2011 Archibald Prize and the 2011 Doug Moran Portrait Prize.

Ananda was awarded the South Australian Living Artist Festival Publication in 2021.

Ananda is married to artist Julia Robinson.

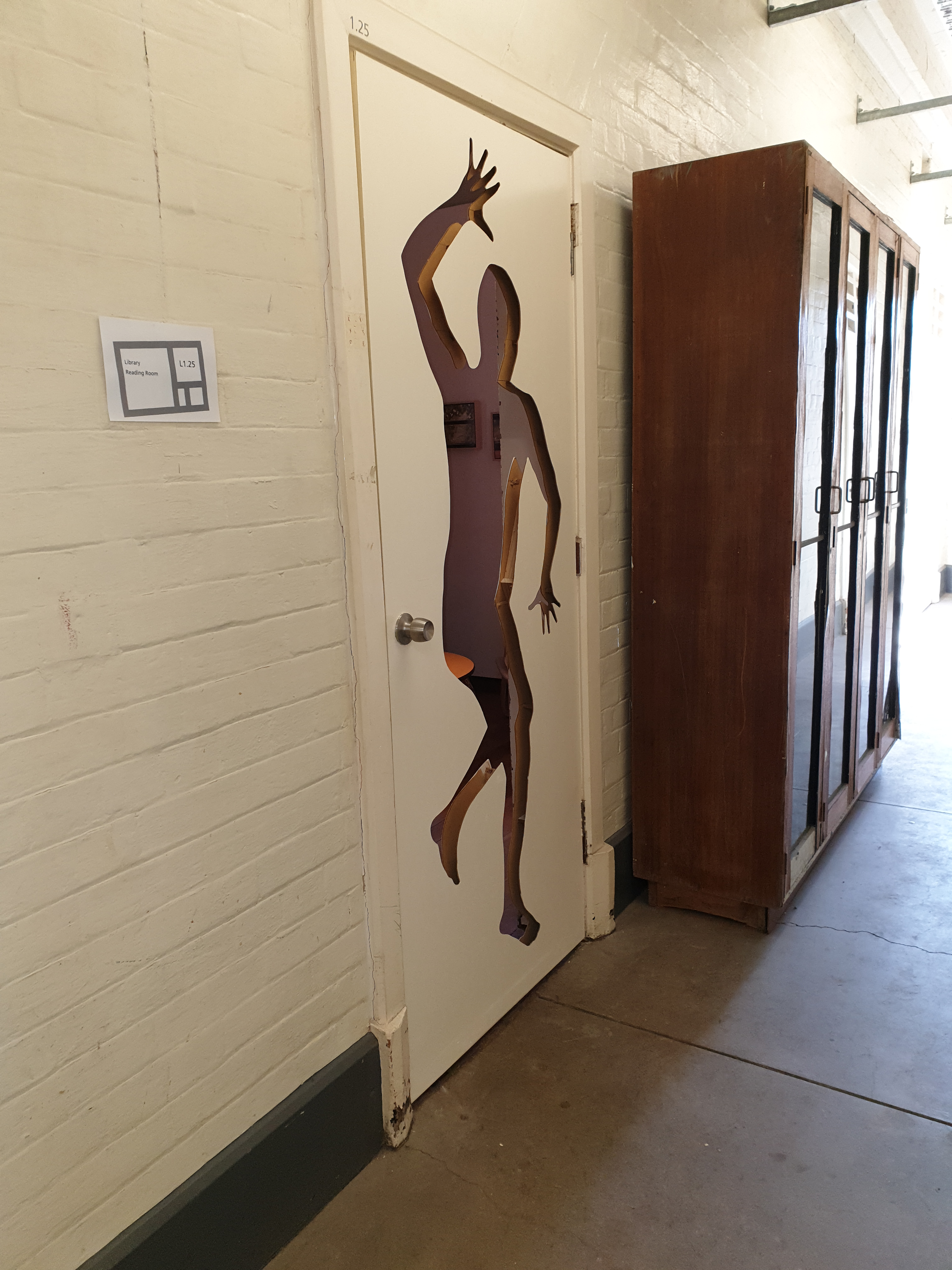
Untitled, by Roy Ananda

== Artistic style and subject ==
Ananda is known for his large-scale sculptures and drawings referencing fandom and pop culture. Slow Crawl into Infinity recreated the opening words of Star Wars as a large-scale sculpture at the Samstag Museum in 2014.
