= Kay Rosen =

American painter (born 1943)

Kay Rosen (born 1943, Corpus Christi, TX) is an American painter. Rosen's paintings are included in the collections of the Art Institute of Chicago, the Museum of Contemporary Art, Los Angeles, and the Museum of Modern Art, Whitney Museum of American Art in New York City, and The Blanton Museum of Art in Austin, Texas. Rosen lives in Gary, Indiana, and New York City.

== Education ==
Rosen received her BA in Linguistics, Spanish, and French from Newcomb College of Tulane University in 1965. She attended graduate school in Linguistics and Spanish at Northwestern University, and then taught Spanish at Indiana University in Gary. While she was teaching in Gary (Indiana), Rosen began taking studio art courses at the School of the Art Institute of Chicago, where she currently teaches.

== Works ==
Rosen's artwork is largely text-based, employing "formalism, linguistics, and humor to reveal content that is hidden within both the structural nature of written language and the ways in which meaning can be generated through the manipulation of text." Rosen is interested in expressing language visually, and ss focuses primarily on wordplay. Many of her works are representations of words in which certain letters have been juxtaposed or rendered in different colors or scales in order to reveal hidden messages or to draw attention to the relationship between language and meaning. These features of Rosen's style, known as word art can be seen in Untitled Grid at the Indianapolis Museum of Art and in The Whitney Museum of American Art's Spare Parts.

In some works, language becomes structure, "with words and letter-forms functioning as building blocks, and where, through unusual typographic arrangements, words and phrases can embody the thing they are describing". Her precisionist-style works span in size from mural- to laptop-sized. Rosen's work frequently veers into commentary on the U.S. political condition, often deploying wit and humor.

== Exhibitions ==
In addition to works created for gallery spaces, Rosen is known for publicly presenting work in the form of outdoor murals. The piece "Blurred" was exhibited along Interstate 70 as a part of the I-70 Sign Show. It was first located near Hatton, Missouri then moved to Warrenton, Missouri. The blurring of colors in text were interpreted as a statement related to political divides between Missouri's rural and urban populations. Blurred (2004) and IOU (2017) were purchased to the collection at the Art Gallery of New South Wales.

== Awards ==
- Artist Award for a Distinguished Body of Work, presented by the CAA College Art Association, 2014
