= Glenside Hospital (Adelaide) =

Coordinates: 34.943°S 138.625°E

- SA Health

Geography
- Location: 2 Karrayarta Drive, Glenside, South Australia, Australia

Organisation
- Care system: Medicare (Australia)
- Type: Specialist

Services
- Emergency department: No
- Beds: 119
- Speciality: Mental Health

History
- Opened: 1870

Glenside Hospital, as it was known from 1967, previously the Public Colonial Lunatic Asylum of South Australia, Parkside Lunatic Asylum and Parkside Mental Hospital, was a complex of buildings used as a psychiatric hospital in Glenside, South Australia. Since the 1970s the original site has been subdivided and parcels of land sold off, largely for housing. The large administration building fronting the side was refurbished to house the Adelaide Studios of the South Australian Film Corporation in 2011, and the old P&O Ward now houses Adelaide Central School of Art. The site is sometimes referred to as "the old Glenside Hospital", the "Glenside Hospital historical precinct" or "Glenside Campus". A new building houses Glenside Health Services at the southern end of the site, along with new wards and facilities.

== History of the hospital ==
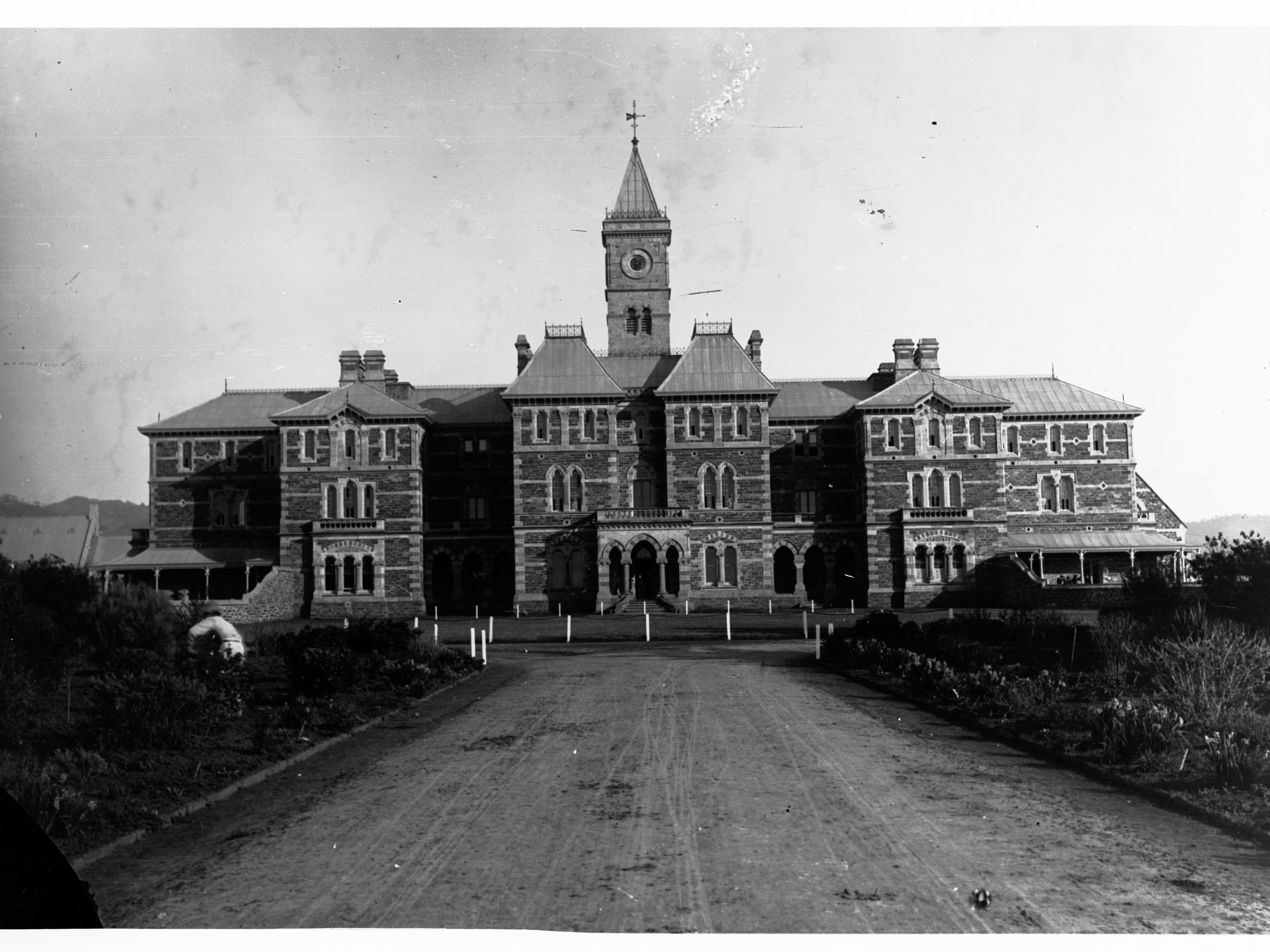
Parkside Mental Hospital, ca. 1925

The Public Colonial Lunatic Asylum of South Australia was founded at the site in 1846 as the state's first purpose-run asylum to house residents deemed mentally ill. It was run more like a farm than a hospital, and housed patients deemed too mentally unwell to be housed in the Adelaide Gaol. It operated until 1852, when the Adelaide Lunatic Asylum opened on the eastern side of the old Royal Adelaide Hospital (now Lot Fourteen), on land now part of the Adelaide Botanic Garden, and the Glenside site was not used for such purposes for another 18 years.

It reopened as Parkside Lunatic Asylum in 1870, housing the chronically mentally ill as well as people nearing the end of their lives, those suffering from undiagnosed illnesses, unmarried women with children and prostitutes. The morgue for the asylum was a building in the Adelaide Botanic Garden.

The institution was renamed Parkside Mental Hospital in 1913 at the time of changes in the Mental Health Act 1913, when it was classified as both a receiving and a mental hospital. The large administration building became the receiving hospital and the other buildings were used for long-term patients. The infamous "Z Ward" housed the criminally and mentally insane. Parkside was also referred to as "The Bin".

Erindale Secure Ward for Males, a lower security unit than the Z Ward, was built in 1877 and The Elms in 1880 to house female patients, although later used for elderly men, then as a Domestic Training Unit and for Music Therapy.

Residency of Parkside Lunatic Asylum peaked at 1,769 in 1958. The facility was renamed Glenside Hospital in 1967.

From the 1970s onwards, with falling numbers and changing methods of treatment, the original site was progressively sold off, largely for housing, and some of the historic buildings refurbished for use by organisations such as SA Health, PIRSA, and ArtsSA.

== Current mental health facilities ==
In 2012, Stage 1 of a series of a transformation of the old facilities, with an Inpatient Rehabilitation Unit, Helen Mayo House and Shared Activities Centre (SHAC) housing up to 46 patients was completed. In total, the facilities were planned to include 129 individual living units, plus 20 supported accommodation units and a 15-bed intermediate care centre. The new buildings were opened in 2013.

Stage 2 included the construction of Acute Care Inpatient Services, Rural and Remote Services, Drug and Alcohol Services of South Australia, and the Administration and Learning Services building. Glenside Health Services was built at the southern end of the site in 2013, along with new facilities. The centre opened with 129 beds, but the emphasis had shifted to more care provided at home and in the community, with only acute cases admitted to the facility for short periods. The former intermediate care centre became part of a new centre called the Jamie Larcombe Centre, providing mental health and Post-Traumatic Stress Disorder (PTSD) services to veterans. The centre sits adjacent to Glenside Health Services and is governed by the Southern Adelaide Local Health Network.

In May 2019, an independent review conducted by two interstate experts and a representative of the Chief Psychiatrist's office found “attitudes and practices that are not in line with contemporary thinking” were prevalent in the ten-year-old 40-bed Inpatient Rehabilitation Service (IRS), as well as a building design unsuitable for longer-term residents. Intensive monitoring would continue until standards were met.

In July 2019 it was announced that ten new forensic mental health beds had opened a dedicated Forensic Sub-Acute Unit at Glenside Health Services named Tarnanthi. A model of care specific to the facility had been developed and the state's Chief Psychiatrist, John Brayley, had approved the facility.

== Other uses of the site ==
Apart from extensive new housing developments, various organisations have occupied some of the refurbished historic buildings.

The main administration building has housed the South Australian Film Corporation since 2011.

Also on the site is the Adelaide Central School of Art, which moved there in 2013 from Norwood. The first building they occupied was the former P&O ward, built in 1899 as part of Glenside Hospital, a three-storey heritage building. Two smaller buildings, the Chapel and Erindale, would be occupied after renovation. Funding was provided by the Government of South Australia for the refurbishment of the Erindale building in January 2025.
