= Sera Waters =

Australian textile artist

- Born: 1979 (age 46–47); Murray Bridge, South Australia
- Education: University of South Australia, University of Adelaide
- Known for: Textile arts, embroidery, blackwork
- Awards: Heysen Prize for Landscape 2016
- Website: serawaters.com.au

Sera Waters is an Australian textile artist, arts writer, and arts educator. She lectures at Adelaide Central School of Art in Adelaide, South Australia.

== Early life ==
Sera Waters was born in Murray Bridge, South Australia, in 1979.

She received a Bachelor of Visual Arts (Hons) from the University of South Australia in 2000. In 2005 she was awarded the Ruth Tuck Scholarship for Visual Arts, and used it to undertake study at the Royal School of Needlework in the UK.

She then went on to earn a Masters of Visual Arts from the University of Adelaide in 2006, and later (2018) a PhD from the University of South Australia

== Artistic style and subject ==
Waters specialises in textile arts and techniques, such as embroidery. Waters’ blackwork is considered her signature technique. In her PhD thesis, she used textile arts to explore family genealogy. Her works have been described as deeply conceptual, witty, and using humble needlework to encompass worlds of concern. As well as examining the colonial experience through her art, she is concerned with practicing art on Aboriginal land and the impact of colonisation. She is also interested in textiles arts embodying labour and time.

== Academic career ==
As of 2024 Waters lectures in art history at Adelaide Central School of Art.

== Awards, residencies, and scholarships ==
- 2006: Ruth Tuck Scholarship for Visual Arts
- 2016: Heysen Prize for Landscape, Hahndorf Academy
- 2018: Hill Smith Gallery / University of South Australia Postgraduate Award, Helpmann Academy
- 2019: Finalist, Ramsay Art Prize, Art Gallery of South Australia
- 2020: Guildhouse Fellowship, from the Art Gallery of South Australia

== Collections ==
- Art Gallery of South Australia
- Cruthers Collection of Women's Art, University of Western Australia

== Bibliography ==
=== By Waters ===
- Lawrence, Kay, Waters, Sera, & Belfrage, Clare. 2018, Clare Belfrage : rhythms of necessity, Wakefield Press, Mile End, South Australia. Worldcat record
- Waters, Sera Jaye. 2006. Invoking disaster : visions of the monstrous and catastrophic in Japanese visual culture from the Edo and postwar periods. Thesis. University of Adelaide.
- Waters, Sera. 2007. Valuing relationships: Concertina. Artlink, Vol. 27, No. 4, 39-41
- Waters, Sera. 2012. Repetitive crafting: The shared aesthetic of time in Australian contemporary art. craft+design enquiry, 4, 69-87.
- Waters, Sera. 2015. Inside the Outback: An Exploration of Domesticated Landscapes in Semco’s Long Stitch Originals Series of the 1980s. craft+design enquiry, 7, (2015): 27-48.
- Waters, Sera. 2015. Knotted Lines: Entangling genealogical methodology with practice-led research. ACUADS 2015 Annual Conference. Australian Council of University Art and Design Schools.
- Waters, Sera. 2018. Genealogical ghostscapes : unsettling settler colonial home-making legacies in South Australia. Thesis. University of South Australia.
- Waters, Sera. 2020. Crafty prepping. Artlink, Vol. 40, No. 1, Mar 2020: 20-27.

=== About Waters ===
- Adams, Jude. Three artists - in the world: Anne Kay, Irmina van Niele, Sera Waters. Artlink, Vol. 29, No. 2, Jun 2009: 89.
- Clarke, K. 2016. Willful knitting? Contemporary Australian craftivism and feminist histories. Continuum, 30(3), 298-306.
- Coleman, Sheridan. Dark Portals: Sera Waters. Art Monthly Australia, no.264, Oct 2013: 39-42.
- Hart, Sheridan. 2018. Sera Waters unpicks the long stitches of Australian history. Art Guide Australia.
- Kelly, Miriam. 2017. Sera Waters: Domestic arts. Artlink, 37(4), 48–55.

=== Exhibition catalogues ===
- Capone, Jacobus & Thwaites, Vivonne & Garnaut, Christine & Collins, Julie & Fazakerley, Ruth, 1965- et al. (2012). Build me a city : an exploration of the archives of the Architecture Museum, UniSA by seven artists. Architecture Museum and Australian Experimental Art Foundation, Adelaide, S. Aust.
- Purvis, Andrew. 2020. "Drastic Fabric ". Adelaide Central School of Art.
- Waters, Sera, Nowell, Liz, & Kelly, Miriam. 2017. Sera Waters: Domestic arts. ACE Open. Worldcat record
