= Samstag Museum =

Art gallery in Adelaide, South Australia

Coordinates: 34.9222°S 138.5913°E

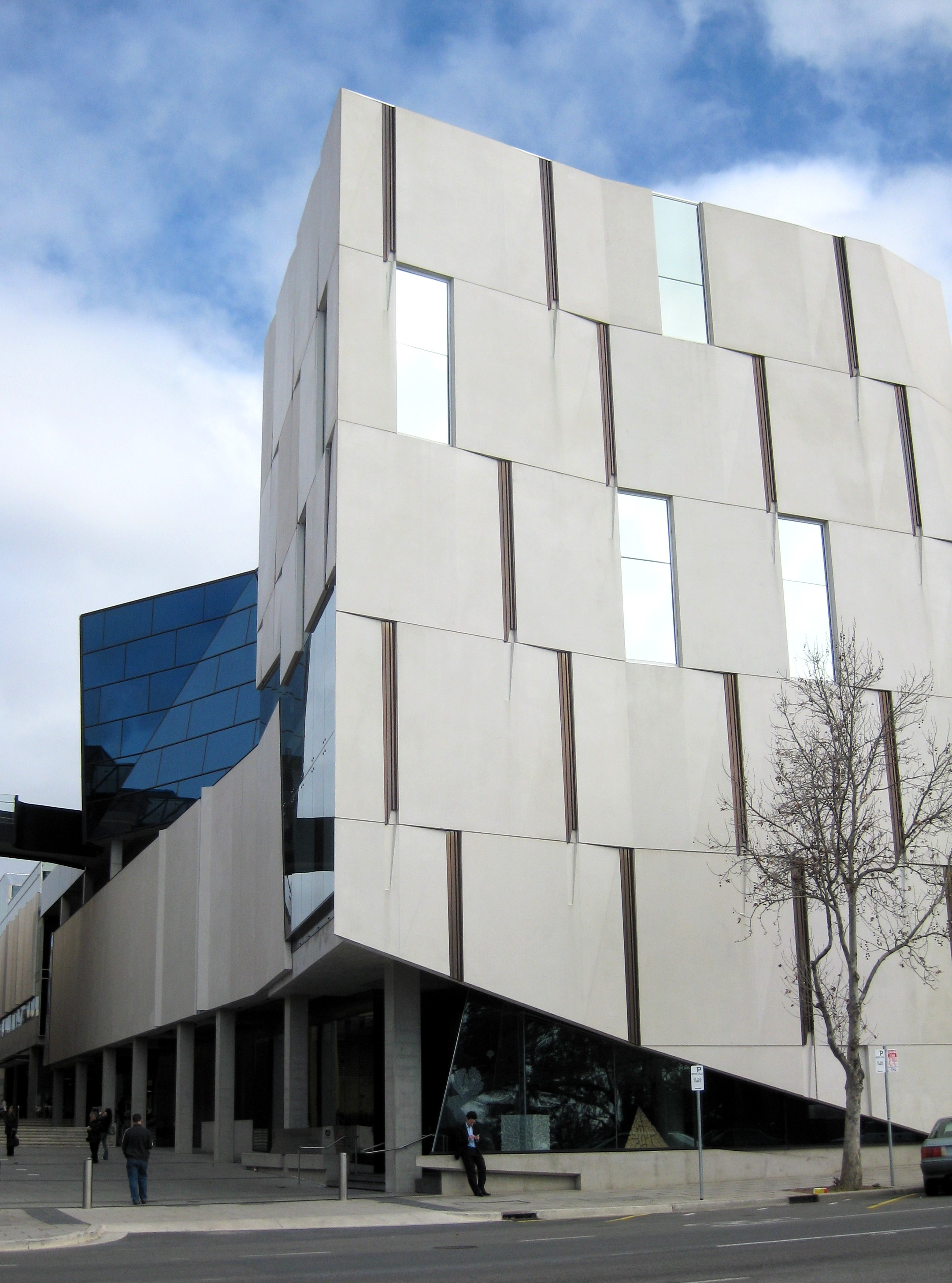
The Hawke Building on North Terrace, Adelaide at Adelaide University City Campus West

Samstag Museum of Art, also known as Samstag Museum or simply Samstag, is a contemporary art museum in Adelaide, South Australia. Part of Adelaide University, the museum is open to the public and has free admission.

The museum was opened in October 2007 as the Anne & Gordon Samstag Museum of Art, in the Hawke Building of the City West campus of the University of South Australia, which is now part of Adelaide University. The gallery had existed in previous incarnations from about 1977, with several names and locations over the next 30 years. In 1991, with the establishment of the University of South Australia, the gallery was renamed the University of South Australia Art Museum, relocating to City West in 1998. Following the merger between the University of South Australia and the University of Adelaide, Samstag became part of the newly-established Adelaide University.

== History and description ==
An art museum was opened in about 1977 as the College Gallery of the South Australian College of Advanced Education at its Underdale campus. In 1991, with the establishment of the University of South Australia, the gallery was renamed the University of South Australia Art Museum, relocating to City West in 1998. Following the merger between the University of South Australian and the University of Adelaide, Samstag became part of the newly established Adelaide University.

The Anne & Gordon Samstag Museum of Art was opened in the Hawke Building of the City West campus of the University of South Australia in October 2007. It is now referred to as Samstag Museum of Art, Samstag Museum and, simply, Samstag.

The museum was named in honour of Anne & Gordon Samstag, "two distinguished American benefactors to Australian culture, whose remarkable bequest provides opportunities for Australian artists to study overseas". Gordon Samstag was an American artist who taught at the South Australian School of Art from 1961 to 1970. Born in New York on 21 June 1906, he was educated at the New York Art Students League and the Académie Colarossi in Paris. His art is widely displayed in the US, including murals in now heritage-listed buildings in Scarsdale, New York and Reidsville, North Carolina. The Samstags moved to Florida in 1976, where Anne died in 1987, and Gordon in 1990.

The museum presents contemporary visual art in a series of changing exhibitions, as well as art of the past that has still has relevance, catering for a broad range of interests. The museum also manages and develops the University of South Australia Art Collection.

== Major exhibitions ==
=== Adelaide//International series ===
The Samstag was host to a series of three Adelaide International art exhibitions in partnership with the Adelaide Festival of Arts, between 2010 and 2014.

In 2019, as a continuation of the Adelaide International, but differing in concept and without the partnership of the Festival, the Samstag started a new cycle of three consecutive "Adelaide//International" exhibitions, for the 2019, 2020 and 2021 Adelaide Festivals.

==== 2019 ====
The 2019 Adelaide//International featured the work of four artists: Brook Andrew and Eugenia Lim from Australia, Lisa Reihana from New Zealand and Ming Wong from Singapore, exploring the effect of colonisation on indigenous culture.

=== 2020 ===
The 2020 exhibition centred around an installation called Somewhere Other by John Wardle Architects in collaboration with Natasha Johns-Messenger. It was Australia's entry in the 2018 Venice Architecture Biennale. It also features work by Belgian artist David Claerbout, Brad Darkson, Zoë Croggon, Helen Grogan and Georgia Saxelby. Due to run from 28 February to 12 June, the exhibition was cut short by the closure of the Samstag in March 2020 owing to the COVID-19 pandemic in Australia.

=== Individual exhibitions ===
==== 2013: Laurie Anderson ====
In 2013, director of the Festival David Sefton partnered with the Samstag to create an individual project of his own, entitled Laurie Anderson: Language of the Future, selected works 1971-2013, featuring the work of Laurie Anderson, who also performed her Duets on Ice outside the Samstag on opening night.

==== 2019: Anzac Day ====
On Anzac Day 2019, two exhibitions were launched at the Samstag: For Country, For Nation, looking at the experiences of Indigenous Australians during World War I, and Reality in flames: modern Australian art and the Second World War, a separate exhibition featuring the work of modernists, including Nora Heysen, Sidney Nolan and Albert Tucker in their response to World War II.

==== 2024: Archie Moore ====
Dwelling (Adelaide Issue), an installation by Archie Moore, whose work is represented in the Australian pavilion at the 2024 Venice Biennale, was created in collaboration with filmmaker Molly Reynolds under the auspices of the Adelaide Film Festival. The exhibition, which runs from 11 October 2024 until 29 November 2024, is the fifth iteration of the work Dwelling, based on memories of Moore's childhood bedroom.

== Samstag scholarships ==
The Anne & Gordon Samstag International Visual Arts Scholarships were established in 1991 through a bequest from the Samstags' estate. "Each scholarship includes, for twelve months of overseas study, a tax-exempt stipend equivalent to US$48,000, plus return airfares and institutional fees." From zero to a dozen scholarships have been awarded each year.

Past recipients include Megan Walch (1994), John Kelly (1995), and Darren Siwes (2002), Ruth Marshall, Rozalind Drummond, Susan Fereday, Kathy Temin, Julie Gough, Nicholas Folland, Shaun Gladwell, Monte Masi, Sasha Grbich and Darren Siwes.
