= Wakefield Press (Australia) =

Australian publishing house

- Status: Active
- Founded: 1942; 1989 (5th incarnation)
- Founders: Harry Muir (original); Revived by Government of South Australia in early 1980s
- Successor: Michael Bollen (from 1989)
- Country of origin: Australia
- Headquarters location: Adelaide
- Distribution: Australia
- Publication types: Books
- Nonfiction topics: History biography art education food & wine environment
- Fiction genres: Literary fiction popular fiction young adult fiction poetry
- Official website: www.wakefieldpress.com.au

Wakefield Press is an independent publishing company based in the Adelaide suburb of Mile End, South Australia. They publish around 40 titles a year in many genres and on many topics, with a special focus on South Australian stories.

Originally founded in 1942, the publisher celebrated its 30th anniversary under its current management and name in 2019.

== History ==
A publishing company under the name The Wakefield Press was founded in 1942 by Adelaide bookseller Harry Muir (1909–1991), owner of Beck Book Company Limited in Pulteney Street. Beck Book Company, in Ruthven Mansions, was a well-known bookshop, described as "once the city's outstanding second-hand bookstore", and also known as Beck's Bookshop, Beck's Bookstore, Beck's Book Shop, or simply Beck's.

Muir's intention was to publish small, historical monographs which he believed would otherwise go unread. The company's first publication was A Checklist of Ex-Libris Literature Published in Australia, owing to Muir's interest in bookplates. The press operated out of the bookshop from the 1940s to 1960s.

In the 1980s, the state government re-established the name as Wakefield Press, as part of the state's sesquicentenary (150-year anniversary) celebrations, and a series of histories was published.

As proprietor of the monthly cultural magazine the Adelaide Review, Christopher Pearson bought the name of the Wakefield Press from the South Australian government and operated the company from 1986 to 1988.

Michael Bollen, who had worked with Pearson, took over the company in 1989, with Stephanie Johnston buying in a year or so later. They moved to premises in The Parade West, Kent Town, where they stayed until relocation to Mile End in August–September 2014.

== Current management ==
As of March 2022, Wakefield publishes approximately 40 titles each year on a diverse range of topics, including literary and popular fiction, young adult fiction and a range of non-fiction topics. They retain their focus on Australian authors and topics, particularly South Australian.

They have a focus on young adult fiction, with editor Margot Lloyd as publisher of the Young Adult list. They successfully launched Making Friends with Alice Dyson by Adelaide first-time author Poppy Nwosu in 2019. The management team believe that they can take risks that larger companies, being controlled by their marketing departments, cannot take.

== Notable publications ==
- Ochre and Rust: Artefacts and Encounters on Australian Frontiers, by Philip Jones, Senior Curator at the South Australian Museum, won the non-fiction prize in the inaugural Prime Minister's Literary Awards in 2008.
- Mallee Boys by Charlie Archbold was awarded Honour Book for Older Readers in the 2018 Children's Book Council of Australia Awards.
- Red Professor: The Cold War Life of Fred Rose, by Peter Monteath and Valerie Munt, was shortlisted for the Prime Minister's Literary Awards Prize for Australian History in 2016.
- An Unsentimental Bloke: The Life and Work of C.J. Dennis, by Philip Butterss won the National Biography Award in 2015.
- Places Women Make: Unearthing the Contribution of Women to Our Cities, by Jane Jose won the 2016 Bates Smart Award for Architecture in Media.
- Stephen Orr, who has been longlisted and shortlisted for several literary awards over his long career with Wakefield, was longlisted for the Miles Franklin Literary Award for the second time in 2016, for The Hands.

Many of Wakefield's books have achieved Australian bestseller status, including The Vanished Land, by Richard Zachariah, The Home of the Blizzard, by Sir Douglas Mawson, One Magic Square, by Lolo Houbein, Behind the Veil, by Lydia Laube, and Your Brick Oven, by Russell Jeavons.

Book series published have included the AATE Interface Series, the Friendly Street Poets, the Pentageli Papers, South Australian Living Artists (SALA) series and the Wakefield Crime Series.

== Partnerships ==
Wakefield Press have partnerships with a number of cultural and educational institutions in South Australia, and relationships with overseas publishers which market their titles.

== See also ==
- List of South Australian manufacturing businesses
