= Annette Bezor =

Australian painter (1950-2020)

- Born: 5 April 1950; Adelaide, South Australia
- Died: 9 January 2020 (aged 69); North Adelaide, South Australia
- Known for: Subversive images of women
- Notable work: Jackie and Jude (Version ii), Miss Wong and Me
- Awards: Finalist, Archibald Prize, Doug Moran Portrait Prize, Sir John Sulman Prize
- Website: bezor.com.au

Annette Bezor (5 April 1950 – 9 January 2020), born Annette Bateman, was an Australian painter and feminist, who lived and worked in Adelaide, South Australia. She was known for appropriating classical and pop culture images of women and using them to create stylised representations of them, often sexually charged images but not pandering to the male gaze and thereby highlighting society's attitudes towards women. Her work won significant commercial and critical success.

Bezor had 30 solo exhibitions, with her works exhibited throughout Australia as well as in Europe, Hong Kong, and the USA. She was a finalist in multiple art prizes in Australia, including the Archibald, Doug Moran and Sulman prizes as well as the Portia Geach Memorial Award in Sydney.

== Early life ==
Bezor was born on 5 April 1950 in Adelaide, South Australia, into a working-class family, the second child of Alma (Billi) Smith and policeman Keith Bateman. After her parents divorced, she changed her surname to Bezor, which originated from her mother's family. She left school at 14 because of bullying, and worked in a hairdressing salon where a remark by the manager on her "puppy fat" led to her suffering from anorexia for four years. She married twice, briefly.

In 1974 she enrolled in the South Australian School of Art and graduated in 1977 with a degree in fine art. She afterwards said that she had felt "stultified" working in the male-dominated art school environment, and did her best work at home. In the mid-1970s the Women's Art Movement in South Australia was strong, which Bezor found empowering.

== Career ==
In the early 1980s, Bezor's work The Snake is Dead won critical acclaim. Her work was exhibited in Adelaide, Sydney, Hobart and Melbourne in the 1980s. She was awarded the Australia Council's studio residency at the Cité internationale des arts in Paris, which she took up in 1987 and where she painted Romance is in the Air. This was described by her agent Paul Greenaway as a "turning point in her career", where she worked on developing her signature style of appropriating images of women and subverting them in her paintings.

She continued her career after her return from Paris, achieving significant commercial and critical success. In the 1990s, her work was exhibited in Adelaide, Sydney, Brisbane, and Melbourne, and in the 2000s, Hong Kong, Spain, Taipei and New York. She was commissioned by the Parliament of Victoria to paint the official portrait of the former Victorian Premier, Joan Kirner in 1994.

== Later years ==
Bezor was diagnosed with ovarian cancer in 2017. She continued to paint and at the same time caring for her mother until her death in 2019. The last exhibitions of her work were Ricochet, at the Hill Smith Gallery in Adelaide, and a companion retrospective exhibition, Ricochet 2, at Aptos Cruz Gallery at Stirling, in the Adelaide Hills, both in October 2019.

Bezor died at the Mary Potter Hospice at the Calvary North Adelaide Hospital on 9 January 2020.

== Gallery holdings ==
- The Art Gallery of South Australia holds six of Bezor's works, including Jackie and Jude (Version ii), which is on display in Gallery 6 as a tribute to her legacy.
- The Art Gallery of New South Wales holds two paintings, Pigs and Rosie as Eve.
- The National Gallery of Victoria holds three works, including The Snake is Dead.

== Awards ==
Bezor's work has been selected as finalists in several major art prizes, and has won three smaller ones.

- Archibald Prize, 2004 & 2005, finalist (2005 for Still posing after all this time (a self-portrait))
- Sir John Sulman Prize, 1992, 2002 & 2009, finalist
- Portia Geach Memorial Award, 1993 & 1999, finalist
- John McCaughey Memorial Art Prize, 1981, 1983 & 1994, finalist
- Sara Weis Award, 1992, first prize
- Maude Vizard Wholohan Art Prize, co-winner
- John Christie Wright Memorial Prize for Life Drawing and Painting, 1977, winner

=== Fellowships ===
- 2010 Arts SA Fellowship
- 1990 Australia Council Fellowship
