= Victor Harbor High School =

School in South Australia

Coordinates: 35°33′S 138°37′E

Victor Harbor High School (VHHS) is located in Victor Harbor, on the Fleurieu Peninsula in South Australia.
