= Robert Menzies Institute =

Australian Prime-Ministerial Library

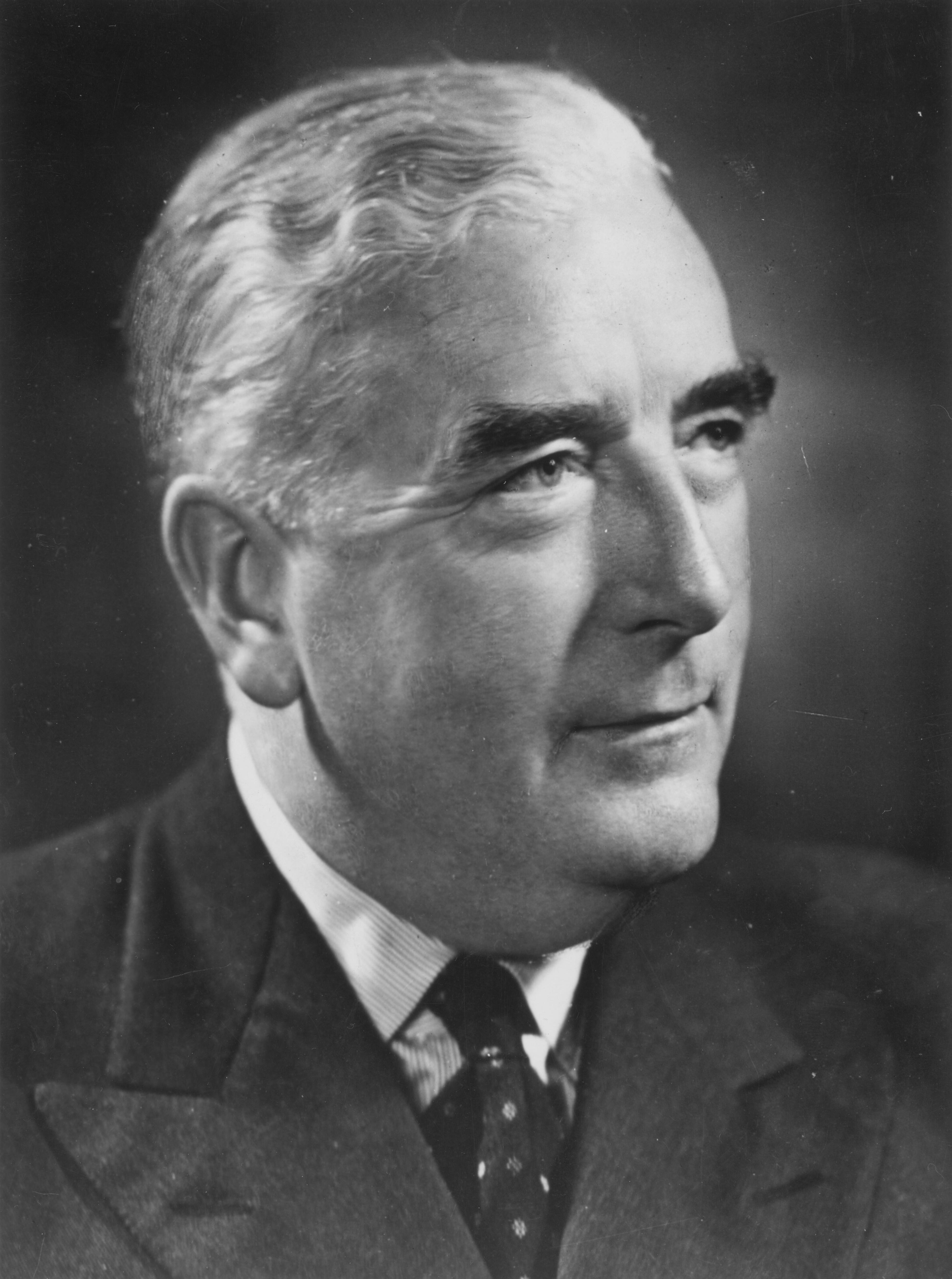
Robert Menzies

The Robert Menzies Institute is an Australian Prime Minsterial Library and museum dedicated to the 12th and longest serving Australian Prime Minister, Sir Robert Menzies. The Library is situated on the Parkville campus of the University of Melbourne since founding in 2021.

The University of Melbourne announced that it would house the Institute in April 2021. It faced resistance in the run up to its opening due to its links with the Australian Liberal Party and conservative politics. The University of Melbourne proceeded with opening the Library, which opened in 2021. In 2017 the University received a 7-Million dollar grant from the government to refurbish the building which the Institute would be housed in.

== Activities ==
The Institute hosts a variety of events, including book launches, orations, and cultural events. One such oration is the ANZAC day oration, which features a speech regarding the security of Australia. The institute also runs a number of history-related events for schoolchildren and teachers and hosts a yearly public speaking competition, available for Australian students in years 9 to 12.

The Institute also runs weekly podcast 'Afternoon Light', hosted by CEO Georgina Downer, and has interviewed various Australian Political figures, including Scott Morrison, James Patterson, Simon Birmingham, Tony Abbott, and Malcom Turnbull.

== Leadership ==
As of June 2024, the CEO of the Institute was Georgina Downer, a former diplomat, lawyer, Liberal Party candidate, journalist and daughter of Australian Politician Alexander Downer.

The board is made up of a variety of academics, media figures, and business leaders. Notable members include Peta Credlin AM, Leigh Clifford AC, and David Kemp AM
