= The Adelaide Review =

Australian arts and news magazine

- Editor: Amanda Pepe
- Former editors: Christopher Pearson
- Photographer: Sia Duff
- Categories: Arts and culture
- Frequency: Monthly
- Circulation: 22,000 (2018)
- Publisher: Opinion Media
- First issue: March 1984
- Final issue: October 2020
- Company: Global Intertrade
- Country: Australia
- Based in: Adelaide
- Language: English
- Website: www.adelaidereview.com.au
- ISSN: 0815-5992

The Adelaide Review (AR) was a monthly print arts magazine and dynamic website in Adelaide, South Australia. It was first published in 1984, but gained standing after one of its writers, Christopher Pearson, took it over in 1985. In March 2019, it was one of only two "broad-spectrum non-Murdoch print media" publications in Adelaide, the other one being SA Life.

Its 488th and final issue was published in print and online on 1 October 2020.

== History ==
The Adelaide Review existed in a number of forms since 1984, as both a magazine and a newspaper.

The first edition came out in March 1984. Christopher Pearson bought the rights to The Adelaide Preview, a magazine curated by Terry Plane and published by Mark Jamieson in Hindley Street.

In the year April 2003–March 2004, CAB-audited average monthly circulation was 38,642. In the period 2004-2007, the magazine was published fortnightly. In April–September 2013 its monthly circulation was 20,058.

In August 2008, the print magazine Place was merged into the AR, after its last edition (Vol. 2, no. 7) in December 2007. For a while it featured as a monthly section.

In March 2019, it was one of only two "broad-spectrum non-Murdoch print media" publications in Adelaide, the other one being SA Life.

Its 488th and final issue was published in print and online on 1 October 2020. Its last publisher and editor was Amanda Pepe, who had joined the paper for the second time in 2017. She wrote in her final editorial that the COVID-19 pandemic in Australia had made continued publication unviable.

In July 2023, almost three years after its official death, the newspaper was used by Prensa Ibérica to publish daily polls on the 2023 Spanish general election, to skirt around the rules by the Spanish electoral commission prohibiting Spanish media from distributing surveys on the five days prior to the election.

== Content and readership ==
According to its 2018 media kit,

"The Adelaide Review [was] a monthly print magazine and dynamic website that present[ed] a comprehensive balance of local, national and international features, reviews and opinion pieces with a particular focus on culture and social issues."

The monthly print magazine was available free at more than 700 newsagents, cafés, restaurants, bars and bookshops across Adelaide and regional centres, or could be purchased by annual subscription. Circulation of the print magazine was about 22,000 and readership 72,000 in 2018. Its target demographic was "tertiary educated professionals who have disposable income and are interested in culture and the arts" and its top interests were listed as the arts, food, cinema, events, travel, news and opinion.

== Ownership ==
From April 2015 the Review was published by Adelaide-based Opinion Media (OM), which also owned Rip it Up until it ceased publication in 2016. At that time, the managing director was Manuel Ortigosa.

As of 2007 OM was owned by Intertrade Global, in turn owned by EPI Communications. Intertrade was owned by Euro-Pacific Holdings.

In 2009, the AR was reported to have been owned by Spanish publisher Javier Moll.

== Notable contributors ==
- John Neylon
- Kerryn Goldsworthy
