= RMIT Melbourne City campus =

University campus in Melbourne, Australia

Coordinates: 37°48′28″S 144°57′48″E

The Melbourne City campus of the Royal Melbourne Institute of Technology (RMIT University) is located in the city centre of Melbourne in Victoria, Australia. It is sometimes referred to as "RMIT City" and the "RMIT Quarter" of the city in the media.

== Campus location ==
=== Origins ===
The City campus is RMIT's original campus and was founded in 1887 as the Working Men's College (now Building 1). The college was initially established as a night school for the instruction of "art, science and technology" – in the words of its founder Francis Ormond – "especially to working men". Ormond believed that the college was of "great importance and value" to the fast-pace industrialisation of Melbourne during the late 19th century. Subsequently, he campaigned for it to be located in the city centre. His nominated site, on the corner of La Trobe Street and Bowen Street, was donated by the government from land reserved for the colonial Supreme Court. The site was chosen so that the college would benefit from a proximity to the Melbourne Public Library and Art Gallery (now the state State Library of Victoria) on the corner of Swanston Street and La Trobe Street.

Due to its location in Melbourne's former justice precinct, the college originally bordered the Melbourne Gaol, City Watch-House (now Building 19) and Supreme Court (later the Magistrates' Court and now Building 20). As the gaol was progressively decommissioned and demolished, the college expanded over the site – and also acquired many of the surrounding former judicial buildings. As a result, the campus occupies an historically (as well as archaeologically) significant area of Melbourne's city centre. The unprecedented success of the college, and its eventual growth into what is today RMIT, was not considered in planning of the day. Subsequently, the campus developed in an unsystematic manner when land or buildings were able to be acquired – leading to the contiguity of the campus with the city during the 20th century.

=== City campus today ===
Today the City campus is the largest of RMIT's five campuses – now located across the metropolitan area of Melbourne and in Vietnam. As of 2010, it has a gross floor area of 307,466 m^{2} over 68 buildings. It is situated over a six city block area of roughly 720,000 m^{2}, to the north of the La Trobe Street-end of Melbourne's Hoddle Grid, and is a convergent part of the city centre's northern section. The scattered nature of the campus within the city has been likened to the campuses of New York University and the Sorbonne – as by Australian foreign minister Bob Carr for example.

It is bounded by La Trobe Street to the south, Lygon Street and Russell Street to the east, Queensberry Street and Victoria Street to the north, Elizabeth Street and Swanston Street to the west. The densest area of the campus, around Swanston Street, is sometimes referred to as the "RMIT Quarter" of the city. It is surrounded by significant multicultural areas such as Melbourne's Chinatown, Greek Precinct and Little Italy, as well as cultural institutions such as the adjacent State Library of Victoria and nearby Queen Victoria Market. In the way of public transport; it is well served by trams travelling along Swanston Street and by the train station at the Melbourne Central Shopping Centre on the corner of La Trobe Street and Swanston Street.

The main thoroughfare of the campus is Bowen Street. The city blocks east of Bowen Street to Russell Street and west of Bowen Street to Swanston Street, between La Trobe Street to the south and Franklin Street to the north, are completely occupied by campus buildings. Bowen Street is closed to public traffic, and encompasses Ellis Court at its southern end and Bowen Terrace at its northern end. It was designed as a pedestrian spine by architect Peter Elliot in 2000. There are no large open spaces on the dense urban campus. However, some pockets of open space exist around Bowen Street, which include Alumni Courtyard, The Belvedere, Bowen Terrace, Casey Plaza, Ellis Court and University Lawn. The lawns of the State Library (adjacent to the southern end of the campus) are also popular with students.

== Written works about the campus ==
A skilled hand and cultivated mind: a guide to the architecture and art of RMIT University records the importance of art and architecture in the university's history, as well as charting some of the changes in Australian art and architecture over the last 125 years. Starting with the Francis Ormond Building, the university's first home, this book takes the reader around RMIT University's campuses, and gives an overview of RMIT University's architecture and art.

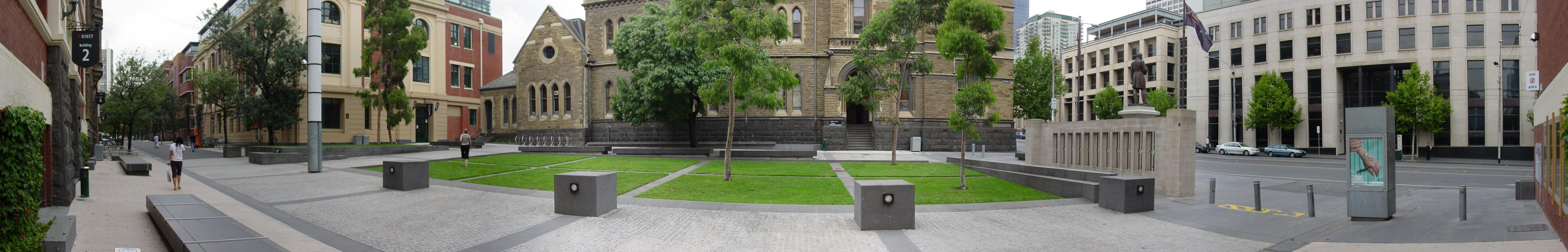
The southern entrance to Bowen Street (at La Trobe Street). Building 1 and Ellis Court are in the centre and Building 3 is to the left. The State Library of Victoria is to the right (across La Trobe Street).

== Campus development history ==
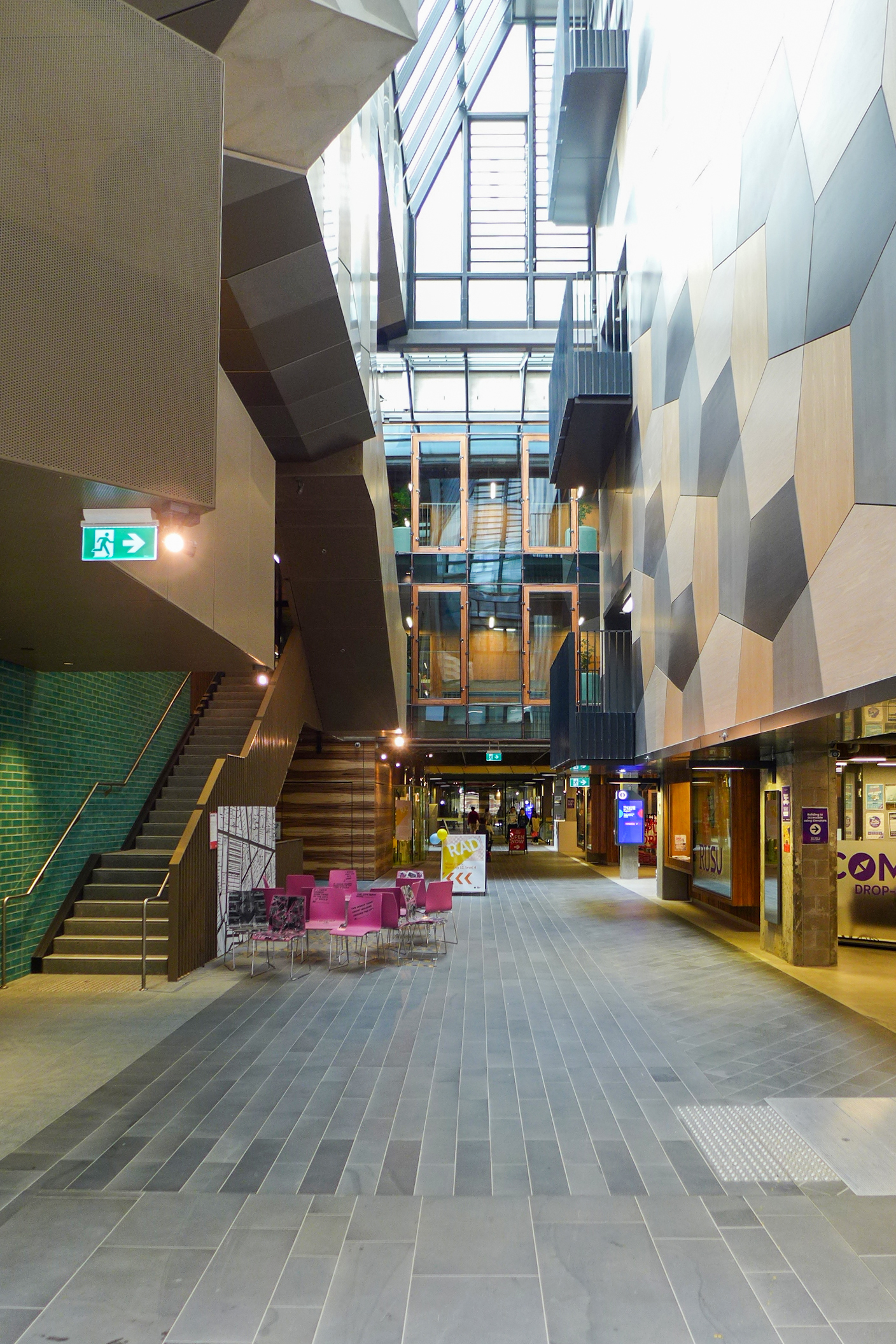
RMIT New Academic Street complete renovation in 2017

From the 1890s, RMIT's campus had developed in an ad hoc manner of purpose-built and acquired buildings. Subsequently, no master plan for the campus was implemented until 1930. In 1929, it was granted the eastern side of Bowen Street for development – over areas of the recently decommissioned Melbourne Gaol. The development of this area progressed slowly and was not fully completed until the mid-1950s. During this time, the campus was – as described by architect Peter Elliot – "just a cacophony of cluttered streets, laneways, dead-ends and hidden courts". In 1950, the Melbourne City Council granted the exclusive use of Bowen Street to RMIT for its campus. And, by the mid-1960s, the campus occupied all of the buildings fronting Bowen Street and a number of buildings fronting the eastern side of Swanston Street – between La Trobe Street and Franklin Street.

A comprehensive master plan for the campus was then developed by architect Osborn McCutcheon in 1965. The master plan included the controversial tower blocks – Building 10 (Casey Wing), Building 12 (Gillespie Wing) and Building 14 – which front the eastern side of Swanston Street. The buildings were constructed over the historic Ormond Mathematics School (where Building 14 stands), Automotive Engineering School and Foundry School (where Building 12 stands). They were intended to be part of the suite of five identical blocks which ran the length of Swanston Street from La Trobe Street to Franklin Street. However, after completion of the first three buildings, during the 1970s, public opinion swung against their design. Dubbed the "grey silos", the austere functionalist design of the towers was criticised for a lack of windows facing Swanston Street. As a result, the remaining two towers were never completed.

In 1975, architect John Andrews was engaged to design the first stage of new Building 8 (Union House) in place of the fourth tower block. The lower three levels of the building were constructed as the first stage over the Pharmacy School and McComas Wool School as well as Pharmacy Lane (which originally connected the middle of Bowen Street with Swanston Street) and the northern section of Bowen Lane (the remaining section renamed Rodda Lane). The second stage of Building 8 was constructed in 1993 to a postmodern design by architect Peter Corrigan. It was the last large-scale building constructed on the Bowen Street blocks of the campus. The proposed fifth tower block was never built, and subsequently the historic Building 16 (Storey Hall) and Building 22 (Singer Building) still stand on the site.

In the late 1990s, architect Peter Elliot was engaged to undertake the most significant redesign of the campus' urban landscape in its history. The first stage was completed in 2000, and included the redevelopment of Bowen Street into a pedestrian spine and creation of Ellis Court at its northern end and Bowen Terrace at its southern end as open spaces. It also included the creation of Rodda Lane and University Way as secondary pedestrian laneways. The second stage was completed in 2007, and included the redevelopment of the historic walled yard of the Old Melbourne Gaol as an open space (renamed Alumni Courtyard), as well as a large stairway linking it to University Way. The third stage was completed in conjunction with Elliot's refurbishment of Building 1 (Francis Ormond Building) in 2010, and included the creation of a lawned common area named University Lawn at the southern end of University Way.

In 2007, to mark its 120th anniversary, RMIT instigated a A$600 million capital works program. The program (which concludes in 2015) includes the refurbishment of a large number of existing buildings on the campus and the construction of major new buildings – notably Building 80 (Swanston Academic Building) and Building 100 (Design Hub). It also plans the campus' expansion to the western side of Swanston Street, to occupy the majority of its frontage from La Trobe Street to Victoria Street. The program is designed to facilitate the consolidation of RMIT's colleges and schools into the main campus area from their locations in disparate buildings around the city centre.

== Significant buildings ==
Building 1 in the 1900s

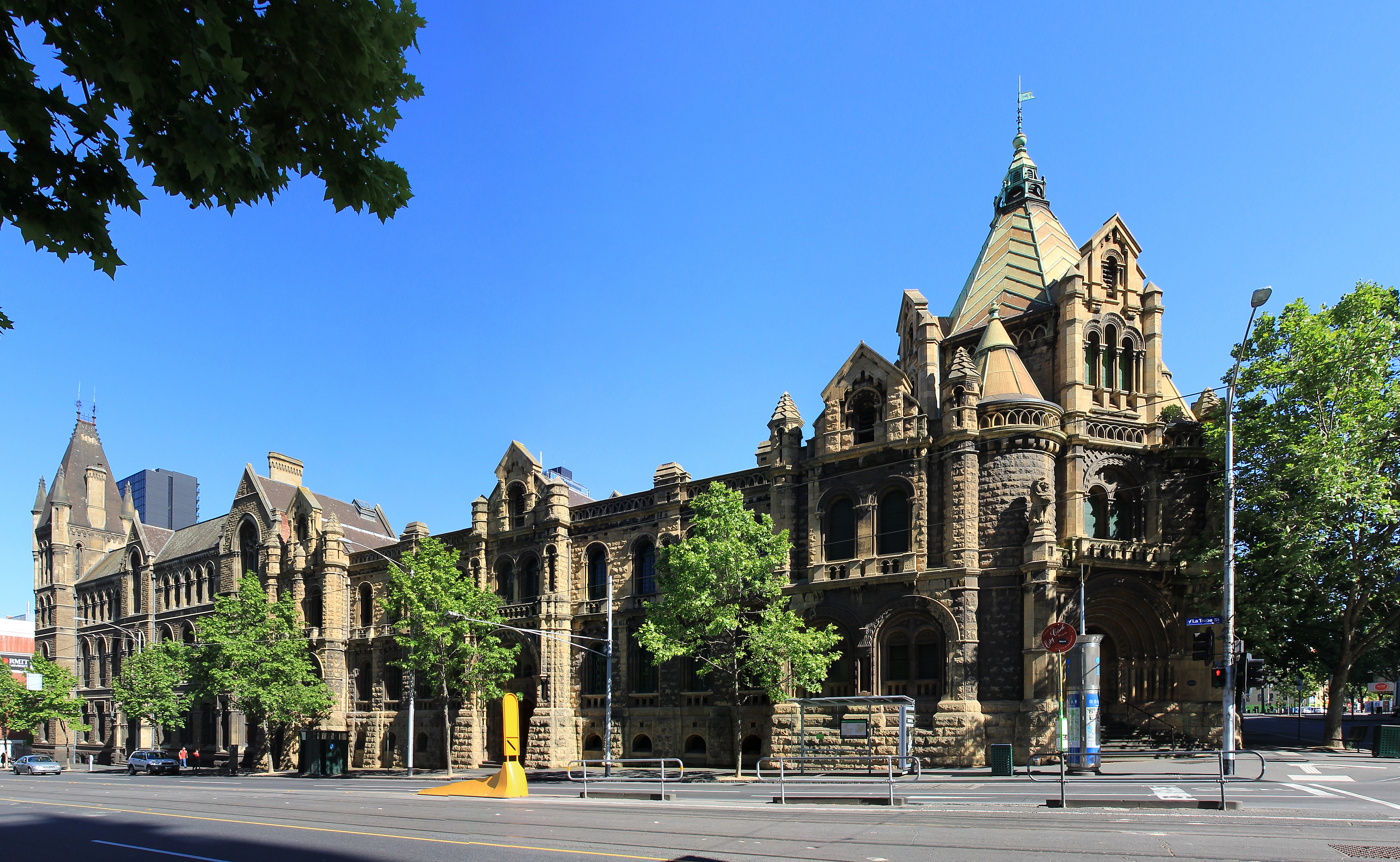
Streetscape of Building 1 and Building 20 on La Trobe Street

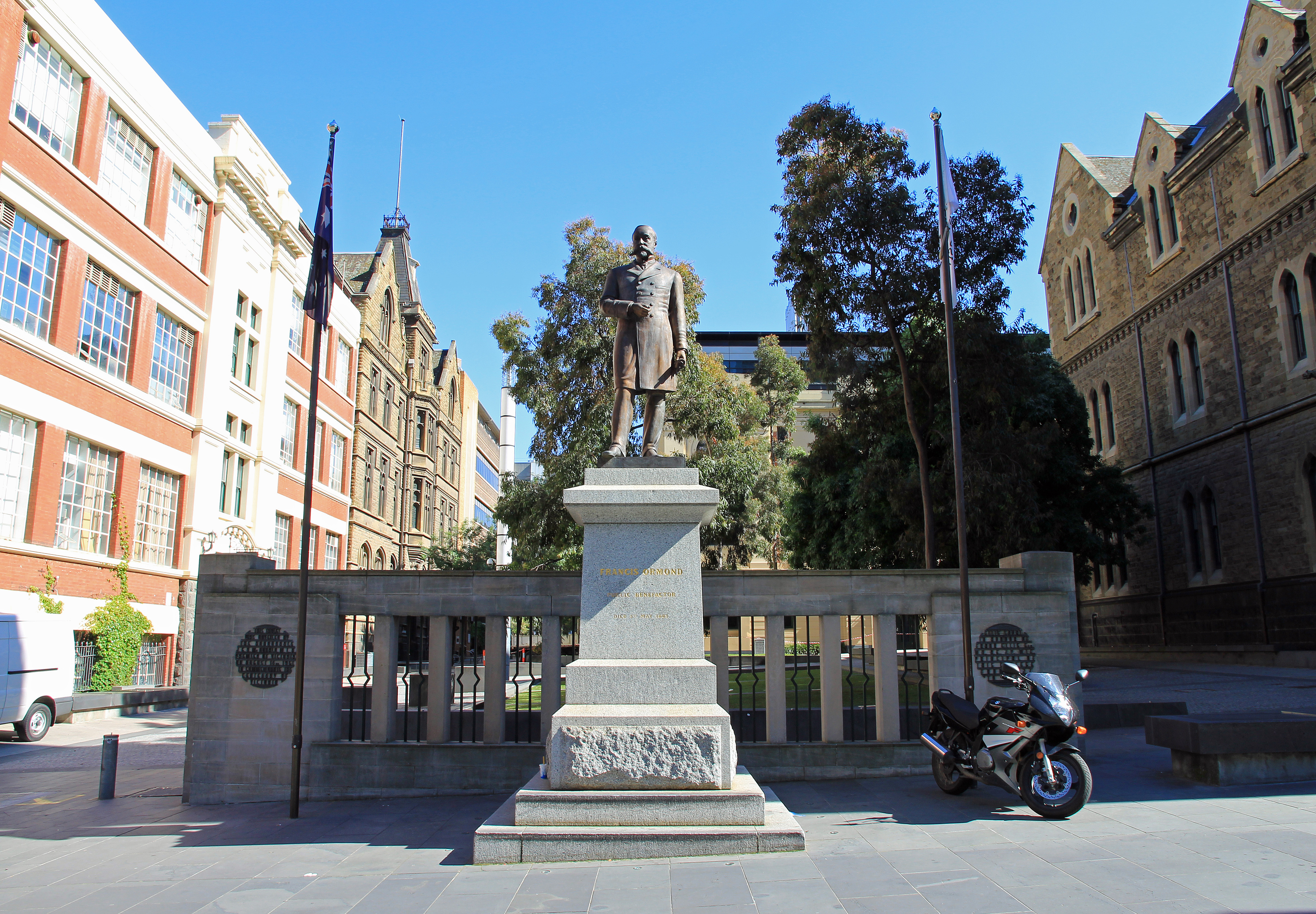
Ormond statue, Building 1 (right) and Building 2 (left) from La Trobe Street

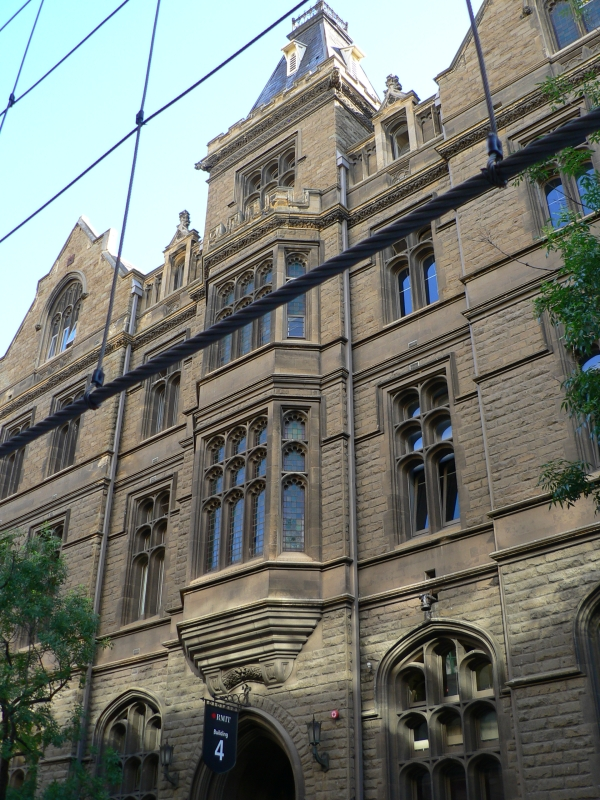
Building 4 on Bowen Street

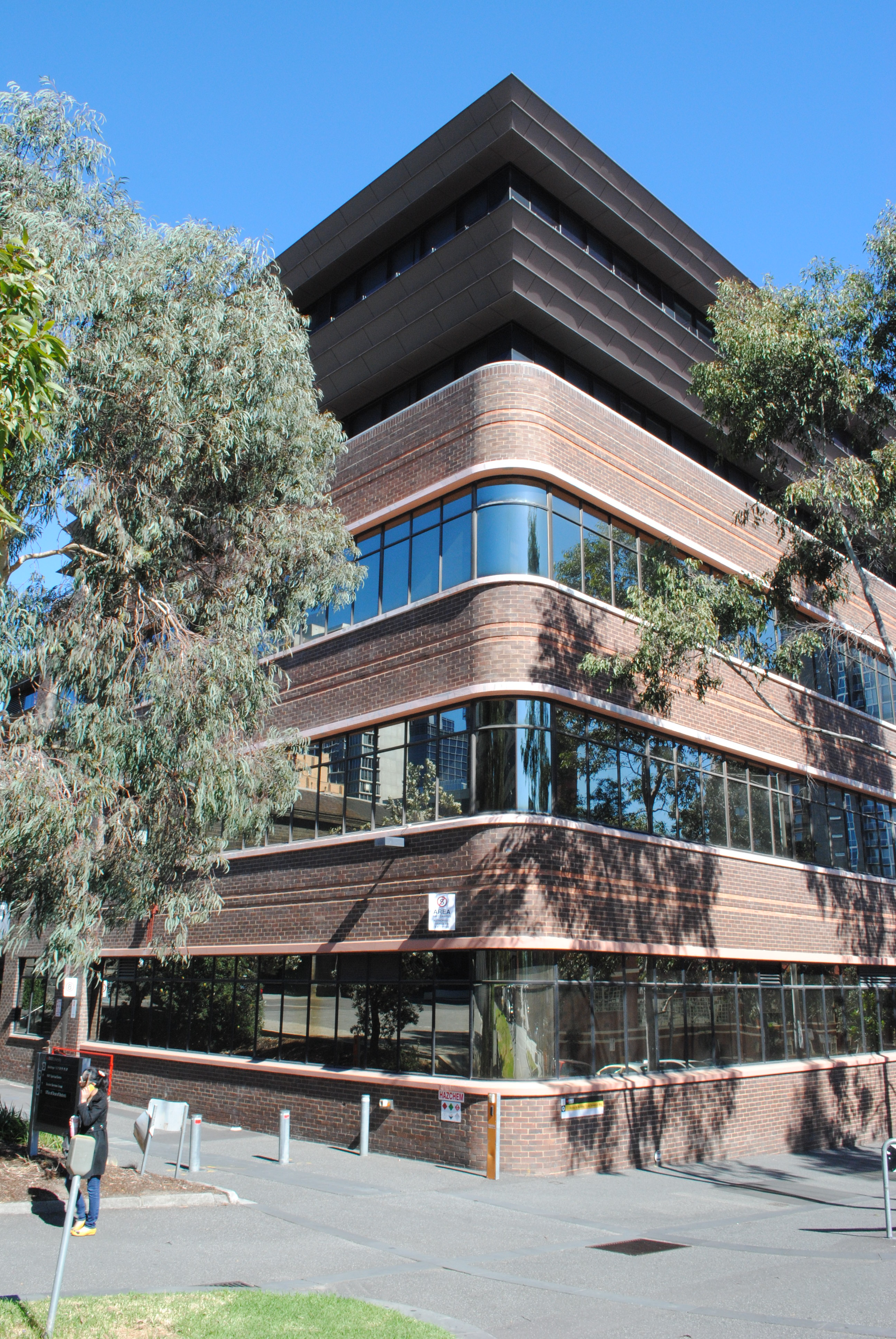
Building 9 from Franklin Street

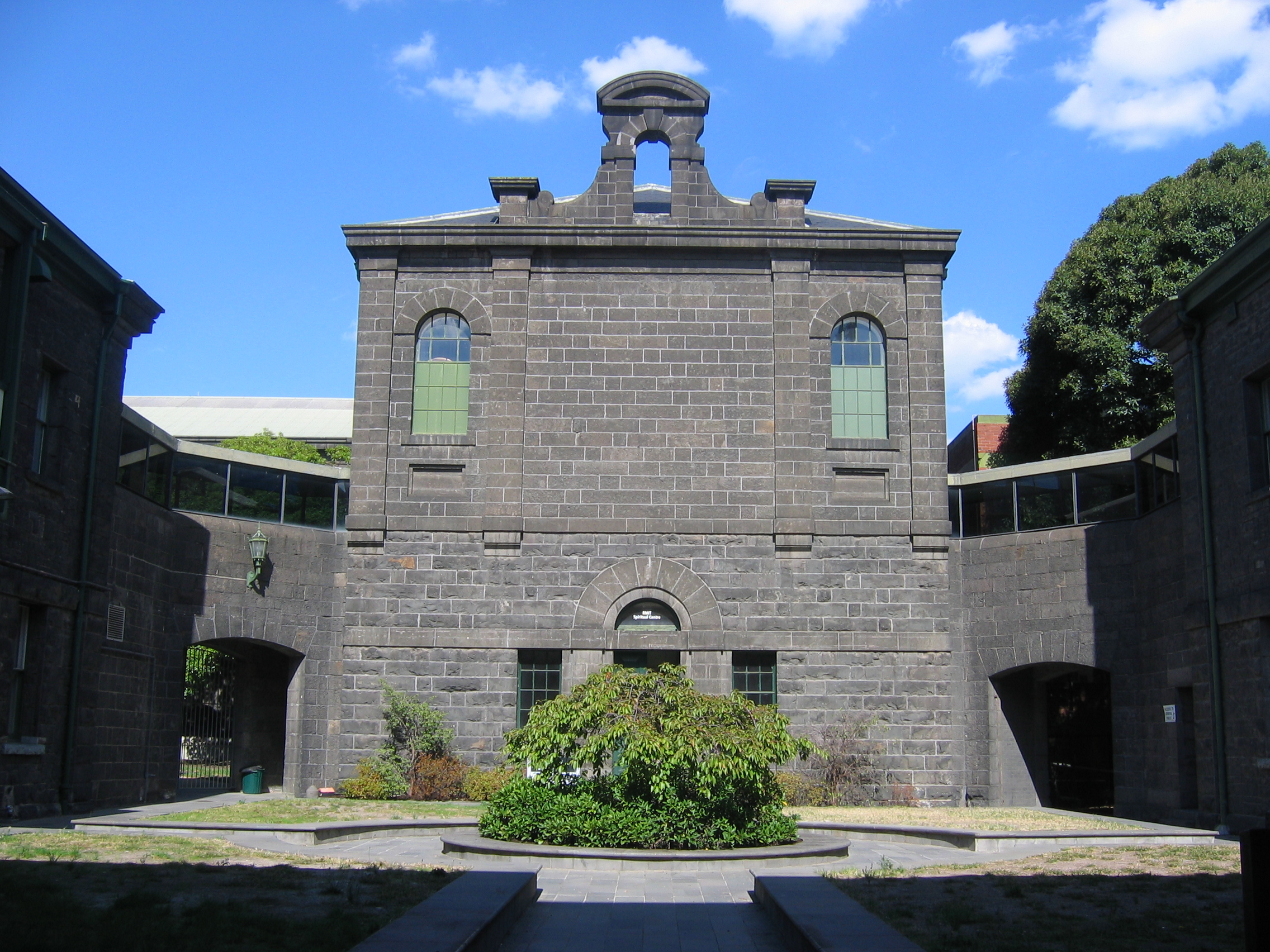
The 150+ year old chapel of Building 11 is the oldest building on the campus

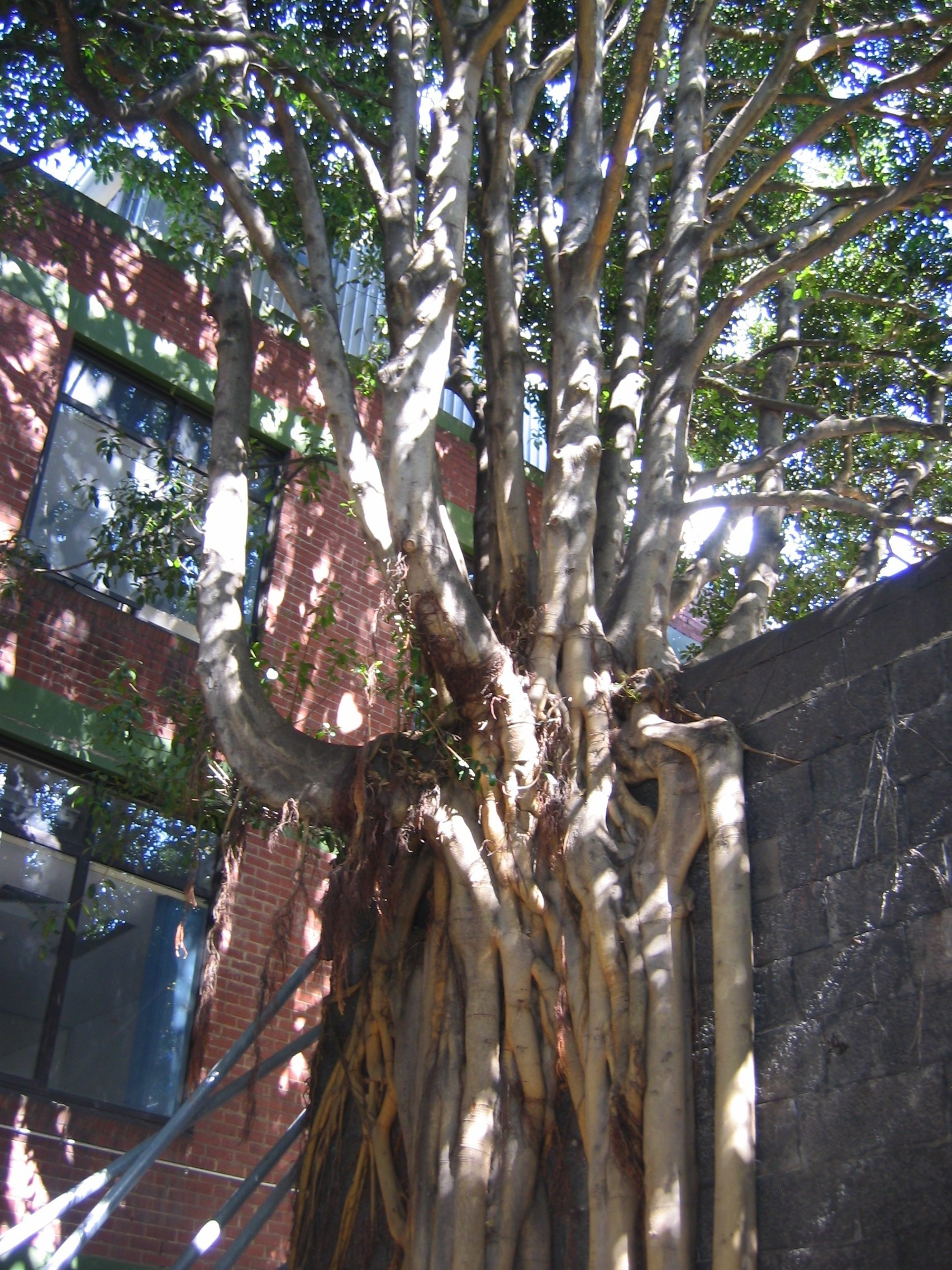
Fig tree growing atop the wall of a courtyard in Building 11

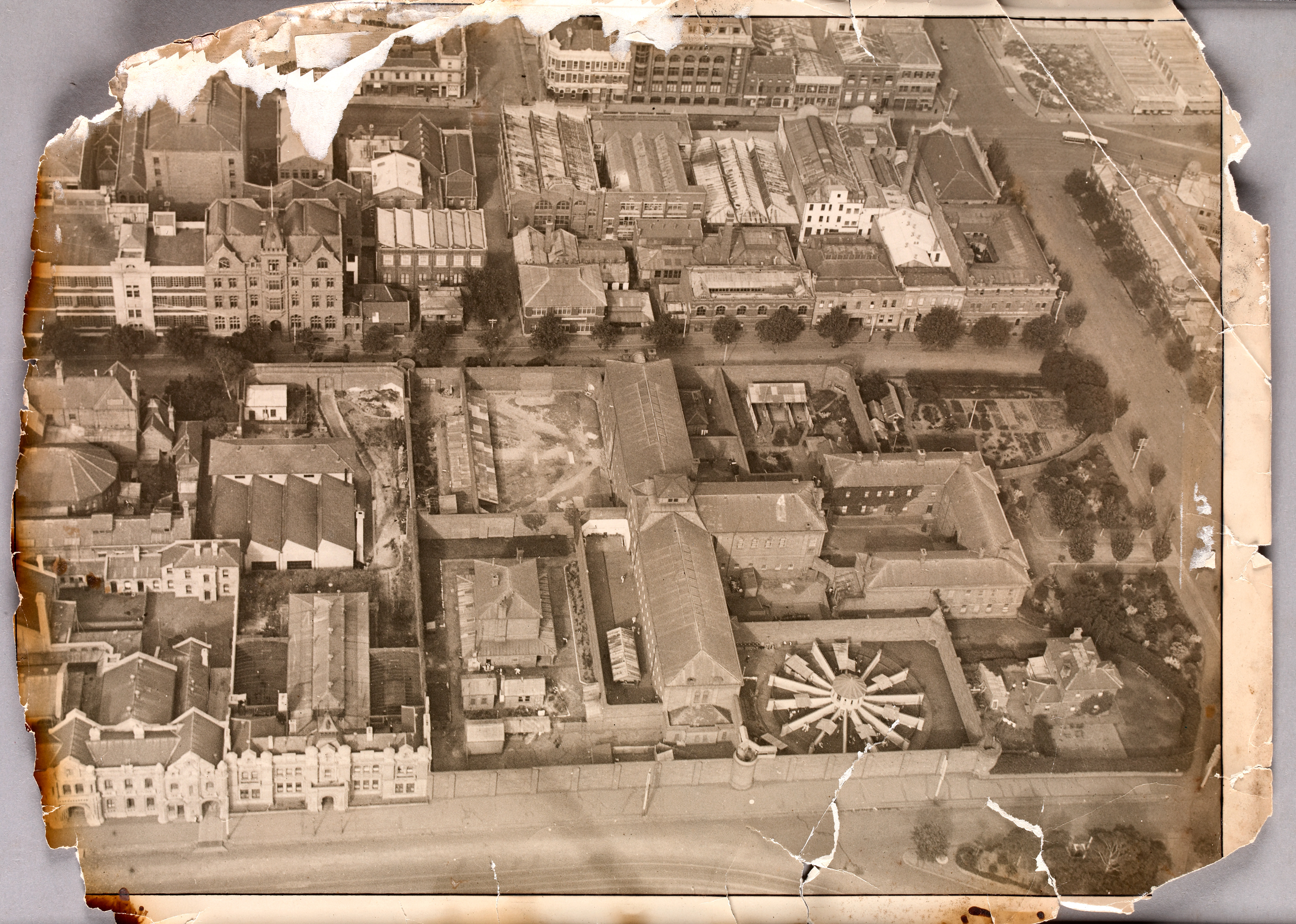
Old Melbourne Gaol site in the 1920s

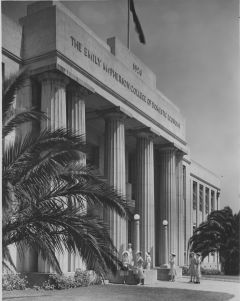
Building 13 in the 1930s

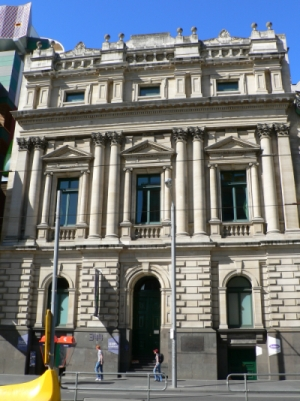
Building 16 on Swanston Street

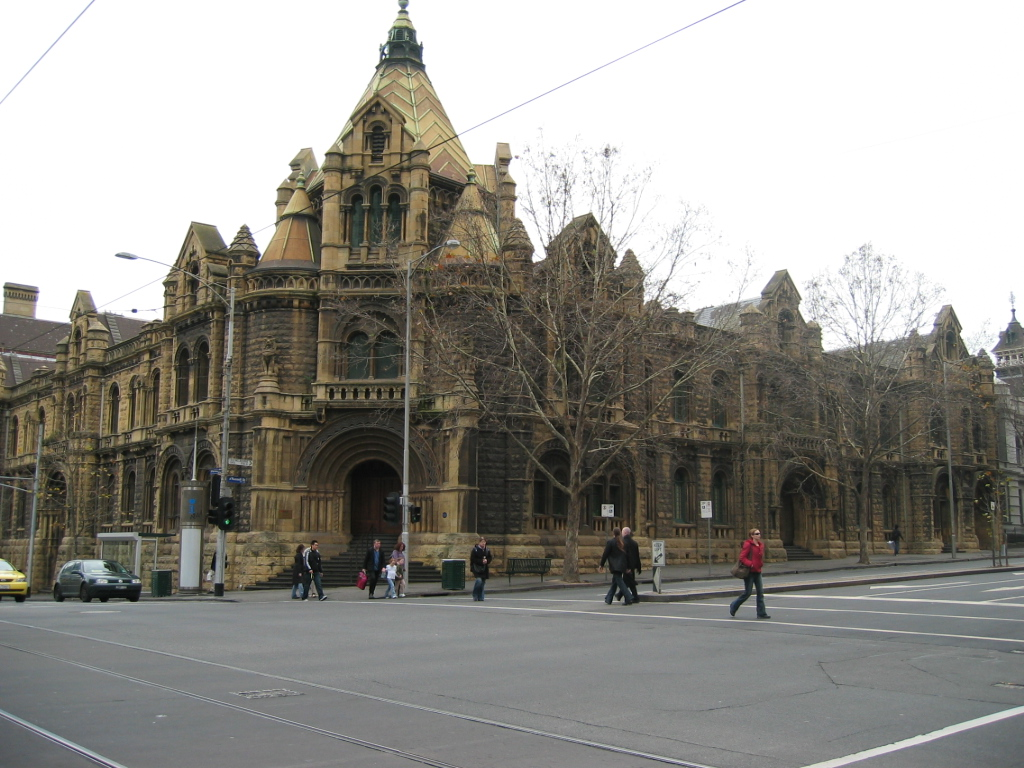
Building 20 on the corner of La Trobe and Russell streets

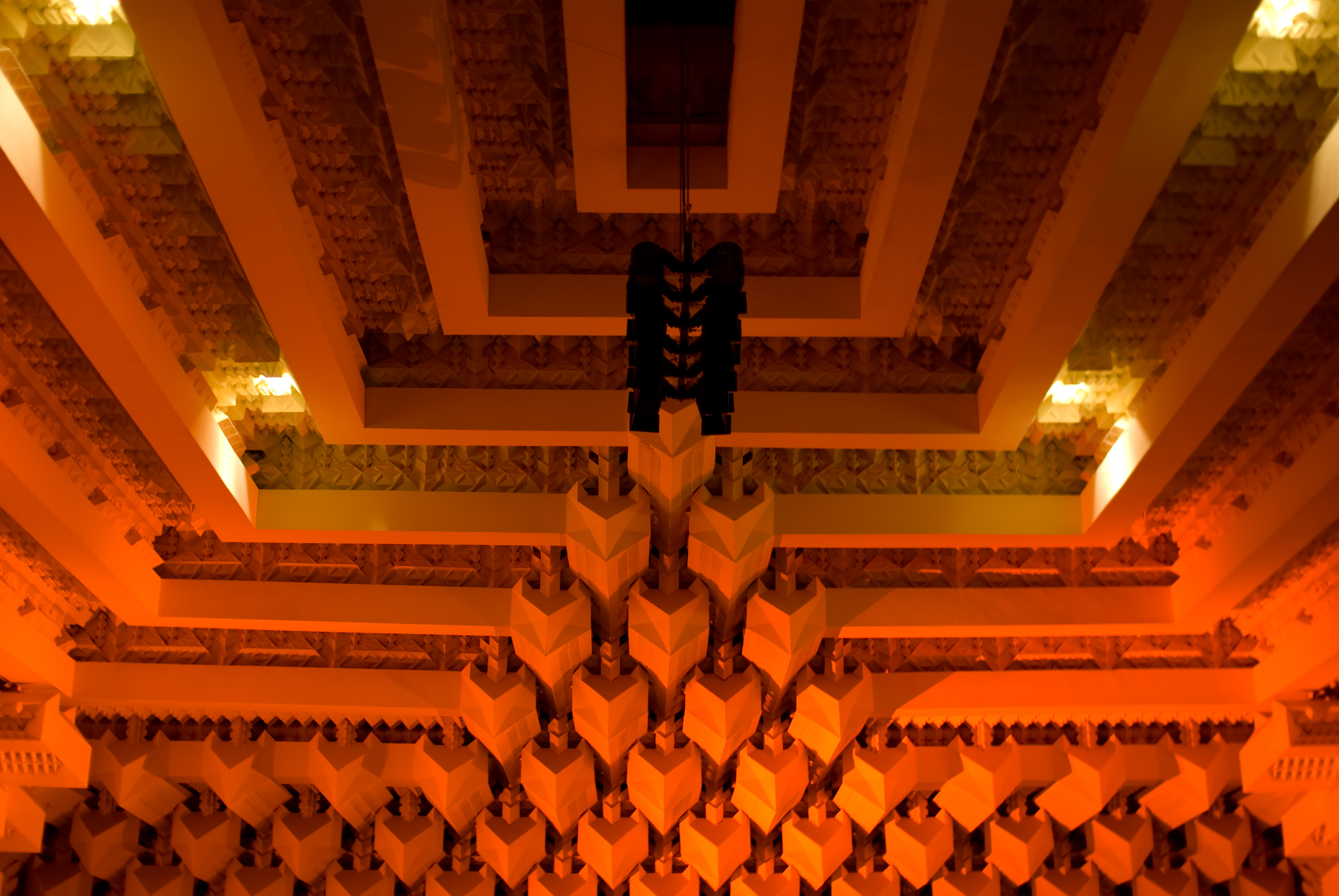
Ceiling detail of Building 113

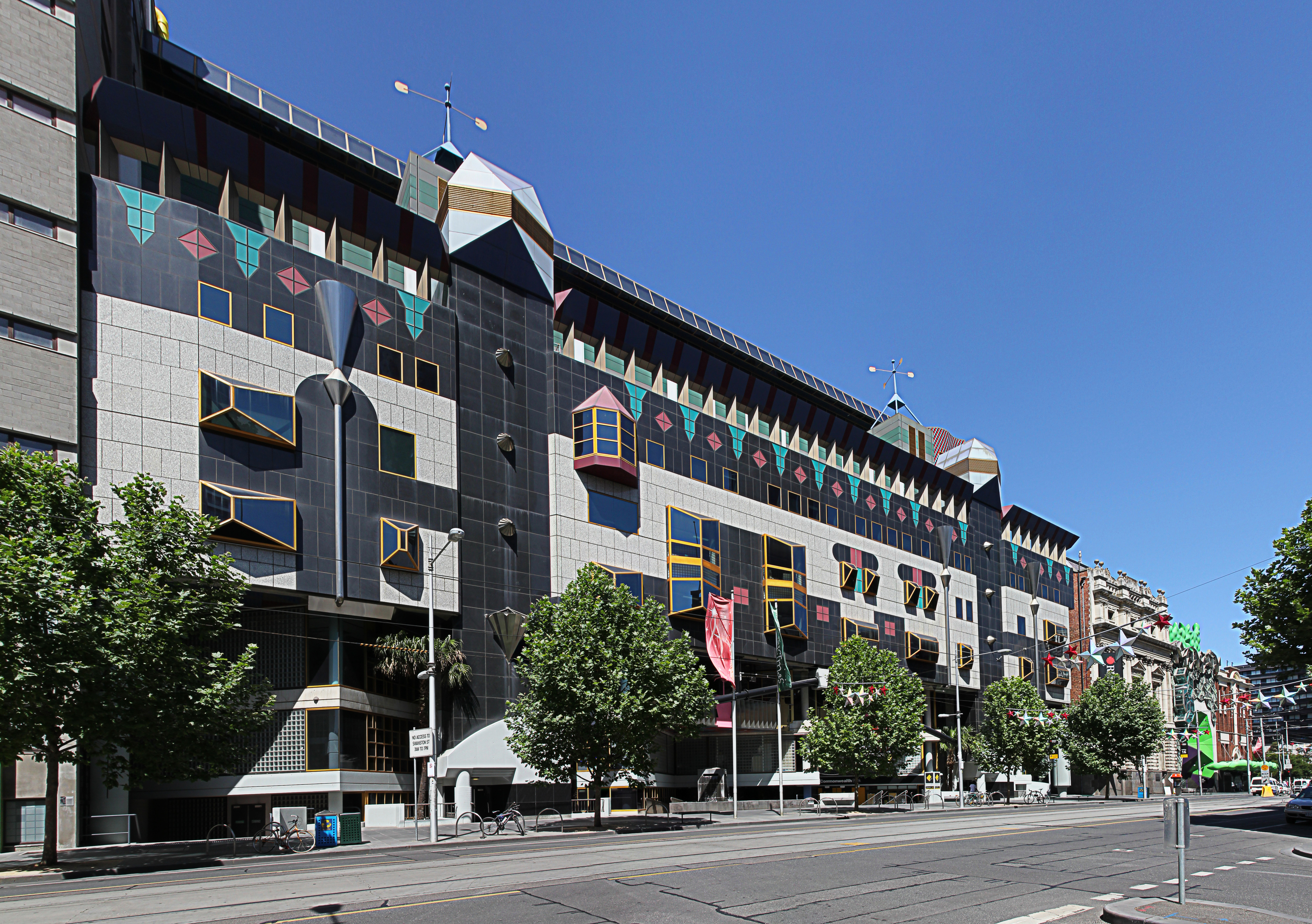
Building 8 from Swanston Street

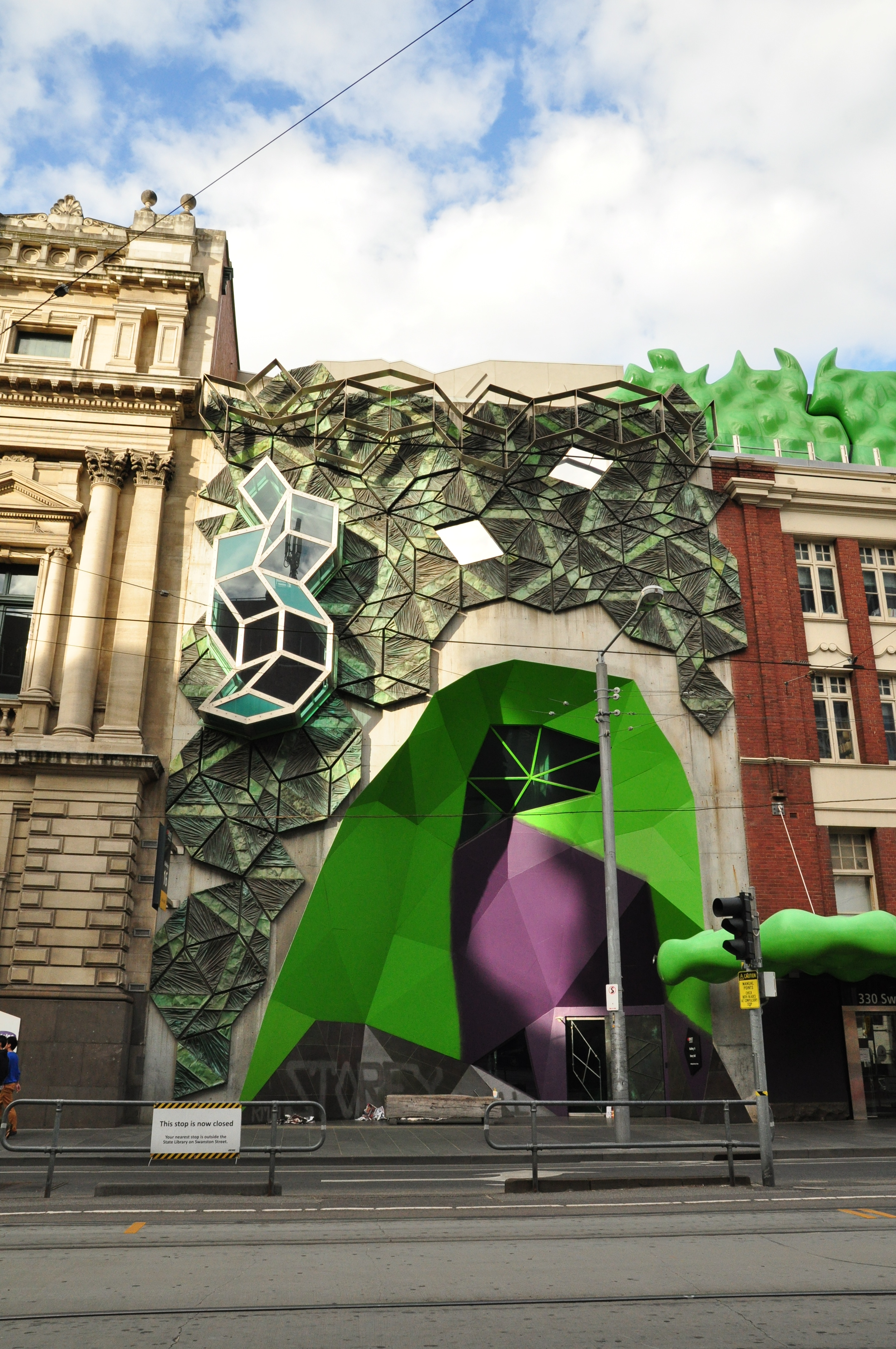
Building 16 [annex]

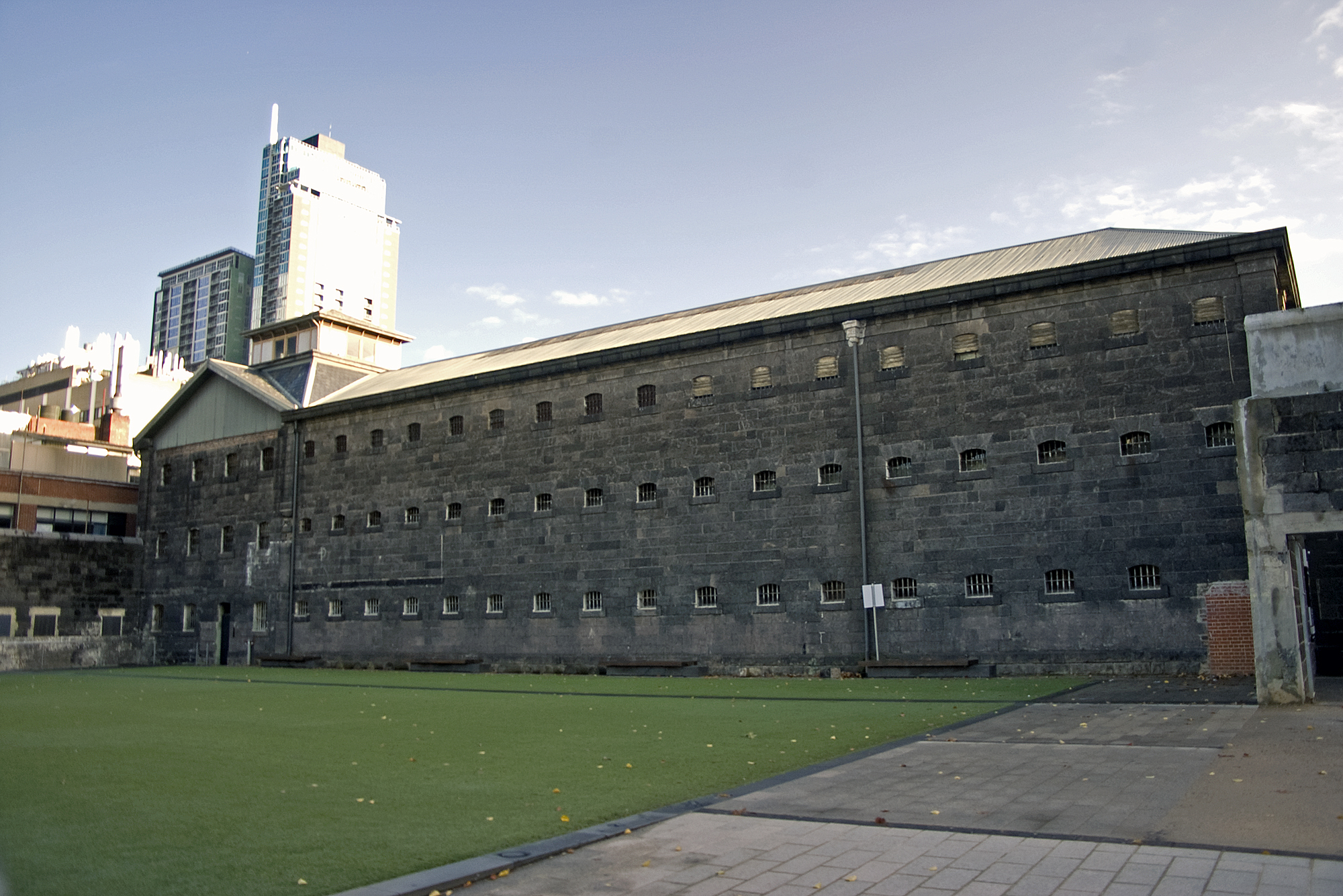
Lawn in Alumni Courtyard and adjoining gaol cellblock museum

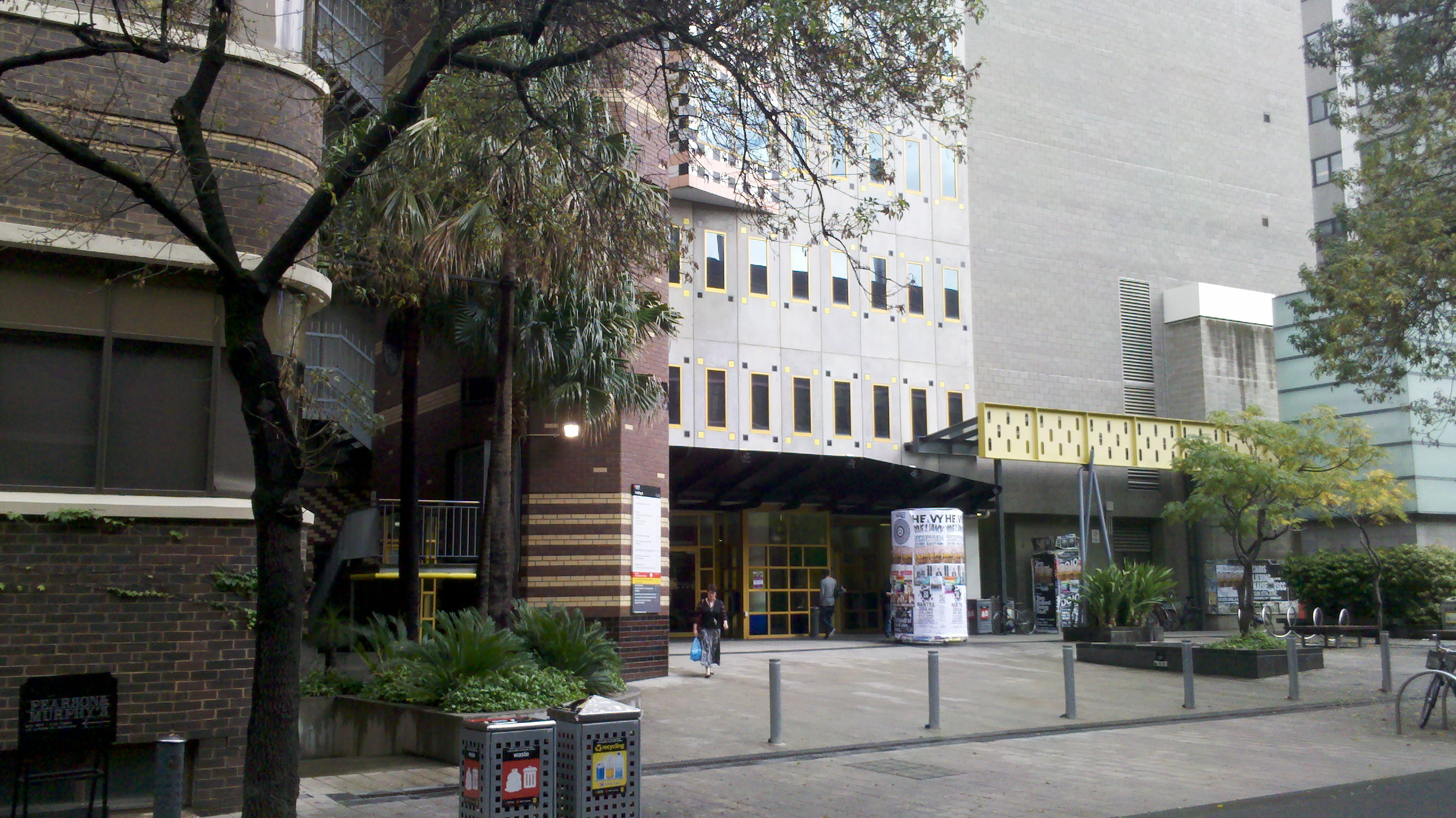
Southern end of Bowen Terrace

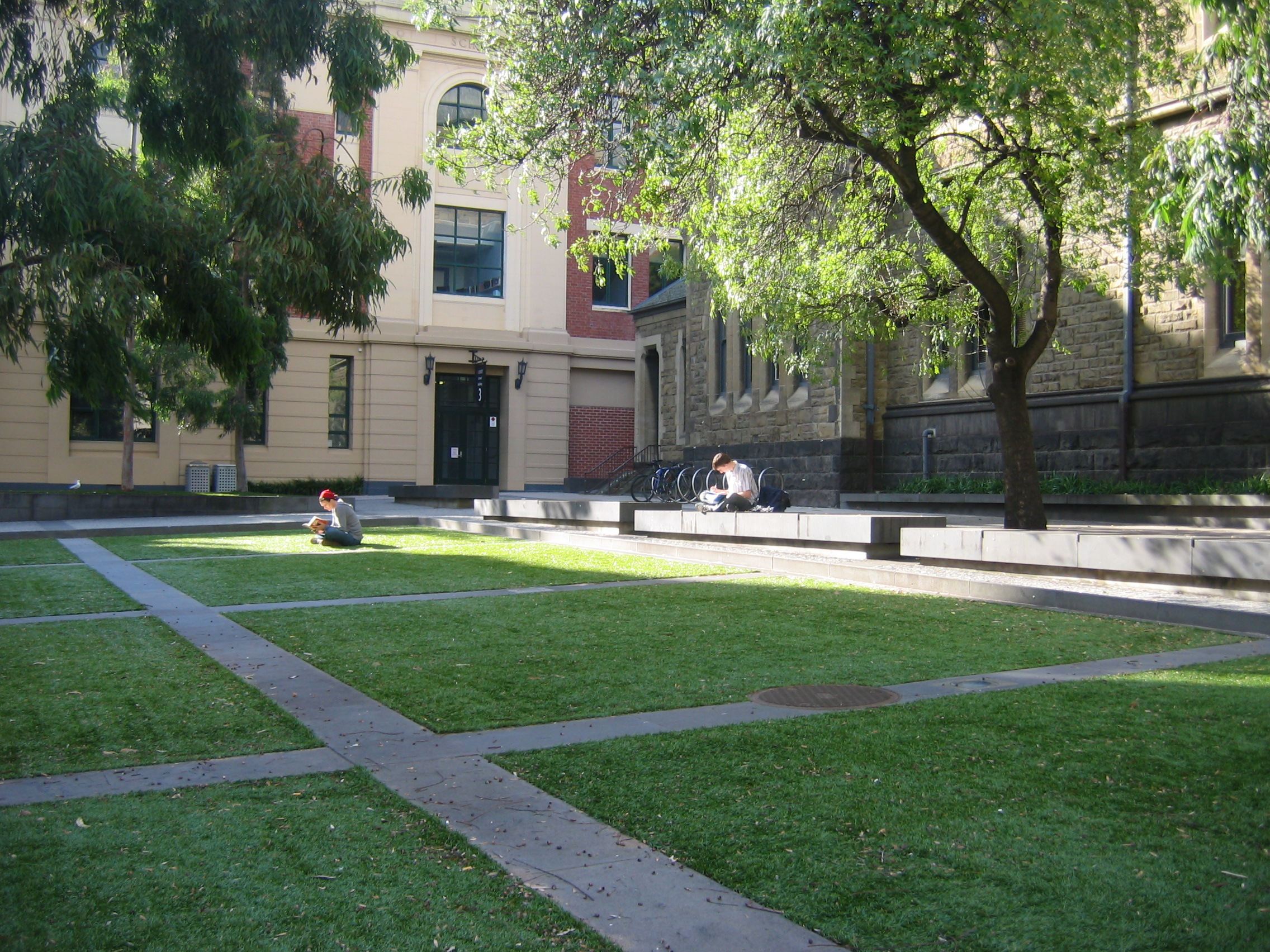
Ellis Court

=== Early ===
RMIT Building 1 (Francis Ormond Building):
Building 1 was constructed as the Working Men's College (antecedent of the present-day RMIT). Located on the corner of Bowen Street and La Trobe Street, it was RMIT's first building. The three-story Gothic Revival building is in the Scottish Baronial-style with Second Empire-inspired roof detailing. Its design was a result of an 1883 competition won by architects Leonard Terry, Percy Oakden and Nahum Barnet. It is constructed of brick and faced with a finely-worked Barrabool sandstone and Waurn Ponds stone dressings.

Stage 1 (Bowen Street Wing) was constructed between 1885 and 1886 at a cost of £10,600. The founder of the college, grazier and politician Francis Ormond, donated an initial £5,000 towards funding its construction on the provision the public match his donation. Ormond's cause was promoted in The Age newspaper by the journalist and Melbourne Public Library trustee Charles Pearson. The initial donation was matched through the fundraising efforts of Melbourne Trades Hall members, after the cause was taken up by its secretary William Murphy.

The inauguration of the college took place on 6 May 1887, in front of dignitaries and a large audience, at the Melbourne Town Hall. The inaugural address was delivered by the state Premier Duncan Gillies. The college was officially opened to enrollments on 4 June 1887. Pearson gave the first lecture at the college, and Oakden ran the colony's first architecture class. Over 200 enrolments were taken in its first week of operation, and later grew to over 2000 by 1889 – requiring additional teaching space to be constructed.

Stage 2 (La Trobe Street Wing) was constructed between 1890 and 1892 at a cost of £13,700. The 1883 design of the wing was redeveloped by Oakden, along with his new partners George Addison and Henry Kemp, and included more overt stone dressings. The addition of the building's prominent donjon tower is attributed to Kemp. Construction was financed by the bequest of Ormond, who had died the previous year. A full-scale bronze statue of Ormond by sculptor Percival Ball was erected outside the building in 1897.

The period interiors of the La Trobe Street Wing were damaged by fire in 1953, and were subsequently remodelled. The entire interior of the building was later refurbished between 2008 and 2010 to a design by architect Peter Elliot, at a cost of A$15 million. It included a reintroduction of period interior features as well as the creation of a café in the rear courtyard of the building and a lawned common area. The café is named Pearson & Murphy's.

Notably, the building refurbishment restored its elaborate 9 m high vaulted and hammerbeam roofs and the Romanesque semicircular Council Chamber. Following the refurbishment, it became only the second 19th century building to be awarded a five star rating by the Green Building Council of Australia. Its credentials include solar power generation, a rain water harvesting system and storage tanks under the lawn.

The building was classified by the National Trust in 1972, and placed on the Victorian Heritage Register in 2008. Along with the Gothic Revival former Melbourne Magistrates' Court (now Building 20), it is considered to create the best "European medieval revival streetscape" in Victoria.

Building 1 is now the administrative centre of RMIT, and the home of its Chancellery and Council.

RMIT Building 2 (Old Arts School):
Building 2 was constructed as an applied arts school. It is located opposite Building 1 on the adjacent corner of Bowen Street and La Trobe Street. The four-story building is Utilitarian in design – like that of British Industrial architecture of the era. It was designed by the state public works department under the chief architect George Watson. Constructed between 1915 and 1916 at a cost of A£16,000, it is a rare example of pre-Modern form follows function. The state Governor Arthur Stanley was presented with a solid gold key to officially open the building in 1917. The key is now held by Museum Victoria.

Building 2 now houses part of the RMIT School of Art.

RMIT Building 3 (Kernot Building):
Building 3 was constructed as the Kernot Engineering School. It is located on the eastern side of Bowen Street, beside Building 1 and Ellis Court, near the La Trobe Street entrance. Originally three stories, it is a Greek Revival-inspired building adapted in the Palazzo-style. It was designed by the state public works department under the chief architect E. Evan Smith.

Constructed between 1930 and 1931, at a cost of A£40,000, it was named after the Kernot brothers, William and Wilfred. Both brothers were engineers and served as president of the Working Men's College. The building was opened by prominent army general and engineer John Monash in 1931 (in what is reported to have been his last public function before he died later that year).

The building was constructed on the site of a former cell block and walled yard of the neighbouring Melbourne Gaol (which ceased operation in 1924). During demolishing and excavation works on the site in 1929, workers discovered what was believed to be the grave of notorious bushranger Ned Kelly (who was hanged at the gaol in 1880). It was reported that, when the remains were exhumed, nearby students of the college rushed the site and seized bones from the grave. The bones were later returned or recovered by the state penal department, and the remains were reinterred at the Metropolitan Gaol at Pentridge (now Coburg).

Between 1998 and 2002, the entire interior of the building was refurbished and a fourth story added to a contemporary design by architect Peter Elliot, at a cost of A$13.4 million. The new level also connected to Building 5 over a laneway leading to University Way. It replaced excess Royal Australian Air Force huts which had been relocated to the roof of the building after World War II – in order to relieve a shortage of classrooms. The RMIT School of Aerospace, Mechanical and Manufacturing Engineering moved from the building in 1998 (which ended 67 years of engineering education in the building).

Building 3 now houses the RMIT School of Applied Sciences.

RMIT Building 4 (Old Trades School):
Building 4 was constructed as a trade school in 1890 to accommodate a growing student population of over 2000. It is located on the western side of Bowen Street, near the La Trobe Street entrance, and was the second building of the campus. The four-story Gothic Revival building is an adaptation of the Tudor Gothic-style. It was designed by architects Oakden, Addison and Kemp who also worked on Building 1. Like Kemp's previous work of the day, the building is surmounted with a castellated tower and spire. Its leadlight windows are in an unusual perpendicular design and utilise cathedral glass in the Arts and Crafts tradition.

The building originally housed a steam engine-driven electric generator in its basement. It was one of only a few in Melbourne during the 1890s and also powered the formerly gas-lit Building 1.

Building 4 now houses part of the RMIT School of Art.

RMIT Building 9 (Old Radio School):
Building 9 was constructed as an electrical and radio communications school – toward the end of the Interwar period. It is located on the corner of Bowen Street and Franklin Street. Originally three stories, it is a Streamline Style Moderne building designed by the state public works department under the chief architect Percy Everett. It was constructed (and subsequently extended for World War II) between 1938 and 1942 of manganese brick.

During World War II, over 5,300 Royal Australian Air Force personnel trained to be radar operators and radio mechanics in the building. The aeronautical engineering school (antecedent to the present-day RMIT School of Aerospace, Mechanical and Manufacturing Engineering) was also established behind the building at this time (now Building 15).

Two additional stories were added to the building between 2008 and 2009 to a design by architect Peter Elliot, and the entire interior of the building's above-ground stories were refurbished. Its basement interiors were refurbished to house media suites and studio space between 2011 and 2012.

The building was placed on the Victorian Heritage Register in 2008 as a significant work of Percy Everett, and for being "one of the few large public buildings designed in the streamline horizontal Moderne style" in Victoria. Together with Building 5 (Old Chemistry School) and Building 7 (Old Metallurgy School) it forms Everett's suite of European Moderne buildings on the campus.

Building 9 now houses the RMIT School of Media and Communication.

=== Acquired ===
RMIT Building 11 (Spiritual Centre):
Building 11 is a group of connected buildings that were once part of the Melbourne Gaol. Located at the corner of Franklin Street and University Way, the group includes the gaol gatehouse, service wing, bathhouse and chapel buildings. Constructed between 1860 and 1861 of Coburg bluestone, the mostly two-story buildings are in a restrained style. They were designed by the colonial public works department under chief architect Henry Ginn and based on Joshua Jebb's Pentonville prison style. The chapel is attributed to H.A. Williams and its austere-Italianate facade and bellcot are attributed to J.J. Clark and Gustav Joachimi.

The group of buildings are connected by a central courtyard. Two smaller courtyards are also located on the east and west sides of the chapel. A curiosity of the chapel is the Port Jackson fig tree (sp. ficus rubiginosa) growing atop the wall in the western courtyard.

The gaol ceased its operations in 1924, and ownership of the remaining group of buildings was transferred to the neighbouring Emily McPherson College (now Building 13) in 1927 – which was also constructed over a demolished area of the gaol. Most of the remaining gaol buildings were demolished during the 1930s – to make way for the Kernot Engineering School (now Building 3). The only remaining cell block of the gaol which fronts Russell Street (which is not a part of the Building 11 group) was left abandoned.

During World War II, the disused cellblock was reopened and as a military prison for soldiers who went Absent Without Leave (AWOL). During this time, a wall was constructed in the eastern courtyard to ensure students were separated from the inmates. After the war the cell block was used as a storage facility for the Victorian Police force. The college's group of buildings had their interiors remodelled by architect Rod Macdonald of Eggleston, Macdonald and Secomb in 1974. Emily McPherson College amalgamated with RMIT in 1979, after which the buildings were used as art studios.

The enclosed balconies of the building were restored in 1990 (to a design that dates from 1927). The central courtyard was landscaped in 1994, and the war-time wall in the eastern courtyard was demolished around the same time. In 2007, the chapel interior was remodelled by architect Khalid Bouden of Desypher as a multifaith space and offices.

The building was classified by the National Trust and placed on the Victorian Heritage Register in 1958. Together, the group of buildings are culturally significant for being "evidence of one of the early gaols and the oldest surviving penal establishment" in Victoria, and are archaeologically significant as they "contain remnants of the original gaol structures and the site of the original burials of prisoners".

Building 11 now houses the RMIT Spiritual Centre and Chaplaincy. The National Trust have operated the remaining cell block as a museum since 1972.

RMIT Building 13 (Emily McPherson Building):
Building 13 was constructed as the Emily McPherson College of Domestic Economy (which amalgamated with RMIT in 1979). It is located on the corner of Franklin Street and Victoria Street. The four-story Neoclassical building is in the Beaux Arts-style with a Neo-Grec décor. It was designed by the state public works department under chief architect E. Evan Smith. It was constructed between 1925 and 1926 of brick with a cement render and features a dominant Doric portico.

It was constructed on the site of the former governor's residence as well as parts of the panopticon-like exercise yards and watchtower of the neighbouring Melbourne Gaol. After the gaol ceased operations in 1924, the ownership of its former gatehouse, service wing, bathhouse and chapel buildings were transferred to the college. The buildings were primarily used for fashion and food technology classes (and are now collectively known as Building 11).

The college was named after the wife of businessman and politician William McPherson, who donated a A£25,000 share towards its construction. It was opened by Emily McPherson and the Duchess of York, Elizabeth Bowes-Lyon (later the Queen Mother) in 1927. A crowd of over 5000 people, including dignitaries and officials, gathered outside the portico to witness the opening ceremony.

Following the official proceedings, Ethel Osborne (who had invited the Duchess to open the college) presented her with the first ever honorary diploma from the college. Osborne declared that "Her Royal Highness had set all Australians an example of home life". Upon accepting, the Duchess replied "it will always be a delightful memento but one of which I am afraid I am not worthy!"

The Ethel Margaret McPherson Wing of the building was constructed between 1949 and 1950. The wing, which fronts Franklin Street – next to the gatehouse of Building 11, is sympathetic in design to the original building. It was designed by the state public works department under chief architect Percy Everett. It was named after the wife of McPherson's son William Jr. It was opened by Mary Herring, the wife of the state Lieutenant Governor.

Between 2007 and 2010, the building was refurbished to a design by architect Kai Chen of Lovell Chen. The building's exterior was restored to its original 1927 design, and its interiors redeveloped for executive education, at a cost of A$23.2 million. It was also detached from its rear connection to Building 11, in order to create a walkway via its eastern courtyard to Russell Street.

The building was classified by the National Trust in 1979, and placed on the Victorian Heritage Register in 2008. It is architecturally significant as "a distinctive neoclassical building", and historically significant as "a reminder of earlier philosophies of educational provision especially for girls and young women".

Building 13 now houses the RMIT Graduate School of Business and Law.

RMIT Building 16 (Storey Hall):
Building 16 was constructed as the meeting hall of the Ancient Order of Hibernians' Australasian Catholic Benefit Society. Located at 342-348 Swanston Street, RMIT first leased the building in 1947, to house its Correspondence Branch, and later purchased it in 1957. The three-story Neoclassical building was designed by the architect W.B. Tappin of Tappin, Gilbert and Dennehy. Its facade features Ionic temple windows, framed by Corinthian columns that support a decorative entablature. It was constructed between 1884 and 1887 of brick faced with sandstone and a Malmsbury bluestone base.

The £25,000 cost of the building was raised through the fundraising efforts of Hibernian-Australasian Catholic Benefit Society members. The building was opened in 1887 by the Catholic Archbishop of Melbourne Thomas Carr. Upon completion, the Hibernian Hall was the largest private hall in Melbourne and the second largest generally only to the Town Hall.

The hall was built during a time when fraternal and friendly societies were at their peak in Melbourne. Other former society halls that exist in the general campus area include those of the Ancient Order of Druids (opposite Building 16 on Swanston Street), Independent Order of Odd Fellows (opposite Building 13 on Victoria Street) and the Ancient Order of Foresters (now Building 24).

It ceased operations as the Hibernian Hall in 1903, after which it was acquired by the controversial evangelical preacher John Alexander Dowie who used as a Zionist Tabernacle. It was a site of protest when Dowie (who started his religious career in Australia) returned to Melbourne in 1904 – at the height of his notoriety. Following his death in 1907, Dowie's successor Wilbur Glenn Voliva (former superintendent of Zionism in Australia) sold the hall in order to settle debts associated with Dowie's theocratic Zion City in the United States.

It was acquired by businessman Charles Bright of Gibbs, Bright and Co., who renamed it the Guild Hall. It was leased to entertainer and early Melbourne cinema entrepreneur Thomas Sangston, who used it for his vaudeville company.

Building 16 is now home to RMIT Gallery.

RMIT Building 19 (former Melbourne City Watch-House):

RMIT Building 20 (former Melbourne Magistrates' Court):

RMIT Building 22 (Singer Building):

RMIT Building 24 (Forrester's Hall):

RMIT Building 113 (Capitol Theatre):

=== Recent ===
RMIT Building 8 (Union House):

RMIT Building 16 (Storey Hall) [annex]:

RMIT Building 80 (Swanston Academic Building):

RMIT Building 100 (Design Hub):

== Open space and common areas ==
Alumni Courtyard and Belvedere:

Bowen Street and Bowen Terrace:

Ellis Court:

University Lawn:

== See also ==
- RMIT University
