= Anne Johnstone (teacher) =

Dr Anne Johnstone FTGN
- Education: University of Melbourne (PhD); University of Pennsylvania (MAPP)
- Occupation: Head Of School: Cranbrook School
- Years active: 2026–Present
- Predecessor: Nicholas Sampson

Anne Johnstone is an Australian teacher who is the current head of Cranbrook School in Sydney. Johnstone is Cranbrook School's first female head of school and ninth overall head of school. She was formally inducted as the ninth head of school in a ceremony on 8 September 2025. She has overseen the commencement of coeducation at Cranbrook, which welcomed girls for the first time in 2026.

Johnstone was previously principal at Ravenswood School for Girls. She served at the school from 2016–2025. She was honoured at the end of her tenure by the new sports and wellbeing centre being named for her. She was succeeded by Sue Floro.

Prior to her time at Ravenswood School For Girls, Johnstone was the principal of Seymour College in Adelaide. Prior to that, Johnstone served at St Catherine's School in Sydney as a history and English teacher, head of junior school, head of senior school and deputy headmistress.

== Awards and honours ==
Johnstone has received a variety of awards and honours in relation to her excellence in education. In 2026 she was recognised as a Fellow of the Teachers Guild of New South Wales. In 2025, Johnstone was recognised with the Educators Most Influential Educator Award. She was also recognised with this award in 2024 and 2023. In 2024 during her time at Ravenswood School she was awarded Australian Principal of The Year. In 2022, Johnstone was awarded the Phyllis Evans Medal by the Teachers Guild of New South Wales.

== Education ==
Johnstone attended St Catherine's School, Sydney and completed her HSC. She initially trained and studied as a lawyer receiving her Bachelor of Arts (BA) and her Bachelor of Laws with honours (LLB) from Macquarie University in 1997. In 2002, she retrained as a teacher and received her Graduate Diploma of Education (GradDipEd) from the University of New England. In 2017, she continued her studies and achieved a Masters of Applied Positive Psychology (MAPP) from the University of Pennsylvania. Johnstone completed her Doctorate in Philosophy (PhD) from the University of Melbourne in 2024.
