= RMIT Building 11 =

Coordinates: 37°48′29″S 144°57′55″E

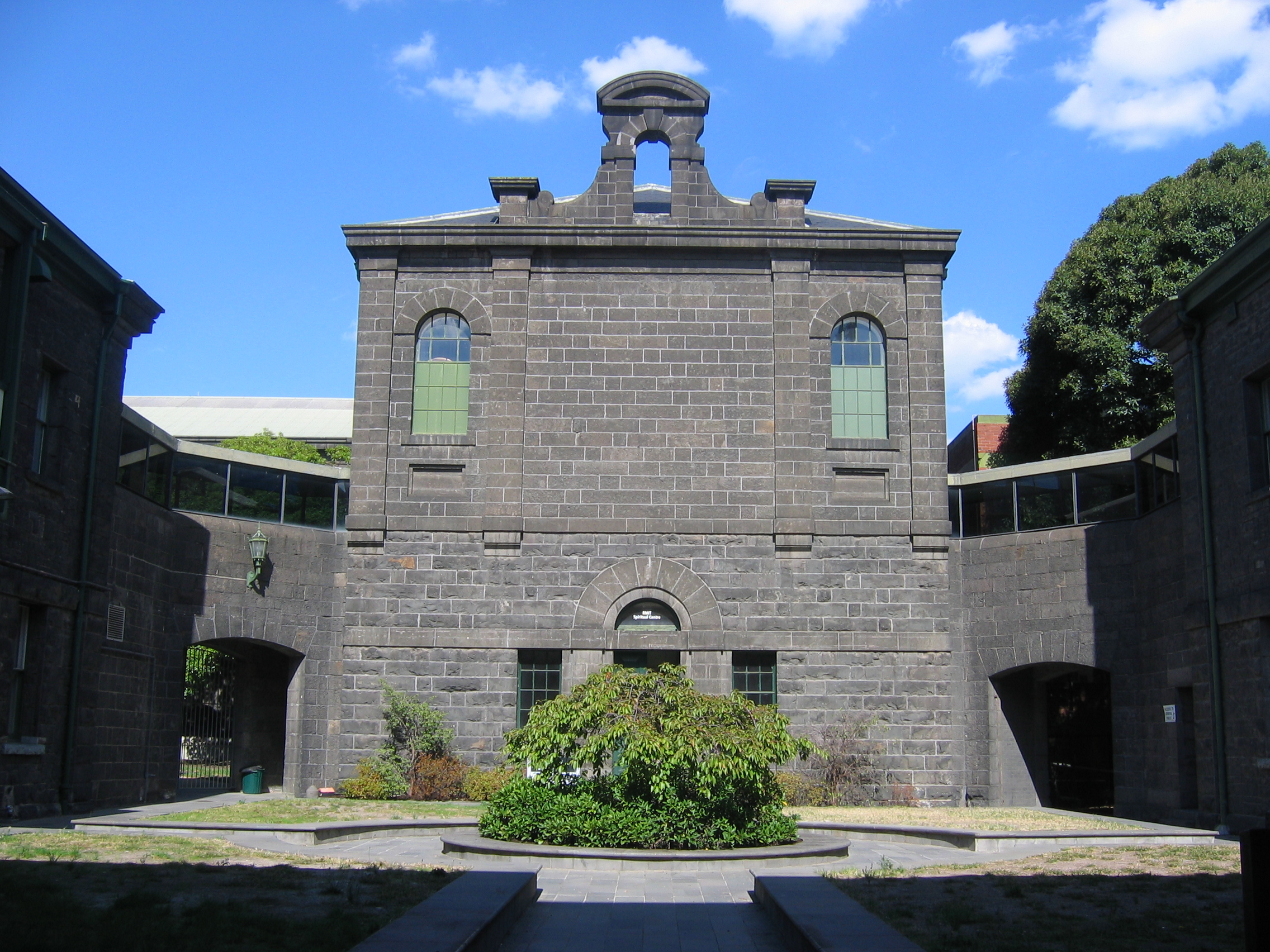
- Spiritual Centre chapel and courtyard from the Franklin Street entrance
- Interactive map of the RMIT Building 11 area

General information
- Type: Education, worship
- Architectural style: Italianate
- Location: Corner Franklin and Victoria streets, Melbourne, 377 Russell Street, Melbourne, Victoria, Australia
- Construction started: 1860
- Completed: 1861
- Owner: RMIT

Design and construction
- Architects: H.A. Williams, J.J. Clark and Gustav Joachimi
- Architecture firm: Victorian Public Works Department

Renovating team
- Architect: Khalid Bouden
- Renovating firm: Desypher

RMIT Building 11, also informally known as RMIT Spiritual Centre, is a building located at the City campus of the Royal Melbourne Institute of Technology (RMIT University), and is part of the Old Melbourne Gaol. The centre is a place for students to practise mindful meditation, which is an activity organised by the RMIT Chaplaincy Service.

== History ==
The building was built in 1860 as the chapel of the Old Melbourne Gaol. It was part of the "North Wing" of the gaol, and today is one of the few remaining facilities of the complex. It became part of RMIT after the gaol's decommissioning in 1929. The other remaining facilities include: the main entrance gates, the governor's residence, female hospital, a service wing and a bathhouse (collectively known today, along with the chapel, as "RMIT Building 11"), and the "East Block" (currently utilised as a museum). The "West Block" of the gaol was demolished to make way for an RMIT expansion, circa 1910, and the large circular panopticon watchtower and male exercise yard were demolished in 1927 for the construction of the Emily McPherson College of Domestic Economy (now also part of RMIT).

The building is designated a "notable building" by the Melbourne City Council, and is classified by the National Trust of Australia (Victoria) and the Victorian Heritage Register.

== Gallery ==
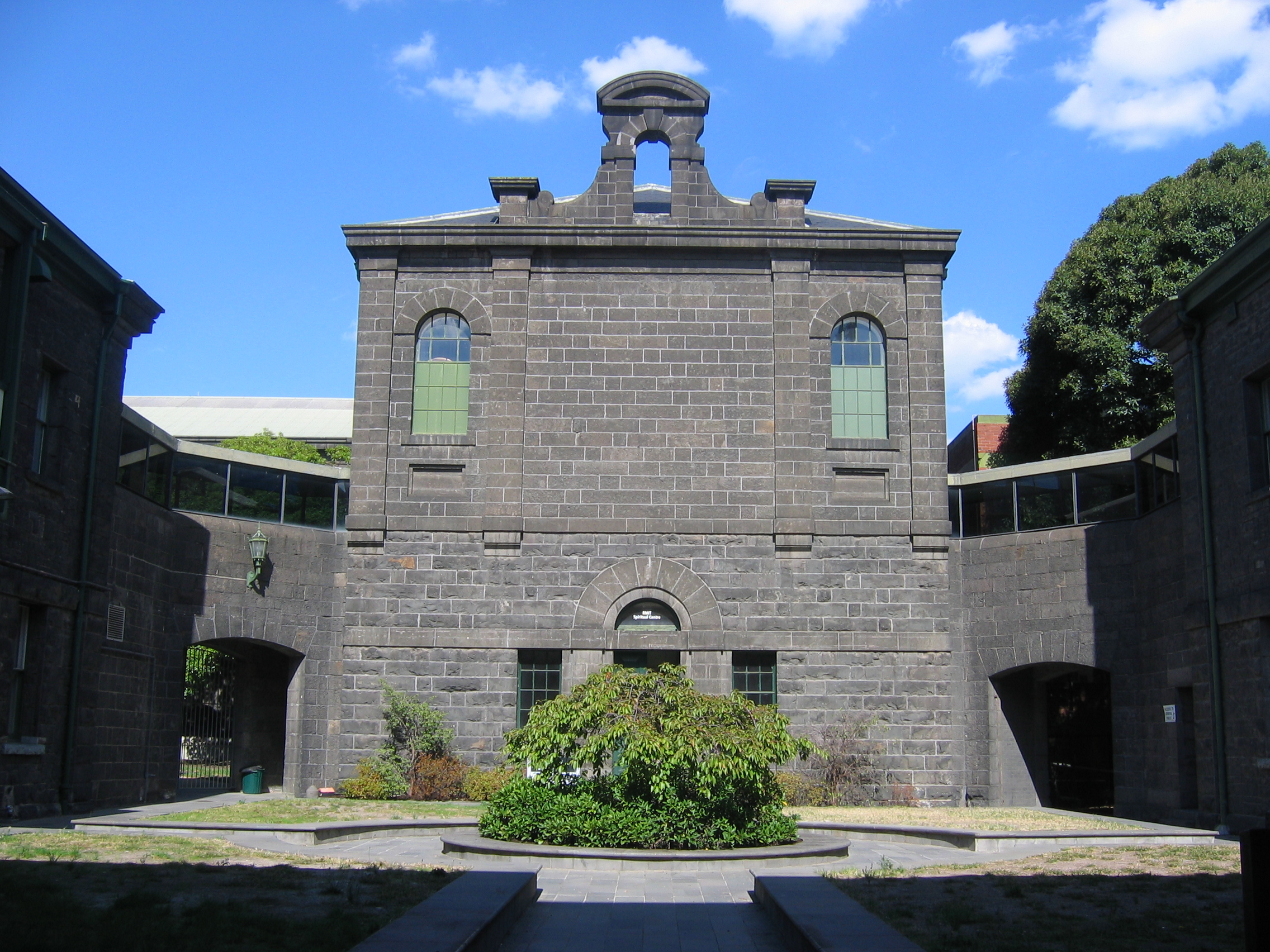
Main chapel of the RMIT Spiritual Centre

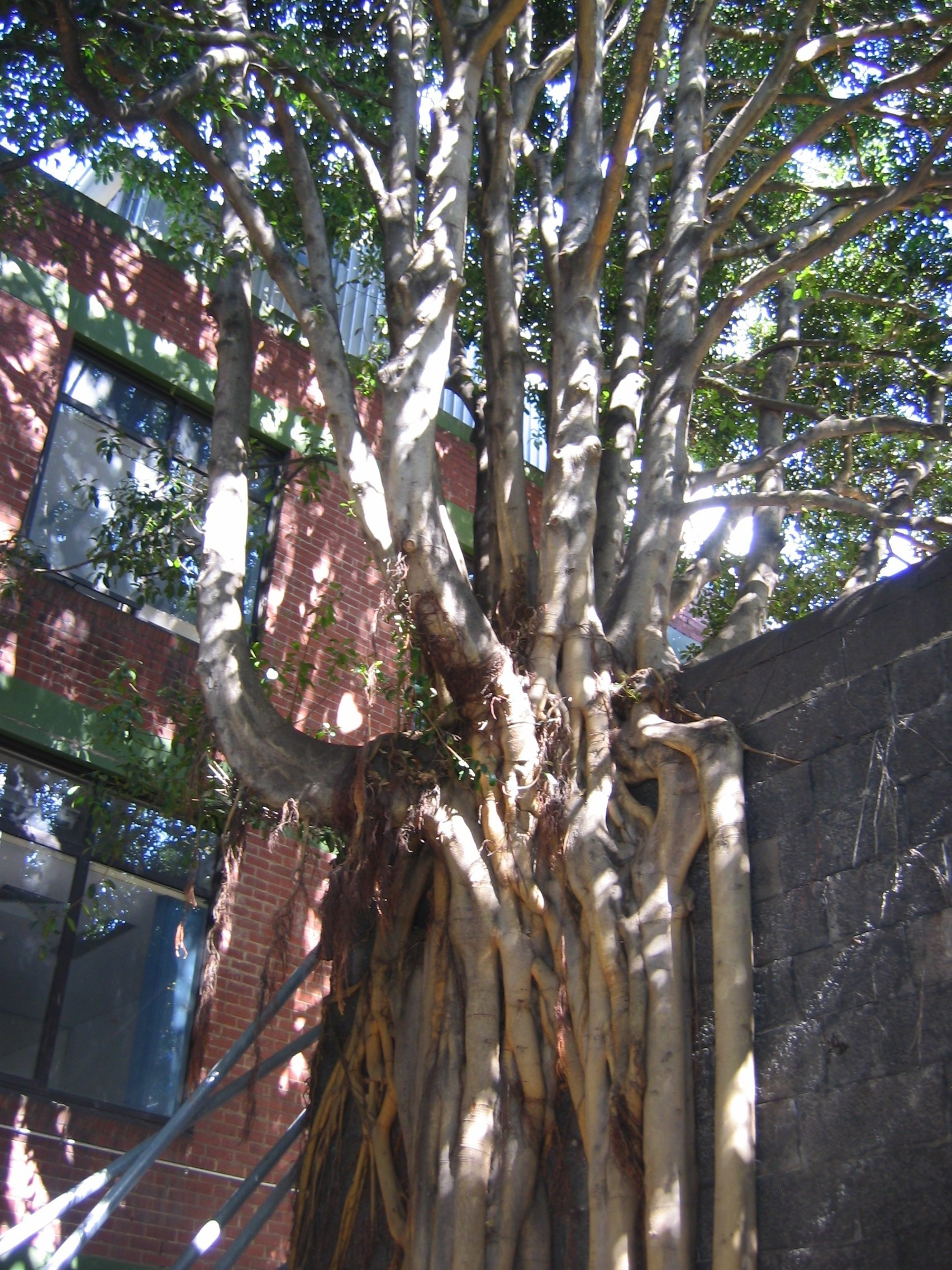
Banyan tree growing over a wall in a courtyard of the centre

== See also ==
- Old Melbourne Gaol, to which the chapel was a former part of
- RMIT City, the campus of RMIT where the Spiritual Centre is located
