= St Catherine's School, Waverley =

St Catherine's School Sydney
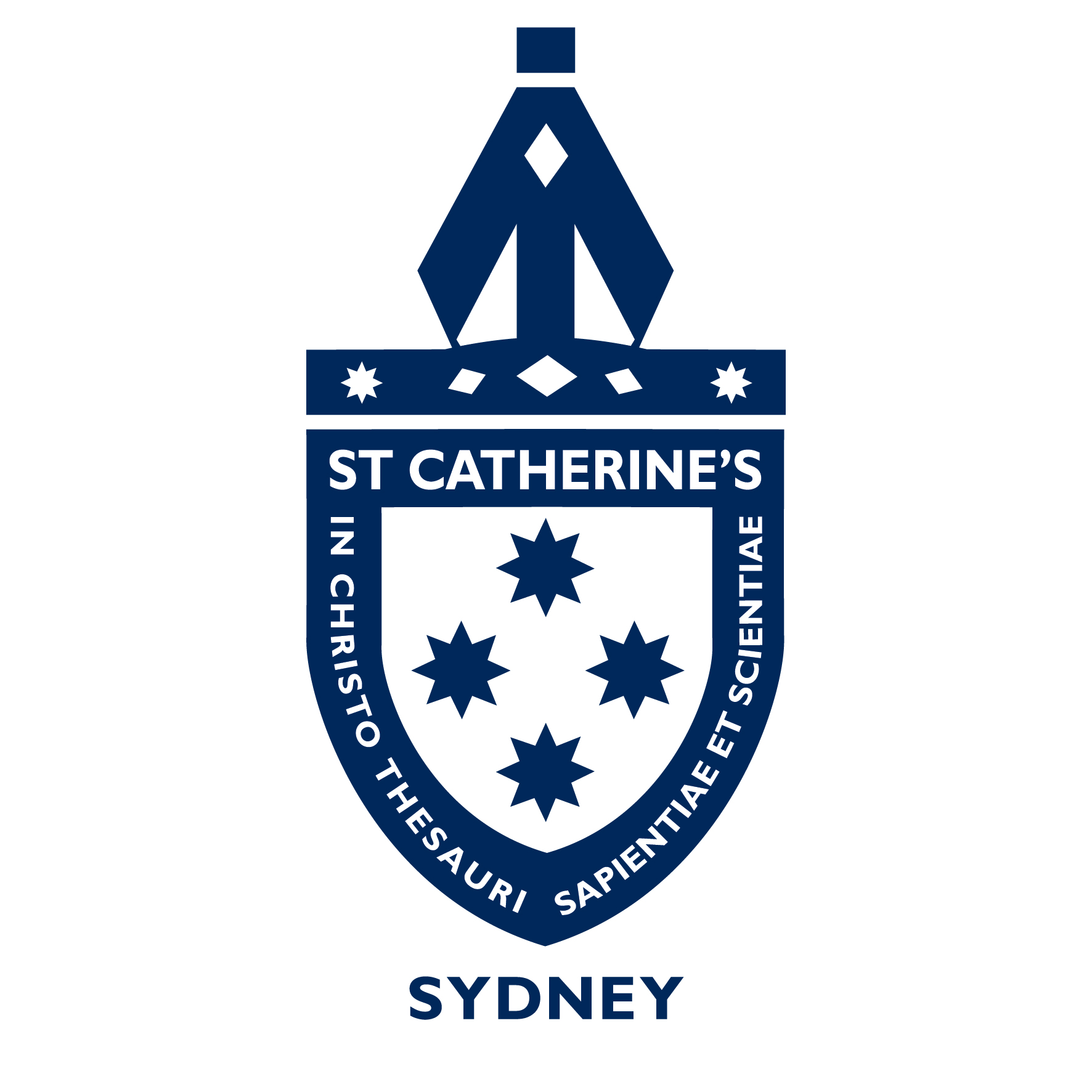

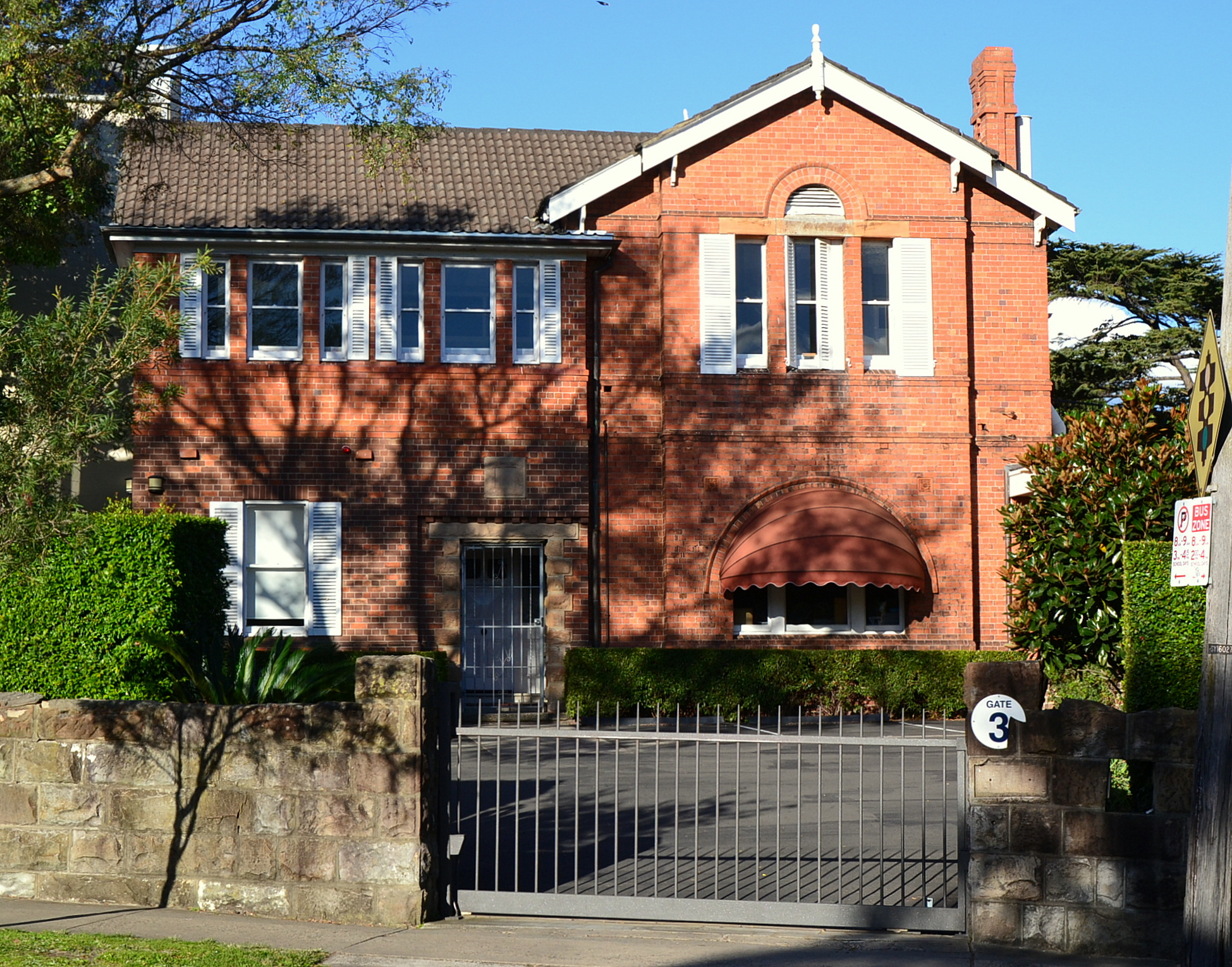
- The college in 2013

Location
- 26 Albion Street; Waverley, Sydney, 2024; Australia; 33°54′15″S 151°15′19″E

Information
- Former name: St Catherine's Clergy Daughters School
- Type: Private Anglican single-sex primary and secondary day and boarding
- Denomination: Anglicanism
- Established: 1856; 170 years ago
- Founder: Jane Sophia Barker
- Chairman: Simon Roberts
- Headmistress: Judith Poole
- Staff: ~120
- Years: K–12
- Gender: Girls
- Enrolment: c. 1,000
- Area: 2 hectares (5 acres)
- Campus type: Suburban
- Nickname: St Cath's
- Affiliations: Alliance of Girls' Schools Australasia; Junior School Heads Association of Australia; Association of Heads of Independent Schools of Australia; Australian Boarding Schools' Association; Association of Heads of Independent Girls' Schools
- Website: www.stcatherines.nsw.edu.au

St Catherine's School (commonly referred to as St Cath's) is a private Anglican junior and senior day and boarding school, located in Waverley, an eastern suburb of Sydney, Australia.

Established in 1856 as a school for the daughters of clergy, St Catherine's is the oldest Anglican girls' school in Australia. It is also the oldest private girls' school in Australia. It is a non-selective school, and currently caters for about 1,000 girls from Year K to Year 12, including 70 boarders.

The school is affiliated with the Alliance of Girls' Schools Australasia (AGSA), the Junior School Heads Association of Australia, the Association of Heads of Independent Schools of Australia, the Australian Boarding Schools' Association (ABSA), and is a founding member of the Association of Heads of Independent Girls' Schools.

St Catherine's has been reviewed by the Good Schools Guide International.

== History ==
St Catherine's School traces its origins to 1855, when Jane Barker, wife of Frederic Barker, second Archbishop of Sydney, decided to establish a school for the daughters of the clergy. Barker and her husband had travelled throughout New South Wales, and realised that the poor stipends of the clergy in country areas meant that their daughters could not benefit from a good education. Within five months, Barker had raised enough money to secure a premises in Point Piper Road (now Jersey Road), Edgecliff, and had hired Ms Loftus to run the St Catherine's Clergy Daughters School. Barker wished for her school to be modelled on Casterton School, the school attended by the Brontë sisters, who were themselves the daughters of a poor clergyman. The Clergy Daughters School was officially opened in its temporary location on 5 March 1856.

Shortly after the school's opening, Barker was able to secure a land grant of 5 acres (2 ha) near Waverley, and began to look towards the creation of a small missionary settlement, including the Clergy Daughters' School, a church, parsonage and a village school. In September 1857, the foundation stone of the new School was laid, and in 1859, the sandstone building which remains the focus of the School today, was completed. Barker continued to be closely involved with the fledgling Clergy Daughters' school until her death in 1876.

When enrolments began to decline during the depression years of 1891–1895, day girls were admitted to the school for the first time. The principal, Ms Darling, also introduced the first school uniform during this time, in the form of an olive green dress.

In 1933, the house system was introduced. After the Second World War, the swimming pool, a new assembly building and the junior school were added among other renovations. A new sports centre was opened in 2002.

== Houses ==
House	Date founded	Colour
Barker	1933	
Bronte	1933	
Casterton	1933	
Hulme-Moir	1987	
Patterson	2015	
Phillips	2015	
Sutherland	1987	

Barker was named after the Bishop and Mrs Barker, Casterton House after the school on which St Catherine's was modelled, and the third House was named Bronte as Charlotte Brontë had mentioned Casterton in Jane Eyre. Hulme-Moir and Sutherland were created in 1987.

== Headmistresses ==
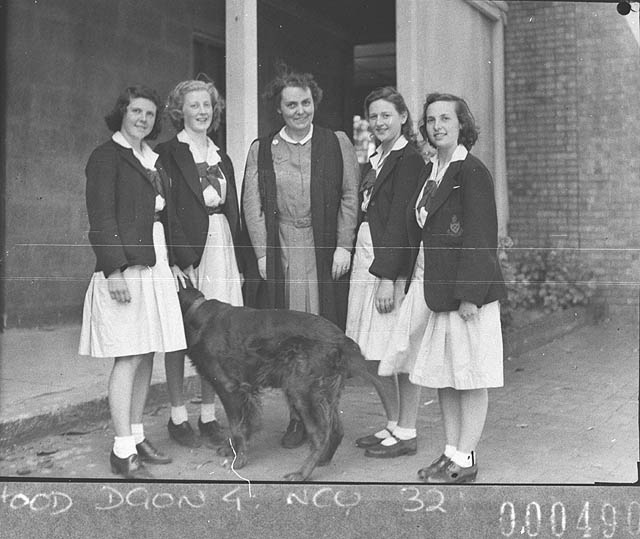
Headmistress and students, 1945

Ordinal	Officeholder	Term start	Term end	Time in office	Notes
1	Jane Sophie Barker	1856	1856	0 years	Founder
2	Miss Loftus	1856	1860	3–4 years	Lady Superintendent
3	Miss Law	1860	1883	22–23 years	Lady Superintendent
4	Helen Phillips	1884	1890	5–6 years	
5	Rebecca Darling	1891	1895	3–4 years	
6	Charlotte Fox	1895	1903	7–8 years	
7	Ellen Lenthall	1903	1934	30–31 years	
8	Isabel Hall	1935	1947	11–12 years	
9	Ella Mitchell	1948	1949	0–1 years	
10	Una Fitzhardinge	1950	1954	3–4 years	
11	Faith Patterson	1955	1987	31–32 years	
12	Jo Karaolis	1988	2000	11–12 years	
13	Lynne Stone	2001	2009	7–8 years	
14	Julie Townsend	2010	2023	15–16 years	
15	Judith Poole	2023	present		Acting interim head

== Campus ==
Since 1859 St Catherine's School has been situated on one suburban campus, currently 2 hectares (5 acres) in size and featuring a mix of 19th century and modern buildings, gardens and views to the Tasman Sea.

Some notable facilities of the college include the Jo Karaolis Sports Centre, with facilities for netball, tennis, basketball and gymnastics and school functions; the Dame Joan Sutherland Centre for the Performing Arts, featuring a drama theatre, recording studio, dance studio, band room and music practice and teaching areas; computing facilities in the Sutherland Centre; an Independent Learning Centre and Student Meeting Room; swimming pool; junior school and library; and Year 12 common room and senior school library; The Boarding House, uniform shop, delicatessen, museum, and playgrounds. After-school-care facilities are also on site.

== Notable staff and alumnae ==
Annie Mabel Sandes who had led the (Emily McPherson) College of Domestic Economy, in Melbourne, taught here when her married name was Mrs Clifton Smith. She taught domestic science and dressmaking from 1938 until she retired in 1944.

Former students of St Catherine's School are known as "Old Girls" and may elect to join the schools Alumni association, known as the "Old Girls' Union". The Old Girls' Union was established on 11 November 1898 by Charlotte Elizabeth Fox, the Headmistress at the time. At its foundation the aim of the union was to keep past pupils in contact with the school and promote its good, while also encouraging younger members to continue furthering their talents after graduation. Some notable Old Girls' of St Catherine's include:

Entertainment, media and the arts

- Eirene Mort – artist
- Mouche Phillips – actress
- Dame Joan Sutherland – operatic soprano
- Rachael Coopes – actress
- Miah Madden - actress

Medicine and science

- Una Lucy Fielding – pioneering neuroanatomist
- Tamara Davis – astrophysicist

Sport

- Gabi Simpson – netball
- Lizzie Welborn – surfing
- Amy Ridge – water polo

== See also ==
- List of Anglican schools in New South Wales
- Anglican education in Australia
- List of boarding schools in Australia
