= Annie Mabel Sandes =

Australian technical-college superintendent (1881 – 1966)

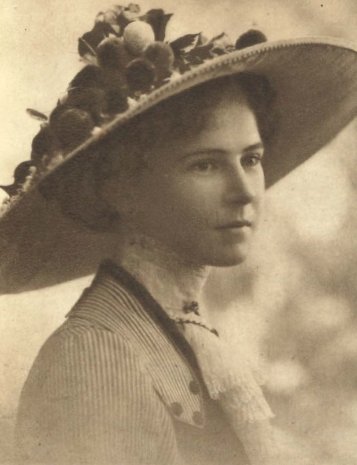
- Born: 3 December 1881; Cleveland, Queensland, Australia
- Died: 19 June 1966 (aged 84); Korobosea, Papua New Guinea
- Other name: Annie Clifton Smith
- Known for: founding Principal of college

Annie Mabel Sandes (3 December 1881 – 19 June 1966) was an Australian technical-college superintendent. She was the founding principal of what was later called the Emily McPherson College of Domestic Economy.

== Life ==
Sandes was born in 1881 in Cleveland. Both of her parents Annie Jane (born Goudy) and James Sandes were immigrants from Ireland. Her father was in the police and she had two elder siblings and one of them was Francis Percival Sandes who became a professor of surgery. She studied art and later cookery at Sydney Technical College where she was later employed.

Melbourne's College of Domestic Science (later called the Emily McPherson College of Domestic Economy) was founded in 1906 with Sandes as its superintendent. £1600 had been found to create it after the Australian Institute of Domestic Economy had demonstrated the need with a couple of years of talks. She was appointed in June and the college opened in October. She taught classes in the day and in the evenings and ran all aspects of the college including establishing curriculums, building maintenance and marking examinations. It was not until 1911 that the college began to train domestic science teachers although the college's students had already been selling the meals that they cooked to raise funds for the college. Sandes had her wages increased only after she resigned in protest in 1912, but she was also given additional responsibilities.

She finally left in 1916 to marry and the local paper lauded her contributions to the college. She married another teacher, Stanley Clifton Smith.

"Mrs Clifton Smith" taught at St Catherine's School in Waverley. She taught domestic science and dressmaking from 1938 until she retired in 1944 having increasing problems with her hearing.

Sandes died in Korobosea while travelling in 1966.
