= Former Melbourne Magistrates' Court =

Historical building in Melbourne

- RMIT Building 20
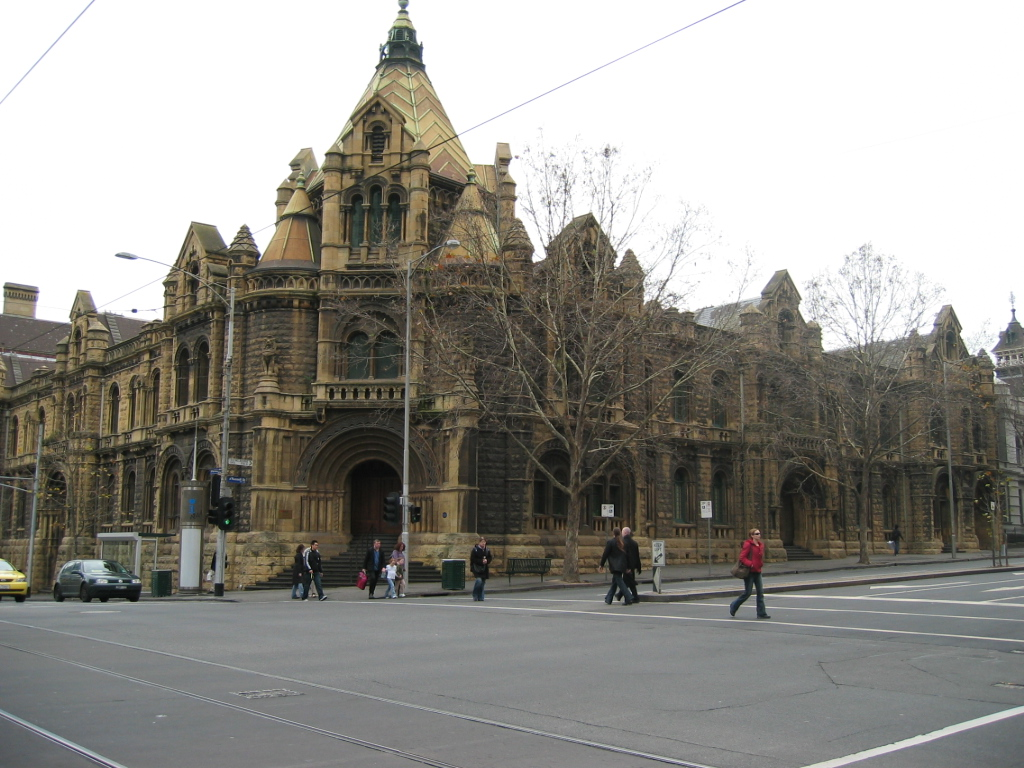
- Former Melbourne Magistrates' Court on the corner of La Trobe and Russell streets
- Interactive map of the Former Melbourne Magistrates' Court area

General information
- Type: Education, former court
- Architectural style: French Romanesque
- Location: Corner of La Trobe Street & Russell Street, Melbourne, Victoria, Australia
- Coordinates: 37.8087°S 144.9660°E
- Completed: 1914
- Owner: RMIT

Design and construction
- Architect: George B.H. Austin
- Architecture firm: Victorian Public Works Department

The Former Melbourne Magistrates' Court was the original home of Melbourne's City Court and District Court, as well as their emergency court. The French Romanesque building is located on the corner of La Trobe and Russell streets in the Melbourne central business district.

== History ==
It was opened on 20 January 1914, and served the City for 81 years, before a new Magistrates' Court building was opened on William Street in 1995.

Notable trials conducted at the court include that of Squizzy Taylor

Courthouses have occupied the site since 1843.

=== RMIT ===
The Former Melbourne Magistrates' Court became part of the neighbouring City campus of the Royal Melbourne Institute of Technology in 1997, and is officially known as RMIT Building 20 (Former Melbourne Magistrates' Court). RMIT also acquired the Former City Watch-house, located next to the Court, and together they form Building 20. The court building is used to accommodate workspace for RMIT's administration. The Watch-house building is currently used as a museum.

== Architecture ==
A notable feature of the District Court is the historic wooden canopy located over the seat upon which the Magistrate sits in the main courtroom. The canopy was taken from old Supreme Court which had originally been located at the site. At the corner of La Trobe Street and Russell Street, in the former main entrance, there are numerous holes in the bricks that were caused by shrapnel from the Russell Street Bombing that can still be seen today.

== Gallery ==
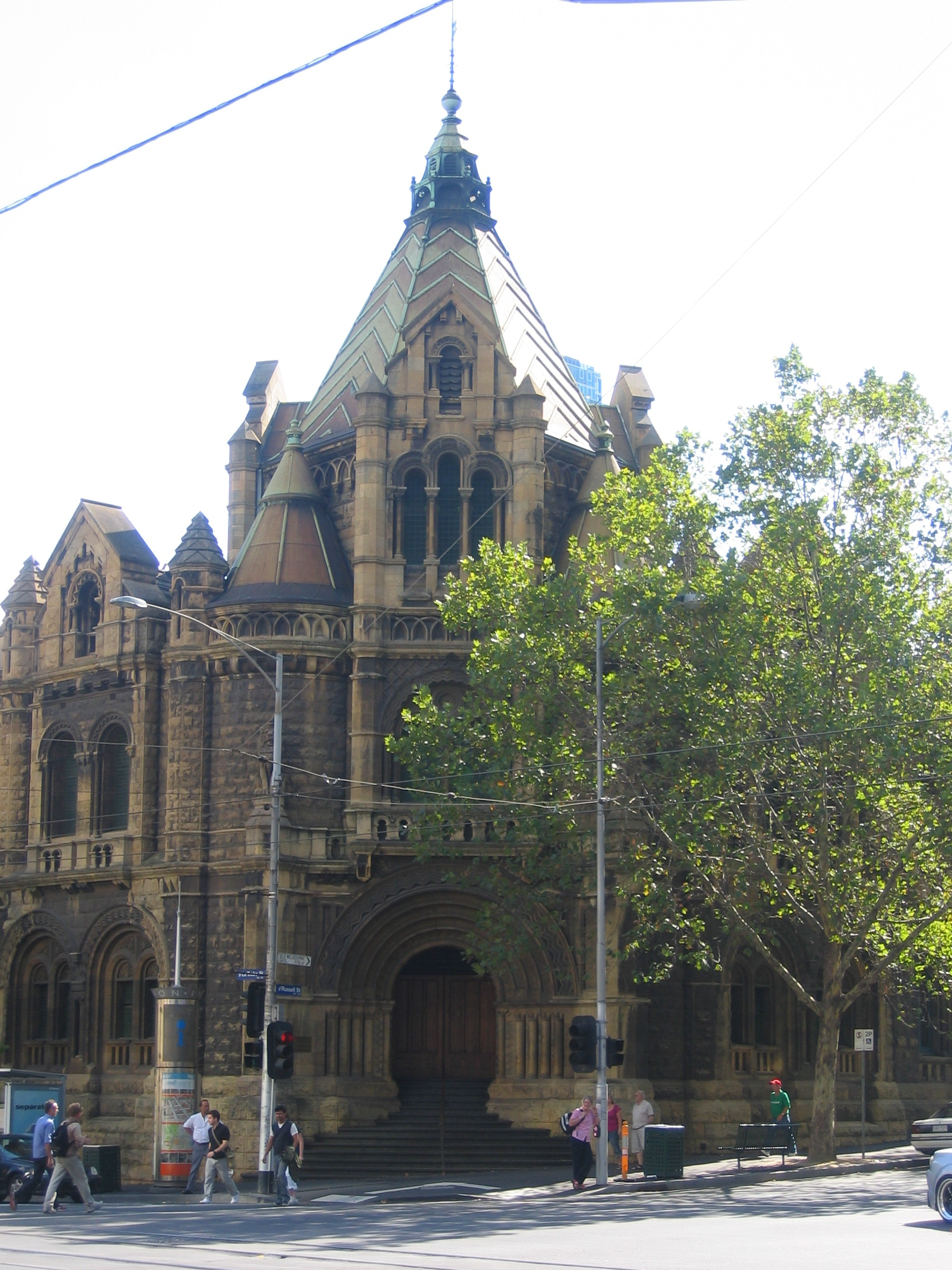

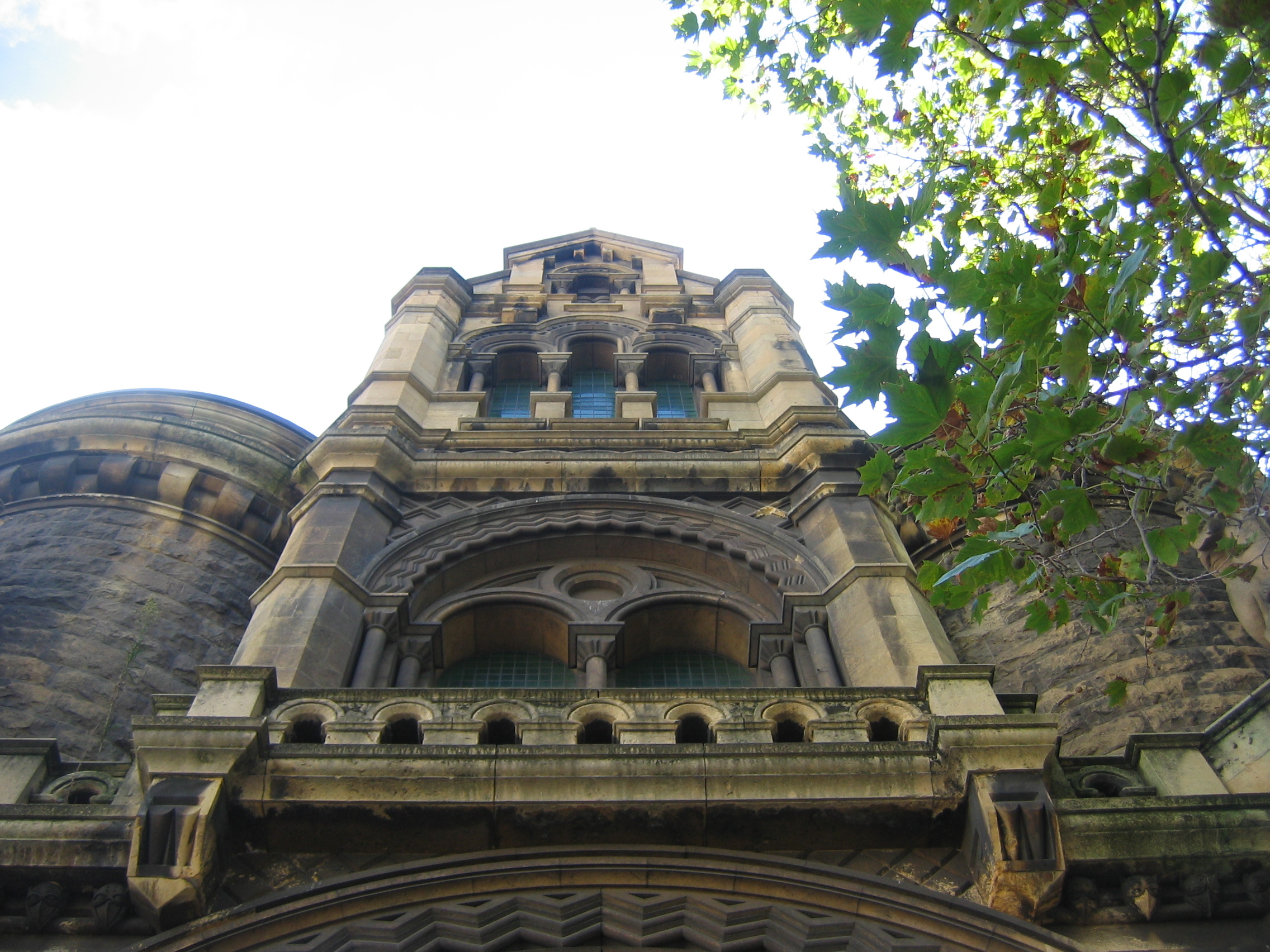

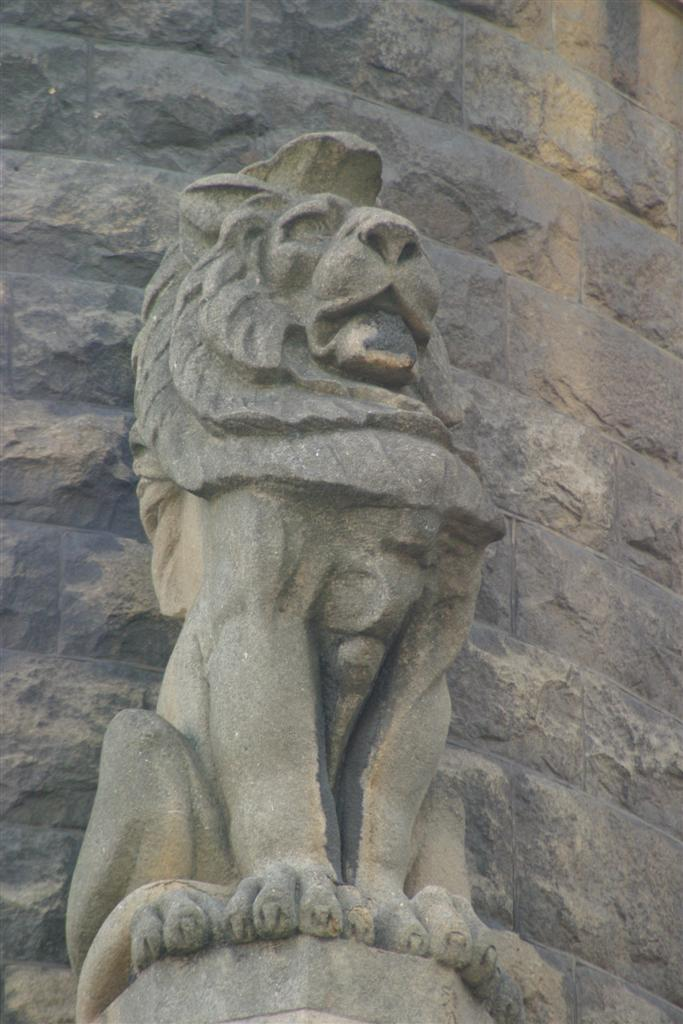

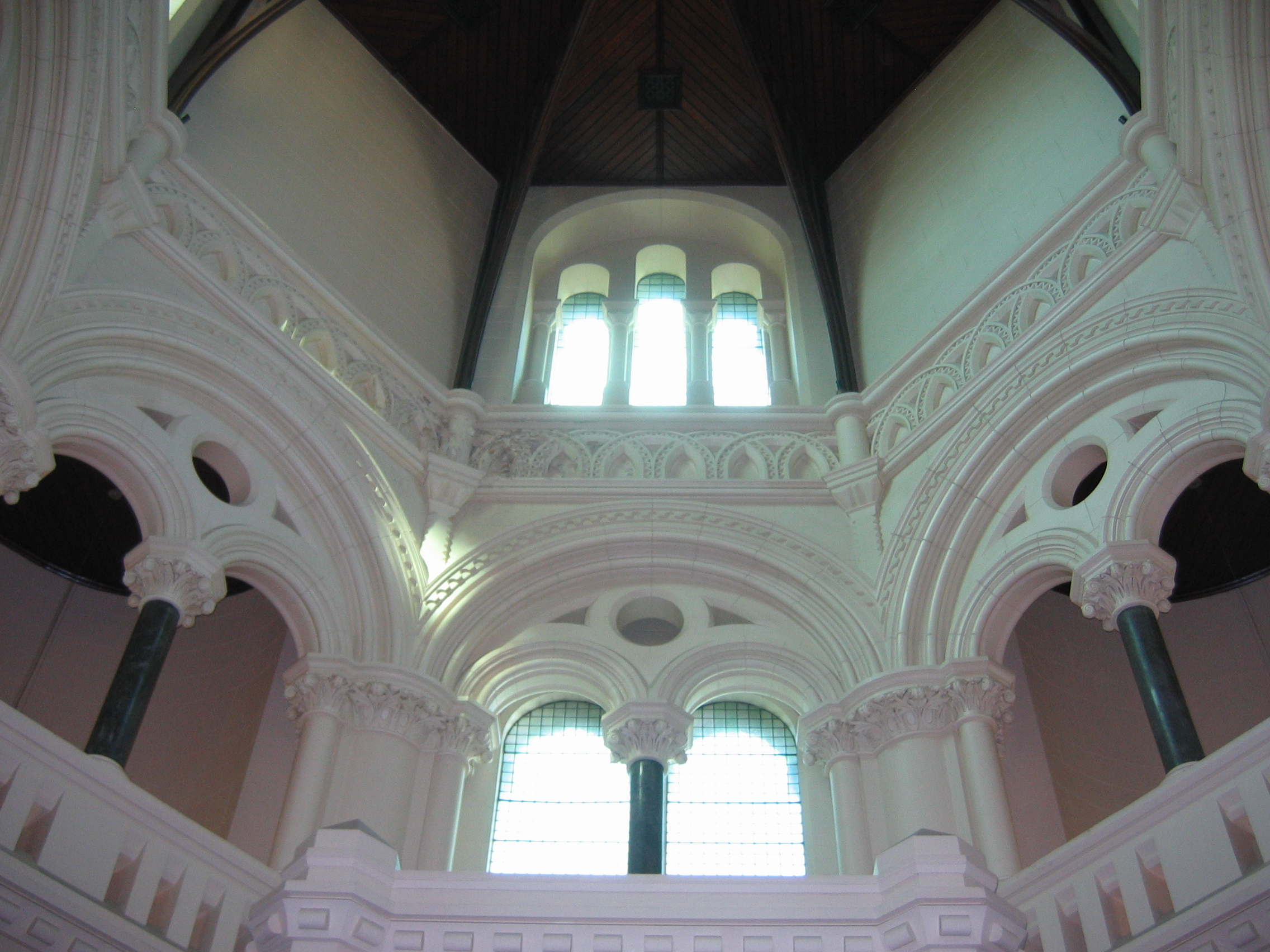

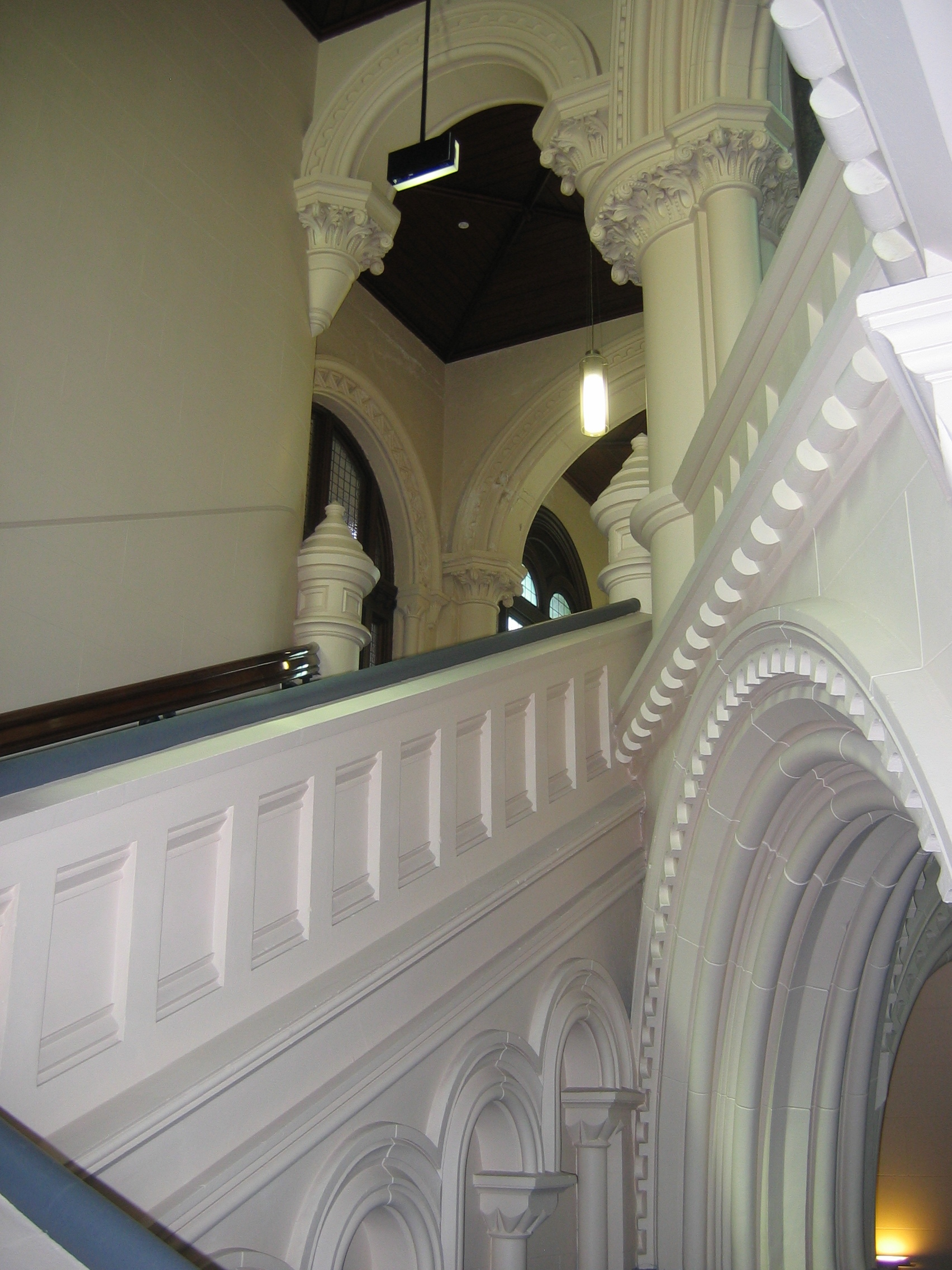

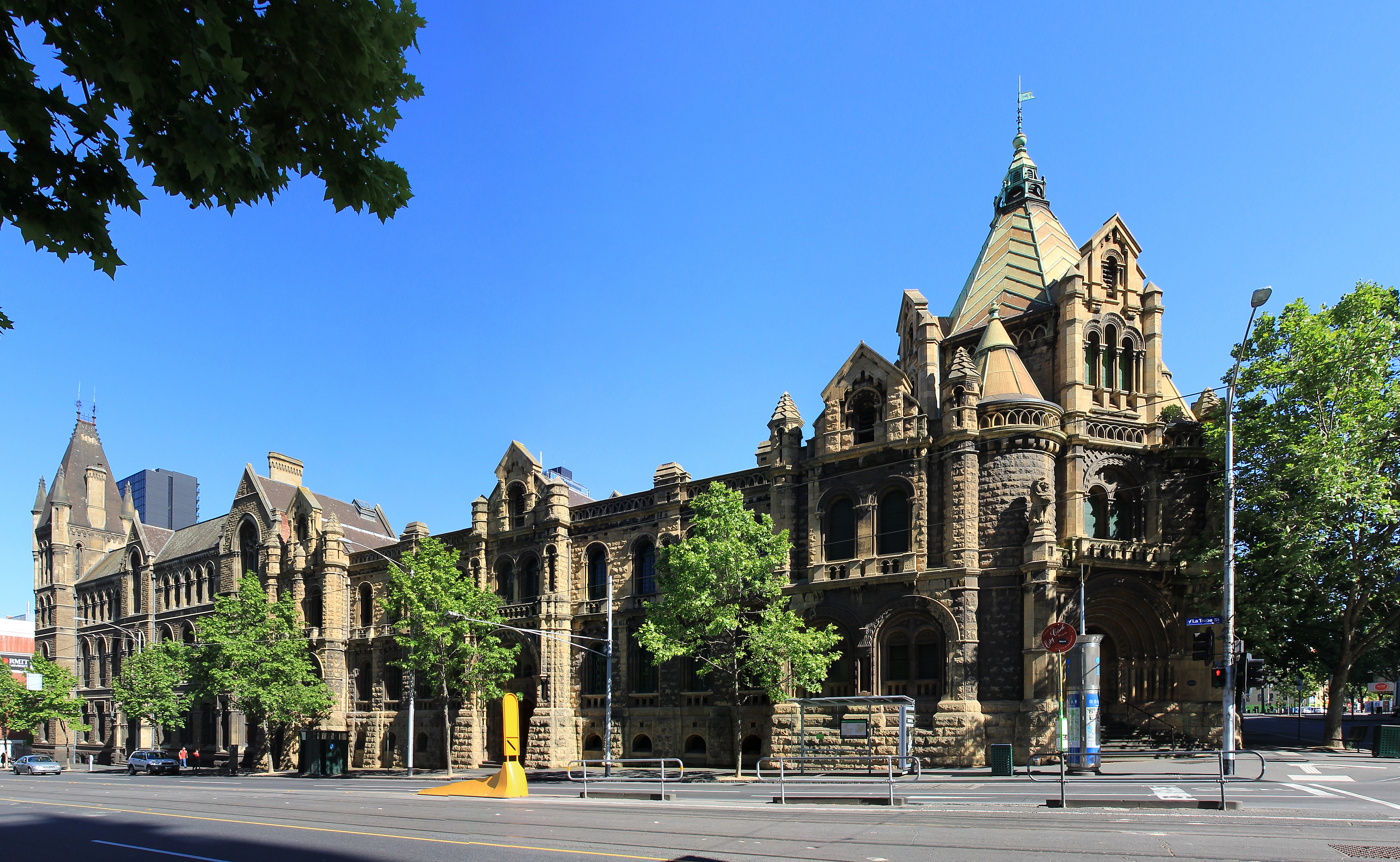

== See also ==
- Melbourne Magistrates' Court
- Magistrates' Court of Victoria
- RMIT City campus, of which the court building is now a part
