= RMIT School of Aerospace, Mechanical and Manufacturing Engineering =

School of Aerospace, Mechanical and Manufacturing Engineering
- Parent institution: College of Science, Engineering and Health, Royal Melbourne Institute of Technology
- Campus: City, Bundoora
- Website: School of Aerospace, Mechanical and Manufacturing Engineering (archived)

The RMIT School of Aerospace, Mechanical and Manufacturing Engineering (also known as SAMME) was an Australian tertiary education school within the College of Science Engineering of RMIT University.

The School consisted of three major disciplines, Aerospace and Aviation Engineering, Manufacturing and Materials Engineering and Mechanical and Automotive Engineering.

== Location ==
The Department was located in the adjoining Buildings 56 & 57 (Level 9) at the City campus and also on the Bundoora East campus.

== Industry Partners ==
Partners of the school included: Airbus, ADF, BMW, Boeing, Ford, GKN, Holden, RAeS, Subaru and Volkswagen Group.

== Sir Lawrence Wackett Aerospace Centre ==
The Sir Lawrence Wackett Aerospace Centre is a research centre created in conjunction with the School of Mathematics. It is located in Port Melbourne adjoining other Aerospace companies. The centre aims to "Create new intellectual property in partnership with industry, through research and design that addresses real world issues, for commercial use and development.". In 2004 a Memorandum of Understanding was signed between the centre and the Indian National Aerospace Laboratory. The MoU involved the centre undertaking design work for Indian aircraft. In 2007 it was successful in winning a $5 Billion tender from the Australian Department of Defence over 20 years to upgrade and replace the helicopter fleet.

== National Aerospace Resource Centre ==
The National Aerospace Resource Centre is a research collection partnership between the Royal Aeronautical Society's Australian Division and the RMIT School of Aerospace, Mechanical and Manufacturing Engineering.

It consists of approximately 100,000 volumes, including: technical reports (from NASA, NACA, AMRL and DSTO), conference proceedings, books, videos, aircraft manuals and journals, and is housed at RMIT's Bundoora West Library.
