= RMIT Graduate School of Business and Law =

Australian college graduate school

Coordinates: 37°48′28″S 144°57′48″E

Graduate School of Business and Law
- Parent institution: College of Business, Royal Melbourne Institute of Technology
- Head: Professor Mark Farrell
- Campus: City
- Website: Graduate School of Business and Law

RMIT's Graduate School of Business and Law was an Australian graduate school within the College of Business at the Royal Melbourne Institute of Technology (RMIT University), located in Melbourne, Victoria. In March 2025, the Graduate School became the College of Business and Law, comprising three schools: the School of Accounting, Information Systems and Supply Chains, the School of Economics, Finance and Marketing, and the School of Law.

== Location ==
The school was located in the heritage-listed Neoclassical building of the former Emily McPherson College of Domestic Economy (which amalgamated with RMIT in 1979). The building underwent a A$23.2 million renovation in 2010 to house the school.

The building is now the location of the RMIT School of Law.

== See also ==
- RMIT University
- Emily McPherson College of Domestic Economy
