= Russell Street, Melbourne =

Street in Melbourne, Victoria

Russell Street Victoria
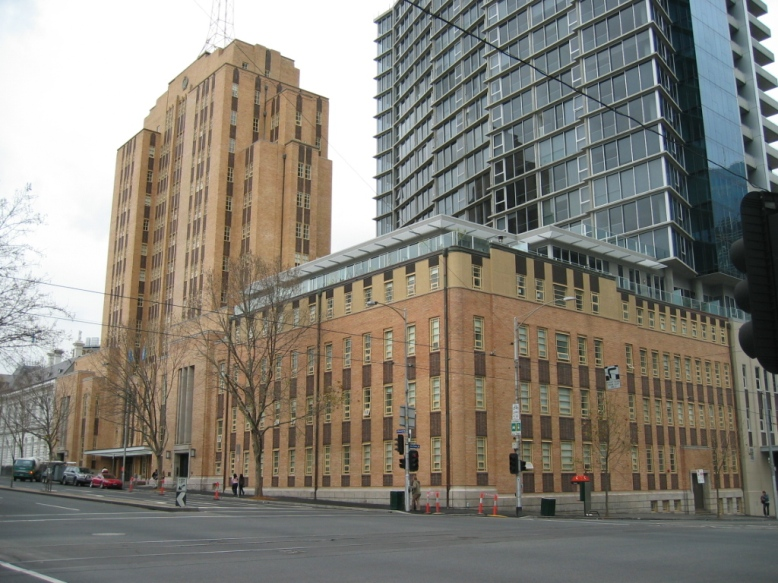
- Former Russell Street Police Headquarters
- Coordinates: 37.8119251°S 144.9676339°E

General information
- Type: Street
- Length: 1.1 km (0.7 mi)
- Opened: 1837

Major junctions
- North end: Lygon Street; Carlton, Victoria
- Victoria Street; La Trobe Street; Lonsdale Street; Bourke Street; Collins Street; Flinders Street
- South end: Brunton Avenue; Melbourne CBD

Location(s)
- LGA(s): Carlton; City of Melbourne
- Suburb(s): Carlton; Melbourne CBD

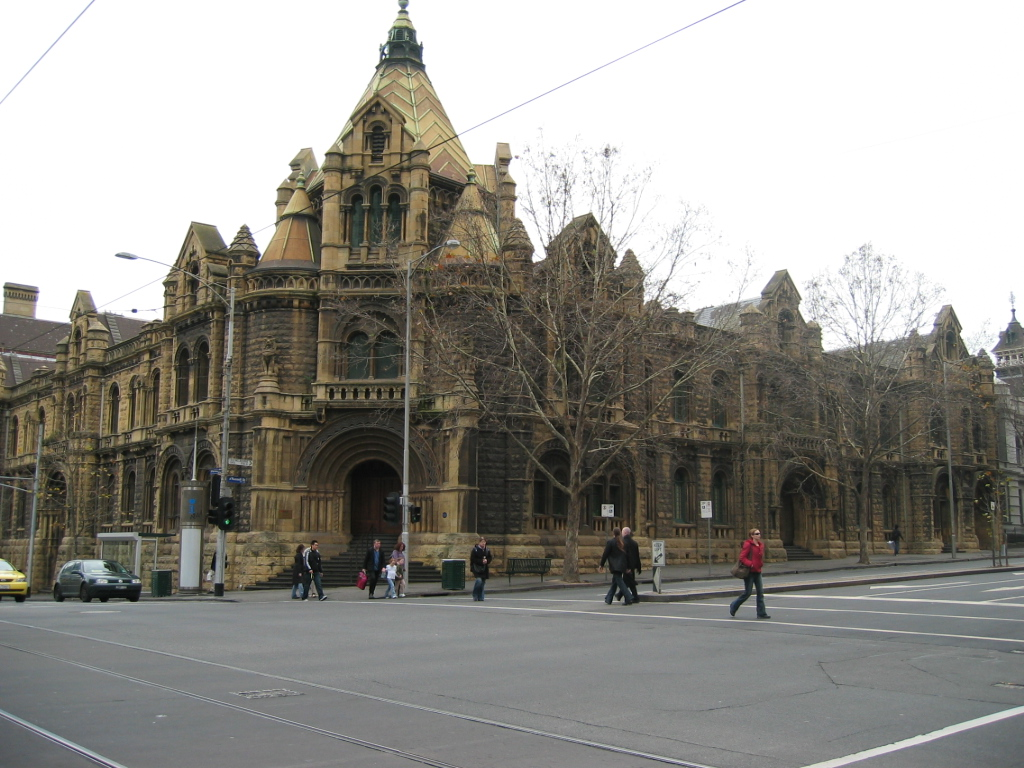
Former Melbourne Magistrate's Court on the corner of Russell and La Trobe Streets

Russell Street is a main street and thoroughfare in the Melbourne central business district, Victoria, Australia. It runs roughly north-south and was laid out as a core feature of the Hoddle Grid in 1837.

Russell Street is named after John Russell, British Home Secretary and leader of the House of Commons in Lord Melbourne's cabinet. Russell himself was also a future Prime Minister of the United Kingdom.

== Geography ==
Russell Street runs roughly north-south and is located one block east of the city's central thoroughfare of Swanston Street.

At its southern end, the street intersects with Flinders Street and Federation Square, while at its northern end it becomes Lygon Street, the main street of Melbourne's Little Italy.

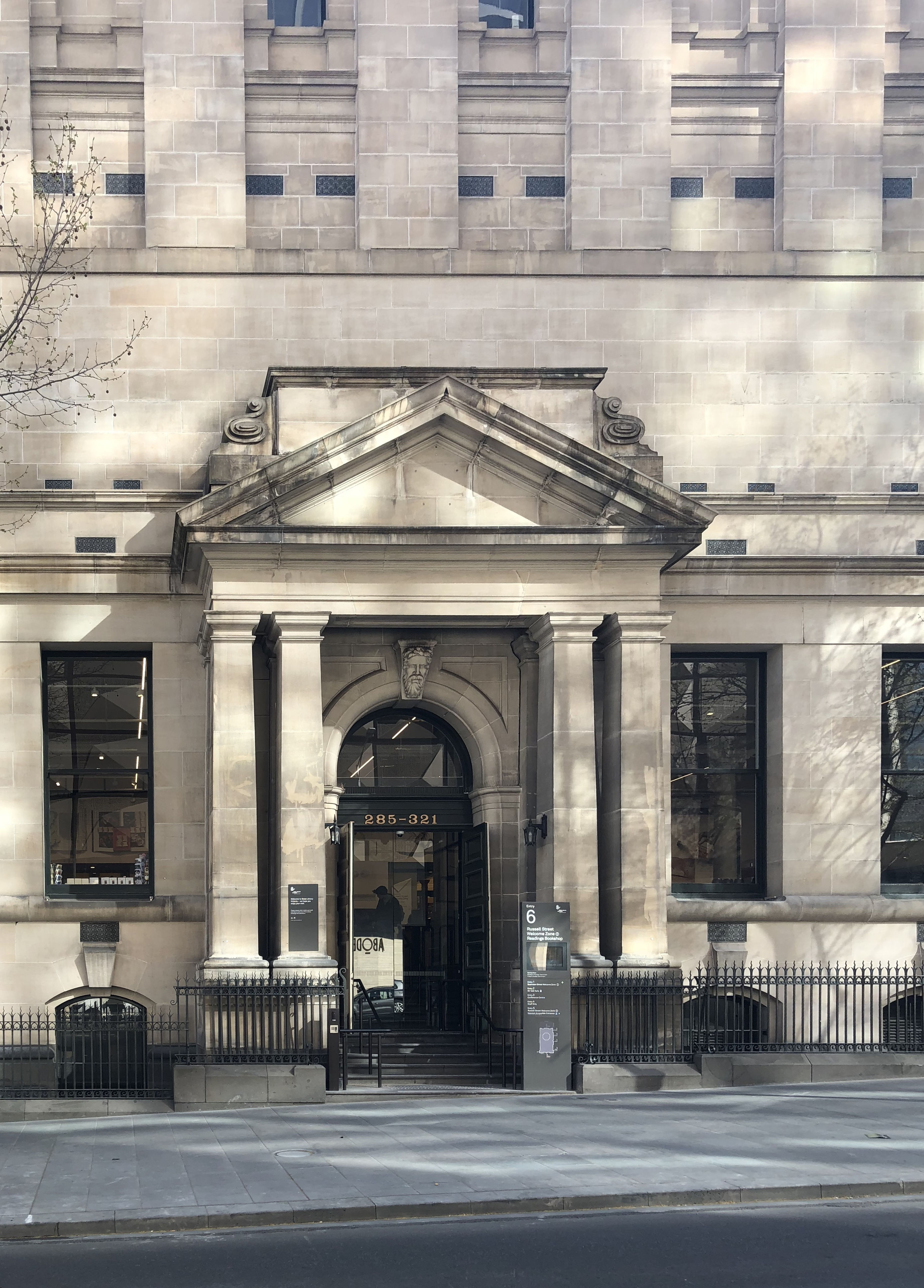
Russell Street entrance to the State Library of Victoria

== Notable buildings ==
=== Present ===
Russell Street is lined with established trees and is the home of numerous public amenities and buildings. Noteworthy structures include:

- QV Village
- RMIT University

The street is also home to many buildings featured on the Victorian Heritage Register or classified by the National Trust of Australia, including:

- Old Melbourne Gaol (1845)
- Duke of Wellington Hotel (1850)
- State Library of Victoria (1854)
- Scots' Church (1874)
- Eight Hour Day Monument, commemorating Melbourne's labour movement to adopt the 8 hour working day (1903)
- City Watch House (1909)
- Former Melbourne Magistrates' Court (1914)
- Emily McPherson College of Domestic Economy (1927)
- Former Russell Street Police Headquarters (1943)
- Former Russell Street Telephone Exchange & Post Office (1954)
- Total House (1965)
- Several Underground Public conveniences

=== Past ===
==== Savoy Theatre ====
The Savoy Theatre was a cinema located at 172 Russell Street, originally built as a temperance hall in 1872, and was quite a grand building, with marble tiled entrance. Fullers Theatres Limited leased the building, and in 1934 it was converted into a theatre, with stalls and circle levels and a stage around 17 ft (5.2 m) deep. The theatre was named the Imperial Theatre, but renamed Savoy Theatre in May 1939 by the lessees Continental Film Art Theatre of Australia who decided to focus exclusively on foreign films, mostly European post-war films with English sub-titles. The first film shown under the new name was the French film La Kermesse Baroque (The Heroic Sex). Filmmaker Fred Schepisi had his first exposure to classic post-war European films such as The Wages of Fear, Rocco and His Brothers, and Bicycle Thieves at the Savoy, when he was a teenager, sparking his interest in films.

Manager Peter Dawson, along with Frank Selleck, later ran the Sydney Savoy Theatre as well. In 1963 the Savoy Theatre was closed and demolished. A multi-storey car park, which also contained a theatre (first named Lido Theatre, later Red Garter and then Total Theatre) was built on the site.

== Russell Street bombing (1986) ==
On 27 March 1986, a car bomb was detonated on Russell Street near the Police Headquarters. Constable Angela Taylor died and 21 others were injured in what was described as a 'revenge attack' on Melbourne police, perpetrated by Stanley Taylor and Craig Minogue.

== Transport ==
Russell street is partly serviced by Kinetic Melbourne bus routes 200 and 207.

Whilst the street does not have tram lines or railway stations located on it, it is easily reached by public transport via Parliament, Flinders Street and Melbourne Central stations. It also intersects with several streets which are serviced by Melbourne tramlines, including Victoria Street, La Trobe Street, Bourke Street, Collins Street and Flinders Street.
