= Emily McPherson College of Domestic Economy =

Emily McPherson College
- RMIT Building 13
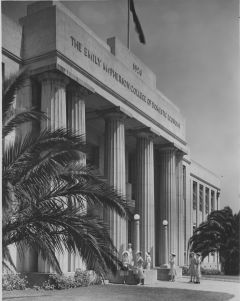
- Emily McPherson College, circa 1930
- Other name: "Emily Mac"
- Type: College of domestic science
- Active: 1906, with a new building in 1927–(amalgamated with RMIT in 1979)
- Patron: Elizabeth Bowes-Lyon
- Location: 405 Russell Street, Melbourne, Victoria, Australia; 37.8073°S 144.9653°E

The Emily McPherson College of Domestic Economy was an Australian domestic science college for women, in Melbourne, Victoria. It started in 1906 with a major donation in the 1920s.

The new building was officially opened on 27 April 1927 by The Duchess of York (later Queen Elizabeth The Queen Mother.) On 30 June 1979 it became part of the Royal Melbourne Institute of Technology and is known as RMIT Building 13 (Emily McPherson College).

== History of the college ==
The College of Domestic Science was founded in 1906 with a young teacher, Annie Mabel Sandes, as its superintendent. She was appointed in June and the college opened in October. She taught classes in the day and in the evenings and ran all aspects from establishing curriculums, building maintenance and marking examinations. It was not until 1911 that the college began to train domestic science teachers although the college's students had already been selling the meals that they cooked to raise funds for the college. Sandes had her wages increased only after she resigned in protest, but she was also given additional responsibilities. When she left in 1916 to marry, the local paper lauded her contributions.

During the 1920s, Melbourne businessman Sir William McPherson donated £25,000 (≈ A$2.3 million in 2023) towards a college of domestic science exclusively for women; which was named in honour of his wife Lady Emily McPherson. Sir William McPherson was a former Treasurer of Victoria and he was later Premier.

The building opened in 1927, and was designed by then state architect Evan Smith, in simplified Neo-Grec architecture and Beaux-Arts style. In 1941 Ruby Gainfort was made the acting principal and she was noted for championing the skills that the college was creating while also supporting both students and teachers during wartime. She stayed until 1946.

The Ethel Osborne Wing opened in 1950, and was designed by then state architect Percy Everett. The building was awarded the second ever Victorian Architecture Medal in 1930 known at the time as the RVIA Street Architecture Medal.

=== Opening ===
The college, on the corner of Russell Street and Victoria Street adjacent to the Royal Melbourne Institute of Technology, was officially opened on 27 April 1927 by the Duchess of York (later Queen Elizabeth The Queen Mother), during a royal visit to Australia by her and her husband, the Duke of York (later George VI.)

The Age newspaper later estimated that a crowd of 5,000 people and dignitaries gathered outside the new college, with a guard of honour formed by students from schools as far afield as Ballarat and Bendigo, to witness the Duchess officially open the college with a gold key and unveil a commemorative plaque and bust of Lady McPherson:

Dr Ethel Osborne, who had invited the Duchess to open the college, then presented her with the first diploma issued by the college stating that the Duchess "had set all Australians an example of home life". Upon accepting the diploma, the Duchess thanked Dr Osborne and said "it will always be a delightful memento but one of which I am afraid I am not worthy!".

== Present college building ==
On 30 June 1979, the college was amalgamated with the nearby expanding Royal Melbourne Institute of Technology (RMIT). Today, it remains a part of the RMIT City campus, and has been refurbished to house the RMIT Graduate School of Business.

The building is registered as "significant" and a "notable building" with the Victorian Heritage Register and the National Trust of Australia.
