= List of RMIT University people =

This is a list of RMIT University people.

This list of people includes alumni as well as current and former students and faculty of the Australian (RMIT University) and Vietnamese (RMIT University Vietnam) branches of the Royal Melbourne Institute of Technology (RMIT).

It also includes alumni as well as former students and faculty from its antecedents: Melbourne Technical College (MTC) and Working Men's College (WMC); amalgamations with: Emily McPherson College of Domestic Economy (EMC), Melbourne College of Decoration, Melbourne College of Printing and Graphic Art and Melbourne College of Textiles; and merger with Phillip Institute of Technology (PIT).

== Art ==
=== Drawing and painting ===
Name	Association with RMIT	Notability	References
Maryam Al Zadjali	MA Arts Administration	painter and Director of the Omani Society of Fine Arts	
Ian Armstrong	Dip Art	painter	
Irene Barberis	former Head of Drawing	founder and Director of Metasenta and the DrawingSpace, Melbourne, both of which have been based at RMIT	
Charles Billich	art classes	painter; work held in the UN Headquarters, Vatican Museums and White House collections	
Godwin Bradbeer	former Head of Drawing	artist	
Bill Coleman	art classes [MTC]	artist	
David de Vries	painting classes	comic book artist and writer, previously with DC Comics and Mad Magazine	
Lindsay Edward	attended, faculty	abstract artist, developed the Lindsay Edwards Fine Art Collection at RMIT	
Vincent Fantauzzo	BFA, MFA, faculty	portrait artist, four time winner of the Archibald People's Choice Award	
Harold Freedman, OAM	art classes, former faculty	mural artist, former State Artist of Victoria	
Luis Geraldes	former faculty	artist	
Virginia Grayson	BFA (Hon), MFA, faculty	artist; recipient of the Dobell Prize (2008)	
William Ellis Green	art classes	newspaper cartoonist; best known by the pen name "WEG"	
Robin Hill	art classes	painter and naturalist	
Robert Hollingworth	MA (Fine Art), former faculty	artist; recipient of the Sir John Sulman Prize (1990)	
Robert Ingpen	Dip Art (Graphics), D Arts (honoris causa)	illustrator and writer; designed the flag of the Northern Territory and many Australian postage stamps	
Kenneth Jack	art classes	painter; work held in the National Gallery of Australia and Windsor Castle Royal Collection	
Robert Jacks	BA (Painting)	artist; recipient of the Sir John Sulman Prize (1998) and Bendigo Art Gallery's Robert Jacks Prize named in his honour	
Jennifer Joseph	fine art classes	artist	
Anne Judell	BA	artist; recipient of the Dobell Prize (2011)	
Barry Kay	art classes, painting	painter, scenery and costume design for the theatre, photographer	
John Kelly	BA (Painting), MA (Painting)	painter; painted the "Dobell's Cows" series	
Roger Kemp	commercial art classes [WMC]	abstract artist	
Ligel Lambert	(Painting), MFA	painter	
Sam Leach	BA (Hon) (Painting), MFA	painter; third artist ever to receive the Archibald and Wynne prizes in the same year (2010)	
Richard Linton	photolithography classes	painter	
Tony Lloyd	MFA	painter	
Van Thanh Rudd	BA (Hon) (Painting)	controversial artist; nephew of former Prime Minister Kevin Rudd	
Gareth Sansom	art classes	artist; former dean of the School of Art at the Victorian College of the Arts and recipient of the Dobell Prize (2012)	
Napier Waller	former faculty [WMC]	mural artist	
Charles Wheeler	art classes	painter and recipient of the Archibald Prize (1933)	

=== Photography and printmaking ===
Name	Association with RMIT	Notability	References
Tate Adams	former faculty	printmaker	
Peter Bennetts	BA (Photo)	photographer	
Samantha Everton	BA	photographer	
Murray Griffin	former faculty	printmaker	
Grahame King	art classes	printmaker	
Charles Page	Dip Photo, BA (Photo)	photographer	
Graham Pizzey	DAppSci (honoris causa), faculty	photographer and writer	
Udo Sellbach	former faculty	printmaker; co-founder of the Print Council of Australia	
Heather Shimmen	BA	printmaker	
Christopher Stewart	former faculty	photographer; current Professor of Photography at the University of Technology, Sydney	
Harrison Tsui	attended	fashion photographer	

=== Sculpture and smithing ===
Name	Association with RMIT	Notability	References
Kingsley Baird	MFA	sculptor	
Peter Corlett	attended	sculptor	
Stuart Devlin	Dip Art (Smithing), D Arts (honoris causa)	goldsmith; designed the decimal coinage of Australia; former official jeweller to Queen Elizabeth II	
Ray Ewers	art classes	sculptor; work held by the Australian War Memorial	
Leonard French	art classes	artist; designed the stained glass ceiling of the National Gallery of Victoria	
Pamela Irving	former faculty	sculptor; created the popular "Larry La Trobe" sculpture in City Square, Melbourne	
Stacha Halpern	attended	sculptor	
Inge King	D Arts (honoris causa), faculty	sculptor	
Clement Meadmore	BEng, D Arts (honoris causa)	sculptor	
Lenton Parr	Sculpture classes, D Arts (honoris causa)	former director of the Victorian College of the Arts; Lenton Parr Library at the VCA named in his honour	
Klytie Pate	art classes [MTC]	potter; work held by the National Gallery of Victoria and the National Gallery of Australia	
Simon Perry	faculty	sculptor; created the popular "Public Purse" sculpture in Bourke Street, Melbourne	
Lisa Roet	BFA	sculptor	
Zoja Trofimiuk	MFA	sculptor	
Victor Vodicka	faculty, Fellowship Dip Art/Ind. Design	gold and silversmith	
Teisutis Zikaras	former faculty	sculptor	

=== Others ===
Name	Association with RMIT	Notability	References
Stephen Banham	BA, faculty	typographer	
Betty Churcher	former faculty	former director of the National Gallery of Australia (1990–1997)	
Alison Forbes	attended	book designer; inducted into the Australian Book Designers' Association Hall of Fame (2018)	
Sir Jonathan Mills	MArch, DArts (honoris causa)	festival director; current director of the Edinburgh International Festival and former director of the Melbourne Festival	
Jill Orr	MFA	visual artist	
Sarah Jane Pell	Dip Eng, former faculty	performance and visual artist; former researcher in RMIT's Exertion Games Lab	
Ron Radford	Dip Art (Painting), D Arts (honoris causa)	former Director of the National Gallery of Australia (2004–2014)	
Tejal Shah	BA	multidisciplinary visual artist	
Christian Thompson	BA (Hon) (Visual Art), MFA	visual artist	
Timothy James Webb	MFA	visual artist	
Shaun Wilson	BFA, faculty	visual artist	
Ilka White	Dip (Studio Textiles)	textile artist	

== Business and society ==
Name	Association with RMIT	Notability	References
Peter Beilharz	former faculty	sociologist; co-founder and editor of the academic journal Thesis Eleven	
Henry Bosch	faculty	businessman; adjunct professor in the RMIT School of Management	
Allan Briggs	faculty	crisis communications expert and founder of Briggs Communications	
Marjorie Buckingham	senior lecturer for 32 years	novelist and children's writer	
Andrew Darbyshire	attended	software entrepreneur and philanthropist, founder of Pacsoft	
Andrew Demetriou	former faculty	former CEO of the Australian Football League (AFL)	
Philip Down	DipAppSci	Church of England Archdeacon of Ashford	
David Dunstan	former faculty	Australian history academic; former Director of Monash University's National Centre for Australian Studies	
Bob Isherwood	Dip Art (Advert), D Comm (honoris causa)	business leader; former worldwide creative director of Saatchi & Saatchi	
Margaret Gardner	former Vice-Chancellor	economist and community leader, current Vice-Chancellor of Monash University (2014–present)	
Paul James	former faculty	Director of the UN Global Cities Programme and former director of the RMIT Global Cities Research Institute	
Mary Kalantzis	faculty	Adjunct Professor in the RMIT School of Global Studies, Social Science and Planning	
Bruce Kingsbury	attended	World War II soldier and recipient of the Victoria Cross	
Tan Le	faculty	business leader and president of Emotiv Systems	
Jonathan Ling	MBA	CEO and managing director of New Zealand's largest listed company Fletcher Building	
Paul Little	attended, D Bus (honoris causa)	Director of Little Projects and former Director of Australasia's largest transport company Toll Holdings	
Francis Macnab	D Psych (honoris causa)	Executive Minister of the Uniting Church of St Michael's in Melbourne and founder of the Cairnmillar Institute	
Harold Mitchell	Dip Advert, DBus (honoris causa)	media entrepreneur and philanthropist, founder of Mitchell Communications	
Tom Nairn	former faculty	nationalist, RMIT's Globalism Research Centre Tom Nairn Lecture named in his honour	
Jacques Nasser	BBus, D Tech (honoris causa)	Chairman of the World's largest mining company BHP Billiton, and former CEO of Ford	
Tony Naughton	former faculty	former professor of economics and head of the RMIT School of Economics, Finance and Marketing	
Francis Ormond	founder	grazier, politician and public benefactor; Building 1 (Francis Ormond Building) at RMIT named in his honour	
Charles Pearson	former faculty	journalist and politician; Pearson & Murphy's café at RMIT named after him	
Melinda Tankard Reist	BA (Journ)	advocate for women's rights and media commentator	
Bruce Ruxton	attended	former president of the Returned and Services League of Australia (Victorian Branch)	
Leonie Sandercock	former Deputy Dean	former deputy dean of the RMIT School of Global Studies, Social Science and Planning	
Dame Margaret Scott	Dip Ed, Grad Dip Arts, D Ed (honoris causa)	ballet dancer; founder and former director of the Australian Ballet School	
Paul Stoddart	attended	former owner of the Minardi (Formula 1) and Minardi Team USA (Indy Car) racing teams	
Ziggy Switkowski	current chancellor	business leader and nuclear scientist	
Robert Thomson	BA (Journ)	CEO of News Corp, former editor-at-large of The Wall Street Journal as well as The Times	

== Design ==
=== Architecture ===
Name	Association with RMIT	Notability	References
Hillson Beasley	faculty	architect	
Robin Boyd	Architecture classes	influential architect and proponent of modern architecture in Australia	
Mark Burry	faculty	Director of RMIT's Design Research Institute and Spatial Information Architecture Laboratory	
Neil Clerehan	Attended	architect	
Peter Corrigan	D Arch (honoris causa), faculty	architect; Principal of Edmond and Corrigan	
Norman Day	MArch, D Arch (honoris causa), faculty	architect and writer; adjunct professor of architecture at RMIT	
Harold Desbrowe-Annear	former faculty [WMC]	architect	
Harriet Edquist	professor of architectural history	architectural historian	
Zahava Elenberg	BArch (Hon)	architect; Young Australian Businesswoman of the Year (2003)	
Cassandra Fahey	BArch	architect; designed the controversial "Sam Newman House" in St Kilda	
Ernest Fooks	former faculty [MTC]	architect; first lecturer in town planning at Melbourne Technical College (antecedent to RMIT)	
Eli Giannini	BArch, MArch	architect, director of MGS Architects and Life Fellow of the Australian Institute of Architects	
Sean Godsell	MArch	sustainable-design architect	
Elizabeth Grant	Faculty	Assoc Professor of Architecture & Urban Design RMIT; Adjunct Professor of Architecture and Design at the University of Canberra, Adjunct Associate Professor of Architecture University of Queensland	
Graeme Gunn	Dip, D Arch (honoris causa), former faculty	architect; foundation dean of the RMIT School of Architecture and Design	
Daryl Jackson	Dip Arch	architect; designed Etihad Stadium and the MCG's Great Southern Stand	
Nonda Katsalidis	MArch	architect; Principal of Fender Katsalidis Architects; designed Eureka Tower	
William S.W. Lim	D Arch (honoris causa), faculty	architect; Adjunct Professor of Architecture at RMIT	
Peter Maddison	BArch 1983, D Design (honoris causa) 2014	architect, host Grand Designs Australia 2009-23	
Peter McIntyre	Dip Arch	architect; Emeritus professor of Architecture at the University of Melbourne	
Paul Mees	former faculty	urban planner	
Geoffrey Harley Mewton	former faculty [WMC]	architect and proponent of modern architecture in Australia	
Barry Patten	Dip Arch	architect; designed the Sidney Myer Music Bowl	
Arpan Shah	Dip Arch	Indian Architect	
Howard Raggatt	MArch, faculty	architect; Principal of Ashton Raggatt McDougall; Adjunct Professor of Architecture at RMIT	
Ivan Rijavec	BArch, MArch, faculty	architect and creative director	
Louis Sauer	Faculty	architect; former head of the department of architecture at Carnegie-Mellon University	
Kerstin Thompson	BArch(Hon), faculty	architect	
John Wardle	BArch, MArch	architect; Adjunct Professor of Architecture and Design at the University of South Australia	
James Weirick	Former Head of Landscape Architecture	architect	

=== Fashion industry ===
Name	Association with RMIT	Notability	References
Prue Acton	Dip Textile Design, D Arts (honoris causa)	fashion designer and businesswoman	
Peter Alexander	faculty	fashion designer	
Jenny Bannister	Dip Fashion [EMC]	fashion designer	
Graham Bennett	art classes	costume designer, teacher and collaborator with Academy Award-winner John Truscott	
Linda Britten	Dip Fashion [EMC]	fashion designer	
Linda Jackson	Dip Fashion Design [EMC]	fashion designer	
Toni Matičevski	BA (Fashion) (Hon)	fashion designer; former designer with Nino Cerruti and Donna Karan	
Sruli Recht	BA (Fashion)	fashion designer; infamous for using Arctic Fox fur, seal pelt and whale skin in his designs	
Laksmi Shari De-Neefe Suardana	B.Des in Fashion Design	Indonesian fashion designer, co-founder Ubud Writers & Readers Festival, G20 Ambassador, UNICEF activist, book author, fashion model, Winner of Puteri Indonesia 2022, Miss Universe Indonesia 2022	

== Entertainment and media ==
Note: RMITV is a department of the RMIT University Student Union, which offers training accredited by RMIT.

=== Film and television ===
Name	Association with RMIT	Notability	References
Faustina Agolley	BComm (Media)	television presenter known by the nickname "Fuzzy"; co-host of The Voice and former host of Video Hits	
Hamish Blake	RMITV production classes	member of the comedy double act Hamish & Andy	
Damian Callinan	Grad Dip Arts	comedian and media personality	
Mohammed El-leissy	BAppSci	comedian and media personality	
Tim Ferguson	faculty	comedian and author; former member of the comedy troupe the Doug Anthony All Stars	
Travis Fimmel	attended	model and actor; former model for Calvin Klein and currently starring the television series Vikings	
Greig Fraser	Photography	Academy Award nominated director of photography	
Corinne Grant	RMITV production classes	comedian and media personality	
Cliff Green	Dip Writing	Emmy and Saturn award-nominated screenwriter	
Paul Harris	faculty	film critic and director of the St Kilda Short Film Festival (1999–present)	
Peter Helliar	RMITV production classes	comedian and media personality	
Tony Le-Nguyen	Dip TV Production	actor and filmmaker	
Andy Lee	RMITV production classes	member of the comedy double act Hamish & Andy	
Eddie Maguire	BComm (Journ), DComm (honoris causa)	media personality and journalist; former CEO of the Nine Network	
Adrian Martin	former faculty	film critic	
Rove McManus	RMITV production classes	media personality, producer and three-time Gold Logie Award-winning host of the television show Rove Live	
Tony McNamara	Writing	Screenwriter, writer of The Favourite and The Great	
Mai Phương Thúy	BBus	model and actor; 2006 Miss Vietnam	
John Safran	BA	AFI Award-winning documentary filmmaker	
Ryan Shelton	RMITV production classes	comedian and media personality; radio host on Nova 100	
Megan Spencer	BA (Media Arts)	documentary filmmaker	
Clare Stewart	BComm (Media), former faculty	Head of Exhibition for BFI, former director of the Sydney Film Festival and former Head of Film for AFI and ACMI	
Deb Verhoeven	former faculty	film critic and academic; Deputy Chair of the National Film and Sound Archive	
James Wan	BA (Multimedia)	filmmaker; created and directed the Saw films	
Leigh Whannell	BA (Multimedia)	filmmaker; created and acted in the Saw films	
Elaine Yiu	Comm Foundations, BSci	actress and television presenter	
Quan Zhou	BComm (Media)	filmmaker; End of Summer won KNN Award at Busan International Film Festival	

=== Journalism ===
Name	Association with RMIT	Notability	References
David Astle	faculty	writer; known for his crosswords in The Age and Sydney Morning Herald and television show Letters and Numbers	
Bunty Avieson	Assoc Dip Journ	journalist and author	
Les Carlyon	faculty	dual Walkley Award-winning journalist and author	
Julian de Stoop	BA (Journ)	sports journalist, currently the Melbourne bureau chief of Fox Sports News on Fox Sports	
John Garrett	BA (Photo)	photojournalist	
Alicia Gorey	BA (Journ)	journalist; presenter of the Melbourne weekend edition of Nine News on the Nine Network	
Anthony Hudson	BA (Journ)	sports journalist; chief Australian rules football reporter on the Ten Network	
Andrew Jaspan	faculty	journalist; co-founder and editor of The Conversation and former editor of The Age, The Observer and The Scotsman	
Nick Johnston	BA (Journ)	journalist; former senior reporter for the national weekday edition of Nine News on the Nine Network	
Rebecca Maddern	BA (Media)	news presenter; host of the Melbourne weekday edition of Seven News on the Seven Network	
Edwin Maher	former faculty	journalist; first non-Chinese presenter with China's international news service CCTV News	
Chris Masters	D Comm (honoris causa), faculty	Walkley Award and Logie award-winning journalist; adjunct professor of communication at RMIT	
Nick McKenzie	BA (Journalism) 2001	journalist, Melbourne's The Age, The Sydney Morning Herald and The Australian Financial Review, previously reported for Australian Broadcasting Corporation's Four Corners and Nine’s 60 Minutes; Walkley Awards, Graham Perkin Australian Journalist of the Year, Kennedy Award for Journalist of the Year	
Brett McLeod	BA (Media)	journalist; reporter on the Melbourne edition of Nine News on the Nine Network	
Amy Parks	BA (Journ)	journalist; reporter on the Melbourne edition of Seven News on the Seven Network and formally with the Nine Network	
Muriel Porter	former faculty	journalist and theological writer	
Jill Singer	faculty	Walkley Award-winning journalist; former senior reporter for The 7:30 Report on ABC	

=== Literature ===
Name	Association with RMIT	Notability	References
Kalinda Ashton	Dip Writing, PhD, faculty	writer	
Carmel Bird	former faculty	writer	
Steven Carroll	former faculty	writer and critic; recipient of the Miles Franklin Award (2008)	
Anuja Chauhan	Grad Dip Writing	writer and advertising executive; known for The Zoya Factor	
Alison Goodman	MA (Writing)	author	
Brendan Gullifer	MA (Writing)	author and former journalist	
Rosalie Ham	AdvDipArts (Prof. Writing & Editing), MA (Creative Writing)	author, best known for The Dressmaker	
Sonya Hartnett	BA (Media)	author; recipient of the Astrid Lindgren Memorial Award (2008)	
M. J. Hyland	Dip Writing & Editing	author; known for Carry Me Down	
Antoni Jach	faculty	author	
Martine Murray	MA (Writing)	author	
Peter Temple	former faculty	crime fiction author; recipient of the Miles Franklin Award (2010)	
Carrie Tiffany	Dip Writing & Editing, MA (Writing)	author	
Walter J. Turner	attended [WMC]	poet and critic	
Alexis Wright	Dip Writing, D Arts (honoris causa)	indigenous author; recipient of the Miles Franklin Award (2006)	
Ania Walwicz	faculty	poet	
Chris Womersley	Dip Writing & Editing	author	

=== Music industry ===
Name	Association with RMIT	Notability	References
Robyn Archer	faculty	ARIA Award-winning singer and art director; Advisor with RMIT's Globalism Research Centre	
Philip Brophy	faculty	experimental musician and academic	
Davide Carbone	former faculty	ARIA Award-winning composer and producer; founder of the School of Synthesis	
Paul Doornbusch	former faculty	music academic	
Judith Durham	writing classes	lead singer with the ARIA Award-winning and Academy Award-nominated band The Seekers	
Nicole Foote	BComm (Media)	DJ and radio presenter; current host of Mix Up (radio show) on Triple J	
David Haberfeld	BFA (Media Arts), MA	ARIA Award-nominated DJ and music producer; performs as "Honeysmack"	
Plutonic Lab	BA (Hon)	ARIA Award-nominated DJ and music producer; member of Muph & Plutonic and drummer with Hilltop Hoods	
Finn Robertson	BA (Media Arts)	composer	
Andrew Stockdale	BA	lead singer and guitarist with the Grammy Award-winning band Wolfmother	
Darrin Verhagen	faculty	composer	
Jonathan Welch	faculty	conductor and opera singer, founded The Choir of Hard Knocks	
Chun Wu	BBus (Admin)	actor and singer; member of the Taiwanese boyband Fahrenheit	

== Government and law ==
=== Leaders ===
Name	Association with RMIT	Notability	References
Austin Asche	former President	3rd Chief Justice and 13th Administrator of the Northern Territory	
Ted Baillieu	Dip Bus	46th Premier of Victoria	
Richard Casey	FRMIT	16th Governor-General of Australia; Casey Building and Plaza at RMIT named in his honour	
Neil Comrie	Assoc Dip Criminal Justice	former Chief Commissioner of Victoria Police	
Bernard Evans	architecture classes [WMC], former President [MTC]	75th Lord Mayor of Melbourne, army officer and architect	
Steve Fielding	BEng	current Leader of the Family First Party	
Samuel Gillott	former President [WMC]	47th Lord Mayor of Melbourne	
Rob Hulls	justice studies, Juris Doctor	former Attorney-General and Deputy Premier of Victoria	
Pat McNamara	business studies	former Leader of the National Party (Victorian Branch) and Deputy Premier of Victoria	
William McPherson	founder [EMC]	31st Premier of Victoria, donated the majority of foundation funds to the Emily McPherson College (now a part of RMIT)	
Oliver Nilsen	attended [WMC]	70th Lord Mayor of Melbourne	
Peter Ryan	justice studies	former Leader of the National Party (Victorian Branch) and former Deputy Premier of Victoria	
John Sanderson	Dip Civ Eng	former Chief of the Australian Army and 31st Governor of Western Australia	
Marcus Stephen	Dip Accounting	11th President of Nauru; weightlifter and Olympic and Commonwealth Games gold medallist	
William Watt	accounting and grammar classes [WMC]	24th Premier of Victoria and campaigner for the Australian federation cause	

=== Ministers ===
Name	Association with RMIT	Notability	References
Frank Anstey	attended	former Minister for Health in the Parliament of Australia	
Bruce Billson	BBus, Grad Dip Management, MBus (Lead)	former Minister for Small Business in the Parliament of Australia	
Don Cameron	President [MTC]	former Minister for Aircraft Production during World War II and Post-Master General of Australia	
Bruce Chamberlain	former faculty	former president of the Legislative Council in the Parliament of Victoria	
Richard Dalla-Riva	Assoc Dip Bus [PIT]	former Minister for Employment and Industrial Relations in the Parliament of Victoria	
David Davis	BAppSci [PIT]	former Minister for Health and Ageing in the Parliament of Victoria	
Raymond Garrett	science and engineering classes	former President of the Legislative Council in the Parliament of Victoria	
Lim Boon Heng	D Bus (honoris causa), former faculty	current minister in the Prime Minister of Singapore's Office	
David Hodgett	BBus (Management)	former Minister for Major Projects, Manufacturing and Ports	
George Hodges Knox	engineering classes	former Speaker of the Legislative Assembly in the Parliament of Victoria	
John Lemmon	attended [WMC], former President [WMC]	former Minister for Public Instruction; longest serving Victorian politician (51 years)	
Jenny Lindell	Dip Medical Radiation	former Speaker of the Legislative Assembly in the Parliament of Victoria	
Justin Madden	BArch	former Minister for Planning in the Parliament of Victoria; former AFL footballer	
Barry Pullen	Dip Civ Eng	former Minister for Conservation and the Environment in the Parliament of Victoria	
Gordon Rich-Phillips	BEng	former Minister for Technology and Aviation Industry in the Parliament of Victoria	
Neil Pope	Dip Bus Studies	former Minister or Education in the Parliament of Victoria	
Evan Walker	Dip Arch, FRMIT	former Minister for the Arts, Industry, Major Projects and Public Works; former architect	
James Webster	attended	former Minister for Science and the Environment in the Parliament of Australia	
Richard Worth	PhD	former Minister for Internal Affairs in the Parliament of New Zealand	

=== Members ===
Name	Association with RMIT	Notability	References
Lidia Argondizzo	BBus, MBA	former Member of the Parliament of Victoria	
Stephen Barker	former President [WMC]	former Member of the Parliament of Australia	
Donna Bauer	BComm	former Member of the Parliament of Victoria	
Anthony Carbines	BA (Journ)	current Member of the Parliament of Victoria	
Tina Nakada Grandinetti	PhD	current Member of the Hawaii House of Representatives	
Dennis Jensen	BAppSci	current Member of the Parliament of Australia	
Marlene Kairouz	Dip Health	current Member of the Parliament of Victoria	
Cyril Kennedy	Dip Art (Advertising)	former Member of the Parliament of Victoria	
Catherine King	BA (Social Work) [PIT]	current Member of the Parliament of Australia	
Jim Simmonds	attended	former Member of the Parliament of Victoria	
Robert Solly	former President [WMC]	former Member of the Parliament of Victoria	
Nick Wakeling	Grad Dip IR/HR	current Member of the Parliament of Victoria	
Lorraine Wreford	BAppSci	former Member of the Parliament of Victoria	
Jason Wood	Grad Dip Management, MAppSci	current Member of the Parliament of Australia	

=== Others ===
Name	Association with RMIT	Notability	References
Julian Burnside	D SocSci (honoris causa), former faculty	barrister, human rights advocate and author	
Percy Clarey	former President [MTC]	Delegate to the UN for Australia (1954–1957)	
Breen Creighton	faculty	labour law expert	
Don Edgar	faculty	social policy academic; adjunct professor with RMIT's Centre for Workplace Change	
Peter J. Hayes	faculty	political scientist; Executive Director of the Nautilus Institute for Security and Sustainability at RMIT	
Hamam al-Hamami	attended	Hijacker of the Flydubai Flight 1073	
James Jupp	former faculty	political scientist; director of the Centre for Immigration and Multicultural Studies at the Australian National University	
Anastasia Powell	faculty	criminologist	
Oren Yiftachel	FRMIT	political geographer; Professor of Geography at the Ben-Gurion University of the Negev	

== Health and sports ==
Note: RMIT offers degrees in applied sciences of health and life, but does not have a medical school.

=== Health industry ===
Name	Association with RMIT	Notability	References
Edward de Bono	D Des (honoris causa), former faculty	physician and psychologist	
Rhonda Galbally	D SocSci (honoris causa), former faculty	current chair of the Royal Women's Hospital, Melbourne	
Heather Horst	FRMIT	anthropologist	
John Travis	faculty	physician; proponent of the wellness movement and adjunct professor in the RMIT School of Health Sciences	
Beth Wilson	Dip Sci, D Ed (honoris causa)	current Chief Commissioner of Victoria Health Services	

=== Sports ===
Name	Association with RMIT	Notability	References
Ian Browne	attended	cyclist and Olympic and Commonwealth Games gold medallist	
Christine Envall	attended	professional bodybuilder	
Elizabeth Gardner	BAppSci (Human)	freestyle skier	
Carrie Graf	BAppSci	basketballer and former coach of the Australia women's national basketball team	
Allan Hahn	DAppSci (honoris causa), faculty	sports scientist; emeritus professor of the Australian Institute of Sport	
Steven Hooker	attended	pole vaulter and Olympic and Commonwealth Games gold medallist	
Gus Johnston	BA (Advert)	field hockey player and anti-homophobia in sports campaigner	
Lydia Lassila	B AppSci (Human)	freestyle skier and Winter Olympic Games gold medallist	
Bill Lawry	attended	former captain of the Australia national cricket team; sports commentator	
James Marburg	BA	rower and Olympic Games silver medallist	
David Morris	current student	freestyle skier	
Nick Morris	BAppSci (Human)	wheelchair basketballer and Paralympic Games gold medallist	
Elizabeth Patrick	current student	rowing coxswain	
Colin Ridgway	attended	former NFL player with Dallas Cowboys and first Australian to play in the NFL	
Jared Tallent	current student	race walker, Olympic Games silver and Commonwealth Games gold medallist	
James Tomkins	BBus	rower and three-time Olympic Games gold medallist; financial analyst	
Peter Thomson	physics classes	golfer and five-time winner of the British Open	
Max Walker	Dip Arch	former cricketer and AFL player with Melbourne Demons; architect and entrepreneur	
Charlie Walsh	former faculty	former coach of Australian national cycling team; helped develop the RMIT-AIS Olympic Superbike	
Julien Wiener	BBus (Management)	cricketer and first Jew to play for Australia	

==== Australian rules football ====
Name	Association with RMIT	Notability	References
Ron Barassi	attended	former player with Melbourne Demons and Carlton Blues and legendary coach	
Darcy Daniher	current student	current player with Essendon Bombers	
Roger Dean	attended	former player and Captain of Richmond Tigers	
John Dugdale	attended	former player with North Melbourne Kangaroos; sports commentator	
Jack Edwards	attended	former player with North Melbourne Kangaroos; sports commentator	
Keith Greig	attended	former player with North Melbourne Kangaroos and two-time Brownlow Medalist (1973, 1974)	
David Hille	B Bus	current player with Essendon Bombers	
James Hird	BEng (Hon)	former player, Captain and coach of Essendon Bombers, Browlow Medallist (1996) and civil engineer	
Tony Jewell	attended	former player with Richmond Tigers and coach of St Kilda Saints	
Bob Skilton	attended	former player with South Melbourne Swans and three-time Brownlow Medallist (1959, 1963, 1968)	
Jim Stynes	B Soc Sc, Dip Youth Work	former player and Chairman of Melbourne Demons; Brownlow Medallist (1991), businessman and youth worker	
Brian Taylor	attended	former player with Richmond Tigers and Collingwood Magpies; sports commentator	

== Science and technology ==
Name	Association with RMIT	Notability	References
Amanda Barnard	B Sci (AppPhysics) (Hon), PhD	nanotechnologist and theoretical physicist; Head of the CSIRO Nanoscience Laboratory	
Martin G. Bean	former Vice-Chancellor	technology executive; former Global Director of Microsoft and former Vice-Chancellor of Open University	
Gordon S. Brown	Dip Civil Eng, Elec Eng, Mech Eng [WMC]	cyberneticist; Emeritus professor of Electrical Engineering at MIT	
John Béchervaise	science classes	Antarctic explorer and author	
Drew Clarke	BAppSc (Surveying)	Chief of Staff to Prime Minister Malcolm Turnbull, Secretary of the Department of Communications, surveyor,	
Megan Clark	DAppSci (honoris causa), former faculty	scientist; current CEO of the CSIRO	
J. Donald R. de Raadt	FRMIT	Emeritus Professor of Informatics and System Science at Luleå University of Technology	
Graham Dorrington	faculty	aeronautical engineer; subject of the 2004 documentary The White Diamond by Werner Herzog	
Dennis Gibson	former Chancellor	mathematician	
Ranulph Glanville	former faculty	cybernetics theoretician	
Alfred Gottschalk	former faculty	biochemist and glycoprotein researcher	
Ann Henderson-Sellers	former Deputy Vice-Chancellor	former Director of the UN Climate Programme	
Arthur R. Hogg	science classes	astronomer and physicist	
Kourosh Kalantar-zadeh	attended (PhD) and also former faculty	Materials scientist, electronic engineer and Australian Research Council (ARC) Laureate Fellow; recipient of the IEEE and ACS awards	
Richard Kaner	faculty	chemist and nanotechnologist; recipient of the Tolman Award (2008)	
Lakshmi Kantam	faculty	chemist; adjunct professor and director of the IICT-RMIT Research Centre	
William Kernot	former President [WMC]	engineer, first professor of engineering at the University of Melbourne, Old Kernot Engineering School at RMIT named in his honour, Kernot Memorial Medal awarded by University of Melbourne to Australian engineers.	
Albert Kitson	geology, mining, surveying classes [WMC]	geologist; recipient of the Lyell Medal (1927)	
David Malin	D AppSci (honoris causa)	astronomer, scientific photographer	
Henry Millicer	D Eng (honoris causa); former faculty	aircraft designer	
Luca Marmorini	faculty	head of the engine and electronics department for the Ferrari F1 team	
Leslie H. Martin	faculty [WMC]	physicist, Founding Fellow of the Australian Academy of Science	
Alan Pears	faculty	environmental analyst	
Mandyam Srinivasan	former faculty	biologist	
Manfred Steger	faculty	Professor of Global Studies at RMIT and the Director of RMIT's Globalism Research Centre	
Lawrence Wackett	former faculty	Australian aircraft industry pioneer; RMIT's Lawrence Wackett Aerospace Centre named in his honour	
Heinrich Karsten Wagenfeld	former faculty	theoretical and experimental physicist	

== See also ==
- RMIT University (Australia)
- RMIT University Vietnam
