= RMIT School of Applied Communication =

- Parent institution: College of Design and Social Context, Royal Melbourne Institute of Technology
- Campus: RMIT City
- Affiliations: AFI, PRIA
- Website: RMIT School of Applied Communication (archived)

The RMIT School of Applied Communication was an Australian tertiary education school within the College of Design and Social Context of RMIT University. The school hosted RMIT's Advertising, Communication Design, Editing and Publishing, Journalism, Media, Professional Communication (a specialised hybrid-degree covering Journalism, Media and Public Relations) and its Public Relations programs. It merged with the RMIT School of Creative Media on 6 July 2009 to form the RMIT School of Media and Communication.

== Location ==
The school was headquartered in Building 6 on Bowen Street at the RMIT City campus, located in the "RMIT Quarter" at the northern end of the Melbourne CBD. However, in recent years the school has begun to outgrow its home building, and parts of the school are now also located in buildings 4 and 7 at the City campus.

The school received a new home in 2009 when it relocated to Building 9 (RMIT's historical radio communications building) at RMIT's City campus, which wunderwent a A$16.4 million refurbishment.

== Programs ==
=== Undergraduate ===
- Bachelor of Communication (Advertising)
- Bachelor of Communication (Journalism)
- Bachelor of Communication (Media)
- Bachelor of Communication (Professional Communication)
- Bachelor of Communication (Public Relations)
- Bachelor of Design (Communication Design)

Contextual Studies Strand:
Undergraduates must undertake a study strand in either: Asian Media & Culture, Cinema Studies, Business & Politics or Literature & Philosophy.

=== Postgraduate ===
- Graduate Diploma in Editing and Publishing
- Master of Communication by Coursework (in chosen stream)
- Master of Design (Communication Design)

=== Research ===
Doctor of Philosophy by Research (Applied Communication)

=== "Labsome" ===
Labsome is the RMIT School of Applied Communication's specialised honours program. Like most honours programs it is completed in one year (two semesters). Labsome is limited to a maximum of 20 students a year, who have completed a Bachelor of Communication in any stream offered by the school. Graduates must have reached the minimum academic standard of a Distinction average (70%) or better in their third year of undergraduate study to gain entry to Labsome.

== Industry and community links ==
In line with RMIT University's "industry-relevant" focus, the RMIT School of Applied Communication has appointed a number of leading figures from the communication industries to the position of adjunct professor. In addition to its regular full-time academic staff award-winning journalist Chris Masters, former CEO of Australia's largest PR firm, Turnbull Porter Novelli, Noel Turnbull, internationally renowned designer Garry Emery, and leading Australian film and television producer Ewan Burnett are all part-time faculty members of the school.

In 2003, the school was chosen by Australia's peak body for professional public relations and communication practitioners, the Public Relations Institute of Australia (PRIA), as one of only two institutions nationally to deliver its annual series of professional development courses, lectures, seminars and events.

The school also hosts a renowned public lectures series by leading Australian and international speakers. Previous notable speakers have included: Professor Terrell Carver, Director of the Global Media Research Center Professor John Downing, scientist and global warming activist Dr. Tim Flannery, Wall Street Journal editor Robert Thomson and Senator Judith Troeth.

The school has hosted the XIIIth Biennial Conference of the Film and History Association in 2006 and the 2007 Asian Cities Symposium.

== AFI Research Collection ==
The Australian Film Institute (AFI) Research Collection is a non-lending, specialist film and television industry resource. It opened in the mid-1970s as the George Lugg Library, and was a joint venture between the AFI and the Victorian Federation of Film Societies. In 2002 it became an auspice of the RMIT School of Applied Communication, in conjunction with the AFI.

The collection has particular strengths in screen history and theory and in Australian cinema, and features a diverse range of books, journals, film scripts, film directories, reports and film festival catalogues. A notable part of the original library was a rare collection of books on pre-cinema and early cinema history as-well-as early cinema artifacts, which were all part of the valuable David Francis Collection (David Francis was the founder of the UK's National Film and Television Archive), and purchased by the Victorian and Australian governments in 1975. The early cinema artifacts of the collection are now housed at the Scienceworks Museum, however, the rare books remain in the collection at RMIT.

In 2003, the Australian Broadcasting Authority donated the Henry Mayer Collection to the RMIT School of Applied Communication. Over his many years as an academic, Henry Mayer assembled and annotated a massive collection of communications literature, which is now available through the AFI Research Collection. Also included in the AFI Research Collection is the Wayne Royal Levy Collection, the personal library of the internationally respected academic, author and documentary film maker; as-well-as a substantial number of film stills from the Australian and international film industries.

== Journals and publications ==
The school publishes a number of journals, most notably the Southern Review: Communication, Politics and Culture. The Southern Review is an internationally respected, interdisciplinary journal focusing on the connections between communication and politics, and is published three times a year. It was first published in 1963 (as the Australian Journal of Literary Studies) by the English Department of the University of Adelaide, and gained its international reputation during the 1980s through the publication of innovative and influential arguments and analyses in literary and cultural theory (e.g.: early articles by Tony Bennett, Catherine Belsey, Terry Eagleton, Stephen Greenblatt, Ian Hunter, Colin MacCabe, Christopher Norris). It moved from the University of Adelaide to the Communication Department of Monash University in 1995, before finding its home in the RMIT School of Applied Communication in 2000.

== Notable alumni ==
- Julian de Stoop – journalist and head of Fox Sports News (Melbourne Bureau)
- Bob Isherwood – Worldwide creative director of Saatchi & Saatchi
- Nick Johnston – Victorian state political reporter with the Nine Network
- Rebecca Maddern – national news presenter with the Seven Network
- Chris Masters, PSM – Walkley and Logie Award winning journalist
- Louise Milligan – New South Wales state political reporter with the ABC
- Megan Spencer – journalist and documentary film maker
- Robert Thomson – editor of the Wall Street Journal and former editor of The Times

== See also ==
- RMIT University
