= RMIT School of Media and Communication =

Faculty of RMIT University in Melbourne, Australia

Coordinates: 37°48′28″S 144°57′48″E

School of Media and Communication
- Parent institution: College of Design and Social Context, Royal Melbourne Institute of Technology
- Head: Lisa French
- Campus: City
- Website: School of Media and Communication

RMIT's School of Media and Communication is an Australian tertiary education school within the College of Design and Social Context at the Royal Melbourne Institute of Technology (RMIT University), located in Melbourne, Victoria.

== History ==
The School of Media and Communication was formed by the merger of the RMIT School of Creative Media and RMIT School of Applied Communication on 6 July 2009.

In 2020 the school moved from RMIT's Building 6 to Building 10, but owing to its size, some staff remained in other buildings in the city campus.

== Description and location ==
The school hosts the university's advertising, audio visual, creative writing, editing and publishing, film and television/ radio, journalism, communication, music industry, professional communication, and public relations programs.

As of December 2024 Lisa French is dean of the School of Media and Communication.

The school is headquartered in Building 9 (RMIT's historical radio communications building) on Bowen Street at the RMIT City campus, located in the "RMIT Quarter" at the northern end of the Melbourne CBD.

== Film studies ==
As of 2002, RMIT was running a three-year television production major, within the BA Media Studies at RMIT, introducing and developing a range of skills relating to television and film production. Third-year students could develop and produce major collaborative projects with real world outcomes. 16 mm film production was also available as an elective.

As of 2025, the school offered a range of screen and media courses, including vocational qualifications, undergraduate degrees, postgraduate degrees and research degrees.

In November 2021, Bus Stop Films announced enrolments for its 40-week Accessible Film Studies Program for 2022, including a new Melbourne location.

In October 2024, RMIT partnered with AFTRS to deliver four short courses in Melbourne: Production Accounting Intensive, Intro to Producing & Screen Business, Assistant Directing Fundamentals, and Locations Department Intensive. The arrangement came about following consultation with VicScreen to identify and address critical screen industry skills shortages in Victoria. The first courses were run in December 2024.

== AFI Research Collection ==
The Australian Film Institute (AFI) Research Collection is a non-lending, specialist film and television industry resource. It opened in the mid-1970s as the George Lugg Library, and was a joint venture between the AFI and the Victorian Federation of Film Societies. In 2002 it came under the auspices of the RMIT School of Media and Communication, in conjunction with the AFI.

In 2020 the AFI Research Collection became part of the RMIT Public Engagement Group.

== ADM+S ==
In collaboration with other universities, a new Australian Research Council (ARC) Centre of Excellence, the ARC Centre of Excellence for Automated Decision-Making and Society (ADM+S), was formally launched in September 2020. The centre is headed by Julian Thomas.

== RMIT FactLab ==
RMIT FactLab is a fact-checking service registered as a research unit under the School of Media and Communication. It was launched in January 2021 with a focus on debunking COVID-19 misinformation. In December 2021, the International Fact Checking Network (IFCN) certified FactLab as a fact-checker. In August 2023, FactLab was temporarily suspended by Meta as one of the partner organisations for its fact-checking program, after it was discovered that its accreditation with IFCN had lapsed on 31 December 2022. The discovery came after Liberal senator James Paterson had written to Meta's regional policy director raising his concerns about recent fact checks on the No campaign's claims in the 2023 Australian Indigenous Voice referendum.

== Notable alumni ==
- Allan Briggs – crisis communication expert and CEO of Crisis Shield
- Julian de Stoop – journalist and former head of Fox Sports News (Melbourne Bureau)
- Bob Isherwood – professional development director at The One Club and former worldwide creative director of Saatchi & Saatchi
- Nick Johnston – general manager media and communications at National Basketball League
- Brett McLeod – Europe correspondent, adjunct professor journalism RMIT
- Rebecca Maddern – television presenter, host of Weekend Today
- Chris Masters, journalist
- Megan Spencer – journalist and documentary filmmaker
- Robert Thomson – chief executive of News Corp Australia, former editor of the Wall Street Journal and The Times
- James Wan – film producer, co-creator of the Saw film franchise
- Leigh Whannell – actor, writer and producer and co-creator of the Saw film franchise
