= Freda Freiberg =

Australian academic and critic of film and photography

- Born: Freda Fink; 18 September 1933
- Died: 26 April 2024 (aged 90)
- Education: Monash University
- Occupations: Academic, educator, critic
- Writing career
- Genres: Scholarship and critique
- Subjects: Japanese film, feminism, photography, media
- Notable work: Women in Mizoguchi Films

Freda Freiberg (née Fink; 18 September 1933 – 26 April 2024) was an Australian academic, an early educator in film history and criticism, and critic and commentator on cinema, especially that of Japanese and women filmmakers and animators, and of Australian photography. Her writings appeared in regular columns in The Age newspaper, and in scholarly, educational and media-specific journals prior to her spending her last decade as a freelance arts journalist. Beyond cinema, Freiberg engaged in cultural history and criticism, writing especially on Jewish history, particularly the experiences and representation of Jews and the Holocaust in film and culture.

== Early life ==
Born Freda Fink in Kew, Melbourne, in September 1933, Freda Freiberg, as she records in her 1965 Australian Jewish Herald essay 'Growing Up in Kew 1933–1950', was raised in a household of Polish Jewish migrants on Walpole Street within a small but growing Jewish community; she cites the ABS 1933 census figures of 109 people, increasing to 279 in 1947 and "almost 1,000" in 1954.

Freiberg was educated at Ruyton where she matriculated with Honours and the E. M. Bromby Prize for English, French and History, while receiving private Jewish instruction at home from Joseph Giligich, whom Freiberg was to remember as a 'saintly man', through the United Jewish Education Board Sunday School and the Toorak Road Centre. She described a “double life” that combined Anglican-inflected mainstream schooling and Australian cultural accomplishments—piano, elocution, dance, and sport—with immersion in Hebrew study, Yiddish literature, and the living memory of an ultra-orthodox grandfather. The United Jewish Education Board awarded her Dux of the Kew Centre, a major Jewish congregation, in 1947, as well as the Joseph Waxman Prize in 1948 and in 1949.

Freiberg's adolescence coincided with World War II and the post-1947 arrival of Jewish displaced persons in Melbourne, experiences that sharpened her sense of communal responsibility and her awareness of institutional support, from the United Jewish Overseas Relief Fund to the establishment of the Norman Smorgon House at 53 Walpole Street as a Kew social and educational centre. Freda married Martin Freiberg in Israel on 15 July 1954 at Kibbutz Tzuba, and was joined by her parents who had been traveling abroad and staying in London, and her brother who had flown over. Their daughter Lilllian celebrated her batmitvah in June 1971, and in March 1973 their son Mark held his barmitzvah, at Norman Smorgon House.

By the time she wrote, at age 31, about her memories of her childhood and teenage years, and on the history of the Jewish community Melbourne, in the Australian Jewish Herald and Australian Jewish News articles in 1965 Freiberg had completed a Bachelor of Arts (1955) and a Diploma of Education (1965) at the University of Melbourne and was teaching English in government secondary schools. At the time a lecturer at Coburg Teachers College, she gave her views on the discipline of youth in June 1972 in a debate chaired by Professor Louis Waller.

== Educator ==
Within a few years Freiberg would move into film history and criticism, begin formal study of Japanese language and cinema, and establish herself as a leading Australian specialist in Japanese film and visual culture. The 1965 Herald article expresses methodological interests—context, memory, and cross-cultural mediation—key to her later academic career; and in a 1968 article she writes there a satirical sketch of the phenomenon of the 'Jewish Geisha'—"not a Japanese Geisha, who employs all her art to create a marketable commodity—herself. Oh, no! The Jewish Geisha is designed to arrest the attention of the onlooker and to elicit envy in her fellows, but decidedly not to give herself." Freiberg's 2001 Metro Magazine response to Monique Schwarz's Mamadrama revises and dissects such caricatures of the Jewish matron.

Freiberg's first teaching was in English at government high schools before, in 1971, she undertook a Japanese major at the University of Melbourne (1971–73) then Post-Graduate studies in Japanese Language & Studies at Monash (1975–76) and an Honours thesis in the Monash Japanese Department on the representation of women in films of specialist in women's melodramas, Kenji Mizoguchi (1977–78). Contemporaneously with these Honours degrees (for all of which she was awarded H1 grades) she taught a pioneering course in film history and film criticism at Coburg Teachers College, and in 1981 lectured on 'The Women's Film' at the Council of Adult Education.

Freiberg's research into Japanese film history involved investigation in the National Diet Library in Tokyo, Japanese film archives and libraries, the Pacific Film Archive in San Francisco, the Washington Archives, the Library of Congress and the Museum of Modern Art and the British Film Institutew, while she was part-time Lecturer in Asian Cinema in the Visual Arts Department at Monash University. Subsequently, she was called on frequently to deliver guest lectures on Japanese cinema at Monash, Melbourne and La Trobe universities, and delivered a lecture on silent Japanese cinema associated with the Art Gallery of New South Wales exhibition, Modern Boy Modern Girl.

== Critic ==
Freiberg in her writings as reviewer and critic of both film and photography for Australian newspapers and journals, was forthright and in the opinion of fellow critic Adrian Martin; "a feisty soul who never stood for any bullshit", and who was unafraid of difficult subjects. Jennifer Sabine remembered her as a "dynamic and fun" interlocutor, and colleagues such as Annette Blonski noted her early advocacy for cinema studies as a serious academic discipline.

=== Cinema ===
Freiberg's cinema criticism can be characterised as internationalist and feminist and politically engaged with gender, agency, and voice, and culturally and historically oriented in reading films as ideological texts. She called out the 'European bias' of the 1975 Melbourne International Film Festival, noting the lack of entries, despite "a crowded program," from Africa, Asia and South America, a fault remedied, she noted, in the 1977 program.

In her writing Freiberg attends to form, and values experimentation and modernist strategies, and authorship. In relation to documentary practice she is skeptical of naïve realism and emotional spectacle, especially in historical cinema.

With an eye to women's role in film history, in a Metro Magazine article “Australian Film – A Celebration and a Cautionary Tale” Freiberg remarks of the silent era: “This was the first great wave of independent film-making in Australia—a time when Australian stories found their voice—albeit in silent films such as A Woman Suffers (1918), The Sentimental Bloke (1919) and On Our Selection (1920)"...“In the 1920s there were no boxes or barriers to women working in film, as evidenced by the life of Lottie Lyell—a single woman who pursued a profession.” Peter Hughes in reviewing Don't shoot darling! women's independent filmmaking in Australia of 1987 edited by Annette Blonski, Barbara Creed and Freiberg confirms how the book addresses conditions in the late 1900s: "One of the more interesting sectors of the Australian film industry of the last 15 years has been that occupied by independent women filmmakers... The book sets out to redress [an imbalance] by providing a context to the development of women's filmmaking in Australia— particularly given the lack of material in most standard sources on both women filmmakers and independent filmmakers."

Noting in 2025 that while "the 1990s was a decade of ambitious experimental filmmaking by Australian women," it was still "a comparatively under-examined domain of Australian screen culture," Loreck quotes Freiberg's perception that surrealism had found its way into Australian filmmaking of the time, specifically in non-fiction and essay films like Marie Craven's Pale Black "about the individual's need for self-actualisation: 'wanting so much to live, love and create; this woman, too, stands alone "on the shore of the wide world" and thinks'."

”In discussing A Half Century of Homesickness, 50 Years of Silence, Senso Daughters and The Murmuring, all films about the forced prostitution of 'comfort women' in WW2, Freiberg dismisses their 'melodrama' to conclude: "Only in The Murmuring does the body of the comfort woman receive explicit attention...the film concludes with a shot of the aged and wrinkled, battered and disfigured, naked body of one of the victims. It forces the viewer to confront the body as evidence of criminal misuse, not in order to titillate with voyeuristic pleasure or to shock. The camera slowly moves around this body, in a tender sympathetic gesture of love, sorrow and solidarity."

Freiberg's review of The Insect Woman (1963) is in sympathy with Shōhei Imamura's scorn for "the form and content of the output" of Shochiku Studio where he trained: "If the film celebrates the vitality and resilience of poor peasant women and prostitutes, it does not really give them a voice. It studies them as fascinating specimens. Rather than giving her a voice, the maudlin autobiographical poems spoken by Tome constitute a derisive put-down of the sentimental treatment of women’s issues and women’s experiences in Japanese film and Japanese culture."

Chambers introduces Freiberg's essay on the film China Nights as a discussion of an example of the legitimisation of Tokyo's imperialist aggression in "a genre of war films that seemingly took wartime romance and made it a metaphor for the Japanese conquest of China. In this first of a series of interracial melodramas, a manly and protective Japanese naval officer falls in love with a beautiful young Chinese street waif and molds her into a cultured, submissive wife. The melodramatic use of race and gender in a metaphoric justification of Japanese imperialism as driven by altruistic motives proved enormously popular with wartime Japanese audiences and provides important evidence about Japanese views of the war." Cholodenko agrees with Freiberg's assessment of Akira as a nihilistic postmodern inheritor of Ishirō Honda's irradiated Godzilla in its representation of nuclear war.

Freiberg was involved early in the Lip collective, and promoted feminist filmmakers, but not uncritically, in collectives such as the Sydney Women's Film Group and Reel Women, and individuals including Jeni Thornley, Margot Nash, Martha Ansara, Megan McMurchy, Margot Oliver, Sarah Gibson and Susan Lambert. The Feminist Film Workers group, Blonski, Creed, and Freiberg, in their edited collection Don't Shoot Darling!, provides in-depth analyses of the Melbourne and Sydney scenes.

=== Photography ===
Freiberg was photography critic for The Age starting in December 1994 and continuing until June 1997, and wrote on the medium elsewhere, including for the journals Photofile, eyeline, and Metro Magazine, attracted to the art form when "photography is flowering all around Melbourne. Not only is the visual arts program of the Melbourne Festival focusing on the art of photography this year, but we are finally witnessing the fruits of two decades of dedicated activity in Victorian photographic culture." Freiberg writes from clear positions on the medium; is dismissive of naïve realism, believing that photography is constructed and mediated, not a transparent copy of reality; asserting that photography should engage in debate and self-critique or else risk repeating “blind spots”, she reads images through agency, gaze, and gendered space, and is critical of glossy, clichéd, and touristic imagery that “observes without seeing.” Above all, hers is an ideological reading of images in which landscapes, bodies, and portraits are treated as social and political texts, not neutral subjects.

Among the photography exhibitions she critiqued were Chris Barry's narrative photography; Lauren Berkowitz's installation at Melbourne's Jewish Museum paired with Barry's more traditional prints; Andrew Curtis's landscape and conceptual photography; Sue Ford's feminist self-portraiture and serial practice; John Cato's formalist and spiritual dimensions of landscape; Robyn Stacey's death masks; Micky Allan's staged and autobiographical photography; Carol Jerrems' filmic documentary portraiture; Carolyn Lewens' cyanotypes; Peter Lyssiotis' provocative photomontages; Ruth Maddison's urban and social photography; Destiny Deacon's "pride in Aboriginal identity and defiance in the face of history"; Darren Sylvester's lightbox works conveying "disconnection and alienation"; Julie Rrap's computer-generated close-ups of human skin; Les Walkling's cinematic sequences; Robert Mapplethorpe's clean minimal compositions; László Moholy-Nagy's photosculptures; and Ponch Hawkes' feminist performative and serial portrait projects. In some instances her specialisations in film and photography intersected, as when she reviewed Rozalind Drummond's 1995 installation Peeping Tom (named to reference Michael Powell’s film) as: "a surreptitious peep, if not a studied gaze, at the bodies and business of others..." to "turn our gaze back on the professional peepers, to play their game. We are asked to play the sleuth."

== Publications ==
- Freiberg, Freda (1981). Women in Mizoguchi films. Melbourne, VIC.: Japanese Studies Centre. ISBN 978-0-85816-304-1.
- Freiberg, Freda (1982). "Occupied Feminism: The Rhetoric of Feminism in Japanese Films made under the American Occupation". In Hutton, Anne (ed.). The first Australian history and film conference papers. Canberra: National Library and Australian Film & Television School.
- Freiberg, Freda (1983). "The "difference" of Japanese film". In Creed, Barbara; Australian Screen Studies Association, Conference (eds.). Papers and forums on independent film and Asian cinema. 1. Australian Screen Studies Association Conference, 1982. North Ryde: Australian Film and Television School. ISBN 978-0-642-92550-3.
- Blonski, Annette; Creed, Barbara; Freiberg, Freda, eds. (1987). Don't shoot darling! women's independent filmmaking in Australia. Richmond, Australia: Greenhouse Publications. ISBN 978-0-86436-058-8.
- Blonski, Annette; Freiberg, Freda (1989). "Double trouble: women's films". In Moran, Albert; O'Regan, Tom (eds.). The Australian Screen. Ringwood, Vic.: Penguin. pp. 191–215.
- Sproul, Linda; Freiberg, Freda (1996). Linda Sproul: difficult to light : the white woman variation #2. Adelaide, S.A: Experimental Art Foundation.
- Freiberg, Freda (1996). "China Nights (Japan, 1940): The Sustaining Romance of Japan at War". In Chambers, John Whiteclay (ed.). World War II, Film, and History. David Culbert. Cary: Oxford University Press, Incorporated. pp. 31–46. ISBN 978-0-19-509967-6.
- Freiberg, Freda (1996). "Akira and the Postnuclear Sublime". In Broderick, Mick (ed.). Hibakusha Cinema: Hiroshima, Nagasaki and the Nuclear Image in Japanese Film. Hoboken: Taylor and Francis. ISBN 978-0-7103-0529-9.
- Freiberg, Freda (1997). "Out of the Family Closet". In Koop, Stuart (ed.). A Small History of Photography. Fitzroy, Vic.: Centre for Contemporary Photography. pp. 34–7. ISBN 0-646-28229-8.
- Freiberg, Freda (2001). "Blame and shame: the hidden history of the comfort women of World War II". In Creed, Barbara; Hoorn, Jeanette (eds.). Body trade: captivity, cannibalism and colonialism in the Pacific. University of Otago Press. ISBN 978-1-315-02382-3.
- Freda Freiberg and Joy Damousi (2003) ‘Engendering the Greek: The Shifting Representations of Greek Identity in Australian Cinema’, in Lisa French (ed.), Womenvision: Women and the Moving Image in Australia, Melbourne: Damned,
