= Rozalind Drummond =

Australian artist photographer, curator and academic

- Born: 1955 (age 70–71); Australia
- Education: Prahran College; Victorian College of the Arts; Goldsmiths College, London; RMIT University, Melbourne
- Occupations: Photographic artist, academic
- Known for: Photography

Rozalind Drummond (born 1955) is a Melbourne-based Australian artist and academic whose photography, performance and video deals with perceptions of alienation in urban and natural environments in which she stresses the psychology of human gaze and gesture, particularly in the condition of photographing and being photographed.

== Education ==
Drummond trained initially at Prahran College 1982-84, an institution which Australian Centre for Photography director Deborah Ely recognised in 1999 as producing "some of the country's most acclaimed practitioners" listing Drummond amongst them, beside "Bill Henson, Carol Jerrems, Steve Lojewski, Janina Green and Christopher Koller". From 1985–86 she undertook a Post Graduate Diploma in Fine Art at the School of Art in the Victorian College of the Arts where Bill Henson, as noted by Max Dupain, was her supervisor.

In 1997 she was awarded a Samstag Scholarship. Its award of A$30,000 (2025 value: $62,240.00), plus airfares and fees, funded a year of overseas study, during which she took an MA in Fine Art at Goldsmiths College, London. Co-recipients were Zhong Chen, Lyndal Jefferies, Steven Holland, and Julie Gough.

While studying meantime at Goldsmiths, Drummond was included as one of five Australian artists invited to exhibit at England's Ikon Gallery. The curator, Claire Doherty, writes that a conventional exhibition there of the Australians' work would risk it "appear[ing] without contextualisation, interpretation or dialogue in an alien territory”. Her solution was to have the five artists complete projects both "inside and outside the gallery…over extended periods of time" with local groups and individuals. Drummond responded to this "Art into Action" programme by conducting her project off-site over six months in a local school, filming the idea of 'lost childhood'.

Later in Australia she completed a Master of Arts (Art in Public Space), RMIT University, Melbourne in 2017. Since then she has exhibited nationally and internationally and her work is in major public collections.

== Educator 1987–2014 ==
After working 1986-88 as Assistant Director at George Paton Gallery, University of Melbourne, Drummond taught in academic positions: as Lecturer in Photography, Victorian College of the Arts, School of Art, Melbourne 1987-89; Lecturer in Photography, School of Art and Design, Monash University, Caulfield Campus 1990-91; and Lecturer in Photography, School of Arts and Education, Deakin University, Burwood Campus until 2014.

== Practice ==
Drummond first showed solo in May 1985 at George Paton Gallery (where she was to become assistant director the following year). Gary Catalano remarked on her fixation there with classical antiquity, that her colour photographs of a single draped figure posed against black like a sculpture "belong to what A. D. Coleman has called the directorial mode. Nothing has been left to chance in her carefully arranged images", which were accompanied by a quotation from Goethe on the "profoundly blue" music of antiquity...[a] melancholy which Drummond's text identif[ies] in her allusive images"

Less than ten years into her career, in 1993, Drummond and painter Geoff Lowe were invited by curator Juliana Engberg to produce an exhibition involving collaboration with Vietnamese artists supported by Asialink's Australian art to Asia project and hosted by the Hanoi School of Art, the nation's first contemporary art contact with Vietnam. Choosing to show typical examples of their Australian contemporary art practice, Drummond took long contact proofs—titled Voyeur and excerpted from monochrome Super 8 footage which had been made between 1960–65—which could be unrolled and pinned to the gallery wall either horizontally or vertically, allowing viewers' own interpretation of narrative, and reported that some of the Vietnamese artists were surprised she chose not to frame her photographs.

The exhibition was shown in Australia as Vietnam at the Waverley City Gallery from 25 February to 28 March 1993, in reviewing which Zara Stanhope points to "Drummond's creative acts of framing and filming," and "unsettling juxtaposition of unfamiliar, geographically distant images" which "disrupt the convention of the invisible journalistic photographer [and] Western modes of narrative and brings about reconsideration of viewing responsibilities." Drummond also included a series of untitled black-and-white photos extracted from an unfinished video she made in Vietnam in which scenes in motion were rendered blurred and out of focus. A single framed passport photo facing a group of like images at opposite ends of a long narrow space that for Stanhope signify "the individual made poweriess before structures of the mass or of nation. The passport proves the existence of the refugee and reminds us that those who cross frontiers are, like criminals, the objects ol surveillance."

Drummond's Peeping Tom (named from Michael Powell’s film) was shown at Monash University Gallery, November 1995 to February 1996. Beside found photographs it included three video screens; one showing Powell's 1960 movie; another voyeuristically tracking a woman as she weaves through museum displays; and a third with a live feed of the exhibition space in which the viewer can see themselves recorded. The sum of these parts places the audience in the role of victim and aggressor simultaneously. It is a frequently referenced work, early on by artist and writer Perry Fowler;

"Drummond has created an ‘artificial’, cryptically narrated, masculinist subjectivity. Like a psychoanalyst ‘reading’ a patient or a detective investigating a mystery, the viewer deciphers the story through ‘clues’ provided at random.The story reveals an arguably pathological perception of the feminine. Drummond’s women are shallow, monochrome beauties, naively modeling for long-forgotten amateurs. Manipulated and enlarged, they become images of a reconstituted femininity; a postmodern perception of a post-war sexuality."

On her own work in the collaborative visual research project "Flows and Catchments" conducted at Lake Bolac over 2012-2014 while she was a lecturer at Deakin University, Drummond concludes that the photograph "offers a momentary pause," an "outline of an image" and acts as a 'signpost':

Photography inevitably entails a certain characterization of reality. From being "out there" the world comes to be "inside" photographs, ... [instead] ... I am interested rather in looking, through the viewfinder, to spaces that work the other way, which suggest the potential to locate a "non-space"— where the inside suggests an outside or empty space [...] The viewer may well peer in and look for everything that appears to have been left out. Thus, the photograph becomes a recollection of what Roland Barthes calls "a disruption in the topography" -- we imagine a "beyond" that evokes a sense of melancholy or of irrevocably sliding toward it.

== Reception ==
Reviewers recognised an allusive and elliptical gaze in Drummond's oeuvre from early on in her career, with Max Dupainin 1986 describing as "intensely introverted" her imagery in The Melbourne Stage: Photographs by four post-graduates at the Australian Centre for Photography, Sydney;

"Rozalind Drummond shows 16 extremely beautiful colour pictures. As a group they are intensely poetic and charged with a very personal sense of mystery and sometimes unrelenting despair. Subdued yet passionate, delicate and sombre, thought-provoking and slightly awesome, they could all be shifting shadows of the same person. I return to these pictures again and again. In ordinary terminology they have depth. It is heartening to know that photography can thus rise so superior to actuality."

Drummond's embrace of postmodernist traits prompted perplexed reviews. Beatrice Faust slighted her contributions to the National Gallery of Victoria's 1988 Excursions into the Postmodern: Five Melbourne Photographers; New Acquisitions, writing that she had failed to make "a coherent body of work," and that beside John Gollings' studies "powerful melding of architectural, pornographic and optical images," hers were "sketchy and trivial." Juliana Engberg reviewing in Art + Australia, Drummond’s early 1989 Illusion of Plans at City Gallery identifies in her arrangement of apparently disconnected colour photographs "of urban progress — the skyscraper, the bridge, the machinery of production; as well [as] the total view of the city from across the water...identifying the narcissistic impulse of the city to grow and resemble that which it has become." Declaring the intention of the work as to “isolate the viewer's attention by emphasising the product, then to gradually insinuate a further dimension…the group of [urban] planners” and their utopian plans, Engberg notes references to photographers of the Russian revolutionary period and the work of Australian women Olive Cotton and Pat Holmes in the urban domain:

So 'Illusion of Plans' becomes a series of dramas — the drama of urban progress as reflected through a modernist plan. The narrative of the planners themselves is locked into the illusion that utopias are still possible and into the narrative of the artist who chooses to participate in the history of her media and its feminine possibilities.

Fergus Armstrong wrote in 1991 that: "Rozalind Drummond’s photographic mediation of architectural objects seems to work as if by a principle of wilful indifference. The photographs show a moment of aversion or of 'having-turned-away' which at once sees and erases the rules for living built into the urban environment," concluding that against Bill Henson's "darkly erotic visions of a fallen and benighted world," Drummond's are "a sort of elliptically scientific play-work—a kind of minor theorising with the camera," fleeting and "unconvinced" about the "order of things" but humanely "empathetic". Canberra Times critic Helen Musa understood, in 1992, that Drummond "uses photography to exploit the distance between the real and the fictional," while Stuart Koop ambiguously qualified such a response in comparing separate 1991 exhibitions by Drummond (Scopic Territories at Australian Centre for Contemporary Art) and Wolfgang Sievers' industrial photographs (at National Gallery of Victoria) to identify her...

"...apparently total abdication of authorial responsibility in [ . . . ] a dependence on everything extrinsic to the photograph which has come to characterise the critical import of postmodern photography as some kind of institutional critique; this in contrast to the intrinsic formalism of modern photography," noting "[Sievers'] (perhaps naive) confrontation of power, capital, social control, or whatever, in the construction of aesthetic forms, [while Drummond], in retreat. hopes rather to spy a random trace of their omnipresence, poking the camera into a city's spaces for a glimpse of puissance. The difference is a capitulation of sorts before the unrelenting advance of "capital" manifest in theories such as Debord's."

Greg Neville in The Age however dismissed Scopic Territories as "a cold and overstated exercise. In that at least it is a good example of the current, Post-Modern Academy style," its catalogue as "impenetrable" and the accompanying video as "interminable," and dismissed a reshowing of the images in Reflex at the Centre for Contemporary Photography, curated by Koop, as "blurry night shots of the city, such as one expects (but does not encourage) in undergraduate students."

Rebecca Lancashire, more positive in reviewing Location, at Australian Centre for Contemporary Art in 1992, notes "Rozalind Drummond's black and white Melbourne scenes, deliberately out of focus: images of flux and uncertainty," and Zara Stanhope addressing Reflex as an exhibition of ironically "bad" photography, in which Drummond's work accompanied that of Susan Fereday, Graeme Hare, Les Walking and David Stephenson, described hers as "dynamic images;"

"Abstracting the real, the works in Reflex restage the classical struggle between the expressive and the descriptive, the subjectivity of the gaze and the indexical qualities of photographic reproduction. The electric neon lighls illuminating the form of Western and Eastern cities appear out of the night in Rozalind Drummond's...They provide the viewer with only a transitory glimpse, insufficient to discern the figure in the darkness, or to culturally position oneself."

George Alexander, looking back at 1980s/early 1990s postmodern Australian photographers, writes in Photofile in 1998 of the 'rationale' of the above Reflex group, and their encounter with "the resistant nature of the medium", to propose that they...

...don't record the familiar landmarks of the suburban or natural environment, but rather invent a terra incognita, unknown territory in a landscape that is both familiar and full of hidden meaning. They overwhelm the formal qualities of the camera's graphic objectivity with a kind of opacity found way behind the eyes. A loss of identity is involved that Bataille would call 'informe', formlessness: like the haptic vision in Francis Bacon working from a photogra.ph and smearing that moment to encompass all moments. That's seeing done by the hackles on your neck, and its objective correlative is a camera whose lens has been knocked out.

Moving into installation in 1995, Drummond coordinated and exhibited in The Building 40 Project at RMIT, exhibited in a small classroom. Natalie King in an Art + Australia review described her work E–1027:

Working with volume and scale, Rozalind Drummond’s work was a homage to the architect Eileen Gray, particularly an investigation of the house ‘E-1027’ that she designed in the South of France in 1929, softened by Drummond as a felt sign. Brown shoe boxes stack to form a building, accompanied by works on paper of geometrical patterns designed by Gray for rugs. A wall drawing constructed from blue ribbon marks out the dimensions of a cube, the same structure inscribed onto the program for the project. Drummond choreographed the space with a range of materials, conflating architecture and everyday objects.

Drummond has applied a feminist visual critique to gender. Reacting to her 1996 exhibition Bunny Rug reprising American pinup photographer Bunny Yeager's self-portraits reviewer Bruce James of the Sydney Morning Herald finds himself "unpersuaded but provoked." In a 1997 issue of ArtAsiaPacific, Natalie King described the installation Peeping Tom (1995) by Drummond as, “A group of large format, toned photographs … haphazardly pinned to the gallery walls like an archive,” suggesting not an institution but the “archive” as a collection of related things (whether in subject or form), inviting, as Freda Freiberg remarked, "a surreptitious peep, if not a studied gaze, at the bodies and business of others..." and to "turn our gaze back on the professional peepers, to play their game. We are asked to play the sleuth."

However, reviewing more conventional imagery in Perfect for Every Occasion at Heide Museum of Modern Art in 2007, critic Robert Nelson dismissed as "feeble happy snaps," her portraits of youths; "Even the scene where one girl touches another, which is given the dramatic title Now Everyone Knows, seems unmomentous."

Penny Webb writing on Durmmond's 2007 collaborative show with Stuart Bailey, Carpetweed, at Victoria Park Gallery, Abbotsford, discerns a more effective "exchange ... established between these two bodies of work - six photographs pinned around the space; six constructions on the floor: a meeting of minds, you might say. Rozalind Drummond has cast a dispassionate eye on piles of materials and objects, discarded or yet to be claimed, in the process of some sort of office move or domestic upheaval."

== Selected exhibitions ==
=== Solo and joint ===
- 2022: We were there, shifting space’ a group of images, was exhibited in Light Boxes; at Carlton Library, supported by Yarra City Arts
- 2018: Process blue, nature trips, corduroy, pine shelving, Bundoora Homestead Art Centre
- 2018: Aries Rising, (with Anna White) The Alderman, Upstairs, Brunswick
- 2013: Black Mountain, PopUP Chiyodo, Asia Youth Centre Tokyo, Japan
- 2011: Black Mountain, (with Stuart Bailey) Margaret Lawrence Gallery, VCA
- 2010, 16 June – 30 June: While We Were Shopping, West Space gallery
- 2009: How Fine the Air, Life Lab Building, pop-up Space, Docklands, Melbourne
- 2008: Weather Everything, Canberra Contemporary Art Space, Canberra
- 2008: Carpetweed (with Stuart Bailey) Victoria Park Gallery, Melbourne
- 2008: Low Level Week, (with Stuart Bailey) Project Space, RMIT, Melbourne
- 2007, 27 April – 26 May: Rozalind Drummond: weather everything, Canberra Contemporary Art Space
- 2004: Disordered Landscapes, Harry Siedler Apartment, Campbell, Canberra
- 2002: Branded, Cinch, Levi’s Flagship Store Gallery, Soho, London
- 2001: 48Hours, Bloomberg News European Headquarters, London
- 1998: Spiderbox, (with Lauren Berkowitz) Canberra Contemporary Art Space
- 1999: Hide and Seek screening Birmingham Cinema, United Kingdom
- 1999: Hide and Seek, exhibition Ikon Gallery Off-site Project
- 1995-6: Peeping Tom, Project Room, Monash University Gallery, Melbourne
- 1996: Bunny Rug, Pendulum Gallery, Surrey Hills, Sydney
- 1995, 27 October–15 December: Rozalind Drummond project room exhibition. Monash University Gallery
- 1995: Bunny Rug, 1st Floor, Fitzroy, Melbourne
- 1995, 5–23 July: Faktura, Kate Daw, Troy Framstead, Elka Varga and Dana Last, Stop 22, St Kilda
- 1993, 25 February–28 March: Vietnam: a project by Rozalind Drummond and Geoff Lowe, Waverley City Gallery
- 1993: Pool, Karyn Lovegrove Gallery, Prahran
- 1991, 3 October–10 November: Rozalind Drummond: Scopic Territories, curated by Juliana Engberg, Australian Centre for Contemporary Art
- 1991: Shadow Zone: Rosalind Drummond, Contemporary Art Centre of South Australia
- 1990 to 30 June: Rozalind Drummond; Mutlu Cerkez. City Gallery, Melbourne
- 1989: Illusion of Plans. City Gallery, Melbourne
- 1988: Faite urbaine, Hobart
- 1985, May: George Paton Gallery, University of Melbourne

=== Group ===
- 2024, 25 October–23 November: Dark Matter 2024, Rozalind Drummond, Claire Paul, Phoebe Kelly, Sari Sutton. photo access Gallery, Manuka Arts Centre, A.C.T.
- 2024, 15 August–12 October: Mullins Conceptual Photography Prize 2024
- 2024, 13 June–29 June: Canberra Contemporary Photographic Prize
- 2020, 12–19 December: Hell n' Back, fundraiser Caves gallery, Melbourne
- 2020: Small Mercies, Bushfire Art Fundraiser, Melbourne
- 2020, 15 February–15 March: Art Aid, Gippsland Art Gallery, Victoria
- 2007: Perfect for Every Occasion: Photography Today: Andrew Best, Gary Carsley, Rozalind Drummond, Cherine Fahd, Chantal Faust, Rebecca Ann Hobbs, Alex Kershaw, Mark Kimber, Geoff Kleem, Paul Knight, Vanila Netto, Debra Phillips, Patrick Pound, Lynne Roberts-Goodwin, Sarah Ryan, Darren Sylvester, Simon Terrill, Justene Williams. Heide Museum of Art
- 2000, 5 May–3 June: Ways of Living. Goldsmiths' College class of '98 alumni Rozalind Drummond, DJ Simpson, Oliver Zwink, Edward Harper, Graham Little and Michael Raedecker. Curated by Rozalind Drummond. Tablet Gallery At The Tabernacle, Powis Square, London W11
- 2019: The Look, National Portrait Gallery Canberra
- 2018: Express Yourself, National Portrait Gallery Canberra
- 2016, 15 July to 16 October: Tough and Tender, Robert Mapplethorpe, Larry Clark, Nan Goldin, Collier Schorr, Chris Burden, Rozalind Drummond and Warwick Baker, National Portrait Gallery, Australian Capital Territory
- 2012, Face to face: Deakin University creative artists respond to the Deakin University art collection, Deakin University Art Gallery
- 2010, 10-22 December: Found refractions: Fiona Abicare, Rozalind Drummond, Masato Takasaka, Andrea Tu. Sarah Scout, Level 1, 1a Crossley St, Melbourne
- 2009, from 22 July: The Black Show, C3 GALLERY at Abbotsford Convent
- 1998, 15–31 October: Respond Red or Blue, with Lauren Berkowitz, Pat Brassington, Tara Gilbee, Marion Harper, Deborah Ostrow, Nicola Loder, Royal Melbourne Hospital
- 1998, 23 May–13 June: Mnemosyne or Do Humans Dream in Negative Strips, Centre for Contemporary Photography, Fitzroy
- 1997, Ikon in the City Program, Ozells Street, Primary School, Brindleyplace Birmingham
- 1997, August: M CP Leica Documentary Photography Exhibition, Centre for Contemporary Photography, Fitzroy.
- 1995, August–November: The Building 40 Project, RMIT
- 1993, December: Reflex, Rozalind Drummond, Susan Fereday, Graeme Hare, Les Walking and David Stephenson, curated by Stuart Koop, Centre for Contemporary Photography, Fitzroy
- 1992: 13 Nov–20 Dec: Location, Australian Centre for Contemporary Art
- 1991: From the empire´s end – nine australian photographers : On the shadow line – ten Spanish photographers, with Sue Ford; Peter Elliston; Tracey Moffatt; Linda Dement; Bill Henson; Adrian Hall; Judith Ahern; Hellen Grace; Javier Vallhonrat; Chema Madoz; Toni Catany; Néstor Torrens; Gonzalo Careaga; Koldo Chamorro; Antonio Bueno; Tomy Ceballos; Ramón David; Paco Salinas, Círculo de Bellas Artes, Madrid
- 1989, Ou est la femme? Louise Forthun, Susan Wyers, Christine Adams, Rozalind Drummond, Merilee Bennett, Lauren Williamson, Dora McPhee, May Lam. George Paton Gallery, Melbourne
- 1998/9, 9–20 December, 17–28 January: Vasari revisited: a kunstkammer in Melbourne. Suzannah Barta, Stephen Bram, Angela Brennan, Gavin Brown, Tony Clark, Rebecca Driffield, Rozalind Drummond, Louise Forthun, Helena Gleeson, Michael Graf, Louise Harper, Mutlu Hassan, Andrew Lehman, John MacKinnon, Ann Marie May, Rod McLeish, Dora McPhee, Paul Morgan, Louise Murray, Elizabeth Newman, Amanda Ritson, Joanne Ritson, Ian Russell, Anne Weir. 200 Gertrude Street Gallery, Melbourne
- 1987, 25 August–13 September: Survey of Contemporary Australian Photography, with Polly Borland, Graeme Hare, Phillip Le Measurier, Fiona McDonald, Kevin Wilson, curated by Anna Weis and Luba Bilu, Linden Gallery, St Kilda, Victoria
- 1987, 17 June–11 July: Quiddity (a Still Life exhibition). Gertrude Contemporary Art Spaces
- 1986, 16 Oct–19 Nov: The Naked Image: The Nude in Recent Australian, Photography, Australian Centre for Contemporary Art
- 1986, February/March: The Melbourne Stage: Photographs by four post-graduates, with Cassandra Lehman, Scham Ali-Elias and Fiona Macdonald, curated by Martyn Jolly, Australian Centre for Photography, Sydney
- 1985: Material Pleasures, touring exhibition of fashion from the Fashion Design Council with photographs by Jacqui Henshaw, Ashley Evans, Philip Masurier, Rozalind Drummond and Kate Gollings. McClelland Gallery, Langwarrin to 17 August; Westpac Gallery, Victorian Arts Centre, 19 August to 15 September; Benalla Art Gallery, 20 September to 3 October; Shepparton Arts Centre 8 October to 22 October; La Trobe Valley Arts Centre, Morwell, 26 October to 14 November; Sale Regional Arts Centre, 15 November to 7 December.
- 1985, 16 July–3 August: Four Melbourne artists: IMA/George Paton Gallery exchange exhibition. Christopher van der Craats, Rozalind Drummond, Fiona MacDonald, Stieg Persson, curated by Denise Robinson

== Curator ==
- 2020: Future Ourselves, Scenes. Bus Projects, Collingwood Yards
- 2014: Kaleidoscope, Platform Contemporary Art Space, Melbourne
- 2014: Wild Places, Motorworks Gallery, Melbourne
- 2005: Deep Purple, Manning Clark House, Canberra
- 2004: Lost in Space, ANU, School of Visual Arts, Residency, Canberra
- 2002: Hard Candy, Galerie Wieland, Berlin, Germany
- 2002: Ways of Living, touring Tablet Gallery, Notting Hill, London and Project Space, RMIT University, Melbourne
- 1995, August–November: The Building 40 Project, RMIT

== Publications ==
- Drummond, Rozalind (1991). Sceptic Territories. Melbourne: Australian Centre for Contemporary Art affiliated with Monash University. ISBN 0947220100.
- Drummond, Rozalind; King, Natalie (1995). Peeping Tom / Rozalind Drummond. Clayton, Vic.: Monash University Gallery. ISBN 0732606322.
- Engberg, Juliana; Drummond, Rozalind; Lowe, Geoff (1992). Vietnam: a project by Rozalind Drummond & Geoff Lowe. Carlton, Vic.: Asialink Centre, University of Melbourne. ISBN 0732505038.
- McCarthy, Caroline; Drummond, Rozalind (1999). Ways of living, 9th-26th of March, 1999; curated by Rozalind Drummond (exhibiton catalogue ed.). Carlton, Victoria: RMIT University, Project Space.

== Collections ==
- Australian National Gallery
- National Gallery of Victoria
- Art Gallery of South Australia
- National Portrait Gallery, Canberra
- City of St Kilda
- Monash University
- BP Australia
- Melbourne City Council

== Awards and prizes ==
- 2024: Canberra Contemporary Photographic Prize
- 2022: National Photographic Portrait Prize, finalist
- 2010: National Photographic Portrait Prize, finalist
- 1997: Samstag Scholarship
- 1986: Trustees of the National Gallery of Victoria Award
- 1989: BP Acquisitive Artworkz One Prize
