= Cartoon physics =

Jocular system of physical laws for animated cartoons

Cartoon physics or animation physics are terms for a jocular system of laws of physics (and biology) that supersedes the normal laws, used in animation for humorous effect.

Many of the most famous American animated films, particularly those from Warner Bros. and Metro-Goldwyn-Mayer studios, indirectly developed a relatively consistent set of such "laws" which have become de rigueur in comic animation. They usually involve things behaving in accordance with how they appear to the cartoon characters, or what the characters expect, rather than how they objectively are. In one common example, when a cartoon character runs off a cliff, gravity has no effect until the character notices there is nothing under their feet.

In words attributed to Art Babbitt, an animator with the Walt Disney Studios, "Animation follows the laws of physics—unless it is funnier otherwise."

== Examples ==
Specific reference to cartoon physics extends back at least to June 1980, when an article "O'Donnell's Laws of Cartoon Motion" appeared in Esquire. A version printed in V.18 No. 7 p. 12, 1994 by the Institute of Electrical and Electronics Engineers in its journal helped spread the word among the technical crowd, which has expanded and refined the idea.

O'Donnell's examples include:

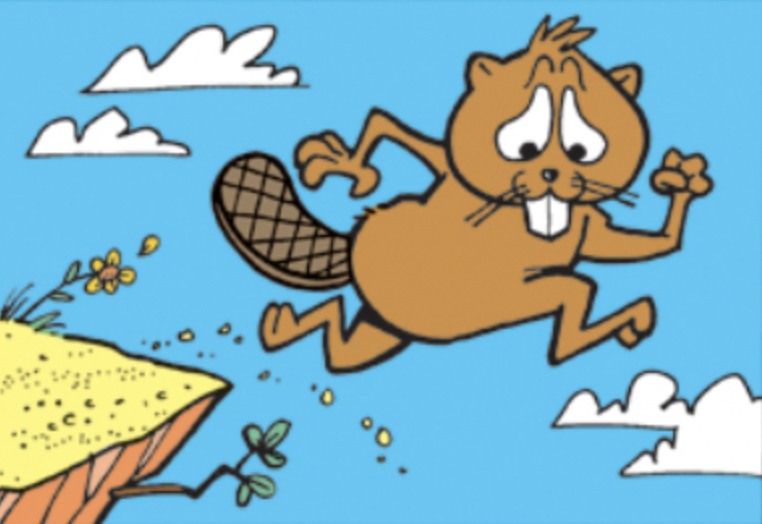
A cartoon character who runs over a cliff may have time to react to their predicament before beginning to fall

- Any body suspended in space will remain suspended in space until made aware of its situation. A character steps off a cliff but remains in midair until looking down, then the familiar principle of 16 feet per second squared takes over.
- A body passing through solid matter will leave a perforation conforming to its perimeter called the silhouette of passage.
- The time required for an object to fall 20 stories is greater than or equal to the time it takes for whoever knocked it off the ledge to spiral down 20 flights to attempt to capture it unbroken. Such an object is inevitably priceless; the attempt to capture it, inevitably unsuccessful.
- All principles of gravity are negated by fear.
- Psychic forces are sufficient in most bodies for a shock to propel them directly away from the ground. A spooky noise or an adversary's signature sound will introduce motion upward, usually to the cradle of a chandelier, a treetop or the crest of a flagpole.
- The feet of a running character or the wheels of a speeding auto need never touch the ground, ergo fleeing turns to flight.
- As speed increases, objects can be in several places at once.

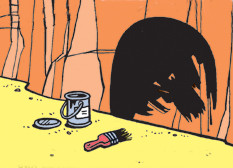
A painted tunnel entrance may or may not be traversable

- Certain bodies can pass through a solid wall painted to resemble tunnel entrances; others cannot. ... Whoever paints an entrance on a wall's surface to trick an opponent will be unable to pursue him into this theoretical space. The painter is flattened against the wall when he attempts to follow into the painting. This is ultimately a problem of art, not science.
- Any violent rearrangement of feline matter is impermanent. Cartoon cats can be sliced, splayed, accordion-pleated, spindled or disassembled, but they cannot be destroyed. After a few moments of blinking self-pity, they reinflate, elongate, snap back or solidify.

== History of the idea ==
The idea that cartoons behave differently from the real world, but not randomly, is virtually as old as animation. Walt Disney, for example, spoke of the plausible impossible in 1956 on an episode of the Disneyland television program.

Warner Bros.' Looney Tunes and Merrie Melodies series had numerous examples of their own cartoon physics (such as in the Wile E. Coyote and the Road Runner cartoons) or even acknowledged they ignore real world physics. In High Diving Hare (1948), when Yosemite Sam cuts through a high diving board Bugs Bunny is standing on, the ladder and platform that Sam is on falls, leaving the cut plank suspended in mid-air. Bugs turns to the camera and cracks: "I know this defies the law of gravity, but, you see, I never studied law!"

After being seen on the big screen, cartoon physics was soon taken down to the small screen through many shows from Hanna-Barbera, where Yogi Bear and Boo Boo and the rest of the anthropomorphic animals used it many times.

The animated television series Tiny Toon Adventures had an episode dedicated to it "Toon Physics", in which Orson Whales teaches how it differs from actual science.

More recently, it has been explicitly described by some cartoon characters, including Bugs Bunny, Daffy Duck, Tom, Jerry, Roger Rabbit, Bonkers D. Bobcat, Yakko Warner, Wakko Warner, and Dot Warner, who say that cartoon characters are allowed to bend or break natural laws for the purposes of comedy. Doing this is extremely tricky, so, the cartoon characters have a natural sense of comedic timing, giving them inherently funny properties. In Who Framed Roger Rabbit, for example, Roger is unable to escape handcuffs for most of a sequence, doing so only to use both hands to hold the table still while Eddie Valiant attempts to saw the cuffs off. When Eddie asks, exasperated, "Do you mean to tell me you could've taken your hand out of that cuff at any time?!" Roger responds: "Not at any time! Only when it was funny!" Several aspects of cartoon physics were discussed in the film's dialogue, and the concept was a minor plot theme.

In 1993, Stephen R. Gould, then a financial training consultant, wrote in New Scientist, said that "... these seemingly nonsensical phenomena can be described by logical laws similar to those in our world. Nonsensical events are by no means limited to the Looniverse. Laws that govern our own Universe often seem contrary to common sense." This theme is also described by Alan Cholodenko in his article, "The Nutty Universe of Animation".

In a Garfield animated short entitled "Secrets of the Animated Cartoon", the characters Orson and Wade give demonstrations of different laws of the cartoons and show humorous examples of them.

In 2012 O'Donnell's Laws of Cartoon Motion were used as the basis for a presentation and exhibition by Andy Holden at Kingston University in Great Britain. Titled 'Laws of Motion in a Cartoon Landscape', it explored ideas of cartoon physics in relation to art and the end of art history. This was later made into a film with the artist as an animated cartoon character and shown at Glasgow International Festival in 2016, Tate Britain in 2017, and Future Generation Art Prize at Venice Biennale in 2017.

== Non-exclusivity ==
Cartoon physics is not limited to physics. For example, when a character recovers impossibly fast from a serious injury, the laws of biology rather than physics are being altered.

It is also not limited to cartoons; in live-action, the physics-defying stunts would fall under the umbrella of slapstick. Live-action shows and movies can also be subject to the laws of cartoon physics, explaining why, for example, The Three Stooges did not go blind from all the eye-poking, and the burglars in the Home Alone series survive life-threatening booby traps. In the live-action Pete's Dragon (1977), the ostensible lead dragon Elliot, while invisible, bursts through a wooden wall, leaving a dragon-shaped "silhouette of passage". The Ernest P. Worrell film series often made note of the title character's cartoon-like traits, with Ernest himself remarking in Ernest Rides Again that he would be dead "if I wasn't this close to being an actual cartoon."

In a review of one of the Home Alone films, film critic Roger Ebert noted that in the case of live-action productions, cartoon physics are not as effective at producing a comic effect, as the effects seem more realistic:

Most of the live-action attempts to duplicate animation have failed, because when flesh-and-blood figures hit the pavement, we can almost hear the bones crunch, and it isn't funny.

Printed cartoons have their own family of cartoon physics "laws" and conventions. Additionally, some video games utilize these elements during their cutscenes. For example, in the game Sonic Unleashed, the titular character Sonic the Hedgehog is seen making effective use of hammerspace to stash a Chaos Emerald. The concept can be used as a metaphor outside video. In an editorial for the New York Times in 2003 titled Don't Look Down, for example, economist Paul Krugman wrote while describing a gap between revenue and spending, "The crisis won't come immediately. For a few years, America will still be able to borrow freely, simply because lenders assume that things will somehow work out.... But at a certain point we'll have a Wile E. Coyote moment. For those not familiar with the Road Runner cartoons, Mr. Coyote had a habit of running off cliffs and taking several steps on thin air before noticing that there was nothing underneath his feet. Only then would he plunge. What will that plunge look like?"

== See also ==
- Comic book death
- Acme Corporation
- Slapstick
- Twelve basic principles of animation
