= Allan Briggs =

Allan Briggs may refer to:

- Allan Briggs (sport shooter)
- Allan Briggs (businessman)
