= Yihwen Chen =

Malaysian documentary filmmaker (born 1985)

- Born: 1985 (age 40–41)
- Education: RMIT School of Creative Media
- Occupations: Filmmaker; journalist
- Years active: 2010–present

Yihwen Chen (born 1985) is a Malaysian documentary filmmaker and journalist. Her body of work primarily revolves around human rights, gender inequality as well as social and environmental justice.

== Early life and education ==
Chen studied Creative Media in Film & TV Production at RMIT School of Creative Media in Melbourne.

== Career ==
Chen's debut short film Like Toy Dolls won the BMW Shorties Malaysia Grand Prize in 2010 including a RM75,000 (around $25,000) grant. The money was used to fund Chen's next short film Memoria, starring two young girls and dealing with "betrayal [and] healing". It premiered as part of the International Competition selection at the GwangHwaMun International Short Film Festival (GISFF), then called Asiana International Short Film Festival after the Korean airline who sponsored it, in 2011.

After years of working on documentaries for Netflix, BBC, CNA, History, CNN International and Crime & Investigation Network, Chen returned to directing her own films in 2019 with the documentary short The Hidden Cut, tackling female circumcision. Later that same year her debut feature-length documentary on Malaysia's blind football team, Eye on the Ball, premiered in London. Her next docu-short The Boys Club (2021) reflects on the sexual harassment, bullying and misogyny that Chen had to endure in the making of Eye on the Ball, which eventually led to her having to leave her workplace. The short has been selected by the Busan International Short Film Festival and became the first Malaysian documentary to win the NETPAC award. Chen has spoken out about wanting to use the film to push for anti-sexual harassment legislation and organise panel discussions around it.

In 2025 Chen's second feature-length documentary Queer As Punk premiered at the 75th Berlin International Film Festival. The film follows the Malaysian LGBTQ punk band "Shh...Diam!". Shot over six years Chen captures the lead singer Faris' transition journey, individual portraits with the band members and the societal challenges queer and trans people face in Malaysia. The result has been described as a "music documentary that pushes past the genre’s boundaries". It was acquired by French distributor Mediawan Rights in February 2025.

== Filmography ==
Year	Title	Director	Producer	Notes	Ref(s).
2010	Like Toy Dolls	Yes	Yes	Short film	
2011	Memoria	Yes	Yes	Short film	
2019	The Hidden Cut	Yes	—N/a	Documentary short	
2019	Eye on the Ball	Yes	Yes	Documentary feature	
2021	The Boys Club	Yes	Yes	Documentary short	
2024	Queer As Punk	Yes	Yes	Documentary feature	

== Awards and nominations ==
Year	Association	Category	Nominated work	Result	Ref(s).
2010	BMW Shorties Malaysia	Grand Prize	Like Toy Dolls	Won	
2011	GISFF	International Competition	Memoria	Nominated	
2019	Society of Publishers in Asia	Excellence in Reporting Women's Issues	The Hidden Cut	Won	
2022	Busan International Short Film Festival	NETPAC Award	The Boys Club	Won	
2025	Guadalajara International Film Festival	Maguey Award	Queer As Punk	Nominated	
