= The Movie Show =

1986–2008 Australian TV series

- Presented by: David Stratton (1986–2004); Margaret Pomeranz (1986–2004); Megan Spencer (2004–2006); Fenella Kernebone (2004–2006); Jaimie Leonarder (2004–2006); Marc Fennell (2004–2006); Lisa Hensley (2007–2008); Michael Adams (2007–2008)
- Country of origin: Australia
- Original language: English
- No. of seasons: 22

Production
- Running time: 30 mins (1986–2006); 10 mins (2007–2008)

Original release
- Network: SBS One
- Release: 30 October 1986 – 2008

The Movie Show is an Australian film review program which was broadcast on SBS TV. Its history is divided into three parts, until it finally wound up in 2008.

== History ==
The programme commenced on 30 October 1986 with David Stratton and Margaret Pomeranz as hosts. They rated movies between half a star and five stars, informed about industry news and reported from film festivals such as in Cannes, Berlin and Venice. An attraction of the programme were the occasional disagreements of the hosts. Stratton and Pomeranz presented the show for the last time on 12 May 2004 and left SBS because of a perceived "dumbing down" of the broadcaster, and joined the ABC where they hosted from July of that year until the end of 2014 At the Movies, which had a very similar format.

SBS continued The Movie Show, which underwent a style change with a view to become more attractive to youth. Megan Spencer, Fenella Kernebone and Jaimie Leonarder were brought in as new hosts. Marc Fennell presented a segment reviewing newly released DVDs. The final episode of The Movie Show aired in 2006.

From 2007 to 2008, The Movie Show returned with a new interactive 10-minute format, presented by Lisa Hensley and Michael Adams.

== See also ==
- List of Australian television series
- List of longest-running Australian television series
