= Fenella Kernebone =

Australian journalist

- Born: 8 June 1976 (age 50); Sydney, Australia
- Known for: Art Nation; Triple J The Movie Show; By Design; The Sound Lab "Sunday Arts"
- Website: fenellakernebone.com

Fenella Kernebone (/ˈkɜːrnəboʊn/ KUR-nə-bohn; born 8 June 1976) is an Australian radio and television presenter, MC and interviewer, based in Sydney, with a long record working across the arts, film, music, design, architecture and culture. Her most recent hosting roles include the presenter of By Design on Radio National and The Sound Lab on Triple J. In June 2016, she was appointed Head of Curation for TEDxSydney.

== Early life ==
Fenella Kernebone grew up in Homebush, in Sydney's Inner West. She was educated at the Presbyterian Ladies' College, Sydney in Croydon, New South Wales.

A portrait of Kernebone by Nick Stathopolous called "Art Does Belong", was a finalist in the 2012 Archibald Prize.

== Radio ==
While studying at the University of Technology, Sydney, Kernebone began volunteering at Sydney community radio station 2SER. She started at Triple J in 1998 and began presenting the Triple J's arts program Creatures of the Spotlight (Sunday nights 9-11PM pre 1999), which was later renamed Artery (1999–2003).

From 2003 - 2014, Kernebone presented the cult electronic music show The Sound Lab on Triple J. After 11 years on air, she announced that she was finishing her program in December 2014, with the final show going to air on 14 December 2014. At the beginning of 2012 she began a new role as the host of By Design on Radio National, with the final program going to in later January 2015.

In June 2015, Kernebone announced she was producing and presenting a new podcast focused on Australian electronic music, called Trackwork.

== Television ==
Between 2004 and 2006, Kernebone was co-host on the revamped Movie Show on SBS TV, with Jaimie Leonarder, Megan Spencer and Marc Fennell.

After her time at SBS, she was a presenter and reporter on ABC TV's (Australian Broadcasting Corporation) Sunday Arts programme from 2007 – 2009.

From 2010 - 2012 was the host of ABC TV's arts show, Art Nation every Sunday on ABC1.

== Presenter ==
Kernebone's MC roles have included the WA and NSW Institute of Architects Awards, APRA Art Music Awards, Semi Permanent and the 200th Anniversary of Royal Doulton. In 2014, 2015 and 2016 she anchored the TEDxSydney live stream at the Sydney Opera House.

She has been an elected board member of the National Trust of Australia (NSW) since 2018.
