= RMIT School of Health Sciences =

The RMIT School of Health Sciences was an Australian tertiary education school within the College of Science Engineering and Health of the RMIT University.

== See also ==
- RMIT University
