= Society for Animation Studies =

International society of animation history

Society for Animation Studies Logo

The Society for Animation Studies (SAS) is an international learned society dedicated to the study of animation history and theory. It was founded by Harvey Deneroff in 1987. As of 2022 its president is Chris Pallant.

The Society's main aims are the organization of a yearly conference for members to present their research, publication of peer-reviewed conference proceedings in the Society's online journal, Animation Studies, and the general exchange of knowledge amongst its members.
