= Maryam Al Zadjali =

Omani artist and fine arts organisation leader

Maryam Al Zadjali (Arabic: مريم الزدجالي) is an Omani painter, whose work is inspired by Omani traditions and Islamic artistic practices. In 2008 she was appointed Director of the Omani Society for Fine Arts (OSFA).

== Career ==
Al Zadjali began her career as an artist in the 1980s. Throughout her career she has been inspired by Omani traditional motifs and Islamic artistic styles. She graduated from RMIT University with an MA in Art Administration in 2003. She had previously studied for an undergraduate degree in Philosophy and Psychology. She was appointed Director of the Omani Society for Fine Arts (OSFA) in 2008, and under her leadership the organisation has expanded its programme of activities with the ambition of placing Oman's artistic heritage on a global stage.

In 2012 she was one of eight Arab artists to present work at the "Women in Art" event at the Federico Socondo Association in Bari, Italy. In 2019 she presented with an artwork by Kavitha Ramakrishna, which depicts an Omani khanjar in the Tanjore-style of painting. The same year, under the supervision of the Ministry of Heritage and Culture, al Zadjali began a project at the village of Imti, entitled “To Immortalise the Archaeological Moment in Art”. The project encourages archaeological tourism to the village, through the installation of artistic interventions such as wall-paintings. In 2021, al Zadjali exhibited as part of a digital exhibition hosted by Kuwaiti National Council for Culture, Arts and Literature (NCCAL). Her works are held in public collections, including that of the Syrian Ministry of Culture.
