= Palazzo Editions =

UK publishing company

- Parent company: Gemini Books Group
- Country of origin: United Kingdom
- Headquarters location: London
- Distribution: Grantham Book Services (UK); Peribo (Australia)
- Publication types: Books
- Official website: www.palazzoeditions.com

Palazzo Editions is a publishing company based in Barnes, London, southern England. The company produces illustrated books covering the areas of architecture, art, biography, children's books, fantasy, popular culture, and history.

ISBNs for books published by Palazzo Editions start with 978-1786750.

In 2023, Palazzo Editions was acquired by Gemini Books Group.
