= Alan Cholodenko =

Scholar and theoretician

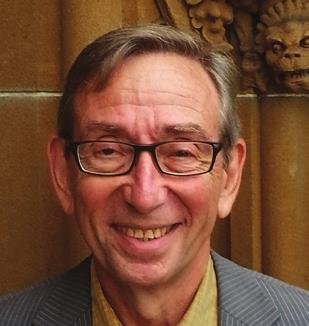
Alan Cholodenko

Alan Robert Cholodenko is an American-Australian scholar, film and animation theorist. His most recognized work are two of the earliest publications in the field of animation studies, namely The Illusion of Life: Essays on Animation, published in 1991, and The Illusion of Life II: More Essays on Animation, published in 2007. His work in the field was reviewed by animation and film scholars Richard Leskosky and Vivian Sobchack. Cholodenko's work has been featured in such publications as the International Journal of Baudrillard Studies and Animation: An Interdisciplinary Journal, as well as in the anthologies Animating Film Theory; Erasure: The Spectre of Cultural Memory; and Animation: Critical and Primary Sources.

Throughout his career, Cholodenko has been proposing a theory of animation conjoining animation theory with film theory and both with 'poststructuralist' and 'postmodernist' French thought, especially inspired by the work of Jacques Derrida and Jean Baudrillard.

== Career ==
Alan Cholodenko organized The Illusion of Life, the world's first international conference on animation, in Sydney in 1988.

He organized the second international conference on animation, The Life of Illusion, in Sydney in 1995, on post-World War II animation in Japan and the United States, held at the Japan Cultural Centre and the Museum of Contemporary Art. As a result of both conferences, Cholodenko edited two books: The Illusion of Life: Essays on Animation, in 1991, and The Illusion of Life 2: More Essays on Animation, in 2007.

Alan Cholodenko was the recipient of the 2010 McLaren-Lambart Award for Best Scholarly Article on Animation from the Society for Animation Studies for his article 'The Animation of Cinema', where he revisited the legacy of early film animator Émile Reynaud.

He has been a member of the Society for Animation Studies since its founding in 1987.

Cholodenko appeared in Orson Welles' last film, the documentary Filming Othello (1978), asking Welles questions from the audience at the Orson Welles Cinema in Cambridge, Massachusetts.

He also appeared in the documentary Derrida (2002), directed by Amy Kofman Ziering and Kirby Dick, walking and talking with Derrida in Washington Square Park, Greenwich Village, New York.

In 2024, he was admitted as Honorary Fellow of The University of Sydney in a ceremony honoring his life achievements.
