= Nautilus Institute for Security and Sustainability =

American global policy think tank founded in 1992

- Formation: 1992; 34 years ago
- Founder: Peter J. Hayes; Lyuba Zarsky
- Type: Public policy think tank
- Tax ID no.: 95-3608292
- Legal status: Non-profit corporation
- Purpose: Policy analysis
- Headquarters: 2342 Shattuck Avenue Suite #300; Berkeley, CA 94704, United States
- Locations: Seoul, South Korea; Melbourne, Australia
- Region served: Asia-Pacific
- Fields: International development; International affairs; Defence and security; Sustainability and sustainable development
- Official language: English; Korean; Taiwanese Mandarin; Japanese; Russian
- Executive Director: Peter Hayes
- Deputy Director and Senior Scenarist: Joan Diamond
- Research Officer: Arabella Imhoff
- Senior Associate: David Von Hippel
- Revenue: ▲US$880,190 (2019)
- Expenses: ▲US$792,508 (2019)
- Website: nautilus.org

The Nautilus Institute for Security and Sustainability is a public policy think tank founded in 1992. The Institute convenes scholars and practitioners who conduct research to address interconnected global problems such as threats of nuclear war, urban and energy insecurity, and climate change in the Asia Pacific region.

The Institute has been mentioned in stories in media such as the Financial Times, Foreign Policy, Radio Australia, and others.

== Research and programs ==
In 2000, one of the Institutes ongoing programs was the U.S.-DPRK Village Wind Power Project located at Unhari Village, North Korea. In 2004, research was conducted on sustainable international investment for sustainable development by Lyuba Zarsky, who was senior associate at the Institute at the time. An analysis was conducted in 2011 of North Korea's expanding mobile-communications, by senior researcher at the Institute, Alexandre Y. Mansourov.

In 2014, the Institute was part of the Asian Energy Security Project and coordinated regional research in China, Japan, Vietnam, and North and South Korea. The research used energy-path modeling to examine energy security across economic, environmental, social, technological and military dimensions.

== Notable associates ==
- Simon Tay
