= RMIT School of Economics, Finance and Marketing =

Australian school in Melbourne

School of Economics, Finance and Marketing
- Parent institution: College of Business, Royal Melbourne Institute of Technology
- Head: Professor Timothy Fry
- Location: Melbourne, Vic, Australia; 37°48′29″S 144°57′45″E
- Campus: City
- Website: School of Economics, Finance and Marketing

RMIT's School of Economics, Finance and Marketing is an Australian tertiary education school within the College of Business at the Royal Melbourne Institute of Technology (RMIT University), located in Melbourne, Victoria. As per their website, the research performed at the RMIT's School of Economics, Finance and Marketing has a focus on business behaviour, economics and econometrics, corporate and digital related finances plus their governance, sports and social marketing and consumer culture.

== See also ==
- RMIT University
