= Public Relations Institute of Australia =

- Established: 1949
- Type: Professional association
- Headquarters: Sydney, Australia
- Region served: Australia
- Website: www.pria.com.au

The Public Relations Institute of Australia (PRIA) is a peak body for public relations and communication professionals in Australia. It promotes high ethical standards in the public relations and communication industry through accredited membership, resources, training, and recognition.

PRIA was founded in 1949. It sponsors the open access Asia Pacific Public Relations Journal. The organisation is a member of the Global Alliance for Public Relations and Communication Management.

== Projects ==
In 2014, PRIA projects included advising on lobbyist legislation, increasing the use of valid measurement in PR, and offering career development and professional support resources to practitioners. PRIA also offers member training and professional development, runs a consultancy registration scheme, organises conferences and networking events, and presents annual awards for outstanding programs (the Golden Target Awards).

=== Course accreditations ===
PRIA introduced accreditation of Australian public relations courses in the late 1980s and 1990s. It identifies three core benefits to accreditation:

- committing education providers to aligning with current industry practice
- uniting educators and industry to progress the PR profession
- equipping graduates with best practice skills and competencies

PRIA continues to accredit courses for a five-year rolling period, but the Australian Government has not chartered the association and PRIA does not demand degrees from its members.

== Partnerships and sponsorships ==
When Deakin University began publishing the Asia Pacific Public Relations Journal in 1999, PRIA became a sponsor of the publication, and it continues its support today.

PRIA is one of 25 founding members of the Global Alliance for Public Relations and Communication Management.

In September 2014, PRIA announced a partnership with the International Special Events Society to enable PRIA members to earn professional development points by attending ISES events.

== History ==
When PRIA was established in 1949, Asher Joel was one of its founding members.

PRIA established the annual Golden Target Awards in 1976, to recognise excellence in Australian public relations. The University of Western Sydney's Ward Library is home to the winners collection which dates from 1998.

When the Public Relations Council was formed in 2012, PR practitioners discussed whether Australia's PR industry was big enough for two peak bodies, generally concluding that the market could embrace both organisations.

=== Presidents ===
The following persons have been presidents of PRIA:

- Sylvia Bell (2018-)
- Jennifer Muir (2016–2018)
- Mike Watson (2014–2016)
- Terri-Helen Gaynor (2012–2013)
- Nicholas Turner (2011–2012)
- Robin Xavier (October 2009–2011)
- Tracy Jones (2008–2009)
- Annabelle Warren (2005–2007)
- Rob Masters (2003–2005)
- Liz McLaughlin (2001–2003)
- Jim Macnamara (1999–2001)
- Marjorie Anderson (1992–1993)
- Bill Mackey (1988)
- Hat Myers (1981–1982)
