= Lisa French =

Australian film and television scholar

Lisa French is professor and dean in the School of Media and Communication at RMIT University in Melbourne, Australia. She is the author of The Female Gaze in Documentary Film: An International Perspective , co-author of Shining a Light: 50 Years of the Australian Film Institute and Womenvision: Women and the Moving Image in Australia and the editor of Womenvision: Women and the Moving Image in Australia.

== Career ==
French spent three years as the director of the St Kilda Film Festival and nine years as a non-executive Director of the Australian Film Institute (AFI). She is currently a member of the Federal Government agency Screen Australia's Gender Matters Taskforce. She holds the role of co-chair of a UNESCO global network of 19 universities working on media, gender and ICTs and in that role advocated at the Commission for the Status of Women at the United Nations in New York in 2019, influencing the agenda to increase women's access to media.

French is the dean of the School of Media and Communication at RMIT University in Melbourne. She conducts research on women in film and television. She edited the anthology Womenvision: Women and the Moving Image in Australia (2003) and co-authored Shining a Light: 50 Years of the Australian Film Institute (2009).

She produced the film Birth of a Film Festival (2003), a documentary about the first Melbourne International Film Festival.

== Selected awards and honours ==
- 2005 - Awarded (in recognition of service) a lifetime membership of the Australian Film Institute (AFI)
- 2006 - Granted industry practitioner accreditation (writer/critic category) for the Australian Film Institute AFI Awards (now AACTA Awards)
- 2016 - Invited member: The Australian Academy of Cinema & Television Arts (AACTA) International Chapter
- 2016 - Awarded a lifetime membership of Women in Film & Television (WIFT, Vic.)
