= Sue Ford =

Australian photographer (1943–2009)

- Born: Susanne Helene Winslow; 19 March 1943; St Kilda, Victoria, Australia
- Died: 6 November 2009 (aged 66); Balaclava, Victoria, Australia
- Occupation: Photographer

Susanne Helene Ford (19 March 1943 – 6 November 2009) was an Australian feminist photographer, filmmaker and painter who started her arts practice in the 1960s, and who came to attention in 1971 with her solo exhibition, Metamorphoses Series at the Hawthorn City Art Gallery and at the Yellow House, Sydney.

Ford was the first Australian woman photographer to have a solo exhibition at the National Gallery of Victoria in 1974 with Time Series. A book of her portraits of women A Sixtieth of a Second was published in 1987. Her photographs and eclectic practice was displayed in an exhibition at the National Gallery of Victoria in 2014 where she was also included in the 2025 Women Photographers 1900–1975: A Legacy of Light.

== Biography ==
Sue Ford was born Susanne Helene Winslow on 19 March 1943, in St Kilda, Melbourne. The earliest photographs are from when Ford was first introduced to the camera. Ford was given her first camera in her late teens to take with her on a family holiday to Europe. It was on her return in 1961 that Ford found employment as a delivery girl for Sutcliffe photographers in Melbourne and working as a darkroom assistant. Ford was one of two female to commence photographic studies in the newly established Certificate of Photography course at Royal Melbourne Institute of Technology in 1960, or 1961, but completed only the first year of a three-year course. In 1973 she was awarded an Ilford Scholarship that funded her postgraduate study at the Victorian College of the Arts in Melbourne.

== Professional, documentary, artistic photographer ==
In 1962 Ford rented a studio above a small cafe in Little Collins Street, Melbourne with a friend Annette Stephens, her fellow RMIT student and friend. Ford also documented her children extensively and experimented with concepts for children's books, such as The Witches' Letter, pairing images and text in imaginative narrative sequences that were often connected by a theme of escape. Ennis notes that Ford was unusual for this period in raising her children while engaging in professional and artistic photography.

In the late 1960s Ford created several bodies of work that contained montages, photograms and layered negatives entailing hours of darkroom experimentation. The photo collage Man off the moon, c. 1969 critiqued the first moonwalk by NASA astronauts Neil Armstrong and Buzz Aldrin. Using images shot from a television screen, Ford places her hand into the scene, directing the astronauts like a puppet in a way that asserts her own presence and questions intention of the Americans on the lunar landscape.

Ford made documentary images of herself, her family, friends and acquaintances for social and political ends. Ennis, curator of Ford's first survey show, remarks that she, along with the younger Carol Jerrems, "are now recognised as outstanding portraitists of the period, particularly known for their portraits of women," in which they empowered their subjects in consensual approach and collaborative representation. Ennis gives Ford's picture of her friend drying her hair on the morning of her wedding as an example of "the subject is aware of the photographer...the importance of agreement—indeed, of empathy— [which] is paramount in these works, regardless of the setting.

Her experimentation with technique and media including not only photography but film, video, painting, drawing and later printing was also connected, from the very beginning, by interest in the politics of representation. In 1974, the NGV's display of Time Series 1962–74 constituted its first solo exhibition by a female Australian photographer.

Ford had a continuing interest in Indigenous issues, travelling widely and photographing in remote areas of Central Australia. In 1988, she travelled to Bathurst Island, Northern Territory, to conduct photography workshops with Tiwi women. She moved between Bathurst Island and the Barunga Festival (Northern Territory, Sydney and Melbourne) to photograph events connected to the bicentenary of Australia.

Between 1990 and 1992, Ford's process shifted from direct camera work to a series of collage images. Each collage was gridded up and each section later printed at A3 size to create large format grid images. She also worked with a series of ink and watercolour paintings related to her impression of the Cook Islands, Bathurst Island and the deserts in the Northern Territory. In 1991 Ford bought a house in Marlborough Street, Balaclava, Melbourne where she lived until 2009. She made a second trip to Bathurst Island to work with the Tiwi women in the same year.

In 2011 Ford's last major body of work Self Portrait with a Camera, 1960–2006, was exhibited at Monash Gallery of Art, Melbourne. It involves a conflation and compression of time. It includes some of Ford's earliest photographs alongside her most recent and deeply personal yet ordered and objective at the same time. The earliest photographs in the series are from when Ford was first introduced to the camera.

== Filmmaker ==
Ford was active as a founding member of Reel Women feminist filmmakers. Ford was a member of other feminist film co-operatives over her career, including: the Feminist Film Workers collective (1970s and 1980s) and the Women’s Film Unit in 1985.

== Reception ==
Writing in 1990 Janine Burke considered how Sue Ford's series Time (1981), My Faces (1975) and Boyfriends (1975) evidence change:

The Time series compares the effects of age on the faces of Ford's friends: three shots taken over a number of years are placed in sequence. Love and work, pain and hope, haircuts and wrinkles have made their mark transforming, in some cases quite astonishingly, the features. Abigail's passage from youth to maturity has the quality of a private meditation, from the dreamy young girl to the woman strong with self awareness. Her still, symmetrical head becomes an icon of change and acceptance.

Burke finds in the self-portrait series My Faces a "passionate attention and dispassionate use of image: the photographs tell, in narrative fashion, Ford's psychological history, etched on her face for all to see. They are as honest as one can ever be about oneself," while Boyfriends, she considers a poignant and funny revelation.

== Personal life ==
Ford moved to the Pughs' artists' colony Dunmoochin in Cottles Bridge for a brief period, then to Laughing Waters Road, Eltham with her spouse Gordon Ford. Their first home was destroyed by bushfire, and they then moved to Pitt Street in Eltham and built a mud brick studio there including a darkroom, they also conducted a short lived child portraiture business at the same time as working for Eltham Film Productions.

In 1967 her daughter Emma Ford was born. Then in 1968, her son Ben Ford was born. In 1970, Gordon built a new mud brick house for the family at Laughing Waters Road where they moved in 1972. In 1975 Ford moved to Sydney, but travelled regularly back to Melbourne. In 1980, they returned to Carlton North, Melbourne.

In 1982, Ford suffered a serious horse riding accident that resulted in a back injury and could not photograph for some time so recommenced painting. Living in Williamstown from 1983 to 1985, Victoria. Melbourne. Ford travelled each winter to Byron Bay, in New South Wales, making many friends and working on art projects.

Ford died in 2009 in her Balaclava home on 6 November, surrounded by her family and friends. In 2010, the Sue Ford archive was established.

== Awards and grants ==
- Arts Victoria grant for the continuum series
- Melbourne City Council grant for continuum large-scale digital prints

== Legacy ==
Documentation of Sue Ford's work can be found at the Women's Art Register.

== Selected exhibitions ==
=== Solo ===
- 1969 Suburban Series, collaged photographs
- 1971 Metamorphoses; Hawthorn City Art Gallery, Yellow House, Sydney
- 1974 Time Series 1, National Gallery of Victoria
- 1974 Time Series Brummels Gallery, Melbourne
- 1975, 16 July–16 August: Time Series II, Australian Centre for Photography, Sydney
- 1982 The Photobook of Women, Art Gallery of New South Wales;
- 1982 Christine Abrahams Gallery, Melbourne
- 1984 Watercolours, Watters Gallery, Sydney
- 1988 A Sixtieth of a Second, National Gallery of Victoria; Australian
- 1988, to 15 June: A Sixtieth of a Second-Portraits of Women 1961–1981. Australian Centre for Photography
- 1989 A Different Landscape, Melbourne Contemporary Art Gallery
- 1989 The Witch's Letter, Australian National Gallery, Canberra
- 1994 Time Surfaces: Colour Laser Prints by Sue Ford. National Gallery of Victoria, Melbourne
- 1995 Watter's Gallery Sydney
- 1995 Monash University Gallery, Melbourne
- 1997 Australian Centre for Photography, Sydney
- 1998 Queensland Art Gallery, Brisbane
- 1999 Somewhere in France 1917. Watters Gallery, Sydney
- 1999 Parliament House, Canberra
- 1999 Van Diemans Land to Video Land: An Exhibition of Colour Laser Prints, and Paintings by Sue Ford
- 2003 ARC ONE-Span, Melbourne
- 2004 Watters Gallery, Sydney

=== Selected Group Exhibitions ===
- 1974 Four Photographers, Abraxas Gallery, Canberra
- 1975 Three Women Photographers, Ford with Micky Allan and Virginia Coventry. Ewing and George Paton Gallery, Melbourne
- 1975 Snapshots, Australian Centre for Photography
- 1976 A Survey of Post-Object Art in Australia, Experimental Art Foun-dation, Adelaide
- Three Photographers, Abraxas Gallery; Australian Centre for Photography
- Modern Australian Photographs, National Gallery of Victoria
- 1980 Self-Portrait/Self-Image, Victorian College of the Arts Gallery, Melbourne and touring
- 1981 Ten Years, George Paton Gallery, Melbourne
- 1982 Sydney Biennale: European Dialogue, Art Gallery of New South Wales
- 1983 Continuum 83, Tokyo
- 1983 A Decade of Australian Photography, 1972-1982, Australian National Gallery
- 1987 Living in the Seventies - Australian Photography, Australian National Gallery
- 1987 The Thousand Mile Stare, Victorian Centre for Photography, Melbourne and tour
- 1988 Shades of Light, Photography and Australia, 1839-1988, Australian National Gallery
- 1988 Interventions, The Performance Space, Sydney
- 1993 From the Empire's End: Nine Australian and Spanish Photographers, Bathurst Regional Gallery
- 1994 Pictograms: Aspects of Contemporary Photographic Practice. Touring Exhibition throughout Australia
- 1995 Watter's Gallery, Sydney
- 1995 National Gallery of Australia, Canberra
- 1995 Museum of the Northern Territory, Darwin
- Queensland Art Gallery, Brisbane
- 1998 National Gallery of Victoria, Melbourne
- 1998 Monash University Gallery of Art, Melbourne
- 1999 Institute of Modern Art, Brisbane
- 1999 Heide Museum of Modern Art, Melbourne
- 2000 National Portrait Gallery, Canberra
- 2000 Art Gallery of NSW, Sydney
- 2002 Fieldwork: Australia Art 1968–2002, NGV, Melbourne

=== Posthumous ===
- 2017, 30 September–12 November: An unorthodox flow of images. Curators: Naomi Cass and Pippa Milne, Centre for Contemporary Photography (CCP), Melbourne
- 2025 Women Photographers 1900–1975: A Legacy of Light. NGV, Melbourne
