= Harrison Tsui =

Hong Kong fashion photographer

- Born: Harrison Tsui; 1995 (age 30–31); British Hong Kong
- Known for: Fashion Photographer
- Website: www.harrisontsui.com

Harrison Tsui (born 1995) is a Hong Kong fashion photographer. He is best known for his backstage photography and street style photography work at Ready-to-wear Fashion Weeks.

== Life and career ==
Tsui was born in Hong Kong. He studied graphic design at RMIT University. He began his photography career going to Milan and Paris Fashion Week with his sister Faye Tsui, who is a fashion stylist, in 2015, and started photographing backstage and runway at fashion shows. In 2016, he started collaborating with Harper's Bazaar Singapore, photographing street style, fashion shows' backstage and runway for the magazine.

He has photographed extensively backstage of Dior, Fendi, Prada, Versace, Kenzo, Yohji Yamamoto, Sacai and Max Mara's fashion show.

Apart from his fashion week work, Tsui also photographs fashion stories for different brands and magazines.

His work has been published on American Vogue, WSJ Magazine, Esquire HK, InStyle U.S., Harper's Bazaar Singapore, Harper's Bazaar Hong Kong, Lifestyle Journal, Hong Kong Tatler, MilkX Hong Kong, Hashtag Legend, etc.
