= Peter J. Hayes =

Australian activist

Peter John Hayes (born 1953 in Melbourne) is the Executive Director of the Nautilus Institute for Security and Sustainability, a non-governmental policy-oriented research and advocacy group.

He graduated from the University of Melbourne with a degree in History, and from University of California, Berkeley with a Ph.D. in energy and resources. His PhD was written on non-proliferation regimes in Northeast Asia. He was Professor of International Relations, RMIT University.

Nautilus’ Pegasus Program gives at-risk youth activities about sailing, oceanography, and teamwork on the 45-foot Pegasus research vessel. The Institute runs an information service in Pyongyang.

He was a co-founding member of Friends of the Earth Australia in Melbourne from 1973 to 1975 and First Director of the Environmental Liaison Centre to the United Nations Environment Program established at Nairobi, Kenya, 1975-6.

== Awards ==
- 2000 MacArthur Fellows Program

== Works ==
- American Lake: Nuclear Peril in the Pacific Authors Peter Hayes, Lyuba Zarsky, Walden F. Bello, Penguin Books, 1986 (Penguin, 1987; Asahi Shimbun, 1987)
- Pacific Powderkeg: American Nuclear Dilemmas in Korea University of California, 1989, (Lexington Books, 1991, ISBN 978-0-669-24421-2)
- The Global Greenhouse Regime: Who Pays?, Editors Peter Hayes, Kirk R. Smith, Earthscan, 1993, ISBN 978-1-85383-136-2
- Space Power Interests, Westview Press, 1996, ISBN 978-0-8133-8879-3
- Peace and Security In Northeast Asia and the Nuclear Issue, Editors Young W. Kihl, Peter Hayes, M.E. Sharpe, 1997, ISBN 978-1-56324-789-7
- Chasing gravity's rainbow: Kwajalein and US ballistic missile testing, Authors Owen Wilkes, Megan Van Frank, Peter Hayes, Australian National University, 1991, ISBN 978-0-7315-1239-3
