= RMIT School of Management =

School of Management
- Parent institution: College of Business, Royal Melbourne Institute of Technology
- Dean: Professor Pauline Stanton
- Campus: City
- Website: School of Management

RMIT's School of Management is an Australian tertiary education school within the College of Business at the Royal Melbourne Institute of Technology (RMIT University), located in Melbourne, Victoria.

It is one of the best business schools in Australia, for students' satisfaction, staff-student ration and research and publication from the academic staff members.

== See also ==
- RMIT University
