= Lakshmi Kantam =

Indian scientist

Mannepalli Lakshmi Kantam is an Indian scientist. She is the director of CSIR-IICT and has obtained her PhD degree from Kurukshetra University, Kurukshetra, India under the guidance of Prof. V. Yatirajam in 1982. She joined as a Scientist B in Indian Institute of Chemical Technology, Hyderabad in the year 1984. In 2005, she has been elevated as head of the Inorganic and Physical Chemistry Division, consisting of 30 scientists and 150 PhD students. She has guided 27 PhD students and 15 students are presently working under her guidance for their Ph.D. She has more than 260 research publications and 43 US patents to her credit.

Kantam has made outstanding contributions towards the development of specially designed homogeneous/heterogeneous catalysts for chemical reactions with innovative scientific inputs to achieve highest possible atom economy. In particular, utilization of nanomaterials, hydrotalcites and hydroxyapatites as supports and catalysts for asymmetric catalysis and C-C / C-N coupling reactions is noteworthy.

Development of ligand-free heterogeneous layered double hydroxide supported nanopalladium catalyst using basic LDH in place of basic ligands exhibiting higher activity and selectivity in the Heck olefination chloroarenes is a success story. Asymmetric hydrosilylation of ketones to chiral secondary alcohols with good yields and excellent enantioselectivities using Cu-Al hydrotalcite and BINAP has opened up a new perspective. Innovative design of catalysts for the conversion of waste plastics into oil is another success story.

She has designed and developed recyclable heterogeneous catalysts, copper-exchanged fluorapatite and tert-butoxyapatite by incorporating basic species F-/tBuO- in apatite for N-arylation of imidazoles with chloroarenes and fluoroarenes for the first time. She has also carried out development of phosphine free homogeneous catalysts, palladium(II) complexes of tetradentate dicarboxyamide/dipyridyl ligands for Heck reaction aryl halides, the first report on the use of purely N-donor ligands.

Nanomaterials as catalysts and supports is another area which she has systematically exploited for the advancement of science.

She has received many academic awards viz., Fellow of the National Academy of Sciences, India, 2008, BD Tilak Visiting Fellow, 2008, UICT, Mumbai; AP Akademi Fellow 2006 and RMIT Foundation Fellowship, RMIT university, Melbourne, Australia. She is an adjunct professor at RMIT University, Melbourne, Australia. She is the chairperson, Subject Expert Committee, Women Scientists Scheme, Department of Science and Technology, Government of India. She is a member of several committees, Expert Committee Nano-Agri. Department of Biotechnology, Govt. of India., member, International Advisory Board (CAFC-9), 9th Congress on Catalysis Applied to Fine Chemicals, Spain, 2010; editorial board member, The Chemical Record (TCR), Wiley-VCH; editorial board member, The Open Catalysis Journal; editorial board member, Bulletin of the Catalysis Society of India; president, Catalysis Society of India (CSI); member, Board of Studies, JNTU Hyderabad and Board of Studies, Andhra University, Visakhapatnam; member, selection committee, JNTU Hyderabad.

== Awards ==
2010

- Platinum Jubilee award Lecture, ISC-2010
- Vepachedu Endowment Lecture Award 2010
- CSIR Foundation Day, IICT, Highest external cash flow award- 2010 – All Sources, First Prize, I&PC Division, Project Leader, Best Project Performance filing patents.

2008

- RMIT Foundation Fellowship award, RMIT University, Melbourne, Australia – 2008
- CSIR Foundation Day, IICT, Best performance award for 2008, First Prize, I&PC Division, Project Leader, Best Project Performance Filing Patents.

2006

- CSIR Foundation Day, IICT, Best performance award for 2006, First Prize, I&PC Division, Project Leader, Best Project Performance Filing Patents.

2005

- CSIR Foundation Day, IICT, Best performance award for 2005, First Prize, I&PC Division, Project leader, Best project Performance in filing Patents.

2002

- CSIR Foundation Day, IICT, Best performance award for 2001–2002, First Prize, Homogeneous and Molecular Catalysis, Project leader, Best project performance in filing Patents.

2002

- CSIR Foundation Day, IICT, Best performance award for 2001–2002, First Prize, Homogeneous Catalysis, Inorganics and Allied Chemicals, Project leader, Best overall Performance (ECF, Technology development, Basic research publications and Patents).

2001

- CSIR Foundation Day, IICT, Best performance award for 2000–2001, Second Prize, Homogeneous Catalysis, Inorganics and Allied Chemicals, Project leader, Best overall Performance (ECF, Technology development, Basic research publications and Patents).

2001

- CSIR Foundation Day, IICT, Best performance award for 2000–2001, Homogeneous and Molecular Catalysis, Project leader, Highest ECF Productivity.

2000

- CSIR Foundation Day, IICT, Best performance award for 1999–2000, First Prize, Homogeneous and Molecular Catalysis, Project leader, Highest ECF productivity.

2000

- CSIR Foundation Day, IICT, Best performance award for 1999–2000, First Prize, Homogeneous and Molecular Catalysis, Project leader, Best project Performance in filing Patents.

2000

- CSIR Foundation Day, IICT, Best performance award for 1999–2000, First Prize, Homogeneous and Molecular Catalysis, Project leader, Best project performance in Technology development.

2000

- CSIR Foundation Day, IICT, Best performance award for 1999–2000, First Prize, Homogeneous and Molecular Catalysis, Project leader, Best overall Performance (ECF, Technology Transfer, Patents and Publications).

1999

- CSIR Foundation Day, IICT, Best performance award for 1998–1999, First Prize, Homogeneous and Molecular Catalysis, Project leader, Highest ECF productivity

1999

- CSIR Foundation Day, IICT, Best performance award for 1998–1999, First Prize, Homogeneous and Molecular Catalysis, Project leader, Best overall Performance (ECF, Technology Transfer, Patents and Publications ).

== Honours ==
- 2011 Lifetime Achievement Award, Indian Chemical Society, 2011
- 2010 Plenary Speaker, TOCAT/APCAT, Sapporo, Japan, 2010.
- 2008 Fellow of the National Academy of Sciences, India, 2008
- Joint Director of the IICT-RMIT Research Center. IICT, Hyderabad
- 2008 BD Tilak Visiting Fellow, 2008, UICT, Mumbai.
- 2008 Invited Speaker, ICC14 Pre-Symposium Kyoto 2008, 50th Anniversary of Catalysis Society of Japan, Kyoto, Japan, 2008.
- 2007 Invited Speaker, Indo-China Symposium on Designing Materials through Nano-technology, Beijing, China, 2007.
- 2006 AP Akademi Fellow 2006.
- 2005 Invited Speaker, Indo-Japan workshop on principle and catalysis application of Nonmaterials decorated surfaces, Tokyo, Japan, 2005.
- 2005 Invited Speaker, Givaudan, Zurich, Switzerland, 2005.
- 1996 JSPS Visiting Scientist, Kyoto University, Kyoto, Japan, 1995 -1996.
- Chairperson, Subject Expert Committee, Women Scientists Scheme, Department of Science and Technology, Government of India.
- Member, Expert Committee Nano-Agri. Department of Biotechnology, Govt. of India.
- 2010 member, international advisory board,(CAFC-9), 9th Congress on Catalysis Applied to Fine Chemicals, Spain, 2, editorial board member, The Chemical Record (TCR), Wiley-VCH
- Editorial board member, The Open Catalysis Journal.
- Editorial board member, Bulletin of the Catalysis Society of India.
- President, Catalysis Society of India (CSI).
- Member, Board of Studies, JNTU Hyderabad.
- Member, selection committee, JNTU Hyderabad.

== See also ==
- Indian Institute of Chemical Technology
