= RMIT School of Creative Media =

Coordinates: 37°48′28″S 144°57′48″E

- Parent institution: College of Design and Social Context, Royal Melbourne Institute of Technology
- Campus: RMIT Melbourne City
- Website: www.rmit.edu.au/creativemedia (archived)

The RMIT School of Creative Media was an Australian tertiary education school in the College of Design and Social Context (DSC) of RMIT University. The school hosted RMIT's animation, audio visual, creative writing, filmmaking, music, multimedia, photography and video games programs. It merged with the School of Applied Communication on 6 July 2009 to form the RMIT School of Media and Communication.

== Location ==
The school was located in Building 94 on Cardigan Street in the "Carlton Precinct" of the RMIT Melbourne City campus, at the northern end of the Melbourne central business district.

== Centre for Animation and Interactive Media ==
The Centre for Animation and Interactive Media (AIM) is the school's postgraduate studio and production centre. It's respected both in Australia and internationally, and developed its reputation during the 1990s. AIM productions are regularly presented at international festivals, including the Cannes Film Festival, and have won awards worldwide.

== Field 36 Gallery ==
The Field 36 is the RMIT School of Creative Media's exclusive gallery. The gallery has the capacity for media and electronic arts, and hosts exhibition by RMIT student and alumni as well as leading artists whose work mirrors the direction of the school. It is located in Building 36 on Swanston Street at the RMIT Melbourne City campus.

== Journals ==
Second Nature: The International Journal of Creative Media is an open access, peer-reviewed online journal that was auspiced in Australia by the RMIT School of Creative Media. Second Nature explores the distinctive particulars of and interconnections between textual, visual, aural and interactive creative research and practices.
