= Reel Women =

Filmmaking organisation in Austin, Texas

Reel Women Media is a filmmaking non-profit organization in Austin, Texas, USA, that provides support to women in the film industry.

== Background and history ==
Ally Acker used the term "Reel Women" in 1984 for her book Reel Women: Pioneers of the Cinema, 1896 to Present and documentary series. This was the first production in the market that revealed the transformative roles women had within the film industry that were not as widely recognized by prior film history studies. The term had previously been used by a group of women filmmakers in Melbourne, Australia, in the 1970s.

Reel Women began in 1995 as a collective of women media-makers who were helping each other out on film projects. From there it grew into an organization of about 700 people, both men and women, young and old, anywhere from amateur to professional. Reel Women serves as a resource to the film community over the years by planning guest speakers, workshops, mixers, and screening events. Its members worked with other non-profit organizations in Austin, including the Austin Film Society, The Austin Creative Alliance, Austin Film Meet, Picturebox Productions, and SXSW Film Festival.

Reel Women has taken part directly in filmmaking by organizing film shoots and planning filming projects, as well as making their own educational films and books. These include the Filmmakers on Film 10-Disc DVD set and Ally Acker's films Reel Herstory with Jodie Foster (2014) and Flowering Little Crone, as well as the books Reel Women: Pioneers of the Cinema, The First Hundred Years, Volume 1 and Volume 2.

Reel Women was the local sponsor for the 48 Hour Film Project, a competition created in 2001 to make the best short film in only 48 hours using predetermined elements.

Reel Women organized LUNAFEST, a traveling film festival with films for, about and by women. Reel Women also organized the Austin Film Industry Holiday party in December that served as its yearly fundraising event.

== Description and functions ==
The Reel Women in Film Collection, housed at the Academy Film Archive, collects interviews with many prominent women in the film industry past and present.

As of 2016, Reel Women is a full service facility that provides pro bono editing services to clients with educational projects. Their current clientele include NBC's Today Show, ABC's Good Morning America, National Geographic's Explorer, Lifetime, and Disney.
