= Bob Isherwood =

Australian businessman

- Born: Melbourne, Australia
- Education: RMIT

Bob Isherwood is an Australian businessman, global advertising creative leader, and the co-founder of ONE School.

== Education ==
Isherwood attended RMIT to study Advertising Art, thanks to the intervention of Victor Greenhalgh – the head of department. Isherwood established the Victor Greenhalgh scholarship programme for underprivileged students at RMIT.

He is also a member of RMIT’s Acclaimed Alumni, and received the first ever Honorary Doctorate in Communications from RMIT in 2007.

== Career ==
Bob Isherwood has had a career spanning over three decades and three continents.

He worked for six years as a creative group head for Young & Rubicam London and 10 years with Collet Dickenson Pearce & Partners before moving back to Australia in 1982 to become a founding partner of Campaign Palace Sydney.

Isherwood joined Saatchi & Saatchi in 1986, where he spent 22 years, including 11 years as the agency’s Worldwide Creative Director, and served as chair of its Worldwide Creative Board. Under his leadership, Saatchi & Saatchi’s global network of 143 offices in 83 countries consistently ranked among the top creative agencies in the world, winning more than 8,000 major awards – including becoming the #1 creative network at the 2002 Cannes Lions Festival – for clients such as P&G and Toyota, for whom Bob served as creative director for the global launch of Toyota Prius.

Isherwood, along with Richard Meyers, were tasked with taking over The Saatchi & Saatchi New Directors Showcase after its first year. It has grown to become the most anticipated premiere at the Cannes Lions Festival. Now in its 34th year, it has been rebranded as the Saatchi & Saatchi New Creators' Showcase.

Isherwood left Saatchi & Saatchi in 2008, citing a need to "have more than one life in my lifetime."

From 2010-2016, Bob Isherwood was adjunct faculty at Vanderbilt University, teaching two Creative Advertising courses.

In 2011, Isherwood became a founding partner of Dialog Health, a two-way mobile messaging company created to improve patient satisfaction, compliance, and adherence, in healthcare.

Bob Isherwood was named the Dean of the Cannes Young Lions Creative Academy in 2012, and served as its Dean until 2020.

Isherwood joined Innocean as Worldwide Creative Advisor and in charge of the newly formed Global Creative Council in 2013.

In February 2020, Isherwood was appointed Head of Creative Development at The One Club for Creativity, and in fall of 2021 he co-founded ONE School, a free online portfolio program for black creatives with schools based in New York, Los Angeles, Chicago, Atlanta and the UK.

== Creative Accolades ==
Isherwood won Australia’s first Gold Lion award for Cinema at the Cannes International Advertising Festival. He was also the first Australian to win a D&AD Black Pencil (gold award) for Advertising.

He was named Australia’s Leading Creative Director and received the Clio Lifetime Achievement Award. and has been inducted into the Clio Hall of Fame.

He was inducted into the Australian Writers and Art Directors Hall of Fame in August 2009.

In 2024, Isherwood was inducted into the Creative Hall of Fame.

== Appointments ==
- President, Film & Press & Poster Juries at Cannes International Festival of Creativity
- Chairman of Executive TV & Radio Jury, Clio awards
- Participant in ‘2020’ initiative of Australian Prime Minister, Kevin Rudd.
- Selection Panel Member, Advance Global Australian Awards 2012-2014.
- Dean of the Cannes Young Creative Academy,
- Adjunct Professor of Managerial Studies at Vanderbilt University.

== Bibliography ==
- ‘World Changing Ideas’ – (co-authored with Richard Myers.)

Palazzo Editions ISBN 0-9553046-0-1 ISBN 978-0-9553046-0-6

- ‘Art Direction (D&AD Mastercraft Series)’ – (essay by Isherwood)

Rotovision ISBN 0-8230-6562-6 ISBN 978-0-8230-6562-2

- ‘Advertising Now. Print.’ (succinct essay by Isherwood)

(editor Julius Wiedemann.) Taschen – GmbH ISBN 3-8228-4027-0 ISBN 978-3-8228-4027-6

- ‘Advertising Now.’ TV Commercials: (essay by Isherwood)

Taschen – GmbH Not Yet Available

- ‘Social Work: Saatchi & Saatchi’s Cause Related Ideas.’

Te Neues Publishing Co. ISBN 0-9538128-0-4 ISBN 978-0-9538128-0-6

- ‘The 22 Irrefutable Laws of Advertising (and When to Violate Them)’

(by Michael Newman, foreword by Isherwood.) Published by Wiley ISBN 0-470-82106-X ISBN 978-0-470-82106-0
