= Lauren Berkowitz =

Australian artist

- Born: 1965 (age 60–61)
- Education: School of Visual Arts

Lauren Berkowitz (born 1965) is an Australian artist who lives and works in Melbourne. Her work is in the collections of the National Gallery of Australia and the Art Gallery of New South Wales.

Her work was shown at the Museum of Contemporary Art, Sydney in 2010 and 2021, and the National Gallery of Victoria, Melbourne, in 2014.

== Selected group exhibitions ==
- 2021 The National 2021: New Australian Art, Museum of Contemporary Art Australia, Sydney
- 2019 Ecosphere, MPavillion, Monash University Clayton Campus, Melbourne
- 2019 Fragile Ecologies, Kronenberg, Mais Wright Gallery, Sydney
- 2018 Plastic Topographies, Artspace Ideas Platform, Sydney
- 2018 International Studio & Curatorial Program Open Studios, Brooklyn, NY, USA
- 2016–2017 Human/Animal/Artist, McClelland Gallery, Victoria, Australia

== Collections ==
- National Gallery of Australia
- Art Gallery of New South Wales
