= Allan Briggs (businessman) =

Australian businessman

Allan Briggs is a Melbourne-based crisis communication expert. He is the chief executive officer of Crisis Shield (formerly Briggs Communications) and a sessional lecturer at RMIT University.

Originally from country Victoria, Allan's career began at Victoria Police. He served as an operational police officer for 16 years rising to the rank of Sergeant. Allan spent ten years in the Victoria Police Media and Corporate Communications Department, four of which spent managing the Public Relations Unit. Prior to starting his own communications company, Allan headed the Media and Public Relations Unit at State Emergency Services.

Allan has managed the media for a number of high profile crises and emergencies such as the Melbourne gangland killings, the Black Saturday bushfires and the Kerrang train collision.

== Crisis Shield ==
In 2010, Allan founded Briggs Communications, which specialises in crisis communication and has clients across the emergency services, government, corporate and not-for-profit sectors.

In 2017, Briggs Communications was renamed to Crisis Shield to represent Crisis Shield’s broadening specialties in both crisis communications and crisis management.

Crisis Shield specialises in developing crisis communication and emergency management strategies for organisations and testing their plans accordingly. Several media outlets including The Herald Sun, The Age, and The Nine and Seven Networks recently covered a University of Melbourne crisis training exercise facilitated by Crisis Shield.

Allan continues to work in the university sector as a lecturer. He frequently speaks at conferences around Australia and also runs regular short courses such as crisis management, media training and strategic planning.

== Notable engagements ==
- Crisis management webinar for the petroleum exploration society of Great Britain. - Scott. J interview - Host of 360 crisis management masterclass for Business - 2019 Nominee for the Governor of Victoria Export Awards - Speaker at EEAA 2019 Leaders Forum &Conference - Guest speaker at EG VTIC - Victoria Tourism Industry Council (VTIC) – training on COVID - Local Government Association – training on crisis/COVID
