= Julian de Stoop =

Australian journalist

Julian de Stoop (born December 1980 in Melbourne) is an Australian journalist.

De Stoop began his journalism career in 2002 with Inside Football magazine after completing a Bachelor of Arts at RMIT University.

He joined the Nine Network for National Nine News in 2004, as a sports reporter, covering such sports as Australian rules football and cricket.

In November 2006 de Stoop switched to Fox Sports News to jointly head its Melbourne bureau where he is Chief Football Reporter.

Julian de Stoop is a supporter of the Essendon Football Club.
