= Megan Spencer =

Megan Spencer (born 1966) is an Australian broadcaster, film critic, journalist, media maker, and teacher.

== Biography ==
Spencer studied Speech pathology in Melbourne before pursuing interests in film and radio. In the 1980s, as a volunteer, she co-produced 'Eeek!' a 3RRR cultural theory radio show, hosted by Philip Brophy and Bruce Milne. She later studied Media Arts at RMIT University and completed her first documentary film: Heathens in 1994.

Spencer has been a guest speaker at various film events around Australia. She has broadcast regularly on ABC Radio National, Sydney and Melbourne metro ABC radio, and regional ABC radio. She has worked as a film programmer (RMIT, VCA, Kingston Arts Centre), and taught documentary and film theory and practice (Melbourne University, VCA, RMIT, AFTRS Melbourne). She has written for publications IF Magazine, Real Time, documenter, The Eye and Like.

From 1996 to 1998 Spencer co-founded, programmed and ran the VCA Documentary Film Society at the Victorian College of the Arts. In 1999 she joined ABC Radio's Triple J national youth network as resident film critic and journalist. In 2002 she co-founded Triple J's annual Framebreaks National Youth Short Film Festival, and was a member of the MIFF Film Critic's Jury. In 2004 she completed her MA in Media Arts (Documentary) at RMIT University, and from 2004 to 2006 was a film critic on SBS Television's The Movie Show. In 2007 Spencer was the Guest Director of the Revelation Perth International Film Festival, and in 2008 became a radio presenter on 105.7 ABC Darwin. She lived in Berlin in 2009–2010, then moved to Bendigo, and in 2013 was a radio presenter for ABC Central Victoria.

Spencer has been a judge for film festivals and competitions across Australia, including Sydney Film Festival, Shoot Out, St. Kilda Film Festival, Brisbane International Film Festival, Melbourne International, Underground and Fringe Film Festivals, Real Life on Film Documentary Festival, Queensland's Pandanus Film Festival, the SA Zoom Fest, Melbourne International Queer Film Festival, SPAA Fringe and the annual AFI Awards.

She is also a teacher of meditation.

== Filmography ==
- Heathens, 1994
- Hooked on Christmas, 1997
- Strange Hungers, 2002
- Lovestruck: Wrestling's No. #1 Fan, 2005
- Brent
- The Band, 2009
