= Nick Johnston (journalist) =

Nick Johnston is an Australian communications specialist based in Melbourne, Victoria.

After completing a Bachelor of Arts (Journalism) at RMIT, Johnston worked at The Age both in Melbourne and in Canberra, and at the ABC where he held the position of state political reporter for three years. In March 2003, he joined the Nine Network and reported on the Commonwealth Games as well as the 2006 Victorian state election. In 2007 he was a finalist in the United Nations Association of Australia Media Peace Awards Best News story category.

In 2009, Johnston resigned from Nine News, and joined the Australian Football League as Public Affairs Manager. In 2011, he moved to Sydney to become the General Manager of Corporate Affairs and Communications for the Greater Western Sydney Giants. In 2015, he joined the V8 Supercars as the General Manager PR and Communications, before moving to the National Basketball League as General Manager Media and Communications in 2017. He remains in this position.

He lives in Melbourne with his partner and two children.
