= Annette Gough =

Australian academic

Annette Elizabeth Gough OAM (born 1950) is an Australian science and environmental education scholar and Professor Emerita in the School of Education at Royal Melbourne Institute of Technology in Australia. She is a pioneer of the environmental education movement in Australia. Gough is known for her critical analysis of the history of the field and for introducing a gender dimension in environmental education research. Although best known for this work, Gough has also made important contributions to science education, research methodology and gender studies.

== Early life and education ==
Gough was born in Melbourne, Victoria, where she completed a BSc in Education and a Master of Education at the University of Melbourne. Gough joined the Australian Government’s Curriculum Development Centre in 1974 to work on the dissemination of the Australian Science Education Project. She transitioned to working on the development of the new field of environmental education which she documented in her Master of Education thesis, Environmental Education in Australia: Phenomenon of the Seventies – A Case Study in National Curriculum Action.

At the Curriculum Development Centre Gough took on coordination of the national environmental education program (1976–1981), which was the origins of the Australian Association for Environmental Education (AAEE). In 1984 Gough was appointed as president of the AAEE. When the Curriculum Development Centre was disbanded in 1982 Gough took up the position of Director of Environmental Education in the Australian Department of Home Affairs and Environment (1983–1987). While with the Department, Gough led the Australian delegation to the UNESCO–UNEP International Congress on Environmental Education and Training.

== Career as an academic ==
Gough was appointed as a lecturer in science and environmental education in the Faculty of Education at Deakin University in May 1990. While at Deakin she completed her PhD and made significant contributions to the field through her roles as managing editor of the Australian Journal of Environmental Education (1998–2002), and other organisations. These contributions were recognised by the Australian Association for Environmental Education making her a life fellow in 1992.

In 2005, Gough was appointed as Dean of the School of Education at RMIT University, a position she held until 2013. Since that time, she has engaged in a range of roles within the University and was appointed Professor Emerita in 2015, retiring in 2020.

While Dean, Gough co-authored Australia’s second national statement on environmental education for schools for the Curriculum Corporation and the Australian Department of Arts and Heritage, after having written the first national statement in 1980.

In 2023 she was awarded an Order of Australia Medal for her services to tertiary education and environmental education.

== Professional works ==
Gough has been involved in writing curriculum materials and educational resources for teachers for much of her career. These include two editions of the textbook for the Victorian senior secondary Outdoor and Environmental Studies subject.

Her major research monograph provides a broad appreciation of the emergence of environmental education as 'a history' of the field. Gough elaborates upon the early formation of the central associated issues, examining the processes that have moved towards international and national consensus. It is this background that positions the significance of her research as an imperative beyond the 1990's [and] questions the domination of Anglo-American English speaking hegemony and the androcentric paradigms which have driven the agenda in environmental education to date”.

Her advocacy for a feminist perspective in environmental education started with her doctoral research and continues. During the 2000s she has also pursued research into cyborg/posthuman/more-than human studies as they relate to environmental and science education

== Other activities ==
From 2006 to 2021 Gough was a Managing Trustee for the King and Amy O’Malley Trust and Chair of the Scholarship Advisory Committee from 2010–2021.

== Selecte publications ==
=== Articles ===
- Gough, A. (2002). Mutualism: a different agenda for science and environmental education. International Journal of Science Education, 24(11), 1201-1215.
- Gough, A. (2008). Towards more effective learning for sustainability: reconceptualising science education. Transnational Curriculum Inquiry, 5(1), 32-50.
- Gough, A. (2011). The Australian-ness of Government Action in Environmental Education. Australian Journal of Environmental Education, 27(1), 1-15.
- Gough, A., & Whitehouse, H. (2019). Centering gender on the agenda for environmental education research, The Journal of Environmental Education, 50 (4-6), 332-347.
- Gough, A. (2020). Symbiopolitics, sustainability and science studies: How to engage with alien oceans. Cultural Studies ↔ Critical Methodologies, 20(3), 272–282.

=== Chapters ===
- Gough, A. (2015). Resisting becoming a Glomus Body within Posthuman Theorizing: Mondialisation and Embodied Agency in Educational Research. In N. Snaza & J. Weaver (Eds). Posthumanism and Educational Research (pp. 254-275). New York: Routledge.
- Gough, A. (2016a). Tensions around the teaching of environmental sustainability in schools. In T. Barkatsas & A. Bertram (Eds.), Global Learning in the 21st Century (pp. 83-102). Sense Publishers.
- Gough, A. (2018). Sustainable Development and Global Citizenship Education: Challenging Imperatives. In I. Davies, L-C. Ho, D. Kiwan, C. Peck, A. Peterson, E. Sant, & Y. Waghid (Eds.). The Palgrave Handbook of Global Citizenship and Education (pp. 295-312). Palgrave.
- Gough, A. (2020). Environmental/sustainability education in a global context: A story of political and disciplinary resistances. In J.C.K. Lee & N. Gough (Eds.), Transnational education and curriculum studies: International perspectives (pp. 99-113). Routledge.
- Gough, A. (2021). Intersectionality and assemblages at the margins: Towards posthuman environmental education. In J. Russell (Ed.), Queer Ecopedagogies: Explorations in Nature, Sexuality, and Education (pp. 161-181). Springer.
