= RMIT School of Mathematical and Geospatial Sciences =

The RMIT School of Mathematical and Geospatial Science was an Australian tertiary education school located within the College of Science Engineering and Health of RMIT University. Since September 2016 the former school has become part of the new RMIT School of Science. Both Mathematical Sciences and Geospatial Science have transitioned into two of the seven distinct disciplines that make up the RMIT School of Science. The last Head of School was Professor John Hearne.

== Centre for Risk and Community Safety ==
The School includes the centre for and Community Safety which is a collaboration between the Geospatial Science school, Emergency Management Australia and the Australian National University. It is an internationally recognised research department which aims to identify the research needs of emergency management in Australia and publicize the needs as well as undertake research to satisfy them. This centre is also affiliated with the Australian Bushfire Cooperative Research Centre (Bushfire CRC). The Bushfire CRC at RMIT is working on Methodology Development for Economic Assessment of Bushfire Costs' and 'Evaluation of Current "Stay or Go" Policy and its Implementation in Bushfire Response'. These both are elements of the Bushfire CRC "Program C" that is focusing on Community Self Sufficiency for fire safety.

== Access Grid Room ==
The Mathematics section of the School includes an "Access Grid Room" this is a room equipped with two way interactive telecommunications including Smart Boards, data projectors and large multimedia displays. It was built in collaboration with the International Centre for Education in Mathematics (ICE-EM) and the room is connected to the worldwide Access Grid.

== International Collaboration ==
Students and Lecturers from the School regularly collaborate with International Organizations and Universities as part of the courses. Recent Collaborations have included the University of the South Pacific and RMIT Vietnam as well as Canada, China, The Netherlands and South Africa

== History ==
=== Geospatial Science ===
Mr. Carl S. Honman founded Geospatial Sciences at RMIT and ran Land Surveying Courses in the 1930s as part of Civil Engineering Courses. After his secondment to the Australian Government due to the First World War various lecturers took over the courses until Mr. Love was appointed in September 1949. It was Mr. Love who set up a surveying course that met the requirements of the Victorian Board of Surveying requirements. Over time the size and scope of the school has expanded and in 1978 RMIT University was able to award degrees and the school had degrees in surveying, Cartography and Town Planning. The Department of Surveying became the Department of Land Information in 1987 and was renamed again in the 1990s to the Department of Geospatial Science and in the 2000s was merged with the Department of Mathematics to form the Department of Mathematical and Geospatial Sciences seen today.

== See also ==
- RMIT University
- Emergency Management Australia
- Access Grid
- Kathryn Sheffield, remote sensing
