= RMIT School of Accounting =

Coordinates: 37°48′28″S 144°57′48″E

- School of Accounting
- Former names: Department of Commerce, School of Accountancy
- Type: Business school
- Established: 1943
- Affiliation: RMIT University
- Dean: Garry Carnegie
- Location: Melbourne, Victoria, Australia
- Website: School of Accounting

The RMIT School of Accounting is an Australian university business school located in Melbourne, Victoria, which is responsible for undergraduate and postgraduate education and research in accounting at RMIT University. The School was established in 1943 and its name was changed to the School of Accountancy (later Accounting) in 1948.

== History ==
The first accountancy classes at RMIT were taught by A. G. Robinson, an accountant in private practice, who had conducted evening classes at his offices since the early 1930s to prepare students for the examinations of the various accountancy institutes of the time (predecessors to the Australian Society of Accountants; now CPA Australia). In 1934, Robinson approached the President of the Melbourne Technical College (as RMIT was then known), Frank Ellis, to transfer his existing classes to the college. Robinson began teaching classes at the college in March 1935 and by the end of 1936 had graduated over 40 qualified accountants.

Following an objection to this arrangement by the Victorian Department of Education in 1941, E. J. Edwards was then placed in charge of teaching accountancy at the college. Edwards established a Department of Commerce in 1943, which was advertising classes in managerial and industrial organisation and accountancy by September that year. A four-year diploma course in accountancy was developed in 1944, which admitted graduates to the Commonwealth Institute of Accountants, and was administered by the college and the institute. The department's name was changed to the School of Accountancy in 1948 due to the majority of it studies being in that field.

During this time the department grew rapidly and, by 1948, had an enrolment of 1525 students in its accountancy diploma as well as its preparatory classes for the examinations of the Bankers' Institute of Australasia, Chartered Institute of Secretaries, Companies Auditors' Board and Municipal Auditors' Board. In 1952, the various accountancy institutes of the time, including the Commonwealth Institute of Accountants, amalgamated to form the Australian Society of Accountants and introduced a new joint examiner's board at the School which later served as a model for other schools in Victoria as well as other states of Australia.

In 1950, the School was approached by the Real Estate and Stock Institute of Victoria (now REIV) to develop a certificate course in real estate management and valuation and, by 1954, nearly all training for land valuers in Victoria was being conducted by the School. In 1954, the School was approached by the Institute of Public Administration to develop a certificate course in public administration which was later expanded to a diploma in 1956. Both of these courses would later break away from the School of Accounting to form the predecessors to RMIT's School of Global, Urban and Social Studies and School of Property, Construction and Project Management.

== Courses and programs ==
RMIT began to accredit its own courses in the School of Accounting after the Australian Society of Accountants abandoned its policy of staged examination, in favour of admitting graduates from appropriate degrees and diplomas, in the 1960s—like other professional societies of the time in Australia.

The School offers bachelor's and master's degree courses in accounting and financial services programs and a Doctorate of Philosophy in accounting. In 2016, the School was ranked among the top 100 in the world for accounting and finance subjects in the QS World University Rankings.

== Conferences ==
The School of Accounting hosts two annual conferences: the RMIT Accounting for Sustainability Conference in May and RMIT Accounting Educators Conference in November.

== See also ==
- RMIT University
- RMIT School of Global, Urban and Social Studies
- RMIT School of Property, Construction and Project Management
