= RMIT School of Engineering =

School of the Royal Melbourne Institute of Technology

School of Engineering
- Parent institution: RMIT University College of Science, Engineering and Health
- Executive Dean: Professor Ray Kirby
- Campus: City, Bundoora
- Website: School of Engineering

The RMIT School of Engineering is an Australian tertiary education school within the College of Science Engineering and Health of RMIT University. It was created in 2016 from the former schools of Aerospace, Mechanical and Manufacturing Engineering, the School of Civil, Environmental and Chemical Engineering, and the School of Electrical and Computer Engineering.

== See also ==
- RMIT University
