= School of Architecture and Design =

School of Architecture and Design may refer to:

- School of Architecture and Design, King Mongkut's University of Technology Thonburi
- Oslo School of Architecture and Design
- RMIT School of Architecture and Design
