= RMIT School of Science =

Tertiary education

School of Science
- Parent institution: RMIT University College of Science, Engineering and Health
- Executive Dean: Russell Crawford
- Campus: City, Bundoora
- Website: School of Science

The RMIT (Royal Melbourne Institute of Technology) School of Science is an Australian tertiary education school within the College of Science Engineering and Health of RMIT University. It was created in 2016 from the former schools of Applied Sciences, Computer Science and Information Technology, and Mathematical and Geospatial Sciences.

== See also ==
- RMIT University
