= RMIT School of Health and Biomedical Sciences =

School of Health and Biomedical Sciences
- University coat of arms
- Type: Private
- Established: 2016; 10 years ago (restructure)
- Parent institution: Royal Melbourne Institute of Technology
- Executive Dean: Professor Catherine Itsiopoulos
- Location: Melbourne, Victoria, Australia
- Campus: City campus, Bundoora campus
- Website: School of Health and Biomedical Sciences

The RMIT School of Health and Biomedical Sciences is the tertiary school of the Royal Melbourne Institute of Technology for allied health, applied health and biomedicine. It is within the College of Science, Engineering and Health (STEM College). The school was formed in 2016 from the amalgamation of the schools of Health Sciences, Life and Physical Sciences and Medical Sciences.

== See also ==
- RMIT University
