= Two-way communication =

Form of transmission in which both parties involved transmit information

Two-way communication is a form of transmission in which both parties involved transmit information. Two-way communication has also been referred to as interpersonal communication. Common forms of two-way communication are:

- Amateur radio, CB or FRS radio contacts.
- Chatrooms and instant messaging.
- Computer networks. See backchannel.
- In-person communication.
- Telephone conversations.

A cycle of communication and two-way communication are actually two different things. If we examine closely the anatomy of communication – the actual structure and parts – we will discover that a cycle of communication is not a two-way communication in its entirety. Meaning, two way communication is not as simple as one may infer. One can improve two-way or interpersonal communication by focusing on the eyes of the person speaking, making eye contact, watching body language, responding appropriately with comments, questions, and paraphrasing, and summarizing to confirm main points and an accurate understanding.

Two-way communication is different from one-way communication in that two-way communication occurs when the receiver provides feedback to the sender. One-way communication is when a message flows from sender to receiver only, thus providing no feedback. Some examples of one-way communication are radio or television programs and listening to policy statements from top executives. Two-way communication is especially significant in that it enables feedback to improve a situation.

Two-way communication involves feedback from the receiver to the sender. This allows the sender to know the message was received accurately by the receiver. One person is the sender, which means they send a message to another person via face to face, email, telephone, etc. The other person is the receiver, which means they are the one getting the senders message. Once receiving the message, the receiver sends a response back. For example, Person A sends an email to Person B --> Person B responds with their own email back to Person A. The cycle then continues. This chart demonstrates two-way communication and feedback.

                       [Sender] ←-------
                          |                 \
                     [Encoding]               \
                          |                    |
                      [Channel]         [Feedback]
                          |                    |
                     [Decoding]               /
                          |                 /
                     [Receiver]---------->

Two-way communication may occur horizontally or vertically in the organization. When information is exchanged between superior and subordinate, it is known as vertical two-way communication. On the other hand, when communication takes place between persons holding the same rank or position, it is called horizontal two-way communication. Two-way communication is represented in the following diagrams:

                    (Superior)---------------> (Subordinate)---------------> (Superior)
                               (Information)                  (Feedback)

There are many different types of two-way communication systems, and choosing which is best to use depends on things like the intended use, the location, the number of users, the frequency band, and the cost of the system. “Regardless of the type of system chosen, the one common feature is that all of the components must be compatible and work together to support a common purpose.”

== Amateur radio, citizen band radio, and Family Radio Service ==
Amateur radio is used for entertainment and as a hobby by many groups of people. These individuals label themselves as “hams”. Amateur radios are also known to be a reliable means of communication when all other forms are not operating. In times of disaster, communication through Amateur radios has led to lives being saved. Citizens band radio (CB radio) can be used by anyone who is not a member of a foreign government. It is meant for short-range communication using devices that mimic walkie-talkies. Family Radio Service (FRS) is also meant for short-range communication using devices that mimic walkie-talkies. Like the CB radio, the FRS does not require a license and can be used by anyone who is not a member of a foreign government.

== Chat rooms and instant messaging ==
Instant messaging became wildly popular around 1996 and spread even more with AOL in 1997. The concept behind IM is that it enables quick communication between two people using tools such as knowing when messages are seen or knowing when others are online. Many social media sites have integrated IM into their sites as ways to spread communication. Many social media sites have direct message or Private message. Called either PM or DM, where you can privately text one another from your social media account. Much different from Chat rooms. Chat rooms are messages to a group of people. Chat rooms are often public, meaning that you are able to send a message and anyone can freely join the “room” and view the message as well as respond.

== In-person communication ==
As it relates to business, 75% of people believe in-person communication is critical. In-person interaction is useful for resolving problems more efficiently, generating long-term relationships, and resolving a problem or creating an opportunity quickly. 4 out of 6 of the most important attributes of building a relationship cannot be achieved without the power of in-person, which requires a rich communication environment. Business executives believe in-person collaboration is critical for more than 50 percent of key business strategic and tactical business processes when engaging with colleagues, customers, or partners.

== Telephone conversations ==
Telephones have gone under many changes throughout the years. For example, today's telephones use electronic switches instead of operators. The switch uses a dial tone so that when one picks up the phone you are aware that both the switch and the phone are functioning properly.

Land-line telephones have gradually seen decreasing commonality and usage, owing to the increasing ubiquity of personal smart phones globally obviating the need to use dedicated phones to maintain telephone communications. Another major change is that most people now use their mobile devices to make calls and communicate with others instead of landline telephones.

== Computer networks ==
Computer networks are used to have two-way communication by having computers exchange data. Ways that this is possible is wired interconnects and wireless interconnects. Types of wired interconnects are Ethernets and fiber optic cables. Ethernets connect local devices through Ethernet cables. Fiber runs underground for long distances and is the main source of Internet in most homes and businesses. Types of wireless interconnects include Wi-Fi and Bluetooth. The problem with these networks is that they don't have unlimited connection span. To expand the reach there are wide area interconnects such as satellite and cellular networks. Also, there are long-distance interconnects which need backhaul to move the data back and forth and last mile to connect the provider to the network.
