= RMIT School of Art =

Art school in Melbourne, Australia

Coordinates: 37°48′28″S 144°57′48″E

- School of Art
- Former name: School of Applied Art
- Type: art school
- Established: 1917
- Affiliations: RMIT University
- Dean: Professor Kit Wise
- Location: Melbourne, Victoria, Australia
- Website: School of Art

The RMIT School of Art is an Australian university art school located in Melbourne, Victoria, which is responsible for undergraduate and postgraduate education and research in fine art and photography at RMIT University. Established in 1917, it is the top art school in Australia and 11th in the world, according to the 2020 QS World University Rankings.

== History ==
Art education has been offered at RMIT since its foundation in 1887 (as the Working Men's College), as part of a suite of "art, science and technological" classes envisioned by its founder Francis Ormond. The early art classes of the College were modelled on those of British and European art schools—particularly the Brighton College of Art (now the University of Brighton) and the South Kensington Science and Art School (now the Royal College of Art) in the United Kingdom.

By 1899, around 400 students were taking classes in architectural and freehand drawing, painting, sculpture and wood-carving at the College. Its architectural classes were the first in Victoria, and remained part of the School of Art until 1934 when they broke away to form the predecessor to the RMIT School of Architecture and Design.

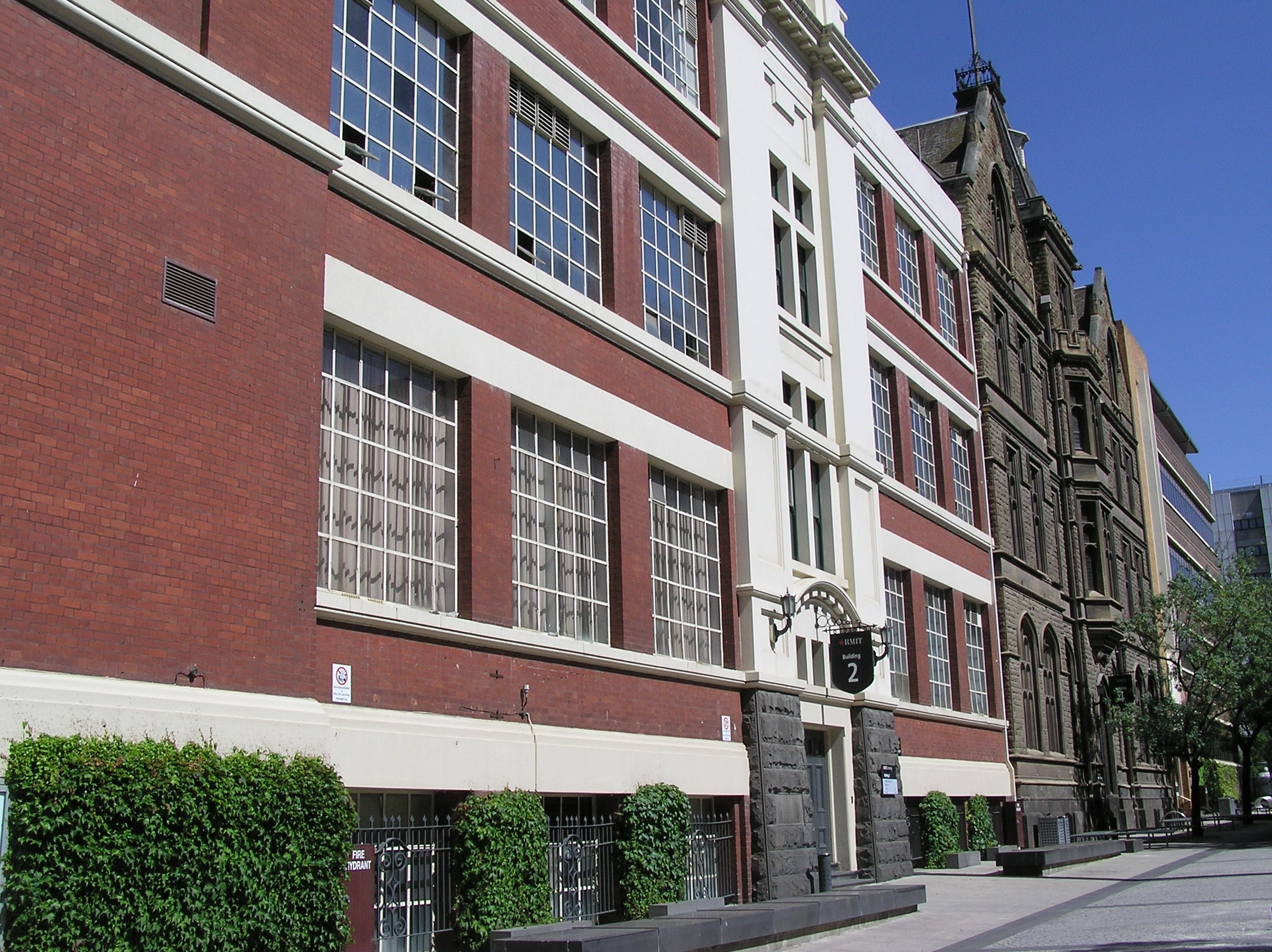
RMIT School of Art's original Building 2 and buildings 4 and 6 at the Melbourne City campus

Photography commenced at the College in 1891, and classes in wet-plate photography, photoengraving, photolithography and collotype and carbon printing were all offered by 1902. Instructor Ludovico Hart founded one of the earliest photographic clubs in Australia at the College in 1891, The Working Men's College Photographic Club, which continues today as The Melbourne Camera Club. Between 1904 and 1905, instructor James Aebi also took what were likely the first colour photographs in Australia at the College. Photography was dropped from the College curricula in 1914, but recommenced as a certificate course in the School of Art in 1936. It became a department of the School in 1956, with a diploma course developed by Dr. Neil Lewis from Kodak which he modelled on that of the Rochester Institute of Technology in the United States.

Art became a separate school at RMIT in 1917, as the School of Applied Art (and the second following the Trades School in 1890), with a building for its own purposes completed that year. The foundation stone for the new School building was laid by the Premier of Victoria, Sir Alexander Peacock, on 25 January 1915, and the School was officially opened with a 1 oz 15 karat gold and enamelled key by the Governor of Victoria, Sir Arthur Stanley, on 25 January 1917. Since 2008, the original key is held by Melbourne Museum as part of its history of technology collection.

== Courses and programs ==
The School of Art offers vocational certificate and diploma courses in visual arts and photography programs; bachelor's and master's degree courses in fine art and photography programs and a Doctorate of Philosophy in art. In 2020 it was ranked 11th in the world for Art and Design subjects in the QS World University Rankings, making it the top ranked art school in Australia.

== Galleries and research ==
The School of Art has a number of gallery spaces, the largest of these being in buildings 2 and 94 on the RMIT Melbourne City campus, and links to the RMIT campus union's First Site Gallery and the University's major gallery RMIT Gallery.

Research in the School of Art research focuses on contemporary art, photography and craft. CAST (Contemporary Art and Social Transformation) is the School's core research group, leading collaborative socially-engaged artistic projects.

== People ==
Notable alumni of the School of Art include: painters Charles Billich, Lindsay Edward, Vincent Fantauzzo, Harold Freedman, Kenneth Jack, Robert Jacks, Ligel Lambert, John Kelly, Sam Leach, Gareth Sansom and Charles Wheeler; drawers/illustrators David de Vries, Virginia Grayson, William Ellis Green, Robert Ingpen and Anne Judell; photographers Grahame King, Charles Page and Christian Thompson; sculptors/metalsmiths Kingsley Baird, Peter Corlett, Stuart Devlin, Raymond Boultwood Ewers, Leonard French, Clement Meadmore and Lenton Parr; and former National Gallery of Australia director Ron Radford.

Its notable faculty include: Godwin Bradbeer, Betty Churcher, Mikala Dwyer, Lindsay Edward, Vincent Fantauzzo, Harold Freedman, Virginia Grayson, Murray Griffin, Pamela Irving, Inge King, Simon Perry, Udo Sellbach, Napier Waller and Teisutis Zikaras.

== See also ==
- RMIT University
- RMIT School of Architecture and Design
