= Backchannel =

Use of networked computers for online conversation

Backchannel is the use of networked computers to maintain a real-time online conversation alongside the primary group activity or live spoken remarks. The term was coined from the linguistics term to describe listeners' behaviours during verbal communication.

The term "backchannel" generally refers to online conversation about the conference topic or speaker. Occasionally backchannel provides audience members a chance to fact-check the presentation.

First growing in popularity at technology conferences, backchannel is increasingly a factor in education where WiFi connections and laptop computers allow participants to use ordinary chat like IRC or AIM to actively communicate during presentation. More recent research include works where the backchannel is brought publicly visible, such as the ClassCommons, backchan.nl and Fragmented Social Mirror.

Twitter is also widely used today by audiences to create backchannels during broadcasting of content or at conferences. For example, television drama, other forms of entertainment and magazine programs. This practice is often also called live tweeting. Many conferences nowadays also have a hashtag that can be used by the participants to share notes and experiences; furthermore such hashtags can be user generated.

== History ==
Victor Yngve first used the phrase "back channel" in 1970 in a linguistic meaning, in the following passage: "In fact, both the person who has the turn and his partner are simultaneously engaged in both speaking and listening. This is because of the existence of what I call the back channel, over which the person who has the turn receives short messages such as 'yes' and 'uh-huh' without relinquishing the turn."

Such systems were widely imagined and tested in late 1990s and early 2000s. These cases include researcher's installations on conferences and classroom settings. The first famous instance of backchannel communications influencing a talk occurred on March 26, 2002, at the PC Forum conference, when Qwest CEO Joe Nacchio famously lamented the difficulties of raising capital. Journalists Dan Gillmor and Doc Searls posted accounts, from the audience, in real-time, to their weblogs. Buzz Bruggeman, a reader of Gillmor's, emailed information about a recent sizable transaction that had made Nacchio very wealthy; both Gillmor and Searls updated their weblogs with that information.

Forum host Esther Dyson wrote that "around that point, the audience turned hostile". Many commentators later attributed the audience's hostility to the information people shared while surfing and communicating on their laptops during Nacchio's remarks.

== Effect ==
Research has demonstrated that backchannels help participants to feel as contributing members, not passive followers and make them feel more social. However, the research is mixed on the nature of this discussions, and especially regarding social interaction on the backchannels: some cases report vast interaction where as others highlight that interaction on the platform was considered low. There are indicators that these tools however engage different members of the audience to provide their input.

== Use in education ==
Since its inception in 1998 at Argonne National Laboratory, the Internet2 initiative known as the Access Grid (a large-format presentation, video conferencing and interactive environment) has used backchannel communications to permit the node operators to pass URLs for display at another site, troubleshoot problems and even discuss what's for lunch at their location. The Access Grid backchannel has evolved from the use of a MOO to XMPP.

In 2009 Purdue University developed a tool called Hotseat that enabled students to comment on the course lectures in near real-time using social networking tools such as Facebook and Twitter.

Using a backchannel for educational purposes can function as a formal class activity or even an independent discussion without instructor participation and awareness. Aside from the normal discussion, a backchannel can also be used for note taking, asking questions, offering suggestions on different topics, and sharing resources with other students and faculty members. There are many different media networks out there that can be used as a backchannel. Including Twitter, Facebook, Yammer and Instant Messaging.

== Experiments ==
Joichi Ito's HeckleBot includes an LED text panel displaying phrases sent from the chat room to catch the attention of the speaker or audience. The USC Interactive Media Division has experimented with "Google Jockeys" to feed visual information and search results between the speakers and the backchannel, projected on multiple screens surrounding their seminars. Software like SubEthaEdit allows for more formal backchannel: collaborative notetaking. In 2007 the Building Learning Communities Conference in Boston, Massachusetts used tools such as Twitter and Skype to create backchannels that included participants who were not on location and at times in remote parts of the world. At times presenters were not aware of the backchannel and other occasions the presenters themselves were involved in the backchannel.
