= RMIT School of Fashion and Textiles =

School of Fashion and Textiles
- Parent institution: College of Design and Social Context, Royal Melbourne Institute of Technology
- Head: Professor Robyn Healy
- Campus: City, Brunswick
- Website: School of Fashion and Textiles

RMIT's School of Fashion and Textiles is an Australian tertiary education school within the College of Design and Social Context at the Royal Melbourne Institute of Technology (RMIT University), located in Melbourne, Victoria.

== See also ==
- RMIT University
