= RMIT School of Vocational Business Education =

Australian vocational education school

Coordinates: 37°48′28″S 144°57′48″E

School of Vocational Business Education
- Parent institution: College of Business, Royal Melbourne Institute of Technology
- Head: Ms Vicki Molloy
- Campus: City
- Website: School of Business TAFE

RMIT's School of Vocational Business Education is an Australian vocational education school within the College of Business at the Royal Melbourne Institute of Technology (RMIT University), located in Melbourne, Victoria.

== See also ==
- RMIT University
