= RMIT School of Electrical and Computer Engineering =

The RMIT School of Electrical and Computer Engineering was an Australian tertiary education school within the College of Science, Engineering and Health of RMIT University.

In 2016, the School of Electrical and Computer Engineering, the School of Civil, Environmental and Chemical Engineering and the School of Aerospace, Mechanical and Manufacturing Engineering were merged into a single School of Engineering, with campuses in the Melbourne CBD and Bundoora, Victoria.

== See also ==
- RMIT University
