= RMIT School of Life and Physical Sciences =

Coordinates: 37°48′28″S 144°57′48″E

The RMIT School of Life and Physical Sciences was an Australian tertiary education school within the College of Science, Engineering, and Health of RMIT University.

== See also ==
- RMIT University
