= RMIT School of Vocational Engineering, Health and Sciences =

Australian vocational education school

School of Vocational Engineering, Health and Sciences
- Parent institution: RMIT University College of Science, Engineering and Health
- Executive Dean: Peter Ryan
- Campus: City, Bundoora
- Website: School of Vocational Engineering, Health and Sciences

The RMIT School of Vocational Engineering, Health and Sciences is an Australian vocational education school within the College of Science Engineering and Health of RMIT University.

== See also ==
- RMIT University
