= RMIT Redbacks =

Australian sports collective

- Founded: 1968
- Based in: Melbourne, Australia
- Colours
- Owner: RMIT Sport
- Mascot: Rupert and Ruby the Redback spiders
- Website: RMIT Sport

The RMIT Redbacks are the sport collective of the Australian research University the Royal Melbourne Institute of Technology (RMIT), based at all campuses in Victoria and Ho Chi Minh City, Vietnam. The program is managed by the RMIT Sport team, part of RMIT Student Life.

Organised sport was first established at the Melbourne City Campus when the University re-branded from the Working Men's College, Melbourne to Royal Melbourne Institute of Technology in 1960.

RMIT has participated in the Australian University Games since 1992, initially competing as the Coburg Kangaroos due to the university's partnership with the Coburg-based Philip Institute of Technology (PIT). Following PIT's amalgamation into RMIT in 1992, RMIT re-branded as the Rhinos before changing the mascot to the Redbacks in 1997.

The RMIT Redbacks currently administers 40 clubs in competitive sport ranging from local grassroots level to semi-professional, available to student and non-student members.

== History ==
=== Working Men's College (1887–1960) ===
The Working Men's College (WMC) was an all-male tertiary institution opened in 1887 at the college's campus on La Trobe Street, Melbourne City following the initial financial support and founding by prominent Victorian parliamentarian and philanthropist Francis Ormond in 1881. Coordinated by the WMC, organised sport was played at the college as early as 1900 with students competing in athletics events and registering Australian Rules football and cricket teams to compete against fellow Universities in the area.

Following the end of World War I, the WMC formed clubs for tennis, swimming, rowing, lacrosse, baseball and boxing and entered annual multi-sport events, firstly the Inter-Technical School Carnival held in Brunswick and subsequently the Preparatory School Sports held in Queenscliffe. The increased player registrations for Australian Rules increased to allow the WMC to enter an Under 21 years team in the Senior Technical School Association and an Under 16 years team in the Junior Technical Schools’ Association. In 1927, the WMC coordinated its first interstate student sporting trip in an exchange of visits with Adelaide Technical High School.

In 1954, the WMC became the first Australian tertiary education provider to be awarded royal patronage for its service to the Commonwealth in the area of education and for its contribution to the World War II effort and was officially renamed the “Royal Melbourne Technical College”. Its name was officially changed to the Royal Melbourne Institute of Technology in 1960.

=== Emily McPherson College of Domestic Economy (1927–79) ===
The Emily McPherson College of Domestic Economy (EMCDE) was an Australian domestic science college for women situated on the corner of Russell Street and Victoria Street in Melbourne City adjacent to the current-day RMIT campus. On 30 June 1979, EMCDE was amalgamated with the RMIT campus.

=== Creation of Royal Melbourne Institute of Technology (1960–present) ===
Following its re-branding, RMIT became a co-educational institution allowing enrolment for female as well as male students. Students formed and operated sporting clubs that were run dependent on resources and funding from the RMIT sport and student life departments. Accordingly, the new administrative body the Sports Regulation Committee opened registration for mixed gender sides as well as all-male and all-female sports. Table tennis, softball, hockey, basketball, squash, badminton, netball, fencing, golf and volleyball were introduced to the campus between 1960 and 1969.

=== Amalgamation of Phillip Institute of Technology (1992) ===
The Phillip Institute of Technology (PIT) was a northern Melbourne tertiary college from 6 January 1982 to 30 June 1992. It was established in Preston and amalgamated into RMIT University on 1 July 1992.

== Sport clubs ==
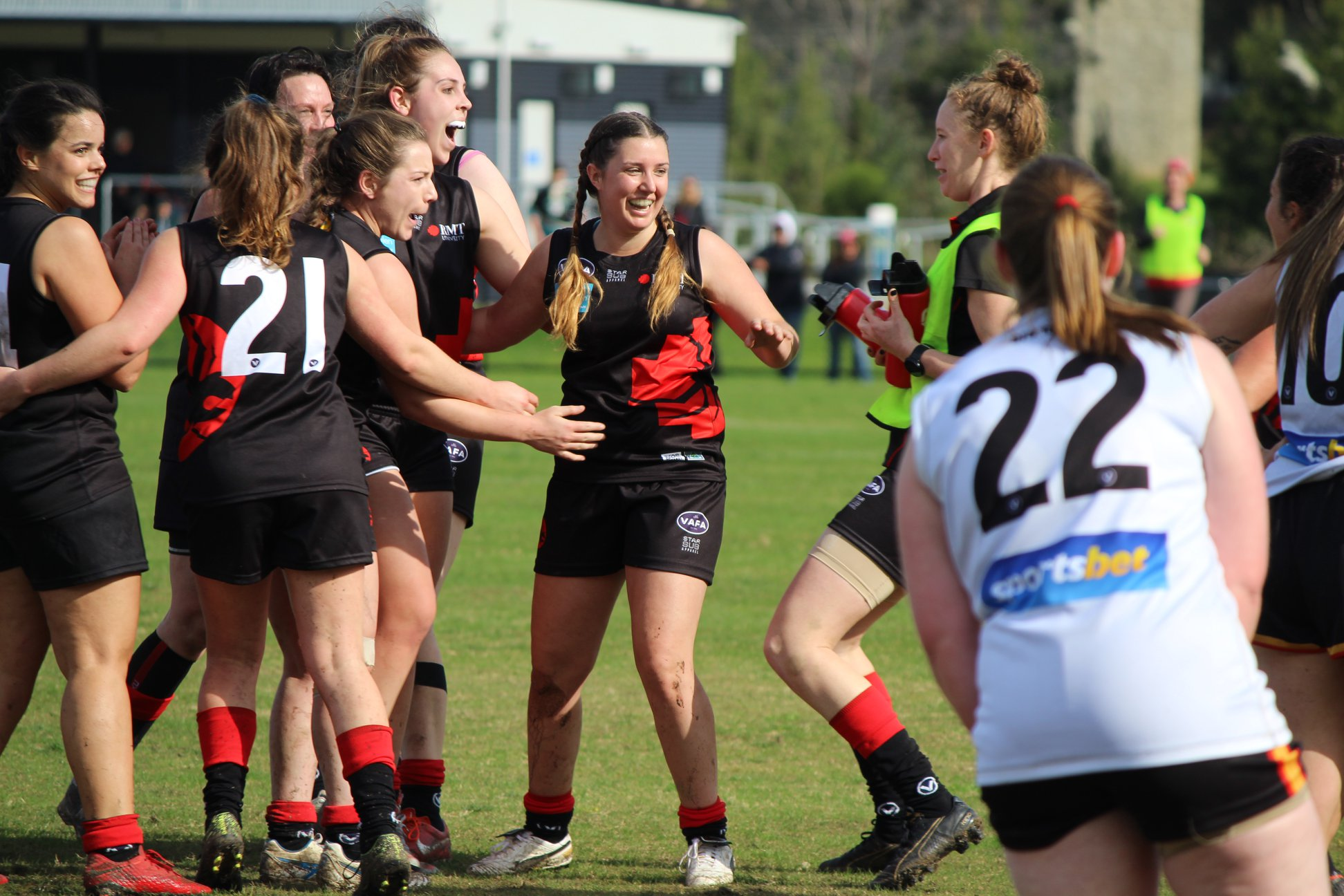
The RMIT Women's Football Academy Redbacks celebrate a goal at Bundoora Oval in 2019.

AFL Women's	Aikido	Badminton	Baseball	Basketball
Brazilian Jiu Jitsu	Cheerleading	Cricket	Cue Sports	Cycling
Dodgeball	eSports	Fencing	Futsal	Hockey
Karate	Kendo	Kung Fu	Lacrosse	Netball
Outdoors	Snow Sports	Soccer	Softball	Squash
Surf	Table Tennis	Taekwondo (ITF)	Taekwondo (WT)	Tennis
Tenpin Bowling	Touch Football	Ultimate Frisbee	Underwater	Volleyball
Water-ski and Wakeboard				

=== Basketball ===
In 2024, the RMIT men's basketball team won the Big V Division One title. They were subsequently promoted to the Big V Championship division in 2025. The women's team play in the Big V Division Two.

== National and Regional Uni Games ==
The RMIT Redbacks compete in the following annual sport competitions.

=== Australian University Games (1992–2017) ===
The Australian University Games (AUG), since reformatted and renamed as the UniSport Nationals Division 1 and UniSport Nationals Division 2, was an annual national multi-sport event held between the 43 Australian universities and tertiary institutions. First held in Melbourne in 1992, the AUG were hosted in Queensland for eight years, Victoria for five years, Western Australia and New South Wales for four years, South Australia for three years and the Northern Territory and the ACT for one year.

RMIT won the John White Spirit of the Games Shield as the University that best displayed exemplary behaviour, excellent team spirit and fair competition in the 2009 and 2011 AUG at the Gold Coast.

=== Southern University Games (2011–17) ===
The Southern University Games (SUG), since reformatted and renamed as the UniSport Nationals Division 1/Division 2, was an annual regional multi-sport event held between the Australian universities and tertiary institutions from Victoria, South Australia and Tasmania. First held in Ballarat in 2002, the SUG reformatted in 2017.

RMIT finished first in the SUG in 2008 and 2015–2017, finished second in 2009–11 and 2013–14 and was awarded the Spirit of the Games Award in 2009–12 and 2014.

=== Nationals Division 1 & 2 (2018–2019) ===
Following the 2017 Australian University Games, UniSport reformatted the nationals and regionals events into a two-tiered competition Nationals Division 1 and Nationals Division 2. Universities could enter one team per sport across the two divisions with student athletes able to compete in multiple events. The competition was merged into a single week-long festival ahead of the 2020 games.

=== Nationals Snow (2011–2019) ===
Nationals Snow is an annual multi-discipline snow sport event held between Australian universities and tertiary institutions. Student athletes compete in a variety of disciplines including slalom, boarder cross, slopestyle and rails.

=== Eastern University Games (2013) ===
The Eastern University Games was an annual multi-sport event held between Australian universities and tertiary institutions from New South Wales and the Australian Capital Territory. RMIT entered a team for the surfing (men's) and surfing (women's) events in the 2013 Wollongong Games.

== Events ==
=== RMIT Soccer Tour of China (2002–04) ===
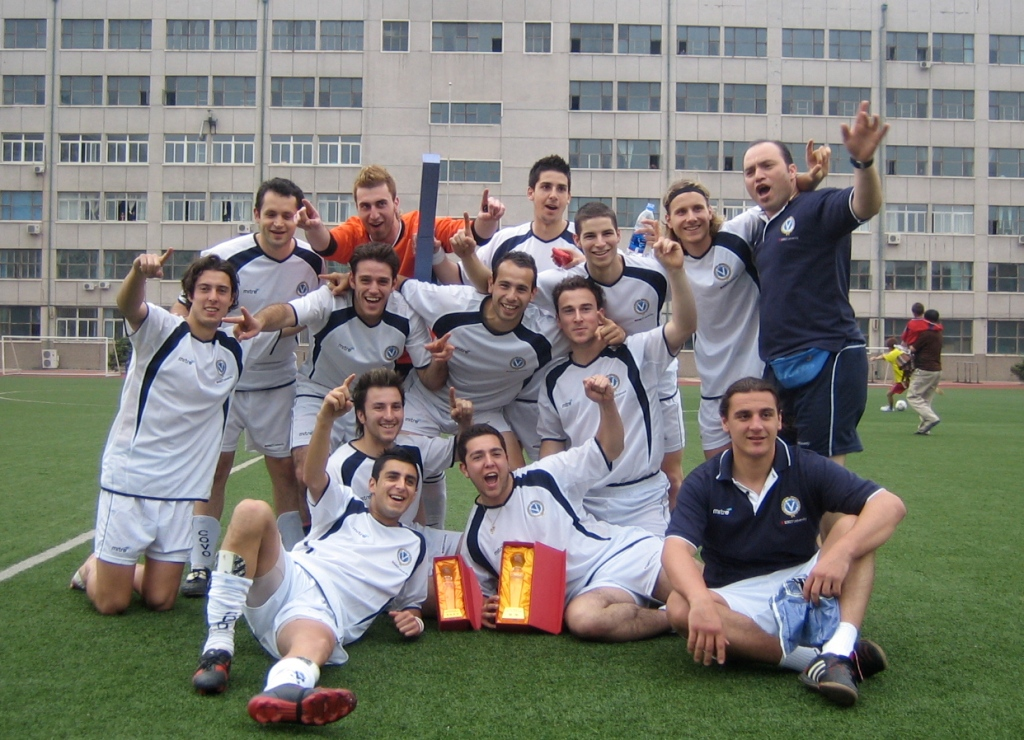
The RMIT Redbacks Soccer Team celebrates victory during its 2004 China Tour.

The RMIT Redbacks’ Soccer club conducted annual tours of China between 2002 and 2004. The tours were supported by the University, the Australian Football Federation, the Victorian Soccer Federation, Australian University Sport, then-SBS Head of Sport Les Murray and the Honourable Lord Mayor of the City of Melbourne John So.

In 2002, the Redbacks played a five-match tour against teams from Chinese universities. The following year, RMIT planned an expanded 16-day tour that saw the Redbacks compete against teams from seven Chinese universities with one of the matches being broadcast on Chinese national television.

=== NBL Big Hustle 3x3 Nationals (2018) ===
RMIT hosted the inaugural NBL Big Hustle 3x3 Nationals at its Melbourne City Campus in 2018. The two-day tournament was held at the A’Beckett Urban Square and featured 24 teams from 17 Australian universities and tertiary institutions playing in Open Men and Open Women categories between July 31 and August 1.

Macquarie University finished first in the Open Men category with Monash University winning the Open Women category. The RMIT Redbacks’ Open Men side finished second and the Open Women side finished fifth.

=== Malaysian Tenpin Bowling Tournament (2019) ===
The RMIT Redbacks’ Tenpin Bowling Team competed in the 2019 UiTM International Sports Fiesta in Malaysia at Universiti Teknologi Mara in the city of Shah Alam between July 31-August 4.

RMIT as the first team from Australia to compete at the international multi-sport event. The four-player team was made up of student athletes Jordan Wallace, Josh Robinson, Daniel Perrella and Richard Tran with Terry Lu acting as team manager.

Perrella won gold in the Men's Singles and Wallace claimed the bronze medal in the same event. In the Men's Doubles event, Tran and Robinson won silver. The Redbacks finished fourth in the team events format.

== Elite Athletes ==
=== International Athletes ===
The following international athletes are alumni or current students of RMIT University.

Athlete	Sport
Ian Browne	Cycling
Christine Envall	Bodybuilding
Jessica Gallagher	Alpine Skiing Track and field Tandem cycling
Elizabeth Gardner	Freestyle skiing
Steve Hooker	Pole Vaulting
Laura Hingston	Diving
Lydia Lassila	Freestyle Skiing
Bill Lawry	Cricket
James Marburg	Rower
David Morris	Freestyle Skiing
Nick Morris	Wheelchair basketball
Monique Murphy	Swimming
Christine Nunn	Squash
Elizabeth Patrick	Coxswain
Colin Ridgway	NFL
Catherine Skinner	Shooting
Jared Tallent	Racewalking
James Tomkins	Rowing
Peter Thomson	Golf
Paul Van Der Ploeg	Cross-country mountain cycling
Max Walker	Cricket/AFL
Julian Wiener	Cricket

=== National Athletes ===
The following national athletes are alumni or current students of RMIT University.

Athlete	Sport
Lauren Arnell	Australian Rules (Carlton/Brisbane)
Laura Attard	Australian Rules (Carlton)
Shae Audley	Australian Rules (Carlton)
Ron Barassi	Australian Rules (Melbourne/Carlton)
Lauren Brazzale	Australian Rules (Carlton)
Hayley Bullas	Australian Rules (West Coast)
Stephanie Chiocci	Australian Rules (Collingwood)
Darcy Daniher	Australian Rules (Essendon)
Roger Dean	Australian Rules (Richmond)
John Dugdale	Australian Rules (North Melbourne)
Jack Edwards	Australian Rules (North Melbourne)
Carrie Graf	Basketball (Nunawading Spectres)
Keith Grieg	Australian Rules (North Melbourne)
David Hille	Australian Rules (Essendon)
Tony Jewell	Australian Rules (Richmond)
Gus Johnston	Hockey (New South Wales)
Lauren Morecroft	Australian Rules (Western Bulldogs)
Karen Paxman	Australian Rules (Melbourne)
Bob Skilton	Australian Rules (South Melbourne)
Jim Stynes	Australian Rules (Melbourne)
Brian Taylor	Australian Rules (Richmond/Collingwood)

== Captains ==
In 2010, RMIT Sport began the annual practice of appointing a male and female student as co-captains for the duration of the year. The students represented the University in sport events and in public appearances.

Year	Captains
2020	Zeb Jarvis and Dana Tieman
2019	Tyson Lingham and Rebecca McInerney
2018	Marcus Vaiano and Emily Buckland
2017	Alexander Bonacci and Sarah Collins
2016	Jack Plowman and Lilly Walsh
2015	Ben Marris and Tessa Bruno
2014	Patrick Hutton and Hannah Wyatt
2013	Aaron Bettio-Sandlant and Teagan Nugent
2012	Kieran Wallis and Louise Grant
2011	Jake Mutimer and Samantha Coates
2010	Stefan Olszewski and Samantha Coates

== National and Regional Uni Games Results ==
=== Australian UniGames Nationals Results Summary (1992–2019) ===
Year	Host city	Sports	Medals
1992	Melbourne	Hockey (Men's)	Hockey (Men's): Gold
1993	Brisbane		
1994	Wollongong		
1995	Darwin		
1996	Canberra		
1997	Melbourne	Netball (Women's)	Netball (Women's): Gold
1998	Melbourne	Rowing 8s (Women's)	Rowing 8s (Women's): Gold
1999	Perth		
2000	Ballarat	Rowing 8s (Women's)	Rowing 8s (Women's): Bronze
2001	Sydney	Hockey (Men's), Rowing 8s (Women's)	Hockey Men's): Gold Rowing 8s (Women's): Bronze
2002	Adelaide		
2003	Newcastle	Hockey (Men's)	Hockey (Men's): Gold
2004	Perth		
2005	Brisbane	Beach Volleyball (Men's), Water Polo	Beach Volleyball (Men's): Bronze Water Polo: Bronze
2006	Adelaide	Basketball (Men's), Volleyball (Women's)	Basketball (Men's): Silver Volleyball (Women's): Silver
2007	Gold Coast	Beach Volleyball (Men's)	Beach Volleyball (Men's): Silver
2008	Melbourne		
2009	Gold Coast	AFL (Women's), Athletics, Badminton (Men's), Badminton (Women's), Beach Volleyball, Cycling, Fencing, Golf, Handball, Hockey (Men's), Hockey (Women's), Judo, Lawn Bowls, Netball (Mixed), Netball (Women's), Rugby 7s, Soccer (Men's), Soccer (Women's), Squash, Swimming, Table Tennis, Taekwondo, Tennis, Tenpin Bowling, Touch Football, Ultimate Frisbee, Volleyball (Men's), Volleyball (Women's), Water Polo (Men's), Water Polo (Women's)	Volleyball (Mixed): Silver
2010	Perth	AFL (Men's), AFL (Women's), Athletics, Badminton (Men's), Badminton (Women's), Baseball (Men's), Basketball (Men's), Basketball (Women's). Beach Volleyball, Cycling, Fencing, Golf, Handball (Men's), handball (Women's), Hockey (Men's), Hockey (Women's), Judo, Lawn Bowls, Netball (Mixed), Netball (Women's), Rowing, Rugby 7s, Soccer (Men's), Soccer (Women's), Squash, Swimming, Table Tennis, Taekwondo, Tennis, Tenpin Bowling, Touch Football, Ultimate Frisbee, Volleyball (Men's). Volleyball (Women's), Water Polo (Men's), Water Polo (Women's)	*SPIRIT OF THE GAMES* Volleyball (Mixed): Gold Beach Volleyball (Men's): Silver
2011	Gold Coast	AFL (Men's), AFL (Women's), Athletics (Men's), Badminton (Men's), Badminton (Women's), Basketball (Men's), Basketball (Women's), Beach Volleyball (Men's), Football (Men's), Netball (Women's), Netball (Mixed), Swimming (Men's), Swimming (Women's), Table Tennis (Men's). Taekwondo, Tennis (Men's), Tennis (Women's), Tenpin Bowling, Ultimate Frisbee, Volleyball (Mixed), Water Polo (Women's)	AFL (Women's): Gold Tenpin Bowling: Gold Netball (Women's): Gold Netball (Mixed): Gold Tenpin Bowling: Gold Badminton (Men's): Silver Beach Volleyball (Men's): Silver Beach Volleyball (Mixed): Silver Basketball (Women's): Bronze Beach Volleyball (Women's): Bronze Football (Men's): Bronze Tennis (Women's): Bronze
2012	Adelaide	AFL (Women's), Athletics, Badminton (Men's), Baseball (Men's), Basketball (Men's), Beach Volleyball (Mixed), Cycling (Men's), Football (Men's), Golf (Men's), Hockey (Men's), Hockey (Women's), Netball (Mixed), Netball (Women's), Rowing (Men's), Sailing, Swimming (Women's), Table Tennis, Taekwondo (Men's), Tennis (Men's), Tenpin Bowling, Volleyball (Men's), Volleyball (Women's), Water Polo (Men's), Water Polo (Women's),	*SPIRIT OF THE GAMES* Volleyball (Mixed): Gold AFL (Women's): Gold Tenpin Bowling: Gold Netball (Mixed): Gold Cycling: Gold Golf (Men's): Silver Netball (Women's): Silver
2013	Gold Coast	AFL (Men's), AFL (Women's), Athletics (Men's), Athletics (Women's), Badminton (Men's), Badminton (Women's), Basketball (Men's). Basketball (Women's), Beach Volleyball (Mixed), Cycling (Men's), Cycling (Women's), Soccer (Men's), Golf (Men's), Handball, Hockey (Men's), Hockey (Women's), Lawn Bowls, Netball (Mixed), Netball (Women's), Sailing, Squash, Table Tennis, Tenpin Bowling, Ultimate Frisbee, Volleyball (Men's)	AFL (Women's): Gold Tenpin Bowling: Gold Athletics (Women's): Silver Beach Volleyball: Silver Golf (Men's): Silver
2014	Sydney	Athletics (Men's), Athletics (Women's), AFL (Men's), AFL (Women's), Baseball, Badminton (Men's), Badminton (Women's), Basketball (Women's)	Tenpin Bowling: Gold Golf: Gold AFL (Women's): Silver Beach Volleyball: Silver Athletics (Women's): Bronze AFL (Women's): Bronze
2015	Gold Coast		AFL (Women's): Gold Lawn Bowls: Gold Tennis (Women's): Gold Tenpin Bowling: Silver Beach Volleyball (Mixed): Silver Golf: Silver AFL (Men's): Bronze Cycling (Women's): Bronze Kendo (Men's): Bronze
2016	Perth		AFL (Women's): Gold Golf: Gold Futsal (Men's): Gold Basketball (Men's): Silver Beach Volleyball (Men's): Silver Fencing (Women's): Silver Tenpin Bowling: Silver Netball: Bronze
2017	Gold Coast		Tenpin Bowling: Gold Cycling: Gold Basketball (Men's): Silver AFL (Women's): Bronze Netball (Women's): Bronze
2018 – Nationals Div 1	Gold Coast		*SPIRIT OF THE GAMES* Cycling (Men): Gold Tenpin Bowling: Gold AFL (Women's): Silver Basketball (Men's): Silver Cycling (Women): Silver Futsal (Men): Silver Lawn Bowls: Silver Tennis (Men): Silver 3x3 Basketball (Men): Silver (Melbourne) Golf (Men): Bronze Netball (Mixed): Bronze Softball: Bronze
2019 – Nationals Div 1	Gold Coast		*SPIRIT OF THE GAMES* Futsal (Men): Gold Tennis (Men): Gold Tennis (Women): Gold Tenpin Bowling: Gold Marathon (Women): Gold (Melbourne) Cycling (Men): Silver Surfing (Women): Silver (Manly) Basketball (Men's): Bronze
2019 – Nationals Snow	Thredbo		Alpine Skiing (Women): Gold Snowboard (Men): Gold Freestyle Ski (Women): Silver

== Mascots ==
Following the amalgamation of the Phillip Institute of Technology, the mascot of the RMIT sport collective was the Kangaroo (the University continued to play under the name Coburg until 1995). In 1995, RMIT Sport re-branded the sport collective under the University's banner and anointed the mascot as the Rhinos ahead of the Australian University Games held in Darwin. Following a proposal from the Sport Regulation Committee (SRC), RMIT changed the mascot to the Redbacks in 1997. The RMIT Redbacks logo features a redback spider silhouette with the University's pixel logo as a red background.
