= Virginia Grayson =

Australian artist (born 1967)

- Born: 1967 (age 58–59); Palmerston North, New Zealand
- Education: Victoria University of Wellington, New Zealand; RMIT School of Art, Melbourne
- Known for: Drawing
- Notable work: No conclusions drawn – self portrait (2008)
- Awards: Dobell Prize (2008)

Virginia Grayson (born 1967), also known as Ginny Grayson, is a New Zealand-born Australian artist, and winner of the Dobell Prize for Drawing.

== Biography ==
Grayson was born in 1967 in Palmerston North, New Zealand. She trained in film and media studies at Victoria University of Wellington. In the early 1990s she moved to New York for a period, before moving to Sydney, and later to Melbourne. She trained at the RMIT School of Art, and held an exhibition in the School's gallery in 2009.

No conclusions drawn – self portrait (2008)

In 2008, Grayson was working in a studio in Melbourne. In September that year, it was announced that she had won that year's Dobell Prize for Drawing, displayed at the Art Gallery of New South Wales, in a competition that had 586 entries. The competition was judged by a former Queensland Art Gallery curator, Anne Kirker.

Grayson's work, in pencil, charcoal and watercolour, was titled No conclusions drawn – self portrait. It portrays the artist standing in her studio. Grayson observed that the work reflected her "state of uncertainty" about her artistic output at that time, during which she regularly destroyed her drawings in "fits of frustration". The Sydney Morning Herald arts writer Louise Schwartzkoff described the portrait as "sombre", where the subject "stares grimly into the distance". When asked what she would do with the AUS$20,000 money from the Dobell Prize, she responded that she "wouldn't mind getting my ute fixed".

Robert Nelson, writing for The Age, considered Grayson's drawing to be influenced by Alberto Giacometti, and "is curious and inquiring, as if always searching for the place, ratios and weight of her motif".
