= RMIT School of Global, Urban and Social Studies =

Public policy school of RMIT University

School of Global, Urban and Social Studies
- Parent institution: College of Design and Social Context, Royal Melbourne Institute of Technology
- Head: Professor David Hayward
- Campus: City
- Website: School of Global, Urban and Social Studies

RMIT's School of Global, Urban and Social Studies is an Australian tertiary education school within the College of Design and Social Context at the Royal Melbourne Institute of Technology (RMIT University), located in Melbourne, Victoria. This university organizational unit confers an interdisciplinary PhD in "Global, Urban and Social Studies"

== See also ==
- RMIT University
