= RMIT School of Architecture and Design =

Arts school of RMIT University

School of Architecture and Urban Design
- Parent institution: College of Design and Social Context, Royal Melbourne Institute of Technology
- Head: Professor Richard Blythe
- Campus: City, Brunswick
- Website: School of Architecture and Design

RMIT's School of Architecture and Urban Design is an Australian tertiary education school within the College of Design and Social Context at the Royal Melbourne Institute of Technology (RMIT University), located in Melbourne, Victoria.

A skilled hand and cultivated mind: a guide to the architecture and art of RMIT University by Harriet Edquist and Elizabeth Grierson focuses on architecture and art in the university's history and their relationships to staff, students and communities.

38 south: urban architecture laboratory by Nigel Bertram and Shane Murray is the document of record for urban-focused architectural research from the School of Architecture and Design at RMIT University. The Urban Architecture Laboratory was established in 2002 with the explicit aim of providing a specialised research environment for intensive and focused architectural research that engages with contemporary urban issues.

== RMIT Design Archives ==
The RMIT Design Archives is a substantial research collection held by the School of Architecture and Design. The archives collect material that primarily relates to design in Melbourne during the 20th century.

It also contains a substantial fashion collection of costume, couture, fashion illustration and textiles which includes the Prue Acton, Alfredo Bouret, Frances Burke, Louis Kahan, Hall Ludlow, Robert Maltus and Bee Taplin collections.

== See also ==
- RMIT University
- RMIT School of Design TAFE
