= RMIT School of Computing Technologies =

Australian tertiary education school

The RMIT School of Computer Technologies is an Australian tertiary education school within the STEM College of RMIT University.

== Location ==
The school is located in Building 14 (levels 8 to 11) in Swanston Street at the RMIT City campus. Previously the school was located in Building 10 at RMIT's City campus and also part of the school was located at RMIT's Bundoora campus.

== History ==
The first computer at RMIT, an Elliott Automation model 803, was acquired at the instigation of the Department of Mathematics during the early 1960s, and located on the ground floor of Storey Hall. The School of Computer Science and Information Technology (which has had several names) became a separate academic department of RMIT in 1980. The first PhD in Computer Science awarded at RMIT was in 1988 to Dr Alan Kent for his thesis on "File access methods based on descriptors and superimposed coding".

In 1990, the Multimedia Database Systems group within the school became a research centre led by Professor Ron Sacks-Davis. Following the development of TeraText (a non-relational text database system), the commercial arm of the group (including TeraText) was in 2001 spun off into a separate company, InQuirion. RMIT subsequently sold TeraText and InQuirion to SAIC in 2006.
