= Cultural Studies ↔ Critical Methodologies =

- Discipline: Cultural studies
- Language: English
- Edited by: Norman K. Denzin

Publication details
- History: 2001-present
- Publisher: SAGE Publications
- Frequency: Bimonthly
- Impact factor: 0.683 (2021)

Standard abbreviations
- ISO 4: Cult. Stud. Crit. Methodol.

Indexing
- ISSN: 1532-7086 (print); 1552-356X (web)
- LCCN: 00212897
- OCLC no.: 45441373

Links
- Journal homepage; Online access; Online archive

Cultural Studies ↔ Critical Methodologies is a bimonthly peer-reviewed academic journal that covers research methods in the field of cultural studies.

The journal's editor-in-chief is Michael Giardina (Florida State University). It was established in 2001 and is published by Sage Publishing.

== Abstracting and indexing ==
The journal is abstracted and indexed in:

- International Bibliography of the Social Sciences
- SafetyLit
- Scopus
- Sociological Abstracts
