= RMIT School of Education =

School of Education
- Parent institution: College of Design and Social Context, Royal Melbourne Institute of Technology
- Head: Professor Robert Strathdee
- Campus: Bundoora
- Website: School of Education

RMIT's School of Education is an Australian tertiary education school within the College of Design and Social Context at the Royal Melbourne Institute of Technology (RMIT University), located in Melbourne, Victoria.

== See also ==
- RMIT University
