= RMIT School of Property, Construction and Project Management =

Australian school at the Royal Melbourne Institute of Technology

School of Property, Construction and Project Management
- Parent institution: College of Design and Social Context, Royal Melbourne Institute of Technology
- Head: Professor Ron Wakefield
- Campus: City, Bundoora
- Website: School of Property, Construction and Project Management

RMIT's School of Property, Construction and Project Management is an Australian tertiary education school within the College of Design and Social Context at the Royal Melbourne Institute of Technology (RMIT University), located in Melbourne, Victoria.

== See also ==
- RMIT University
