= RMIT School of Design TAFE =

The RMIT School of Design TAFE was an Australian vocational education school within the College of Design and Social Context of RMIT University.

It is now known as the School of Design under RMIT University in Victoria, Australia. Design disciplines include communication design, industrial design, and digital design. The School offers graduate, post graduate and research programs.

== See also ==
- RMIT University
