= Access Grid =

Access Grid is a collection of resources and technologies that enables large format audio and video based collaboration between groups of people in different locations. The Access Grid is an ensemble of resources, including multimedia large-format displays, presentation and interactive environments, and interfaces with grid computing middleware and visualization environments. In simple terms, it is advanced videoconferencing using big displays and with multiple simultaneous camera feeds at each node (site). The technology was invented at Argonne National Laboratory, Chicago.

The "Alliance Chautauqua 99", a series of two-day conferences on computational science organised by the NCSA, was the first large-scale Access Grid event. The Access Grid was later demonstrated at Supercomputing'99 in Portland, Oregon to an international audience.

As of 2005, there were well over 500 nodes around the world that allow for various forms of creative and academic collaborations. Access Grid users tend to use XMPP as their text-based back-end. Indeed, the new version of the Access Grid Toolkit integrates an XMPP client with the Access Grid software.

== International Access Grid ==
=== Australia and New Zealand ===
The Access Grid has generated interest and activity in Australia, where factors such as widely disparate geographic locations and relatively low population-densities have previously presented great obstacles to "in-person" collaborations.

The International Centre of Excellence for Education in Mathematics (ICE-EM) have funded 10 Australian universities to construct nodes. The nodes allow the mathematics postgraduate community and professionals access to international experts who are visiting Australia. The nodes also provide a means of carrying out collaborative research with peers within Australia and internationally.

Australia's first Access Grid node was built at Sydney VisLab at the Australian Technology Park in August 2001.

By 2007, the Australian AG network had grown to more than 30 sites serviced by Asia Pacific Access Grid (APAG) venue servers at University of Sydney (AG2) and the University of Queensland (AG3).

The University of Queensland began providing AG facilities in 2002, with increasing usage every year since then. In 2004, the UQ Vislab began providing the Access Grid installation packages for various Linux distributions, as well as FreeBSD, to the wider AG community, although intellectual property concerns have placed the future of the Linux-based technologies into doubt. It has also been active in developing various enhancements and add-ons including shared applications for remote sensor monitoring shared application, Remote Thermo and shared GIS based on GRASS.

By December 2006, each New Zealand university has an operational AG node, and use of the grid is increasing.

As of late 2006, development work included a federated data management using Storage Resource Broker (SRB) and high definition video communications.

=== United Kingdom ===
UK academic community support for Access Grid Toolkit, IOCOM and EVO technologies on JANET is provided by the JANET Videoconferencing Management Centre.

The first Access Grid (AG) node was built at the University of Manchester in 2001, with Jisc-funded support from the Access Grid Support Centre (AGSC) in Manchester from April 2004 to July 2011. There are now over three hundred AG nodes registered in the UK, ranging from full room nodes to small individual desktop nodes.

There are a number of academic projects using AG technologies such as the Taught Course Centre and MAGIC (postgraduate mathematics) mathematics projects.
