= Royal Melbourne Institute of Technology =

Public university in Melbourne, Australia

- Coat of arms
- Other name: RMIT University
- Former names: Working Men's College (1887–1933); Melbourne Technical College (1934–1959)
- Motto: Latin: Perita manus, mens exculta
- Motto in English: "A skilled hand, a cultivated mind"
- Type: Public research university
- Established: 1887; 139 years ago (college); 1992; 34 years ago (university)
- Founder: Francis Ormond
- Accreditation: TEQSA
- Affiliations: Australian Technology Network (ATN)
- Budget: A$1.62 billion (2023)
- Visitor: Governor of Victoria
- Chancellor: Peggy O'Neal
- Vice-Chancellor: Alec Cameron
- Total staff: 11,492 (2023)
- Students: 91,544 (2023)
- Undergraduates: 54,422 (2023)
- Postgraduates: 13,553 coursework 2,558 research (2023)
- Other students: 14,809 VE (2023); 4,355 SDENA (2022); 346 OUA (2023); 1,501 other (2023)
- Location: Melbourne, Victoria, Australia; 37.8082°S 144.9643°E
- Campus: Metropolitan with multiple sites
- Colours: Red Blue (Note: RMIT Red and Blue are the primary colours used by the university. The official ceremonial colours of RMIT are dark green (vert), gold (or) and white (argent) as characterised in the tincture of its coat of arms and as described in Murray-Smith & Dare 1987.)
- Nicknames: Redbacks; Old Paradians
- Sporting affiliations: UniSport; EAEN; UBL
- Mascot: Rupert the Redback Spider
- Website: rmit.edu.au

The Royal Melbourne Institute of Technology (abbreviated as RMIT University) is a public research university located in the city of Melbourne in Victoria, Australia. Proposed by Francis Ormond, and established in 1887 by Ormond, the Victorian government, Trades Hall Council and others, it is the seventh-oldest institution of higher education in Australia, a founding member of the Australian Technology Network (ATN), and a member of Universities Australia (UA).

RMIT began as a night school offering classes in art, science and technology in response to the Industrial Revolution in Australia. It was a publicly funded tertiary college and trade school (first by the Victorian Colonial Government, later by the Federal Government) for more than a hundred years before merging with the Phillip Institute of Technology to become a public university in 1992. It has an enrolment of around 95,000 higher and vocational education students. With an annual revenue of around A$1.5 billion. It is ranked 15th in the World for art and design subjects in the QS World University Rankings.

The main campus of RMIT is situated on the northern edge of the historic Hoddle Grid in the city centre of Melbourne. It has two satellite campuses in the city's northern suburbs of Brunswick and Bundoora and a training site situated on the RAAF Williams base in the western suburb of Point Cook. It also has a training site at Bendigo Airport in the Victorian city of Bendigo and a research site in Hamilton near the Grampians National Park. In Asia, it has two branch campuses in Ho Chi Minh City and Hanoi and a training centre in Da Nang in Vietnam as well as teaching partnerships in Mainland China, Hong Kong, Indonesia, Singapore and Sri Lanka. In Europe, it has a research and collaboration centre in the Spanish city of Barcelona.

== History ==
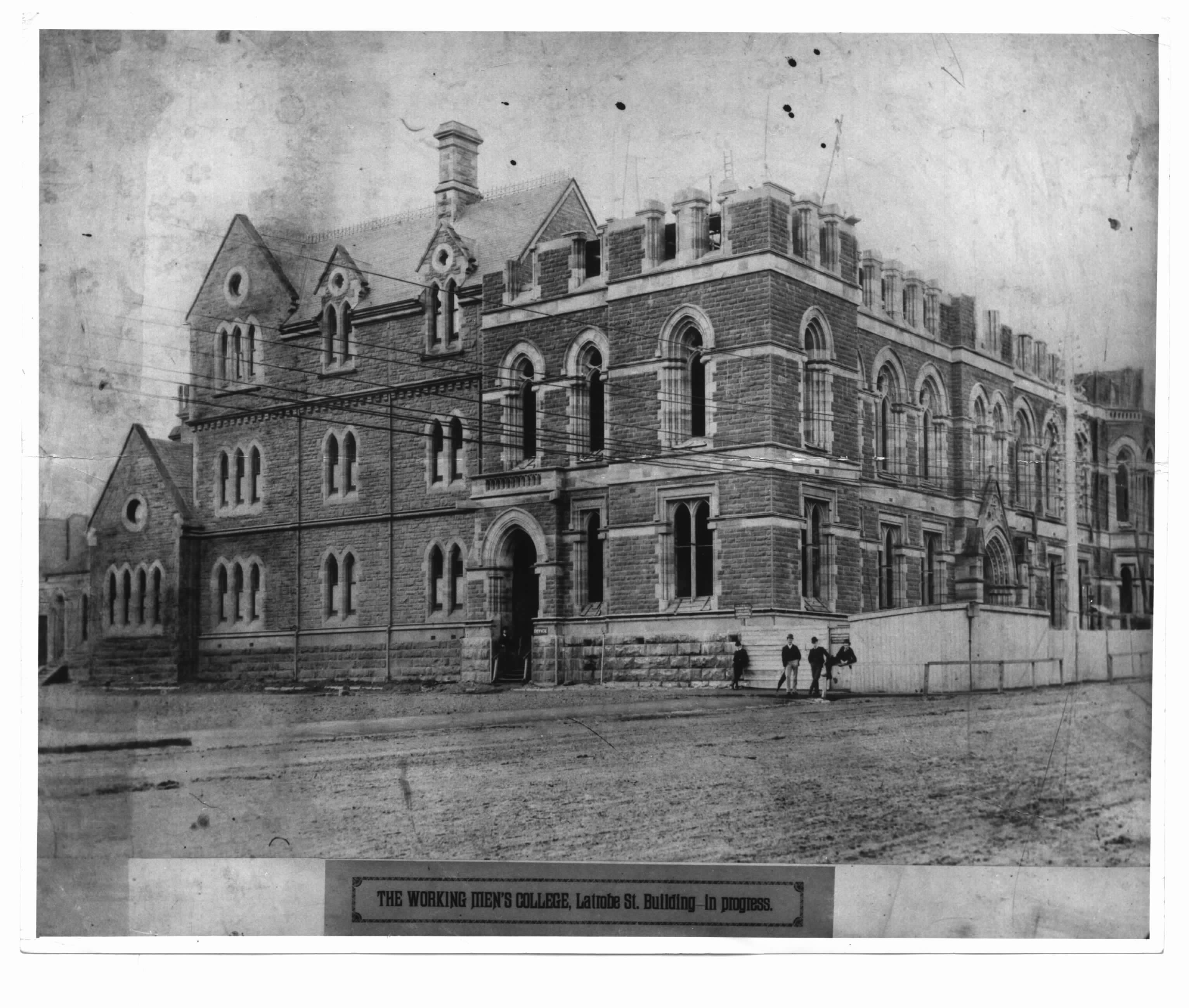
Construction of the Working Men's College (1880s)

=== Early history (before 1887) ===
The antecedent of RMIT, the Working Men's College of Melbourne, was founded by the Scottish-born grazier and politician the Hon. Francis Ormond in the 1880s. Planning began in 1881, with Ormond basing his model for the college on the Birkbeck Literary and Scientific Institution (now a constituent college of the University of London), Brighton College of Art (now the University of Brighton), Royal College of Art and the Working Men's College of London.

Ormond donated the sum of £5,000 toward the foundation of the college. He was supported in the Victorian Parliament by Charles Pearson and in the Melbourne Trades Hall by William Emmett Murphy. The workers' unions of Melbourne rallied their members to match Ormond's donation. The site for the college, on the corners of Bowen Street and La Trobe Street, opposite the Melbourne Public Library, was donated by the Victorian Government.

=== Working Men's College (1887–1960) ===
Early crest (1900s)

The Working Men's College of Melbourne opened on 4 June 1887 with a gala ceremony at the Melbourne Town Hall, becoming the fifth tertiary education provider in Victoria (the Melbourne Athenaeum was founded in 1839, the University of Melbourne in 1853, the Ballarat School of Mines in 1870 and the Bendigo School of Mines in 1873). It took 320 enrollments on its opening night.

It opened as a night school for instruction in "art, science and technology"—in the words of its founder—"especially to working men". Ormond was a firm believer in the transformative power of education and believed the college would be of "great importance and value" to the industrialisation of Melbourne during the late-19th century. In 1904, it was incorporated under the Companies Act as a private college.

Between the turn of the 20th century and the 1930s, it expanded over the neighbouring Old Melbourne Gaol and constructed buildings for new art, engineering and radio schools. It also made its first contribution to Australia's war effort through training of returned military personnel from World War I. Following a petition by students, it officially changed its name to the Melbourne Technical College in 1934.

The expanded college made a greater contribution to Australia's effort during World War II by training a sixth of the country's military personnel—including the majority of its Royal Australian Air Force communication officers. It also trained 2000 civilians in munitions manufacturing and was commissioned by the Australian Government to manufacture military aircraft parts—including the majority of parts for the Beaufort Bomber.

=== RMIT (1960–1992) ===
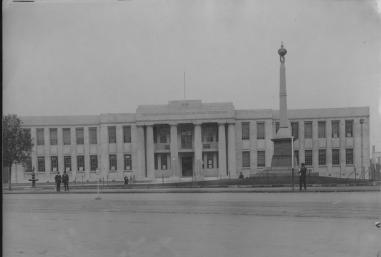
Emily McPherson College (1930s)

In 1954, it became the first Australian tertiary education provider to be awarded royal patronage (by Elizabeth II) for its service to the Commonwealth in the area of education and for its contribution to the war effort; and was officially renamed the "Royal Melbourne Technical College". It became (and remains to this day) the only higher education institution in Australia with the right of the prefix "Royal" along with the use of the Australian monarchy's regalia.

Its name was officially changed to the Royal Melbourne Institute of Technology in 1960. During the mid-20th century, it was restructured as a provider of general higher and vocational education and pioneered dual sector education in Australia. It also began an engagement with Southeast Asia during this time (under the Australian Government's Colombo Plan). In 1979, the neighbouring Emily McPherson College of Domestic Economy joined with RMIT.

=== RMIT University (1992) ===
After merging with the Phillip Institute of Technology on 1 July 1992, it became a public university by act of the Victorian Government under the Royal Melbourne Institute of Technology Act 1992 (No. 45 of 1992), and changed its name to RMIT University.

During the 1990s, the university underwent a rapid expansion and amalgamated with a number of nearby colleges and institutes. The Melbourne College of Decoration and Design joined RMIT in 1993, to create a new dedicated vocational design school, followed by the Melbourne College of Printing and Graphic Arts in 1995. That same year, it opened its first radial campus in Bundoora in the northern Melbourne metropolitan area. In 1999, it acquired the Melbourne Institute of Textiles campus in Brunswick in the inner-northern Melbourne metropolitan area for its vocational design schools.

=== Recent history (2000–present) ===
At the turn of the 21st century, it was invited by the Vietnamese Government to become the country's first foreign-owned university. Its first international branch campus opened in Ho Chi Minh City in 2001 with a second in Hanoi in 2004. In 2013, it established a presence in Europe by opening a centre in Barcelona, Spain.

== Campuses ==
=== Australia ===
==== Melbourne City ====
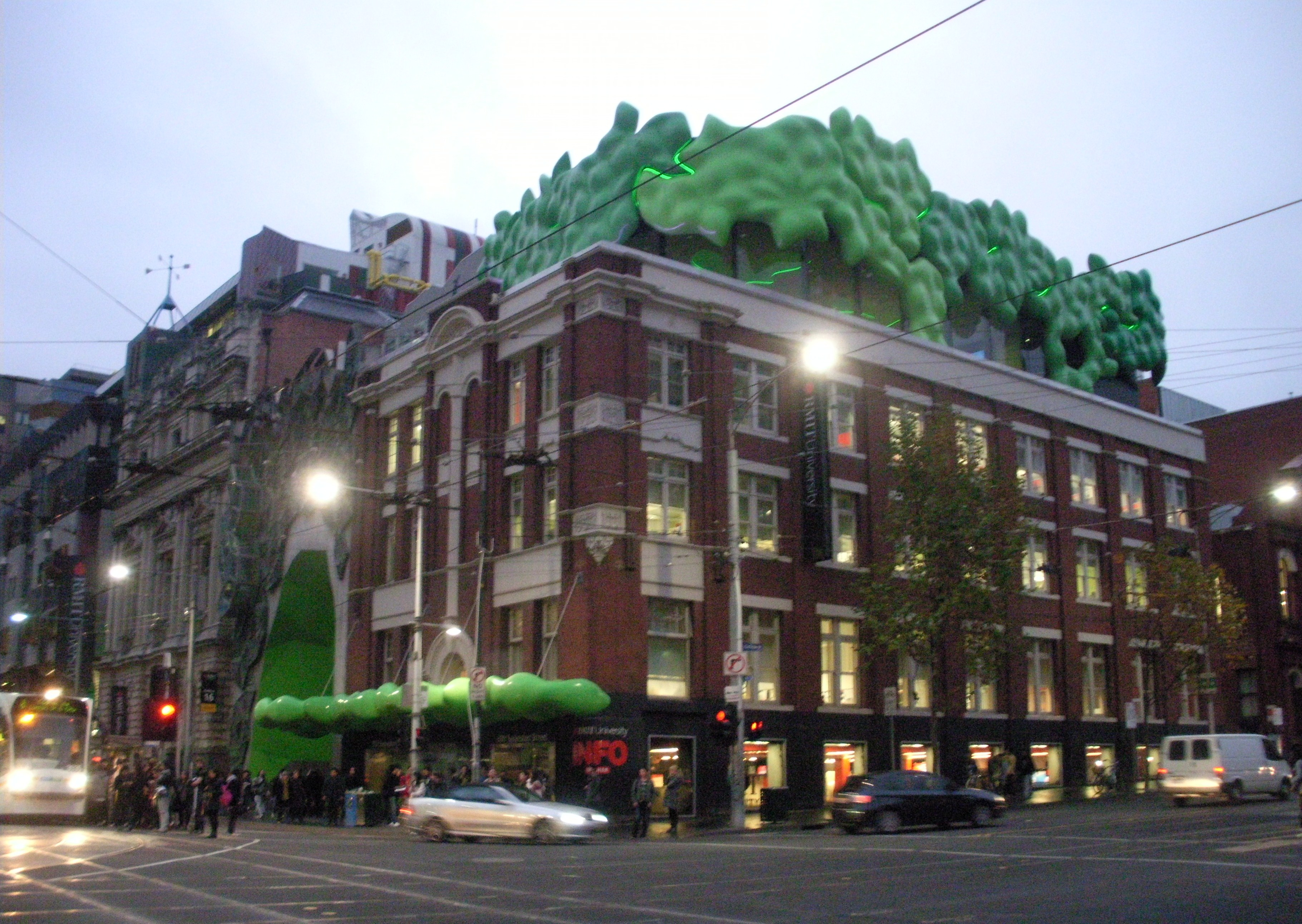
The "green brain" of Building 22 (Singer Building) on the Melbourne City campus

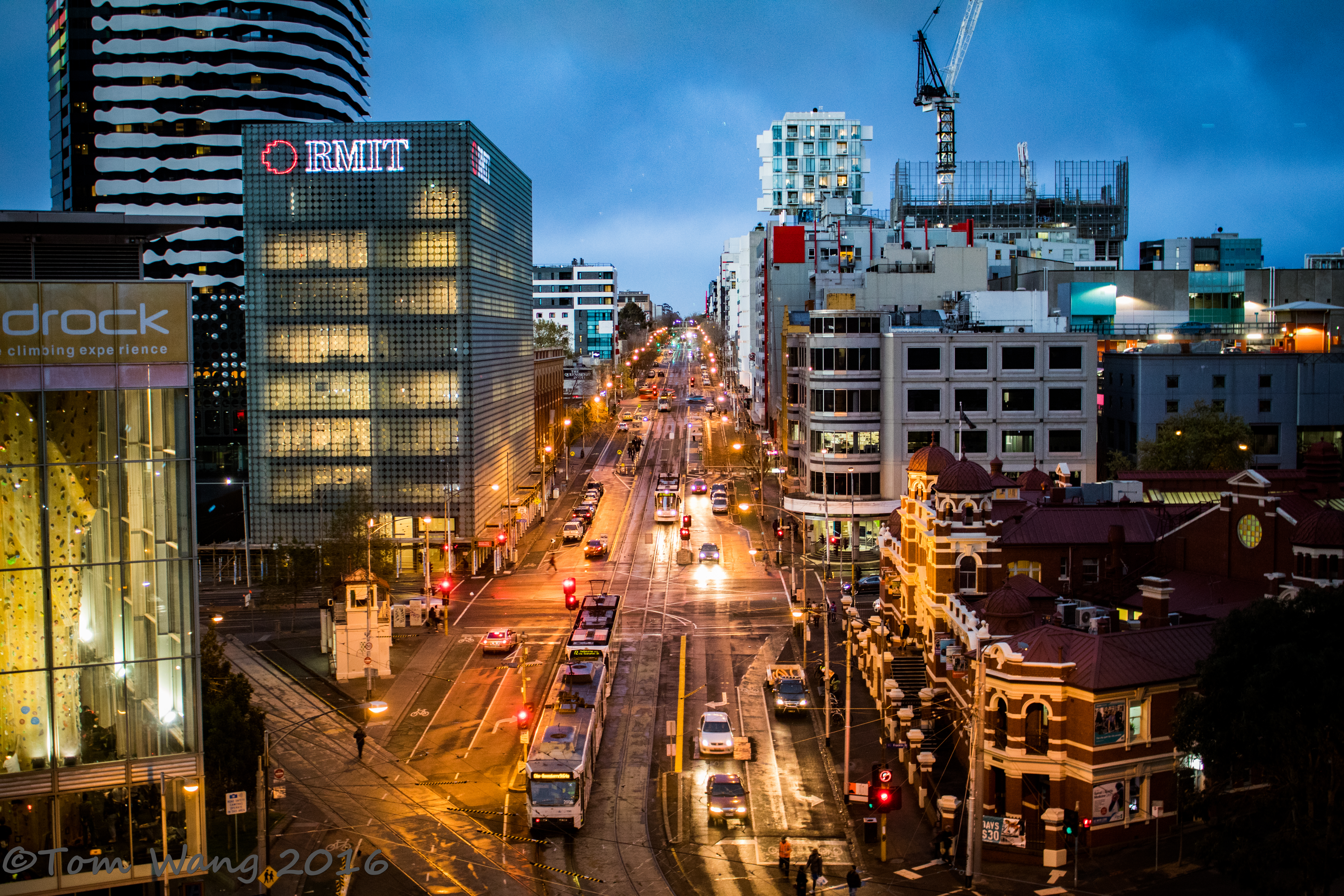
Design Hub building on the left, corner of Swanston and Victoria Streets

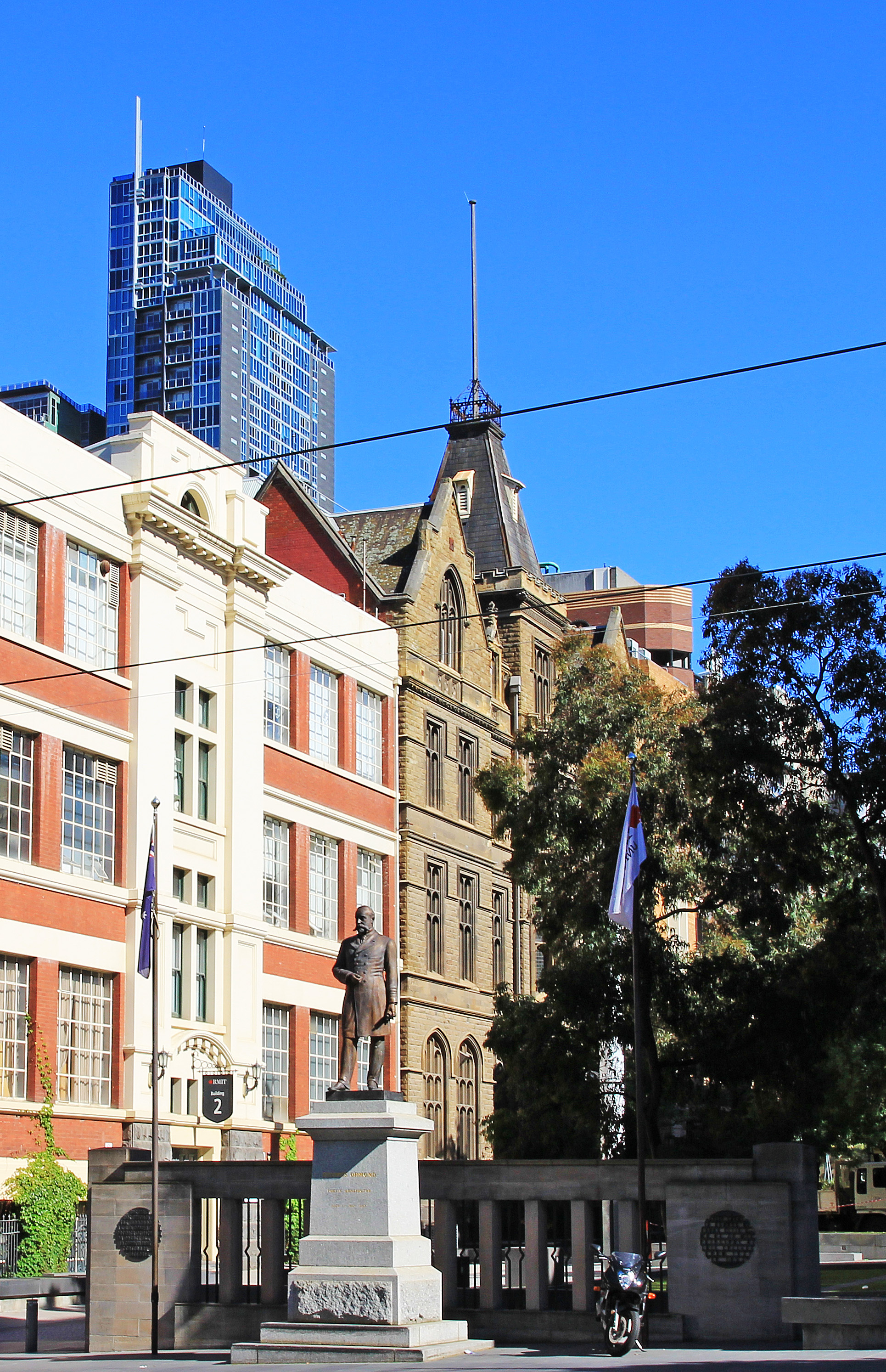
School of Art buildings on the Melbourne City campus

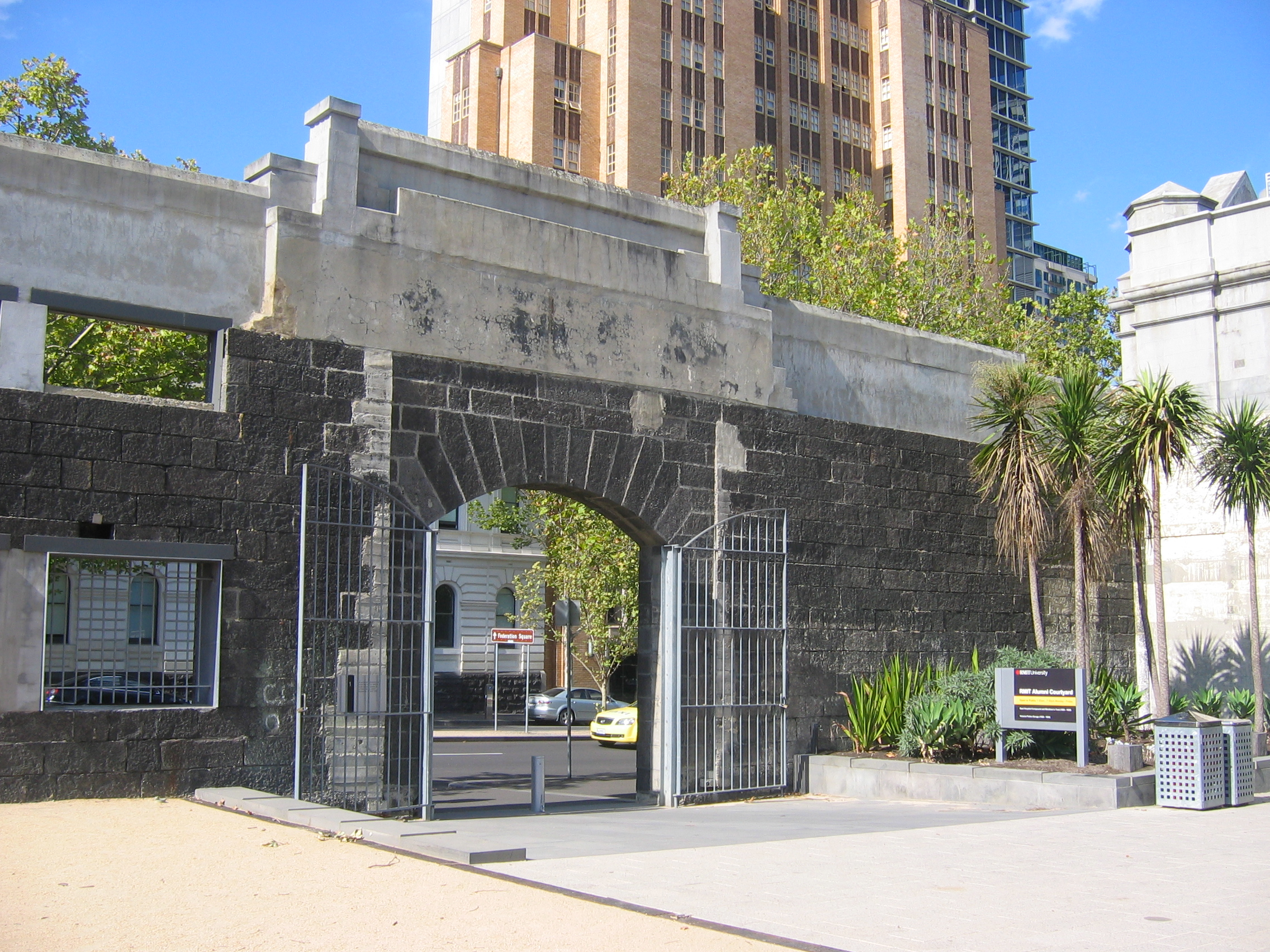
Alumni Courtyard was created from the ruins of the Old Melbourne Gaol

Located in the Melbourne city centre, the historic City campus of RMIT is the foundation campus of the university as well as its largest and most recognisable. It is known for its contemporary architecture as well as its preserved Victorian era and interwar period buildings.

Founded in 1887, the City campus began as the Working Men's College of Melbourne. Its original building is situated on the corner of Bowen Street and La Trobe Street, and the campus has since grown to 87 buildings in 2016. The campus has no perimeter walls. As such, its buildings are contiguous with the surrounding city. Most of its buildings are spread across six city blocks covering approximately 720,000 square metres (7,800,000 sq ft). It is roughly bound by La Trobe Street to the south, Elizabeth Street to the south-east and Swanston Street to the north-east (connected by Franklin Street), Queensberry Street to the north, Lygon Street to the north-west and Russell Street to the south-west. The campus area is situated between the two oldest sections of the city; the northern edge of the Hoddle Grid to its south and the Queen Victoria Market to its south-west. The area is sometimes referred to as the "RMIT quarter" of the city.

At the intersection of La Trobe Street and Swanston Street, the campus also benefits from its proximity to the State Library of Victoria as well as the adjacent Melbourne Central Shopping Centre and its City Loop underground railway station. It is also well-serviced by the city tram network along La Trobe Street and Swanston Street and has its own tram stop (Stop 7 RMIT University/Swanston Street) in the densest section of the campus.

The city block bound by Bowen Street, Franklin Street, La Trobe Street and Russell Street, served as the justice precinct of the city for over 100 years. While it is mostly occupied by campus buildings today, which were constructed over the site of the demolished Old Melbourne Gaol, some original buildings from the precinct remain and are used by the university. From the Old Melbourne Gaol, they include its east wing cell block (1854) which is now operated as a museum by the National Trust of Australia, its former chapel and gatehouse (1860) which are now used as a multi-faith place of worship for the campus, and the site of its former hospital which is now used as a landscaped space known as Alumni Courtyard. Other buildings from the precinct that remain are the former Melbourne City Watchhouse (1904) which is also operated as a museum by the National Trust, and the former Melbourne Magistrates' Court (1914) which is now used to house university administration.

Other notable buildings on the City campus include Storey Hall original section (1887), Forresters' Hall (1888), Capitol Theatre (1924), Emily McPherson College (1927), Building 8 (1993), Storey Hall annex (1995), Singer Building "green brain" (2010), Design Hub (2011) and Swanston Academic Building (2012).

==== Bundoora ====
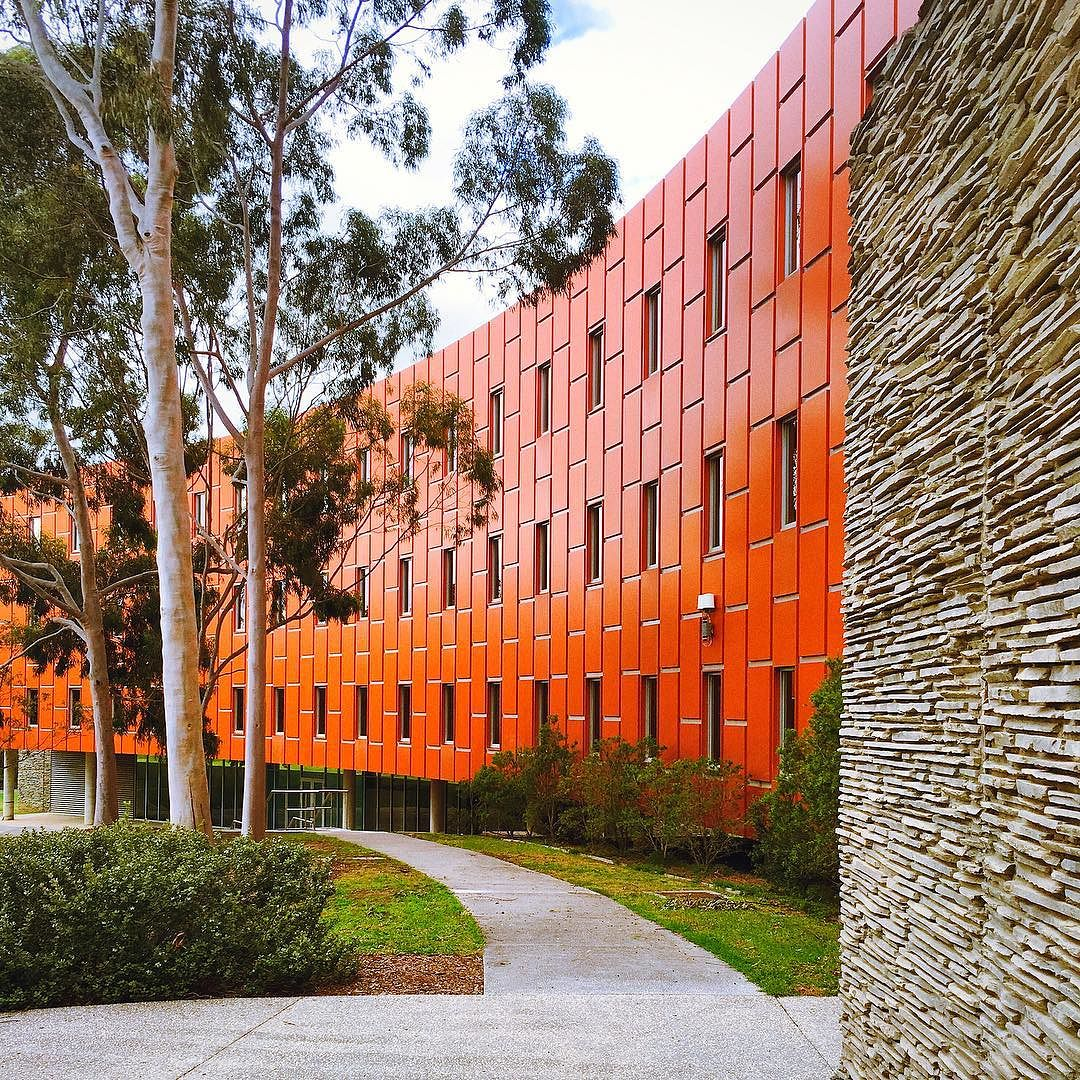
Building 220 on the Bundoora campus

The Bundoora campus was established in 1992. It is located 18 km from the City campus in the outer northern suburb of Bundoora. The campus is divided into 'East' and 'West' by Plenty Road. In a contrast to the urban City campus, the Bundoora West campus is set amongst almost 400,000 square metres (4,300,000 sq ft) of parkland.

Programs in aerospace engineering, electrical engineering, mechanical engineering, medical sciences and social sciences are offered at the Bundoora campus.

==== Brunswick ====
The Brunswick campus became a part of RMIT in 1999 as a dedicated site for its vocational design schools. It is located 6 km from the City campus in the inner northern suburb of Brunswick. Prior to its annexation by RMIT, it was the campus of the former Melbourne Institute of Textiles for nearly 50 years.

Programs in product design, fashion design, graphic design, printing, publishing and textiles are offered at the Brunswick campus.

==== Other sites ====
RMIT's flight training programs are conducted from its site at the Royal Australian Air Force's (RAAF) historic Williams base. It is located 20 km (12 mi) from the City campus in the outer south-western suburb of Point Cook. RAAF Williams is the world's oldest operating air force base and the birthplace of the Royal Australian Air Force.

The university also has a regional research site in the rural town of Hamilton. It is located 300 km west of the City campus in regional Victoria—just south of the Grampians National Park. The Potter Rural Community Research Centre at the site focuses on rural and regional issues in a global context.

RMIT Training also offers English Language Tests for Aviation or RELTA.

=== Asia ===
==== Ho Chi Minh City ====
In 1998, RMIT was invited by the Vietnamese Government to establish the country's first foreign-owned university. In 2001, it purchased and restored a 19th-century French Colonial building and grounds in District 3, Ho Chi Minh City. The building, located on Pham Ngoc Thach Street, is informally referred to as "the Castle" by students. Today, the Pham Ngoc Thach site remains a radial site of the present Ho Chi Minh City campus.

The present Ho Chi Minh City campus is located in the Phu My Hung area of the Saigon South development in District 7. The first academic buildings on the large purpose-built campus opened in 2005. In 2011, its recreation complex and residential centres opened.

==== Hanoi ====
The Hanoi campus was established in 2004. It was initially located in the Van Phuc Diplomatic Compound in the government precinct of the Ba Đình district, Hanoi. In 2007, it also acquired a building in the Đống Đa district to accommodate rising student numbers. It consolidated its two buildings in a newly built tower overlooking Ngọc Khánh Lake in the Ba Đình district in 2010.

==== Other partners ====
RMIT teaches and/or accredits programs for the Hong Kong Art School and Shanghai Institute of Foreign Trade in China, SIM Global Education in Singapore and Taylor's University in Malaysia.

=== Europe ===
==== Barcelona ====
In 2013, RMIT established a coordinating centre in Barcelona, Spain. The centre offers a variety of programs in conjunction with RMIT's partners in Europe, including a double master's degree in architecture which facilitates the RMIT School of Architecture and Design's participation in the reconstruction of Antoni Gaudí's basilica, Sagrada Família.

== Organisation and governance ==
Royal Melbourne Institute of Technology is a public university created under the Royal Melbourne Institute of Technology Act 1992 by the Government of Victoria, and continues in accordance with the Royal Melbourne Institute of Technology Act 2010.

The university trades under the name "RMIT University" which is a registered business name and trademark. It is composed of the academic colleges and schools, research centres and institutes of the Royal Melbourne Institute of Technology, and is governed by the RMIT Council and is managed by the RMIT Chancellery.

=== Divisions ===
RMIT University is separated into two divisions: the Higher Education Division and the Vocational Education and Training (VET) Division. The divisions are responsible for the 17 academic schools of RMIT—which are grouped into three academic portfolios referred to as colleges. The higher education schools offer undergraduate and postgraduate degrees, while the VET schools offer vocational certificates and diplomas.

=== Council ===
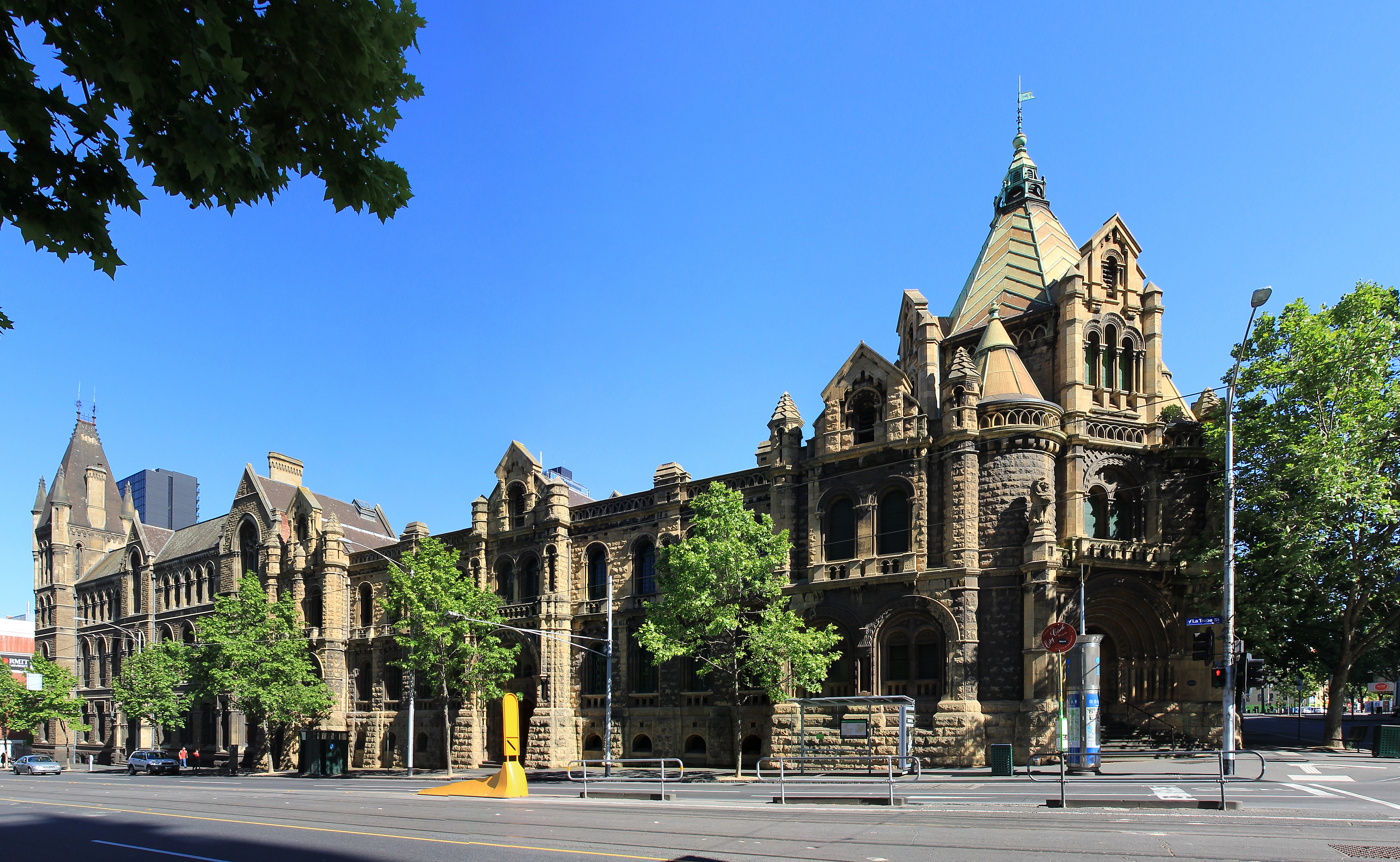
Building 1 (Francis Ormond Building), left, and Building 20 (Former Magistrates' Court), right, on the Melbourne City campus is home to the RMIT Chancellery

RMIT is governed by a council consisting of 21 members, which is responsible for the "general direction and superintendence of the University". The RMIT Council is led by the RMIT Chancellor who is an ex officio member and serves as its Governor-in-Council. The RMIT vice-chancellor and president, as well as the chair of the RMIT Academic Board, are also ex officio members of the council.

Five members of the RMIT Council are elected by direct ballot of the staff and students of the university. They consist of three staff members elected to represent the higher education, vocational education and general staff of the university, and two students elected to represent higher education and vocational education students. The remaining members are appointed directly by the RMIT Chancellor and Governor, or by a vote of the sitting council members. Members appointed directly to the council are required to possess a substantial expertise in academic or financial management, vocational education or training experience, and be drawn from beyond the university community.

==== Vice-chancellor ====
The RMIT Council grants power over all academic and administrative affairs of the university to the vice-chancellor and president—who is the chief executive officer of the university. The vice-chancellor and president is "responsible for the conduct of the University's affairs in all matters". Management of RMIT's colleges and portfolios is then delegated by the vice-chancellor and president to a team of deputy and pro vice-chancellors as well as senior executives.

=== Academic board ===
The requirements for the conferring of an academic degree of the university is determined and approved by the RMIT Academic Board. The board consists of the RMIT Chancellery as ex officio members, and up to a further 46 members—34 of which must be elected by staff and students. Those conferred an academic degree of the university may use the post-nominal letters "RMIT" with the abbreviation of their degree title.

=== Colleges and schools ===
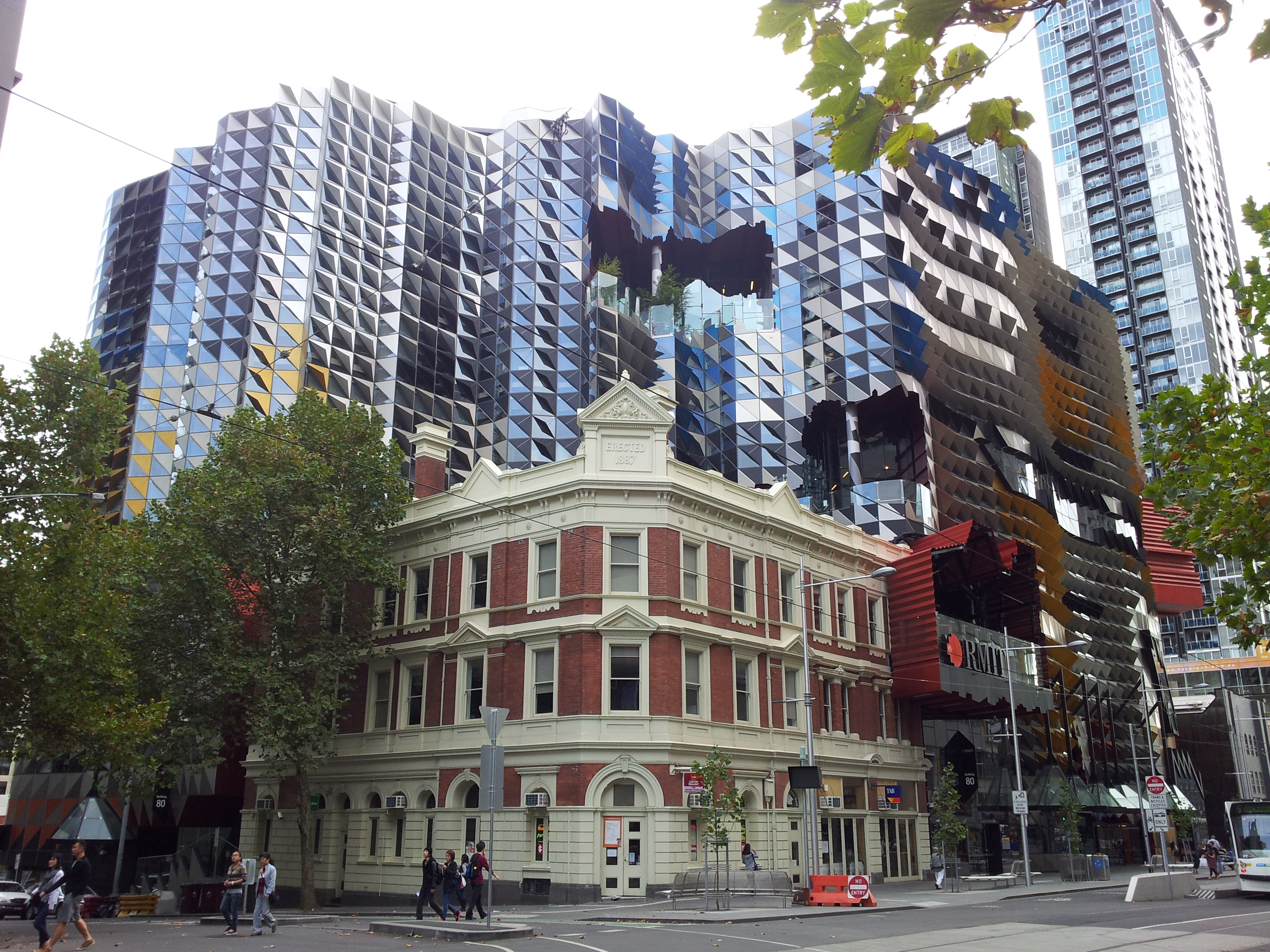
Building 80 (Swanston Academic Building) on the Melbourne City campus, home to the College of Business

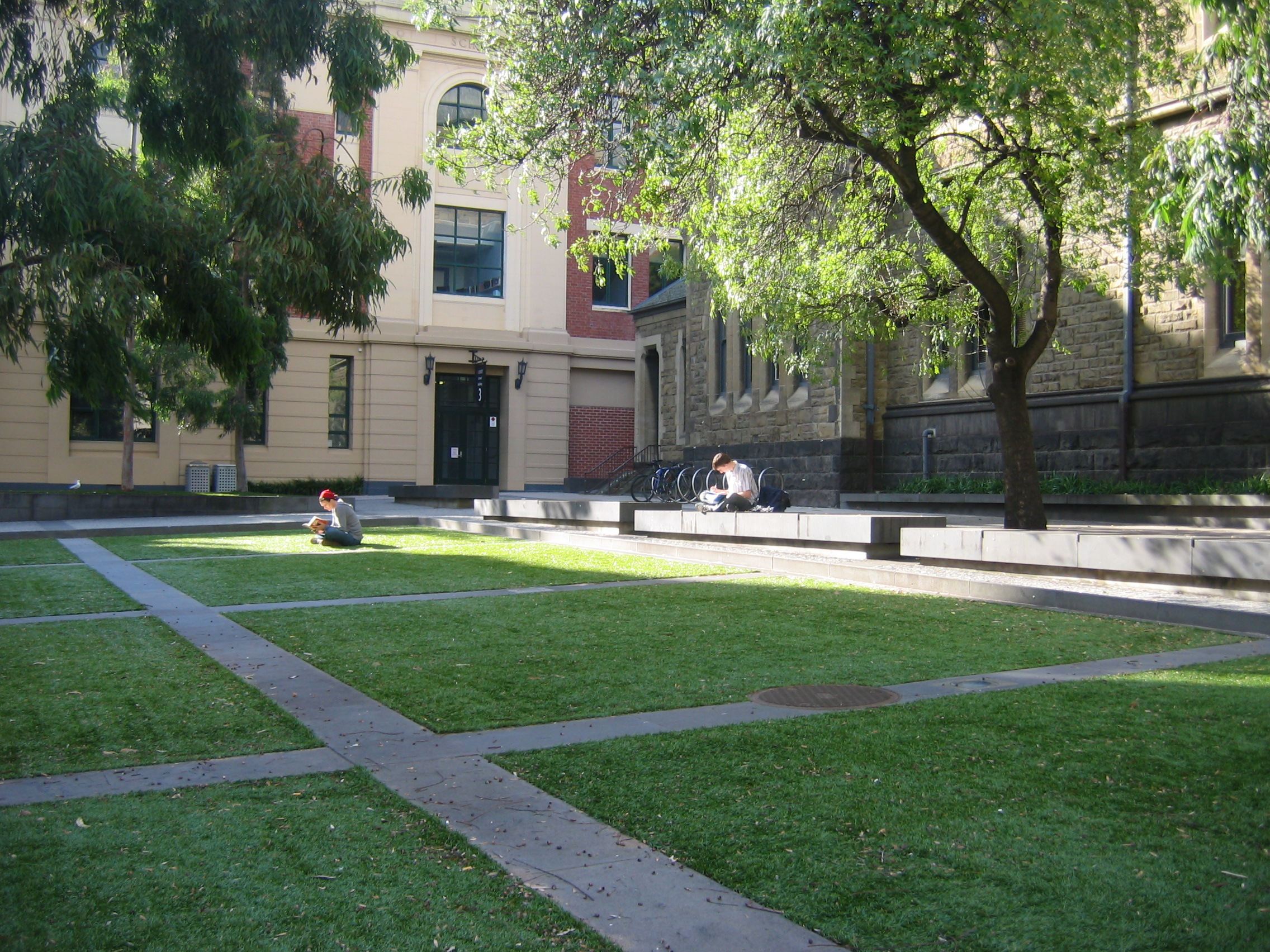
Building 1 (Francis Ormond Building) and Building 3 (Old Kernot Engineering School) on the Melbourne City campus

The four academic colleges housing the schools of RMIT are the College of Business and Law (BUSL), College of Design and Social Context (DSC) and College of Vocational Education and the STEM College (incorporating the fields of sciences, engineering, computing technologies and health and medical sciences (STEM).

College of Business and Law

- RMIT School of Accounting, Information Systems and Supply Chain
- RMIT School of Economics, Finance and Marketing
- RMIT School of Graduate Business and Law
- RMIT School of Management

College of Design and Social Context

- RMIT School of Architecture and Urban Design
- RMIT School of Art
- RMIT School of Design
- RMIT School of Education
- RMIT School of Fashion and Textiles
- RMIT School of Global, Urban and Social Studies
- RMIT School of Media and Communication
- RMIT School of Property, Construction and Project Management

STEM College

- RMIT School of Computing Technologies
- RMIT School of Engineering
- RMIT School of Health and Biomedical Sciences
- RMIT School of Science

College of Vocational Education incorporates the fields of business, design and technology, media, art and communication, social care, engineering technology, nursing, computer science, myotherapy, dental studies, trades and the built environment.

- RMIT School of Vocational Business Education
- RMIT School of Vocational Engineering, Health and Sciences

=== Commercial subsidiaries ===
"RMIT Group" is the business unit of the university and consists of the entities controlled by RMIT University, including wholly owned subsidiaries such as:

- RMIT Training, and its sub-entities, which as of 2020 include:
  - Informit (for online publication); which owns and operates the Informit database, the largest online database of research from across Australia and the Asia-Pacific;
  - RMIT University Press (trading as RMIT Publishing; for print publication); and
  - RMIT English Worldwide.

(RMIT Training owned a number of other subsidiaries between 1999 and 2009, but these have been either terminated or merged into the three remaining entities.)

As of 2013, international holdings companies included RMIT Spain (trading as RMIT Europe) and RMIT Vietnam, and there were other commercial interests and sub-entities. As of 2020, RMIT has two campuses in Vietnam and one in Spain.

== Academics ==
=== Academic reputation ===
University rankings

Global – Overall
- ARWU World: 301–400 (2025)
- CWTS World: 239 (Note: The CWTS Leiden Ranking is based on P (top 10%).) (2024)
- QS World: 125 (2026)
- QS Employability: 74 (2022)
- THE World: 251–300 (2026)
- USNWR Global: 198 (25/26)

National – Overall
- ARWU National: 14–20 (2025)
- CWTS National: 11 (2024)
- ERA National: 20 (2018)
- QS National: 10 (2026)
- THE National: 14–20 (2026)
- USNWR National: 14 (25/26)
- AFR National: =19 (2025)

In the 2024 Aggregate Ranking of Top Universities, which measures aggregate performance across the QS, THE and ARWU rankings, the university attained a position of #199 (14th nationally).

National publications

In the Australian Financial Review Best Universities Ranking 2025, the university was tied #19 amongst Australian universities.

Global publications

In the 2026 Quacquarelli Symonds World University Rankings (published 2025), the university attained a position of #125 (10th nationally).

In the Times Higher Education World University Rankings 2026 (published 2025), the university attained a position of #251–300 (tied 14–20th nationally).

In the 2025 Academic Ranking of World Universities, the university attained a position of #301–400 (tied 14–20th nationally).

In the 2025–2026 U.S. News & World Report Best Global Universities, the university attained a position of #198 (14th nationally).

In the CWTS Leiden Ranking 2024, the university attained a position of #239 (11th nationally).

=== Student outcomes ===
The Australian Government's QILT (Note: Abbreviation for Quality Indicators for Learning and Teaching.) conducts national surveys documenting the student life cycle from enrolment through to employment. These surveys place more emphasis on criteria such as student experience, graduate outcomes and employer satisfaction than perceived reputation, research output and citation counts.

In the 2023 Employer Satisfaction Survey, graduates of the university had an overall employer satisfaction rate of 84.7%.

In the 2023 Graduate Outcomes Survey, graduates of the university had a full-time employment rate of 71.8% for undergraduates and 98% for postgraduates. The initial full-time salary was A$66,800 for undergraduates and A$98,000 for postgraduates.

In the 2023 Student Experience Survey, undergraduates at the university rated the quality of their entire educational experience at 73.9% meanwhile postgraduates rated their overall education experience at 77.9%.

=== Research ===
RMIT focuses on applied research as well as outcome-related research and consultancy services, and has extensive partnerships with government and industry. It mainly focuses its research in the areas of design, technology, health, globalisation and sustainability.

Its Portfolio of Research and Innovation operates on a similar scale to its colleges, and also contains a specialist research school in order to foster excellence in research methodology and pedagogy. In addition to the Portfolio of Research and Innovation, over 50 research centres operate independently within RMIT's colleges and schools as well as a large number of smaller research groups.

== Collections ==
=== Libraries ===
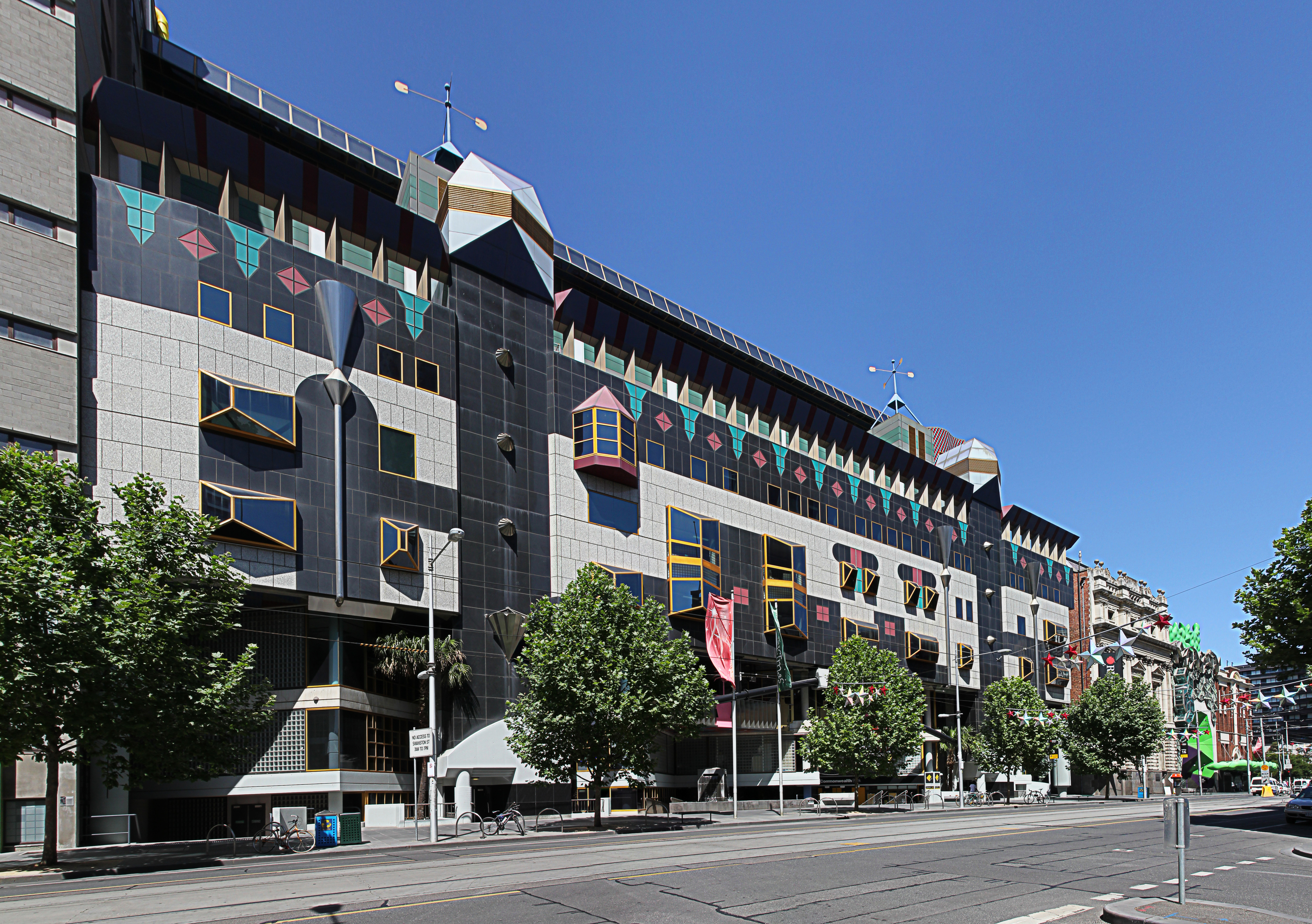
Swanston Library is located in Building 8 on the Melbourne City campus

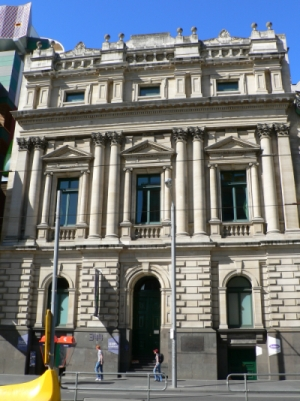
RMIT Gallery and First Site Gallery are housed in the historic section of Storey Hall on the Melbourne City campus

RMIT Library is the central libraries network of the university. It has four locations across RMIT's three Australian campuses. Swanston Library is the largest in the network, and is located in Building 8 at the City campus. Swanston Library is also reported to be amongst the top five libraries in all of Melbourne. Other libraries in the network are the Brunswick Library, Bundoora West Library and Carlton Library (the latter of which is also at the City campus).

The City campus also benefits from its proximity to the State Library of Victoria—the central public reference library and the largest library in Melbourne.

In addition to its libraries network, RMIT schools also maintain their own specialised collections. Notable examples of school-maintained collections are the AFI Research Collection, RMIT Design Archives and National Aerospace Resource.

Two libraries are located at RMIT's Vietnam campuses; Beanland Library and Hanoi Library. The Beanland Library is the larger of the two libraries, and is located at the Ho Chi Minh City campus.

==== Online databases ====
Selected research of RMIT academics and postgraduate students can be accessed through the RMIT Research Repository—an open access database of peer-reviewed published articles, conference papers, books and chapters, etc. Documents held by the RMIT Research Repository are also indexed by Google Scholar, National Library of Australia and WorldCat. As of March 2013, there are more than 19,000 records in the Repository.

The university's subsidiary, RMIT Training, also owns and operates the Informit online library database, which is the largest database of research from across Australia and the Asia-Pacific.

=== Galleries ===
The major public art gallery of the university is RMIT Gallery, located at the City campus. The gallery runs a highly regarded program of Australian and international exhibitions, and focuses on contemporary art, design and visual culture. It is located in the historic original section of Storey Hall on Swanston Street and is considered to be one of Melbourne's most vibrant art galleries. The gallery also publishes widely on art and design research in partnership with RMIT Publishing.

RMIT First Site Gallery at the City campus is the main gallery of the RMIT Link campus union, and focuses on emerging artists and is located beneath RMIT Gallery. The campus union also manages the Artland program at the Brunswick campus. Artland consists of 16 sites around the campus and Brunswick streets showcasing work of design students.

In addition to the Story Hall galleries, many of RMIT's schools also manage their own discipline-relevant galleries. Examples are the School of Art's main gallery and Project Space / Spare Room Gallery, the School of Media and Communication's Field36 Gallery, and the School of Architecture and Design's Virtual Reality Centre and Design Hub Gallery. The public art program of the School of Art also produces art in public spaces around RMIT's campuses as well as the greater Melbourne city centre and metropolitan area.

==== Art collection ====
RMIT Gallery is the caretaker of RMIT's permanent art collection. It includes the substantial Linsday Edward Collection of fine art and W. E. Macmillan Collection of gold and silver as well as a number of other sub-collections. The Linsday Edwards Collection has a strong focus on Australian art and holds work by leading Australian artists (including RMIT alumni or former faculty) such as Howard Arkley, John Brack, Leonard French, Roger Kemp, Inge King, Max Meldrum, John Olsen, Lenton Parr and Fred Williams.

A history of the art collection is documented in the publication A Skilled Hand and Cultivated Mind: A Guide to the Architecture and Art of RMIT.

== Student life ==
=== Link (campus union) ===
RMIT Link is the university's campus union. It exists to sponsor and promote social, cultural, educational, sporting and recreational programs and activities among the RMIT community, and to provide such facilities and services at RMIT's Australian campuses. Link is separated into two divisions: Arts & Culture and Sports & Recreation. It is a controlled entity under the authority of RMIT's Council.

Arts & Culture manages a number of extra-curricular arts collectives. It also offers workshop and seminars as well as funding for arts initiatives, and runs a free cinema program at the City and Bundoora campuses.

Sports & Recreation manages the university's semi-professional sports teams, which are collectively known as the Redbacks, and has an elite athlete funding program. It offers funding for community and social sports clubs on RMIT's Australian campuses, and also runs community and charity sporting events and tournaments. It also operates the City campus gym, and co-owns a ski lodge on Mount Buller.

=== RUSU (student union) ===
RMIT's University Student Union (RUSU) is the independent body representing students enrolled at RMIT. It was founded in 1944 by John Storey Jr., after whom Storey Hall at the City campus is named. The objective of RUSU is to safeguard the interests and rights of students, and to advance education, welfare, social life and cultural activities of students. RUSU has a number of departments advocating various elements of student life, and it also supports academic, cultural, political, spiritual and special interest clubs and societies run by students.

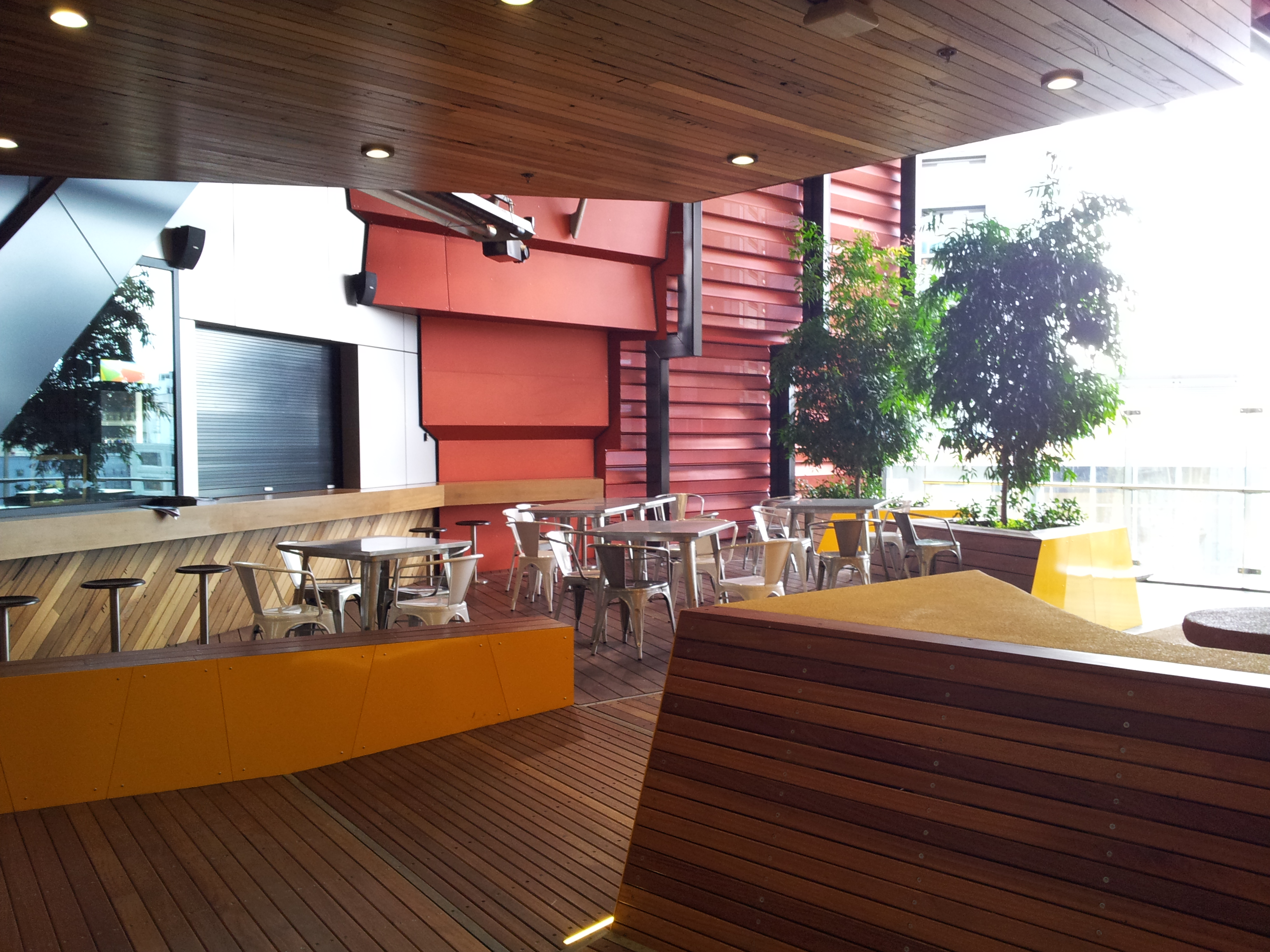
Café in Building 80 (Swanston Academic Building) on the Melbourne City campus

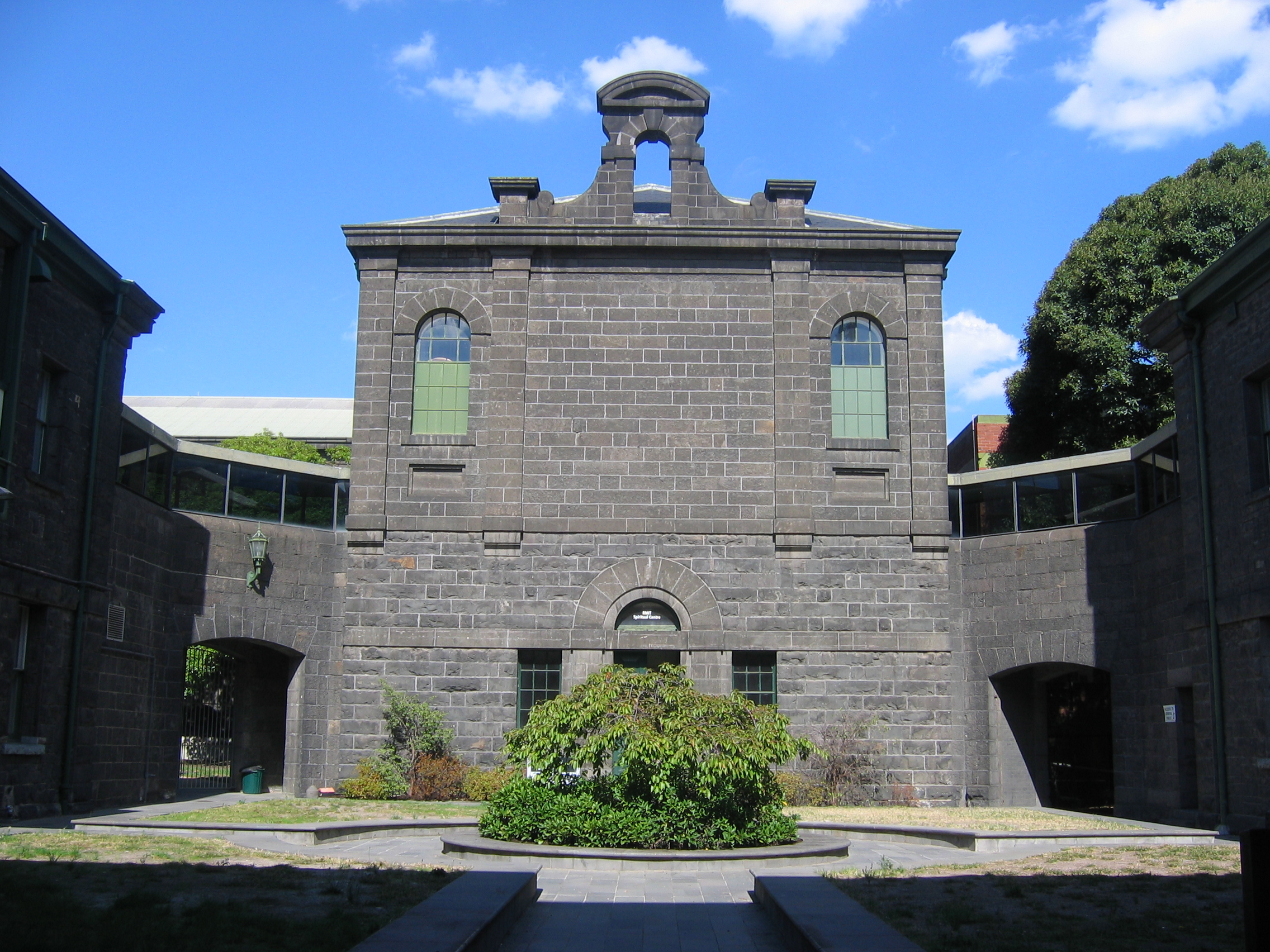
Spiritual Centre on the Melbourne City campus

Departments:

- Activities – manages events, festivals, markets and parties on all RMIT's campuses
- Campuses – representation of students on general matters relating to RMIT's campuses
- Clubs and societies
- Education – campaigns on education matters and is run in collaboration with other departments
- Environment – advocates environmental responsibility and sustainability on RMIT's campuses
- International Students – supports and advocates the rights of international students
- Postgraduate Students – the representative body of postgraduate students
- Queer – supports and advocates the rights of RMIT's LGBT community
- Women's – supports and advocates the rights of women
- Realfoods – RUSU's organic fair trade vegetarian cafe, located in the main cafeteria at the City campus

Student media:

- The Swanston Gazette – Student newspaper established in 2019 by the RMIT Journalism Society as an independent alternative unaffiliated with the university or student union.
- Catalyst – Student magazine, distributed free every month of the academic year since 1944
- RMITV – student television production company, broadcasting since 1987, and co-founder of the C31 community television station
- Student Youth Network (SYN) – student radio station, broadcasting across the Melbourne metropolitan area on 90.7 FM and on DAB+. Though many RMIT students participate in SYN programs, it is wholly independent of both RMIT and RUSU organisationally
- 3RRR – RMIT's former radio station, founded as 3RMT in 1976, now independently funded but still used by the university

=== Accommodation ===
RMIT operates several student accommodation facilities including: RMIT Village, Cambridge Court and College Square on the City campus and Walert House on the Bundoora campus—all of which operate as self-catered apartment complexes. Twelve other student hostels are also operated by other providers.

Some of the traditional residential colleges of the nearby University of Melbourne also reserve places for RMIT students. The college fees include all catering, utilities, academic and pastoral support. The colleges affiliated with RMIT include: International House, Janet Clarke Hall, Newman College, Queen's College, St Mary's College, University College and Whitley College.

=== Student demographics ===
In 2014, RMIT's program enrollments by gender were 54% male and 46% female. RMIT's Higher Education student body was 52% male and 48% female while its Vocational Educational student body was 53% male and 47% female. According to a study of over 100 RMIT STEM graduates, male RMIT University STEM graduates outnumber females by 7 to 1.

=== Spiritual Centre ===
RMIT's Spiritual Centre is a multi-faith place of worship located on the City campus. It is housed in the historic Old Melbourne Gaol chapel, built in 1860. The centre provides a contemplative space to all staff and students of RMIT, regardless of their faith and without showing favour to any one faith, and houses the RMIT Chaplaincy services. RMIT has chaplains that represent Buddhist, Christian, Jewish and Muslim faiths of various branches as well as for Integral spirituality.

== People ==
RMIT graduates are considered to be some of the most employable in the world. In a 2011 survey of 5000 employers by Quacquarelli Symonds, RMIT was ranked 51st in the world for graduate employability. In 2011, the university had an alumni community of around 280,000 graduates in 130 countries.

Notable attendees and graduates include: Australian skier and Winter Olympic gold medalist Lydia Lassila; Irish Australian rules footballer and charity worker Jim Stynes; Australian film director and writer James Wan; Australian actor Travis Fimmel (attended); Australian sportsman and three-time Olympic gold medalist James Tomkins; Australian comedian and television host Rove McManus; Australian singer and guitarist of the band Wolfmother, Andrew Stockdale; Australian singer Judith Durham; Vietnamese actress, model and beauty pageant titleholder, 2006 Miss Vietnam, Mai Phương Thúy; Australian documentary maker John Safran; Australian artist Charles Billich; Australian animator Felix Colgrave; director of photography, Shekhar Bhansali division director in Electrical, Communication and Cyber Systems (ECCS) at the National Science Foundation, Greig Fraser, director of the Omani Society for Fine Arts, Maryam Al Zadjali and entrepreneur and CEO of NeXgen Global Group Hemi Hossain.

=== Graduation traditions ===
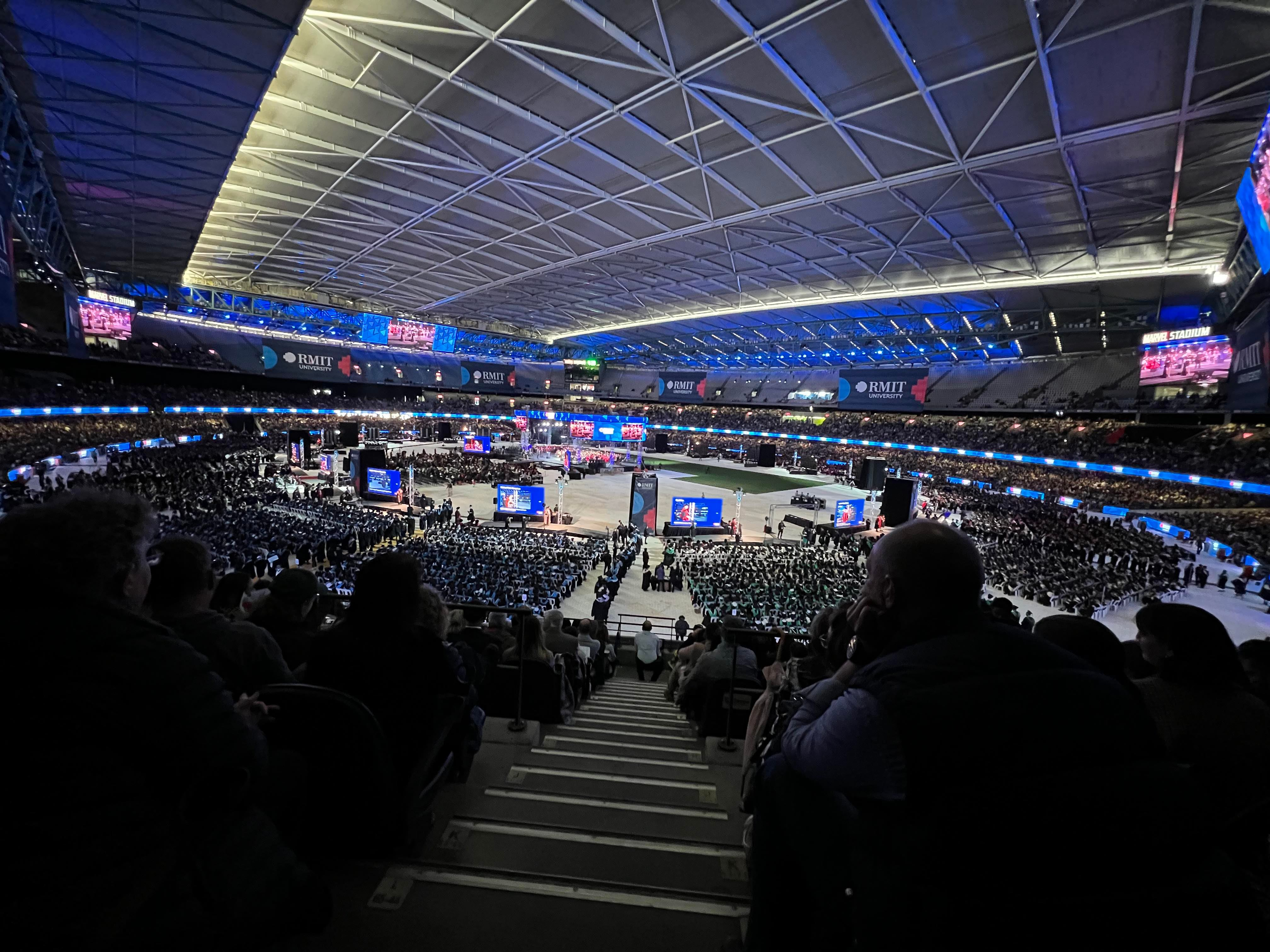
Graduation ceremony of RMIT University in 2022 at Docklands Stadium

A notable graduation tradition of RMIT is its graduation parade. The parade is town and gown-style academic procession which proceeds from the City campus down the major city thoroughfare of Swanston Street to Federation Square (until 2002 the parade culminated outside the Melbourne Town Hall). Graduands and faculty march in full academic regalia and receive a military escort from the central marching band of the Royal Australian Air Force. The parade is welcomed at Federation Square by the Lord Mayor of Melbourne—on behalf of the city and its citizens. The mayor grants RMIT's vice-chancellor a "writ of passage" to proceed with the graduation ceremony, which takes place at the Docklands Stadium.

== See also ==
- List of universities in Australia
