= Old Physics Conference Room and Gallery =

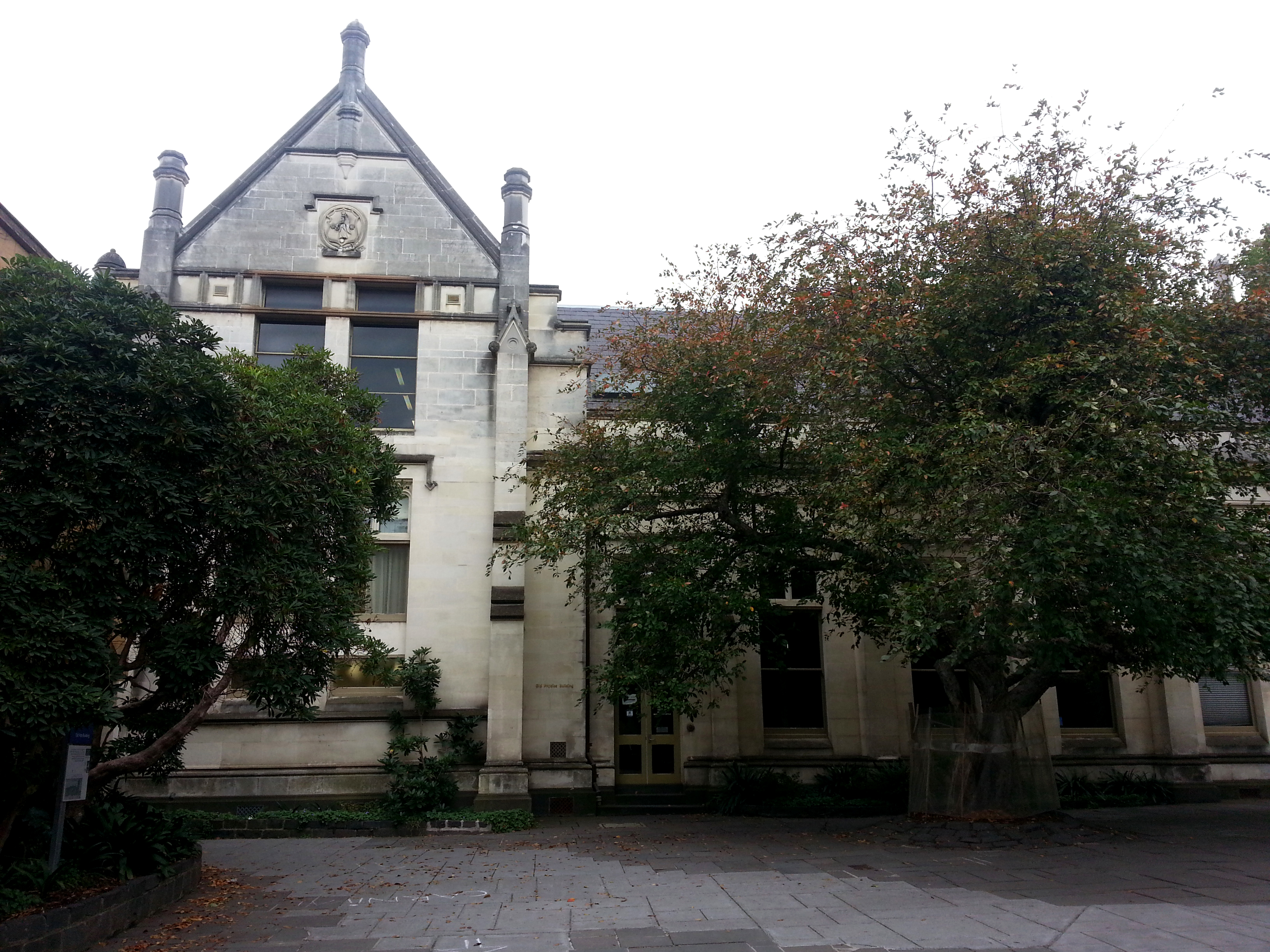
- Front view of Old Physics Conference Room and Gallery
- Alternative names: Building 128

General information
- Status: Completed
- Type: Educational
- Architectural style: Collegiate Gothic style; Victorian Academic Gothic
- Location: 152-292 Grattan Street, The University of Melbourne, Parkville Campus, Melbourne, Victoria, Australia
- Coordinates: 37°47′50″S 144°57′38″E
- Construction started: 1886
- Completed: 1938
- Opened: 1889 (as the Physics Building)
- Renovated: 1923
- Owner: The University of Melbourne

Technical details
- Structural system: Buttressed stone walls
- Material: Stone; Square headed windows; Turreted gable end; Slate roof
- Floor count: 2

Design and construction
- Architects: Joseph Reed, Anketell Henderson and Francis Smart (1886–1889); E. Evan Smith; Percy Edgar Everett
- Architecture firm: Reed, Henderson and Smart; Victoria Public Works Department

Victorian Heritage Register
- Official name: Old Physics Conference Room and Gallery
- Type: State heritage (built)
- Designated: 23 June 1992
- Reference no.: 915
- Significance: Registered
- Category: Education

The Old Physics Conference Room and Gallery is a university teaching and art gallery located at 156-292 Grattan Street, The University of Melbourne, Parkville Campus, Melbourne, Victoria, Australia.

Built between 1886 and 1889, the building formerly housed the School of Natural Philosophy and was designed in the Collegiate Gothic style by Reed, Henderson, and Smart, one of the most prominent architectural firms at that time to accommodate the new phase of science schools in the late nineteenth century. The building is considered one of important key buildings in demonstrating the increasing importance of scientific teaching and research in the late nineteenth century in Australia. The building was listed on the Victorian Heritage Register on 23 June 1992.

== Historical and cultural significance ==
Planning of a new building for Natural Philosophy began in 1886. In the 1880s, the burst in capital grant supported the cost of construction. Prior to this date, the foundation Professor of Natural Philosophy, Henry Andrew, used the rooms in Quadrangle for teaching.

Designed by Reed, Henderson and Smart, teaching laboratories were introduced in the design. This latest addition in the building exposed students to self-laboratory exercises and experiments. It became a key building, demonstrating Australia's education reforms towards research. Built in several stages, the construction was supervised by Professor Thomas Lyle, Professor Andrew's successor. The first stage started in 1889 consisted of a huge raked lecture theatre. The second stage continued in 1891 but was demolished in 1975 in order to accommodate Deakin Court. The construction was then supervised by Professor T. H. Laby after Professor Lyle retired in 1914, completing Reed, Henderson and Smart's design.

Starting from 1889, the north-eastern wing was built. Designed by Public Works Department, it was added to the old complex. In 1923, the new wing was designed to "simulate the external façade of the original design". In the mid-1940s, it was demolished as part of the university's master planning.

Under supervision of Professor T. H. Laby, the Commonwealth Adviser in Radium, 1938, the entire complex was raised into two-storeys and renovated by Percy Edgar Everett, chief architect of Public Works Department to accommodate Commonwealth X-ray and radium laboratory. The new cream brick wing was the latest addition in 1938 after it was opened in 1939.

The building was listed on the Victorian Heritage Register on 23 June 1992.

== Influences ==
Neo-Gothic architecture heavily influenced college buildings in the nineteenth century. Reed, Henderson and Smart design relates back to the Old Arts building by Francis White. The Great Depression in 1891 put the construction to a temporary stop after Marvellous Melbourne, due to lack of funds and a huge fraud by the University registrar, L. F. Dickson. The design was also influenced by the rise in the colony's education reform in teaching methodology and new fields of study. More teaching laboratories were included in the design. "The period of 1880s was the radical advance in orienting university towards research-based education."

The sewage system played an important role in the building placement. In early stages of the university development, there were no constructed services. Water was collected from the roofs of Quadrangle and waste in cesspools. Due to bad sewer system, the Melbourne City Council had forbidden cesspools in 1867 and replaced with the night-cart system. Eventually, iron receiver tanks were installed to store the wastes beyond the Quadrangle before the proper sewer system was completed. Gothic-style architecture remained the architecture of choice until the twentieth century.

== Description ==
=== Old Physics Conference Centre ===
The Old Physics Conference Centre is a two-storey neo-Gothic style building divided into two wings. The building housed a lecture theatre, laboratory, workshop and apparatus room. Its building elevation consists of buttressed stone walls, square headed windows and turreted gable ends. The roof has a steep pitch covered with slates.

=== Natural Philosophy extension ===
The redevelopment and extension of Natural Philosophy was handled by Professor Laby. It defers in colour and style to the adjacent Union House with its Collegiate Gothic styling. Finely carved freestone details above the north entrance further enhance its design. The steel-framed windows give an impression of its ambition towards modern architecture.

=== Deakin Court ===
Following the 1970 Master Plan, the 1891 section of Old Physics was torn down, and the interior of the remaining section of Old Physics is currently used as the University Art Gallery and conference rooms for university administration. On the north side of Old physics, architects Daryl Jackson and Evan Walker introduced an abstracted and cement-rendered version of a double-storey cloister, and a linkage to the Natural Philosophy extension. Currently covered in ivy, this is one of the first successful adaptations of an existing nineteenth century building on campus.

== Gallery ==
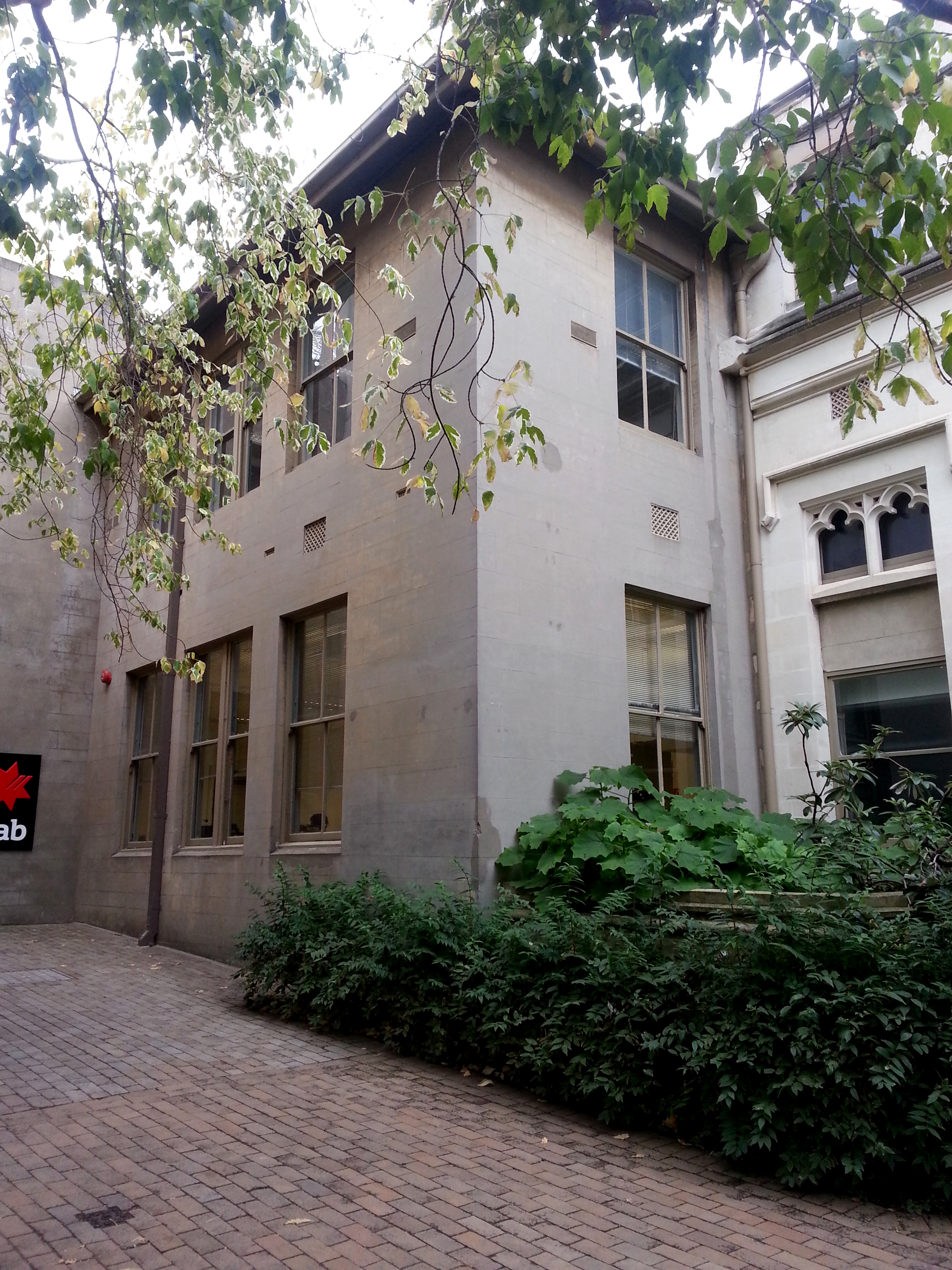
1938 west wing cream brick extension

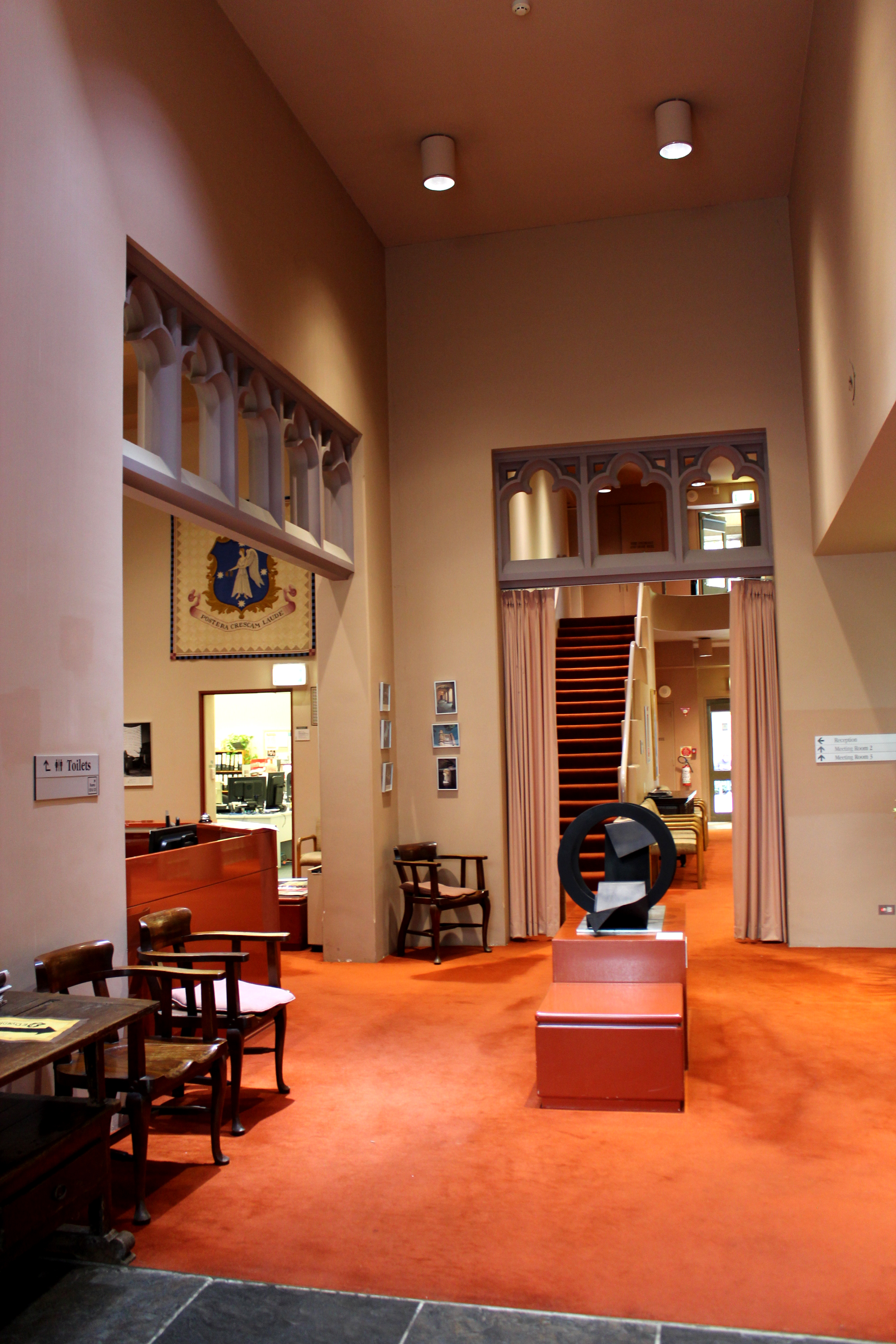
1938 two-storey building refurbishment

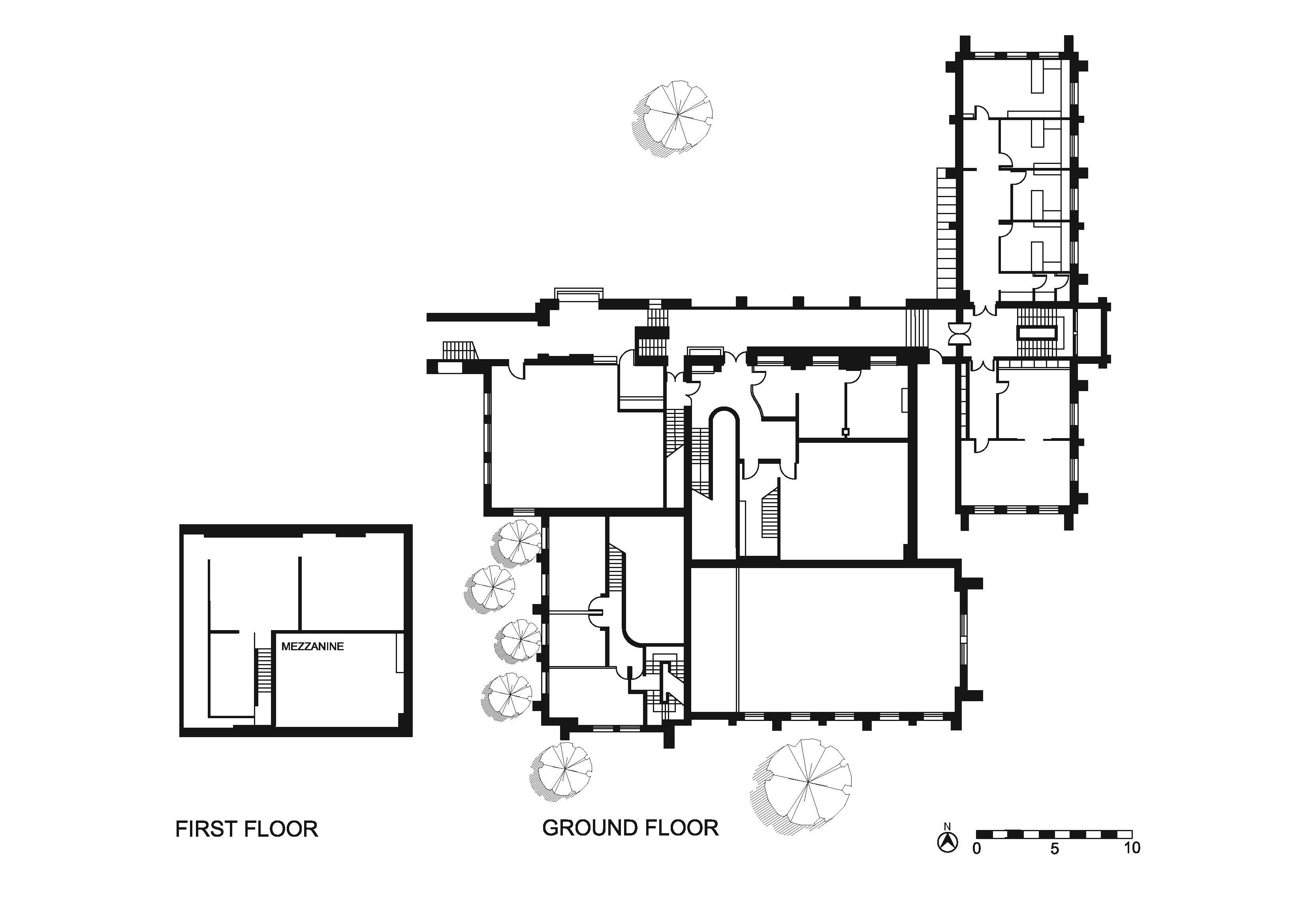
Ground floor plan

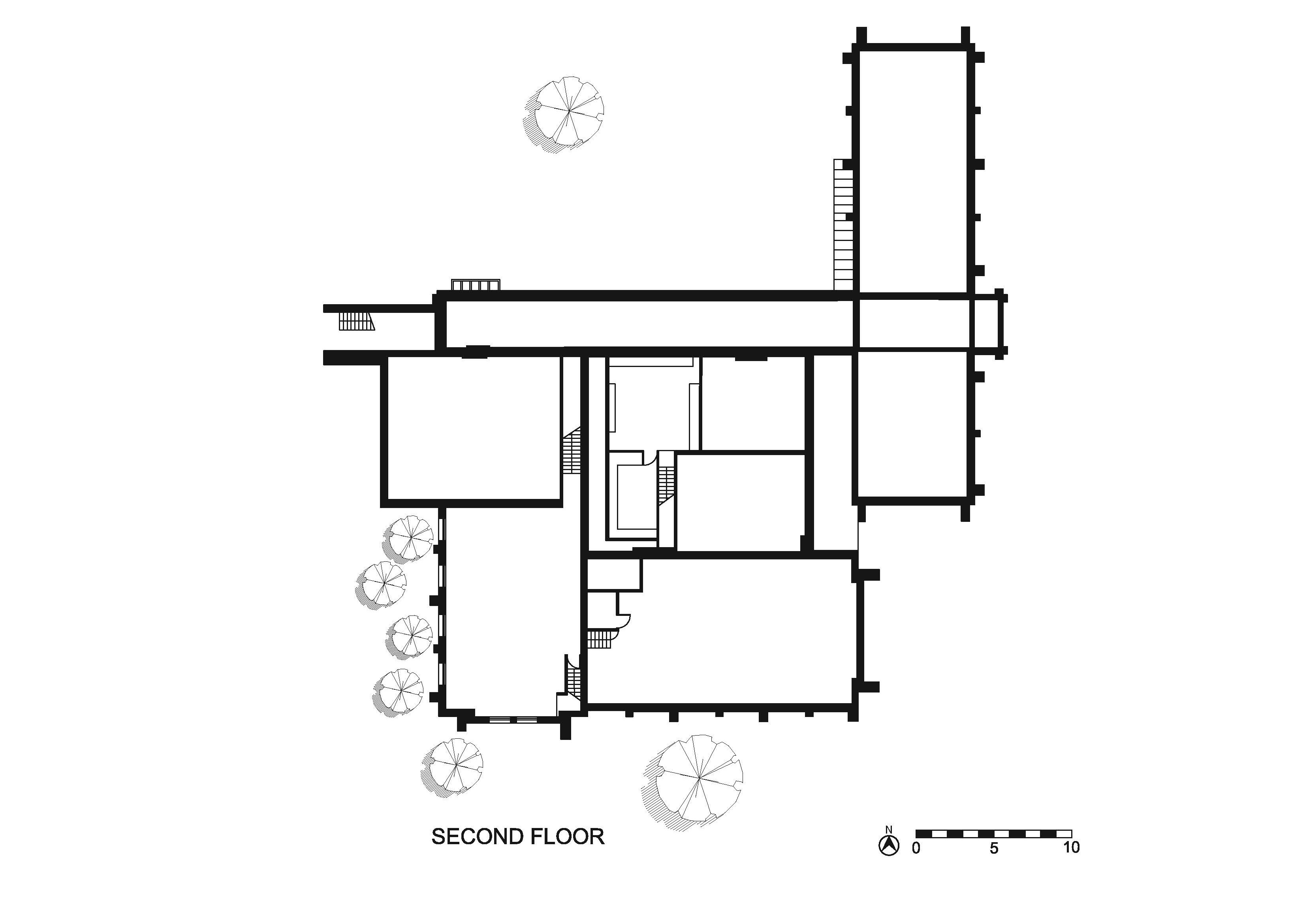
Second floor plan

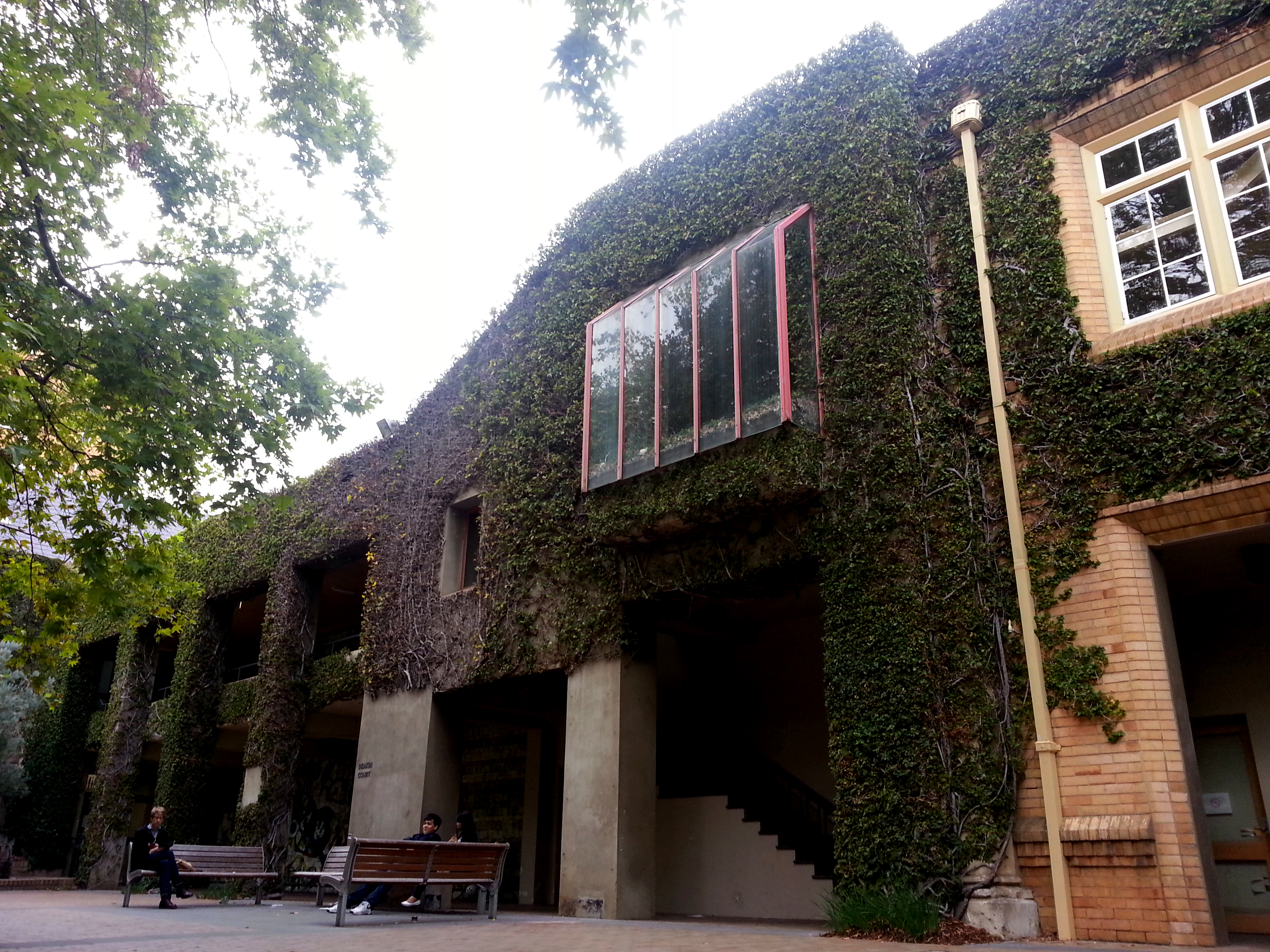
Deakin Court
