= Frank Tate Building =

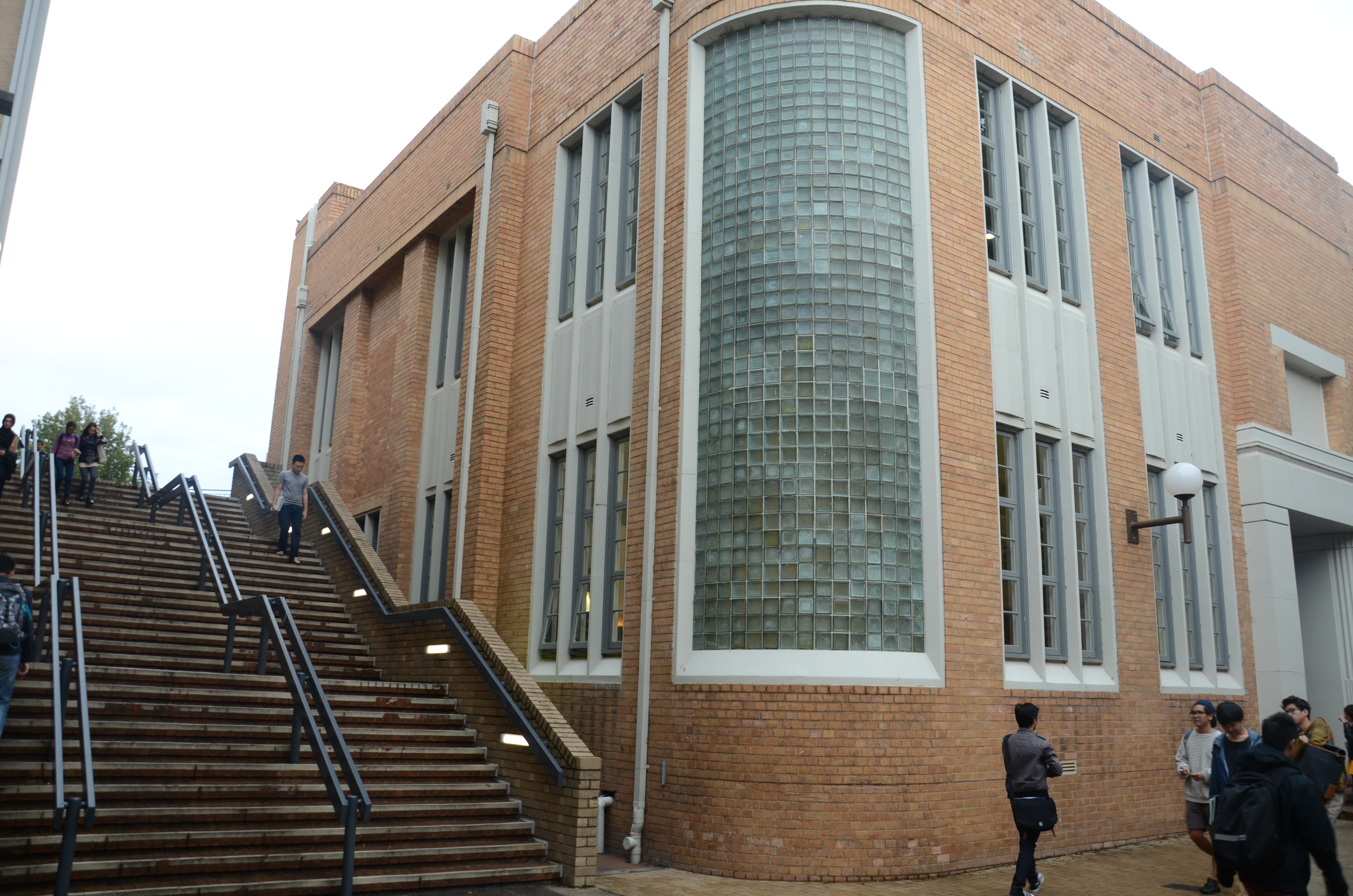
- Frank Tate Building, south view, April 2013
- Interactive map of the Frank Tate Building area
- Alternative names: Building 189
- Etymology: Frank Tate CMG (Director of Education, Victoria, 1902–1928)

General information
- Status: Completed
- Type: Academic administration
- Architectural style: Art Deco
- Location: Off Swanston Street, University of Melbourne, Parkville Campus, Melbourne, Victoria, Australia
- Coordinates: 37°47′58″S 144°57′48″E
- Completed: 1940
- Client: Melbourne Teachers' College
- Owner: University of Melbourne

Technical details
- Material: Concrete; bricks; glass bricks

Design and construction
- Architect: Percy Edgar Everett

Renovating team
- Architect: Cox Architecture

The Frank Tate Building, also known as Building 189, is a student centre of the University of Melbourne, Parkville Campus, Melbourne, Victoria, Australia. Designed by Percy Edgar Everett, it was built between 1939 and 1940 as an expansion of the Melbourne Teachers' College, housed in the '1888 Building' to the south. In 1994 the Melbourne Teachers' College relocated and the building became part of the main Melbourne University Parkville Campus. In 2010 it was refurbished as a learning centre by Cox Architecture, designed to allow a multitude of different user groups to configure the space according to their individual requirements.

== Architecture ==
Designed by Percy Everett in his capacity as Chief Architect of the Victorian Public Works Department as a notable example of the Art Deco style, the building combines horizontal massing (now obscured by the raised north plaza), with details emphasising the vertical, all in cream brick with pale cream painted rendered detailing. The T-shaped plan is broad at the south end, where the windows are grouped vertically in panels featuring narrow almost Tudor vertical ribbing, similar to the earlier Chemistry Building, also by Everett, and bold curved glass brick corners. The long north wing has a semi-circular end, and is subdivided by projecting vertical piers, like stylised Gothic buttresses.

The ground floor consists of main study areas, the Performing Arts Studio, Learning Environments Special Labs, and a collaborative workspace. The first floor consists of a Learning Centre, seminar rooms, project spaces, IT Pit Stop, a Learning Atoll (four linked rooms), and a printing station.

=== Awards ===
In 2012 the Learning Environments Spatial Lab in the Frank Tate Building was honoured by the Victorian chapter of the Council of Educational Facilities Planners International (CEFPI), an international organisation representing educators, architects and designers involved in creating improved learning environments. CEFPI awarded the University an award for 'An Education Initiative or a Design Solution for an Innovative Program'.

== History ==
On completion, it was named in honour of Frank Tate, following his death in 1939. Tate was the first Director of Education, Victoria, serving between 1902 and 1928, and was a tireless reformer, including reform of the training of teachers at Melbourne Teachers' College (also known as the Melbourne Training School), on this site since 1888.

As part of the construction of the Brutalist-style Education Resource Centre to the west in 1968-70, a large plaza was created at first floor level surrounding most of the northern wing of the building, allowing the expansion of the ground level of Frank Tate Building under the plaza. This effectively submerged the north end, altering an appreciation of its features, and resulted in the creation of multiple entrances at different points and at different levels by added steps and ramps.

The building was refurbished between 2008 and 2010 by Cox Architecture as Melbourne University’s Eastern Precinct Student Centre aiding students in the undergraduate science programs. This involved the opening out of the southern half of the first floor to form a student lounge, and a lift was also introduced to the refurbishment in order to allow first floor access aiding the handicapped.

== Gallery ==
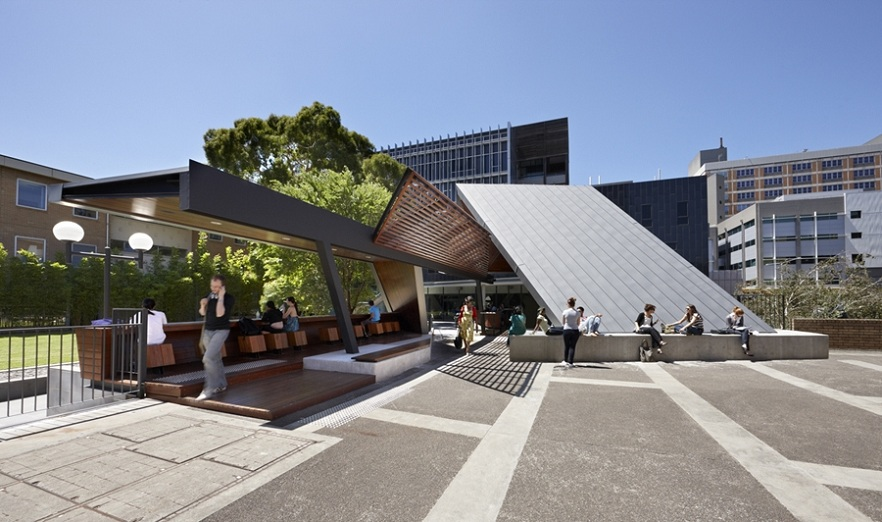
Frank Tate Pavilion

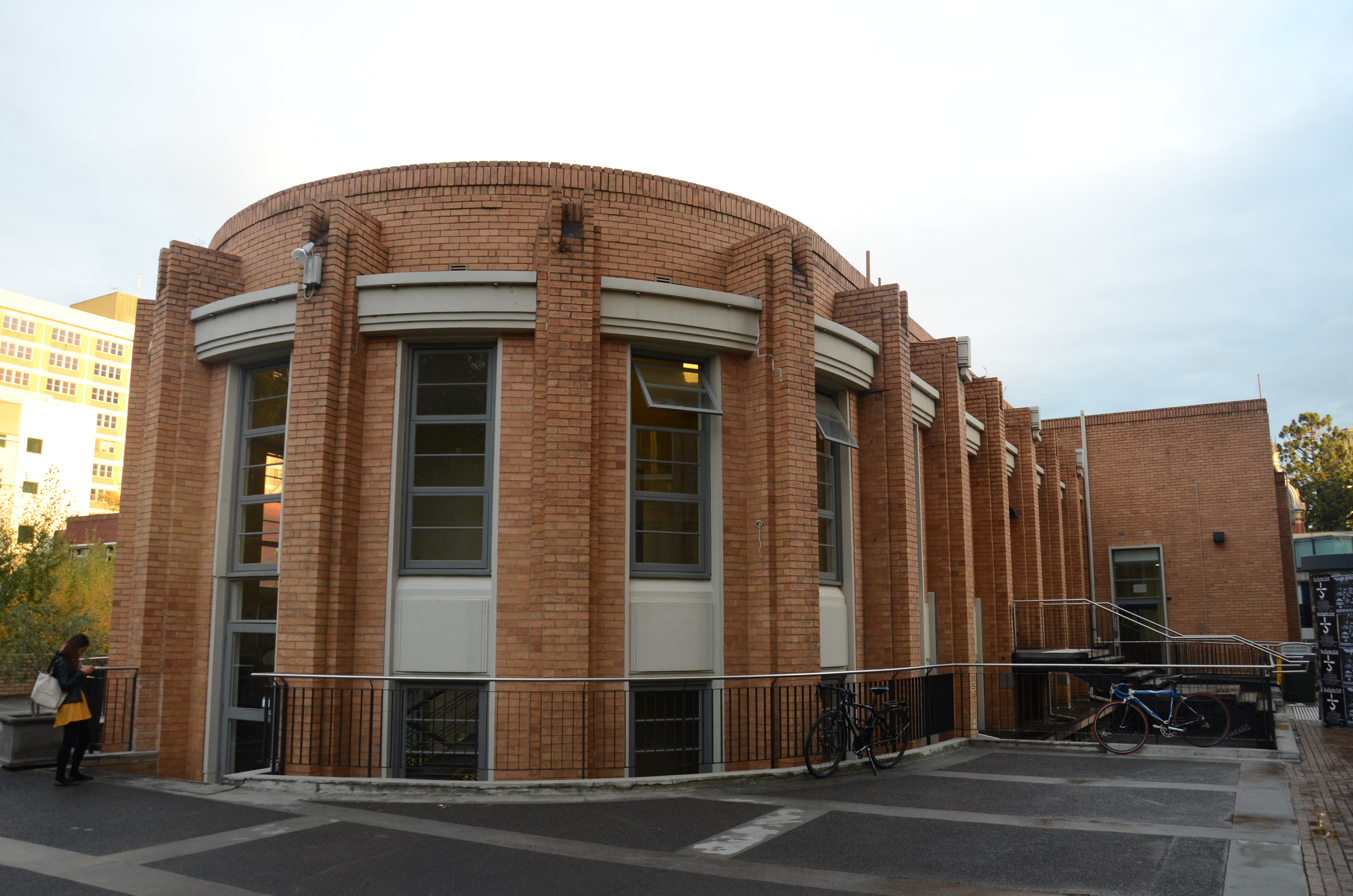
North elevation, fire exit

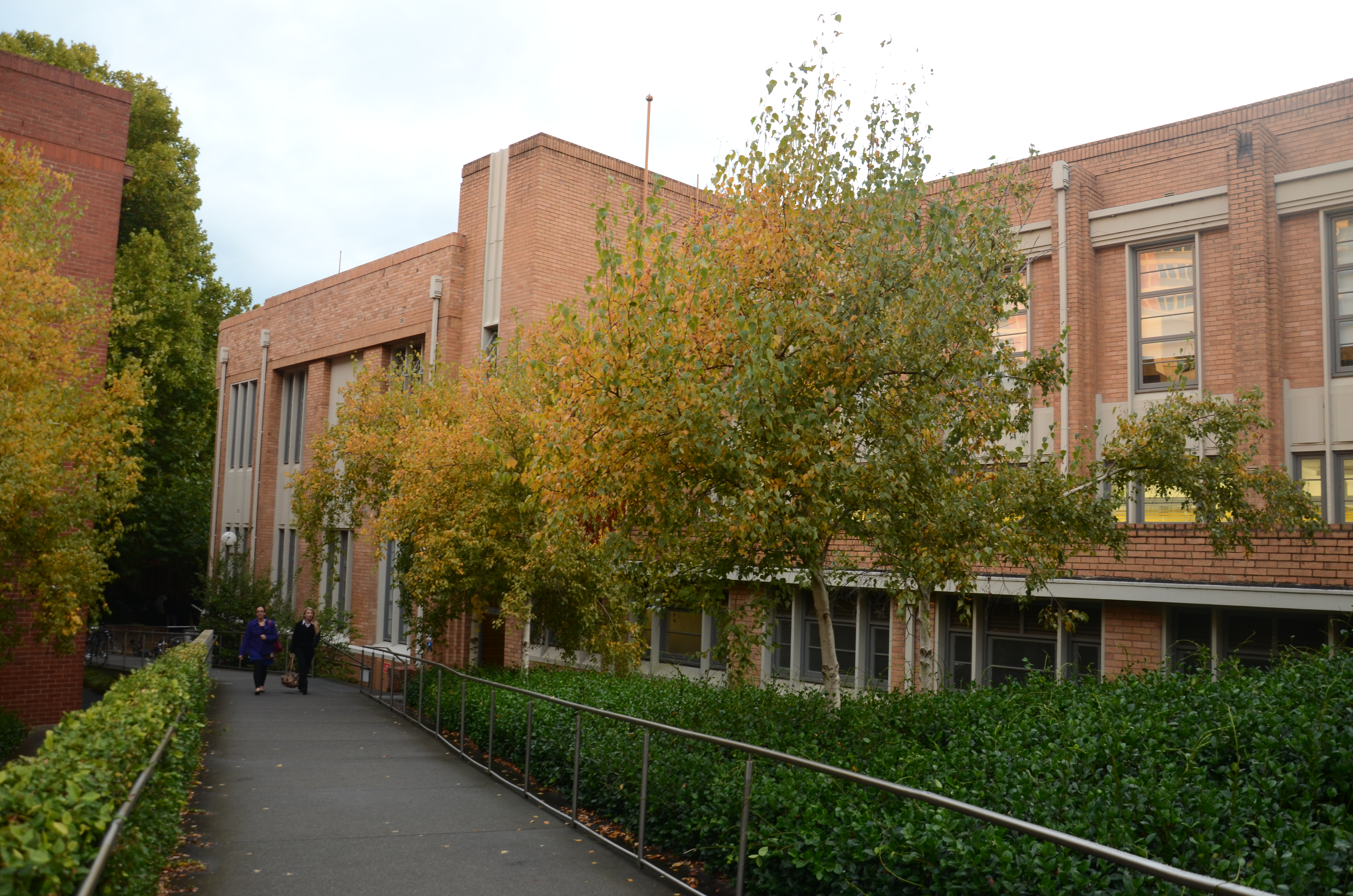
Pedestrian ramp, east elevation

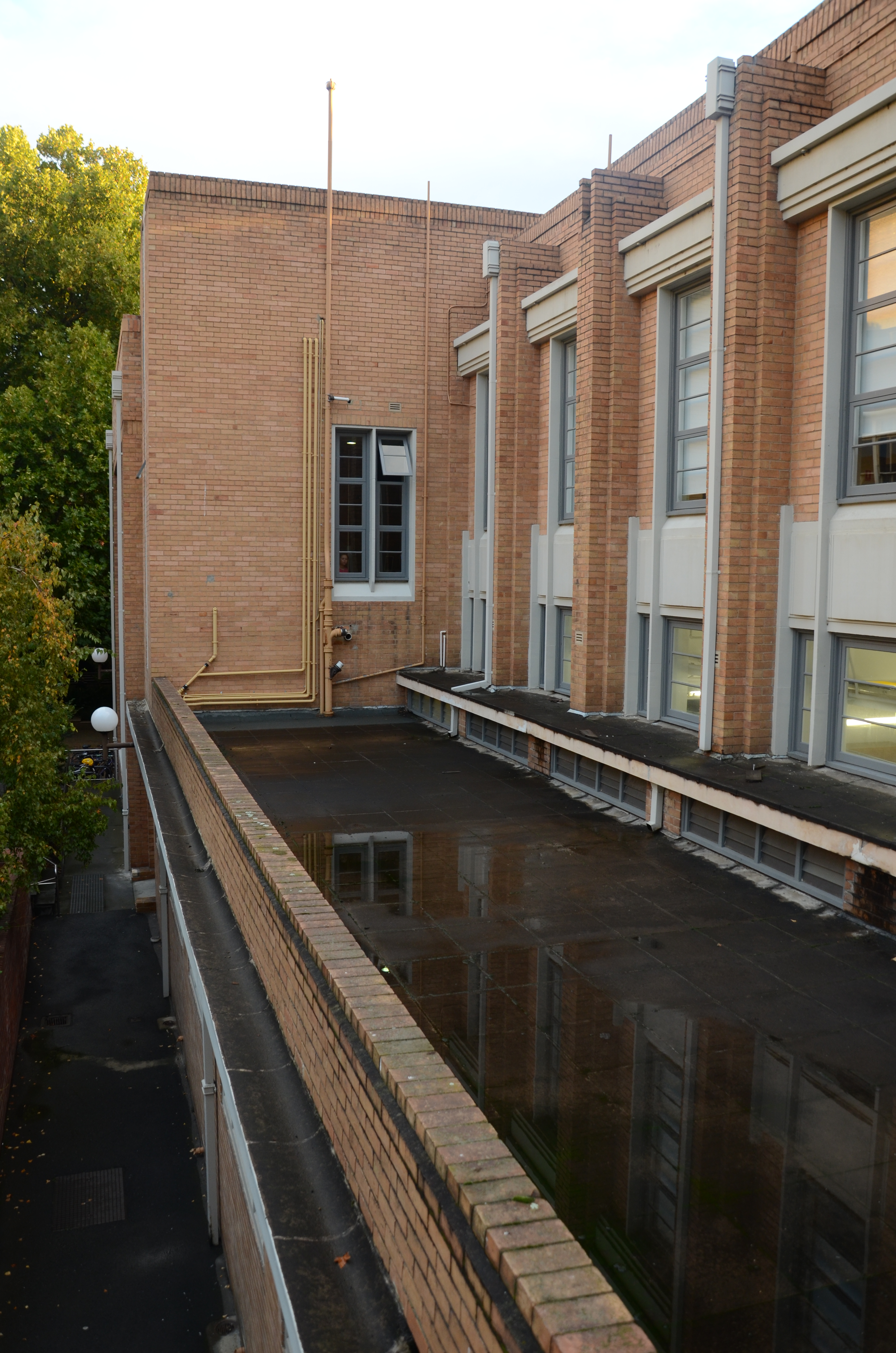
Flat roof, east elevation

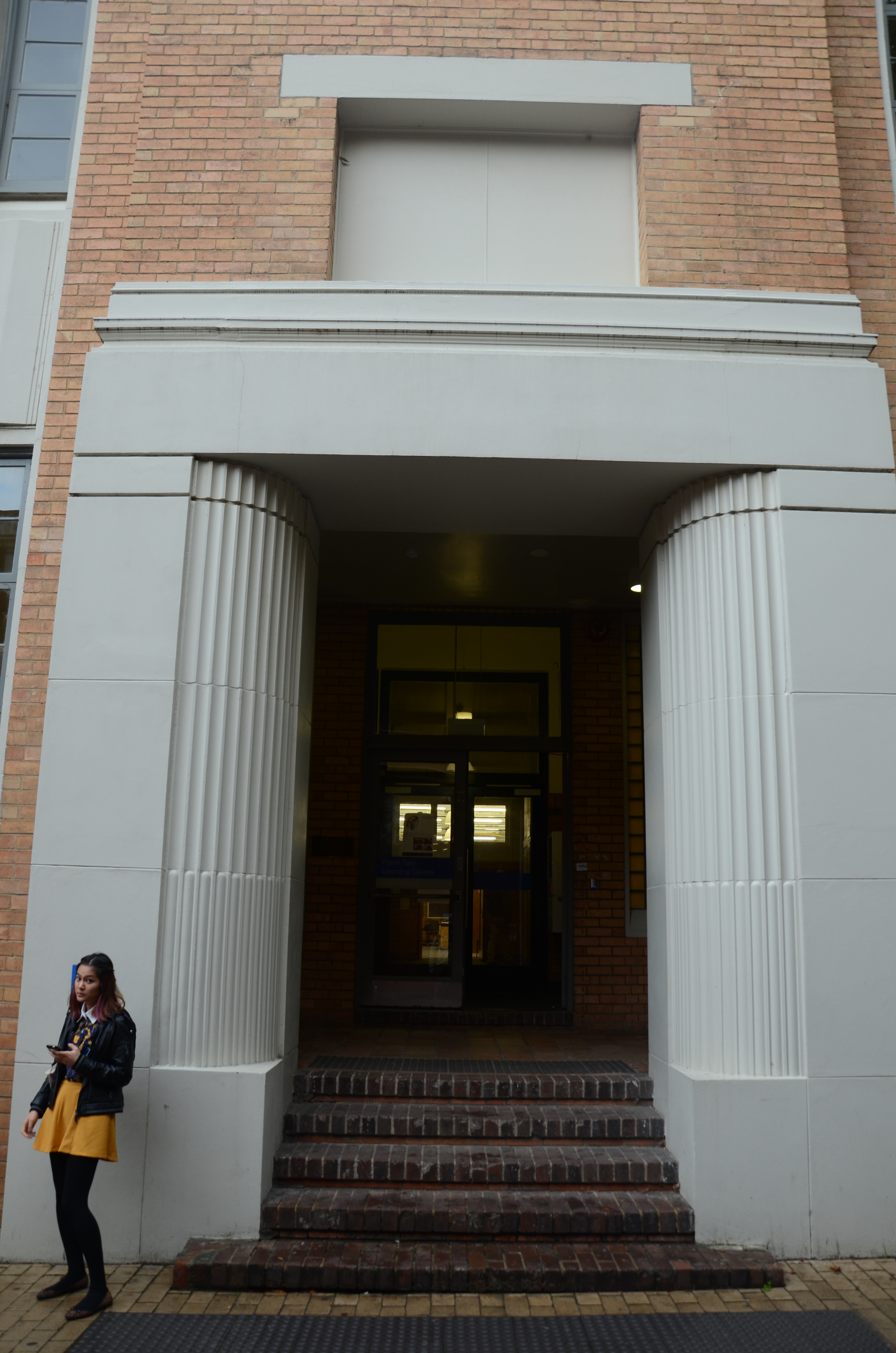
Main entrance

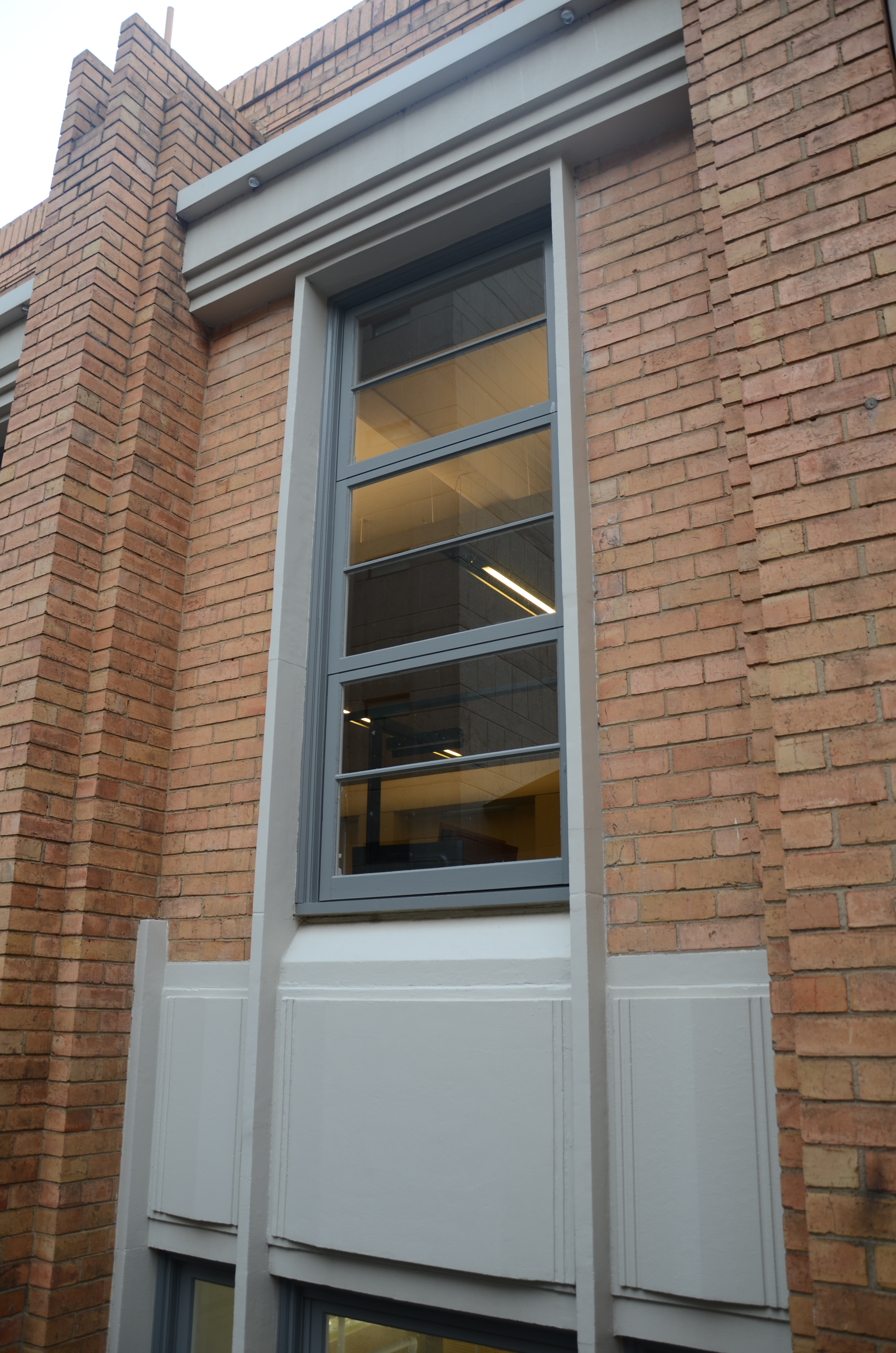
Window detail

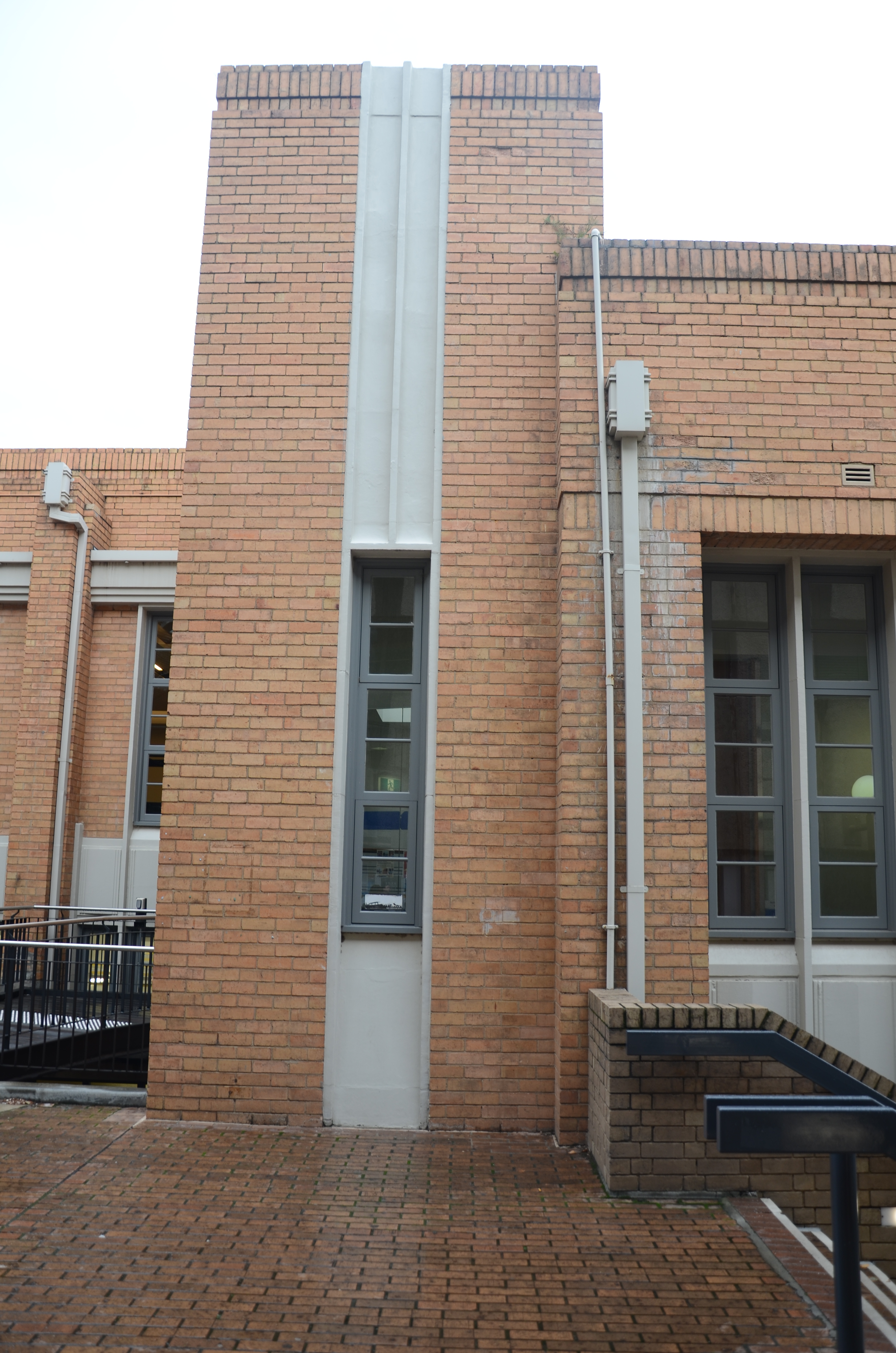
View from Level 1

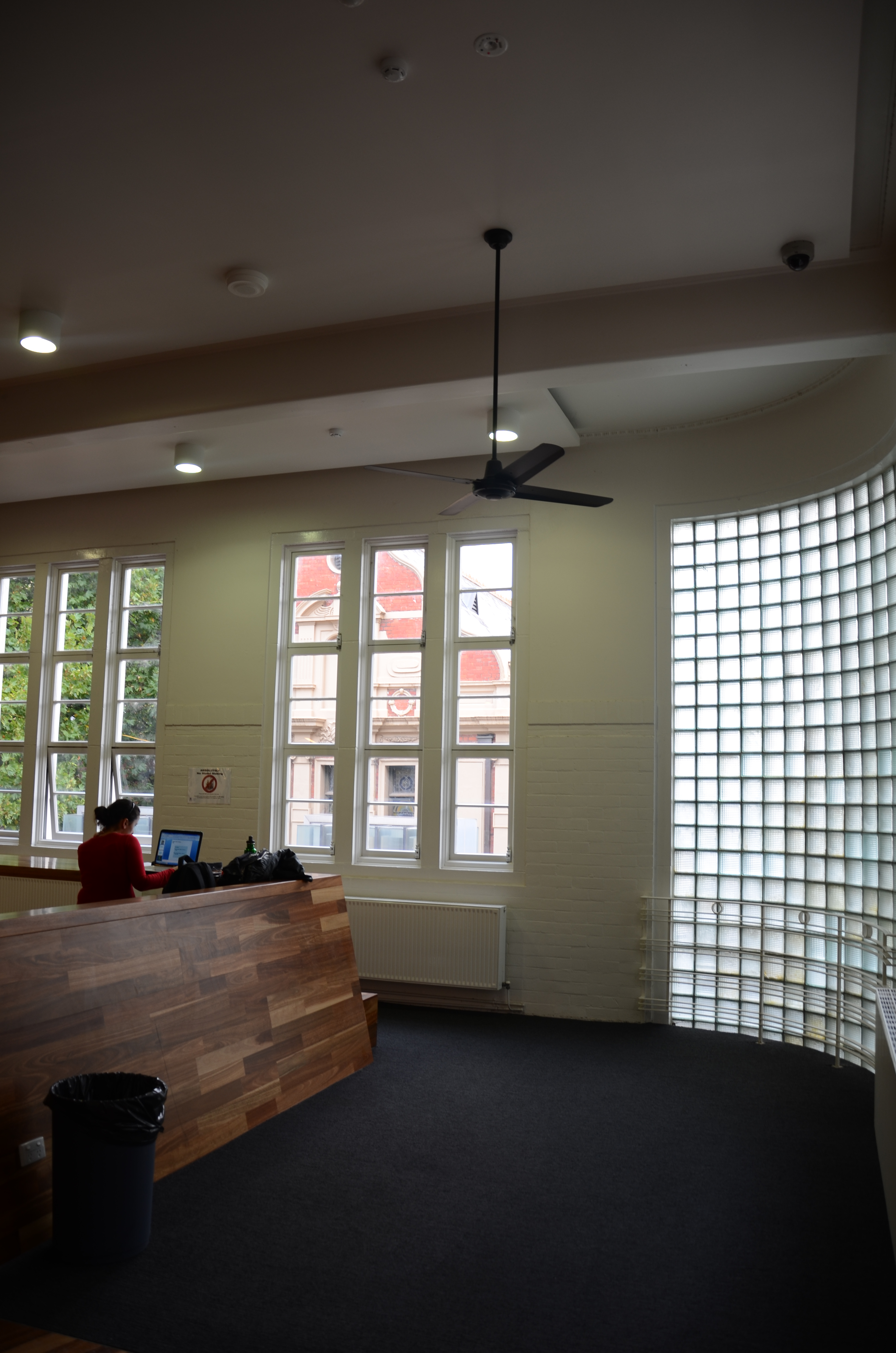
Study areas from Level 1
