= Camberwell Courthouse and Police Station =

Heritage-listed court house and police station in Melbourne, Victoria, Australia

- Location of the legal complex in Greater Metropolitan Melbourne

General information
- Status: Completed
- Type: Courthouse (1939–1989); Police station (since 1939– )
- Architectural style: Inter-war Moderne
- Location: 311–317 Camberwell Road, Camberwell, City of Boroondara, Melbourne, Victoria, Australia
- Coordinates: 37°49′59″S 145°03′33″E
- Year built: 1938–1939
- Completed: 1939; 87 years ago
- Closed: 1989 (court house only)
- Cost: A£3,759
- Owner: Victorian Government
- Operator: Victoria Police

Technical details
- Material: Bricks

Design and construction
- Architect: Percy Edgar Everett
- Developer: Victorian Public Works Department
- Main contractor: W. A. Medbury

Website
- police.vic.gov.au

Victorian Heritage Register
- Official name: Camberwell Courthouse and Police Station
- Type: Registered place
- Designated: 25 July 1996
- Reference no.: VHR H1194
- Heritage overlay no.: HO28
- Category: Law Enforcement

The Camberwell Courthouse and Police Station is a court house and police station complex, located at 311–317 Camberwell Road in Camberwell, in the City of Boroondara, in the inner eastern suburbs of Melbourne, in Victoria, Australia.

Built between 1938 and 1939 on the traditional lands of the Wurundjeri people, the legal complex was added to the Victorian Heritage Register on 25 July 1996 in recognition of its architectural significance.

== Description ==
The Camberwell Police Station and Court House complex was designed by the Victorian Public Works Department architect, Percy Edgar Everett; the complex was built by W. A. Medbury between 1938 and 1939. The complex is in the Inter-war Moderne style and is set on a diagonal axis. The buildings are constructed of red, brown and manganese bricks and contain Everett's trademark pattern detailing. The complex still retains a law enforcement function, as the court house was closed in 1989 and the building is now used for tribunal work.

The Camberwell complex is of architectural significance as an exceptionally fine and intact example of a building complex designed by Everett who was influential in the design and evolution of Moderne-style buildings in Victoria. The Camberwell complex was influential in the development of style in Victoria and later examples of Moderne-style buildings by Everett include the court houses in Shepparton and Sandringham, the William Angliss School, and government offices in Ballarat, all of which employ similar stylistic elements to those utilised by the Camberwell complex.

== See also ==
- Architecture of Melbourne
- List of places on the Victorian Heritage Register in the City of Boroondara
