= Essendon Keilor College =

High school in Melbourne, Victoria, Australia

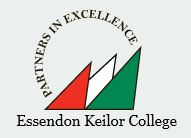

Location
- Moonee Valley, Melbourne; Victoria; Australia; 37°45′19″S 144°54′08″E

Information
- Type: Public high school
- Established: 1 January 1993; 33 years ago
- Oversight: Victorian Curriculum and Assessment Authority
- Principal: Adam Potter
- Campus Director: Lauren Gaylard (Niddrie); Sally Stevens (Essendon)
- Grades: 7–12
- Enrolment: 687 (2025)
- Campuses: Junior: Airport West (Niddrie); (37°43′48″S 144°52′45″E); Senior: Essendon; (37°45′19″S 144°54′08″E)
- Campus type: Suburban multi
- Colours: Blue and white
- Website: ekc.vic.edu.au

The Essendon Keilor College is a co-educational public secondary college with campuses located in the inner north-western suburbs of Melbourne, in Victoria, Australia. The college's campuses are located in Airport West (Note: Called Niddrie campus, despite not being located in the suburb of Niddrie.) (junior secondary) and Essendon (senior secondary).

As of 2025, the college had an enrolment of 687 students from Year 7 to Year 12 and delivered the Victorian Certificate of Education (VCE) and vocational pathways. The college has programs for international students, high achievers, and links to sporting academies for Australian rules football, basketball, and netball. The Essendon Keilor College uniform is a white coloured shirt with the symbol of the school on the left chest and dark blue coloured pants. A dark blue jumper with the school symbol is worn in winter.

== History ==
Announced in 1992, the college was officially established on 1 January 1993 from the amalgamation of Avondale Heights High School, Essendon High School (established in 1913), Keilor Heights High School, Niddrie High School, and Queens Park Secondary College (that was formerly Essendon Technical School, established in 1939). At the time of its formation, the five campuses were organised into two junior campuses and one senior campus, and further reorganised into one senior and one junior campus when the Keilor junior campus closed in 2025.

== Campuses ==
=== Niddrie (junior campus) ===
The Niddrie Campus is located at 19 Peters Street, in Airport West, co-located adjacent to the Niddrie Primary School. The Niddrie campus serves students from Years 7 to 9 on the site of the former Niddrie High School. Between 1994 and 2015, Western Autistic School ran a program for adolescents called the Baseroom out of a room at the campus. The program closed due to budget cuts.

Prior to joining Essendon Keilor College the boys' uniform consisted of grey jean slacks, a light blue shirt with a navy blue print of a planet splitting in the middle and a jumper with the same pattern but reverse colours.

=== Essendon (senior campus) ===
Essendon Keilor College Essendon campus
- Interactive map of Essendon Keilor College; Essendon campus
- 37°45′17″S 144°54′08″E
- Type: School buildings
- Location: 286 Buckley Street, Essendon

History
- Foundation stone laid: 12 June 1912
- Built: 4 February 1913; 113 years ago
- Built by: F. E. Shillabeer
- Built for: Department of Education

Site notes
- Material: Red bricks
- Architects: George Watson (1910); E. Evan Smith (1926); (Public Works Department)
- Architectural styles: Edwardian (1913); Inter-war Georgian Revival (1926)

Victorian Heritage Register
- Official name: Former Essendon High School
- Type: Registered place
- Designated: 20 February 1997
- Reference no.: H1294
- Heritage overlay no.: HO44
- Categories: Education; Parks, Gardens and Trees

The Essendon Campus is located at 286-290 Buckley Street in Essendon. The campus serves students in Years 10, 11 and 12 on the site of the former Essendon High School, and features specialised facilities for VCE studies and vocational pathways.

==== History ====
Before becoming part of Essendon Keilor College in 1993 the school was called Essendon High School. The Essendon campus of the college was added to the Victorian Heritage Register on 20 February 1997 in recognition of its historical, architectural, and aesthetic importance.

The school buildings were completed in two main stages, between 1912 and 1913; and in 1926. The school opened on 4 February 1913 as a higher elementary school, upgraded to high school status on 4 March 1914, making it the first of many such schools in metropolitan Melbourne. During the worldwide 1919 influenza epidemic, the school was requisitioned as a hospital with a mortuary and army-operated kitchen, and forty staff.

==== Description ====
The main school buildings are single-storied and red brick, surrounding an unroofed quadrangle, designed by George Watson, of the Public Works Department, in the Edwardian style. The assembly hall opened in 1926, designed by E. Evan Smith, also of the Public Works Department, in the Inter-war Georgian Revival style with bold compositional elements, and noted for its layout of classrooms on the lower level, and hall above.

The row of twenty two Monterey Cypress trees (Cupressus macrocarpa) on the north side of the hall is aesthetically important for the framing they provide to the building.

== Former campuses ==
=== Essendon Technical School ===
Essendon Technical School (former)
- Interactive map of Essendon Technical School (former)
- 37°45′27″S 144°55′24″E
- Type: School buildings (former)
- Location: 38 Buckley Street, Essendon

History
- Foundation stone laid: 6 October 1938
- Founded: February 1939
- Built: August 1939; 87 years ago
- Built by: J. J. Corbett
- Built for: Department of Education
- Closed (as a school): 31 December 1992 (amalgamated, building repurposed)

Site notes
- Material: Red bricks
- Architects: Percy Edgar Everett; (Public Works Department)
- Architectural style: Inter-War Moderne
- Current use: TAFE institute

Victorian Heritage Register
- Official name: Former Essendon Technical School
- Type: Registered place
- Designated: 20 February 1997
- Reference no.: H1295
- Heritage overlay no.: HO42
- Category: Education

Before becoming part of Essendon Keilor College in 1993, the school was called Essendon Technical School, located on 38 Buckley Street, Essendon. Upon establishment of the Essendon Keilor College in 1993, the site was assessed as surplus to requirements and repurposed for use as a TAFE institute. Prior to the school's amalgamation, the former Essendon Technical School was also added to the Victorian Heritage Register on 20 February 1997 in recognition of its historical, architectural, and aesthetic importance.

==== History ====
The former Essendon Technical School opened in February 1939 in the old buildings of the Melbourne Junior Technical School, La Trobe Street. It was relocated to the Essendon site in October 1939. World War II directed development of the school, and oriented the curriculum in the post-war years to aircraft and munitions training. During the 1950s, 1960s and 1970s the school changed to reflect trends in industry, training students for university technical courses as well as apprenticeships. The origins of the school can be traced to The Working Men's College (now known as RMIT University) established in 1887 and its junior school, The Lower Technical School, formed in 1903. This latter school, later known as Melbourne Junior Technical School, moved to its location in La Trobe Street in 1912, and became Essendon Technical School in 1939. The former Essendon Technical School was the first junior technical school to be established in Victoria and was representative of the post-war phase of schooling in Victoria when the technical system of education was fostered at specialised schools.

==== Description ====
The former school was a two-story red brick building designed in 1938 by Percy Edgar Everett, (Note: A former technical school principal, Everett undertook extensive planning for schools, and introduced entirely new types of technical, high, consolidated and elementary schools, and other Australian states adopted his planning and designs.) of the Public Works Department, and was constructed by J. J. Corbett. Featuring large areas of windows and incorporating a range of geometric shapes, the European-inspired building was hailed for advancing school design in the Inter-War Moderne style, and for the inspiration it would provide to the other Australian states. The bold semi-circular stairwell of glass bricks and banded brickwork, juxtaposed by rectangular shapes of brick surfaces and metal-framed windows, remains a striking monument to the modern movement. The circular landscaping at the school's entrance contributes to the play of geometrical shapes in the building, and its sole feature, a 'Hybrid Flame Tree' (Brachychiton x roseus notho subsp. roseus), is important for its aesthetic qualities.

=== Keilor East ===
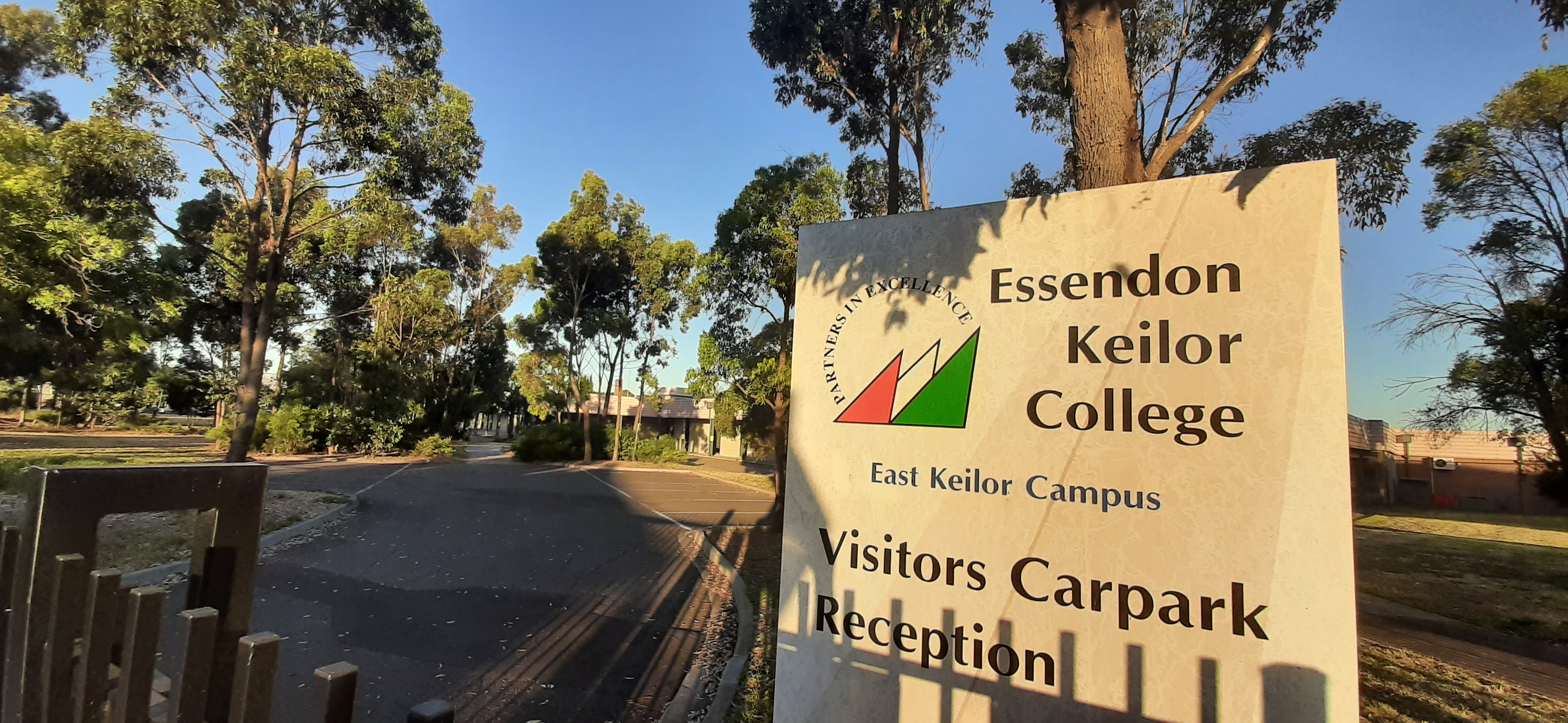
Keilor East former campus

The former East Keilor campus was located in East Keilor on Quinn Grove, next to the East Keilor Leisure Centre. Between 1992 and 2025, the campus served students in Years 7 to 9. The school was known as Keilor Heights High School from 1968 to 1992. The former Keilor Heights High School uniform consisted of grey slacks and a light blue shirt for boys, while girls wore a light blue dress or navy skirt, both checked with red, yellow, green and blue. The navy school jumper bore the school's logo of an open book and the motto 'Seek the Highest'.

== Notable alumni ==
- Paul Ahern, Australian rules footballer
- Mitch Banner, Australian rules footballer
- Ryan Crowley, Australian rules footballer
- Lynden Dunn, Australian rules footballer
- Corey Ellis, Australian rules footballer
- Kyle Hartigan, Australian rules footballer
- Jeremy Laidler, Australian rules footballer
- Callum Moore, Australian rules footballer
- Shaun McKernan, Australian rules footballer
- Brent Reilly, Australian rules footballer
- Tom Sheridan, Australian rules footballer
- Tash Sultana, musician
- Andrew Welsh, Australian rules footballer

=== Essendon High School ===
- Barry Davis, Australian rules footballer
- John Farrar, musician and songwriter
- Brian Fitzpatrick, historian, civil libertarian
- Ken Fletcher, Australian rules footballer
- Ted Hill, Australian barrister and communist activist
- James Housden, bishop
- Clare Stevenson, inaugural Director of the Women's Auxiliary Australian Air Force
- Alan Villiers, author and adventurer
- Tim Watson, Australian rules footballer, sports commentator

== See also ==
- List of government schools in Victoria, Australia
- List of places on the Victorian Heritage Register in the City of Moonee Valley
