= Percy Edgar Everett =

Australian architect (1888–1967)

- Born: 26 June 1888
- Died: 6 May 1967 (aged 78)
- Occupation: Architect

Percy Edgar Everett (26 June 1888 - 6 May 1967) was an Australian architect. He was appointed chief architect of the Victorian Public Works Department in 1934 and is best known for the striking Modernist / Art Deco technical colleges, schools, hospitals, court houses, and office buildings the department produced over the next 20 years.

His most well known design is the Police Headquarters at Russell Street (1940–1943), giving Melbourne "its first Gotham City silhouette". Percy Edgar Everett's signature style reflected and often combined a range of sources including American Art Deco, Streamline Moderne, and European early Modernism, such as Brick Expressionism, the German Bauhaus and even Russian Constructivism, drawn from magazines and his two trips abroad. He was also adept at designing in other modes, such as Tudor, Georgian and Rustic styles, when appropriate.

== Early life ==
Everett was born in Geelong, Victoria, Australia. His father, Joseph Everett was a blacksmith from England. Joseph established a coach-building business, and later a building business, for which Percy assisted with detailed aspect of the buildings.

He received his early education in Ashby Public School. The two subjects that drew most of his attention during his time at Ashby were drawing and piano lessons. It was there he first tried his hand at sketching. Among his early subjects were ships, figureheads, and sailors, suggesting the kind of environment he was born into.

== Early career in Geelong ==
His interest in drawing, and his experience in the building industry, led him to architecture as his first career choice, with music as a second choice. Everett gained experience with Geelong architect W. H. Cleverdon and then became the first architecture student to enrol in the Gordon Technical College, under the dynamic leadership of George R. King, who established architectural section at the college. Everett graduated in 1906 and began his career as a graduate architect.

Everett first worked at the Geelong Harbor Trust (1907–1910), where he planned and supervised his first structure, a wool store, and also designed the Edwardian-style "Sailors Rest" building on the Geelong foreshore. He then worked for the firm of Seeley & King, forming a partnership with them two years later. Seeley, King & Everett was his first private practice.

The practice was taken over by the firm of Laird and Buchan while Everett was on a trip to Britain and Europe in 1913. In 1914, when still connected with Laird and Buchan, he opened a separate practice in Melbourne, but since there was a shortage of architectural work due to the First World War, he took up the post of principal of the Brunswick Technical School (1916).

He also continued his association with Laird & Buchan, with whom he designed the elaborate bandstand in Johnstone Park, Geelong, which was constructed in 1919. That same year, the association also designed the Edwardian-Baroque Peace Memorial, on the axis of the bandstand, as well as redesigning the park in a more formal manner. The revamped park and memorial were completed in 1926.

In 1930, like many other Australian architects during the Great Depression, he undertook a world tour including the US and the UK, but unusually also included the USSR. In 1932 he was appointed headmaster of Brighton Technical School.

== Public Works Department ==
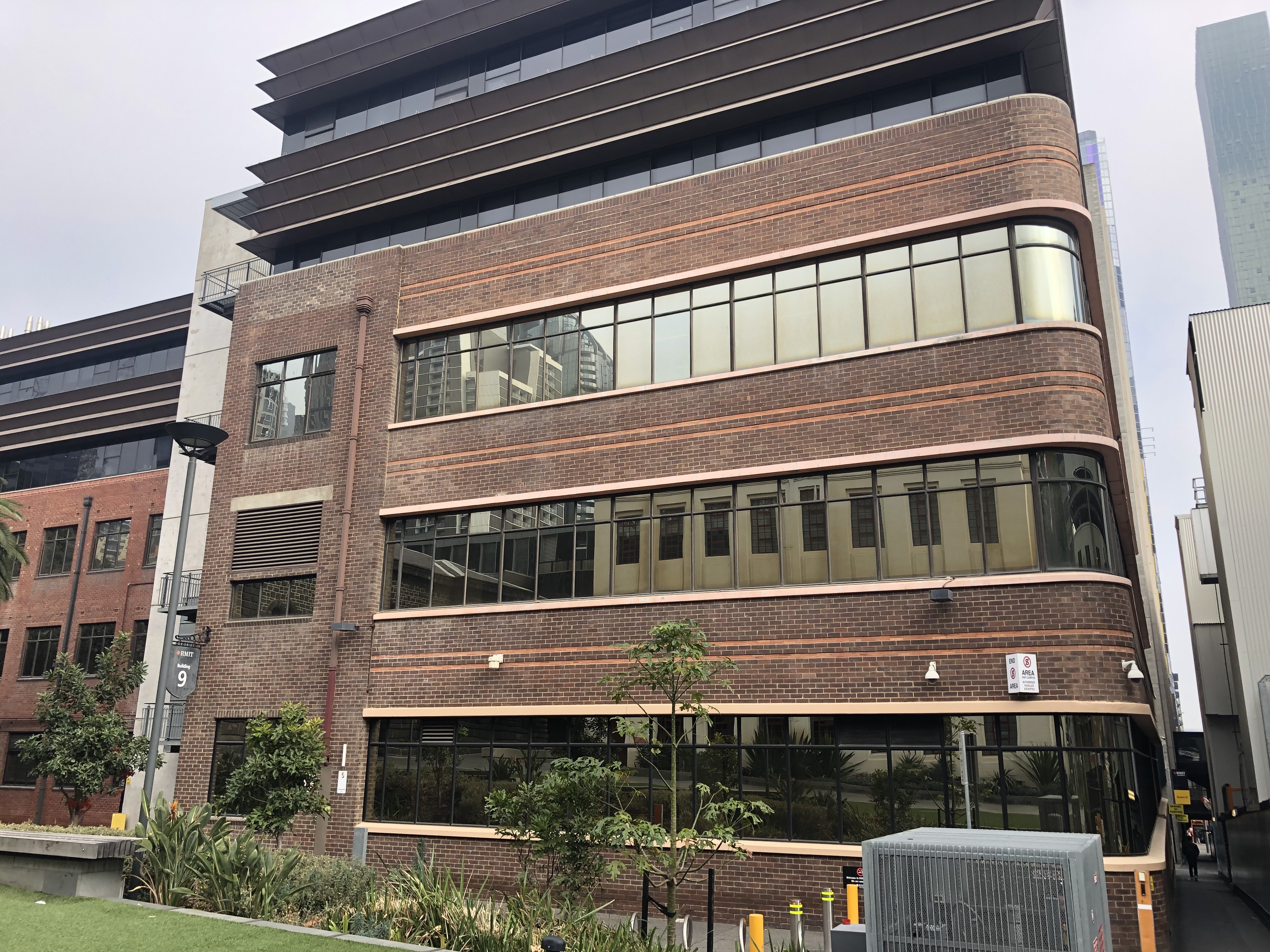
RMIT Building 9, north section, 1941

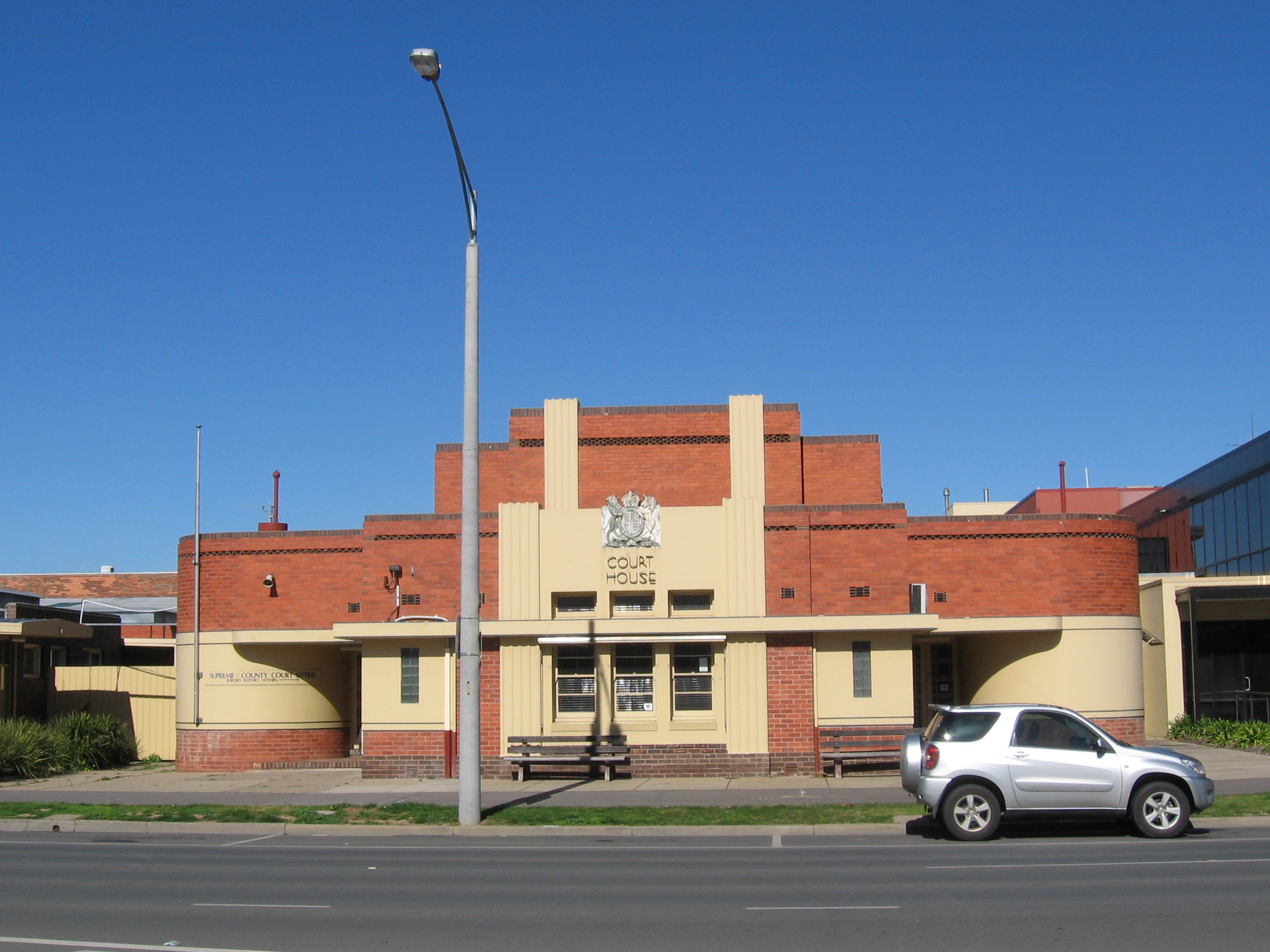
Shepparton Court House, 1938

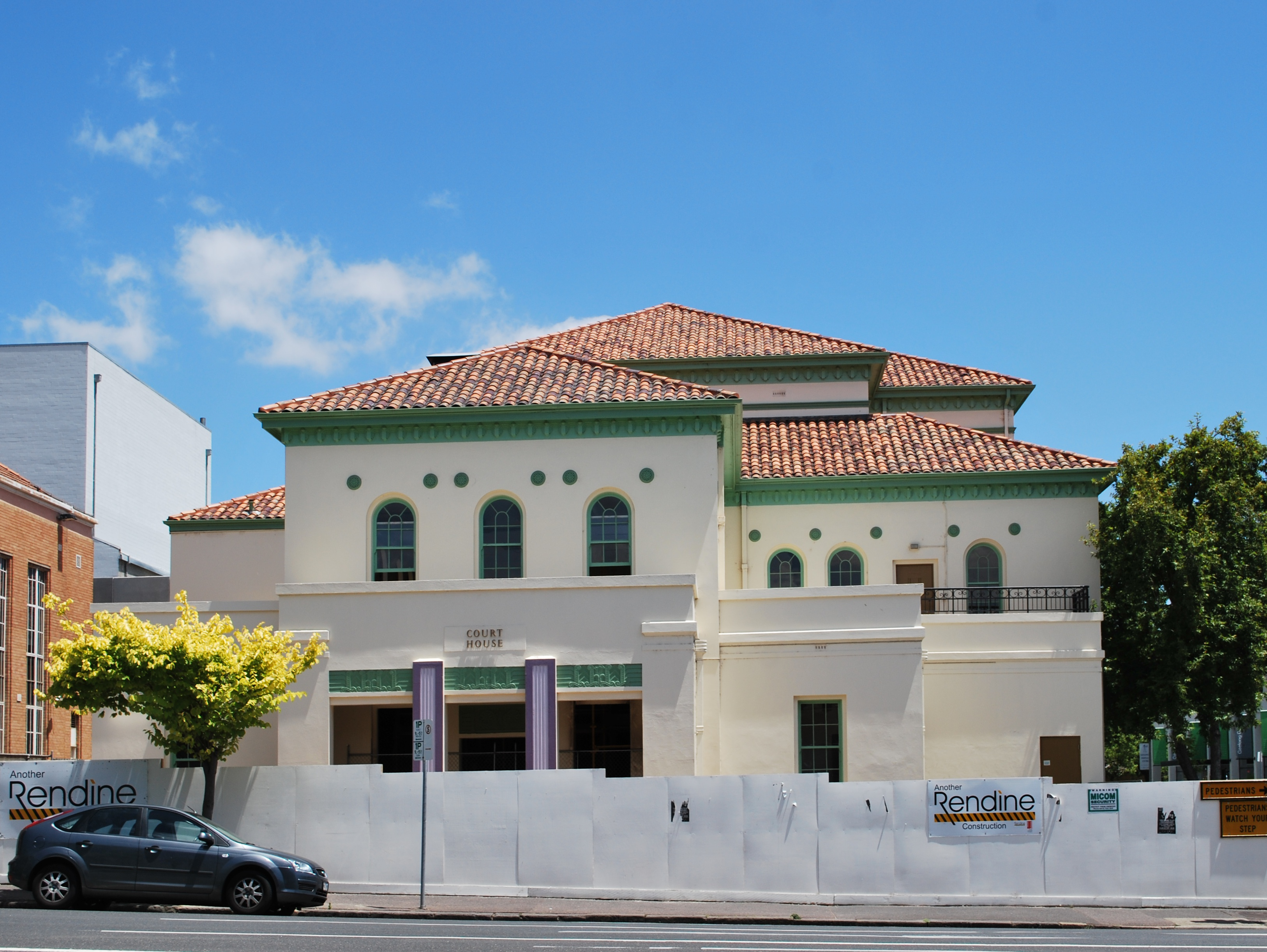
Geelong Court House, 1938

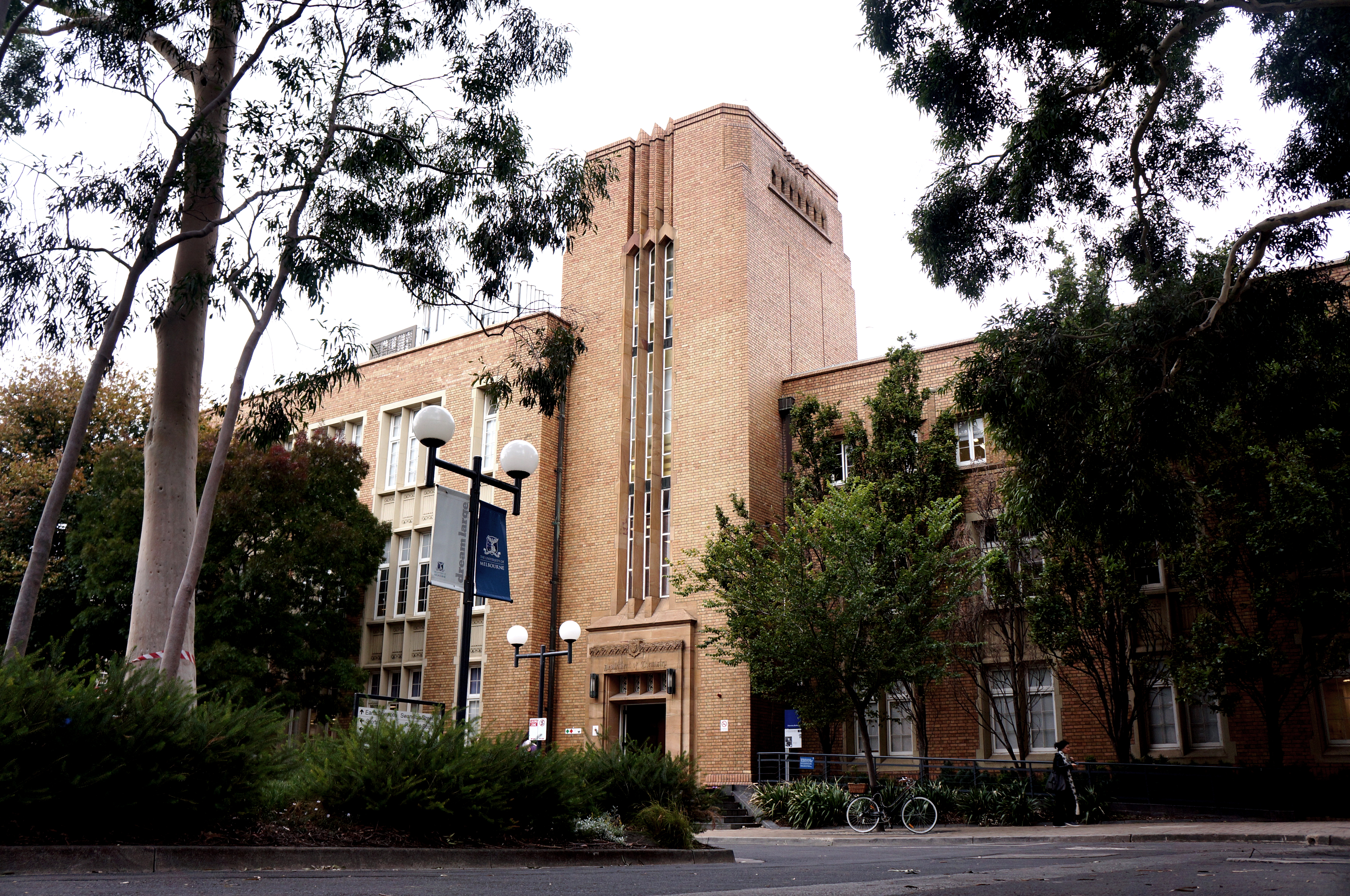
Chemistry School, University of Melbourne, 1940

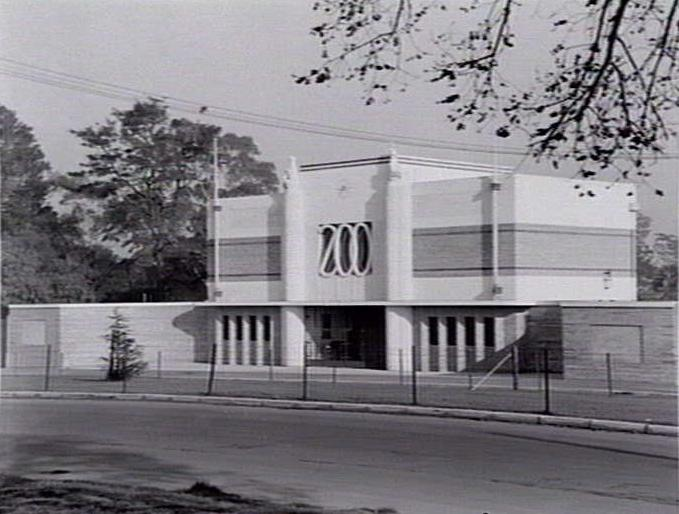
Melbourne Zoo entrance, 1939

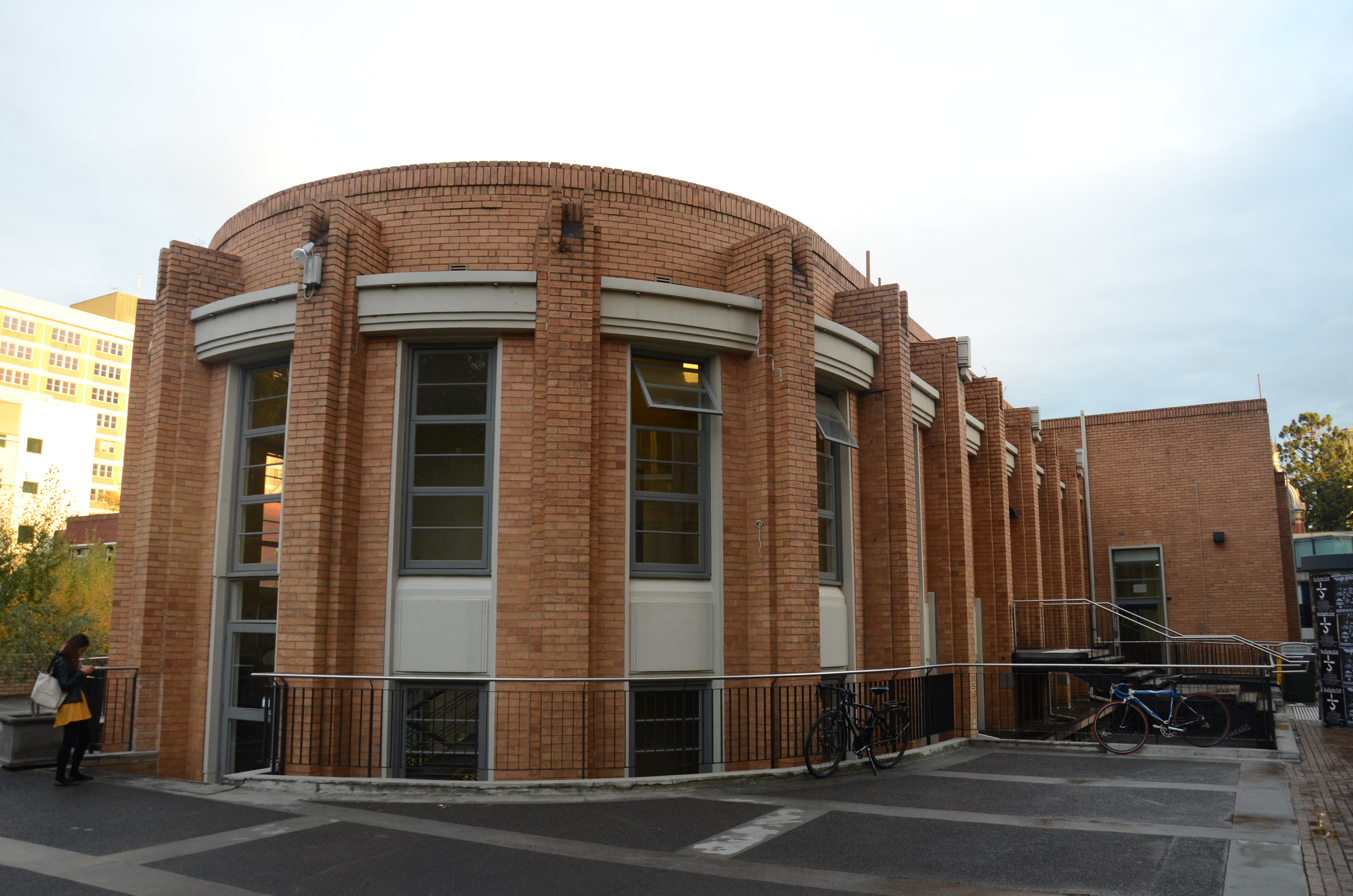
Frank Tate Building, University of Melbourne, 1940

Russell Street Police Headquarters, 1940-43

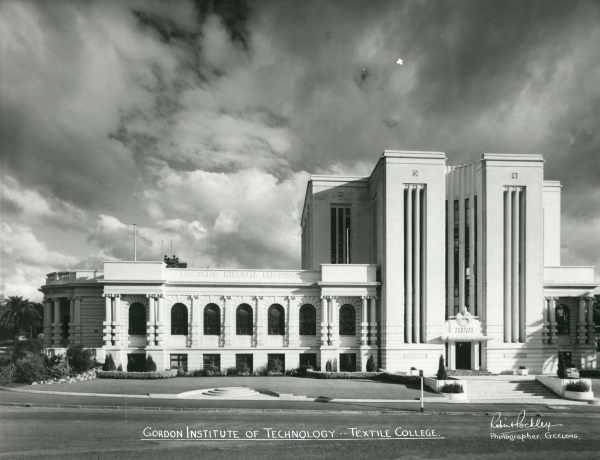
Gordon Technical School, Textile College, 1947

Two years later, in 1934, Everett was appointed Chief Architect of the Victorian Public Works Department (PWD). This was an extremely important position, making him responsible for the design of the State's public buildings. This included new state offices, courthouses, police stations, hospitals (including tuberculosis (TB) sanatoriums and mental hospitals), schools, colleges, and even some leisure facilities on public land. Much of the output was additional buildings or wings expanding existing institutions.

The designs produced by the PWD, where he insisted on absolute control over the designs, immediately changed from the polite simplified red brick Georgian of the 1920s to mostly dramatic modernist compositions. The first buildings to be completed by the office under his direction included the Streamline Moderne Drouin Primary School, and the Amsterdam School style Yallourn Technical School (demolished), which both opened in 1936.

Under his direction, the PWD went on to create a range of modernist designs for numerous high-profile public buildings, with a large number built between 1936 and 1941, only slowing down as World War II restrictions came into force. Essendon Technical School (1939), Camberwell Court House (1939) and the William Angliss College (1940) are considered amongst the best of this period, and are all on the Victorian Heritage Register. Influences from various strains of Modernism can be discerned, including the 1920s Amsterdam School, the German Bauhaus and Brick Expressionism, and even 1920s Russian Constructivism. Some projects were influenced by the US skyscraper style, including the outstanding Russell Street Police Headquarters (1940–43) and the smaller Ballarat State Offices (1941). The curved and sweeping lines of the Streamlined Moderne was another influence, often used for the sometimes long school buildings and hospital wings, while a more typical Art Deco approach was also used, notably for the Shepparton Courthouse and Wangaratta Courthouse and State Offices, both of 1938.

Everett, like all interwar architects, could design in a range styles when it seemed appropriate. Examples include the rustic style Yarra Bend Golf House (1936), the Mediterranean influenced Geelong Court House (1938), and the Collegiate Gothic Melbourne University Chemistry School (1940). The many smaller police stations were quite domestic in character, with pitched roofs and simple detailing.

In 1945, Everett went to North America to study recent trends in public architecture, but after WWII the style of buildings produced under his direction did not change. As public buildings were given priority, numerous public buildings with his distinctive flair, such as the TB wing at Hamilton Base Hospital (1945), Caulfield Institute of Technology (1947), and large TB Sanatoria at Heatherton and Greenvale (both 1946, now demolished) were major projects in the post war years. By then however, architectural progressives were calling for a more truly modern approach, as distinct from Everett's devotion to dynamic effects.

One of many governmental projects the PWD executed at this time was the dramatic Department of Agriculture annexe to the 19th century Italianate State Government offices, built in 1948 (demolished 1997). The building housed sections for photography, films and radio, as well as a small cinema, because film and radio were seen as significant new methods of helping to educate and inform farmers. It also showed his interest in dominating older buildings, while at the same time responding to their layout. His 1940s additions and alterations at the Gordon Technical College in his native Geelong also display this approach.

One Everett design however did display some true innovation at this time; while still not reflecting the postwar International Style he developed a new prototype for primary schools based on hexagonal classrooms. Built in cream brick, with large timber window-walls and clerestory windows, they were designed to provide the largest floor area with a minimum of materials, and the ability for all pupils to be close to the teacher. Extant examples remain at North Balwyn (1950), Solway (Ashburton) (1950), Red Hill Consolidated (1951), and North Coburg (1952).

Everett retired as chief architect in June 1953, but continued in private practice until the late 1950s.

== Personal life ==
Everett married twice. On 11 June 1924, he married Georgina Buchanan Arthur (née Boyd), a widow, at Mentone, Victoria. Following her death in 1956, he married Mavis Delgany Stewart (née Richards), also a widow, at Brighton, Victoria, on 26 June 1956. He had two step-children.

Everett died at Brighton Beach, Victoria on 6 May 1967.

== Works ==
- Yarra Bend Golf House, Yarra Bend Park, Fairfield, Victoria (1936)
- Drouin Primary School, Drouin (1936)
- Yallourn Technical School, Yallourn (1936), demolished.
- Box Hill Technical School for Girls and Women, Whitehorse Road, Box Hill (1936)
- Dunstan Estate, Griffin Crescent and Southward Avenue, Port Melbourne (1937)
- Preston Technical College (now Melbourne Polytechnic Building B), (1937)
- Coburg North Primary School, O'Hea Street, Coburg North, (1937)
- Geelong Court House, Geelong (1938)
- Wangaratta Court and State Offices, Wangaratta (1938)
- Shepparton Court House, Shepparton (1938)
- Chemistry Building, Melbourne University (1938)
- Monkey Island, Melbourne Zoo, Parkville (1938), demolished
- RMIT Buildings 6, 5, 7 & 9, Bowen Street, RMIT, Melbourne (5 & 9 1938, 7 in 1948, 6 in 1955)
- State Library forecourt, new paths and landscaping (1939)
- Essendon Technical School, Essendon, Victoria (1939)
- Camberwell Courthouse and Police Station, Camberwell Road, Camberwell (1939)
- Lorne Comfort Station, Lorne foreshore, now Lorne Beach Pavilion (1939)
- Melbourne Zoo Entrance and Fence, Royal Park (1939)
- Cooriemungle Prison Camp, Bornong Rd, Cooriemungle (1940)
- Frank Tate Building, Melbourne University, Parkville (1940)
- Sushine Technical School for Girls, Derby Road (1940)
- William Angliss Food Trades, Latrobe Street, Melbourne (1940)
- State Government Offices, Ballarat, Victoria (1941)
- State Accident Insurance Office, 412 Collins Street, Melbourne (1941)
- Camberwell HIgh School (1941)
- Box Hill Boys Technical School (now Box Hill Senior Secondary School), Dunloe Avenue, Mont Albert (1942)
- Larundel Psychiatric Hospital, Mont Park, Bundoora (1942–49), altered
- Footscray Technical School, Ballarat Road (1943)
- Russell Street Police Headquarters, Melbourne (1940–1943)
- Hamilton Hospital TB Chalet, Hamilton (1945)
- Ward Block, Heatherton TB Sanatorium, Heatherton, Victoria (1946), demolished.
- Greenvale TB Sanatorium, Greenvale (1946), demolished.
- Chemistry School, Swinburne Technical College (now Swinburne University), Burwood Road, Hawthorn (1946)
- Collingwood Technical School - Footwear School, Wellington Street, Collingwood (1946)
- Geelong High School, Ryrie Street frontage, Geelong (1946)
- Caulfield Technical College extension, Nepean Highway, Caulfield East (1947)
- Oakleigh Technical School, Poath Road, (1947), demolished
- Burnley Horticultural College, Admin and Classrooms Building, Yarra Boulevard, Richmond (1947)
- Gordon Technical School, Textile College, now part of Gordon Institute of TAFE, Geelong (1947)
- Upwey Primary School, (1947)
- Timboon High School, Timboon (1948)
- Department of Agriculture annexe, East Melbourne (1949), demolished 1997.
- F.G.Scholes Block (Wards), Fairfield Infectious Diseases Hospital, Fairfield, Victoria (1949)
- Richmond Girls Secondary School (now Lynall Hall Community School), cnr Highett Street and Gleadell Street, Richmond (1951)
- Nurses Home, Heatherton TB Sanatorium, Heatherton, Victoria (1952), demolished.
- Hexagonal Primary Schools - Moorabbin West (1948), demolished, Solway (Ashburton) (1949), North Balwyn (1950), demolished, Newlands (North Coburg), (1951), Wangaratta West (1952), demolished, Lockington Consolidated (1951), demolished, Pakenham Consolidated (1951), demolished.

== See also ==
- Harry Winbush
