= Western Autistic School =

- Laverton, Victoria; Australia

Information
- Type: Special school
- Established: 1979
- Principal: Adele Field
- Grades: prep-3
- Colours: Green and blue
- Website: http://www.westernautisticschool.vic.edu.au

Western Autistic School, in the Melbourne suburb of Laverton, Australia, is an educational organisation for students in prep to grade three who have autism spectrum disorder (ASD). The school caters for students up to grade 3.

== History and faculties ==
Western Autistic School, prior to 1990, was officially known as the Western Autistic Centre.

It was parents who first saw the need for an educational centre specifically for autistic children and worked towards it being established in 1979. The purchase of the house and land at 98 Ascot Vale Road in Flemington, in 1984 represented a huge step forward. The school operated from that site when it transferred to the Ministry of Education on 1 February 1990. The school grew rapidly on transfer to the Ministry and the Northern Annexe was opened in January 1992 in response to a growing waiting list. Demand for specialised educational services continued in 1997 and the main school moved to the complex on the corner of Garnet and Teague Streets in Niddrie (previously occupied by Doutta Galla Primary School) as a permanent stand alone school. In 2014, it had 320 pupils.

Between 1994 and 2015, the school ran an adolescent program called the Baseroom out of a room at Essendon Keilor College's Niddrie campus. It was closed down in 2015 due to budget cuts. The Baseroom allowed students to attended EKC as usual, in full EKC uniform, while using the Baseroom at lunch breaks. The school also ran an adolescent art and music program for some years, which closed in 2015.

The Western Autistic School Autism Teaching Institute was established in 2005. Teacher training courses commenced in 2006.

In July 2006, it was announced that a purpose-built Autism Specific School would be built at 1 Burnley Street, Laverton. The Laverton Campus opened for students and staff on 25 August 2010.

Until 2021, the school had two campuses: the main campus at Laverton with 300 students and the original campus at Niddrie with 100+ students. In 2021 the Wattle Program for adolescent students was closed and Niddrie Campus was spun off into its own school, the Niddrie Autistic School, with Paige Davey appointed principal of the new school. As of 2024, Davey is no longer principal.

=== Principals ===
There have been three principals at the original school - Margaret Wilson 1987–2000, Valerie Gill 2000-2013 and Mary Thomson 2013–2021. Since 2021, the principals have been Adele Field at Western Autistic School and Paige Davey at Niddrie Autistic School.

Gill won the Outstanding School Leadership Award of the Victorian Education Excellence Awards, and received a Public Service Medal as a Queen's Birthday Honour in 2007. She was also a vocal opponent to the creation of an autism P-12 school for Western Melbourne despite it being revealed in the Autism Education Provisions Review that approximately half the students from WAS transition to Special Education Schools.
