= Russell Street Police Headquarters =

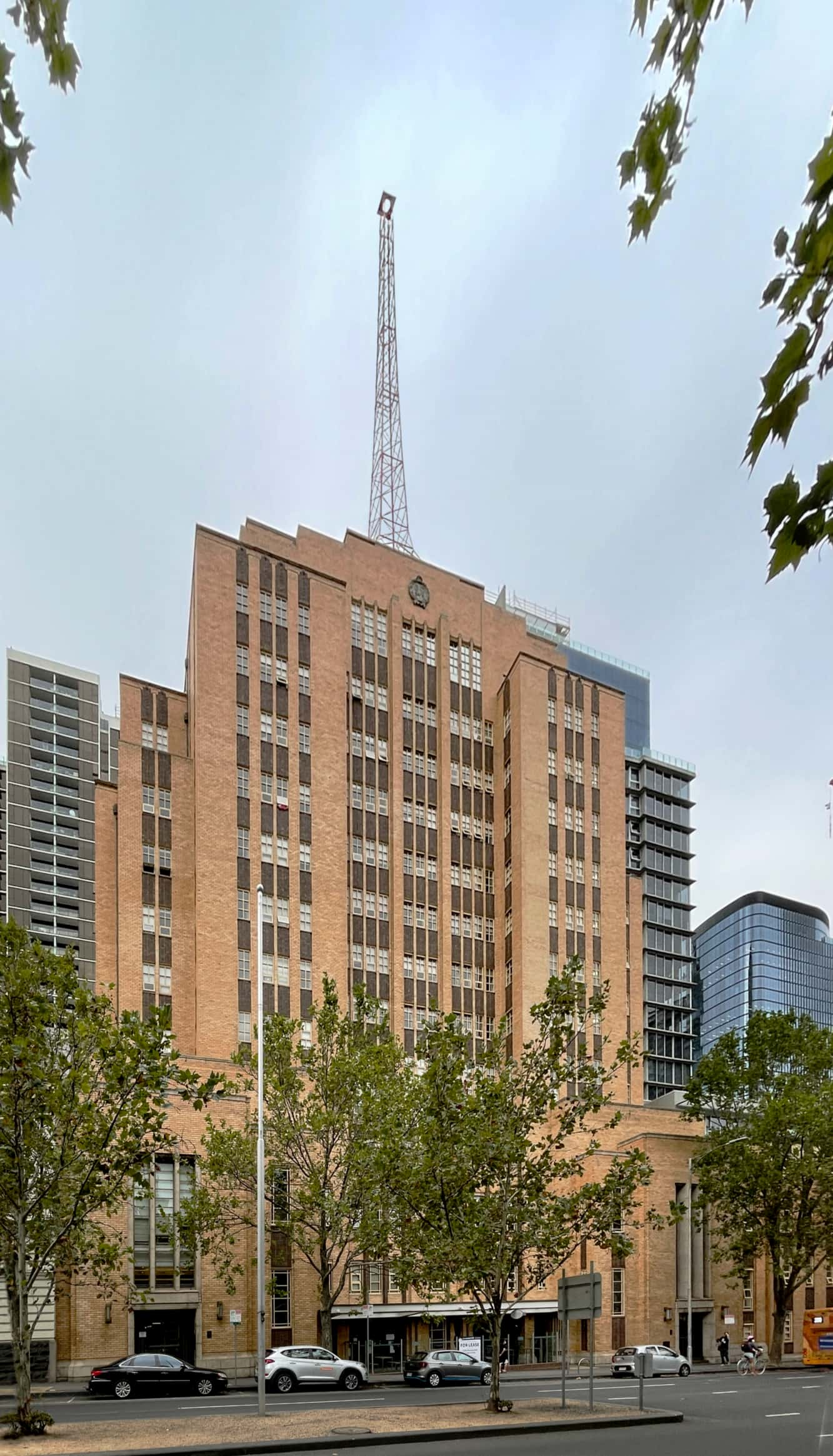
- Russell St Police Headquarters
- Interactive map of the Russell Street Police Headquarters area

General information
- Type: Moderne skyscraper style
- Architectural style: Art Deco
- Location: 336- 376 Russell Street, Melbourne, Australia
- Coordinates: 37.8082°S 144.9662°E
- Construction started: 1940
- Opened: 29 April 1943

Technical details
- Structural system: Reinforced concrete with face brick curtain walls on a plinth of Mt Difficult sandstone.
- Floor count: 16

Design and construction
- Architect: Percy Edgar Everett

Russell Street Police Headquarters was located on the north-eastern corner of Russell and La Trobe Streets, Melbourne was the headquarters of the Victoria Police through the second half of the 20th century.

The main impressive New York skyscraper style tower, recognised as a symbol of the police in Victoria, was designed by Public Works Chief Architect Percy Edgar Everett and opened on 29 April 1943. The 1940s construction also included lower wings on the corner of Russell Street and Latrobe Street, incorporating the Police Theatrette / Ballroom, while an 1889 wing on Mackenzie Street remained of the earlier police buildings, and in 1970 a large brown brick building was added behind the tower.

The main tower was famously used in the opening titles of the long-running television series Homicide, a fictional police drama series dealing with the homicide squad of the Victoria Police, who were located in the building.

The building is located in what was a police and justice precinct; across the road on Russell Street is the Old Melbourne Gaol, old City Police Station and City Courts buildings (both now occupied by the RMIT University).

The Russell Street Police Headquarters was the site of the Russell Street Bombing in 1986.

The Victoria Police vacated the building in 1995, leaving it empty for many years while several failed redevelopment proposals including conversion to student accommodation and to a hotel came and went. In 2004 the 1970s building and part of the 1940s Latrobe street wing were replaced by a new 27-storey apartment building designed by Bruce Henderson Architects. The Art Deco tower, the lower corner wing, and the 1889 wing were converted into apartments. The whole complex is now known as "Concept Blue".

== Gallery ==
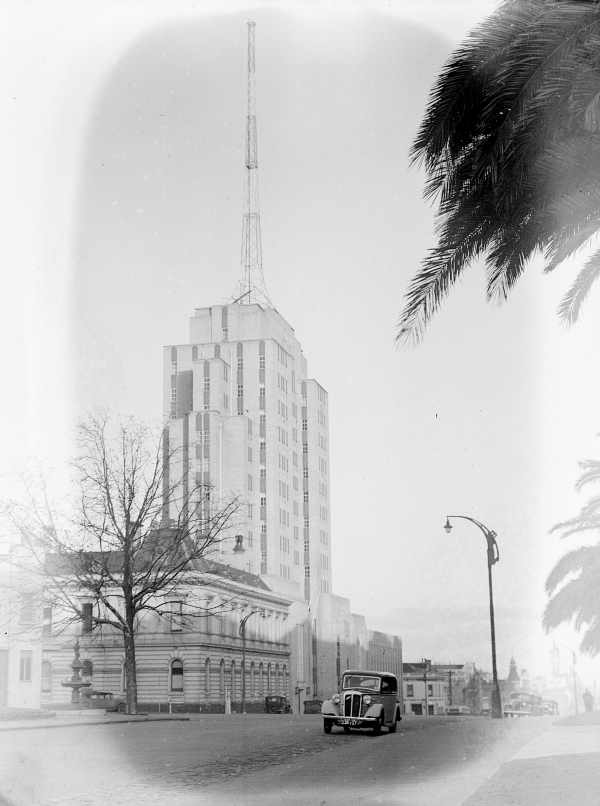
Russell St Police Headquarters

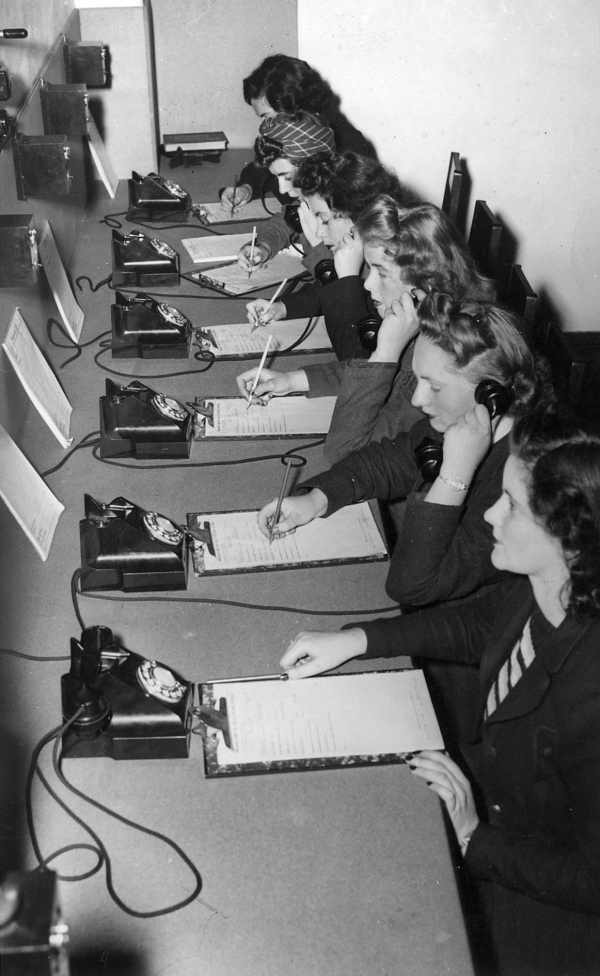
The control room for Air Raid Precautions services during World War II were located at the Russell Street police headquarters

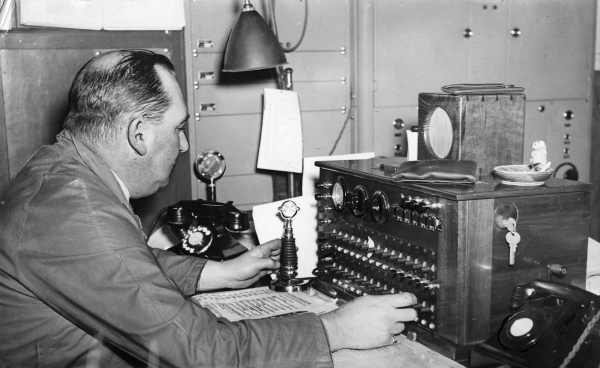
Control room during World War II.

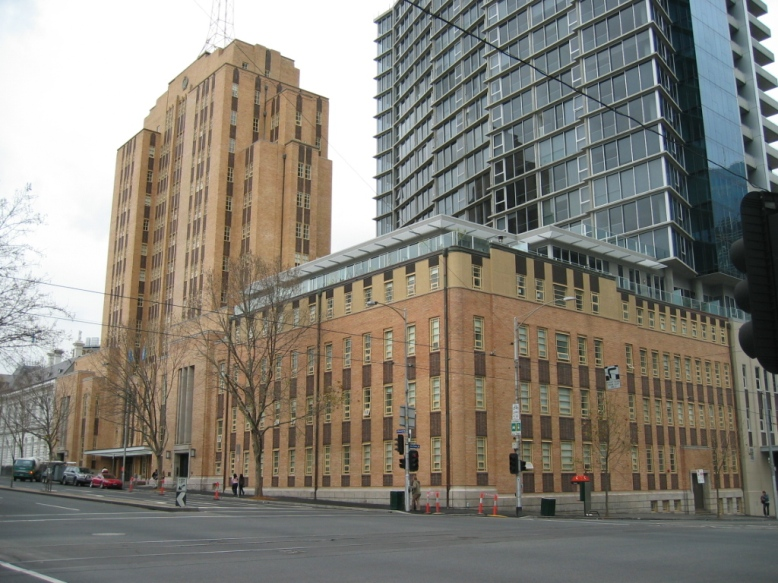
The Police building as seen from La Trobe St.

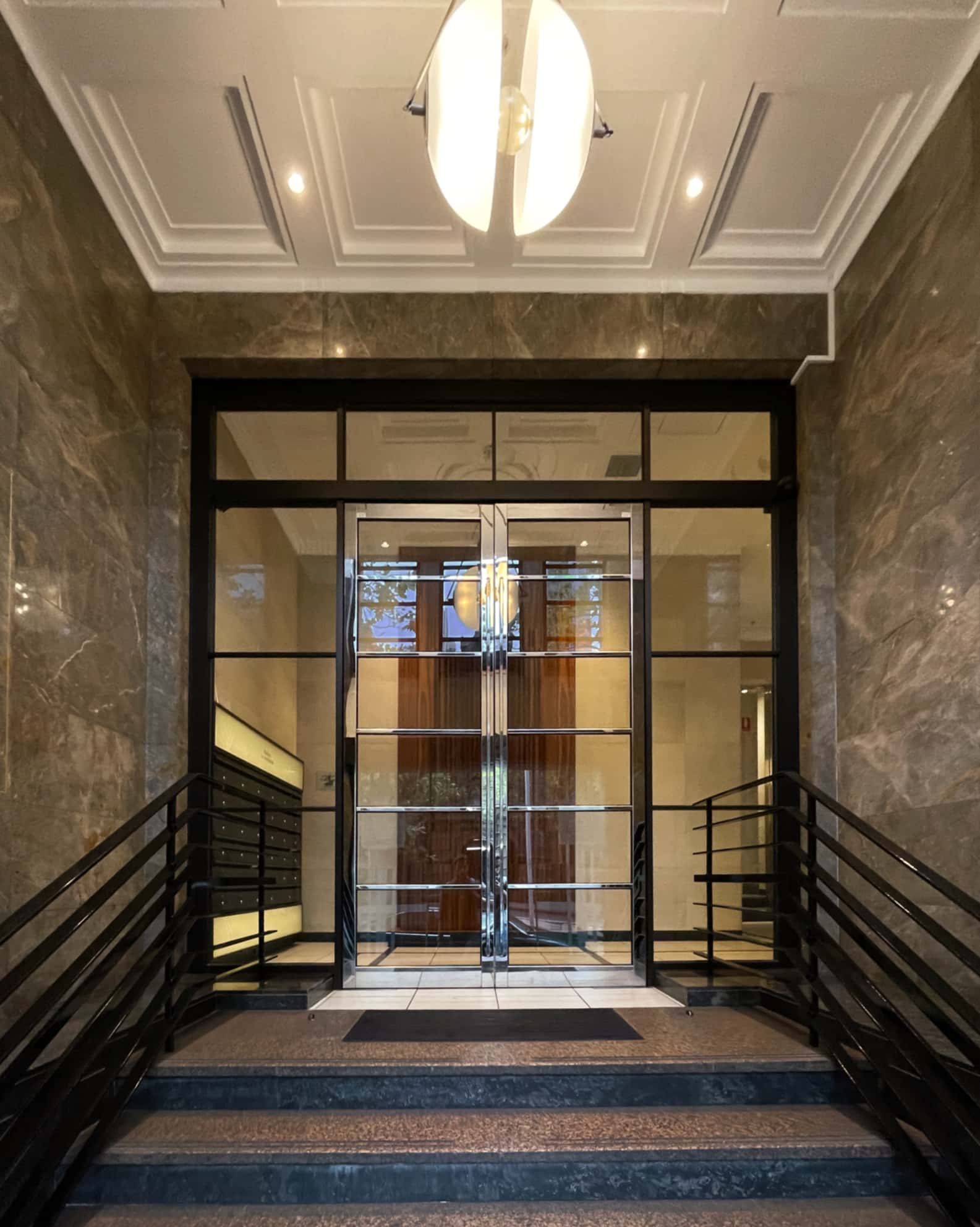
The resident entrance in the Deco Tower within the Concept Blue Apartments redevelopment of the Police HQ.

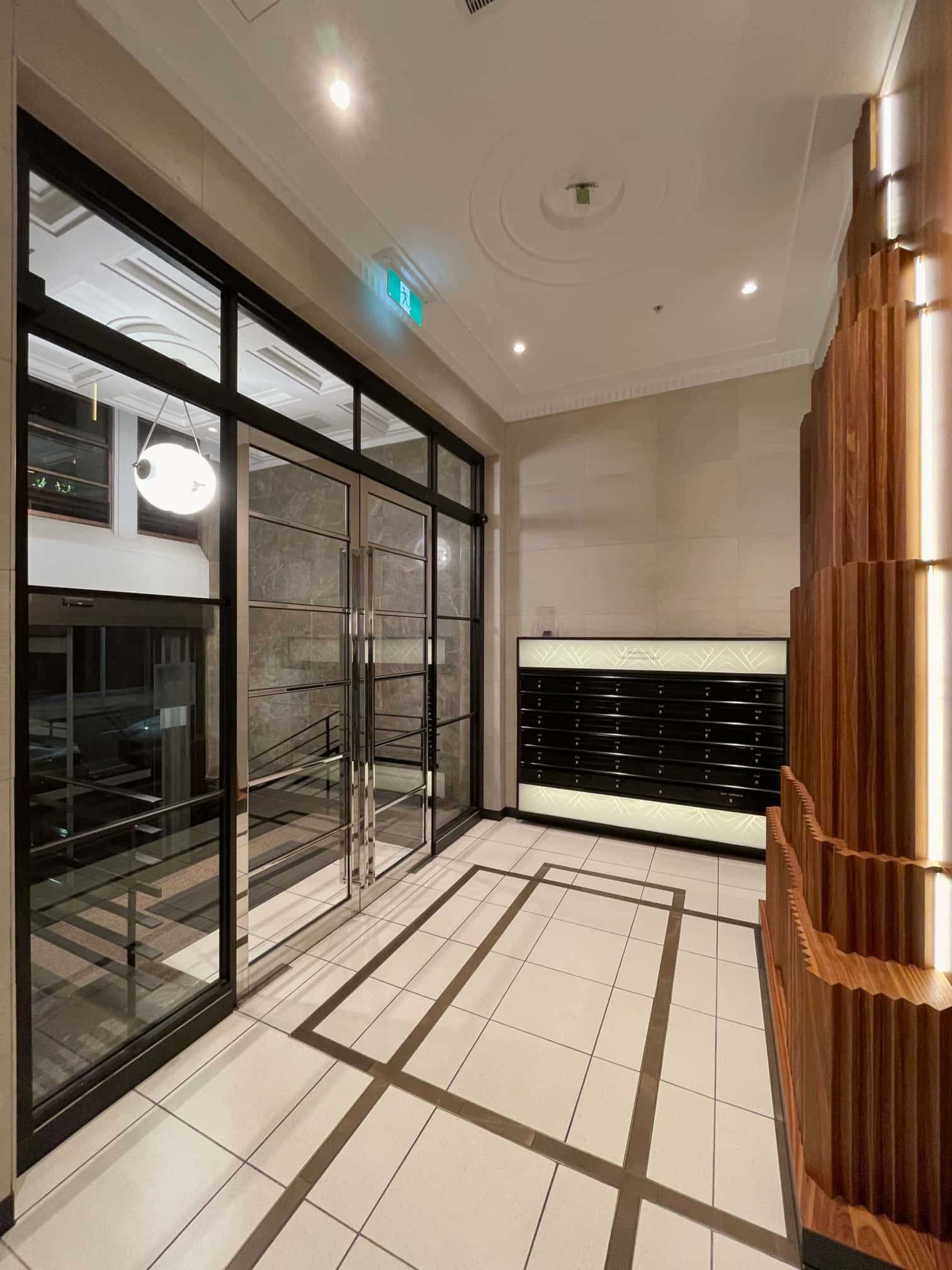
The resident lobby in the Deco Tower within the Concept Blue Apartments redevelopment of the Police HQ.

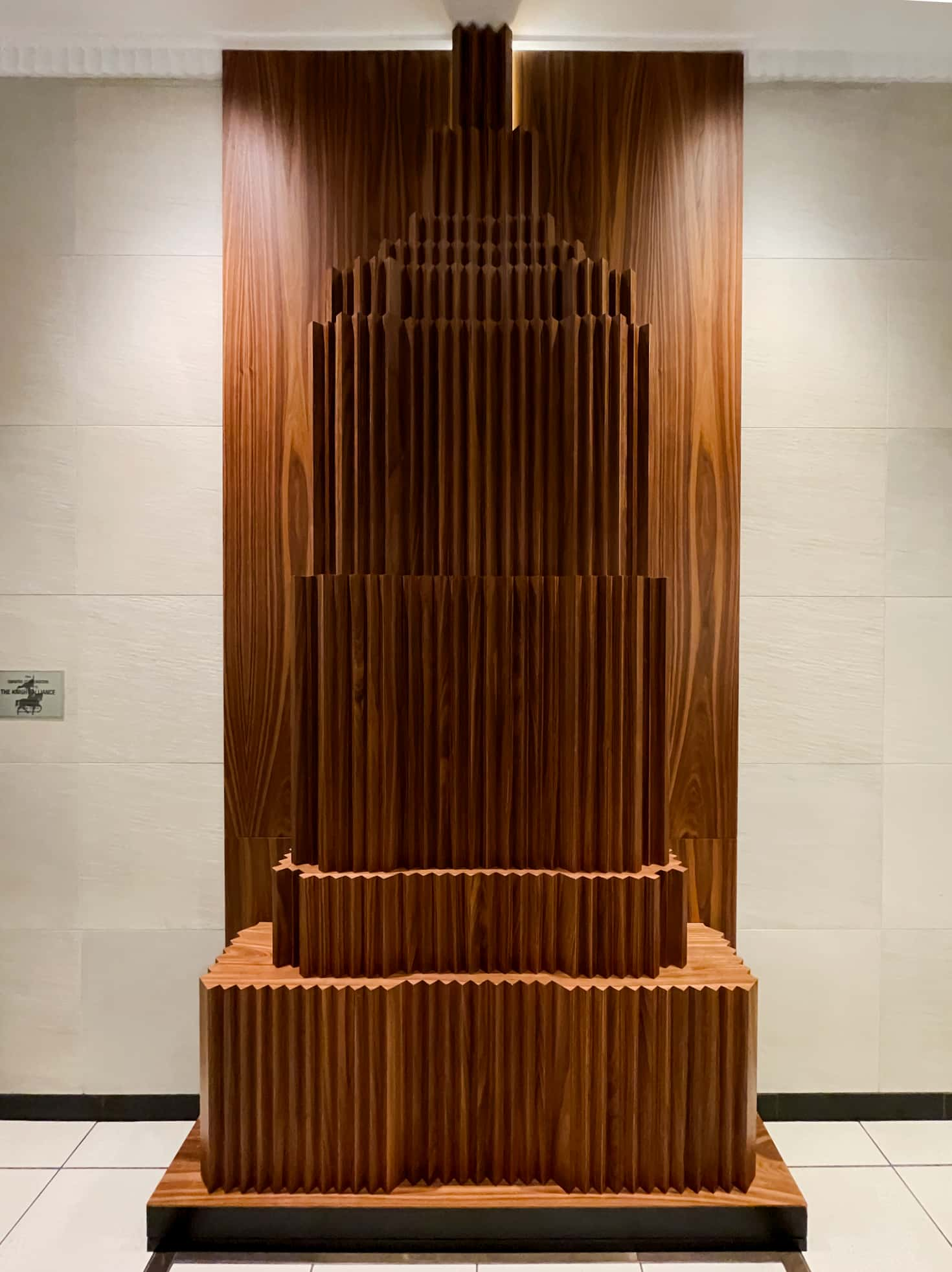
A statue of the tower itself within the resident lobby entrance in the Deco Tower.
