= Frank Tate (educator) =

Australian educationist

Frank Tate CMG
- Frank Tate (before 1910)
- Born: 18 June 1864; Near Castlemaine, Victoria
- Died: 28 June 1939 (aged 75); Caulfield, Melbourne
- Education: Castlemaine State School
- Alma mater: University of Melbourne
- Occupation: Educationalist
- Known for: Expanding secondary education in Victoria, Australia; Principal, Melbourne Training College (1900–1902); Director of Education, Victorian Department of Education (1902–1928); President, Australian Council for Educational Research (1930–1939)
- Spouse: Ada Hodgkiss (m. 1888; died 1932)

Frank Tate CMG (18 June 1864 – 28 June 1939) was an Australian educationist who is best known for his efforts in expanding secondary education in Victoria, Australia.

== Early life ==
Tate by David Low

Frank Tate was born on 18 June 1864 to Aristides Franklin Tate (better known as Henry) and his wife Mary Bessy (née Lomas) in Mopoke Gully, near Castlemaine, Victoria. Henry Tate managed gold mining companies, and was sometimes a shopkeeper. In 1873 the family moved the Melbourne.

Tate began his education at the Castlemaine state school. After moving to Melbourne he attended the Old Model School in Melbourne. In 1877, after completing his primary education, he enrolled as a pupil-teacher. At the end of the four-year training programme (in which he failed his annual examinations twice), Tate enrolled at the Training Institution for a further two years.

== Legacy ==
A Secondary Teachers College Hostel is named 'Frank Tate House'. There is also a building at The University of Melbourne's Parkville campus named after him.
