= Public Works Department (Victoria) =

Former government public works agency of Victoria, Australia

Agency overview
- Formed: 1855
- Dissolved: 1987
- Superseding agency: Ministry of Housing and Construction (Victoria)
- Jurisdiction: Government of Victoria
- Agency ID: PROV VA 669

The Public Works Department was a government agency which operated in Victoria between 1855 and 1987.

Over its long history, the department had various responsibilities, many of which were later devolved to other departments or authorities. These included:

- Building and government accommodation services and supply of stores, furniture and equipment until 1987
- Cemeteries until 1873
- Furniture and equipment up to 1987
- Licences for the occupation of unused roads and water frontages
- Local government between 1855 and 1958
- Main roads and bridges between 1877 and 1913
- Marina permits until 1987
- Metropolitan foreshores until 1956 and between 1974 and 1983
- Ports and harbours between 1900 and 1983 which, for periods of time, included fisheries and aspects of immigration and the Alfred Graving Dock
- Preservation of historic buildings until 1973, with preservation of historic government buildings continuing until 1983
- Property and accommodation management until 1985
- Tourist resorts and facilities between about 1922 and 1958
- Water supply (metropolitan) and sewerage between 1855 and 1891
- Water supply (rural) from 1860 and 1867
- Wire netting advances until 1928

The department was abolished in 1987, with all major functions taken up by the newly created Ministry of Housing and Construction (Victoria).
