= List of public art in the City of Sydney =

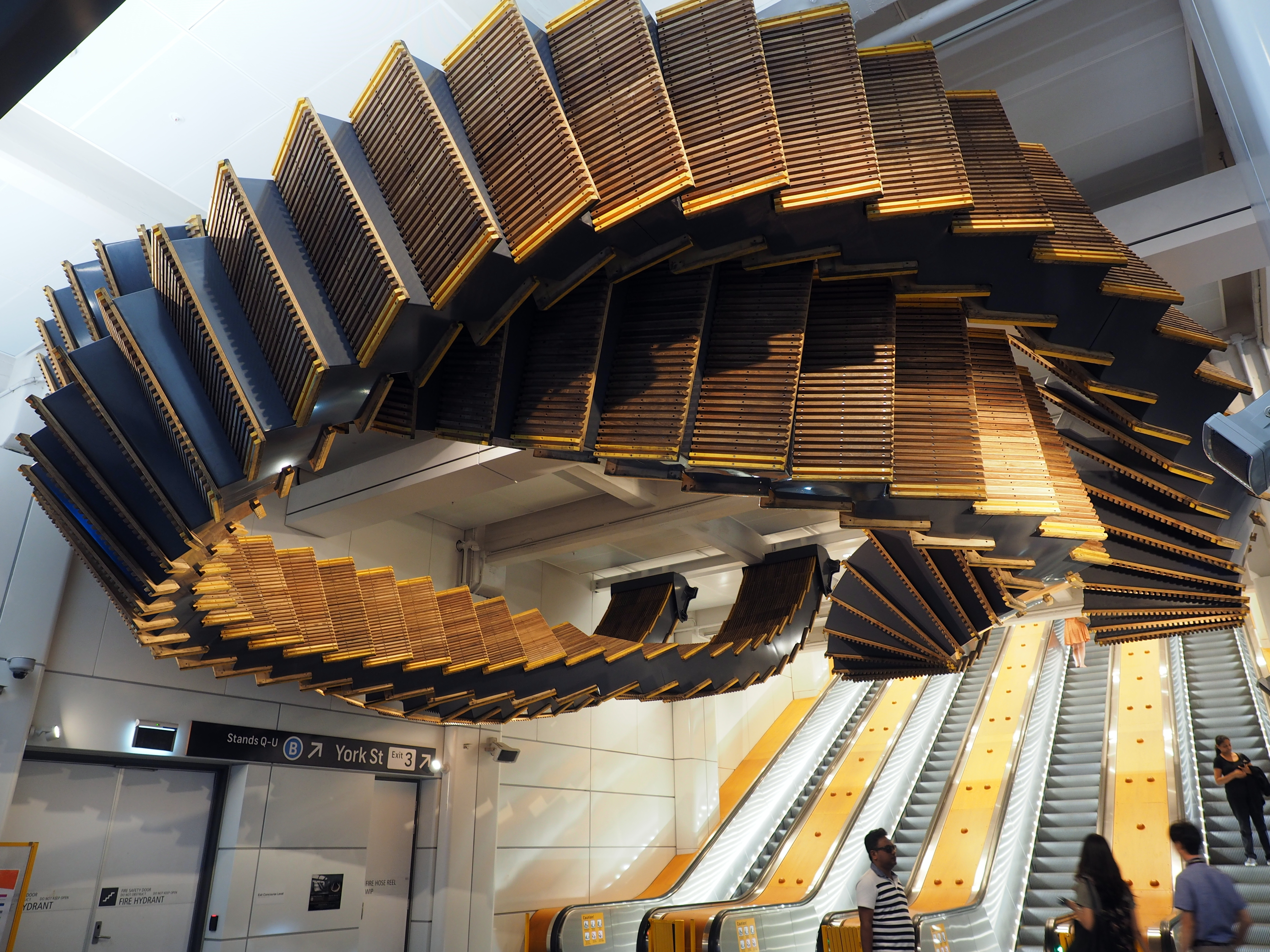
Interloop (2017) at Wynyard station

Public art in the City of Sydney in New South Wales, Australia includes a wide range of works across a range of genres and for a range of purposes or combination of purposes. Some are purely artistic, some are commemorative, some are both. Some are monuments or memorials; some are also fountains and some are site-specific. In some buildings, such as Australia Square and Grosvenor Place by Harry Seidler as well as Aurora Place by Renzo Piano, the art is a component of the architect's intentions. Occasionally, works are removed or repositioned. The City of Sydney has a Public Art Policy and conservation work is carried on from time to time to maintain the works.

The materials used vary widely but include traditional marble (such as in Touchstone) and bronze (such as in the Archibald Fountain) as well as steel (such as in New Constellation and I Stay), concrete (such as in I Wish and Barrel Roll) and newer materials like aluminium (such as in Vine and Morpho). In the 21st century, kinetic, musical, and conceptual works began to appear.

Notable sculptors from around the world are represented in works on public display in Sydney. For example, Bertram Mackennal and Bronwyn Oliver were Australian; Gilbert Bayes and Henry Moore were British; François-Léon Sicard and Henri Alfred Jacquemart were French; Alexander Calder and Jenny Holzer are American; Kan Yasuda and Jun'ya Ishigami are Japanese.

Some memorials (such as the Levy Drinking Fountain) are in the form of a fountain; others (such as William Dalley) are in the form of a portrait statue. The Lawson Memorial commemorates a writer; John Christie Wright Memorial Fountain commemorates a sculptor; the Dobell Memorial commemorates a painter, the Morshead Fountain commemorates a soldier; Il Porcellino commemorates surgeons. As well as memorials to individuals or groups, matters of importance to Sydney such as navigation and the environment are also commemorated. The bronze portraits of James Cook, Arthur Phillip and Matthew Flinders also pay tribute to their skills in exploration and navigation.

Recurring themes include flora, children and classical or abstract allusion. Local flora is represented by sculptures such as Veil of Trees, Edge of the Trees and Into the Trees II. Busby's Bore takes water as its subject; indigenous fauna is interpreted in Dancing Brolgas and domesticated animals in Trim, Islay and Mare and Foal. The lives and importance of children are acknowledged in the Tank Stream Fountain, Windlines, Youngsters and the memorial to Hans Christian Andersen. Some (such as The Offerings of Peace and The Offerings of War) employ classical references to convey an abstract meaning; others (such as Research) use abstracted forms to convey an idea.

== Scope ==
The list below is of works whose purpose is at least partly artistic and located in the New South Wales local government area of the City of Sydney. Outside the scope of this list are objects and installations that are: located in the suburbs of Greater Sydney; primarily water features, such as the fountains in Martin Place and in the forecourt of the Sydney Opera House; purely memorial objects such as the obelisk of botanist Allan Cunningham in the Royal Botanic Garden; and temporary exhibitions containing sculptures for sale such as those displayed in the annual Sculpture by the Sea exhibition or other public spaces like Barangaroo. The list is ordered chronologically and reveals how art has moved from the "pedagogical: kings, generals, prophets and heroes on pedestals, striking poses that were supposed to demonstrate power, nobility and citizenship" to "something ... that brings a site to life, triggers engagement, prompts discussion and reflection''.

=== Nineteenth century ===
Commissions for sculpture came from three main sources: the Church, the State and the private sponsor. In the later part of the nineteenth century, there was "an active artistic relationship between Australia and Britain".

| Year | Image | Title | Artist/s | Location | Notes and references |
|---|---|---|---|---|---|
| 1842 | RichardBourkeLibraryStatue | Governor Bourke | Edward Hodges Baily | Outside the State Library of New South Wales; 33.8660°S 151.2128°E | Statue of Governor Richard Bourke, in his Lieutenant-General's uniform, unveiled on 11 April 1842 after a grand ceremonial procession. For the event, the banks and "nearly all the mercantile institutions and respectable shops were closed." Conrad Martens did a painting in oils of the statue and Sydney Harbour in 1842. The painting is now in the collections of the Mitchell Library. |
| 1850 | Statue carved by Father John, Dom Eugene Gourbeillon OSB outside St Mary's Cathedral, Sydney | Our Lady and the child Jesus | Dom Eugene Gourbeillon (OSB) | St Mary's Cathedral; 33.870752°S 151.213243°E | The sculptor was also a Benedictine priest stationed in Sydney. The statue was removed in 1912 and replaced in 2008. |
| 1857 | | Hyde Park Obelisk (Wikidata) | | Hyde Park 33.8747°S 151.21°E | A heritage-listed, 22m tall, sandstone obelisk that served as a sewer vent and is now a monument. Designed and built by the NSW Department of Public Works in Victorian Egyptian style, it was modelled on Cleopatra's Needle on the banks of London's River Thames. Located in Hyde Park at the intersection of Elizabeth Street and Bathurst Street. |
| 1866 | Albert the Good, Sydney 1 | Albert the Good (Wikidata) | William Theed | Macquarie Street; 33.8697°S 151.2121°E | Statue of Prince Albert, represented wearing the full robes and insignia of a Knight of the Garter and holding a field-marshall's baton. Originally placed in Hyde Park. He is positioned looking across Macquarie Street at Boehm's statue of his Queen. |
| 1870 | A copy in sandstone of the Choragic Monument of Lysicrates | Choragic Monument | Walter McGill | Royal Botanic Garden; 33.863930°S 151.218075°E | A smaller copy in Sydney sandstone of the Choragic Monument of Lysicrates in Athens, built in 335 or 334 BC. Originally in the garden of Sir James Martin (1820–1886), it was moved to the Royal Botanic Garden in 1943. |
| 1878 | Captain Cook | Captain Cook | Thomas Woolner | Hyde Park South, 120 Elizabeth Street; 33.874178°S 151.211915°E | A monument to the celebrated explorer James Cook. Woolner wrote: "My idea is, ... to make an animated figure filled with wonder and delight, in the moment of discovering a new country; smitten by the sun, he would always stand a shining welcome to all comers to the fair Australian land." |
| 1879 | Sculpture by Henri Alfred Jacquemart in the Royal Botanic Garden, Sydney | Huntsman and Dogs | Henri Alfred Jacquemart | Royal Botanic Garden; 33.864090°S 151.214153°E | One of two copies of an original which stood near the Garden Palace when it burned down in 1882. The copies were cast in imitation bronze. |
| 1879 | Fountain in the main pond of the Garden | Venus Fountain | | Royal Botanic Garden; 33.863967°S 151.217426°E | The original was erected prior to 1880. In 1990 it was removed and a bronze cast made of it; the replacement was erected in the same location in 1994. |
| 1883 | Statue of Thomas Sutcliffe Mort by Pierce Connolly | Thomas Sutcliffe Mort | Pierce Connolly | Macquarie Place; 33.863483°S 151.209924°E | Monument to Australian industrialist Thomas Sutcliffe Mort, who was responsible among other things, for Mort's Dock at Balmain. |
| 1883 | Charles Francis Summers "La Ballarina" (1883) in Royal Botanic Garden, Sydney | La Ballarina | Charles Francis Summers | Royal Botanic Garden 33.8642°S 151.2185°E | A copy of a famous work by Antonio Canova, one of eight brought from Italy in 1883 and put back in the Garden in 2009 after vandalisation and restoration by master mason, Jacek Luszcyk. The restored statue was unveiled in July 2009. |
| 1883 | Neoclassical sculpture in Royal Botanic Garden, Sydney One of four sculptures representing the seasons | Autumn and Winter | | Royal Botanic Garden | Two of four neoclassical sculptures representing The Four Seasons: Spring, Summer, Autumn, Winter. Both "Spring" and "Summer" had been decapitated and Summer's head had been lost. As well, various pieces were missing. The works were restored and re-placed in the Garden. |
| 1883 | Sculpture in Royal Botanic Garden, Sydney | Boy removing thorn | Copy of ancient original | Royal Botanic Garden; 33.863593°S 151.219607°E | One of many sculptural variants in marble and bronze of the Greco-Roman Boy with Thorn. |
| 1887 | Copy of a Canova in Royal Botanic Garden, Sydney Copy of a Canova in the Royal Botanic Garden, Sydney (one of a pair) | The Boxers | Charles Francis Summers (Copy of a work by Antonio Canova) | Royal Botanic Garden | The subject is two famous boxers of 400 BC. The original Canova is in the Vatican Museums. Most of the classic marble figures in the Botanic Garden, including "The Boxers" were copied from plaster models made by Charles Francis Summers (son and pupil of Charles Summers). Summers, whose "forte is the ideal", was known for copies from the antique. During a residence in Rome of 30 years he had been granted access by the Vatican authorities, and possessed "some exceedingly valuable casts." The colony at the time, "unfortunately", wrote a contemporary critic, had no example of Canova's grace. Comparing "The Boxers" unfavourably with another classical copy ("The Quoit-thrower") he said that "The 'Boxers" are "two actors from the Théâtre Français in an attitude with their clothes off." Nonetheless, he concluded that "We must not deny their excellence, however, in their own particular style." |
| 1888 | Boehm "Victoria" (Queen's Square, Sydney) | Victoria (Wikidata) | Joseph Edgar Boehm | Queen's Square; 33.869653°S 151.211831°E | Unveiled in the Centennial year of 1888, Boehm's monument to Queen Victoria can be seen in position near Hyde Park in early 20th century photographs. The Queen, dressed in brocade, wears the crown, her left hand holds the orb and cross, her right hand points the sceptre to the earth. |
| 1889 | A gift from the Levy family in memory of Lewis Wolfe Levy (1815–1885). Erected in the Royal Botanic Garden | Levy Drinking Fountain | Charles Bell Birch | Royal Botanic Garden; 33.866519°S 151.217169°E | One of the few remaining large public drinking fountains in Sydney. A young girl stands with reeds, herons and frogs. Art Nouveau in style and "...is an important example of aestheticism in Sydney". It is made from polished red and white granite; the figure is bronze. Gifted to the memory of Lewis Wolfe Levy (1815–1885) by his family. |
| 1890s | Section showing carvings of Australian explorers | Australian explorers | Various | Lands Department building, Bridge Street facade 33.863605°S 151.210183°E | The building's architect – James Barnet – placed naturalistic statues in its niches. On the Bridge Street elevation are Australian explorers, to "convey the story of the opening up of the land in the colony". Among them is a representation of John Oxley, by William Priestly MacIntosh, which was the last statue to be installed in its niche. Also featured on this elevation are Ludwig Leichhardt, Thomas Mitchell, Robert O'Hara Burke and William Hovell (by MacIntosh); and George Bass (by James White). |
| 1890 | Memorial to J.D. Lang by Giovanni Fontana | John Dunmore Lang | Giovanni Fontana | Wynyard Park; 33.865345°S 151.206045°E | Bronze memorial to John Dunmore Lang, founder of the Presbyterian Church in Australia, unveiled 26 January 1891 by his widow in the presence of Sir John Robertson, Sir Henry Parkes and the Earl of Jersey, among many others. |
| 1891 | Bronze sculpture in the Royal Botanic Garden, Sydney | Mare and Foal | Arthur le Duc | Royal Botanic Garden; 33.863751°S 151.218882°E | Purchased by the Art Gallery of New South Wales and donated to the Garden in 1958. |
| c1893 | Sandstone sculpture of William Cunningham by Tomaso Sani | Allan Cunningham | Tomaso Sani | Lands Building | Portrait of botanist Allan Cunningham, depicted with his hand resting on a column of waratahs. One of a series of sandstone sculptures in the niches of the facades of Lands Building. They are all of a uniform size – 200 cm x 60 x 50 (9 ft 6 ins tall). They were cleaned and refurbished in 1979/80 by the Public Works Department. |
| 1897 | Bronze sculpture of William Bede Dalley in Hyde Park, Sydney | William Bede Dalley | James White | Hyde Park | Bronze over life-size likeness of William Bede Dalley, whose unveiling on Easter Tuesday 1897 was reportedly attended by 10,000 people. A critic wrote that the sculptor "was cruelly handicapped by the stumpy figure and square-jawed face of his subject (however beloved and talented – and he was both!) ..." |
| 1897 | Commemorating Captain (and Governor) Arthur Phillip. Completed 1897 | The Governor Phillip Fountain and statue | Achille Simonetti | Royal Botanic Garden 33.864851°S 151.213370°E | Full length statue of the first governor of New South Wales atop a marble column around which are various figures both allegorical (e.g. Justice, Commerce) and mythical (e.g. Neptune, Cyclops). Commissioned by State Premier Henry Parkes during the 1888 Centennial celebrations and unveiled by Lord Hampden for Queen Victoria's Diamond Jubilee. |
| 1898 | QVB Statue 2 | Guardian Genius of the City | William Priestly MacIntosh | Queen Victoria Building; 33.871737°S 151.206830°E | One of a pair of architectural sculptures for the new Queen Victoria Markets building. Tenders were called and MacIntosh was awarded the commission. |
| 1899 | QVB Statue 1 | Guardian Genius of Civilisation | William Priestly MacIntosh | Queen Victoria Building (York Street); 33.871739°S 151.206559°E | One of a pair of architectural sculptures for the new Queen Victoria Markets building. Tenders were called and MacIntosh was awarded the commission. |
| 1899 | White (1899) "Lady of Commerce" | Lady of Commerce | James White | 56 Pitt Street | Bronze sculpture 15 feet 6 inches in height outside the Royal Exchange Building, formerly on the roof of the now demolished stock exchange building. The sculpture was regarded as marking "a new development in the history of Sculptural art in Australia" and was made "in the manner of" the statue of "Liberty" in New York. "Commerce is represented by an ideal female figure standing upon the globe on either side of which are placed emblems of the staple industries of the State — sheaves of wheat, miners' tools, ram's head and skin, and an anchor — and holding in her left hand the Caduceus of Mercury, the accepted symbol of commerce, and in her right, a branch of laurel." |

=== Twentieth century ===
By the twentieth century, the "basic traditional concepts of sculpture were challenged and radically undermined" giving rise to modern sculpture.

| Year | Image | Title | Artist/s | Location | Notes and references |
|---|---|---|---|---|---|
| 1904 | Sculpture of John Robertson in The Domain, Sydney | John Robertson | designed by John Horbury Hunt, executed by James White | The Domain; 33.867772°S 151.216249°E | The bronze life-sized statue in memory of five-times Premier Robertson was funded by public subscription and unveiled on 24 September 1904. Them pedestal is of trachyte with a rock faced shaft and "classical leaf cornice capping". It bears the inscription "Sir John Robertson, K.C.M.G. Patriot, Statesman, Prime Minister of New South Wales 1817–1891." |
| 1905 | Bronze monument to Robert Burns by F. W. Pomeroy, Sydney | Robert Burns (Wikidata) | Frederick Pomeroy | The Domain; 33.869629°S 151.214844°E | Monument to Scottish poet Robert Burns. A committee representing the Scottish associations in the State, and presided by Sir Normand MacLaurin, collected funds to erect a memorial in honour of the poet. Burns anniversary services were held near the statue. |
| 1905 | Iron anchor from the ship "Sirius" installed in Macquarie Place, Sydney | Sirius Anchor | Unknown | Macquarie Place Park; 33.862979°S 151.210208°E | Iron anchor from the Sirius, flagship of the First Fleet, recovered off Norfolk Island. An artefact functioning as an art work. |
| 1907 | Fountain in Sydney Hospital | Robert Brough Monument | | Sydney Hospital; 33.867988°S 151.212793°E | A painted cast-iron three-tiered fountain in memory of actor Robert Brough. A group of brolgas is surmounted by black swans with crimson beaks. The sculpture was cast in the Colebrookdale Factory in England. |
| 1908 | Queen Victoria | Statue of Queen Victoria (Wikidata) | John Hughes | Queen Victoria Building; 33.872718°S 151.206851°E | Made and installed originally in Ireland, the statue was moved to Sydney and inaugurated on 20 December 1987 by Queen Elizabeth II |
| 1912 | Lion (RBG) Lioness (RBG) | Lion and Lioness | | Royal Botanic Garden, outside Lion Gate Lodge | A pair of bronze lions donated to the Botanic Garden in 1912 from the estate of Edward Sanders. Restored in 1989 and returned in 1990. Popular with children for generations. |
| 1919 | | HMAS Sydney I - SMS Emden Memorial (Wikidata) | | Hyde Park 33.8765°S 151.2119°E | Heritage-listed former foreign naval ship gun of the Imperial German Navy's SMS Emden, and now war memorial and war trophy located on the corner of Liverpool and College Streets. The Commonwealth Government offered the gun to the City of Sydney as a gift in 1917, as HMAS Sydney I had been the one to sink the Emden. |
| 1922 | King Edward VII monument, Sydney (3365870229) | Edward VII | Thomas Brock | Corner of Macquarie and Bridge Streets; 33.863243°S 151.213162°E | Bronze equestrian memorial statue on sandstone plinth. Funded by public subscription, the City of Sydney, and the State Government, it was unveiled on Empire Day,12 years after the King's death. |
| 1923 | Bronze sculpture by Gilbert Bayes "Offerings of Peace" | The Offerings of Peace (Wikidata) | Gilbert Bayes | Art Gallery of New South Wales 33.868733°S 151.216766°E | Companion piece to Offerings of War outside the Gallery. The models for the works are the Elgin Marbles, and the rider carrys Greek theatre masks of Tragedy and Comedy, representing "the arts" and "plenty". The inscription on the base reads: The Real and Lasting Victories Are those of Peace and Not of War. |
| 1923 | Bronze sculpture "Offerings of War" by Gilbert Bayes | The Offerings of War (Wikidata) | Gilbert Bayes | Art Gallery of New South Wales 33.868400°S 151.217137°E | Companion piece to Offerings of Peace outside the Gallery. The rider holds a staff, a bundle of swords and broken spear shafts. The inscription on the base reads: That our House may stand forever and that Justice and Mercy grow. |
| 1924 | Sculpture of satyr by Frank Lynch, Royal Botanic Garden, Sydney | The Satyr | Frank Lynch | Royal Botanic Garden; 33.8586°S 151.2153°E | Bronze cast of an original first exhibited in 1924, "...modelled from the artist's brother, whose death inspired Kenneth Slessor to write Five Bells." The sculpture was subsequently considered too pagan to be on public display. In storage until placed in the Royal Botanic Garden in 1977. |
| 1925 | Colton work in Sydney | Matthew Flinders | William Robert Colton | Macquarie Street, outside the Mitchell Library; 33.866351°S 151.212660°E | Statue of Matthew Flinders, navigator who explored and charted the coast of Australia. In consequence of Sir Flinders Petrie's 1922 offer of his grandfather's papers to the first State in Australia to erect a statue in Matthew's honour, Flinders' papers are now part of the Mitchell Library collection. |
| 1925 | Monument to Richard Johnson, Sydney's first chaplain | Richard Johnson Obelisk | Burcham Clamp and Finch | Richard Johnson Square, Bligh Street; 33.86611°S 151.21000°E | Sandstone Gothic style tower with Celtic cross erected on the site of the first church erected in Australia, opened on 25 August 1793. Richard Johnson came with the First Fleet and was the first chaplain in the colony. |
| 1926 | Shakespeare and his characters, Sydney | Shakespeare Memorial | Bertram Mackennal | Shakespeare Place 33.865897°S 151.213588°E (opposite entrance to the Mitchell Library) | Bronze memorial statue of William Shakespeare standing above representations of some characters from his tragedies (Romeo, Juliet, Othello, and Portia) and Falstaff from one of his comedies and two of his histories. Unveiled in 1926, repositioned in 1959. |
| 1928 | Statue of Moran by Bertram Mackennal outside St Mary's Cathedral, Sydney | Cardinal Moran | Bertram Mackennal | St Mary's Cathedral (south entrance); 33.871785°S 151.213192°E | Statue of Patrick Francis Moran (the third Roman Catholic Archbishop of Sydney) was unveiled by Cardinal Cerretti before an estimated quarter of a million people. Mackennal began work on this and its companion statue of Archbishop Kelly on his return to England from Australia in 1926. |
| 1929 | Cenotaph in Martin Place, Sydney, with the General Post Office entrance behind | Cenotaph (Wikidata) | Bertram Mackennal | Martin Place; 33.867544°S 151.207781°E | Cenotaph commissioned to commemorate Australian soldiers and sailors killed in World War I. |
| 1931 | Memorial to Henry Lawson by George W. Lambert (1931) in The Domain, Sydney | Henry Lawson Memorial | George W. Lambert | The Domain; 33.865876°S 151.219292°E | Bronze memorial to writer Henry Lawson. Henry's son Jim was the model for his father's figure, and Conrad von Hagen posed as the swagman. Unveiled on 28 July 1931 by New South Wales Governor Sir Philip Game. |
| 1931 | StMarysCathedral Sepia05 UnknownSoldier GWLambert | Recumbent Soldier (Unknown Soldier) | George W. Lambert, Arthur Murch | St Mary's Cathedral | Commissioned by the Roman Catholic Church for £1200. Modelled in plaster using Sten Snekker as the model and co-signed by Murch. Cast in bronze in London. Portrays a soldier in an accurately rendered uniform with a natural expression, in a style between realism and idealism. |
| 1932 [1926] | Archibald Fountain | J.F. Archibald Memorial Fountain (Wikidata) | François-Léon Sicard | Hyde Park; 33.870969°S 151.211766°E | Art Deco fountain installed as a commemoration of Australia engagements in World War I in France. The central figure is Apollo; included among the other figures are Theseus and Diana. Finished in 1926 but not installed until 1932. |
| 1933 | Statue of Kelly by Bertram Mackennal outside St Mary's Cathedral, Sydney | Archbishop Kelly | Bertram Mackennal | St Mary's Cathedral, (south entrance); 33.871778°S 151.213307°E | Mackennal's bronze statue of Archbishop Kelly is a pair with one of Cardinal Moran by the same sculptor outside St Mary's Cathedral. Unveiled on 5 March 1933 in the presence of thousands of people and described as a "splendid life likeness". |
| 1934 | ANZACWarMemorial3 gobeirne | Sacrifice | Rayner Hoff | Anzac Memorial (Hyde Park); 33.875687°S 151.210888°E | Once described as "Sydney's most moving example of publicly visible sculpture". The soldier is "surrounded by a circle of bronze paving symbolising flames". He is supported by three women who represent his mother, his sister and his wife and child. Their heads are bowed and they are presented in the form of a column. The bronze casting is described as "superb". |
| 1938 | "Cupid" Royal Botanic Garden, Sydney | Eros | Paul Montford | Royal Botanic Garden 33.864994°S 151.213926°E | Bronze fountain of "Eros" or "Cupid" in the Memorial Garden to Pioneers on the site of the Garden Palace dome. The sculpture is in the middle of a pool of water which is part of the composition. |
| 1942 | Part of one of four doors (two pairs) leading to the vestibule of the Mitchell Library, Sydney by Arthur Fleischmann | Portico Doors | Arthur Fleischmann | State Library Library of New South Wales; 33.866091°S 151.213291°E | One bronze door of two pairs that illustrate elements of Australian history at the entrance to the Mitchell library. Donated in memory of David Scott Mitchell, after whom the building is named, by Sir William Dixson, one of the other major benefactors to the library. Principal librarian William Ifould supported the idea of "panels illustrating scenes from the lives of Australian Aboriginal people". The doors were first modelled in plaster by Wunderlich and the company returned them to the Library in 1973. |
| 1946 | Stone sculpture in the Royal Botanic Garden, Sydney | I Wish | Arthur Fleischmann | Royal Botanic Garden; 33.8656°S 151.2177°E | Bust and hands of a girl, formed of pink concrete and placed on a sandstone plinth engraved with the title of the work. Commissioned by Leo Buring. It is located on the site of Sydney's first "Wishing Tree", a Norfolk Island pine. |
| 1952 | Bronze bust of Arthur Phillip, first Governor of NSW, by Jean Hill, outside the Museum of Sydney | Captain Arthur Phillip R.N. | Jean Hill | Museum of Sydney (forecourt); 33.863635°S 151.211424°E | Bronze bust of Governor Phillip, originally in First Fleet Park, Circular Quay. Unveiled in present location in 2014 in commemoration of the 200th anniversary of Phillip's death. |
| 1956 | Australia as a federation of states sculpture by Gerald Lewers (1956)-2012 | Australia as a Federation of States | Gerald Lewers | York Street; 33.870871°S 151.206470°E | Sandstone relief on the facade the Commonwealth Bank building. |
| 1959 | SAM 0505 | Research | Tom Bass | Moore Steps, (Circular Quay East); 33.863411°S 151.209796°E | A tribute to industry and scientific research, commissioned by Imperial Chemical Industries (ICI). It presents "symbolic figures representing aspects of science and technology looking to the heavens..." and has since been relocated from the company's former headquarters on Macquarie Street. |
| 1960 | Memorial Fountain by Gerald Lewers in Macquarie Place, Sydney | John Christie Wright Memorial Fountain | Gerald Lewers | Macquarie Place Park; 33.863411°S 151.209796°E | Curved copper bowl with overflowing water from single jet, erected in memory of sculptor John Christie Wright, who had been Art Instructor at the Teachers' College in Sydney University and Principal of the South Australian School of Arts and Crafts. He was killed in action in France in May 1917, during World War I. Restored in 2012. |
| 1960 | Tom Bass Sydney | Amicus Certus | Tom Bass | Alfred Street, Sydney; 33.861944°S 151.211338°E | The full text of the proverb is Amicus certus in re incerta cernitur, which translates from the Latin as "A true friend in uncertain times", and is the motto of AMP. The sculpture is fixed on the Quay Quarter Tower. |
| 1961 | El Alamein Fountain | El Alamein Fountain (Wikidata) | Robert Woodward | Fitzroy Garden, Kings Cross; 33.8729052882°S 151.2249990750°E | Commemorates the Australian involvement in the First and Second Battle of El Alamein. Rare commemoration of battle rather than individual participants. Award-winning and influential design. |
| 1961 | Fountain with three sandstone figures, representing Earth, Water and Fire, flanked on the right hand side by a font, covered with ceramic tiles formed in pre-cast concrete | FJ Walker Memorial Fountain | Gerard Hevekes | Hyde Park North; 33.872261°S 151.212450°E | Private monument in tribute to business leader Frederic Joseph Walker and "all those who pioneered primary industry in Australia". A fountain plus three sandstone figures depicting Water (represented as a fisherman); Fire (represented as a woman); and Earth (represented as a farmer). |
| 1962 | Fountain in Hyde Park Sydney | Busby's Bore Fountain | John Byrom | Hyde Park North; 33.870453°S 151.211021°E | Commemorating Busby's Bore, "Sydney's sole source of water until 1859". |
| 1962 | Hilder (1964) "Wall Enrichment" | Wall Enrichment | Bim Hilder | Reserve Bank, Martin Place | Copper and bronze work set high on marble wall. Hilder is quoted as saying it forms "an integrating and disintegrating galaxy, representative of the manner in which nations and communities come together, and separate". |
| 1963 | Sculpture by Tom Bass (1963) in Hunter Street, Sydney | P&O Fountain | Tom Bass | 55 Hunter Street 33.866377°S 151.210193°E | A wall-mounted sculpture that in 1963 was satirised on the cover of Oz magazine as a public urinal and "enjoys a kind of celebrity status as a landmark." The sculptor defended the magazine, saying it was "fair comment". |
| 1963 | Deutsche Bank Place Tom Bass | AGC sculpture | Tom Bass | Deutsche Bank Place 33.866828°S 151.211540°E | Moved from its original location and installed in its current one after restoration. |
| 1964 | Sydney Margel Hinder | Free-Standing Sculpture | Margel Hinder | Martin Place 33.868039°S 151.211731°E | Non-representational work c.5 metres high resulting from Hinder's winning competition entry in 1962. Technically difficult to instal and aesthetically difficult against the "distracting" effects of the white marble pillar on the building behind it. |
| 1966 | Memorial Fountain erected in remembrance of Lieutenant General Sir Leslie Morshead | The Morshead Fountain | Robert Woodward | Shakespeare Place 33.865555°S 151.213399°E | Erected "in remembrance of Lieutenant General Sir Leslie Morshead KCB, CMC, DSO, ED and all who served with him 1914–1918 1939–1945." |
| 1967 | Alexander Calder's work in Australia Square, Sydney | Crossed Blades | Alexander Calder | Australia Square (below the Tower Building) | Commissioned by Harry Seidler, architect of the building outside which the sculpture is installed. An example of Seidler's way of relating architecture and sculpture. During conservation treatment, it was discovered that "some of the original bolt heads have a C for Calder on them". |
| 1967 | | Kippax Lake statue | Diana Hunt | Kippax Lake, Moore Park 33.88943°S 151.2217095°E | A fountain and sculpture "in recognition of the achievements of Australian Sportswomen". |
| 1968 [1547] | Il Porcellino | Il Porcellino | Pietro Tacca | Sydney Hospital 33.867898°S 151.212376°E | A popular memorial to Thomas and Piero Fiaschi, honorary surgeons at the hospital. The boar is a replica of Tacca's 1547 original Porcellino, located at the Loggia del Mercato Nuovo in Florence. |
| 1973 | | Salute to Five Bells | John Olsen | Sydney Opera House Concert hall | A mural in "tribute to poet Kenneth Slessor who died two years before it was completed". The manuscript journal Olsen kept while working on the painting is in the National Library of Australia (MS 8015/2). |
| 1977 | Steel sculpture by Charles Perry in MLC Centre, Sydney | S | Charles Perry | 25 Martin Place | Yellow steel sculpture in curvilinear form that seems to vary in composition as the viewer walks around it. |
| 1977 | Aluminium sculpture on wall overlooking MLC Plaza in Sydney | Wrestling | Josef Albers | Wall overlooking MLC Centre plaza 33.867854°S 151.209313°E | An op-art puzzle relief in aluminium high on a wall. |
| 1978 | Weathering steel sculpture o | Flippant Flurry | Clement Meadmore | Art Gallery Road; 33.8684°S 151.217711°E | A weathered steel sculpture acquired for the collection of the Art Gallery of New South Wales in 1979 that has been described as "a tour de force in which parts barely touch and casually levitate". |
| 1979 | Dumas (1979) "The Settlers" | First Impressions | Bud Dumas | Rocks Square, The Rocks | "The Settlers", one part of a three-sided sculpture in Sydney sandstone representing people who established the new colony in Sydney. They other two sides show "The Soldier" and "The Convict". Commissioned by the Sydney Cove Redevelopment Authority and presented by the Fellowship of First Fleeters. |
| 1979 | Pyramid Tower Sydney 01 | Pyramid Tower (Wikidata) | Herbert Flugelman | Spring Street 33.864796°S 151.208866°E | Presented to the people of Sydney by the Sir William Dobell Art Foundation in his memory. Originally located in Martin Place; moved to present position in 1999. The work is affectionately known as the "Silver Shish Kebab" |
| 1980 | Sculpture by Moore (AGNSW) | Reclining Figure: Angles (Wikidata) | Henry Moore | Art Gallery of New South Wales; 33.868206°S 151.217351°E | Bronze of a reclining woman, a subject and form commonly sculpted by Moore. |
| 1980 | Bonds of Friendship | Bonds of Friendship | John Robinson | Jessie Street Gardens; 33.862142°S 151.2099°E | Memorial to the First Fleet symbolised by large burnished brass rings linked in a chain. The sculpture symbolises the close bonds between the cities of Portsmouth and Sydney as a result of the voyage. The plinth was donated by the Fellowship of First Fleeters. The granite block above the plinth was quarried in Dartmoor, England and donated to the City of Sydney. |
| 1981 | Fountain in Herald Square Sydney by Stephen Walker Detail of the Tank Stream Fountain near Circular Quay, Sydney, showing native animals playing in the pools | Tank Stream Fountain | Stephen Walker | Herald Square (near Circular Quay); 33.861373°S 151.208557°E | Also known as the Children's Fountain, the work is dedicated to "all the children who have played around the Tank Stream". A series of separate linked pools, it uses both figurative and non-figurative forms, and includes "an array of Australian flora and fauna, such as frogs, snakes, goannas, echidnas, crabs, birds and tortoises [which] appear to be playing in the pools." |
| 1986 | Sculpture in The Domain, Sydney | Mobius Sea | Richard Goodwin | The Domain; 33.869152°S 151.216287°E | Goodwin said he would describe his sculpture "as a cylindrical tower of white concrete panels, rather like a Tower of Babel, with a sea of figures spiralling towards the top. It is symbolic of the human struggle for survival; a sort of journey through life or a depiction of time, metaphorically." The work is 500 x 450 cm. |
| 1987 | Snape "The Change" (1987) | The Change | Michael Snape | Walsh Bay; 33.856856°S 151.203559°E | Blue plate steel shapes. The artist is described as "iconoclastic and irreverent, treating sculpture with a lighthearted and improvisatory dash." |
| 1987 | Sculpture of Queen Victoria's pet by Justin Robson (1987) | Islay | Justin Robson | Queen Victoria Building (Druitt and George Streets); 33.872627°S 151.206584°E | A bronze of Queen Victoria's pet Skye Terrier called Islay, modelled from a sketch done by the Queen in 1842. The sculpture sits in a sandstone wishing well in which a stone from the battlements of Blarney Castle is embedded and the recorded voice of John Laws asks for donations which are given to the deaf and blind children of New South Wales. |
| 1987 | Stella "Cones and Pillars" (Part 2) | Cones and Pillars | Frank Stella | Grosvenor Place | A three part wall mounted sculpture using oil paint on magnesium, a "dynamic and colourful presence" in the building's foyer. One of the collaborations between architect Harry Seidler and artists. |
| 1987 | Bird-Totem | Bird Totem | Adrian Mauriks | National Bank Building Plaza George and Jamison Streets; 33.864165°S 151.207087°E | Bronze. Commissioned by the AMP Society. Unveiled 1988. |
| 1987 | Clark "Governor Bligh" (1987) | Governor Bligh | Marc Clark | George and Argyle Streets, near Cadman's Cottage; 33.859204°S 151.209180°E | Bronze sculpture representing Governor William Bligh. Unveiled 18 December 1987. Clark is quoted as saying that he has "yet to find any material that gives me so much satisfaction as bronze." |
| 1988 | Pioneer Women's Memorial in Jessie Street Garden | Pioneer Women's Memorial | Alex Koloszy | Jessie Street Square, Loftus Street | The memorial to the pioneering women of Australia comprises two bronze statues. Located in the garden named after Jessie Street. It shows a mother in realistic clothing with two children who are pointing eagerly. |
| 1988 | Sculpture in Australia Square, Sydney | Waiting | John Seward Johnson II | Australia Square | Life size realistic bronze of a person engaged in an everyday activity, typical of Johnson's work. |
| 1988 | ChineseGardenidney5 | Dragon Wall | Ceramic artists from Guandong Province, China | Chinese Garden | A ceramic wall 4 metres high x 7 metres wide depicting two dancing dragons, playing with the "pearl of prosperity". Installed as part of the Australian Bicentenary celebrations. |
| 1988 | ChineseGardenidney5 | Angled Wheels of Fortune | Dennis Wolanski | 33.8729392°S 151.2252548°E | |
| 1990 | ChineseGardenidney5 | Second World War Servicewomen Memorial | Dennis Adams | Jessie Street Garden, Loftus Street; 33.8625078°S 151.2101196°E | Statue in bronze of a uniformed woman standing in front of a sandstone wall featuring various insignia of military divisions in which women served in World War II. Dedicated to "the wartime servicewomen of New South Wales". The artist served in the AIF and the sculpture was unveiled by Rear Admiral Sir David Martin. |
| 1990 | Bronze portrait bust of artist Lloyd Rees in Sydney | Lloyd Rees | Lawrence Beck | Outside the Sydney Town Hall; 33.872966°S 151.206750°E | Bronze portrait bust of the artist Lloyd Rees (1895–1988). The inscription on the plaque set in a sandstone pedestal reads: "A City is the greatest work of art possible". |
| 1990 | | Prometheus (for Franz Kafka) | William Tucker | Art Gallery Road; 33.868344°S 151.217681°E | Bronze sculpture in the collection of the Art Gallery of New South Wales, acquired in 1990. |
| 1991 | | Almost Once (Wikidata) | Brett Whiteley | The Domain; 33.869679°S 151.217549°E | Gift of the artist to the Art Gallery of New South Wales Whiteley's work was said to be a tongue-in-cheek self-portrait: "inspired ordinariness grown out of control". |
| 1992 | Sculpture by Rodney Broad in Governor Phillip Tower, 1 Farrer Place, Sydney | Willy Willy | Rodney Broad | Governor Phillip Tower, 1 Farrer Place | Interpretation of a willy willy in the building's foyer. The inscription incised into the base reads: "His Excellency ARTHUR PHILLIP Esq, governor in Chief, landed in this Cove with the first Settlers of this country, the 24th Day of January, 1788." An example of Broad's "continued preference for bronze, and his concern with the great figurative tradition". He acquired knowledge of casting in the bronze foundries of Italy. |
| 1992 | Work by Jan Senbergs commissioned for 1 Farrer Place, Sydney | The First Bush Block | Jan Senbergs | Governor Phillip Tower, 1 Farrer Place | A work commissioned for the building. Created by Senbergs, an artist once described by Fred Williams as an "industrial surrealist". |
| 1992 | Slit drum from Ambrym, Vanuatu | Slit Drum | | Royal Botanic Garden | A slit drum from Ambrym in Vanuatu, made from Intsia bijuga, presented by the Australian Friends of Vanuatu. |
| 1992 | One of a pair outside Sheraton-on-the Park Hotel, Sydney | Angels of Hospitality | Stephen Glassborow | Entrance to Sheraton-on-the Park Hotel, Elizabeth Street | A matched pair of bronze figure sculptures by an artist who "blends the real and the abstract" and "draws inspiration from Greco-Roman ruins and art deco forms as well as contemporary abstracts". |
| 1992 | Bronze and marble monument in Sydney Square | To Sail, To Stop | Ingrid Orfali | Sydney Square, near the Town Hall | A large bronze work designed to "represent both an anchor and a ship". It commemorates the arrival of the First Fleet in Sydney Cove and also Viscount Sydney, after whom the city is named. The monument was unveiled by Queen Elizabeth II. |
| 1993 | Marble and steel sculpture by Akio Makagawa, Sydney | Night Sea Crossing | Akio Makagawa | ChifleyTower | Central sculpture with two wall sculptures in white marble and stainless steel. |
| 1994-5? | Sculpture by Trevor Weekes in Governor Macquarie Tower, Sydney | The Overseer | Trevor Weekes | Governor Macquarie Tower, 1 Farrer Place | Bronze sculpture of Governor Macquarie in classical pose holding a book. The work is 8 metres (26 ft) tall and rises from an inlaid compass on the floor. Behind the sculpture is a stylised etched relief of Macquarie's lighthouse at South Head, designed by Francis Greenway. |
| 1995 | Entry point 2 | Edge of the Trees (Wikidata) | Janet Laurence and Fiona Foley | Museum of Sydney (forecourt); 33.865275°S 151.219674°E | A "forest" of trees comprising 29 pillars of wood, steel and sandstone to symbolise first contact between Aboriginal and non-Aboriginal people at the site. |
| 1996 | Trim-the-illustrious | Trim | John Cornwell | Mitchell Library (behind the sculpture of Flinders); 33.866451°S 151.212587°E | The subject is Matthew Flinders' cat who as Flinders' pet during his voyage of 1801–1803, is notable for being the first cat to circumnavigate Australia. The sculpture was erected by public subscription of cat-lovers. |
| 1997 | Pair of bronze sphinxes, Sydney | Sphinxes | | Art Gallery of New South Wales (opposite the entrance) 33.868313°S 151.216631°E | A pair of bronze sphinxes that were a gift from the Friends of the Royal Botanic Garden, Sydney. |
| 1998 | Statue of Governor Macquarie located at The Mint, Sydney | Governor Macquarie | John Dowie | The Mint Building, Macquarie Street 33.869129°S 151.212331°E | Monumental bronze relocated to its current position in 2010. |
| 1998 | Steel sculpture of Ben Chifley by Simeon Nelson in Chifley Square, Sydney | Ben Chifley | Simeon Nelson | Chifley Square | Larger-than-life sculpture of former Prime Minister Ben Chifley, commissioned by the Sydney City Council for Chifley Square. |
| 1998 | Fountain sculpture by Terrance Plowright at Cockle Bay, Sydney | Dancing Brolgas | Terrance Plowright | Cockle Bay, Darling Harbour | Bronze fountain, one of many water features done by the artist. |
| 1998 | One of a pair of Thai bronze lions in the Royal Botanic Garden, Sydney | Thai lion | | Royal Botanic Garden | One of a pair of bronze lions ("Temple Dogs") in the Oriental Garden. Made in Thailand. Purchased in Annandale in 1977, donated by Friends of the Garden in 1998. |
| 1999 | Copper sculpture in Sydney's Royal Botanic Garden depicting folded palm fronds | Palm | Bronwyn Oliver | Royal Botanic Garden | Copper sculpture depicting folded palm fronds. Installed near Phoenix reclinata palm in the garden. Even though the artist claimed not to be interested in structures in nature, saying that her "ideas develop from the materials which I use ... and in what materials will do", natural forms are everywhere in Oliver's work and are also often the subject. |
| 1999 | Oliver "Magnolia" (1999) | Magnolia | Bronwyn Oliver | Royal Botanic Garden | Near Farm Cove, the sculpture symbolises the forms of "elemental form washed up by the tide". |
| 1999 | Sydney Famine Memorial | Australian Monument to the Great Irish Famine | Hossein and Angela Valamanesh | Hyde Park Barracks; 33.869872°S 151.212716°E | One of many memorials to the Great Famine. The names of 400 women who arrived as famine orphans are etched into the glass part of the memorial walls. |
| 1999 | Veil of Trees | Veil of Trees (Wikidata) | Janet Laurence and Jisuk Han | Royal Botanic Garden; 33.86515°S 151.219767°E | Designed as part of the Sydney Sculpture Walk program, it highlights the indigenous botanical history of the site. |
| 1999 | Artwork set in Sydney's pavements marking the course of the Tank Stream | Tank Stream – Into the head of the Cove | Lynne Roberts-Goodwin | Bridge Street and Tank Stream Way; 33.863659°S 151.208594°E | Artwork made of coloured glass modules and stainless steel lines set into the pavement in five place to mark the watercourse of the Tank Stream river. Etched quote from the diaries of Watkin Tench. |
| 1999 | Mural by Wendy Sharpe, commissioned for the Cook & Phillip Park Centre, Sydney | Annette Kellerman Mural | Wendy Sharpe | Cook and Phillip Park Aquatic and Fitness Centre; 33.873355°S 151.213091°E | Eight large acrylic paintings on vinyl ester panels depicting career highlights of "Australian mermaid" Annette Kellermann. |
| 1999 | Sculpture in Haymarket, Sydney | Golden Water Mouth (Wikidata) | Lin Li | Chinatown, Corner of Hay and Sussex Streets; 33.879444°S 151.204936°E | A trunk of a yellow box eucalyptus, partially covered in gold leaf with water dripping from one of the upper branches. Installed at the entrance to Chinatown to "encourage harmony and serenity" and incorporating "the five natural elements – of wood, water, earth, fire and gold to harmonise the natural environment with the urban environment". The tree itself came from Condobolin – where early Chinese migrants to Australia came to the goldfields. |
| 2000 | "Passage" – Fountain in Martin Place, Sydney | Passage | Anne Graham | Martin Place; 33.867877°S 151.211977°E | Three bronze fountains in the shape of large overflowing bowls, representing Georgian washrooms, in a house that is recalled by a floor plan inlaid on the pavement. Periodically a mist rises from vents along the inlay, evoking the house's walls. A site-specific work designed for the 2000 Olympics and also the 2001 Centenary of Federation. |
| 2000 | Marble sculpture in Aurora Place, Sydney by Kan Yasuda | Touchstone | Kan Yasuda | Aurora Place; 33.865200°S 151.212051°E | Two pieces of marble creating a typical work described as of "extremely meditative tranquility". |
| 2000 | Kinetic sculpture by Prentice installed in the foyer of Aurora Place, Sydney | Three Wheeler | Tim Prentice | Aurora Place; 33.864983°S 151.211889°E | Kinetic air-wheel sculpture, described as "the perfect spatial counterpart" to the foyer space which is clad in terracotta tiles made by NBK Baukeramik of Germany to "anchor the building to the earth" and granite. |
| 2000 | Commissioned painting by Fonseca in the foyer of Aurora Place | Fifth Street #14 | Caio Fonseca | Aurora Place; 33.864983°S 151.211889°E | Painting commissioned for the foyer of the building and positioned against the distinctive terracotta ceramic tiles, similarly to the Prentice sculpture in the same space. Abstract composition. |
| 2000 | Sculpture by Kimio Tsuchiya in the Tarpeian Way, Sydney | Memory is Creation without End | Kimio Tsuchiya | Tarpeian Way; 33.861304°S 151.213683°E | Sandstone blocks from demolished buildings embedded into the earth in a spiral. |
| 2000 | Sculpture by Fiona Hall in Royal Botanic Garden, Sydney (2000) | Folly for Mrs Macquarie | Fiona Hall | Royal Botanic Garden; 33.859648°S 151.216561°E | The idea came from a suggestion in a sketch book from the colony's early history that a folly was built for the Governor Macquarie's wife and contains various references including a component of the Macquarie coat of arms at the apex. It is sited across Farm Cove looking towards Mrs Macquarie's Chair. |
| 2000 | Sculpture by Batros (2000) | Gilgamesh (Wikidata) | Lewis Batros | University of Sydney; 33.887237°S 151.186146°E | Located between the old Teachers college and the Women's Sports Centre at the university, the statue of Gilgamesh was commissioned by the Assyrian community. |
| 2000 | Sculpture in Barrack Street, Sydney offered at the time of the Sydney Olympic Games in 2000 | Athena | | Barrack Street; 33.867675°S 151.206414°E | Statue of Athena offered to the City of Sydney and unveiled during his visit to the city for the 2000 Olympic Games, by the Mayor of Athens, Mr Demetres Avramopoulos. |
| 2000 | One of a series commemorating the contribution of the Spanish and Portuguese | Simón Bolívar | | Ibero-American Plaza, Surry Hills; 33.884978°S 151.207008°E | Simón Bolívar is one of series of portrait sculptures set in the Ibero-American Plaza to commemorate the contribution of the Spanish and Portuguese in Australia. Others in the series are Pedro Fernández de Queirós, Henry the Navigator, José Gervasio Artegas, Eugenio de Santa Cruz y Espejo, Antonio Narino, Juana Azurduy de Padilla, Don Bernardo O'Higgins R., José Rizal, Miguel Grau Seminario, José Martí, Benito Juárez. |
| 2000 | Sculpture by Brenda L Croft set into pavement in Royal Botanic Garden, Sydney | Wuganmagulya (Farm Cove) | Brenda L. Croft | Royal Botanic Garden 33.863291°S 151.219000°E | Insets into the pathway in terrazzo and stained concrete depicting figures from Sydney Aboriginal rock carvings. |
| | Sculpture by Brenda L. Croft set into pavement in Royal Botanic Garden, Sydney | Naissance | Arthur Sherman | Courtyard of19 Oxford Street, Darlinghurst 33.8775453°S 151.2122605°E | Bronze |

=== Twenty-first century ===
The 20th century sculptor Tom Bass described himself as "a maker of totems – symbolic, widely recognisable forms that embody social, cultural and spiritual meanings for a community – for a city, a corporate client or humanity in general", however, noted Sydney art critic John McDonald critic has commented that "only nowadays our malaise is cultural illiteracy." In the twenty-first century, citizens and viewers of public art no longer share a common theology and world-view nor a "general grasp of symbolism and numerology". The absence of such a "shared cultural lexicon" means that sculptors have had to master more than form, medium, composition and technique to create meaning with their works.

| Year | Image | Title | Artist/s | Location | Notes and references |
|---|---|---|---|---|---|
| 2001 | Plowright "Helix" | Helix | Terrance Plowright | Central Station | Fountain sculpture in stainless steel, 11 metres high |
| 2001 | | Sydney Gay and Lesbian Holocaust Memorial (Wikidata) | Russell Rodrigo & Jennifer Gamble | Green Park 33.8794°S 151.22°E | A memorial to the persecution of homosexuals in Nazi Germany in the form of a pink triangle with black poles. Located in Darlinghurst - a centre of Sydney's gay and lesbian population - and adjacent to the Sydney Jewish Museum. |
| 2002 | | Rhythms of Life | Andrew Rogers | Liverpool Street33.8765186°S 151.2067517°E | |
| 2003 | Sculpture in vestibule of the Mitchell Library, Sydney | Southern Cross | Jon Hawley | State Library of New South Wales; 33.866210°S 151.213284°E | Sculpture representing the Southern Cross and mounted in the vestibule of the Mitchell wing of the Library. Made from "cobalt blue glass, stainless steel, clear perspex and fibre optic lights" and is "inspired by one of the earliest known images [of the constellation]" in the Florentian manuscript Lettera di Andrea Corsali (1516). |
| 2003 | Kinetic sculpture by James Angus (2003) for the Sydney Theatre Company | Wave Machine | James Angus | Roslyn Packer Theatre, Sydney Theatre Company, Walsh Bay 33.857160°S 151.204919°E | Wall mounted kinetic work using acrylic paint, fibreglass, steel and electric motors. |
| 2004 | Durham "Still Life with Stone and Car" (2004) | Still Life with Stone and Car (Wikidata) | Jimmie Durham | Centre of the roundabout where Pottinger Road meets Hickson Road at Pier 2/3 Walsh Bay; 33.855680°S 151.207208°E | A boulder from the New South Wales Central Coast with a painted face, resting where it had been ceremoniously dropped as part of the 2004 Sydney Biennale – on a 1999 Ford Festiva parked on the Sydney Opera House forecourt. Now permanently installed on a roundabout near the Harbour Bridge. It is a work that is "both a performance and an installation", and is "concerned with monuments and monumentality, but also with nature". |
| 2004 | Tipping "Artwork Ahead" (2004) Tipping "End Artwork" (2004) | Artwork | Richard Tipping | Either side of roundabout where Hickson Road meets Pottinger Street at Walsh Bay; 33.855611°S 151.207327°E | Two bright yellow signs, in the style and material of a roadworks warning sign, "acting as book ends" to the roundabout featuring Still Life with Stone and Car (2004). Both read "Artwork Ahead" on one side and "End Artwork" on the other. The sculptor has said: "Words are sonic magic ... I want to give sculptural weight to language." |
| 2004 | Memorial sculpture in Sydney dedicated to people who lost their lives at work | Memory Lines | Ingrid Skirka | Darling Harbour | A memorial to working people "whose lives have been cut short in the pursuit of earning a living". The work was unveiled on the Workers International Day of Mourning. A plaque in the ground nearby reads "A place to reflect upon dignity and respect of others at work" |
| 2005 | Sculpture by Oliver installed in the Sydney Hilton Hotel | Vine | Bronwyn Oliver | Sydney Hilton Hotel 33.871839°S 151.207082°E | A 16.5m column or "tendril" of welded aluminium strands, suspended from the ceiling in the hotel's foyer. The artist said it was "intended to be like a vine or a tendril, reaching up to light", and "echo the meandering path of guests as they moved up" the hotel's tiers. |
| 2005 | Portrait bust of Hans Christian Andersen, unveiled by the Crown Prince and Princess of Denmark | Hans Christian Andersen | Herman Wilhelm Bissen | Observatory Hill Park, Millers Point; 33.859364°S 151.204942°E | A replica of the sculpture done by Bissen in 1865. Commissioned by the Australian Danish community, presented to the City of Sydney for the bicentennial celebrations of Andersen's birth, unveiled by Frederik and Mary, Crown Prince and Princess of Denmark. |
| 2007 | Owen "New Constellation" | New Constellation | Robert Owen | MLC Centre; 33.868243°S 151.209563°E | Painted steel wall-mounted work, dedicated to Harry Seidler. |
| 2007 | Painting by Robert Owen in MLC building, Sydney | Interlude – Double Weave | Robert Owen | MLC Centre; 33.868243°S 151.209563°E | Painting on wood panels dedicated to Harry Seidler. |
| 2008 | Statue of Pope John Paul the Great by Fiorenzo Bacci of outside St Mary's Cathedral, Sydney | Pope John Paul the Great | Fiorenzo Bacci | St Mary's Cathedral; 33.871351°S 151.213145°E | Donated by the Italian-Australian community of Sydney. |
| 2009 | Wall-mounted aluminium sculpture by Alexander Knox | Morpho | Alexander Knox | 420 George Street 33.869656°S 151.207044°E | The title comes from the name of a large tropical butterfly with iridescent wings. Aluminium scales are attached to wall-mounted panels and reflected light animates the surface. |
| 2009 | Bright yellow steel sculpture at Darling Harbour, Sydney | Jay Flowers | Robert Parr | Darling Harbour; 33.873957°S 151.201635°E | Jay Flowers was commissioned by the Darling Harbour Authority in 1988, and was one of several works of public art for Darling Harbour selected by a special advisory committee under the chairmanship of Neville Wran. The sculpture was designed by Robert Parr, a teacher of sculpture at the Canberra School of Art, and executed in cut and welded steel by K and G Fabrications of Unanderra. The five outsize blooms mounted on stems made from gently out-curving Rolled Steel Joists represent a bunch of Australian flannel flowers. |
| 2009 | | Korean War Memorial (Wikidata) | Jane Cavanough | Moore Park 33.886844°S 151.218485°E | The first official Korean War memorial in NSW, featuring 136 steel and bronze hibiscus flowers (representing the number of Australian soldiers killed), and a mound of 11 stones (representing the battles in which Australian soldiers received honours) surrounded by a stone circle inspired by the form of a taegeuk. |
| 2010 | St Mary of the Cross | St Mary of the Cross | Louis Laumen | St Mary's Cathedral; 33.871039°S 151.213151°E | Larger than life bronze of Mary MacKillop commissioned as a permanent tribute to Australia's first saint. |
| 2010 | Aspire by Warren Langley | Aspire | Warren Langley | Underneath the Western Distributor, Ultimo; 33.875251°S 151.196926°E | In the form of trees, the sculpture is made of high density polyethylene and references community action to preserve local housing. |
| 2010 | Sculpture by Linda Bowden at Walsh Bay, Sydney | Into the Trees II | Linda Bowden | Walsh Bay; 33.856600°S 151.203904°E | A cluster of seven chunky four-sided metal shapes up to 3.5m high. Exhibited in Sculpture by the Sea 2010. |
| 2010 | Tree carving in Royal Botanic Garden | YuraBirong | Vic Simms | Royal Botanic Garden; 33.864665°S 151.218964°E | The stump of an old gum tree (Eucalyptus tereticornis) carved in the traditional aboriginal manner. The different patterns on the tree represent different tribal groups across New South Wales. "YuraBirong" means "people of this place". |
| 2011 | Kinetic sculpture, Scout Place, Sydney | Windlines, the Scout Compass of Discovery | Jennifer Turpin, Michaelie Crawford | Scout Place, Alfred Street 33.861807°S 151.211660°E | Kinetic sculpture commemorating the 2008 centenary of Scouting in Australia. Funded by Dick and Pip Smith. |
| 2011 | Sculpture by Angus installed at 1 Bligh St, Sydney | Day In, Day Out | James Angus | 1 Bligh Street; 33.864549°S 151.210604°E | Brightly coloured ellipsoidal surfaces drawn from the shapes of the building. A private commission, chosen by the building's owners and architects. |
| 2011 | Sculpture by Paul Selwood in The Domain, Sydney | Paradiegma Metaphysic | Paul Selwood | Royal Botanic Garden; 33.864575°S 151.220247°E | Flat sheets of metal painted pale green. Winner of the Balnaves Foundation Sculpture Prize in 2011. |
| 2011 | Part of sculpture in the Royal Botanic Garden, Sydney | Wurrungwuri | Chris Booth | Farm Cove; 33.861024°S 151.216050°E | The sculpture consists of two parts – a wave and a monolith. The former is constructed from 260 blocks of Sydney sandstone with a combined weight of 350 tonnes. The latter consists of "16,000 threaded quartz pebbles" and decorated with a pattern from the Sydney Shield, an aboriginal object in the collection of the Australian Museum and made during the period of earliest European settlement. |
| 2011 | | Calais Deviation | Sarah Robson | College Street33.8753739°S 151.2124936°E | Coated Aluminium, Cast Bronze and Patina |
| 2012 | Sculpture by Dave Towey, Richard Major, Michael Thomas Hill, Richard Wong | Forgotten Songs (Wikidata) | Michael Thomas Hill | Angel Place; 33.867263°S 51.207809°E | The sculpture commemorates the songs of fifty birds, such as the Spotted pardalote, once heard in central Sydney. A popular temporary art work that was made permanent. |
| 2012 | Halo | Halo (Wikidata) | Jennifer Turpin & Michaelie Crawford | Chippendale Green, Central Park; 33.885749°S 151.200434°E | Kinetic sculpture whose form references the enormous circular brewing-vat support found in the nearby decommissioned Brewery Yard building. The off-centred encircling motion of the ring is a re-imagining of brewing alchemy and the effects of alcohol. |
| 2012 | Bronze sculpture in Sydney | Youngsters | Caroline Rothwell | Barrack Street; 33.867631°S 151.207078°E | One of two figures in the tradition of monumental bronzes but in the size of a child wearing contemporary street clothes. The other child is doing a handstand. |
| 2012 | Sculpture in The Domain, Sydney | Barrel Roll | Peter Lundberg | Royal Botanic Garden | Work named after the sculptor's experience surfing at Whale Beach and created by concrete cast from a large dug hole. Winner of Sculpture by the Sea in 2012. |
| 2013 | Bronze sculpture in Hyde Park, Sydney | Governor Lachlan Macquarie | Terrance Plowright | Macquarie Street (Hyde Park North) 33.869865°S 151.211878°E | Commemorative sculpture of Governor Lachlan Macquarie, "The Father of Australia", commissioned by the NSW Government and unveiled by Governor Marie Bashir. |
| 2014 | Conceptual art work with scrolling electronic display | I STAY (Ngaya ngalawa) | Jenny Holzer | 8 Chifley Square 33.866445°S 151.210899°E | A conceptual artwork using scrolling digital sign of light-emitting diodes in blue, green and red. Attached to a four-sided, 19-metre long, and diagonal steel column of the building's ground floor it features a series of "...songs, poems, stories and other texts by Aboriginal Australians and Torres Straight Islanders [sic]". |
| | Bandicoots in bronze | Bandicoots | Ochre Lawson | Waratah Mills light rail stop – Davis St entrance | A bronze work celebrating the reappearance of endangered long-nosed bandicoots in the Inner West |
| | | The Distance of Your Heart | Tracey Emin | Between Macquarie Place Park and Bridge Street | A series of 60 handcrafted bronze birds expressing the loneliness resulting from Australia's being so distant from the rest of the world. One bird is situated near the Obelisk of Distances, designed by Francis Greenway. |
| 2015 | 'Yininmadyemi' – Thou didst let fall | Yininmadyemi – Thou didst let fall (Wikidata) | Tony Albert | Hyde Park 33.875195°S 151.209777°E | A combination memorial and public art work "acknowledging Aboriginal and Torres Strait Islander men and women who served in the nation's military". |
| 2016 | Village Voices | Village Voices | Astra Howard | Wilshire Street to Crown Street pedestrian link, Surry Hills | A message board which displays text developed through community workshops and from individuals' submissions. Its content is regularly updated. |
| 2017 | Interloop | Interloop (Wikidata) | Chris Fox | Wynyard station | As part of the renovation of the escalators in Wynyard railway station, 244 of the wooden treads and 4 "combs" from the original installed in 1931, were repurposed and installed in a twisting sculpture on the ceiling above the new escalator. Winner of the judges choice at the 2018 National Trust Heritage Awards. |
| 2017 | "Reflection" (2017) | Reflection | Jess Dare & Richard Johnson | Martin Place 33.86759°S 151.20955°E | A memorial to the 2014 Sydney hostage crisis, the work consists of 210 handmade glass flowers, embedded into the pavement near the site of the event. |
| 2020 | | Secret World of Starlight Ember | Lindy Lee | East side of Museum of Contemporary Art Australia 33.8596016°S 151.2094858°E | The Kerridge Foundation in memory of Maureen Anne Kerridge AM |
| 2020 | | Open Space! | Emily Floyd | Junction of George Street and Curtin Place 33.865153°S 151.2074147°E | |
| 2021 | "Nurses Walk" (2021) | Nurses Walk | Rochelle Haley | The Rocks 33.860214°S 151.208419°E | An installation on the site of a former hospital. |
| Proposed ("benched indefinitely") | | Cloud Arch (Wikidata) | Jun'ya Ishigami | George Street | Proposed work in white stainless steel intended to evoke the image of a cloud, "like thrown ribbon in the sky". |

== See also ==
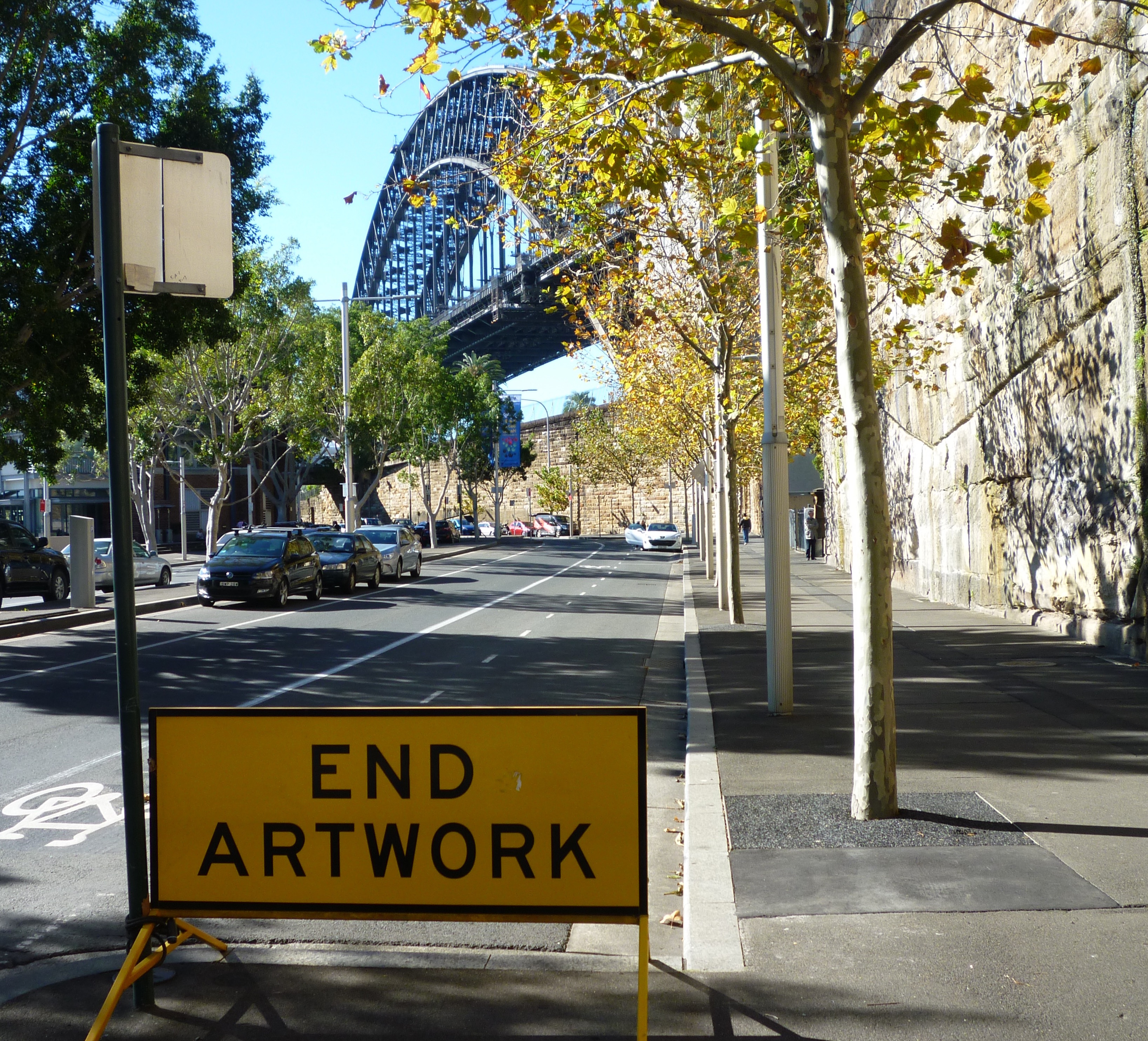
Street view of Tipping's "End Artwork" (2004)

- Sculpture by the Sea
- List of public art in Brisbane
- List of public art in the City of Westminster
- List of public art in the City of London
