= Bronwyn Oliver =

Australian sculptor (1959–2006)

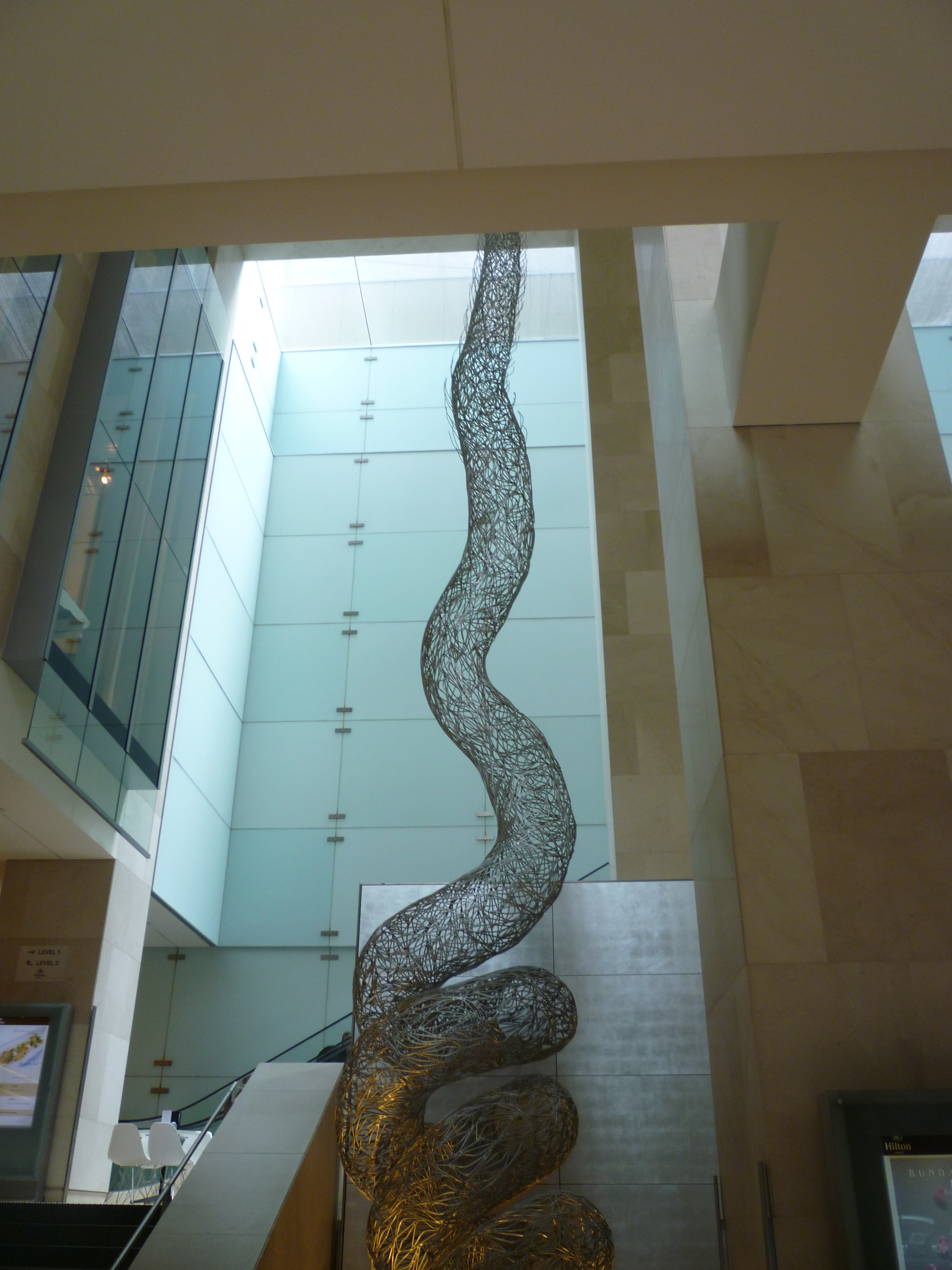
- "Vine" sculpture by Bronwyn Oliver
- Born: Bronwyn Joy Gooda; 22 February 1959; Gum Flat, New South Wales, Australia
- Died: 10 July 2006 (aged 47); Haberfield, New South Wales, Australia
- Education: College of Fine Arts (COFA), Australia; Chelsea School of Art, England
- Known for: Sculpture
- Notable work: Big Feathers (1999); Palm (1999); Globe (2002); Vine (2005)

Bronwyn Joy Oliver (née Gooda, 22 February 1959 – 10 July 2006) was an Australian sculptor whose work primarily consisted of metalwork. Her sculptures are admired for their tactile nature, aesthetics, and technical skills demonstrated in their production.

Oliver was raised in rural New South Wales, Australia. She trained at Sydney's Alexander Mackie College of Advanced Education and London's Chelsea School of Art. She achieved early success, winning both a New South Wales Travelling Art Scholarship in 1981 and the Moet & Chandon Australian Art Fellowship in 1994. She in Sydney, where she both practiced her metalworking art and taught, until her death in 2006.

In her later career, most of her pieces were both public and private commissions. Her major works include Vine, a 16.5-metre-high sculpture in the Sydney Hilton, Magnolia and Palm, in the Sydney Botanical Gardens, and Big Feathers in Brisbane's Queen Street Mall.

Recognition of her work included selection as a finalist in the inaugural Helen Lempriere National Sculpture Award in 2000, inclusion in the National Gallery of Australia's 2002 National Sculpture Prize exhibition, and being shortlisted for the 2006 Clemenger Contemporary Art Award. Her works are held in major Australian collections, including the National Gallery of Australia, the National Gallery of Victoria and the Art Gallery of New South Wales.

== Early life ==
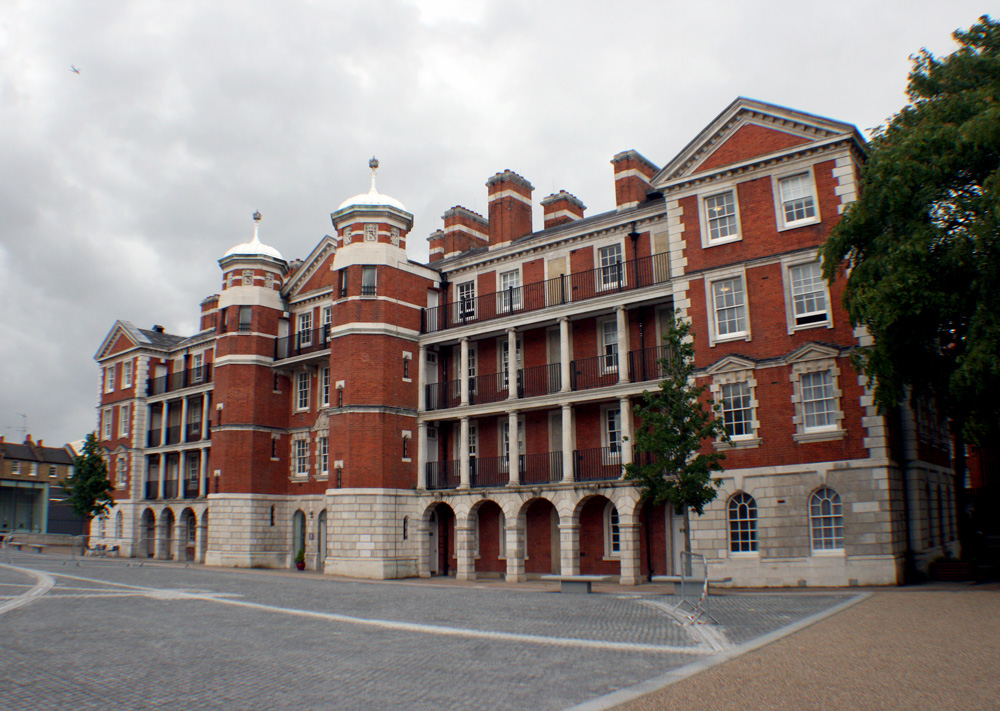
The Chelsea School of Art, where Oliver completed her Masters

Bronwyn Oliver (born Bronwyn Gooda) was born on 22 February 1959, in Gum Flat, west of Inverell, in New South Wales, Australia. Her parents were Milton (a farmer turned greenkeeper) and Wendy (who worked in a pharmacy). Oliver’s creativity was nurtured from a young age; when she was just eight, she attended weekend art classes in Inverell run by Ian Howard, who went on to become dean of the college in Sydney where Oliver would later study.

As she was dux of her school, her parents expected her to go on to university. However, Oliver wished to pursue a creative career. When she told her parents of her plans, her mother replied, "Darling, your father and I are very pleased you're going to art school, but if you'd been a son, I think we'd be a little disappointed." A rift subsequently developed between her and her family that resulted in her having no contact with them for 25 years.

After leaving school, she studied and worked in Sydney. She had intended to enroll in painting classes, but a computer error placed her in the sculpture course: she later said "I knew straight away I was in the right place".

She graduated from the Alexander Mackie College of Advanced Education in 1980. Winning a New South Wales Travelling Art Scholarship in 1983, she then completed a master's degree at Chelsea School of Art in 1984. Her work was influenced by Richard Deacon, Antony Gormley and Martin Puryear under whom she studied while in England.

Upon returning from the United Kingdom, she immediately met with further success, when in 1994 she won a Moet & Chandon Australian Art Fellowship. In 1988 she was granted a period as artist-in-residence in the city of Brest on the coast of Brittany, where she studied Celtic metalworking techniques. In 1989 she was awarded a Marten Bequest Travelling Scholarship.

== Personal life ==
In her early twenties, Bronwyn Gooda married Leslie Oliver, taking his surname and later retaining it "despite a distressing divorce". The artist lived in the inner-western Sydney suburb of Haberfield, where she also had her studio. For 19 years up until her death, she taught art to pre-school age children at Sydney's Cranbrook School in Bellevue Hill. She was a friend of Roslyn Oxley, at whose eponymous gallery Oliver exhibited her works. For the last 22 years of her life, her partner was wine writer Huon Hooke.

== Works and exhibitions ==
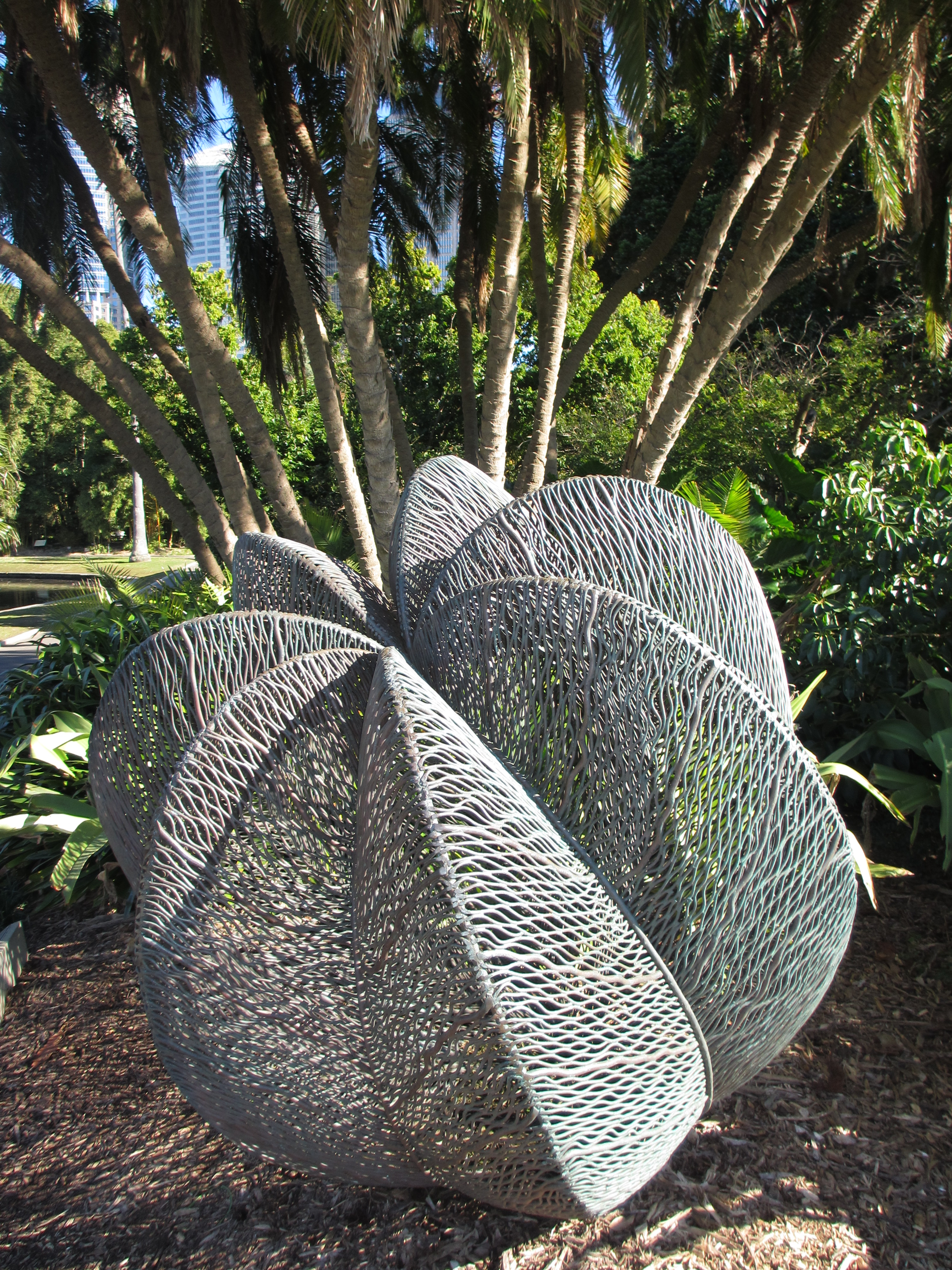
Palm (1999), Royal Botanic Garden, Sydney

Biographer Hannah Fink estimated that Oliver produced 290 works over a career of 22 years. Of these, public art works are Oliver's best known sculptures. These include Eyrie, created for Adelaide's Hyatt Hotel in 1993, and Magnolia and Palm, commissioned in 1999 by the Sydney Botanical Gardens, as part of the Sydney Sculpture Walk. That same year, Big Feathers was commissioned for the Queen Street Mall in Brisbane. It comprises two large feather-shaped forms suspended above the pedestrian precinct, representing "Queen Street's history of parades as well as the mall's connection between earth and sky".

In 2000, Oliver's piece Entwine was a finalist in the inaugural Helen Lempriere National Sculpture Award, while in the following year, Oliver won the University of New South Wales inaugural sculpture commission competition, with her three-metre-high Globe. Other success followed, when Trace was selected for the National Gallery of Australia's 2002 National Sculpture Prize exhibition.

In August 2002 she was one of five artists shortlisted by the Australian Government for a project to produce a public artwork celebrating the centenary of women's suffrage in Australia. (Note: The winning design was by Jennifer Turpin and Michaelie Crawford, but the sculpture was never installed.)

By the 2000s most of Oliver's output constituted commissioned pieces, whether public or private. The most substantial of these is Vine, a 16.5 metre high sculpture installed as part of the $400 million refurbishment of the Sydney Hilton. Taking twelve months to create and requiring a budget of up to half million dollars, (Note: There are two published estimates of the value of the work's contract. Catherine Keenan reported about $350,000, while Sunanda Creagh reported about $500,000.) the work was completed in 2005. The sculpture was fabricated from 380 kilograms of aluminium, and assembled by a team of eight Croatian welders.

By 2006, Oliver had held 18 solo exhibitions of her work, half of them at Roslyn Oxley9 Gallery, which represented her throughout her career as a sculptor. Only one of those solo exhibitions was held outside Australia: a 1992 exhibition at Auckland City Art Gallery following a residency. However, Oliver was represented in numerous international group shows, including five during the period 1983 to 1984, around the time she completed her master's degree in London. Four of the group shows at that time were in the United Kingdom; the fifth was at the Museum of Traditional Industries in Kyoto. Subsequent international group shows included 'Five Australian Artists' at Brest's Centre Culturale in 1988, the year she undertook an artist's residency in that city. Later group shows of which Oliver was part included 'Prospect '93' at the Frankfurter Kunstverein, 'Systems End: Contemporary Art in Australia', which exhibited in several east Asian galleries in 1996, and the Beijing International Biennale in 2003.

== Technique ==
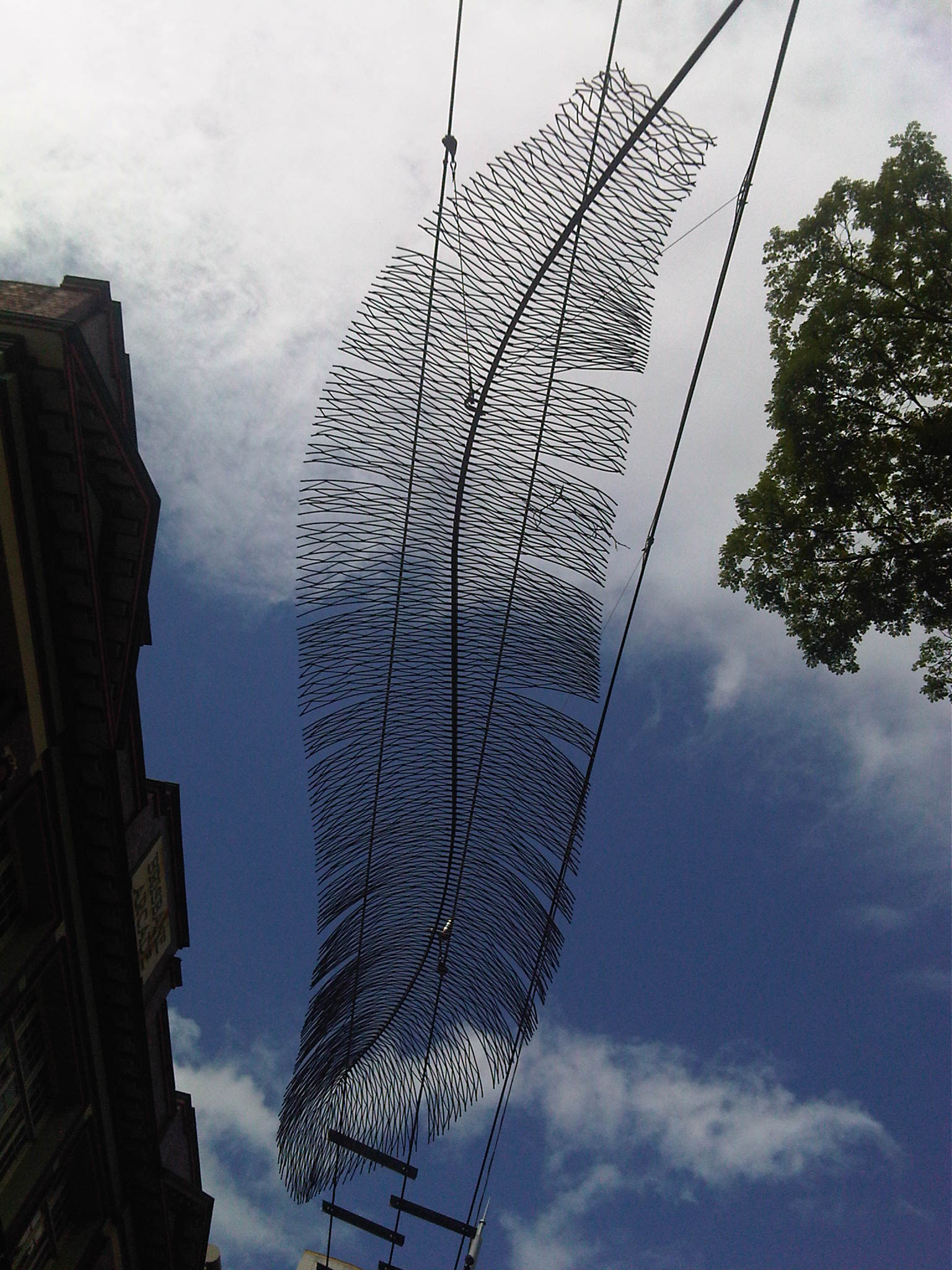
Oliver's Big Feathers (1999) in Queen Street Mall, Brisbane

A sculptor for her entire artistic career, Oliver used paper, cane or fibreglass for her early works. However, she found "fibreglass hazardous and paper too impermanent", and for most of her career she worked in metal. The metals used for her creations varied: the monumental Vine was fabricated in aluminium, as was the Brisbane sculpture Big Feathers; however most, such as Palm and the 2002 sculpture Lock, were crafted in copper. All 25 works included in the 1995 publication, Bronwyn Oliver: mnemonic chords, were made in copper, though a handful also utilised other materials such as bronze, lead or, in one case, fibreglass.

Oliver was always preoccupied with "what materials will do". Fink observed that "[f]rom the beginning, Oliver has been interested in things that are made from the inside out, and her works often give cryptic evidence of their manufacture". That evidence of manufacture was not confined to the works themselves: friends and art critics observed the injuries and marks she carried as a result of working with such unforgiving material.

Ideas were often first sketched by Oliver, before she moved to construction in three dimensions. When preparing commissions, she would draw on the ideas of clients or the nature of the site. For large works she created maquettes (or models), sometimes in plasticine, on other occasions using copper wire or, in the case of her 2002 sculpture Globe, wood and metal. Oliver would produce the more delicate works herself. Many were created by crafting and joining wire to create abstract forms. These were built around moulds, twisting the metal into place with pliers, before severing it with wirecutters. Joins were soldered or brazed (though in some pieces, the wire was woven). In Web (2002), copper pieces were sewn together using wire. Her partner Huon Hooke described her at work in the studio:

She is sitting cross-legged on the floor, on a piece of foam rubber. Her work is on a low bench constructed of timber covered with fireproof bricks...The tiny jeweller's blowtorch is in her right hand, the big bottles of oxygen and acetylene standing behind her. In her left is the brazing rod and she's making one of the thousands of joints that make up a new sculpture, the fire licking at the fireproof cement covering the polystyrene mould as well as curling around the tiny piece of cooper wire which is being joined.

Major pieces were created at Crawfords Casting foundry in Enfield in Sydney's inner western suburbs. Although the foundry would fabricate the elements of the sculptures, Oliver would still undertake the initial stages, training foundry staff and supervising their activity. Some of the pieces assembled to create the sculptures were made using copper rod, while others were formed using the lost-wax casting technique. Individual pieces would take up to two months to complete.

== Themes and critical reception ==
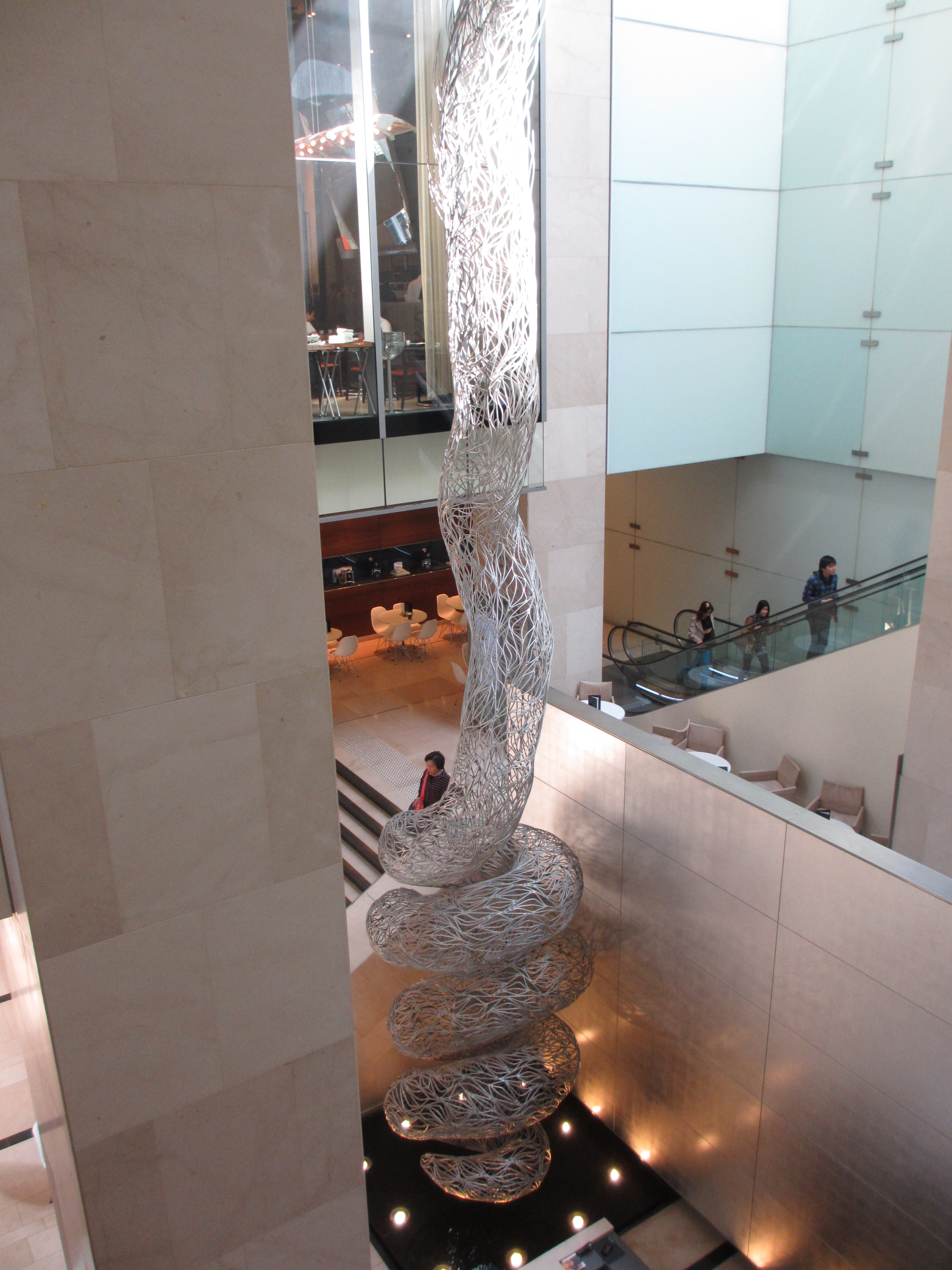
Vine (2005), in the Sydney Hilton Hotel

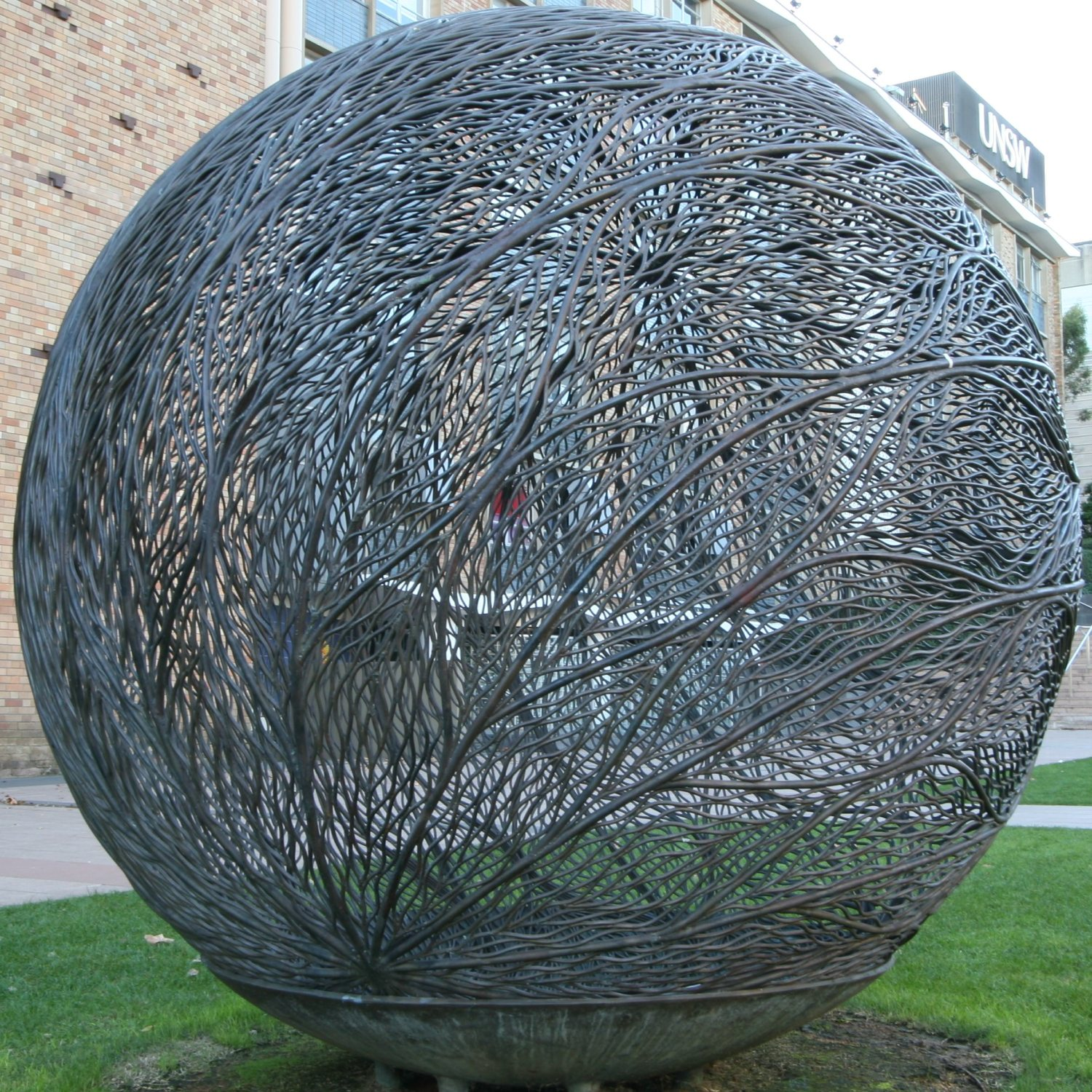
Globe (2002) at the University of New South Wales

Oliver was not one to intellectualise her creativity: she preferred to talk about the process of creating her artworks rather than their meanings. Asked about how she approached her art, she stated:

My work is about structure and order. It is a pursuit of a kind of logic: a formal, sculptural logic and poetic logic. It is a conceptual and physical process of building and taking away at the same time. I set out to strip the ideas and associations down to (physically and metaphorically) just the bones, exposing the life still held inside.

While Oliver was reluctant to discuss meaning in her works, critics have identified recurring themes. Hannah Fink, like art critic John McDonald, noted that there is a pattern to the shapes and structures in Oliver's work. Fink described this as "a consistent vocabulary of elemental forms – the spiral, meander, loop and sphere – in a repertoire of signature archetypes". McDonald said that Nature is "omnipresent" and referred to them as organisms or their remains.

Despite their organic appearance, Oliver's own view was that her work was not grounded in nature's structures. Nevertheless, critics have identified the lifelike qualities of early pieces that resembled shells, claws or tails, or noted the apparent similarities to biological forms. McDonald commented that "For Oliver to deny nature is akin to Balthus saying there is nothing erotic about his paintings or Rothko claiming his works aren't abstract." Both major reviews of Oliver's work published in her lifetime (Fenner's 1995 essay and Fink's 2002 journal article) draw attention to dualism and contradiction in the sculptures: Fenner describes them as "delicate and ephemeral, [yet] structurally robust and durable"; Fink sees them as "ethereal but solid, fluid yet rigid, open but closed".

Oliver's sculptures are admired for their tactile nature, their aesthetics, and the technical skills demonstrated in their production. Particular works have been singled out for praise. A writer reviewing Vine in the Sydney Hilton admired how it "curls like a fairy tale beanstalk up towards the ceiling as though empowered by the sunlight streaming in from a large open space adjacent". Journalist Catherine Keenan's 2005 description of how the towering sculpture demonstrated both aesthetic and production values are typical of comments about Oliver's work:

It has the delicate, adamantine beauty that characterises many of her pieces, but is also an engineering marvel: 380 kilograms of metal that was delivered on the back of an oversized truck and now hangs from a single specially manufactured rod fixed to the ceiling.

The Sydney Morning Herald's art writer, John McDonald, said of her work "It often seems to me she's only got one tune, but it's a pretty good tune". He later elaborated:

It is a cliche that every artist keeps making the same work, but in Oliver's case, while some forms resemble sea creatures and others the buds of plants, the family ties between even the most diverse pieces are very strong ... nothing was dashed off or thrown together. Every piece feels as if it has been minutely considered, with each strand of copper wire being brazed into exactly the right spot ... All the things that have recently been said about Oliver – that she was beautiful, intelligent, charming – could also be said about the work.

Despite this consistency in her output and the coherent themes of her oeuvre, variety was also present. Critic Bruce James considered her 2002 exhibition, and in particular one small work titled Crackled, to demonstrate a broader artistic range: "Crackled is ... formally surprising, evidence that Oliver is not content to rely on a winning recipe of convolution for her concepts. Whole new areas of physical and artistic exploration lay open before her". Hannah Fink, reflecting on Oliver's last sculptures, wrote:

The mastery of her last works seems to defy imagining – one can only marvel at the ingenuity of their construction and the perfection of their realisation. The utter variety of her posthumous exhibition ... put paid to any suggestion she had reached a natural end to her work: almost every work was different, and full of innovation.

In 2000, Oliver was included by Australian Art Collector in its list of Australia's 50 "most collectable artists". In 2005, her work was identified by auction dealers as amongst those of greatest interest in the resale art market.

== Death and legacy ==
Oliver was sometimes characterised as reclusive in both the artistic and social worlds. Her teacher and long-time associate Professor Ian Howard described her as having "an underlying and at times painful distrust of the relationships that are part of our everyday lives". Close friend and gallerist, Roslyn Oxley, observed that she was "very private. She stopped people entering her world a lot of the time." Oliver's sister, Helen, had described her as a "powerful and fragile person" while biographer Fink observed "[a] deeply asocial person, [who] nonetheless maintained longstanding friendships with a small coterie of people whom she trusted". The final period of Oliver's personal life was the subject of contradictory accounts. Oxley said that Oliver in 2006 experienced the end of a 20-year-long relationship, and obituarist Joyce Morgan, who spoke to Huon Hooke after Oliver's death, described Hooke as Oliver's "former" partner. though others writing shortly after her death did not indicate that the relationship with Hooke had ended, including an obituary by Howard, one written by art critic John McDonald, and tributes by her two biographers, Felicity Fenner and Hannah Fink.

Some years later, author Katrina Strickland interviewed people close to Oliver, and reported they had noticed a gradual deterioration in her personality over a period of years; she became "reclusive, obsessive, anxious" as well as "difficult and impatient, and completely obsessed with her diet." Under the circumstances, Hooke had felt he "just wanted to be somewhere else" and left the relationship in late May 2006. At that point, Strickland recounted, "Oliver fell to pieces".

Her friend Roslyn Oxley subsequently concluded that, at some point, Oliver made plans to die of suicide. Journalist Sunanda Creagh interviewed Oxley, as the gallerist prepared the last exhibition of her friend's work:

Oliver made meticulous arrangements for her final show, says Oxley. "She named everything and she wrote a note saying she wanted the show to go ahead. It was very clear. She finished all the work she said she would finish. She never let anyone down, ever. To be under that tension and obviously to have suicide on your mind, but to complete all the obligations before you did it ..." Oxley's sentence trails off.

Oliver died of suicide on 10 July 2006. McDonald recounts that, some weeks after her death, Hooke indicated in an interview that Oliver was "a very troubled person", but none of the sources offered anything definitive about why she died; McDonald himself concluded "we will never know". In 2013, it was reported that analysis of a sample of Oliver's hair contained a very high level of copper, nearly 8 times normal. The debilitating effects of high copper levels, which are associated with some mental illnesses, may have been exacerbated by an imbalance created by low zinc levels in her diet, which was devoid of red meat.

Just before her death, Oliver had been shortlisted for the 2006 Clemenger Contemporary Art Award. In the year following, Oliver was amongst 60 artists profiled in Sonia Payes' book Untitled.Portraits of Australian Artists, while in 2008 her final works were included in the Adelaide Biennale of Australian Art. The resale art market has returned up to seven-figure sums for her works at auction; in 2007 a record for Oliver's work was set when Skein (2004) went under the hammer for $192,000. By 2010, Sydney Biennale chairman Luca Belgiorno-Nettis was reported to have paid $300,000 for one of Oliver's sculptures, titled Tracery, and in November 2024 her monumental 2000 work Tide fetched $1M at auction, breaking the record for Australian sculpture. In 2011, Sydney's College of Fine Arts announced that its new sculpture studio would be named after Oliver. In late 2017, Hannah Fink's book Bronwyn Oliver: Strange Things was launched by Kip Williams at Carthona.

Works by Oliver are held in most major Australian art collections, including the National Gallery of Australia, the Art Gallery of New South Wales, the National Gallery of Victoria, Queensland Art Gallery, the Art Gallery of South Australia, the Auckland Art Gallery, the Tasmanian Museum and Art Gallery, Wollongong City Gallery, Orange Regional Gallery, and the Australian government's collection Artbank. The first "comprehensive survey of 50 key works, from the mid-1980s to the final solo exhibition in 2006" was held in Tarrawarra Museum of Art in Healesville, Victoria from 19 November 2016 to 5 February 2017.

== See also ==
- List of public art in the City of Sydney
