= Cloud Arch =

Proposed public artwork by Junya Ishigami

Coordinates: 33.872983°S 151.207018°E

Cloud Arch is a proposed public artwork by Junya Ishigami for George Street, Sydney.

The sculpture is proposed to be a ribbon of twisted, white stainless steel, representing the shape of a cloud, originally designed to be 58 metres (190 ft) tall and with a span of 53 metres (174 ft). It is intended to "frame" the Sydney Town Hall, and be visible from all approach directions as part of the pedestrianisation of the street. The arch would span the tram tracks of the light rail line running up George Street. The feet of Cloud Arch will be placed on diagonally opposite corners of one of Sydney's busiest intersections, George and Park Street; the sculpture will stand among the Town Hall, the Queen Victoria Building, and The Galeries Victoria.

Originally it was to be installed in 2019 but due to the increased costs ($22m, over the initial estimate of $9m) and disputes about site access during the construction of the light rail, planning for the project was postponed until 2020. As of 2022, the project is on hold.

== Announcement ==
The sculpture was announced on 29 July 2014 as part of a $9 million package of public artworks for Sydney. Cloud Arch was originally expected to cost $3.5 million. The four other artists shortlisted for the George Street sculpture were New Zealander Bill Culbert, Song Dong of China, Australian Mikala Dwyer, and Ugo Rondinone of Switzerland. Announced at the same time were Pavilion by Hany Armanious, a 13-metre-tall (43 ft) milk crate to be placed in Belmore Park, and The Distance of Your Heart by Tracey Emin, to consist of 60 bronze bird sculptures perched on poles and above doorways in the northern end of the central business district. Development applications for the sculptures were to be lodged by the end of 2015.

== Remodelling ==
In 2017, the design was remodelled as a result of the original being incompatible with requirements of the new light rail infrastructure running beneath it. Trams will pass beneath the arch as part of the new south east light rail network, which links Circular Quay and Central Station through George Street. The sculpture's new design was necessary to compensate for the subterranean changes. It requires more steel, is wider and heavier than the one originally proposed (now at 53 metres wide using 140 tonnes of steel, rather than 28.5 metres wide using 58 tonnes). The increased width and the rise in cost from the initial expectation of A$3.5 million to $11.3 million, explained as due to changes in the price of steel since 2015, were both criticised, although it was pointed out that the city spends two-thirds that amount every year for temporary works for Sydney New Year's Eve. On 29 August 2017, a six to four majority of city councillors voted to approve the sculpture. It was originally expected to be completed by March 2019, to coincide with the original planned opening of the George Street light rail line. However, the project was placed on hold in 2018, with the City of Sydney Council stating that it would be revisited as part of the "Town Hall Square" project, a proposal to demolish a number of nearby buildings to create a large plaza east of Sydney Town Hall.

== Critical response ==
Immediate reactions to the announcement of the sculpture were broadly supportive, with positive responses from professional critics, one of whom wrote: "its dance like thrown ribbon in the sky, will excite Sydney's municipal heart, a lasso to the heavens". Popular reaction was dominated by dismissive similes – comparisons of Cloud Arch to everyday objects, and whimsical nicknames for the work, such as "space noodle". However, as one writer explained: "Good art makes us see something anew. It's not about money, or tourism, or popularity. It's about insight – and if it comes with delight and wit, all the better." During the December 2018 city council debate to defer the project it was described by opposition politicians as a “ridiculous vanity project”, the same week The Sydney Morning Herald ran an editorial strongly defending the project.

== See also ==
- Cloud Gate, a public sculpture in Chicago.
- Gateway Arch, a monumental stainless steel arch in St Louis
- List of public art in the City of Sydney
- Queen Victoria, the nearest existing public sculpture to the proposed Cloud Arch
