= Artbank =

Australian art rental program

Artbank is an Australian art rental program established in 1980 by the Australian Government. The program supports contemporary Australian artists by purchasing their artworks and renting them to public and private sector clients. The initiative was inspired by Canada's Art Bank, and was championed by then federal minister for the arts, Bob Ellicott, who convinced Prime Minister Malcolm Fraser of its value. The collection was initially endowed with 600 artworks from the National Gallery of Australia and has since grown to include over 11,000 works by more than 3,500 culturally diverse Australian artists, spanning various media including painting, sculpture, video, photography, and ceramics.

Artbank operates on self-generated income and has collection stores in Sydney, Melbourne, and Perth, Australia. The program also offers a studio program to artists and designers at its Collingwood location.

== History ==
Artbank was modelled on Canada's Art Bank, after then federal minister for the arts, Bob Ellicott, saw the Ottawa collection in 1979 and convinced Prime Minister Malcolm Fraser of the value of the idea. Fraser was enthusiastic, but treasurer John Howard took a little more convincing, before allotting A$250,000 in seed funding. The collection was founded in 1980 with an endowment of 600 artworks from the National Gallery of Australia.

By 1992 Artbank had become so profitable that its government funding was cut off and it operated on self-generated income. It was nearly shut down in 1997, under the Howard government, but it was saved after much lobbying. At the end of the 2000 Australian financial year, its operating profit was recorded as A$700,000 and its total assets A$13.7 million.

== Function and governance ==
Artbank is part of the Department of Infrastructure, Transport, Regional Development and Communications (until January 2020, Department of Communications and the Arts, and various departments preceding that one).

The Director of Artbank (as of October 2023) is Zoe Rodriguez

Established in 1980 by the Australian Government, Artbank’s two core objectives are to provide direct support to Australian contemporary artists through the acquisition of their work and to promote the value of Australian contemporary art to the broader public.

The Artbank collection was founded with an endowment of 600 artworks from the National Collection (now the National Gallery of Australia) and has since grown to include more than 11,000 works spanning media including painting, sculpture, video and photography. Through leasing works to individuals, companies and governments (at all levels), Artbank lives up to its policy principle of promoting broad access to Australian contemporary art.

== Description ==
As of 2020, it has over 11,000 works by more than 3,500 Australian culturally diverse artists, including paintings, sculpture, video art, photographs, and ceramics. Prominent artists represented in the collection are Jeffrey Smart, Julie Dowling, John Olsen, Bill Henson, Gwyn Hanssen-Pigott, Robert Klippel, Emily Kame Kngwarreye, Bronwyn Oliver, William Robinson, Kitty Kantilla, Rover Thomas, Patricia Piccinini, Tracey Moffatt and Del Kathryn Barton. Because the artworks are chosen on cultural value and not in order to turn a profit, the institution is able to acquire some riskier pieces. As of 2020 it has the fastest growing collection of digital and multimedia art in Australia.

Artbank has collection stores in Sydney, Melbourne (opened 1996 in Armadale; moved to a converted warehouse in Collingwood in 2018) and Perth, Australia. The Collingwood location also offers a studio program to artists and designers, open to applications by residents.

=== Leasing ===
Artbank lends its artworks to corporations, government agencies, and private individuals. Restaurateur Kylie Kwong leased a number of artworks for her restaurant at Carriageworks arts centre in Sydney in 2018. Businesses are able to claim a 100% tax deduction for leasing from the institution. Works are sold from time to time, as part of stocktaking process. The cost of leasing an artwork ranges from A$165 to A$5,500 per year, with lease periods lasting from six months to a year, with the ability to extend indefinitely.
