= Terrance Plowright =

Australian artist

Terrance K. Plowright OAM
- Born: 31 March 1949 (age 77); Paddington, New South Wales
- Occupation: Artist
- Years active: 30 years
- Known for: Sculptor
- Spouse: Shirley Plowright
- Children: Raina, Natasha, Tristan
- Website: plowright.com.au

Terrance Kippax Plowright OAM (born 31 March 1949) is an Australian sculptor, based in the Blue Mountains of New South Wales. His works include contemporary and figurative sculptures. He has designed and created large public sculptural water features and murals, substantial public cenotaphs, commemorative cast bronze sculptures, and a large body of religious and spiritual work that includes stained glass windows, altars, lecterns, baptismal fonts and mosaics.

== Biography and early career ==
Plowright was born in Paddington, New South Wales. In 1966, he worked as a copy boy for The Australian Women's Weekly, then trained and worked as a film editor for the ABC. He studied music privately for a short time at the Sydney Conservatorium of Music, and was the lead singer and rhythm guitarist for a number of bands. He developed a keen interest in science, philosophy and music. In 1975, he founded the Awareness Centre in Sydney, and also spent time in the Findhorn Foundation in Scotland. He conducted workshops around human potential and spiritual awareness. His works, in the past 30 years, have endeavoured to explore these themes and to reveal the connection between all living things.

In 1981, Plowright pursued his emerging interest in fine art and spent nine months in New Zealand, where he furthered a growing interest in stained glass creation. In 1983, he established his first studio at Wahroonga in New South Wales.

In 1985, he created a large stained glass window for a private client. In the same year, he was selected as one of two Australian artists to represent Australian glass artists at the Sydney Craft Expo. His first major piece, also in 1985, a commissioned stained glass window, was a memorial to the Royal New South Wales Regiment for the Garrison Church, in The Rocks, Sydney. In 1988, Plowright created one of the country's then-largest stained glass windows, installed in Galston Uniting Church. Another significant work was an 11 x 3m stained glass window, commissioned by St Bernadette's in Castle Hill, New South Wales. His large stained glass piece The Gathering of the Most Sacred was created for an exhibition for the World Council of Churches in 1990. This piece and Living Waters were also exhibited at the Penrith Regional Gallery and the Lewers Bequest Glass Show in 1991.

In 1990, he completed a granite, aluminium and beveled glass sculpture, Purity of Spirit, for Neeta City in Fairfield, New South Wales (now in a private collection). He was invited by the World Council of Churches to be the sculptor and artist-in-residence at the Australian National University in Canberra, Australian Capital Territory in 1991. His works, created during the two-week conference, were televised to over 120 countries. Also in 1991, Plowright was commissioned by the Penrith Returned and Services League to design and create a bronze sculpture, a tribute to the Australian and New Zealand Army Corps at Gallipoli.

His book, Stained Glass:Inspirations and Designs, was written in 1993, and launched by Hazel Hawke.

== Works ==
- 2020: Plowright is currently working on a life-size Sam Male Project with cast bronze figure and contemporary Corten Steel sculpture to be installed in Broome, Western Australia.
- 2019/2020: Plowright has completed a 3m high, cast bronze sculpture of Tayla Harris - "Not just a kick" - to be installed at Docklands Stadium, Docklands, Melbourne
- 2019: He created a 2.2m high, cast bronze and glass sculpture with sequenced lighting - Eternal Flame - for Bathurst City Council.
- 2013/2014: He has completed a 15m/50foot high contemporary sculpture, a national project celebrating 60,000 years of nationhood. This is to be installed in the River Torrens, near the Adelaide Oval.

== Achievements ==
- 2019: Awarded Order of Australia medal (OAM) for his services to the visual arts.
- 2015: Invited to exhibit at the X Florence Biennale
- 2015: Awarded 4th place for sculpture in 2015 Florence Biennale
- 2015: Invited to exhibit at the New York art gallery, Artifact
- 2014: He was a finalist in the McClelland Sculpture Survey and Award 2014 at the McClelland Sculpture Park and Gallery in Melbourne.
- 2013: Invited to exhibit at the IX Florence Biennale, and received a Medici Medal and Special Mention for artistic and sculptural contribution to sculpture at the Biennale
- 2012: Tubular Resonance. Plowright was a finalist in the McClelland Sculpture Prize in Melbourne for his 5m stainless steel interactive sound sculpture.
- 2012/13: Winner of the City of Frankston People's Choice Award at the McClelland Sculpture Park and Gallery, for Tubular Resonance', which was purchased by McClelland Sculpture Park and Gallery, Melbourne

== Other works ==
Plowright has created many figurative and contemporary works, and water features, from both public and private commissions, including:

- Elvis Presley in 2018: a larger-than-life-size, cast bronze sculpture for Parkes City Council.
- Basil Sellers in 2018: a larger-than-life-size, cast bronze bust, private collection.
- George Jones (Air Marshall Sir George Jones) WW2 and Frank McNamara (Air Vice-Marshall Frank McNamara) VC recipient, WW1 in 2016: larger than life-size busts, Shepparton Council in conjunction with Australian War Memorial.
- St. Thomas Aquinas in 2016: 80m stained glass, Australian Catholic University, St Thomas Aquinas Chapel, Ballarat campus.
- Blaxland, Lawson and Wentworth in 2015: larger-than-life-size cast bronze busts. Gregory Blaxland installed in Blaxland, William Lawson installed in Lawson and William Wentworth installed in Wentworth Falls, all in the Blue Mountains, NSW.
- Robert Mactier, World War I Victoria Cross recipient: in 2013/2014: a 2m high bronze portrait commissioned by the City of Greater Shepparton and the Tatura RSL, Victoria, unveiled on 31 October 2014.
- Lachlan Macquarie in 2013: 3m high cast bronze sculpture for the Government of New South Wales, Hyde Park, Sydney.
- Avian Gesture 3 in 2012: A stainless steel contemporary work exhibited at Sculpture at Scenic World.
- Vietnamese Boat People Memorial in 2011: Bronze sculpture, including four 3/4 life-size figures and boat. Memorial for 500,000 Vietnamese who perished at sea in voyages from Vietnam. Commissioned by the Bankstown City Council.
- Life Teeming-Life Teaming in 2011: A 4m stainless steel sculpture commissioned by the Waverley Council for Bondi Junction,.
- Eternal Flame in 2012: 1.5m stainless steel work incorporating 49 LED lights controlled for sequenced lighting. Penrith Memory Park War Memorial, Penrith, New South Wales.
- Steve Waugh in 2012: 1¼ life size, cast bronze sculpture at Sydney Cricket Ground. Commissioned as part of the Basil Sellers Sports Sculpture Project.
- Tribute to Beethoven's Sixth in 2011: A contemporary work of cast 316 stainless steel exhibited at Darling Park Sculptors Society Exhibition.
- Reg Gasnier and Stan McCabe in 2010: 1¼ life size, cast bronze sculptures at Sydney Football Stadium and Sydney Cricket Ground respectively. Commissioned as part of the Basil Sellers Sports Sculpture Project.
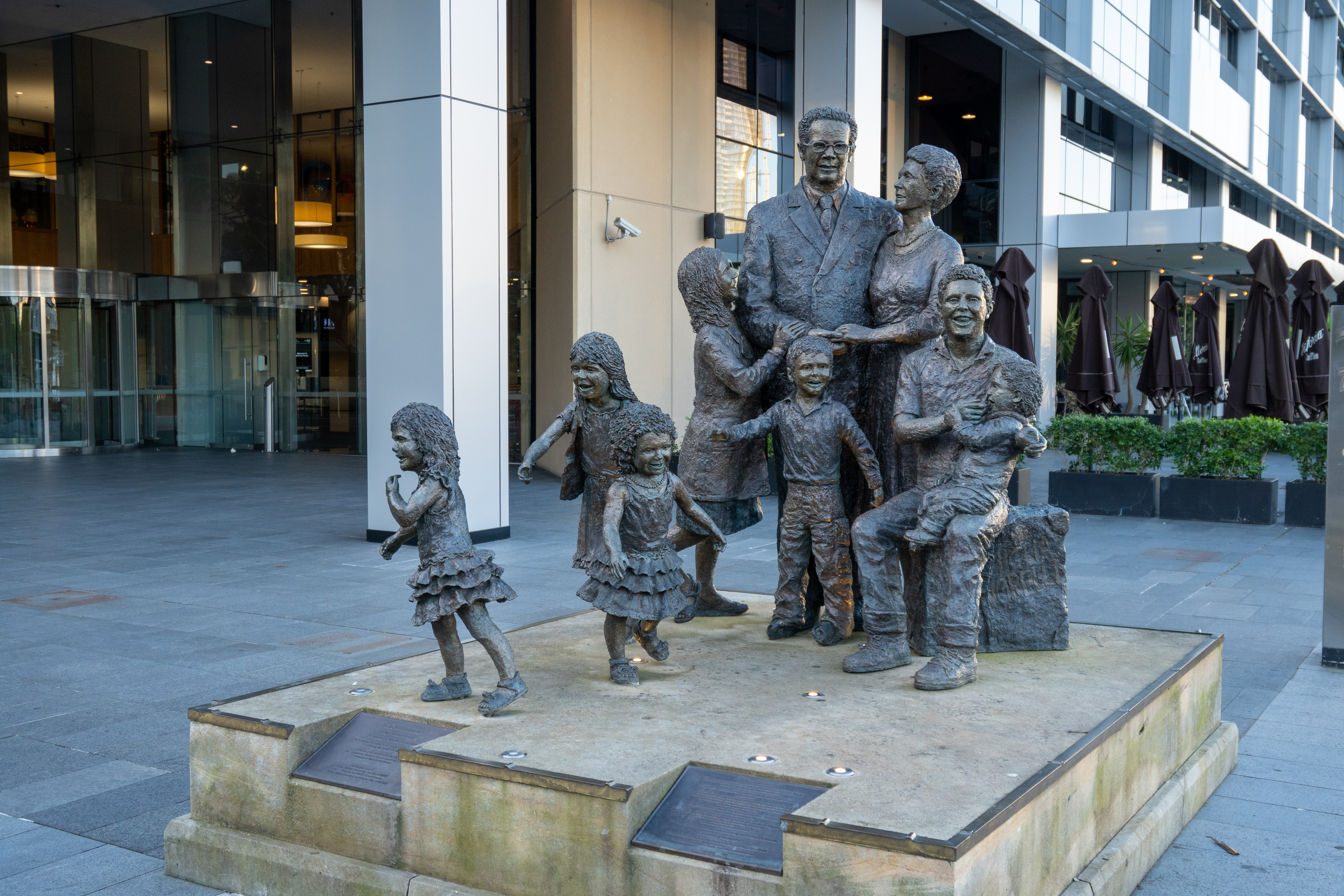
  Life from a Suitcase bronze sculpture
- Life from a Suitcase in 2010: Nine bronze larger than life figures of three generations of the Signorelli family at Pyrmont Bay ferry wharf, Sydney, celebrating early immigration to Australia.
- Awakening Flower of Peace in 2010: A 5m high, stainless steel work in Gough Whitlam Park, Sydney. Commissioned by the City of Canterbury.
- Trevor Allen in 2009: A larger than life size cast bronze sculpture in the Sydney Football Stadium, Commissioned as part of the Basil Sellers Sports Sculpture Project.
- Dance of Intimacy in 2009: A 2.4m high stainless steel work exhibited at the 2009 Darling Park Sculptors Exhibition, page 12.
- Penrith Cenotaph in 2009: 8m long x 3m high, cast bronze, sandstone, stainless steel work with LED lighting in Memory Park, Penrith, New South Wales.
- Sir Henry Parkes in 2008: A larger than life bronze commissioned by the Parkes Shire Council, New South Wales.
- Inseparable in 2009: A contemporary granite work. Received Highly Commended Award at the 2009 Darling Park Sculptors Society Exhibition.
- Richie Benaud in 2008: A larger than life size cast bronze sculpture in the Sydney Cricket Ground. Commissioned as part of the Basil Sellers Sports Sculpture Project.
- Life-saver in 1908: A cast bronze, 3m high sculpture at North Wollongong Beach, commemorating 100 years of life-saving in Wollongong.
- Road builders/convict memorial in 2006: Five larger than life bronze figures, each weighing approximately 2.8 tonnes at Echo Point, Katoomba in the Blue Mountains.
- Emergence in 2006. A 6m high solid granite and stainless steel sculptural water feature/fountain with 3 sets of stainless steel contemporary figures surrounding the main feature. Newcastle Permanent Building, King St, Newcastle, New South Wales.
- Mirrored Stillness, Dancing Streams in 2005: A 50m water feature in Deutsche Bank Place, Phillip Street, Sydney.
- The Surfers in 2004: Three figures in cast bronze, using the Lost-wax casting tradition, Twin Waters, Maroochydore North Shore, Sunshine Coast, Queensland, a Delfin Lend Lease Commission.
- Wings of Spirit in 2004: A contemporary stainless steel sculpture at Twin Waters, Maroochydore, Queensland.
- Three Sisters Dreamtime in 2004: Seven cast bronze Aboriginal figures, all around 2m high. Katoomba Scenic World, Blue Mountains, New South Wales.
- Cobar Miner in 2002: A larger than life bronze sculpture in Cobar, New South Wales; a tribute to 130 miners killed whilst working in the mines.
- Sports Figures in 2001: A series of white sports figures for the Champions sports area in Mount Pritchard, Liverpool, New South Wales.
- Meriton Fountain in 2001: A 5m, cast resin, fibre-glass water feature on the Pacific Highway, Chatswood, New South Wales.
- Exploration of Conscious Space (Harmonic Celebration) in 2010: A 2.3m (with plinth) stainless steel contemporary work exhibited at the Sculptors Society Darling Park exhibition in 2010.
- Aqua-helix in 2001: 11m high stainless steel sculpture at Central railway station, Henry Deane Plaza, Sydney.
- Sydney Olympics sculpture auction piece for the 2000 Summer Olympics: This raised $1.72 million for Australian athletics.
- Pit Pony and Welsh Miner in 2001: Life size cast bronze at Katoomba Scenic World, Blue Mountains, New South Wales.
- Dancing Brolgas in 1998: Featuring twelve 1.6m high cast 316 stainless steel brolgas at Cockle Bay (Sydney), Darling Harbour, was Plowright's first water feature.
- A relief mural at Westfield Parramatta in 1995.
- Hand-painted ceramic figurines of Mary MacKillop for Pope John Paul II's visit to Australia in 1995.
- A 3m cast bronze coat of arms for the Commonwealth Bank in Brisbane in 1995.
- A cast bronze contemporary sculpture for the Qantas air terminal in Adelaide in 1987

== Published works ==
- Stained Glass:Inspirations and Designs Kenthurst, NSW: Kangaroo Press. 1993, reprinted 1995. ISBN 0864174950
