= Jun'ya Ishigami =

Japanese architect (born 1974)

- Born: 1974 (age 51–52); Kanagawa prefecture, Japan
- Education: Tokyo National University of Fine Arts and Music
- Occupation: Architect
- Awards: Architectural Institute of Japan Prize
- Practice: junya.ishigami+associates
- Buildings: Kanagawa Institute of Technology KAIT Workshop

Jun'ya Ishigami (石上 純也, Ishigami Jun'ya) (born 1974 in Kanagawa prefecture) is a Japanese architect.

Ishigami completed his master's degree in architecture and planning at Tokyo National University of Fine Arts and Music in 2000. Between 2000 and 2004, he worked with Kazuyo Sejima at SANAA before establishing his own firm in 2004: junya.ishigami+associates.

In 2008, Ishigami designed the Japanese pavilion at the 11th Venice Architecture Biennale. In 2009, he was the youngest ever recipient of the Architectural Institute of Japan Prize for the Kanagawa Institute of Technology KAIT Workshop in 2009. He won the Golden Lion for Best Project at the 12th Venice Architecture Biennale in 2010, and became an associate professor at Tohoku University in Japan. That same year, his innovative integration of context's complexity to his projects led him to win a Global Award for Sustainable Architecture. In 2014 he was made the Kenzo Tange Design Critic at the Harvard Graduate School of Design in the US. In 2016 he won the international architecture prize Swiss Architectural Award. Now he has got an Atelier at the Accademia di Architettura di Mendrisio. In 2024, he received the Austrian Frederick Kiesler Prize for Architecture and the Arts.

== Works ==
- Table exhibit at the Art Basel exhibition, 2006
- Balloon exhibit at the "Space for your Future" Exhibition, Museum of Contemporary Art, Tokyo, 2007
- Japanese pavilion at the Venice Biennale of Architecture, 2008
- The Yohji Yamamoto fashion store, New York City, 2008
- KAIT Studio for the Kanagawa Institute of Technology in Atsugi, Kanagawa Prefecture, Japan, 2008
- Port of Kinmen Passenger Service Center, Kinmen, Taiwan, 2014
- Cloud Arch, a major proposed sculpture for Sydney, Australia, 2017
- Art Biotop Water Gardens, an outdoor extension to the Art Biotop Nasu resort in Nasu District, Tochigi, Japan, 2019
- Serpentine Galleries Pavilion, 2019
- Zaishu Art Museum, Rizhao, China, 2023
