= Remedial education =

Assistance in order to achieve competencies in core academic skills

Remedial education (also known as developmental education, basic skills education, compensatory education, preparatory education, and academic upgrading) is assigned to assist students in order to achieve expected competencies in core academic skills such as literacy and numeracy.

Whereas special education is designed specifically for students with special needs, remedial education can be designed for any students, with or without disabilities; the defining trait is simply that they have reached a point of lack of preparedness, regardless of why. For example, even people of high intelligence can be under-prepared if their education was disrupted, such as by internal displacement during civil disorder or a war.

== In Australia ==
The development and implementation of the Special Assistance Program in Victorian Primary Schools during the period 1979–1982 constituted the most significant innovation in the provision of special education services to children experiencing learning difficulties and in addressing declining literacy and numeracy standards. Up until the political directive to initiate this program was given, there had been no policy within the Department of Education and Early Childhood Development directing Principals of Primary Schools to develop special programs for pupils at risk of illiteracy and innumeracy.

=== Declining literacy and numeracy skills ===
From the early 1960s, the Education Department of Victoria (Australia), had developed an extensive range of programs in primary schools that sought to develop the individual ability of each pupil. Also, the ratio of pupils to teachers in schools had been significantly reduced over time and schools had become much more independent in the development of school-based remedial programs.

In spite of this, there existed large numbers of children in Victorian primary and secondary schools urgently in need of special assistance in the essential skills of literacy and numeracy. This situation was reflected in the Australian Parliament's House of Representatives Select Committee on Specific Learning Difficulties in 1976. The committee had commissioned research by the Australian Council for Educational Research (ACER) that found that 15% to 20% of children completing their primary education had not achieved a functional level of literacy.

=== Government intervention ===
In late May 1979, within a month of being reelected, the Hamer Liberal Government announced Victoria's first major review of its educational policies for more than 50 years.

Anticipating the new direction, in July 1979, the Assistant Minister of Education, Norman Lacy established a Ministerial Committee on Special Assistance Programs. The committee consisted of people drawn from school staffs, special education facilities, teacher training institutions and the Education Department administration. The committee's report was the basis upon which the Special Assistance Program was established.

The process for the establishment of the Special Assistance Program in Victorian Primary Schools was outlined in a speech Lacy delivered to Special Assistance Resource Teachers (SARTs) at a seminar held at Hawthorn State College (Victoria, Australia) on 15 December 1980. In it he announced the most significant development in remedial education in Victoria with a strategic plan for addressing falling literacy and numeracy standards. The totally new component of the Special Assistance Program was the provision of 1000 SARTs for "the delivery of services to children with special needs." These designated teachers were given "a major on-site school responsibility for facilitating a productive relationship between parents and pupils and teachers." The program involved the training of these primary teachers as SARTs and their placement in schools. Their role was the early detection and remediation of children at risk of illiteracy and innumeracy.

=== Special Assistance Resource Teachers ===
The core element of this change in the delivery of special educational services to children was the role of the school-based Special Assistance Resource Teacher (SART) which was the focus of this world-first breakthrough in class room integration of pupils experiencing learning difficulties. The role incorporated all the elements of the service previously performed by external consultants visiting schools.

As a result, from the beginning of the 1981 school year SARTs were designated by their schools and appointed to the 575 primary schools with enrolments of greater than 300 pupils. They were mandated to establish the Special Assistance Program in their schools. The Education Department's Special Services Division and the Primary Division monitored the progress of the implementation and produced a number of evaluative reports that were presented to the Minister.

From the beginning of the 1982 school year, schools with an enrolment of between 150 and 300 pupils designated and appointed a SART to carry out the role on a half-time basis. This resulted in and additional 302 primary schools in Victoria having a school-based resource teacher, bringing the total to 877 schools. It was not planned to designate a SART at schools with less than 150 pupils. At such schools it was planned that the Principal or an appointed staff member would access services from the Special Assistance Resource Centres for children at these schools in need of such services.

=== In-service training courses for SARTs ===
A major component of stage one was the in-service education component for the SARTs designated by their schools for the new role. A survey of the qualifications and experience of the 575 designated SARTs was undertaken to assess their training requirements. The responses indicated that 200 of the designated teachers had already completed special education training courses. Of these 102 were also experienced in special education teaching. As well 28 of the 375 remaining designated teachers were experienced special education teachers. AREA shared a concern that teachers undertaking SART duties were not qualified in special education, but their proposals to the course committee were rejected.

=== Special Assistance Resource Centres ===
The Report of the Victorian Ministerial Committee on Special Assistance Programs (1980), in one of its major recommendations, identified the need to reorganise and integrate the range of specialist professional services available (external to the school) into a single co-ordinated service. To implement this recommendation, Lacy established a working party within the Victorian Education Department to examine and report on the means to achieve this objective.

Early in 1981, work began on planning for the reorganisation all the relevant special education services provided by the Education Department into a single co-ordinated service delivery system under the Special Assistance Program.

As a result, a reorganised multi-disciplinary service was created on a "one-stop" referral basis through 50 statewide Special Assistance Resource Centres allocated one to each Primary Education Inspectoral District throughout Victoria. The professional disciplines offered at each centre included educational psychology, social work, speech therapy and special education. The availability of these services to primary schools was accessed and co-ordinated by the designated SART within each school and in schools with less than 150 pupils by the principal.

== In Canada ==
In Canada, the process whereby mature students take secondary school courses so that they can qualify to take post-secondary education is called academic upgrading. The Workers' Compensation Board of Nova Scotia defines academic upgrading as "programs offered to adult learners who require the academic pre-requisites needed for entry into many occupational programs." The Alberta Ministry of Enterprise and Advanced Education advises that academic upgrading can be pursued through a post-secondary institution, a school board program such as a storefront school, or via distance learning.

== In the United States ==
In the U.S., postsecondary remediation is delivered on both two-year community college and four-year university campuses. The bulk of remedial courses focus on advancing underprepared students' literacy skills (English basic writing and reading) or math skills. However, remedial courses can also be offered for other subjects such as science or study skills.

=== Student placement ===
Many students are placed into remedial courses through placement tests such as the ACT, SAT, ACCUPLACER, or COMPASS assessments. Often, each college or university sets its own score thresholds for determining whether a student must enroll in remedial courses. However, some states are moving toward a uniform standard for remedial placement cut scores. Students are required to enroll in remedial courses before advancing to a college-level course in that subject. Colleges review a student's score by subject – math, English, science, etc. – and compare that score to the school's cutoff. For example, a college might use a score of 19 on the ACT math section as the threshold for determining whether a student must enroll in a remedial math course or college-level math course.

Particularly at community colleges – which are open enrollment to any student with a high school degree or General Educational Development (GED) certificate – multiple semesters of remedial coursework may be available to and required of students who enter with low placement test scores.

Whether placement tests are the most effective method of placing students is an open debate across the US. Some colleges and states are experimenting with using high school grade point average (GPA) and placement test scores to determine student course referral. A study of placement tests by the Community College Research Center in 2012 found:

Placement test scores are not especially good predictors of course grades in developmental education classes. More importantly, the tests do not have much explanatory power across a range of measures of performance including college GPA, credit accumulation, and success in gatekeeper English and math classes.

— Clive Belfield and Peter M. Crosta

Using GPA with standardized test scores may also improve the accuracy of remedial placement and limit the likelihood of placing students into additional remedial courses they may not need. North Carolina implemented a statewide policy that allows two-year colleges to use both placement test scores and high school GPA to place students.

=== Student enrollment ===
Estimates on the portion of students in higher education taking remedial courses vary. At two-year colleges the percentage reported of students taking at least one remedial course varies from 41% to as high as 60%. Students from low-income households, African American students and Hispanic students are more likely to enroll in remedial courses. National estimates show that among two-year college students, students age 17–19 are most likely to enroll in remedial courses followed by students age 20–24 and then students age 25+.

The likelihood of remedial placement varies among states because of high school preparation, student demographics and state policies for assessing and placing students in remedial courses. Previous proportions of recent high school graduates enrolling in remedial courses at two-year colleges range from over 70% in Tennessee to 31% in North Carolina. The proportion of students enrolling in remedial courses on public, four-year college campuses is generally lower, ranging from 35% in South Dakota to 5% in Washington state.

The state of Colorado issued a 2012 report on remedial placement showing that 40% of recent high school students enrolled in remedial courses at both two-year and four-year colleges. 66% of students enrolled in a two-year college and 24% of students at a four-year institution needed remediation.

Educators and researchers also question whether many of the students directed into remediation ultimately need the course work, and some studies have found that the current method of using placement tests to assign students to remedial courses may be related to overplacement.

=== Course delivery ===
There is an active debate on how remedial courses should be delivered to students. Students who are placed into remedial courses have differing skill levels and needs for support. There is an active debate on whether students that are on the upper end of the skill spectrum may be most successful bypassing remedial coursework and enrolling in college-level courses with additional tutoring. In contrast, students with larger skill deficiencies may require substantial math and English instruction before they can succeed academically. Researchers continue to investigate and make recommendations for effective remedial education models.

Currently, remedial education courses are delivered many ways across the United States:

1. Traditional, semester-long courses;
2. Cohort models that group a class of students together in a series of remedial courses;
3. Placing students in college-level courses with mandated tutoring or supplementary instruction;
4. Modularized courses that target particularly student skills;
5. Intensive, compressed courses that accelerate student readiness;
6. Courses that integrate remedial content with occupational skills;
7. Self-guided computer-based courses that adapt to student skill deficiencies;
8. Online, in computer-based, traditional semester model.

In 2011, a nonprofit did a review of studies on remedial education delivery and found that "programs that show the greatest benefits with relatively rigorous documentation either mainstream developmental students into college-level courses with additional supports, provide modularized or compressed courses to allow remedial students to more quickly complete their developmental work, or offer contextualized remedial education within occupational and vocational programs."

Accelerating the pace at which students progress through remedial courses is a reform now regularly highlighted in academic research and advocacy as effective for increasing student success. Often, remedial courses do not count toward a student's graduation requirements and taking many semesters of remedial education can lengthen a student's path to graduation and take up much needed financial aid. The Community College Research Center has found that accelerating a student's remedial English requirements resulted in a higher likelihood of students completing their remedial sequences, a higher likelihood of enrolling in college-level English courses and a higher likelihood of students receiving a 'C' or better in the college-level course.

Some colleges have explored the possibility of providing remedial education courses online for students; however, evidence indicates that completion of online remedial courses is lower across almost every group of students compared to in-person remedial instruction. There is also evidence that students enrolling in online remedial education are less likely than their in-person counterparts to continue on to college-level coursework in the same subject.

The methods for delivering remedial education and whether to deliver remedial education are active debates in the U.S. As Bahr (Bahr 2008a, pp. 420–421) explains, "On one hand, it fills an important niche in U.S. higher education by providing opportunities to rectify disparities generated in primary education and secondary schooling, to develop the minimum skills deemed necessary for functional participation in the economy and the democracy, and to acquire the prerequisite competencies that are crucial for negotiating college-level coursework. On the other hand, critics argue that taxpayers should not be required to pay twice for the same educational opportunities, that remediation diminishes academic standards and devalues post-secondary credentials, and that the large number of underprepared students entering colleges and universities demoralizes faculty. Following from these critiques, some have argued for a major restructuring of remediation or even the elimination of remedial programs altogether.

=== Research on outcomes ===
Depending on their skill level upon entering college, students can spend one or more semesters working to fulfill remedial requirements before advancing to college-level courses required for their degree. An example of a full sequence of math remedial courses for low-skill students might include: 1) pre-collegiate math, 2) basic algebra, and 3) intermediate algebra. There are many questions about how this structure both benefits students by increasing their preparation and harms students by increasing the courses required and time needed to complete college. Thomas Bailey from the Community College Research Center describes this in a 2010 report:

For example, those with the greatest need for developmental math may be expected to enroll in and pass pre-collegiate math or arithmetic, basic algebra, and intermediate algebra, in order to prepare them for college-level algebra.

Complete College America, a national non-profit working on remedial education reform, reports that among remedial students at two-year colleges 62% complete their remedial course and 23% complete associated college-level courses in that subject within two years (for example, complete math remediation and the college-level math requirements for their degree). On four-year college campuses, 74% of students in remedial courses complete the course, and 37% complete remediation and an associated college-level course in that subject within two years. The same report projects that 9.5% of two-year college students starting in remediation will graduate within three years, and 35.1% of four-year college students starting in remedial courses will graduate within six years.

Similarly, a nationwide study of two year college students participating in remedial education found 46% of students referred to remedial reading and 33% of students in math remediation completed their remedial sequence. A substantial portion of these non-completing students – 29% in math and 16% in reading – did so because they did not pass their remedial course. Another 11% of math students and 9% of reading students exited college without ever having failed or completed a remedial course. Students who enrolled in college and were placed into a sequence of three or more remedial courses were the least likely to persist to a college-level course. Like in all education pathways, there are many different points at which remedial students can step out of education. Research from the Community College Research Center at Columbia University suggests that many students do not complete their remedial sequences or do not enroll in the first college-level course in that subject.

=== National efforts ===
Over the last several years, a large amount of philanthropic and research attention has been directed at remedial education programs. Often, focus on remedial education is directed at 1) increasing the successful completion of remedial sequences 2) increasing the overall number of students with college degrees and certificates in the US and 3) decreasing the cost of remedial education to colleges and states.

==== Complete College America ====
A national non-profit organization, Complete College America (CCA), was established in 2009 and looks at paths to improving higher education outcomes for all students. The organization has provided large amounts of national data on the proportion of students enrolled in remedial courses across demographic groups. The organization has also worked with states to set goals for increasing college completion and making adjustments to higher education policies. Currently, CCA heavily promotes enrolling more students directly into college-level courses even though they would traditionally test into remedial courses. The organization also heavily promotes better aligning remedial courses with college-level courses, and using diverse measures of student academic standing for remedial placement.

==== Achieving the Dream ====
Originally an initiative led by the Lumina Foundation, Achieving the Dream focuses on increasing the success of college students – particularly students of color and students from low-income backgrounds. Starting in 2004, the project funded promising, data-driven approaches to strengthening remedial education coursework. Achieving the Dream is its own national organization with the same mission: "community college student success and completion; focused primarily on helping low-income students and students of color complete their education and obtain market-valued credentials." The organization continues to fund positive interventions that move underprepared students through remediation with greater success and features a list of best practices and exemplary colleges from which other higher education administrators can learn. Achieving the Dream promotes many different interventions that can increase the success of students, including first-year student success courses that provide students with the skills to navigate college expectations and academics more effectively, accelerated remedial courses in math and English, student mentoring and coaching, mandatory orientations for new students and supplementary computer tutoring for remedial students. Achieving the Dream also takes an active role in state policy advocacy and is currently working in 15 states to strengthen student remedial success.

==== Core Principles Statement ====
In December 2012, the Dana Center at the University of Texas, Complete College America, Education Commission of the States, and Jobs for the Future released "Core Principles for Transforming Remedial Education: A Joint Statement" with seven key principles for strengthening community college remedial programs. The statement's principles included: aligning remedial courses with a student's long-term area of study at the college, using multiple measures to placement students in remedial courses, requiring all students – including under-prepared students – to pick a program of study when they enter college, integrating academic support services into pre-college-level coursework, creating accelerated course models with students with larger skill deficiencies, and measuring completion of remedial courses.

Strategies that accelerate students through remedial coursework and on to college-level (also called gatekeeper) courses are widely promoted as one path to increasing the success of under-prepared students.

==== Changes in North Carolina ====
In 2012, North Carolina underwent a wide-scale redesign of their remedial education programs. Branded as 'Success NC', the program's Developmental Education Initiative takes steps to redesign math and reading curricula, move students through remedial courses faster and better assess and place students. North Carolina colleges can now incorporate high school grades into their course placement decisions. Additionally, starting in 2014, all colleges deliver remedial reading and English in three shorter, eight-week modules for some students while allowing higher-level remedial students to enroll in college-level English courses with required supplementary English instruction.

==== Gates Foundation and Lumina Foundation ====
In 2009 the Bill and Melinda Gates Foundation appropriated $16.5 million to 15 colleges in five states to promote promising interventions in the remedial education. Fueled by the broader goal of increasing the number of college graduates nationwide, the Gates Foundation promoted remedial interventions that proved successful, particularly low-income students and students of color, through the Lumina Foundation's Achieving the Dream Initiative. A host of findings, recommendations and best practices – including 25 Steps to Effective Remedial Education – from the Gates Foundation and Lumina Foundation investments are available through the Development Education Initiative through Achieving the Dream.

=== Developmental education ===
Developmental education and remedial education are often used synonymously. They were both designed to teach college- and university-level coursework that is designed to make up for knowledge and ability gaps for students considered unprepared for college-level work. At California-based two-year institutions, such as community colleges, students enrolled in developmental education courses account for 40% of their undergraduates. At California-based four-year institutions, such as CSUs and UCs, every four out of ten students enroll in a minimum of one developmental education course.

From developmental education sprang the Accelerated Learning Program (ALP), which is a formal course of study. This program was initially started in part by Peter Adams at the Community College of Baltimore County. This program places a student who has been declared to need further progression in their education to meet college-level requirements to enroll in a first-year composition class where 50% of the students are ALP students and 50% have been placed in first-year composition. It is reported that 74% of students have passed first-year composition as a result of ALP. ALP is reported to be a well-known national program that has served as a template for hundreds of colleges across. The community college of Baltimore County is one college that has shown long-term statistics showing the effectiveness of this co-requisite program.

The variety of student demographics and their respective level of preparedness also play a role in the success of developmental education. A study done at the Community College Research Center at Columbia University found that students who were placed in developmental courses after scoring close to the college-level cutoffs appear to have experienced far more negative or no consequences. In contrast, students who fell just short of the upper- and lower-level developmental course cutoffs and were enrolled in the lower course experienced a higher percentage of beneficial results.

== In Europe ==
While remedial programmes are common in the United States, they are less common in Europe. Nevertheless, several European higher education institutes have started to offer remedial education programmes as well. One reason why European universities are starting to develop remedial courses is the different situation in the two continents. In the United States, a common assumption is that remediation attracts underprepared students of low socioeconomic status. Inadequate academic preparation is no longer a barrier to college access. In contrast, in Europe, a large part of the transitional problems are caused by differences among national secondary educational programmes, which are determined on a national level. Therefore, these students are hindered in effectively starting a bachelor or master programme. Remedial or developmental courses can help to bridge the gap.

=== European Framework of Transitional Preparatory/Remedial Teaching ===
To be able to compare and assess various preparatory courses in Europe, a European framework of transitional courses is necessary. By developing European Framework for Transitional Preparatory Courses (EFTPC), teachers around Europe can see how their design of their courses fit with the framework. In addition, potential improvements are identified and can be extended with the insights from the field. By using the wiki technology, each teacher can add his/her suggestions to the EFTPC. This Framework is being developed in frame of European project STEP (Studies on Transitional Electronic Programmes).

== Effectiveness ==
The question that rises is whether successful completion of a remedial course guarantees students' success in college. The literature provides limited evidence for the effectiveness of remedial courses on outcomes such as persistence to graduation, quality of performance in subsequent courses, drop-out, and grade point average. Many researchers claim that very little research has been conducted to investigate the effectiveness of remedial or developmental education and that research concerning the effectiveness of remedial education programs has been sporadic, underfunded, and inconclusive and has serious methodological flaws. Recently, efforts have been made to use more rigorous research designs (e.g. regression discontinuity design) to evaluate remedial effectiveness and suggest that post-remediation classroom composition (e.g., concentrated underpreparedness) moderates developmental education effectiveness efforts.

=== Metrics ===
One way of measuring the effectiveness of a developmental/remedial program is to investigate whether the enrolled students actually complete the remedial courses successfully. Several research studies have found that underprepared students who completed remedial coursework achieve greater academic success than underprepared students who did not complete remedial coursework or students who started college academically prepared. Such findings support McCabe's statement that successfully-remediated students perform well in standard college work.

Despite the claim that a number of rigorous studies using a regression discontinuity design have found underprepared students who score near placement test cut off scores and enroll in remedial education perform no better than similarly scoring students who place directly into college level courses, several studies have demonstrated developmental education programs provide benefit.

This may in part be due to the "leakage" that often occurs from the beginning of a developmental program to its end. Research from the Community College Research Center indicates that even students who successfully complete a developmental class often drop out of school before entering credit programs.

==== Acceleration programs ====
This has led to Acceleration in Developmental Education with the Community College of Baltimore County and the California Completion Project. These programs merge (in different ways) developmental classes with credit classes.

=== Success factors ===
Kozeracki (2002) distinguishes seven commonly cited elements that are associated with student success in developmental programs:

- Orientation, assessment, and placement are mandatory for new students
- Clearly specified goals and objectives are established for courses and programs
- The adult learning theory is applied in the design and delivery of the courses
- The courses are highly structured
- The programs are centralized or highly coordinated
- Counseling, tutoring, and supplemental instruction components are included
- The social and emotional development of the students is taken into consideration

Other research suggests that "bridge" programs that integrate basic skills and remedial education with higher-level content or technical training can produce substantially better results than traditional remedial programs.

== Online remedial education ==
Online remedial education is defined as an instruction method using information and communication technologies (ICT) which helps students to provide knowledge and skills necessary to succeed in university. This way, foreign students can study in their home country, which reduces their costs while at the same time offering flexibility to develop their knowledge and skills. ICT has the power to support independent learning as well as to learn irrespective of time and geographical constraints with the widespread implementation of the internet.

=== Advantages and disadvantages ===
Advantages and possibilities:

- Flexible instructional pace and flexible class participation
- Elimination of barriers of time and space
- Cost-effectiveness of online courses
- Electronic research availability (digital libraries and online databases)
- A well-designed online course makes it easy for students to navigate and find the adequate information

Disadvantages and problems:

- Delayed feedback from the instructor
- Unavailable technical support from the instructor
- Lack of self-regulation and self-motivation
- Sense of isolation, caused by the lack of interpersonal communication and interaction among students or between students and the instructor, or caused by the use of monotonous instructional methods
- A poorly designed course interface makes students feel lost in seeking information

=== Role of teachers ===
In order to provide a positive experience and to ensure the effectiveness of online remedial courses, the tutor's roles in designing and organizing the learning experience, providing technical advice and support, encouraging and facilitating discussion, encouraging participation, using a variety of forms of instruction, and resolving communication problems are crucial.

=== Collaborative tools ===
A recent development in collaborative working and learning is the use of synchronous tools like web-videoconferences whereby learners meet online at a fixed time (synchronous) in an online classroom. While web-videoconferencing is not a new phenomenon, tools like Skype, MSN Web Messenger and Adobe Acrobat Connect allow learners to efficiently communicate using free or low cost technology such as a simple desktop computer. Until recently, such basic technology would only allow for asynchronous learning, as for example in discussion groups.

== See also ==
- Adult education
- Adult high school
- College-preparatory school
- Kumon
- Learning disability
- Special Assistance Program (Australian education)
- Twice exceptional

== Sources ==
- Attewell, P., Lavin, D., Domina, T., and Levey, T. (2006). New evidence on college remediation. Journal of Higher Education, 77, 886–924.
- Bahr, P. R. (2007). Double jeopardy: Testing the effects of multiple basic skill deficiencies on successful remediation. Research in Higher Education, 48, 695–725.
- Bahr, P. R. (2008a). Does mathematics remediation work?: A comparative analysis of academic attainment among community college students. Research in Higher Education, 49(5), 420–450.
- Bahr, P. R. (2008b). Cooling Out in the community college: What is the effect of academic advising on students' chances of success? Research in Higher Education, 49(8), 704–732.
- Barry, W. J. (2011–2012). "Developmental Education.org". Developmental Education.org.
- Bettinger, E., & Long, B. T. (2005). Remediation at the community college: Student participation and outcomes. New Directions for Community Colleges, 129, 17–26.
- Brants, L., & Struyven, K. (2009). Literature Review on Online Remedial Education: A European Perspective. Industry and Higher Education, 23(4), 269–275.
- Burley, H., Butner, B., & Cejda, B. (2001). Dropout and stopout patterns among developmental education students in Texas community colleges. Community College Journal of Research and Practice, 25, 767–782.
- Crews, D. M., & Aragon, S. R. (2004). Influence of a community college developmental education writing course on academic performance. Community College Review, 23, 1–18.
- Deil-Amen, R., and Rosenbaum, J. E. (2002). The unintended consequences of stigma-free remediation. Sociology of Education, 75, 249–268.
- Hadden, C. (2000). The ironies of mandatory placement. Community College Journal of Research and Practice, 24, 823–838.
- Hagedorn, L. S., Siadat, M. V., Fogel, S. F., Nora, A., and Pascarella, E. T. (1999). Success in college mathematics: Comparisons between remedial and nonremedial first-year college students. Research in Higher Education, 40, 261–284.
- Hoyt, J. E. (1999). Remedial education and student attrition. Community College Review, 27, 51–73.
- Illich, P. A., Hagan, C., & McCallister, L. (2004). Performance in college-level courses among students concurrently enrolled in remedial courses: Policy implications. Community College Journal of Research and Practice, 28, 435–453.
- Kozeracki, C. A. (2002). ERIC review: Issues in developmental education. Community College Review, 29, 83–101.
- Kurzet, R. (1997). Quality versus quantity in the delivery of developmental programs for ESL students. New Directions for Community Colleges, 100, 53–62.
- Levin, H. M., and Calcagno, J. C. (2008). Remediation in the community college: An evaluator's perspective. Community College Review, 35, 181–207.
- Mazzeo, C. (2002). Stakes for students: Agenda-setting and remedial education. Review of Higher Education, 26, 19–39.
- McCabe, R. 2000. No One to Waste: A Report to Public Decision-makers and Community College Leaders. Washington, DC: Community College Press.
- McCusker, M. (1999). ERIC review: Effective elements of developmental reading and writing programs. Community College Review, 27, 93–105.
- Merisotis, J. P., & Phipps, R. A. (2000). Remedial education in colleges and universities: What's really going on?. Review of Higher Education, 24, 67–85.
- Moss, B. G., Kelcey, B., & Showers, N. (2014). Does Classroom Composition Matter? College Classrooms as Moderators of Developmental Education Effectiveness. Community College Review, 42(3), 201–220.
- Moss, B.G. & Yeaton, WH. (2006) "Shaping Policies Related to Developmental Education: An Evaluation Using the Regression-Discontinuity Design," Educational Evaluation and Policy Analysis, 28 (3), 215–229.
- Moss, B. G. & Yeaton, W. H. (2013). Evaluating Effects of Developmental Education for College Students Using a Regression Discontinuity Design. Evaluation review, 37, 370–404.
- Moss, B. G., Yeaton, W. H., & Lloyd, J. E. (2014). Evaluating the Effectiveness of Developmental Mathematics by Embedding a Randomized Experiment Within a Regression Discontinuity Design. Educational Evaluation and Policy Analysis, 36, 170–185.
- Oudenhoven, B. (2002). Remediation at the community college: Pressing issues, uncertain solutions. New Directions for Community Colleges, 117, 35–44.
- Parsad, B., Lewis, L., and Greene, B. (2003). Remedial education at degree-granting postsecondary institutions in Fall 2000 (NCES 2004-010). Washington, D.C.: National Center for Education Statistics.
- Perin, D. (2004). Remediation beyond developmental education: The use of learning assistance centers to increase academic preparedness in community colleges. Community College Journal of Research and Practice, 28, 559–582.
- Perin, D., Keselman, A., & Monopoli, M. (2003). The academic writing of community college remedial students: Text and learner variables. Higher Education, 45, 19–42.
- Perry, M., Bahr, P. R., Rosin, M., & Woodward, K. M. (2010). Course-Taking Patterns, Policies, and Practices in Developmental Education in the California Community Colleges. A Report to the California Community Colleges Chancellor's Office. EdSource.
- Rienties, B., Tempelaar, D., Waterval, D., Rehm, M., & Gijselaers, W. H.(2006). Remedial online teaching on a summer course. Industry and Higher Education, 20(5), 327–336.
- Rienties, B., Tempelaar, D. T., Dijkstra, J., Rehm, M., & Gijselaers, W. H. (2008). Longitudinal study of online remedial education effects. In N. P. Barsky, M. Clements, J. Ravn & K. Smith (Eds.), Advances in Business Education and Training 1: The Power of Technology for Learning (pp. 43–59). Dordrecht: Springer.
- Saxon, D. P., & Boylan, H. R. (2001). The cost of remedial education in higher education. Journal of Developmental Education, 25, 2–8.
- Waycaster, P. (2001). Factors impacting success in community college developmental mathematics courses and subsequent courses. Community College Journal of Research and Practice, 25, 403–416.
- Weissman, J., Silk, E., and Bulakowski, C. (1997). Assessing developmental education policies. Research in Higher Education, 38, 187–200.
- Worley, J. (2003). Developmental reading instruction, academic attainment and performance among underprepared college students. Journal of Applied Research in the Community College, 10, 127–136.
