= Hawthorn Teachers College =

Technical teacher training college in Victoria Australia established 1954

Hawthorn Teachers College is an educational institution in Victoria, Australia. Originally established to train teachers for technical schools, it expanded through a series of name changes and organisational restructures. Until 1996, the institution focused on preparing educators in both academic and trade subjects for the expanding technical school system post-WWII. Since amalgamation with the University of Melbourne, it has specialised in English language and pathway programs for international students.

Since 1951, the institution’s name has changed several times, including Technical Teachers' Training Centre, Hawthorn Technical Teacher's College, The State College of Victoria at Hawthorn, Hawthorn Institute of Education, and Hawthorn-Melbourne. It has also been informally referred to as Hawthorn Teachers College and Hawthorn College of Advanced Education.

== Background ==
Following the Education Act 1910, the expansion of state technical schools in Victoria created high demand for specialist teachers in mathematics, science, engineering, arts, and trades. Initially, this need was met through a student teacher training scheme in which promising technical school students combined specialist studies with limited pedagogical instruction and classroom teaching.

After completing their technical courses, these student teachers undertook industry or trade experience before being appointed as classified teachers. In 1937–38, the original scheme was replaced with a more structured system. Qualified tradesmen who completed apprenticeships and accrued four to five years as journeymen were selected as student instructors. They enrolled in a two-year, part-time evening teacher-training program before classification. At the same time, academically promising students in art, science, mathematics, and engineering received technical teaching scholarships. These scholarships required completion of diploma studies followed by two years of industrial experience. Pedagogical training continued in evening classes during industry placement and early teaching appointments.

== Technical Teachers' Training Centre ==
A major reorganisation of teacher recruitment in 1951 replaced teaching scholarships with a technical studentship system. In 1952, the first full-time day training course for studentship holders commenced at the newly established Technical Teachers' Training Centre, located within Melbourne Technical College (now RMIT). Attendance initially comprised two and a half days per week.

In 1954, the Victorian Education Department officially granted the centre teachers’ college status. In April 1955, the first principal was appointed, marking the institution’s transition to a recognised tertiary college. Between 1952 and 1973, annual enrolments expanded from 57 students to over 1,100. Physical accommodation struggled to keep pace: initially confined to a single lecture room, the college progressively occupied additional spaces at Melbourne Technical College. In September 1957, the college relocated to Toorak, occupying the former Toorak Primary Teachers’ College premises. By 1964, these facilities proved inadequate, and classes were dispersed to external venues. Additional accommodation became available in late 1966 at Lansell Road, Toorak, in buildings formerly used by the Occupational Therapy School of Victoria.

In August 1970, the college moved to a purpose-built facility on Auburn Road, Hawthorn. The campus, largely financed by Commonwealth grants, included a multipurpose hall, squash courts, cafeteria, common rooms, and a theatrette, along with audio-visual and closed-circuit television facilities.

== State College of Victoria at Hawthorn ==
Under the State College of Victoria Act 1972 Hawthorn Technical Teacher's College became the State College of Victoria at Hawthorn (or 'State College, Hawthorn') in 1973. The Victorian Post-Secondary Education Act in the late 1970s made the Hawthorn Institute of Education an independent institution training educators for TAFE (Technical and Further Education) Colleges and governed by its own statutory council. In 1975, enrolments exceeded 1,200 students. TAFE teachers' Information needs met through library resources began with a 1978 project carried out by the State College of Victoria at Hawthorn identifying print and non-print resource materials relevant to TAFE teacher preparation and development, resulting in a master subject and title file of library holdings of participating colleges, and from British and American sources.

=== Art collection ===
Like other teacher's colleges with an art education stream, Hawthorn State College established a significant art collection focused primarily on Australian printmaking. The collection, later referred to as the Hawthorn Institute of Education Collection, includes works by prominent 20th-century Australian artists, among them being: Ian Armstrong, Ray Beattie, Brian Blanchflower, Barbara Brash, Geoffrey Brown, Jack Courier, Astrid Dahl, Ruth Faerber, Robert Grieve, Sue Grounds, Barbara Hanrahan, Noela Hjorth, Louis Kahan, Roger Kemp, Grahame King, Hertha Kluge-Pott, Mary Macqueen, Ann Newmarch, and Eric Thake. Following the 1991 merger of the Hawthorn Institute of Education with the University of Melbourne, some of these works were incorporated the University of Melbourne Art Collection and the Ian Potter Museum of Art which manages it. In 2022, when the University sold the surplus Hawthorn campus site, many artworks previously displayed there were either relocated to other campuses or moved into permanent storage within the University's centralised cultural collections.

=== School-based teacher programs ===
In the mid-1970s students expressed dissatisfaction with the lack real-world experience in the one-year post-graduate diploma in education programs and Hawthorn, along with a number of Australian teacher education institutions introduced school-based teacher programs, now commonplace; and small pilot programs alternative to the mainstream program and then conducted only partly in schools, one being the Ballam Park school-based program among eleven such programs introduced at the State College of Victoria at Hawthorn in 1975.

== 1980s ==
In the 1980s, despite threats to close the college down on recommendations of the Review of Commonwealth Functions, Hawthorn served to address what college principal Gordon Bail saw as a "critical shortage" of technical teachers, advised the department on sport in primary education, initiated the training of teachers in traffic education for young students, and with Dr Maurice Brygel, who advised on health education at the college, collaborated in developed a pioneering video training series. Tech Talk, an eight-part Channel 0 television programs hosted by Michael Schildberger, was aimed at teenagers seeking technical career because of the paucity of information on the availability of technical education, and was produced by Ian Gonella in association with the Hawthorn college. Norman Lacy MP, Assistant Minister of Education opened the seminar for Special Assistance Resource Teachers at the college on 15 December 1980. The National TAFE Teacher Education Conference was held at Hawthorn in 1981, and College publications supported the work of the Australian Council for Educational Research.

In 1982 Federal Minister for Education in the Liberal Fraser Government, Senator Baume indicated a resolution to withdraw funding from six Colleges of Advanced Education nationally unless they moved to amalgamate, and in Victoria (whose government was Labor) those included Hawthorn, Melbourne State College, and the Institute of Early Childhood Development. Victorian Minister for Education, Robert Fordham, responded with efforts that he felt could be "educationally sound" and was exploring the amalgamation of Hawthorn Institute with the Melbourne State College.

== Hawthorn Institute of Education ==
Under the Victorian Post-Secondary Education Act, the Hawthorn Institute of Education was proclaimed in 1982. While it continued to train technical teachers locally, various centres were then created to serve the Hawthorn Institute's international clientele:

- Overseas Projects Unit
- The Commercial Unit
- The Centre for International Teaching, Training and Development
- Hawthorn International Education
- Hawthorn Consulting Group
- International Projects Division
- Hawthorn English Language Centre
- IELTS testing centre

== Impact ==
The 1985 Australian Bureau of Statistics annual report identified Hawthorn Institute of Education as "one of Australia's most important training centres for technical teachers, instructors, and trainees," its courses being broad, expanding and relevant to specialist students, having developed from early beginnings as the Technical Teachers' Training Centre and evolving through a number of iterations "to its present position as a leading college of advanced education".

The report noted that in TAFE teacher education and technical training Hawthorn utilised its links with educational institutions national and international and to the public and private sectors of industry and commerce. In 1985 it offered two courses in initial teacher training — the Diploma of Technical Teaching and the Graduate Diploma in Education, for adults already expert in a vocation other than teaching and with mature experience of responsibility, through courses appropriate to the needs of such recruits in their adult status. In-service Staff Development in colleges and schools, was offered through: INSERT (In-Service Education and Training), a co-ordinating unit of purpose-oriented programmes of workshops, short courses, units of study, and curriculum assistance, both on campus at Hawthorn and in any individual student's own organisation; post-initial award courses focusing on teacher development, with included the Graduate Diploma in Graphic Communication Education, Graphic Diploma in Educational Studies in the area of Student Care, and Bachelor of Education (Technical); and instruction in educational management and administration in a Graduate Dipioma in Educational Administration, and support consultations and short programmes in the Institute's Centre for Educational Administration and Management. Hawthorn also served industry and commerce through instructor training, offering modules for vocational training instructor qualifications, and programs in materials development, research into training, and consultancy services addressing training matters.

Australia's near neighbours, the ASEAN/South Pacific countries, the ABS reports, regarded Hawthorn as a valued secondary and post-secondary technical/vocational education (TAFE) provider, important to the economic and social development of their countries. Hawthorn was involved in the Indonesia/Australian Technical Education Project for the Australian Development Assistance Bureau (ADAB), an agency of the Department of Foreign Affairs, providing advice to the Director of Technical and Vocational Education on curriculum development and teacher training; the equipping, planning, and education development of a Middle Technical School at Cilacap; training of staff for the Vocational Education Department Centre (and Technical Teacher Training Centre) at Bandung; and at Jakarta, in particular for the Management and Technical Centre.

The college hosted the launch of the Bicentennial Futures Education Project in 1986, at which the Leader of the Australian Democrats, Senator Janine Haines, and the Minister for Science, Mr Barry Jones, addressed educators, industrialists, bureaucrats, and at which then Minister for Education, Senator Susan Ryan decried the low retention rates of students in late secondary years. In 1989, Hawthorn lecturers were commissioned to undertake an expert evaluation of Mount Scopus College.

== Amalgamation with University of Melbourne ==
When the college was affiliated with the University of Melbourne by the Melbourne University (Hawthorn) Act 1991 (No. 69 of 1991), Geography teacher and associate of the Hawthorn Institute of Education Dr Kevin Blachford spoke on the value of relevant and diverse curricula, teachers who treated students as individuals, encouraged questioning and the "expression of a wide range of talents," who shared resources and mutual feedback and actively devised teaching strategies.

=== Relocation and reconfiguration ===
The college formally amalgamated with the University of Melbourne in 1996. "Hawthorn-Melbourne" moved in 2024 to a new campus at 333 Exhibition Street, in the Melbourne CBD. Hawthorn-Melbourne is a specialist institutional provider of English language intensive courses through which it prepares international students for further study in Australia and as pathway for international students to tertiary institutions and high schools.

== Notable alumni (staff and students) ==
- Colin Arrowsmith, Associate Professor at RMIT University
- Trevor J. A. Batrouney OAM, historian
- Ralph K. Blunden, Hawthorn art educator
- Jack Brake, footballer
- Roger Butler OAM, art historian/curator and writer
- Helen Christou, textiles teacher, Dept. Education and Early Childhood Development
- Michael Cigler, Czech-born writer and teacher at Hawthorn
- Phillip Cobbin, Principal Fellow, Department of Accounting, University of Melbourne
- Ben Fennessy, painter
- Noel Flood, artist/educator
- Bruce Hall industrial and product designer
- Graeme Hare, artist
- Merle Hathaway, art educator, gallery director
- Geoffrey Hogg, artist
- Reg Lipsom, marine biologist
- The Hon. Mr Justice Kenneth Joseph Jenkinson, QC, Supreme Court judge, 1975–1982
- Bob Jenyns, sculptor
- Carol Jerrems, Australian photographer
- Laurel McKenzie, artist
- Margaret F. Mayers, architect
- Doug Newton, State Labor Party politician
- Jack Potter, Australian cricketer
- Barry Rowe, Labor Party state politician
- John Scurry, artist
- Frank Sheehan (Australian politician)
- Margaret O. Sheppard, architect
- Sharman Stone, Liberal Party politician
- Barry Tate, artist
- Ray Taylor, ceramicist
- Graeme Wigg, educator
