= Toru Kumon =

Japanese mathematics educator (1914–1995)

- 公文 公
- Pronunciation: Kumon Tōru
- Born: March 26, 1914; Ōtsu Village, Nagaoka District, Kōchi Prefecture, Empire of Japan
- Died: July 25, 1995 (aged 81); Osaka, Japan
- Education: Osaka University (BS)
- Occupations: Educator, founder of Kumon
- Known for: Creating the Kumon Method of Learning

Toru Kumon (公文 公, Kumon Tōru; March 26, 1914 – July 25, 1995) was a Japanese mathematics educator. He was born in Kōchi Prefecture, Japan. He graduated from the College of Science at Osaka University with a degree in mathematics and taught high school mathematics in his home town of Osaka.

In 1954, his son, Takeshi, performed poorly in a Year 2 mathematics test. Prompted by his wife, Teiko, Toru closely examined Takeshi's textbooks and believed they lacked the proper opportunity for a child to practice and master a topic. He wrote worksheets each day for his son. By the time Takeshi was in Year 6, he was able to solve differential and integral calculus. This was the beginning of the Kumon Method of Learning.

Other parents became interested in Kumon's ideas, and in 1955, the first Kumon Center was opened in Osaka. In 1958, Toru Kumon founded the Kumon Institute of Education.

Toru Kumon died in Osaka on July 25, 1995, at the age of 81 from pneumonia. There is a Toru Kumon museum in Osaka. Asteroid 3569 Kumon is named after him.
