= Independent Contractors Australia =

- Abbreviation: ICA
- Formation: 1999
- Type: Not-For-Profit
- Legal status: Association
- Purpose: Representation of independent contractors in the Australian workplace
- Headquarters: Melbourne, Victoria
- Location: Australia
- Website: http://www.independentcontractors.net.au

Independent Contractors of Australia (ICA) was established in 1999, with the aim to create a national association to represent independent contractors in the Australian workplace. Independent contractors operate in the workplace by contracting out their services rather than being engaged under an employment agreement. They are able to be distinguished from employees by some key differences. Independent contractors operate their business entity in order to provide a good or service for an agreed price usually stipulated in a commercial contract. Other differences are that in most cases independent contractors are paid for the results they achieve; provide the materials and equipment needed to complete the work they do and are free to delegate their work to others. Also, they are free to accept or refuse work and may make a profit or a loss from the contracts they enter into with their clients. ICA is a not-for-profit association incorporated under the Associations Incorporation Act (1981) of Victoria.

== Governance ==
ICA is governed by a Board under the rules established by its Articles of Association.

=== Articles of Association ===
The articles under which ICA was established determine that the purpose of the association is:

1. to uphold and defend the right of all eligible Australians to engage in the labour market as free and independent contractors, and to be recognised by governments, tax officials and regulators as independent contractors;
2. to engage in lobbying and public debate to ensure that the Australian community is aware that if Australians' rights to engage freely in the labour market are impaired or denied, then the rights of all Australians to live in freedom will be at risk;
3. to maintain the common law distinctions which the courts have made between employment and contract in labour market relationships;
4. to take all such action as the association or the committee shall think conducive to the attainment of these objectives.

=== Board ===
The ICA constitution requires the election of ten Board members, with four who are independent contractors, up to at least three who are company members, and up to three who are association members. The elected Board can then appoint an additional two members.

=== Past presidents ===
- The Hon Norman Lacy (November 2008 – Present)
- Marie-Louise MacDonald (December 2007-November 2008)
- Michael Kelson (April 2007-December 2007)
- Angela MacRae (July 2005-April 2007)
- Bob Day (2001-July 2005)

=== Executive Director ===
Ken Phillips has been Executive Director of ICA since 2000.

== Funding, membership, and location ==
ICA is funded by its membership fees and revenue raised from sponsorship, advertising and events. Membership is open to independent contractors; to companies who engage independent contractors; and to industry associations whose members engage independent contractors. Membership fees range from $50 per annum for individual affiliate members to $12,000 per annum for industry associations with more than 201 member companies.

There are 1.1 million independent contractors in the Australian workforce of 11.3 million. However, Other Business Operators (OBOs) are also self-employed and make up another 1 million workers.

The Australian Bureau of Statistics (ABS) separates OBOs from independent contractors on the basis that they are self-employed workers whose primary activity is managing others (i.e. they have employees) and/or selling goods and services to earn income rather than relying on the provision of their labour. Whereas independent contractors are defined as workers who provide their time and labour and who only manage themselves. Hence the self-employed total 2.1 million and make up 18.6% of the total workforce.

FORM OF EMPLOYMENT	2008	2009	2010	2008/2010
	(000)	(000)	(000)	(%)
Total Workforce	10,651.1	10,664.9	11,300.0	5.74
Employees	8,619.6	8,660.9	9,2000.0 !! 6.31	
Independent Contractors	967.1	1,029.0	1,100.0 !! 12.08	
Other Business Operators	1,064.4	975.0	1,000.0 !! -6.44	
Total Self Employed	2,0331.5	2,004.0	2,100.0	3.26
Self Employed/Workforce (%)	19.07	18.79	18.58	

ICA is based in Melbourne, Victoria. Board meetings are held monthly at 150 Lonsdale Street, Melbourne,

== Mission ==
ICA's mission is to:

- present to Government and the public a clear and positive view of independent contractors;
- provide an ideal legal and professional framework in which independent contractors can thrive and feel legally secure;
- support members by creating an environment that allows them to grow within the economy;
- provide members with access to relevant services, including education, literature and news updates.

== Campaigns ==
ICA's lobbying campaigns have focused on:

2000-2001 the introduction of the Personal Services Income (Tax) legislation;

2003–6 participation in the International Labour Organization (ILO) debates regarding the Scope of the Employment Relationship resulting in a 2006 ILO Recommendation protecting the legitimacy of independent contractors and the commercial contract.

2005–6 the introduction of the Independent Contractors' Act (2006).

2007-2011 the establishment of Small Business Commissioners in each state and territory and in the Commonwealth Government.

2009-12 the development and promotion of Charter of Contractual Fairness to governments and corporations and to have the Trade Practices Act amended to extend the protections for contractual fairness, available to consumers, to small businesses.
