= Special Assistance Program (Australian education) =

Education assistance program

The development and implementation of the Special Assistance Program in Victorian Primary Schools during the period 1979 – 1982 constituted the most significant innovation in the provision of special education services to children experiencing learning difficulties and in addressing declining literacy and numeracy standards. Up until the political directive to initiate this program was given, there had been no policy within the Department of Education and Early Childhood Development directing Principals of Primary Schools to develop special programs for pupils at risk of illiteracy and innumeracy.

== Declining literacy and numeracy skills ==
From the early 1960s, the Education Department of Victoria (Australia), had developed an extensive range of programs in primary schools that sought to develop the individual ability of each pupil. Also, the ratio of pupils to teachers in schools had been significantly reduced over time and schools had become much more independent in the development of school based remedial programs.

In spite of this, there existed large numbers of children in Victorian primary and secondary schools urgently in need of special assistance in the essential skills of literacy and numeracy. This situation was reflected in the Australian Parliament's House of Representatives Select Committee on Specific Learning Difficulties in 1976. The committee had commissioned research by the Australian Council for Educational Research (ACER) that found that 15% to 20% of children completing their primary education had not achieved a functional level of literacy.

== Government intervention ==
In late May 1979, within a month of being reelected, the Hamer Liberal Government announced Victoria's first major review of its educational policies for more than 50 years.

Anticipating the new direction, in July 1979, the Assistant Minister of Education, Norman Lacy established a Ministerial Committee on Special Assistance Programs. The committee consisted of people drawn from school staffs, special education facilities, teacher training institutions and the Education Department administration. The committee's report was the basis upon which the Special Assistance Program was established.

The process for the establishment of the Special Assistance Program in Victorian Primary Schools was outlined in a speech Mr Lacy delivered to Special Assistance Resource Teachers (SARTs) at a seminar held at Hawthorn State College (Victoria, Australia) on 15 December 1980. In it he announced the most significant development in remedial education in Victoria with a strategic plan for addressing falling literacy and numeracy standards. The totally new component of the Special Assistance Program was the provision of 1000 SARTs for "the delivery of services to children with special needs." These designated teachers were given "a major on-site school responsibility for facilitating a productive relationship between parents and pupils and teachers." The program involved the training of these primary teachers as SARTs and their placement in schools. Their role was the early detection and remediation of children at risk of illiteracy and innumeracy.

== Special Assistance Resource Teachers ==
The core element of this change in the delivery of special educational services to children was the new role of the school based Special Assistance Resource Teacher (SART), which was the focus of in class room integration of pupils experiencing learning difficulties. The role incorporated all the elements of the service previously performed by external consultants visiting schools.

As a result, from the beginning of the 1981 school year SARTs were designated by their schools and appointed to the 575 primary schools with enrolments of greater than 300 pupils. They were mandated to establish the Special Assistance Program in their schools. The Education Department's Special Services Division and the Primary Division monitored the progress of the implementation and produced a number of evaluative reports that were presented to the Minister.

From the beginning of the 1982 school year, schools with an enrolment of between 150 and 300 pupils designated and appointed a SART to carry out the role on a half-time basis. This resulted in and additional 302 primary schools in Victoria having a school based resource teacher, bringing the total to 877 schools. It was not planned to designate a SART at schools with less than 150 pupils. At such schools it was planned that the Principal or an appointed staff member would access services from the Special Assistance Resource Centres for children at these schools in need of such services.

== In-service training courses for SARTs ==
A major component of stage one was the in-service education component for the SARTs designated by their schools for the new role. A survey of the qualifications and experience of the 575 designated SARTs was undertaken to assess their training requirements. The responses indicated that 200 of the designated teachers had already completed special education training courses. Of these 102 were also experienced in special education teaching. As well 28 of the 375 remaining designated teachers were experienced special education teachers. AREA shared a concern that teachers undertaking SART duties were not qualified in special education, but their proposals to the course committee were rejected.

== Special Assistance Resource Centres ==
The Report of the Victorian Ministerial Committee on Special Assistance Programs (1980), in one of its major recommendations, identified the need to reorganise and integrate the range of specialist professional services available (external to the school) into a single co-ordinated service. To implement this recommendation, Norman Lacy established a Working Party within the Victorian Education Department to examine and report on the means to achieve this objective.

Early in 1981, work began on planning for the reorganisation all the relevant special education services provided by the Education Department into a single co-ordinated service delivery system under the Special Assistance Program.

As a result, a reorganised multi-disciplinary service was created on a "one stop" referral basis through 50 statewide Special Assistance Resource Centres allocated one to each Primary Education Inspectoral District throughout Victoria. the professional disciplines offered at each centre included: educational psychology, social work, speech therapy and special education. The availability of these services to primary schools was accessed and co-ordinated by the designated SART within each school and in schools with less than 150 pupils by the Principal.

== Demise ==
In April 1982, the Cain Labor Government was elected with commitments to the VTU including the reduction of class sizes in primary schools by redeploying SARTs back to class teaching roles.

AREA reported that "the SART concept would eventually give way to new policies under the Department of Education integration program. By 1982 SAR teachers were no longer being appointed to primary schools, leaving individual schools to decide whether to appoint a SAR teacher from their staffing allocation. There was no indication of what curriculum and in-service support would be provided for schools conducting a special assistance program..."
