= Helen Lempriere National Sculpture Award =

The Helen Lempriere National Sculpture Award at Werribee Park was an Australian prize for sculpture, awarded from 2000 until 2008. It was named in honour of artist Helen Lempriere. From 2010, the Helen Lempriere Scholarship was awarded to three recipients selected in the Sculpture by the Sea in Sydney.

== History and description ==
The Helen Lempriere National Sculpture Award at Werribee Park was instituted in 2000. It provided a total of A$145,000 in prizes to award recipients each year, making it Australia's most financially rewarding prize for sculpture.

An exhibition of the finalists was held each year in the grounds of Werribee Park, Werribee, Victoria. The award was acquisitive, and winners were brought into the collection displayed along the Sculpture Walk at Werribee Park. The local government authority, Wyndham City Council, would also purchase works for deployment as sculptural installations in the municipality.

In 2009, the award was withheld when a new selection process for finalists (a change from application to invitation) resulted in what The Age newspaper called "a disaster", when an insufficient number of entries of good standard led to the withholding of the exhibition and award for that year.

The trustees of the Helen Lempriere Bequest, Perpetual Private Wealth, announced in December 2009 that the award would no longer be made. Rather than being organised under its own auspices at Werribee Park, the award would instead be absorbed into the Sydney-based Sculpture by the Sea award.

== List of winners ==
- 2001 (inaugural prize) - Karen Ward, Hut
- 2002 - Nigel Helyer, Meta-Diva
- 2003 - Gary Wilson, Untitled
- 2004 - Richard Goodwin, Prosthetic Apartment B
- 2005 - William Eicholtz, The Comrade's Reward
- 2006 - Alexander Knox, Death of a White Good
- 2007 - Julia Davis, Meniscii
- 2008 - Bob Jenyns, Pont de l'archeveche
- 2009 - Award withheld

== Helen Lempriere Scholarship ==
On 23 December 2009, David Knowles of Perpetual Private Wealth announced that the new manager of the Lempriere award would be the Sculpture by the Sea organisation, and that in 2010, the award would comprise three A$30,000 scholarships for sculptors.
