= Storefront school =

School located in a non-traditional building

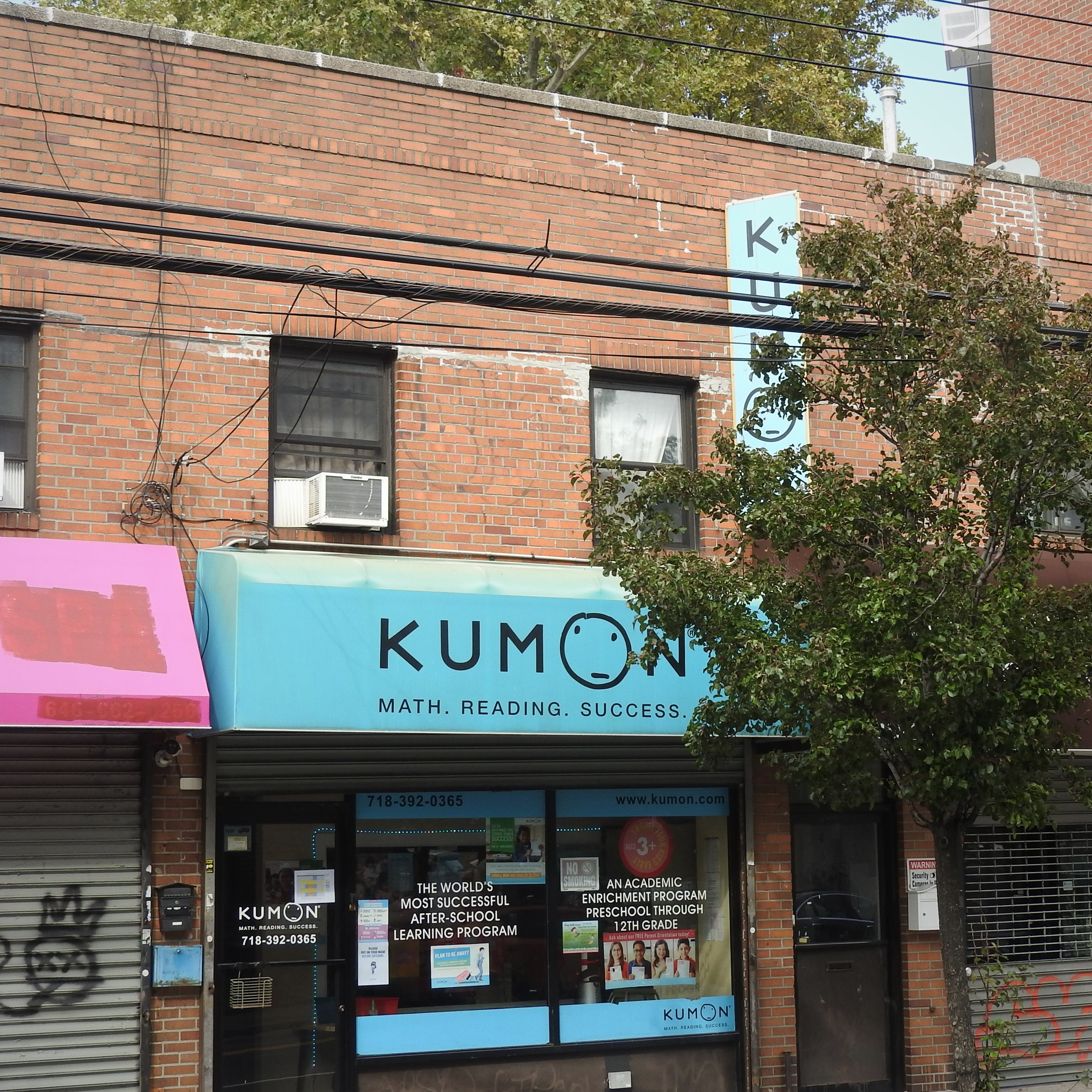
Kumon school in New York City

A storefront school is a school that uses rented space, typically originally intended for retail, instead of a dedicated, purpose-built school building. Many are used for continuing education and upgrading by mature students or other students who do not need or want the facilities or social atmosphere associated with traditional schools.

Storefront schools are common in Canada.

== Examples ==
Storefront School in Ottawa, Ontario (part of Ottawa-Carleton District School Board), "is designed to serve 19- to 21-year-old adults with intellectual disabilities who have had prior successful independent Co-op placements. Storefront students come from a variety of programs within the city of Ottawa. This two-year transition program focuses on increasing independence and employability skills."

School District 23 Central Okanagan's three storefront schools in British Columbia offer "an alternate program for students in grades 7 - 9 who are typically between the ages of 12 to 16 [...] students attending are typically at risk of dropping out of school or find the more traditional regular school unable to meet their learning styles [...] Students attend 2 hours daily and are assigned to one teacher at a set time. Successful students in our school typically move on to our Grade 10 Program or return to a regular school or enter the work force."

Greater St. Albert Catholic Schools's St. Gabriel Storefront School in Alberta was created in 2007 as a merger of the district's previous outreach and online school programs.

As part of its outreach department Edmonton Public Schools operates five "Learning Stores".
