= Kumon =

Educational company based in Japan

Kumon Institute of Education Co., Ltd.
- Logo used since 2002
- Native name: 株式会社公文教育研究会
- Type: Private
- Industry: Education
- Founded: 11 July 1958; 68 years ago
- Founder: Toru Kumon
- Key people: Hidenori Ikegami, President
- Products: Kumon Math, and Kumon Languages (varies by country)
- Website: kumon.org

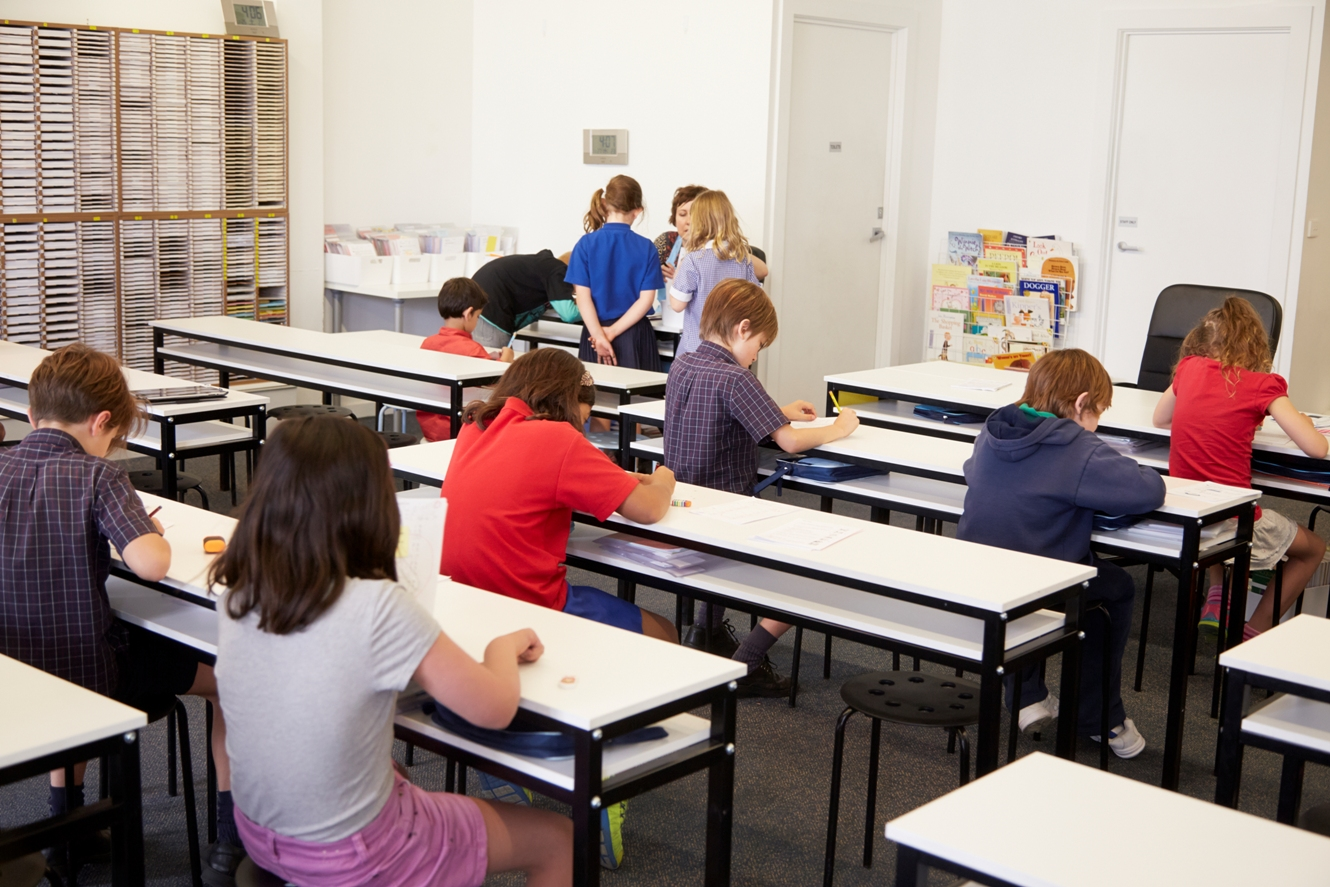
A Kumon center

Kumon Institute of Education Co. Ltd. (株式会社公文教育研究会, Kabushiki gaisha Kumon Kyōiku Kenkyūkai) is an educational network based in Japan and created by Toru Kumon. It uses his "Kumon Method" to teach mathematics and reading, primarily to young students.

== History ==
Japanese mathematics educator Toru Kumon founded Kumon in 1958, when he opened the first Kumon Math Center in Moriguchi, Osaka. Before creating the Kumon franchise, Kumon taught at Kochi Municipal High School and Tosa Junior/Senior High School. Inspired by teaching his son, Takeshi, Kumon developed a curriculum focused on rote memorization. In 1974, Kumon opened its first center outside Japan in New York, marking the beginning of its international expansion.

The company gained 63,000 students in its first 16 years. In 1974, Kumon published The Secret of Kumon Math, a book that led to a doubling of its size in the next two years. Kumon opened its first United States locations in 1983, and by 1985, it had 1.4 million students.

Kumon attracted national attention in the U.S. after it was implemented at Sumiton Elementary School in Sumiton, Alabama. Sumiton continued to use the Kumon program through 2001.

Kumon has over 26,000 centers worldwide with over 4 million registered students. In 2018, there were 410,000 students enrolled in 2,200 centers in the U.S. There are Kumon centers in over 60 countries and regions worldwide.

In North America, Kumon began a "Junior Kumon" program in 2001, targeted at children aged from 2 to 5 years old.

== Kumon method ==
Kumon is an enrichment or remedial program, where instructors and assistants tailor instructions to individual students.

All Kumon programs are pencil-and-worksheet-based, with a digital program that started in 2023. The worksheets increase in difficulty in small increments.

A 1994 study by Nancy Ukai observed a high degree of efficacy. However, psychologist Kathy Hirsh-Pasek says that using such techniques for pre-kindergartners "does not give your child a leg up on anything".

== See also ==
- Cram school
- Storefront school
