= Sculpture by the Sea =

Australian annual event

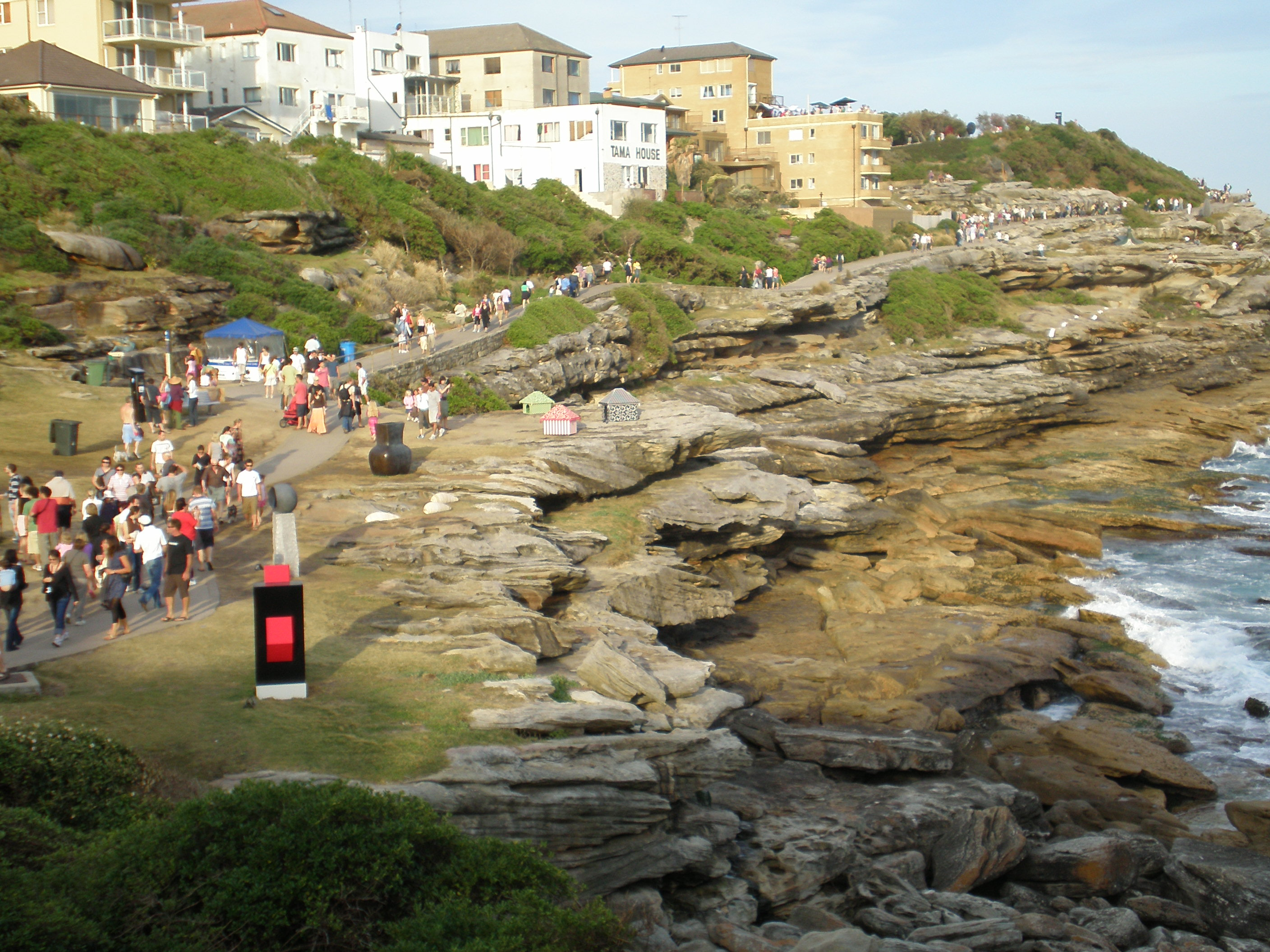
The crowds and sculptures of Sculpture by the Sea 2006

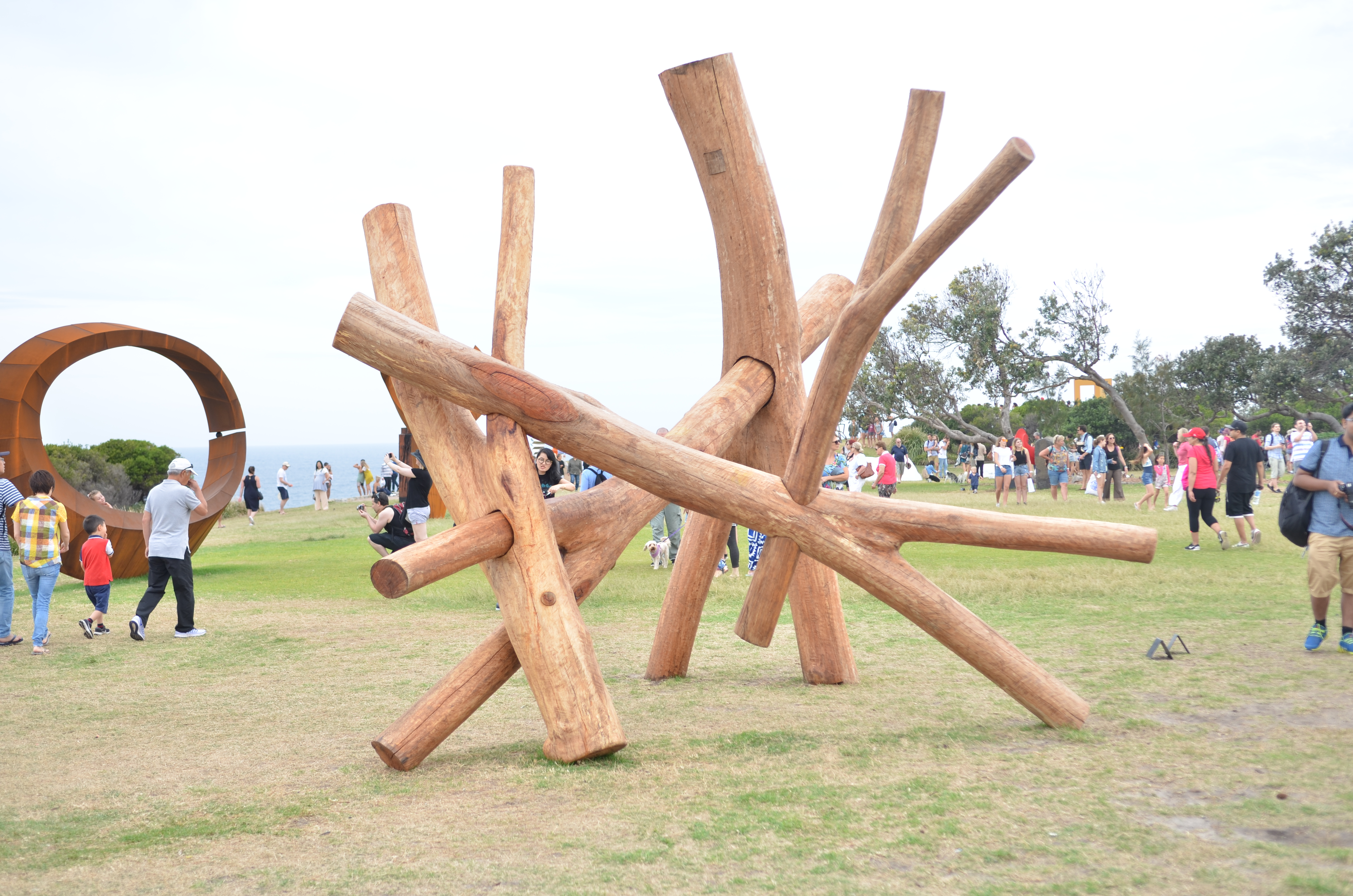
Sculpture by the Sea, Bondi Beach, Sydney 2017

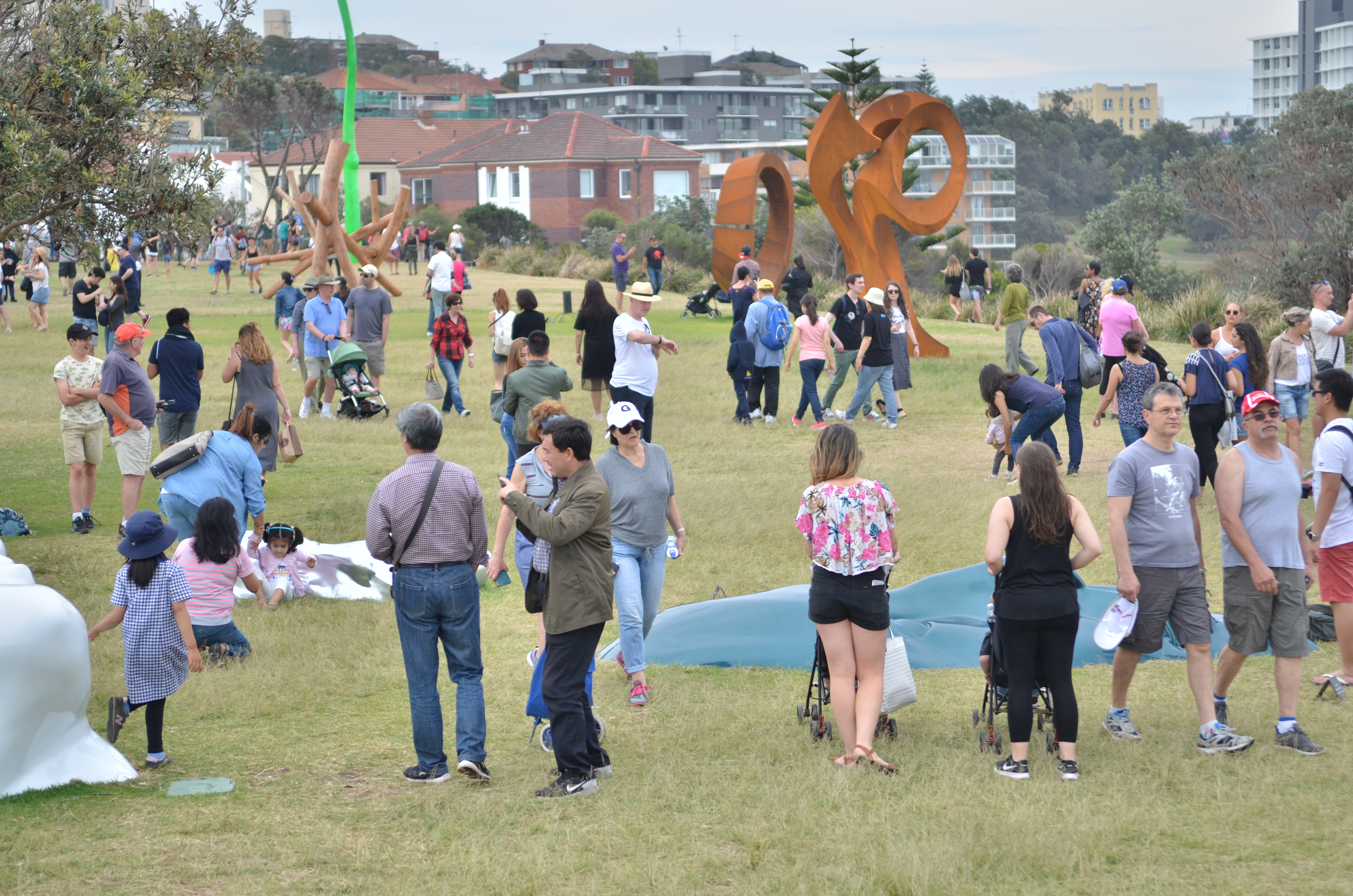
Sculpture by the Sea, Bondi, Sydney 2017

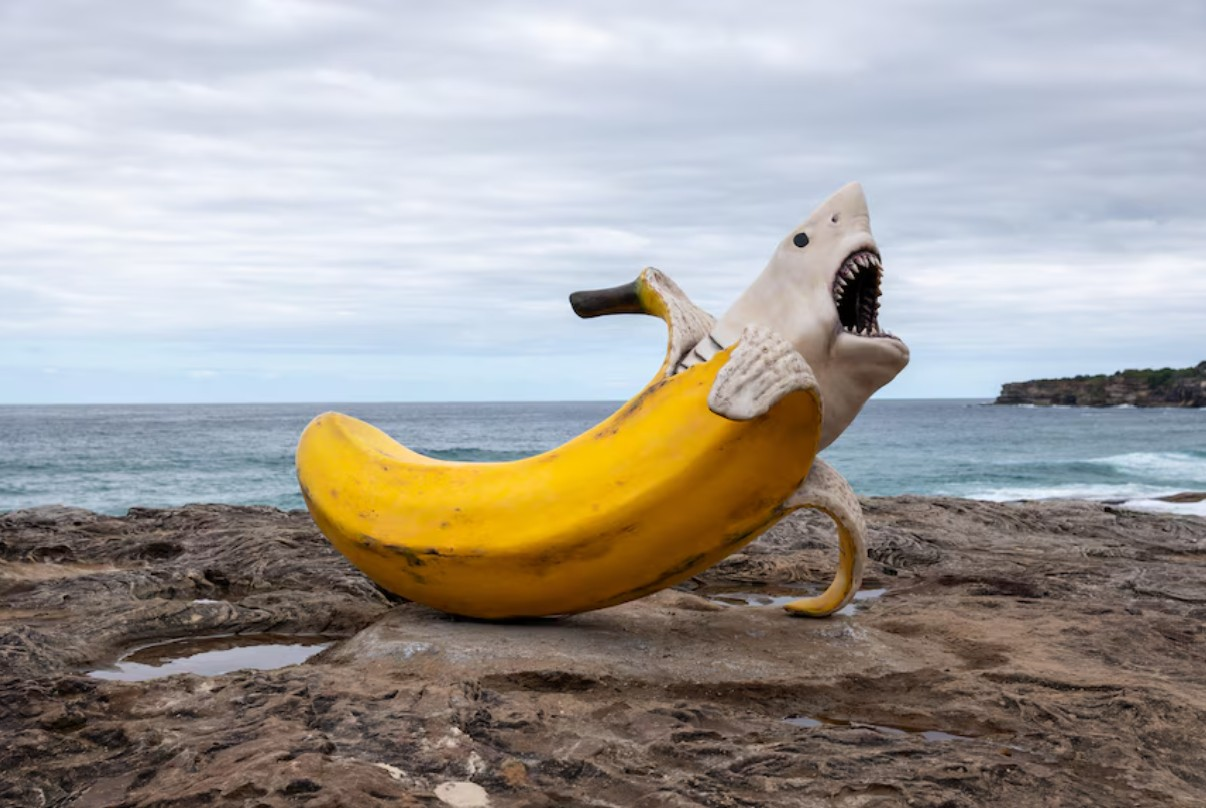
Sharnana by Drew McDonald, Bondi, 2024

The Sculpture by the Sea exhibition in Sydney and Perth is Australia's largest annual outdoor sculpture exhibition. This exhibition was initiated in 1997, at Bondi Beach and it featured sculptures by both Australian and overseas artists. In 2005, a companion event was established at Cottesloe Beach in Western Australia featuring over 70 artists. In 2009 it was announced that Aarhus in Denmark would host the first Sculpture by the Sea exhibition outside of Australia.

This exhibition is held annually during spring in Australia at Bondi Beach from late October to early November for three weeks, and Cottesloe Beach from early to mid March for three weeks. Over 100 local, interstate and international artists participate every year. Sculpture by the Sea is incredibly popular and draws considerable crowds. In 2014 Waverley Council estimated that between 450,000 and 500,000 people would visit the sculptures during their exhibition in Sydney.

== Sydney ==
=== History ===
In 1995, David Handley, founder of Sculpture by the Sea, was living in Prague. He visited an outdoor sculpture park in Klatovy, northern Bohemia. He was inspired to do something similar in Australia. On his return to Sydney in 1996, his friends suggested the Bondi to Tamarama coastal walk as a suitable location. At first, he planned on having paintings as well as sculptures, naming this exhibition "Art by the Sea" but dropped the idea as the weather can be unpredictable on the coast.

The first exhibition was put together in a span of 10 weeks and on a low budget. It was held over one day in 1997 at Bondi and garnered a lot of interest from the media and 20,000 spectators. They received a total of 189 entries from 138 artists and featured 64 of them. The judges included David Cook (Christie's), John MacDonald (Sydney Morning Herald), Terence Measham (Powerhouse Museum), Gene Sherman (Sherman Galleries) and sculptor Ron Robertson-Swann.

The exhibition has only suffered from the weather on the coast. In 1998, rough conditions on the coastline lead to six sculptures being damaged. Ann Thompson's sculpture worth $40,000 was damaged by huge waves. In 1999, Duncan Stemler's Give a little whistle was wrecked due to rough weather conditions. The exhibition also suffered from some vandalism. Carol Murphy's $2000 still life The Watcher was stolen only for one part of it to be returned. In 1999, part of Tom Bass's Gender Pieces was pushed into the sea by vandals.

The works are spread across the cliff from Bronte Beach to Bondi Beach via Tamarama Beach. Every year the coastal walk is transformed into a seaside art gallery. Over 100 sculptures are exhibited in the background of sea and the coastal landscape along the two-kilometre coastal walk. Sculpture by the Sea began in 1996 with an exhibition held over one day at Bondi and the annual event is now the world's largest free outdoor sculpture exhibition.

=== Awards ===
For the first eight years, the main prize was provided by Sydney Water, and most of the award-winning works were gifted to Campbelltown Arts Centre. In 2006 and 2007, National Australia Bank sponsored the main prize and the works made their way to Orange Regional Gallery. From 2009 to 2012, the Balnaves Foundation sponsored the main prize to the winning sculptor in the exhibition, and the works gifted to the Royal Botanic Garden. From 2013 to 2015, it was Macquarie Group and the works gifted to the Sydney Harbour Federation Trust for placement at Georges Heights.

Other scholarships and prizes have been awarded in this exhibition, including the Helen Lempriere Scholarship, the Clitheroe Foundation Emerging Sculptor Mentorship Program, and Allens People's Choice Award. There is also an encouragement award for younger artists.

==== Major prizewinners ====
- Sharnana, a recycled plastic and steel Great White Shark emerging from a banana (2024)
- Folly Interstice, a jarrah and steel pyramid by Tony Davis (2022)
- M-forty six, an abstract steel sculpture by James Parrett (2018)
- Orb, a steel piece by David Ball (2017)
- Divided Planet, by Jörg Plickat (2015)

== Perth ==
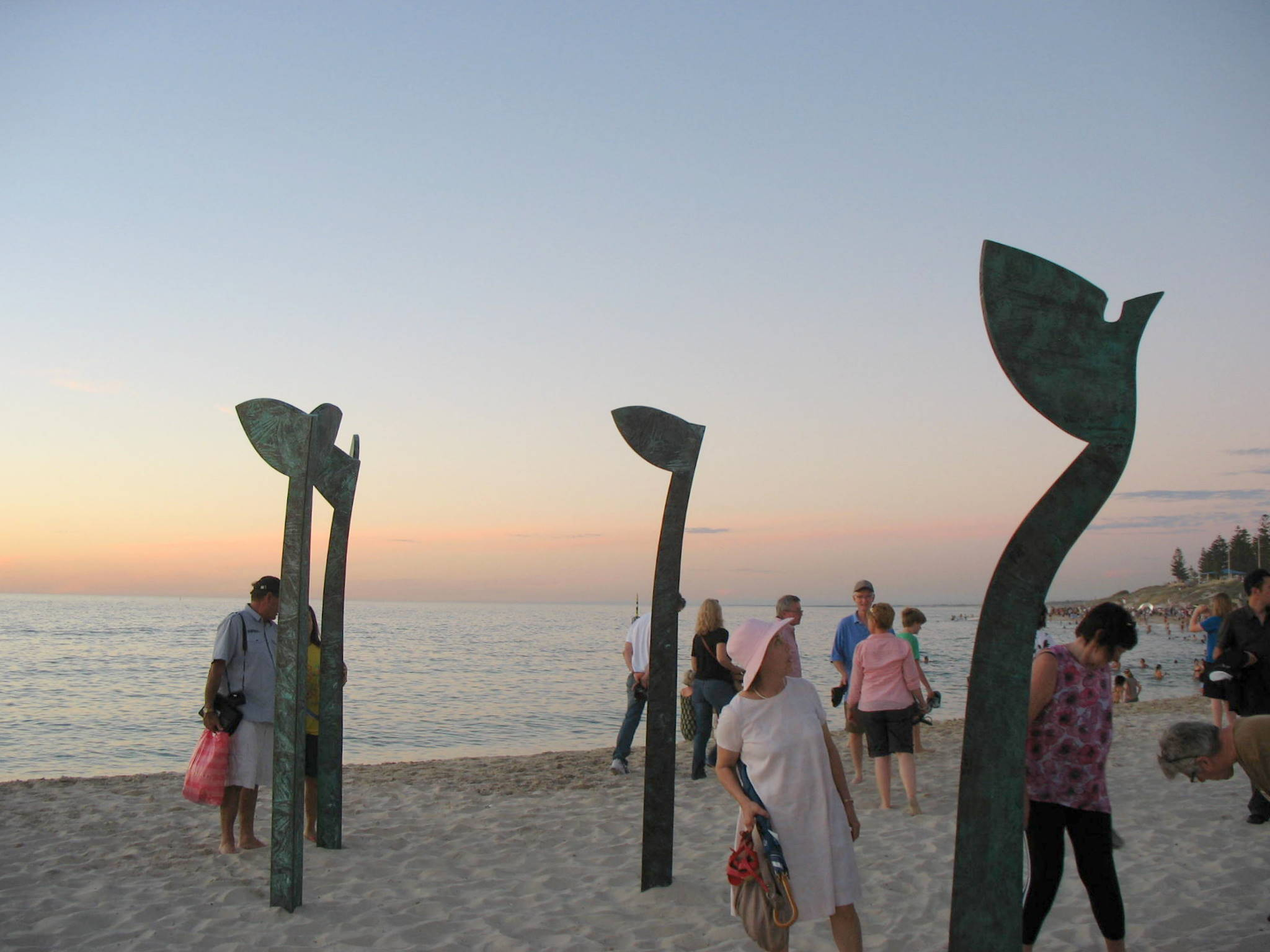
Sculptures on Cottesloe Beach (2011)

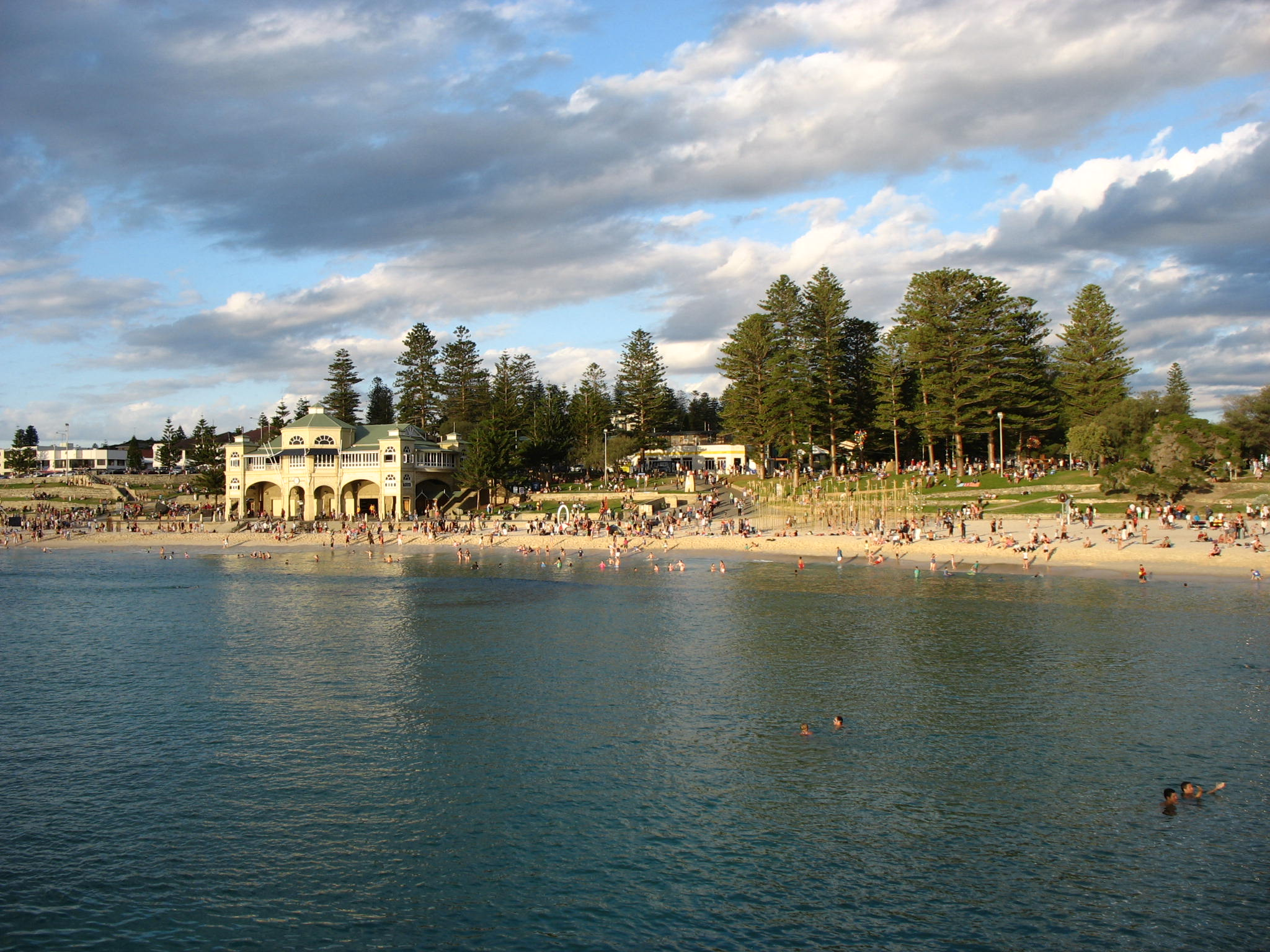
Sculpture by the Sea - Cottesloe Beach (2013)

In 2005, the first Sculpture by the Sea event was held at Cottesloe Beach, Western Australia, overlooking the Indian Ocean. The exhibition showcased sculptures by Western Australia's leading and emerging sculptors, alongside works by invited interstate and international sculptors. This free annual public exhibition attracts over 200,000 visitors of all ages.

In December 2024, organisers announced the cancellation of the 2025 exhibition, due to lack of funds.

== Denmark ==
In June 2009 Crown Princess Mary and Crown Prince Frederik of Denmark initiated a biannual Sculpture by the Sea event in the city of Aarhus (Denmark), inspired by the exhibitions in Australia, Mary's country of birth. It is the only SBTS event outside Australia. 'Sculpture by the Sea, Aarhus - Denmark' is financially and legally independent of 'Sculpture by the Sea Incorporated' and is being produced by the city of Aarhus in collaboration with ARoS Aarhus Artmuseum. The first two exhibitions attracted approximately half a million visitors. Sculpture by the Sea, Aarhus terminated with the last event in 2015.

== See also ==
- Art of Australia
- List of public art in the City of Sydney
