= Community College Research Center =

The Community College Research Center (CCRC) is an independent research center that studies two-year colleges and open-access four-year institutions in the United States. Its researchers use qualitative and quantitative methods to assess programs, policies, and reforms in areas including remedial education, academic advising, institutional effectiveness, and college transfer. CCRC is housed at Teachers College, Columbia University, and is led by Thomas W. Brock.

== History ==
CCRC launched in 1996 with a grant from the Alfred P. Sloan Foundation to provide a research foundation for the improvement of the nation’s 1,100 community colleges. Despite enrolling nearly half of all undergraduates, community colleges at the time were rarely a part of higher education research and discussion. Since its inception, CCRC has contributed to more than 460 publications and grown to a staff of over 50 people. CCRC has led three research centers funded by the Institute of Education Sciences at the U.S. Department of Education: the National Center for Postsecondary Research (2006–2012), the Center for Analysis of Postsecondary Education and Employment (2011–2017), and the Center for the Analysis of Postsecondary Readiness (2014–2019).

== Notable Research ==
- A 2010 CCRC study found that more students exit their remedial course sequences because they do not enroll in the first or later course than because they fail or withdraw from a course. The findings helped inform a period of ongoing developmental education reform and prompted many colleges to experiment with ways to shorten remedial course sequences.
- In 2012, CCRC published findings that suggested standardized placement tests, such as College Board’s ACCUPLACER and ACT’s COMPASS, lead too many students who could succeed in a college-level course to be placed in remedial courses.
- A 2013 CCRC study suggested that online courses exacerbate pre-existing achievement gaps. While all students performed worse in online courses than in face-to-face courses, the gaps were larger for some groups, including male students, students with lower grade point averages, and Black students.
- The 2015 book Redesigning America’s Community Colleges—written by former CCRC Director Thomas Bailey, CCRC Research Affiliate Shanna Smith Jaggars, and CCRC Senior Research Scholar Davis Jenkins—outlines the guided pathways model of institutional reform. The authors argue that to substantially improve student outcomes, community colleges should help students plan out a complete program of study and provide academic and nonacademic supports throughout their time in college. Guided pathways reforms have since been implemented at more than 250 colleges across the country.
