= Norman Lacy =

Australian politician (1941–2026)

The Honourable Norman Lacy
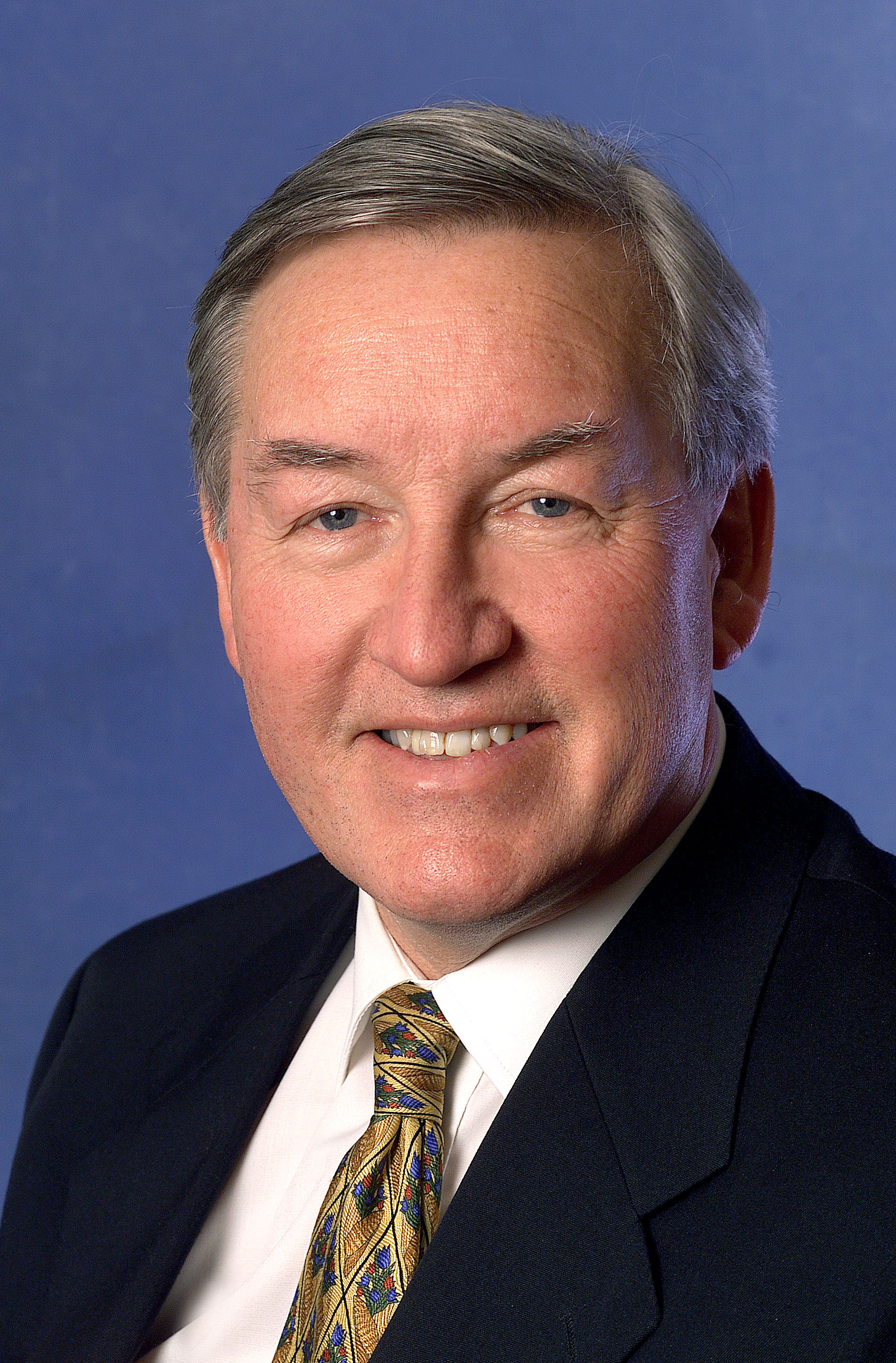
- Lacy in 2001

Member of Parliament for Warrandyte
- In office 1973–1982
- Preceded by: James Manson
- Succeeded by: Louis Hill

Minister for the Arts
- In office 1979–1982
- Preceded by: Rupert Hamer
- Succeeded by: Race Mathews

Assistant Minister of Education
- In office 1979–1980
- Preceded by: Alan Scanlon

Minister for Educational Services
- In office 1980–1982
- Succeeded by: Robert Fordham

Personal details
- Born: 25 October 1941 Richmond, Victoria, Australia
- Died: 2 May 2026 (aged 84)
- Party: Liberal Party
- Education: Durham University

Norman Henry Lacy (25 October 1941 – 2 May 2026) was an Australian politician, who was a minister in the Hamer and Thompson Cabinets of the Victorian Government from May 1979 to April 1982.

Lacy grew up in Richmond, Victoria and was educated at North Richmond Primary School (1946–1953) and Richmond Technical School (1954–1956). He completed university degrees in theology (Th.Schol., Australian University of Theology) 1969, sociology (B.A. Hons, Monash University) 1975 and management science (M.Sc., Durham University, UK) 1984 and had a diverse career that included periods as an apprenticed plumber, an Anglican priest, a Liberal parliamentarian, a management educator and an information technology industry executive. He was President of Self Employed Australia (formerly Independent Contractors Australia) from 2008 until 2018.

As Minister for the Arts from 1979 to 1982, Norman Lacy was responsible for the construction of the Victorian Arts Centre and the design of its management structure, the establishment of the Australian Children's Television Foundation and the Heide Museum of Modern Art, the creation of Film Victoria, and the reconstitution of the Victorian College of the Arts. As Assistant Minister of Education and Minister for Educational Services from 1979 to 1982, he was responsible for reforming and decentralising the administration of the Education Department of Victoria, for establishing the Special Assistance Program to deal with illiteracy and innumeracy, by training and appointing an additional 1,000 Special Assistance Resource Teachers to primary schools, for introducing a reformed Health and Human Relations Education curriculum, and for compulsory physical education in government schools.

As a management educator from 1985 to 1994, Lacy brought the internationally renowned Leadership Development Program from the Center for Creative Leadership in North Carolina, to Australia. From 1988, at the Australian Management College, Mt Eliza, he delivered the 6-day program to approximately 900 Australian managers. From 1991 to 1994 he was executive director of the China-Australia Management Centre that was established as an Australian Government aid project near Beijing, China with the China National Non-Ferrous Metals Industry Corporation (CNNC). During Lacy's tenure, 1,500 Chinese managers from more than 300 plants throughout China were trained in western management theory and practice.

He completed his career, in the period from 1994 to 2009, with three executive appointments in the information technology industry. He was Professional Development Director of the Australian Computer Society (1996–1998); founding Managing Director of The Swish Group Limited (1998–2000); and founding Executive Director of ITCRA (Information Technology Contract & Recruitment Association) (2000–2009).

== Victorian basketballer ==
Lacy's mother died of lung cancer at the age of 44 on 21 February 1956, when he was 14 years of age. Lacy regarded this event as the most formative of his life.

He dealt with his grief by throwing himself into sport. He played for his local church basketball team in the Church of England Basketball Association competition and devoted all his spare time to the sport. He went on to represent Victoria three times at the Australian Junior (national under age) Basketball Championships - as captain in the Under 16 Championship in Adelaide (1956); as Vice-Captain in the under 18 Championship in Sydney (1957); and as Vice-Captain also in the under 18 Championship in Davenport, Tasmania (1958) in which year, he also won the Best and Fairest Player award.

Soon after the death of his father in May 1960, Lacy was accepted by Dr Stuart Babbage, Principal of Ridley College (University of Melbourne), to live in at the college in Parkville, Victoria, while he studied for his Leaving Certificate, the minimum requirement for the commencement of theological studies, through the George Taylor and Staff correspondence school, in The Causeway off Little Collins Street in Melbourne. After completing that prerequisite in December 1961, he studied theology at Ridley College from 1962 to 1964. In December 1963, he completed his Licentiate in Theology (Th L), the minimum requirement for ordination in the Anglican Church, through the Australian University of Theology. Being too young to be ordained, he spent another year at Ridley, commencing post graduate studies.

Lacy was ordained Deacon on St Andrew's Day, 30 November 1964, and Priest on the same day in 1965, at St Paul's Cathedral, Melbourne, by Frank Woods, the Anglican Archbishop of Melbourne.

In August 1965, Norman Lacy married his first wife, with whom he had three daughters (in October 1968, in November 1970 and in May 1976).

From 1964 to 1966, he served as Curate in the parishes St Mary's Caulfield and, from 1966 to 1968, at St Stephen's Richmond. He was Vicar of St John's Healesville with Yarra Glen and Christmas Hills from 1968 to 1973. Lacy's interest in education policy was fostered in Healesville through the relationship he established with the parents and teaching staff at Healesville High School. He devoted two days each week teaching religious education to each class at the school, becoming, in effect, its honorary chaplain. He added to that integration into the school's life by becoming a member of the school's Parents and Friends Association, and was its honorary secretary for some time.

Early in his incumbency at Healesville, Lacy joined the Liberal Party under the influence, and with the support of, some prominent Liberal parliamentarians who were amongst his parishioners, including Peter Howson, Vasey Houghton, Russell Stokes and Gracia Baylor. Other Liberals, such as Vernon Hauser and Jim Manson, were active in ensuring that he secured the party's pre-selection for the seat of Ringwood in the Victorian Parliament for the 1973 Victorian state election.

== Liberal Parliamentarian ==
Lacy was a member of the Liberal Party from 1972 until 1984. He was Member for the electoral district of Ringwood in the Legislative Assembly of the Parliament of Victoria from May 1973 until February 1976, and for Warrandyte from March 1976 until April 1982. He was Secretary of the Parliamentary Liberal Party from 1976 to 1979. He was defeated at the state election that saw the demise of the Thompson Liberal Government and the election of the Cain Labor Government.

Lacy was on the Victorian Parliament's Qualifications Committee in 1973 and 1974. It was on this committee that Lacy got to work with the Opposition Leader Clyde Holding, who often reminded Lacy that for a building trade apprentice from Richmond (the electorate Holding represented) he was in the wrong party. Lacy returned the banter in numerous parliamentary debates in which he took on Holding and his party over the growing level of unemployment that was emerging in the Australian economy under the federal Whitlam government.

From the time that he joined the party in 1972, Lacy was an active and vocal "small l" Liberal and a strong supporter of the leadership of Rupert Hamer. In particular, he was active in his support for Hamer's private member's bill for the abolition of capital punishment in Victoria. Lacy made what many regarded as the finest parliamentary speech of his career on the bill, in which he made much use of his theological training. As a result, he made a number of friends amongst the Labor opposition, including fellow Anglican and Education spokesman Robert Fordham, as well as Barry Jones, who for many years had led the abolitionist campaign on this issue. He also became the unofficial "numbers man" on the Government side of the Legislative Assembly where support for the bill was hard to come by. In that he was assisted by his close friend Peter Block, who undertook a similar role in the Victorian Legislative Council where he was a member for Boronia Province, which included Lacy's lower house seat.

1976 was one of the most fulfilling years in Lacy's life. After his re-election to the parliament for the seat of Warrandyte in March 1976, he was elected by the party room to the position of Secretary of the Parliamentary Liberal Party. During his first parliamentary term, he had completed his Bachelor of Arts (Hons) in Sociology part-time at Monash University. His honors dissertation was entitled "A Social Network Approach to the Origination and Quality of Male Neighbor Relationships on Middle Class Housing Estates." He graduated in 1976 and his third daughter was born the same year.

Soon after the 1976 election, Lacy was appointed Chairman of the Parliamentary Party Committee on Social Welfare by the new Minister for Social Welfare Brian Dixon. Lacy was a strong supporter of the politically moderate former Australian rules footballer and Melbourne champion. He admired the career sacrificing position Dixon had adopted on the hanging of Ronald Ryan, his thorough knowledge of economics, his parliamentary debating skills and the value of his many enlightened and reformist policies - particularly the Life Be In It campaign. He long held the view that Dixon was the best prospect the Liberal Party had for a future leader. He thought it incompetent that the Party hadn't arranged for Dixon to be pre-selected for a safe seat and as a result he was defeated along with Bill Borthwick, Glynn Jenkins, Lacy and many others in the 1982 change of government. He believed that the long term consequence of this was that the Party had not prepared for a future in the highly successful Hamer mold and thereafter lacked any capacity for enlightened leadership and progressive policy development. Lacy resigned from the Liberal Party soon after the appointment of Jeff Kennett as Leader of the Liberal Opposition in 1982. He regarded Kennett as being in the Bolte mold, erratic, untrustworthy and lacking policy substance.

Recognising Lacy's interest in and commitment to education issues, Deputy Premier and Education Minister Lindsay Thompson invited Lacy to Chair his Parliamentary Party Committee on Education. This brought the two men closer together and Thompson performed a generous mentoring role with the young parliamentarian. It was a relationship over which Lacy agonized a few years later due to the criticism of Thompson that was implied from the substantial reforms in the administration of education in Victoria that Lacy was convinced he must pursue while in Cabinet. He became increasingly convinced and vocal that the government must restructure the administration of primary and secondary education in Victoria to a devolved school management system which empowered school communities, councils and principals who would obtain specialist support services from regional directorates. He tried, largely without success, to convince Thompson to have his ideas for educational reform, incorporated into the 1979 election policy, but otherwise he remained a great admirer of his mentor.

Lacy was prominent in defending Hamer's integrity and reputation in the Parliament against the attacks of the two renegade right wing Liberal MLAs, Charles Francis (Caulfield) and Doug Jennings (Westernport) and in September 1977 he successfully moved in the party room for their expulsion. He attacked the two members for their disloyalty to the Premier and their party colleagues by abstaining in a vote on an opposition no-confidence motion over Housing Commission of Victoria land deals. He argued that for an elected representative to abstain from voting was an abrogation of their principal responsibility upon which parliamentary democracy was based. He believed that MPs were primarily paid to vote, the record of which was democratically critical information for voters at subsequent elections. To abstain was a cowardly and devious means of keeping the electorate uninformed. His speech brought together the key tenets of his political and personal philosophy about which he was passionate - loyalty, transparency and accountability. He was strongly supported by the Speaker of the Legislative Assembly Sir Kenneth Wheeler and Community Welfare Services Minister Walter Jona.

Lacy represented the Victorian Parliament as a member of the Victorian Institute of Secondary Education Council from 1977 to 1979. In 1977 he attended the 8-week Advanced Management Program at the Australian Administrative Staff College Mount Eliza on a scholarship he was awarded by the Parliament of Victoria. It was here that Lacy conceived and developed the general thrust of the decentralized regional and school based reforms that, with Education Minister Alan Hunt, he later introduced into the Victorian education system.

== Minister for the Arts (1979–1982) ==
Norman Lacy's loyalty towards, and open support for, his leader, Premier Rupert Hamer was rewarded after the 1979 election by the Premier personally selecting him for his new Cabinet and giving him the Ministry for the Arts which until then had been held by Hamer. He was also made Assistant Minister of Education in support of another strong Hamer supporter, fellow small "l" liberal, Alan Hunt, who was appointed Minister of Education by Hamer after the 1979 election.

Lacy held the portfolio of Minister for the Arts from May 1979 to April 1982. During his Arts incumbency, he was responsible for the establishment of the Victorian Arts Centre Trust and for the construction of the theatres, concert hall and spire of the Victorian Arts Centre.

During this period, Lacy's friendship with Peter Block was a most valuable resource. Block was a constant source of advice on many of the difficult issues that emerged in the critical construction phase of this major national project. Lacy was constantly called on to defend the Arts Centre Trust during some highly charged public debates in the Parliament. He had to defend the acoustics, the design of the spire, the rejection of the proposed changes to the Concert Hall interiors, the BASS ticketing system of the project, as well as its delays and cost over runs, in debates that were often led by Opposition Leader John Cain.

In May 1980, prior to introducing the legislation to establish the management structure of the Victorian Arts Centre, he undertook a study trip with George Fairfax, the centre's Executive Director to Los Angeles, San Francisco, New York, Washington, Toronto, Ottawa, London and Paris to assess administrative structures at major performing arts centres in these cities. However, Lacy's relationship with Fairfax deteriorated soon afterwards when he had to inform Fairfax that he could not support the additional cost and waste that would be involved in shelving the already acquired Concert Hall interior fittings and finishes in favour of new designs that the Trust had commissioned by John Truscott and was then actively promoting. Being responsible for both the generously funded Arts, and the over stretched Education, building programs created a moral tension for Lacy. Nor was he impressed with the Trust going over his head to directly lobby the Treasurer for the extra multimillion-dollar funding required for the proposed new interiors. In the end, he won the argument with his long standing mentor and friend, Treasurer Lindsay Thompson and the Truscott designs were dropped.

In March 1981, Lacy had the Victorian College of the Arts Act passed through the Victorian Parliament. Its purpose was the reconstitution of the Victorian College of the Arts (VCA) made necessary by the repeal in 1980 of the Victorian Institute of Colleges Act and to make it "better able to provide for the preparation of young people to enter upon careers as professional artists. It also represents a most significant development for the Victorian Arts Centre."

In October 1981, Lacy created Film Victoria as "a new statutory authority to be responsible for Government activities related to the production and distribution of film in Victoria including film for educational purposes." The Act that he had passed through the Victorian Parliament provided for Film Victoria to be established by the amalgamation the Victorian Film Corporation (as it had been constituted initially in 1976), the State Film Centre and sections of the Audio Visual Resources Branch of the Education Department of Victoria. The purpose of the amalgamation was to avoid the unnecessary duplication of functions by the three organisations; to enhance the capacity of the Government to meet the present and future media needs of Victorians; to simplify access to film materials and to enlarge the benefits to be derived from the use of such materials. Lacy saw this initiative as supportive and complementary to his push to have the Australian Children's Television Foundation established.

Other highlights of this period were:

- The acquisition of the property Heide II (in Bulleen east of Melbourne) and a collection of 113 art works from John and Sunday Reed in August 1980. Lacy's on-going support for this project saw the creation of a public art gallery, originally named Heide Park and Art Gallery, (but since 2006 as Heide Museum of Modern Art) which was officially opened in November 1981.
- The development of a museum policy for Victoria and of a submission for a Museum of Social and Political History at the Old Treasury Building to the executive committee of Victoria's 150th Anniversary Celebrations in July 1981.
- The development, funding and opening of the Meatmarket Craft Centre in North Melbourne.
- The provision of funding for, and the opening on 8 December 1981, of the National Book Council of Australia's Book House in Carlton, Victoria.

== Assistant Minister of Education / Minister for Educational Services (1979–1982) ==
Norman Lacy held the portfolios Assistant Minister of Education from May 1979 to December 1980, and Minister for Educational Services from December 1980 to April 1982.

Together, Lacy (in the Legislative Assembly) and Education Minister Alan Hunt (in the Legislative Council) worked together to reform the administration of the highly centralised Department of Education in Victoria. As Assistant Minister of Education and later, Minister for Educational Services, Lacy was jointly responsible with Hunt for the most significant reorganisation of the Education Department of Victoria in the 20th Century.

Hunt appointed Lacy Chairman of the external Ministerial Consultative Committee that steered the project in its early phase and the Implementation Steering Committee later. Lacy pulled together an impressive group of people from academia and business to assist him including emeritus Professor Bill Walker from the University of New England who became a significant influence in Lacy's career after politics. At the end of 1981, the Government legislated to scrap the teaching divisions of the Education Department (Primary, Secondary and Technical) and to abolish the statutory bodies - the Committee of Classifiers and the Teachers' Tribunal. The reforms included the decentralisation of the administration of the Education Department to regional centres of the state and to primary and secondary school councils. For the first time parents represented on school councils had a role in the selection of their school's principal.

Lacy's role in the Education portfolios included responsibility for the Special Services, the Building Operations and the Planning Services Divisions. He used this responsibility to initiate compulsory Physical Education in Schools. For this, he was recognised in March 1983 by the award of a Fellowship by the Australian Council for Health, Physical Education and Recreation. Similarly, Lacy was responsible for the promotion of a reformed Health and Human Relations Education curriculum in Victorian Schools. He had been personally given this project by the Premier on being appointed to Cabinet after the 1979 election to fulfil a commitment Hamer had made prior to the election to the Women's Electoral Lobby. He pursued this mandate assiduously and against robust public opposition from rural based fundamentalist Christian groups as well as leading members of the Catholic Church and the National Civic Council. With the Premier's support he had the Principles and Policy Statements for Health and Human Relations Education approved by Cabinet on 15 October 1979 and the "Guidelines" and "Curriculum Statement" on 8 December 1981.

Lacy used his ministerial membership of the Australian Education Council and the Australian Arts Ministers' Conference to initiate the establishment of the Australian Children's Television Foundation. He appointed Dr. Patricia Edgar to the Arts Ministry staff to steer the project, provided office space and establishment funding, and won the support of NSW Education Minister Paul Landa with whom he co-chaired the early steering committee meetings. In 1981, Lacy addressed the Senate Standing Committee on Education and the Arts arguing for the strategic and national importance of a Commonwealth commitment to recurrent funding for the fledgling Foundation. Lacy's political advocacy and practical support coupled with Edgar's intellectual capacity and lobbying skills eventually won through and the Australian Children's Television Foundation was born with funding support from the Commonwealth Government collectively matched by all the State governments except Queensland. The Foundation has continued to flourish into the 21st century under the dual leadership of Edgar as executive director and its long term chairman and patron Janet Holmes à Court.

His work in the planning, budgeting and delivery of the school building program gave the ex-plumber some of his most satisfying experiences. He accepted every invitation he received to visit schools in Victoria. Usually, the purpose of the visit was to open a new school, library, art and craft centre or physical education facility. The latter being the subject of a carefully thought out plan - the Education & Community Activity Centre (Ecacentre) program which expended the funds available for school assembly halls on a greater number of secondary schools for the purpose of providing a facility for indoor physical education and sport. He became enthusiastic about this program for many reasons not the least of which was that the design developed at his request by the Public Works Department was able to accommodate a regulation sized basketball court. He regarded this as his contribution to the growth of the sport that had given him so much structure and distraction during his teenage years. More than 200 secondary schools benefited from the program that also provided the structural resources needed throughout the state to accommodate his compulsory physical education policy. Returning to Healesville High School in 1981 to officially open such a facility was one of the last highlights of Lacy's Ministerial career.

The most significant achievement of Lacy's short time in government was his establishment of the Special Assistance Program in Victorian Primary Schools. He outlined his ambitious program in a speech he made at a seminar of Special Assistance Resource Teachers in December 1980. In it he announced the most significant development in remedial education in Victoria with a strategic plan for addressing a reported decline in literacy and numeracy skills amongst secondary students. The totally new component of the Special Assistance Program was the provision of 1000 Special Assistance Resource Teachers "in the delivery of services to children with special needs." They were given "a major on-site responsibility facilitating a productive relationship between parents and pupils and teachers." The program involved the training of these primary teachers as Special Assistance Resource Teachers and their placement in schools. Their role was the early detection and remediation of children at risk of illiteracy and innumeracy. Lacy's greatest political disappointment came from the Cain Labor Government's actions after their 1982 election, directed at de-emphasising and largely dismantling the program.

Lacy had a central role in the appointment of two departmental permanent heads in the Victorian public service during his Cabinet career. In 1980, he secured cabinet support for the appointment of Paul Clarkson, a former CRA executive, as Director of the Ministry for the Arts after the retirement of Dr Eric Westbrook the founding Director. Then in 1981, with Alan Hunt, he secured the replacement of Dr Laurie Shears as Director General of the newly restructured Education Department of Victoria by Toorak State College Principal Revd Dr Norman Curry.

During 1981, in the lead up to the 1982 election, Lacy worked assiduously on policy development. He developed policies on a number of issues within his portfolios. Almost every week during the spring session of Parliament in that year he delivered a ministerial statement in the Legislative Assembly on one of these policies in an attempt to counter the emerging mood for change in the electorate. With a solid margin, he had no expectation that he would lose his seat, but he was becoming increasingly convinced that the Government could not survive. Three disparate forces combined on election day in April 1982 to end his parliamentary career. Each of them related to a statewide issue upon which he had publicly adopted a strong position. Smarting from the provision of a promised additional 1,000 teachers to the Special Assistance Program rather than to the reduction of student teacher ratios in classrooms, the Victorian Teachers Union vigorously targeted him. Right wing Christian groups (including the rural based Concerned Parents Association who ran a candidate against him) and the DLP (with the direction of their preferences against him — the first Liberal to be so treated) targeted him over his Health and Human Relations Education program.

== Management Educator (1982–1994) ==
Norman Lacy was separated from his first wife in January 1982 and was divorced in 1983. Being removed from his young family and then losing his seat in Parliament in April 1982 presented Lacy with the darkest period of his life since the death of his mother in 1956. Living alone in The Avenue, Parkville in the neighbourhood of Ridley College where 20 years earlier he had commenced his theological studies, he wrestled with his loneliness and the loss of his family and career. It represented a personal crisis of identity, significance and purpose for which he had little support.

After parliament, Lacy developed a career in management education and consulting. At this time, he was greatly influenced by his reading on technological change in particular Barry Jones book Sleepers, Wake!. In September 1982, he joined the Management Consulting Services division of Deloitte, Haskins and Sells, one of the 'big five' chartered accounting firms. Soon afterwards, in April 1983 he bought a home in Camberwell, Victoria and moved in.

In October 1983, with the support of the firm, he took leave to study full-time at Durham Business School at Durham University in the north east of the United Kingdom. While at Durham, he was elected by his fellow students to the Board of Studies of the School. He used the position to encourage the School to establish the first information technology course for M.Sc. (Management) students. His masters dissertation was on "the perceptions of information technology professionals, their understanding of managerial decision-making and the role of the decision support system designer". He graduated with a Master of Science (M.Sc.Management) in 1984. After returning to Australia from Durham, Lacy was appointed Manager, Corporate Communications at the new joint venture IBIS DH&S Australia.

In June 1985, Lacy married his second wife with whom he had a son in 1998.

Soon afterwards, at the invitation of Professor Bill Walker, Lacy was appointed a Member of the Directing Staff (1985–91), and subsequently Director, International Programs (1988–91), at the Australian Management College, Mount Eliza. During the 1st 3 years of this period, he and his wife lived at 26 Bambra Street, Mount Eliza after which they moved back to their home in Camberwell.

In 1988, the college invited him to attend the internationally renowned Leadership Development Program at the Center for Creative Leadership at Greensboro, North Carolina, USA to assess the program and to be trained there to deliver it under license in Australia. During the following 3 years Lacy delivered the 6-day program at Mount Eliza on more than 34 occasions to approximately 900 Australian middle and senior level managers. He regarded this period as the most satisfying of his career.

In 1990, the college appointed him to lead a team of 20 staff as executive director of the China-Australia Management Centre that was established near Beijing, China. The establishment of the centre was an Australian Government aid project in association with the Australian Management College, ACIL Australia and the China National Non-Ferrous Metals Industry Corporation (CNNC). During Lacy's tenure, the centre (based at a CNNC university at Yan Jao), where he and his wife lived from 1991 to 1994, trained 1,500 Chinese senior and middle-level managers from more than 300 mines, processing plants and manufacturing plants throughout China. The Centre — whose mission was to train CNNC managers in western management theory and practice — was one of two that had been promised to the Chinese Premier Zhao Ziyang by Australian Prime Minister Bob Hawke on a visit to China in 1983. The other, in the iron and steel industry, was located at Wuhan.

== IT Industry Executive (1994–2009) ==
After returning to Melbourne in 1994, Lacy became Professional Development Director of the Australian Computer Society from 1996 to 1998. This position involved the strategic development and management of the society's CMACS certification program into an industry based, masters level, distance education program for the certification of senior information technology professionals. He achieved this by establishing alliances with Open Learning Australia, a consortium of Australian Universities; the Association of Professional Engineers, Scientists and Managers, Australia (APESMA) and Deakin Australia.

From 1998 to 2000, he was managing director, of The Swish Group Limited. The position involved the establishment of the company during 1998, firstly as a consultant, and then from December 1998 as managing director. The Swish Group was one of the early Internet service providers in Australia, focusing on website, touch screen kiosk and CD-ROM design, e-commerce solutions and hosting. His achievements in this position included the formation and integration of the company by the acquisition and merging of three companies, and its Initial Public Offer and successful listing on the ASX. In July 1999, he accepted the invitation to represent small business in the ICT industry on the Australia Israel Chamber of Commerce IT&T Trade Mission to Israel, led by the Minister for Communications IT and the Arts, Richard Alston.

From 2000 to 2009, Lacy was the founding executive director of the Information Technology Contract & Recruitment Association. This role required the establishment of the Association, the development of its products and services and the ongoing management of its membership and revenue growth. During this period, ITCRA's membership grew from 6 to more than 150 companies across Australia and New Zealand. Lacy's other achievements in this position included the establishment of a national research project at the invitation of the Department of Communications, IT and the Arts in May 2006. SkillsMatch ICT Labour Market Analysis is an on-line consolidated national database that addresses the need for labour market participants to gain an informed understanding of the ICT skills market and future skills demand. With Tower Life Australia in April 2001, he established the IT Super superannuation fund. The establishment and growth of IT2 as the second most successful IT job board, in partnership with SEEK (2002–2005) and with Fairfax Digital (from 2005) was a significant achievement. As was the design, establishment and growth of the ITCRA Certified Recruitment Professional program.

Having become an independent contractor in 1991, in early 2000, Norman Lacy joined the Board of Self Employed Australia (formerly Independent Contractors Australia). He was president from October 2008 until October 2018 when he retired. In recognition of his service to the founding of the organisation and to the advancement of self-employed Australians, he was appointed its first life member. During his tenure on the Board, he worked on SEA's policy development and lobbying campaigns that have focused on:

- The introduction of the Personal Services Income (Tax) Act (2000–2001);
- The declaration by the International Labour Organisation accepting the legitimacy of self-employed people (2006);
- The introduction of the Independent Contractors' Act (2006);
- The extension of the provision of Small Business Ombudsmen to SA, WA and NSW, following Victoria's example;
- The passage in October 2015 of the Small Business and Unfair Contract Terms Act that extends consumer unfair contract term protections to small businesses. This was the result of a 6-year campaign that involved the development and promotion of the Charter of Contractual Fairness to governments and corporations and to have the Trade Practices Act amended to extend the protections for contractual fairness, available to consumers, to small businesses (2009–15);
- The establishment of the Small Business Tax Tribunal (November 2018).

== Retirement and death ==
Lacy retired from his full time career and public life in 2009 and lived in Wye River, Victoria. He died on 2 May 2026, at the age of 84.

== Sources ==
- Andrew Spaull, A History of the Australian Education Council 1936-1986, Allen & Unwin, 1987;
- Conversations with the subject from 23 August 2008 - 5 September 2011;
- G Browne, Biographical Register of the Victorian Parliament 1900-84, 1985;
- Addressing Declining Literacy and Numeracy Skills in Victorian Primary Schools, The Internet Archive, 13 July 2012;
- M Frazer, J Dunstan, P Creed Eds., "Implementing Change" in Perspectives on Organisational Change, Longmans, 1985;
- Norman Lacy, "Community Education - Another Perspective" in Community, Participation and Learning, J. Bremmer, I. Bennett, D. Kiers, J. Liard, Eds., AACE, 1980;
- Notable Australians, Melbourne, 1978;
- Pamela Bone, Up We Grew: Stories of Australian Childhoods, Melbourne University Press, 2006;
- Parliament of Victoria Registary, February 2008;
- Patricia Edgar, Bloodbath: A Memoir of Australian Television, Melbourne University Press, 2006;
- The Age, 17 May 1979, 5 April 1982;
- The Herald, 16 October 1982;
- Vicki Fairfax, The Place Across the River: The Story of the Building of the Victorian Arts Centre, Macmillan, 2001;
- Victorian Parliamentary Handbook;
- Walter Jona, People, Parliament and Politics, Tertiary Press, 2006;
- Who's Who in Australia 1974–1980;
