= Bob Jenyns =

Australian artist

- Born: Robert Jenyns; 1944; Melbourne, Australia
- Died: 6 November 2015 (aged 70–71)
- Education: Caulfield Institute of Technology
- Known for: Sculpture, Printmaking, Drawing, Painting
- Awards: 2007 Helen Lempriere National Sculpture Award

Bob Jenyns (born Robert Jenyns, 1944, Victoria – died 16 November 2015) was a prolific Australian artist whose practice, spanning over four decades, produced countless sculptures, prints, drawings, and paintings. He participated in many of Australia's most significant art exhibitions including the first Biennale of Sydney (1973), the 1973, 1975 and 1978 Mildura Sculpture Triennials, the 1981 Australian Perspecta, the 2nd Australian Sculpture Biennale, and the 1990 Sculpture Triennial. Jenyns was a finalist in the 2006 Helen Lempriere National Sculpture Award, and in 2007 won the award with his work Pont de l'archeveche. He is represented in many of the country's largest collections, including the National Gallery of Australia, the Art Gallery of New South Wales, the Queensland Art Gallery, the Museum of Contemporary Art in Brisbane, and the Tasmanian Museum and Art Gallery. Jenyns also received multiple grants from the Australia Council's Visual Arts Board, curated exhibitions and taught at the Tasmanian School of Art as head of the sculpture department (1982–2005).

Bob Jenyns was married to ceramic artist Lorraine Jenyns. They lived and worked in Tasmania, Australia. He died on 6 November 2015.

== Style ==
Jenyns' work is distinctive in style, which has remained relatively consistent throughout his lengthy artistic career. His art is identifiable by his persistent use of figuration, his use of a naive or Outsider Aesthetic, distinct sense of humour, a handcrafted aesthetic, the tableaux or narrative as artistic strategies, the celebration of the everyday and the frequent reference to political, cultural and social events as well as personal experience.

== A Naive Aesthetic ==
Of the few critics that have written on Jenyns, most refer to the 'naive' or Outsider Aesthetic evident in his work. James Gleeson in 1973, for instance, labelled Jenyns as 'pop-naive'; and Bernice Murphy believes that Jenyns' approach to form 'is allied to tribal art or direct vernacular forms in popular culture, rather than to the formal tradition of Western sculpture.' Graeme Sturgeon believes that this aesthetic 'suggests that Jenyns is a naive artist viewing everything with an apparently wide-eyed innocence.' However, all agree that this exterior is deceptive, with Sturgeon adding that 'one suspects, that behind the apparently ingenuous exterior… there lies another, more profound reality, which will be well worth discovering.' Under Jenyns' profile in Australian Sculptors, Ken Scarlett acknowledges that

His work certainly has the appearance of naivety, but it also contains a sophisticated wit … Is the sculptor really naive? Is he pulling the spectator's leg? Is he making fun of art and the whole gallery scene?

Jenyns' enthusiastic embrace of the Outsider Aesthetic appears to stem from a number of different experiences and sources. Firstly, his childhood experience of making toys out of salvaged materials has subsequently affected his treatment of materials and form later in his professional artistic career. Secondly, Jenyns has long held an interest in Folk, Naive and outsider art, which has also clearly influenced his style. Lastly, his use of the Outsider Aesthetic serves as a strategy in order to express his disapproval of certain aspects of the art establishment. For Jenyns, the Outsider Aesthetic is symbolic of individual expression, and is a way of challenging dictated notions of taste and high art.

== Humour ==
In Jenyns' art, humour exists in a number of different forms. His titles often include puns (such as Putting Money Where Your Mouse Is (1967)), and his subjects are parodied (for example Humble Hero (c. 1984)), although generally in a good-humoured manner. His clever observations of social, political and cultural structures, and celebration of everyday objects and events, are humorously captured in his work, and the many works which celebrate these easily forgotten moments of life are amusing simply due to their banality (Dog (1993)). Satire is mostly used by Jenyns in a subtle manner, emerging in quietly subversive works that hide behind a naive exterior; however, occasionally Jenyns produces blatantly critical works which use ironic humour to air political or cultural disapproval (Meanwhile... Down South in Tasmania (2005)). Additionally, his novel use of materials and techniques to produce works of art regularly undermine traditional notions of high and low art.

== Representation ==
Jenyns was represented by Watters Gallery in Sydney before its closure.

He is represented in Hobart by Colville Street Gallery.

== Collections ==
Jenyns has artwork held in the following collections:

- Alice Springs Art Foundation
- Art Gallery of Ballarat
- Art Gallery of New South Wales
- Family Court Collection, Canberra
- Deakin University, Geelong
- Geelong Art Gallery
- Federation University Art Collection
- Heide Park and Art Gallery
- ICI Collection, Melbourne
- Kelvin Grove Teacher's College, Brisbane
- National Gallery of Australia, Canberra
- Museum of Contemporary Art, Brisbane
- New England Regional Art Museum
- Queen Victoria Museum & Art Gallery, Launceston
- Queensland Art Gallery
- Tasmanian Museum & Art Gallery
- University of Tasmania
- Visual Arts Board Collection

== Images of Bob Jenyns' work ==
For images of Jenyns' work refer to the following pages:

- Colville Street Gallery , Hobart
- Watters Gallery , Sydney
- Helen Lempriere National Sculpture Award
- Prints and Printmaking: Australia Asia Pacific
