= Special Assistance Resource Teacher =

The Victorian State Special Assistance Program (VSSAP) was a state-funded program in primary schools that operated from 1979 to 1982 in the Australian state of Victoria, following its initiation under the State's Liberal Government. The program introduced Special Assistance Resource Teachers (SARTs) to schools across the state. They were assigned to primary schools to identify students who needed additional support, assist in the diagnosis of learning difficulties, develop and implement appropriate programs, and work with teachers and parents to support student learning.

== The Special Assistance Program ==
The development and implementation of the Special Assistance Program added provisions to special education services for children experiencing learning difficulties and attempted to address declining literacy and numeracy standards. Previously, there was no policy within the Victorian Department of Education and Early Childhood Development (formerly Education Department of Victoria) directing primary school principals to develop special programs for pupils at risk of academic difficulties.

In July 1979, Assistant Minister of Education Norman Lacy established a Ministerial Committee on Special Assistance Programs. The committee consisted of school staff, special education facilities, teacher training institutions, and the Education Department administration. The committee's report was the basis upon which the Special Assistance Program was established. The major components recommended for the program were:

1. Designation of a Special Assistance Resource Teacher (SART) at 877 primary schools throughout Victoria (full-time at 575 schools with more than 300 pupils and half-time at 302 schools with 150-300 pupils);
2. Development of a 20-day Special Assistance In-Service Training Course to be delivered to designated SARTs without formal training in special education at four teacher training colleges;
3. Reorganization of existing special education support services into 50 state-wide Special Assistance Support Centers to be accessed by each primary school through its SART.

The process for the establishment of the Special Assistance Program in Victorian Primary Schools was outlined in a speech made by Lacy to SARTs at a seminar on 15 December 1980.

== Special Assistance Resource Teachers ==
=== Concept ===
The concept of a school-based resource teacher identifying deficits in childrens' reading and math skills, as well as helping classroom teachers address those deficits, had been supported by findings from major committees of inquiry. Several of the reports created by these committees were used as foundations for designing the Victorian Special Assistance Program, including:

- Report of the UK Committee of Inquiry appointed by the Secretary of State for Education and Science (the Bullock Report, 1975)
- Report of the Australian Parliament's House of Representatives Select Committee on Specific Learning Difficulties (the Cadman Report, 1976)
- Report of the Working Party on Provisions for Children with Special Needs (ACT, 1977)
- Report of the UK Committee of Inquiry into the Education of Handicapped Children and Young People (the Warnock Report, 1978)
- Report of Task Force 8 to the Victorian State Council for Special Education (1979)
- Report of the Victorian Ministerial Committee on Special Assistance Programs (1980)

The Special Assistance Program recognized the influence of a child's learning environment on their behavior and learning, as well as the right of children to have their learning needs met within the same education systems and social settings as their peers. The program also considered literacy and mathematical proficiency as essential parts of a functioning education system and designed the concept of SARTs to support those specific skills. In considering the wider social settings for students, the program saw classroom teachers and parents as integral to all aspects of a child's schooling, including curriculum development and day-to-day teaching activities. This position was supported by both the Australian Schools Commission's Report for the Triennium 1976-78 and the Warnock Report, which further asserted that if ordinary schools were to improve their ability to support children with special needs, then they would require special support from within their organization.

=== Functions ===
The functions of the SARTs were specifically prescribed by the government after consultation with the Victorian Teachers Union (VTU) and the Victorian Primary Principals Association (VPPA). They were:

1. To advise and assist classroom teachers in respect to: the identification of children in need of special assistance, the diagnosis of the learning problems being experienced by such children, the prescription of appropriate programs of special assistance which may be necessary to treat such problems, and the implementation of such programs;
2. To consult with and assist parents in respect to their role in the implementation of any program of special assistance which had been prescribed for their children;
3. To identify and recommend for referral children in need of psychological guidance, speech therapy, or other specialist services;
4. To ensure that children needing special assistance continue to participate in appropriate programs throughout their primary school life.

=== Appointment ===
The first stage of the Special Assistance Program was implemented after further consultation and a signed agreement by the Minister of Educational Services, the Hon. Norman Lacy, with the VTU and the VPPA.

From the beginning of the 1981-82 school year, SARTs were designated by their schools and appointed to the 575 primary schools with enrolments of greater than 300 pupils. These SARTs were mandated to establish the Special Assistance Program in their schools. The Education Department's Special Services Division and the Primary Division monitored progress and produced evaluative reports that were presented to the minister.

From the beginning of the 1982-83 school year, schools with an enrollment of between 150 and 300 pupils designated and appointed a SART to carry out the role on a part-time basis. This resulted in an additional 302 primary schools in Victoria having a school-based resource teacher, bringing the total to 877 schools. Designating a SART at schools with fewer than 150 pupils was not part of the plan. At such schools, it was intended that the principal or an appointed staff member would access Special Assistance Resource Centre services for children.

== In-Service Training Courses for SARTs ==
A component of stage one was the in-service education component for the SARTs designated by their schools. A survey of the qualifications and experience of the 575 designated SARTs was undertaken to assess their training requirements. The responses indicated that 200 of the designated teachers had already completed special education training courses. Of these, 102 were also experienced in special education teaching. Of the 375 remaining designated teachers, 28 were experienced special education teachers.

Four colleges of advanced education in Melbourne, Burwood, Bendigo, and Warrnambool were chosen to provide the training programs, for the designated teachers. A course planning committee created principles and a course content outline for a 20-day, one day per week special assistance training course. Course content focused on language, reading, mathematics, and identifying learning challenges. The course aimed to enable SARTs to devise and implement programs of special assistance in their respective schools. The acting director of teacher education sent invitations to all designated SARTs on 29 January, 1981, indicating that attendance was voluntary.

Most SARTs enrolled in the course. Many teachers from schools of less than 300 pupils were voluntarily designated by their principals as SARTs and also sought enrollment. As a result, not all requests for the in-service training course in the Special Assistance Program could be met in the first year of its availability. Throughout 1981, 290 SARTs undertook the course.

A survey of 160 teachers who completed this course found that, despite initial concerns, support was given from school principals and teachers for the concept of SART. However, most SARTs felt they needed more training in special education to fulfil their roles. AREA shared a concern that teachers undertaking SART duties were not qualified in special education, but their proposals to the course committee were rejected.
