= Battaglia Art Foundry =

The Battaglia Art Foundry (Fonderia Artistica Battaglia) is one of the oldest artistic bronze foundries in the world. It specializes in producing artistic sculptures using the lost-wax casting technique.

It was founded in 1913 by Ercole Battaglia, Giulio Pogliani and Riccardo Frigerio in Milan. For more than 100 years the Battaglia Foundry has worked with artists, sculptors and designers including Giannino Castiglioni, Alighiero Boetti, Arnaldo Pomodoro, Narciso Cassino, Lucio Fontana, Giuseppe Penone, Kengiro Azuma, and many others.

The foundry specializes in design and sculpture as well as restoration.

In 2016, the foundry established its annual award, the Battaglia Foundry Sculpture Prize (BFSP). The aim is to encourage young artists and promote the use of bronze and the lost-wax casting technique in contemporary art.

It was chosen as one of the Artistic Residencies by the Arte Laguna Prize.

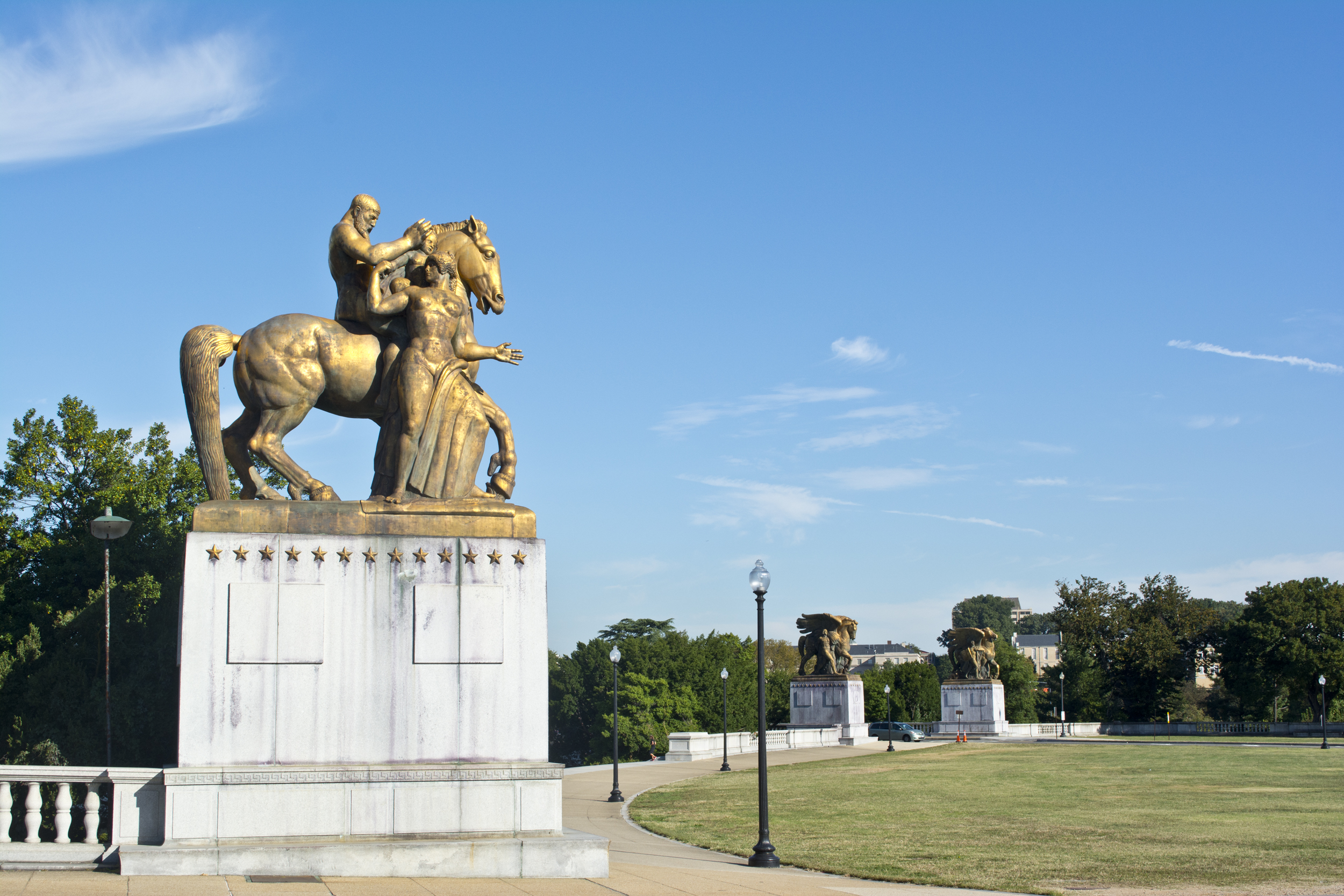
Sacrifice, one of the four sculptures comprising The Arts of War and The Arts of Peace in Washington, D.C.

== Most notable works ==
- The Monument to the Fallen in Magenta by Giannino Castiglioni (1925);
- The bronze doors of the Milan Cathedral by Giannino Castiglioni (1945);
- One of the four equestrian groups for Arlington Memorial Bridge (The Arts of War and The Arts of Peace) in Washington, D.C.;
- The 14-meter statue of Madonna della Guardia, by Narciso Cassino (one of the largest bronze castings in existence) (1958);
- The door of the Siena Cathedral by Enrico Manfrini (1958);
- The replica of the bronze Byzantine horses for the Basilica of San Marco in Venice (1979);
- Statue of Pope Paul VI by Floriano Bodini (1986);
- Self-Portrait sculpture by Alighiero Boetti (1993);
- Sphere within Sphere sculpture for the UN headquarters in New York by Arnaldo Pomodoro (1996).
