= Giò Pomodoro =

Italian sculptor (1930–2002)

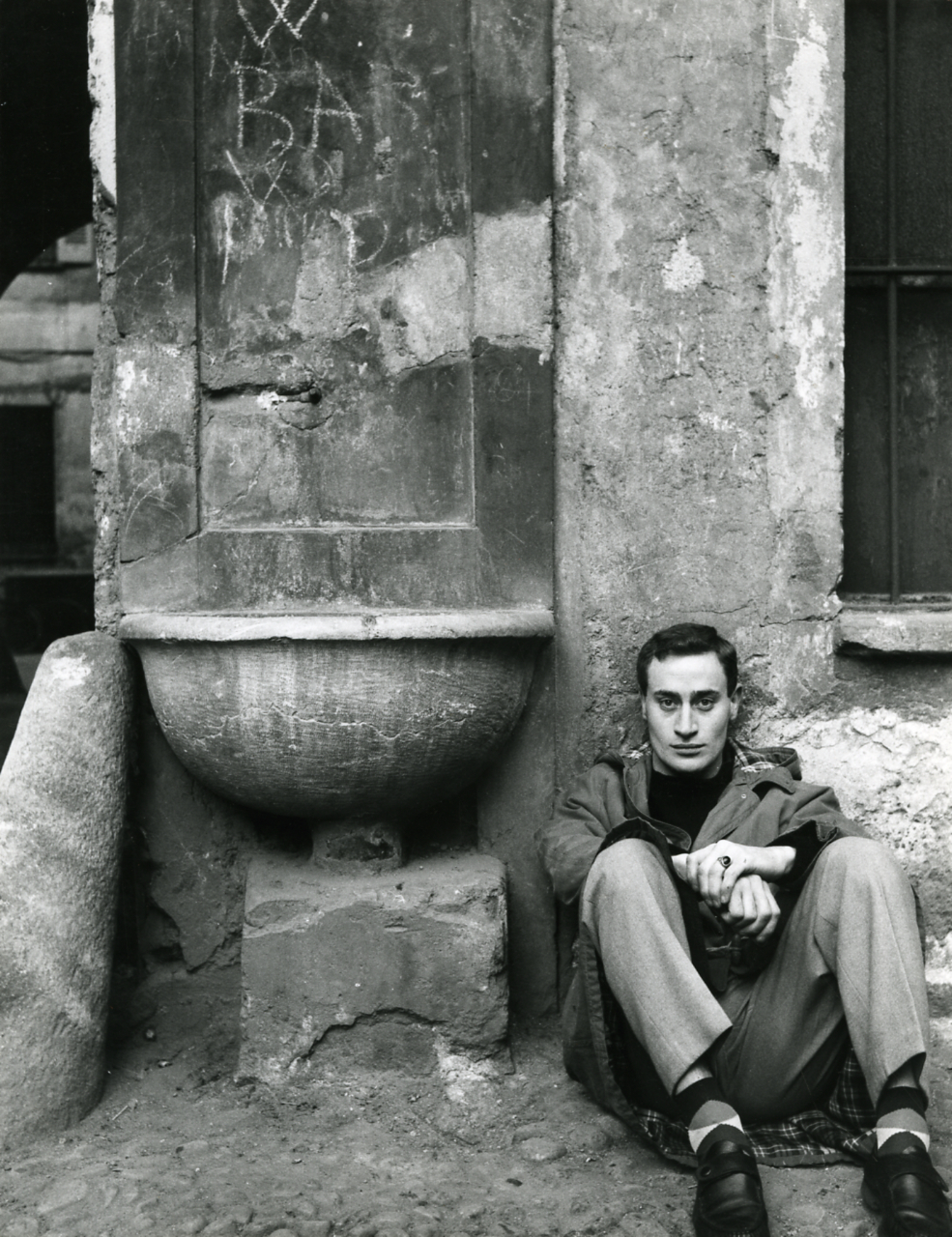
- Giò Pomodoro photographed by Paolo Monti in 1958
- Born: Giorgio Pomodoro; 17 November 1930; Orciano di Pesaro, Italy
- Died: 21 December 2002 (aged 72); Milan, Italy
- Known for: sculptor
- Relatives: Arnaldo Pomodoro (brother)

Giorgio Pomodoro (17 November 1930 – 21 December 2002), better known as Giò Pomodoro (pronounced [ˈdʒɔ pomoˈdɔːro]), was an Italian sculptor, printmaker, and stage designer. His brother was the sculptor Arnaldo Pomodoro.

In 1954, he moved to Milan, where he associated with leading avant-garde artists and started making jewelry. He then began to produce reverse reliefs in clay and also formed assemblages of various materials, including wood, textiles, and plaster subsequently cast in metal.

During the 1960s, he developed several series of sculptures, which explored a range of abstract shapes, usually with smooth undulating surfaces. In his later career, Pomodoro regularly received public commissions and produced a number of large outdoor structures.

Pomodoro died in Milan, on 21 December 2002, aged 72.

Works by Giò Pomodoro in his studio in Milan, photographed by Paolo Monti

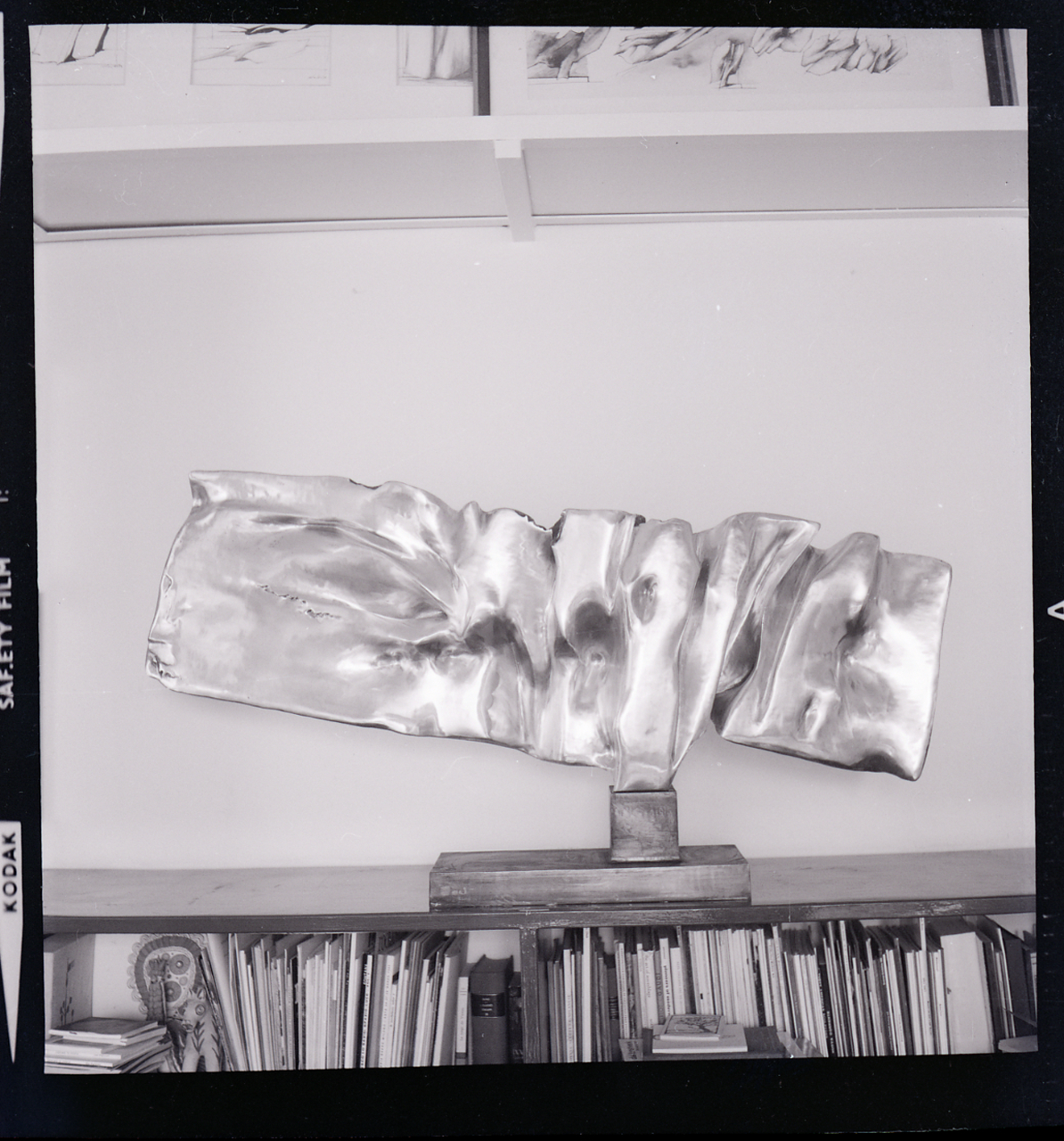
Sculpture. 1964 photo.

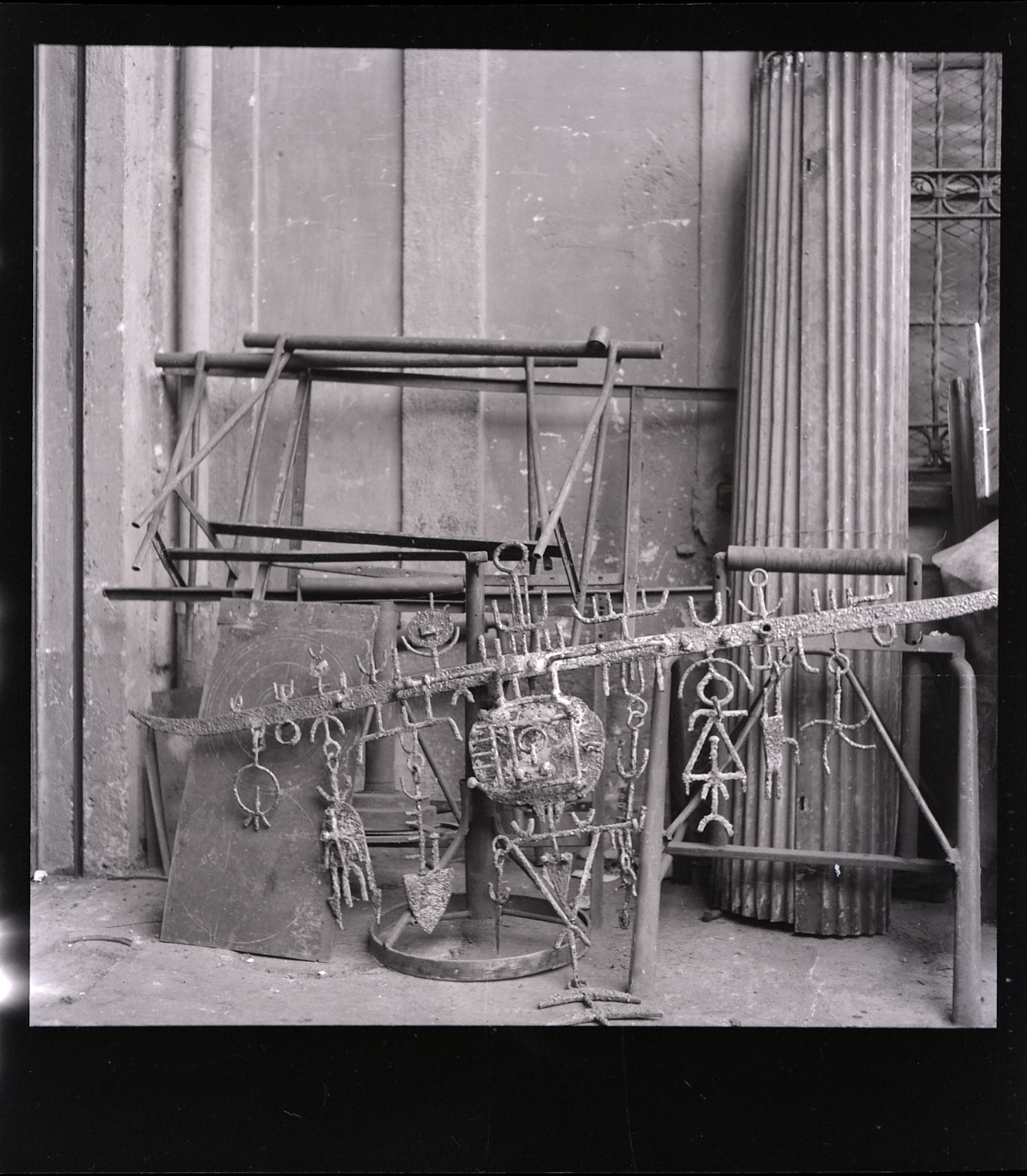
1965

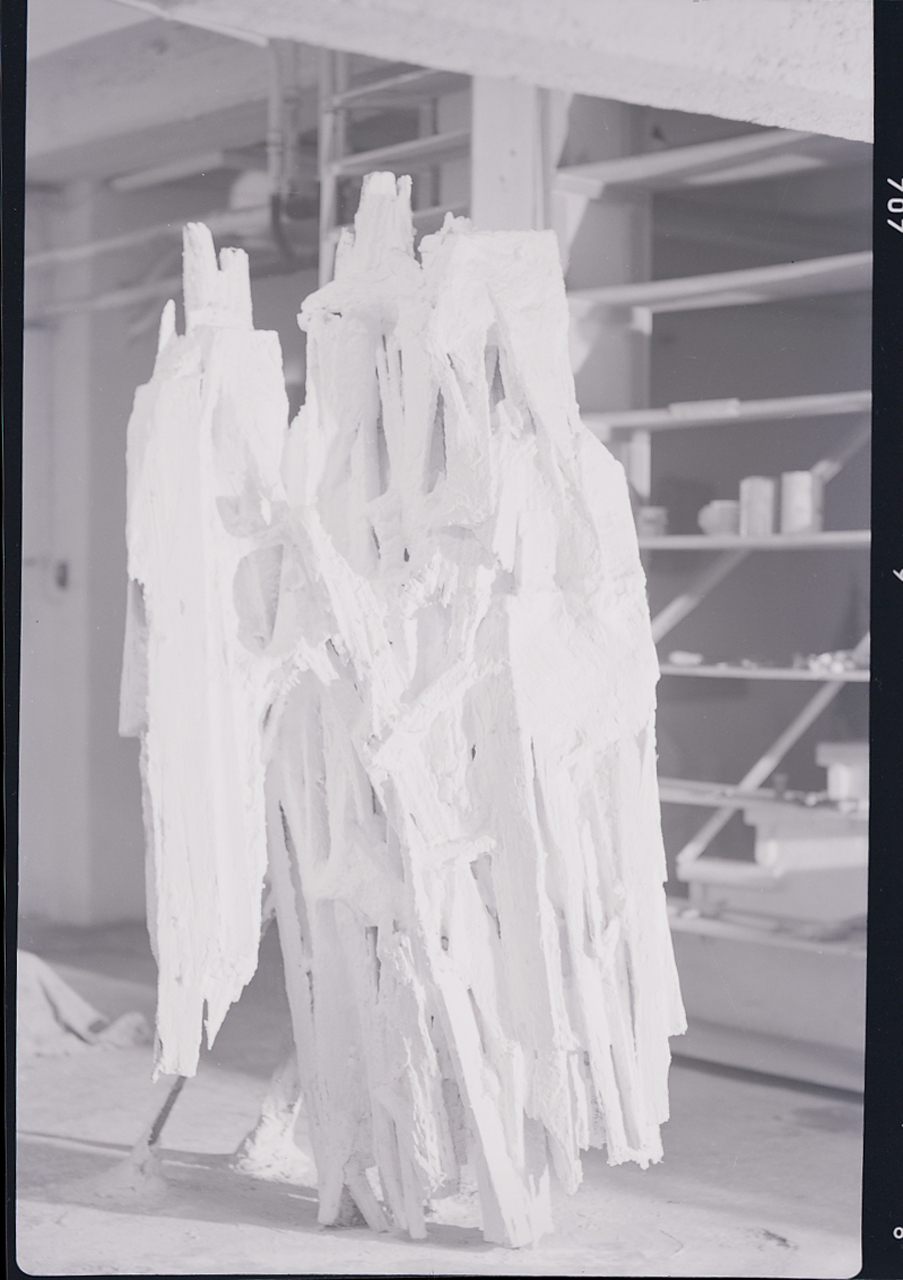
1965

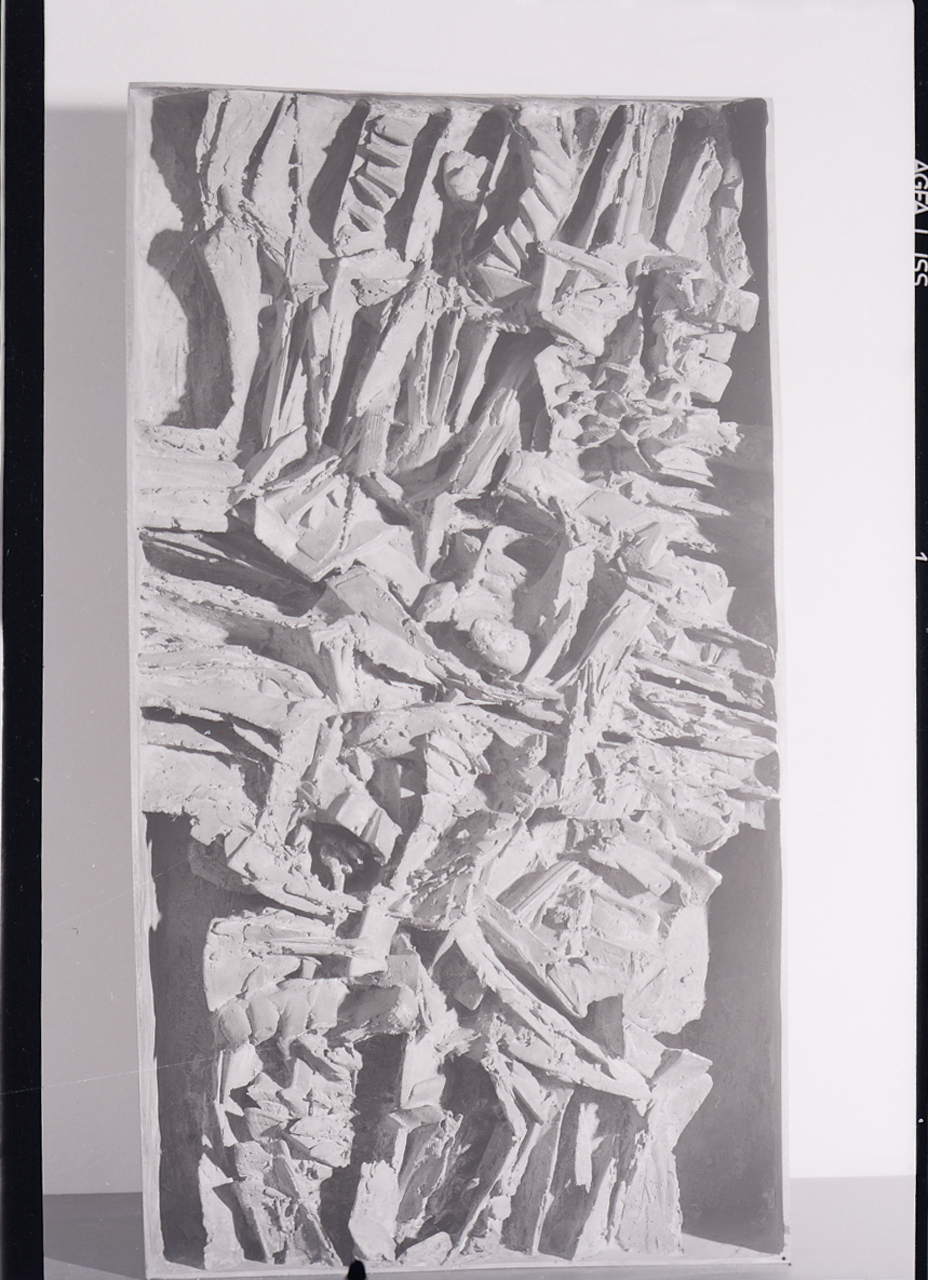
1965

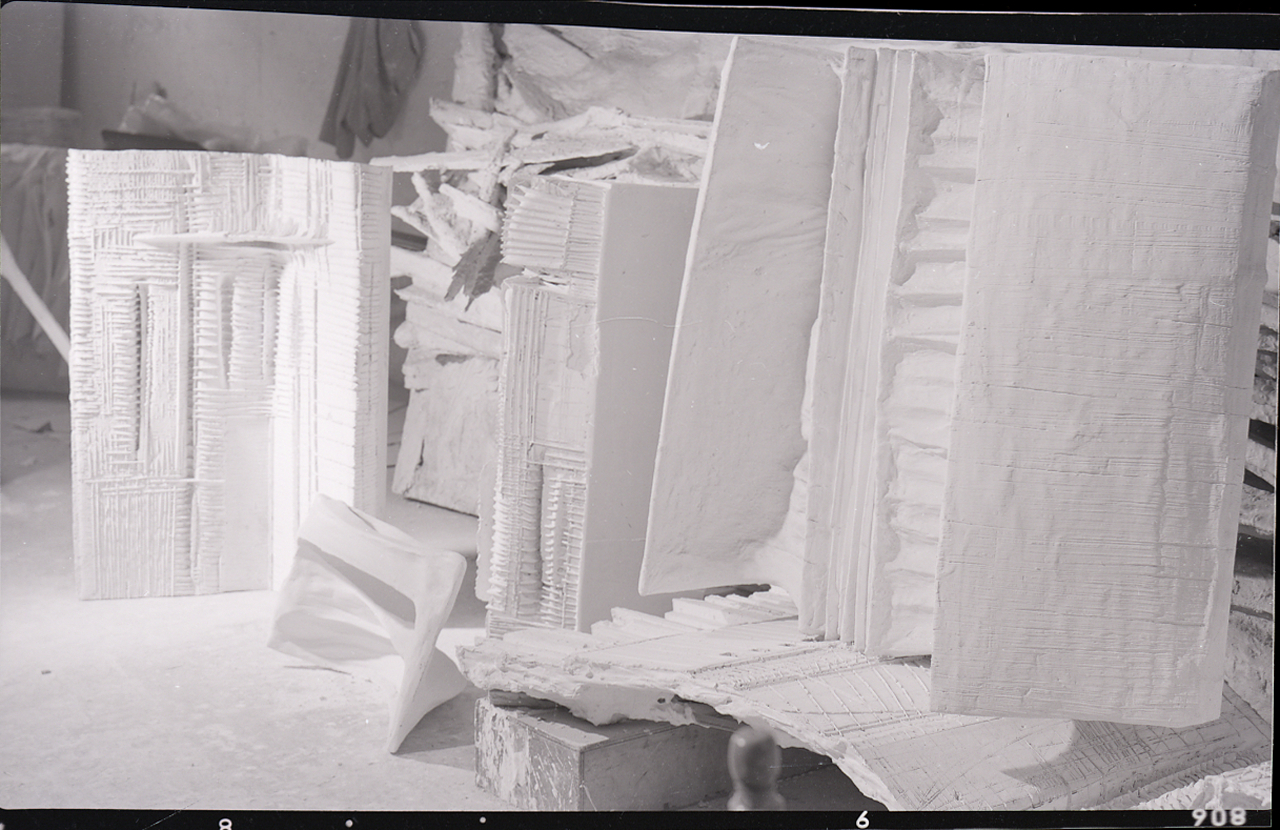
1965

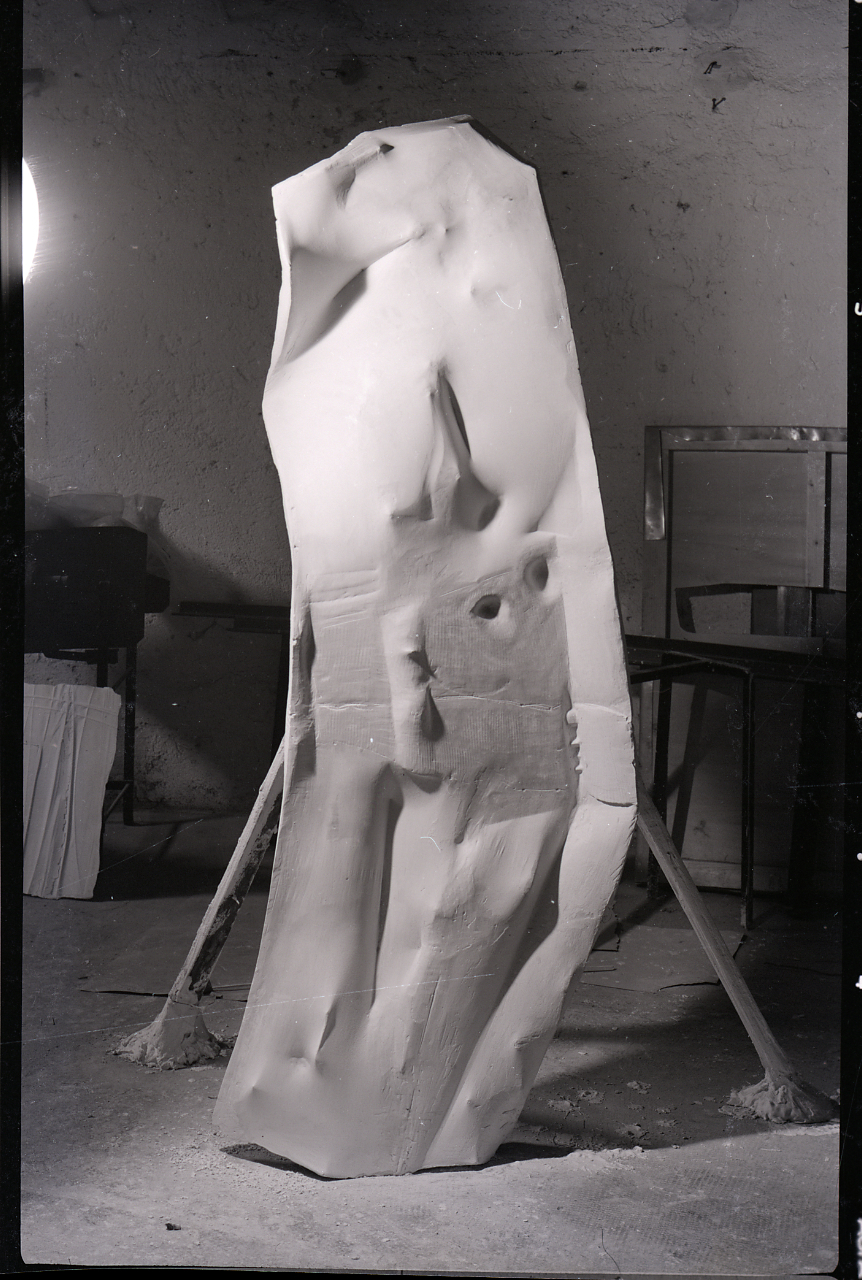
1965

== Awards and honors ==
- Lifetime Achievement in Contemporary Sculpture from the International Sculpture Center 2002
- In 2002 the artist was honored with an untitled work in the Simpósio Internacional de Esculturas do Brasil, in Brusque, Santa Catarina, Brazil.
