= The Arts of War and The Arts of Peace =

Sculptures by Leo Friedlander in Washington, DC

The Arts of War
and
The Arts of Peace

The Arts of War by Leo Friedlander, Valor (foreground), Sacrifice (background), photographed in 2026.

The Arts of Peace by James Earle Fraser, Aspiration and Literature (foreground) Music and Harvest (background), photographed in 2026.

The Arts of War and The Arts of Peace are bronze statue groups on Lincoln Memorial Circle in West Potomac Park in Washington, D.C., in the United States. Commissioned in 1929 to complement the plaza constructed on the east side of the Lincoln Memorial as part of the Arlington Memorial Bridge approaches, their completion was delayed until 1939 for budgetary reasons. The models were placed into storage, and the statues not cast until 1950. They were erected in 1951, and repaired in 1974. Originally fire-gilded, the statues were brush electroplated in 1974 and covered in 23.75-karat gold leaf in 2026.

The Arts of War were sculpted by Leo Friedlander, an American sculptor. The Art Deco statuary group consists of two separate elements, Valor and Sacrifice, which frame the entrance to Arlington Memorial Bridge.

The Arts of Peace were sculpted by James Earle Fraser, an American sculptor. The Neoclassical statuary group consists of two separate elements, Music and Harvest and Aspiration and Literature, which frame the entrance to the Rock Creek and Potomac Parkway.

The Arts of War and The Arts of Peace are contributing properties to the East and West Potomac Parks Historic District, which was added to the National Register of Historic Places on November 30, 1973.

== Arlington Memorial Bridge and Rock Creek Parkway ==
Congress first proposed a new bridge across the Potomac River, to be located somewhere between B Street NW and Georgetown in 1886. Designs were proposed in 1886 and 1898, but neither was built.

A new location became available in 1890. When terrible floods hit the District of Columbia in 1881, Congress enacted legislation to have the channel of the Potomac River deepened to help prevent future flooding. The silt would be used to reclaim the Tiber Creek tidal inlet, building up the land south of B Street and west of the Washington Monument grounds to a height great enough to act as a levee. This work was largely complete by 1890, and designated West Potomac Park by Congress in 1897. During this same period, Columbia Island formed as an offshoot of Analostan Island. The combination of reclaimed land and the emergence of a new island meant that it was now possible to build a bridge even further south than the previously proposed locations.

In 1902, the Senate Park Commission proposed in its so-called McMillan Plan that a bridge be built from the west end of West Potomac Park (which the commission successfully proposed as the site for the Lincoln Memorial) across the Potomac River to Arlington National Cemetery. This bridge would be aligned with Arlington House, and act as memorial to the unification of the nation after the American Civil War.

No action was taken to implement the Senate Park Commission's proposal for 12 years. Congress finally enacted the Public Buildings Act on March 4, 1913, which, among other things, created and funded an Arlington Memorial Bridge Commission (AMBC) whose purpose was to design the bridge and report back to Congress. But due to the onset of World War I, Congress appropriated no money for the commission's operation and it remained inactive.

Another proposal of the McMillan Plan was the creation of a number of parkways throughout the D.C. area. Among these was the Rock Creek and Potomac Parkway, which the Senate Park Commission suggested extend from E Street NW through Rock Creek Park to the National Zoological Park. Congress authorized construction of the parkway in March 1913 and principal construction began in 1923.

Congress finally authorized construction of the Arlington Memorial Bridge in 1925. Major traffic jams clogged the narrow and decrepit Highway Bridge during the November 1921 dedication of the Tomb of the Unknown Soldier at Arlington National Cemetery, angering members of Congress and President Warren G. Harding. Recognizing the need for a new bridge, Congress enacted legislation in June 1922 funding at last the work of the Arlington Memorial Bridge Commission. The bridge commission on April 4, 1923, chose the architectural firm of McKim, Mead and White to design the structure. Architect William Mitchell Kendall was the lead designer.

=== Initial designs for the eastern Arlington Memorial Bridge approaches ===
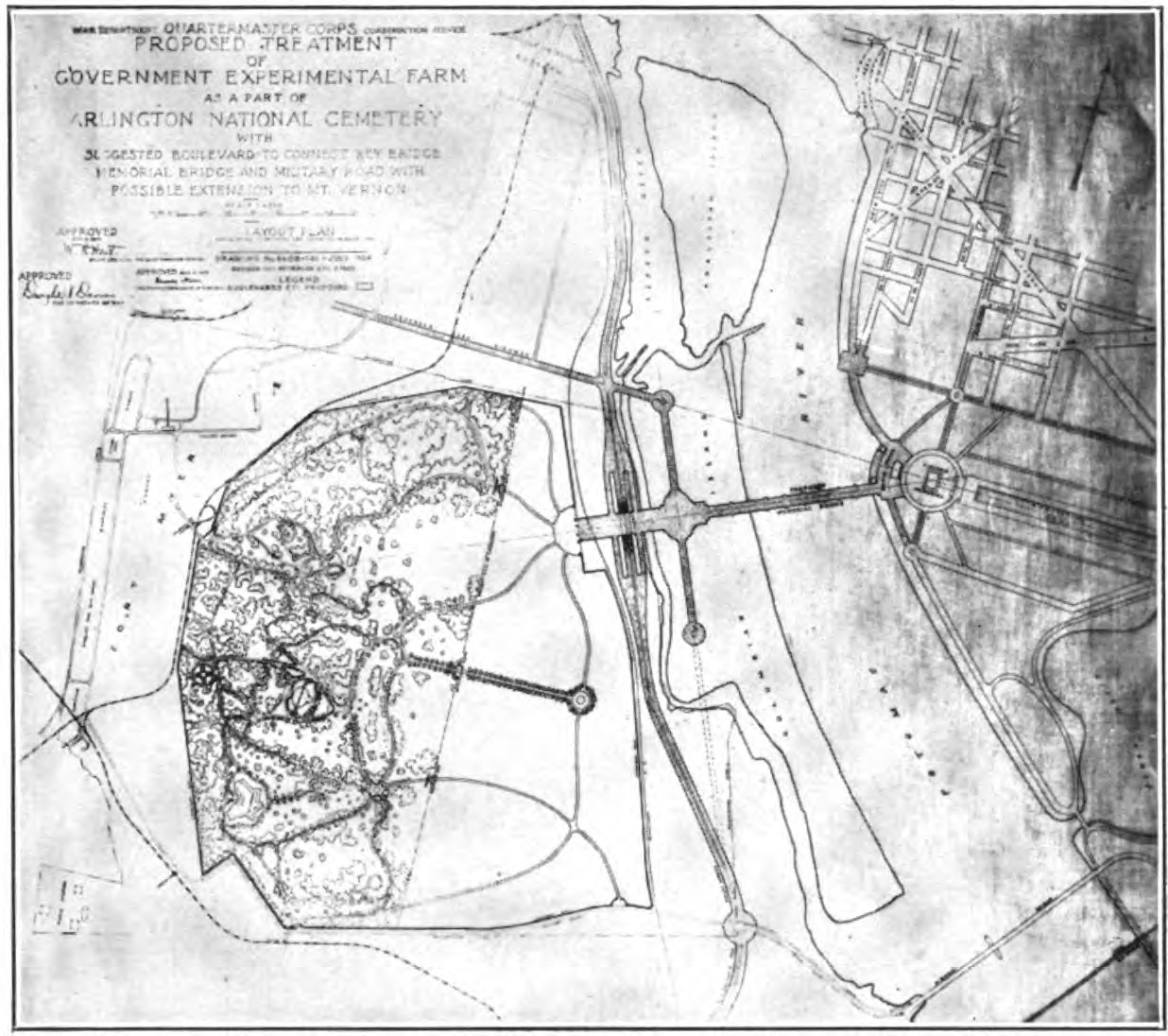
Original approved plan of 1926 for the design of Arlington Memorial Bridge's eastern and western approaches, and the treatment for the entrance to Rock Creek and Potomac Parkway.

The United States Commission of Fine Arts (CFA) had the legal authority to review the design and architectural style of the bridge. Kendall submitted his first design for the structure to the CFA in May 1923. Kendall's plan envisioned a low, Neoclassical arch bridge. The eastern approaches in the District of Columbia consisted of linking the traffic circle around the Lincoln Memorial to the Potomac River by a granite and marble plaza and by monumental marble steps (the "watergate") leading from the plaza to the river's edge. Two memorial columns would be erected in this plaza. The commission was especially pleased that Kendall proposed extending the Rock Creek and Potomac Parkway past its planned terminus at E Street NW south to Ohio Drive SW (a road completed in 1916). Kendall's plan called for the parkway to pass through the plaza (rather than beneath the Arlington Memorial Bridge via an underpass) to access Ohio Drive.

The CFA gave its preliminary approval to the bridge design in February 1924, but withheld a decision on the eastern approaches.

With a design in hand, Congress began work to authorize construction of the proposed bridge. This legislation passed on February 20, and President Calvin Coolidge signed it into law on February 24, 1925.

=== Revised designs for the eastern Arlington Memorial Bridge approaches ===
The AMBC and CFA were not only concerned with constructing a bridge, but ensuring that the approaches to the bridge were appropriate for a grand memorial.

The eastern approaches consisted of the end of the bridge, a plaza, a watergate, and the streets which approached the bridge. By November 1925, there were already some design changes as the details of Kendall's plan were worked out. The two columns for the center of the plaza were replaced with a fountain, and then the fountain, too, eliminated. For the bridge's entrance, the AMBC and CFA add two 40-foot (12 m) high square pylons inscribed on all four sides with images representing national unity and common purpose. The agencies also planned major changes to B Street NW, a major D.C. city street funneling traffic to the bridge. B Street would be significantly widened to turn it into a vast ceremonial avenue, and its length extended past 23rd Street NW to the shore of the Potomac River (where a new pedestrian overlook would be constructed). B Street would also be connected to the Lincoln Memorial by a new road (now called Henry Bacon Drive). 23rd Street NW was also to be widened to provide a more grand north-south route to the Lincoln Memorial. These roads, along with Ohio Drive SW, came together west of the Lincoln Memorial, where Kendall proposed a large granite and marble traffic plaza across which traffic would flow. A grand access to the Rock Creek and Potomac Parkway was of the bridge project as well. Two 40-foot (12 m) high square pylons with sculpture groups clustered about their bases were planned here as well, to complement those at the bridge.

But in 1928 there was growing concern by members of the CFA that the pylons "complicated" the view toward the Lincoln Memorial from the bridge. To assist the commission in making up its mind, the Army Signal Corps produced life-size photographs of mock-ups of the pylons, and erected them on site for the CFA to view in late September 1928. Life-size photographs of shorter pylons were also viewed on-site, but the CFA concluded that both versions were too tall. Life-size photographs of equestrian statues were tried, and found to be acceptable. In early December 1928, the CFA voted to order Kendall to change the pylons to equestrian statues.

== Designing the statues ==
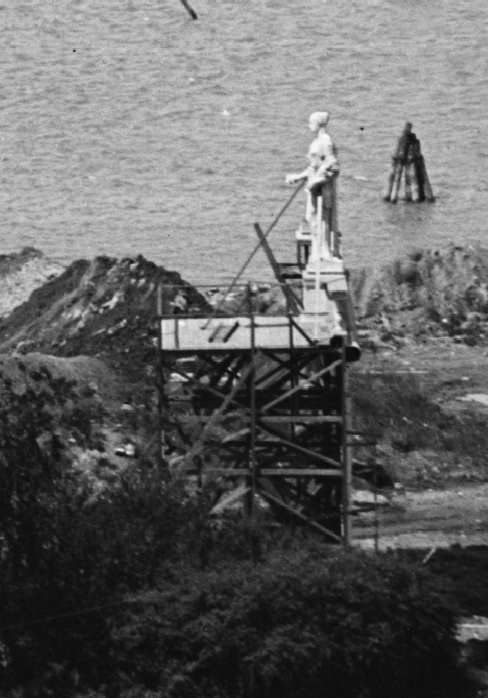
Statuary mock-ups on view during the construction of Arlington Memorial Bridge in May 1928.

=== Hiring Fraser and Friedlander ===
Kendall fought to retain the eastern terminus pylons even as the CFA continued to move ahead with plans for equestrian statuary. James Earle Fraser and Leo Friedlander were both commissioned to craft sculptures for the eastern terminus. Just how Fraser and Friedlander were chosen is unclear. Fraser's biographer, August Freundlich, and the National Park Service both say there was a competition. Freundlich puts the date of this competition as 1931, and gives no further details. This contradicts reports from the Office of Public Buildings and Public Parks and Washington Post, which point to a selection process (not necessarily a competition) in 1929. Friedlander's biographers, however, state the artist was directly chosen in 1929. Museum curator Joel Rosenkranz says Friedlander's commission came directly from the firm of McKim, Mead & White, and mentions no competition.

=== Winning approval for the statue designs ===
Government regulations required that sculptors create four versions of their work in plaster before final approval for construction could begin. These models had to be a one-sixteenth size, three-sixteenths size, half size, and full size. At least some preliminary designs for the equestrian statues (perhaps the one-sixteenth size models) were ready by June 1929. The CFA further discussed the equestrian sculptures at its meeting on December 11, 1929, and Kendall gave up on his attempt to restore the pylons by the end of the year.

By early 1930, Friedlander and Fraser were in discussion with the Army Corps of Engineers about the placement, erection, and pedestals for the two equestrian groups. The Corps also worked with McKim, Mead and White to study the area and determine the correct height and placement of the statues.

Lieutenant Colonel Ulysses S. Grant III was a member of the Army Corps of Engineers as well as the Executive Officer of the AMBC. On July 1, 1930, Grant provided the CFA with a refinement of plans for the eastern approaches. At this meeting, the CFA again approved the designs for the equestrian statues. (This likely was approval to proceed to construction of the three-sixtheenth size models).

The CFA approved yet another of Fraser and Friedlander's models in December 1930. (These were probably the three-sixteenths size models.) Details about the sculptures now began to emerge. Friedlander's two statuary groups were called Valor and Call to Arms (later retitled Sacrifice). These two groups were to frame the entrance to Arlington Memorial Bridge. Collectively, they were known as The Arts of War. Both statuary groups were in a style of Art Deco known as "Delayed Deco". Valor was based on a study Friedlander had completed in 1915–16 while a fellow at the American Academy in Rome, while Sacrifice was created especially for the bridge commission. Sacrifice, modeled in 1929, used the same figures as Valor but added the figure of a child. Because the AMBC specified that the statues were to be in white granite, Friedlander had to change his design for Valor. The sculpture was originally to be executed in bronze. But in order to support the weight of granite, a "web" of supports had to be sculpted beneath the horse.

Fraser's two statuary groups were titled Music and Harvest and Aspiration and Literature. These two groups were to frame the entrance to the Rock Creek and Potomac Parkway. Collectively, they were known as The Arts of Peace. Both statuary groups were in the Neoclassical style, although they also exhibited elements of Art Moderne.

Contracts (probably for full-size models) were let within a few days of the CFA's December 11, 1930, meeting.

=== Funding delays ===
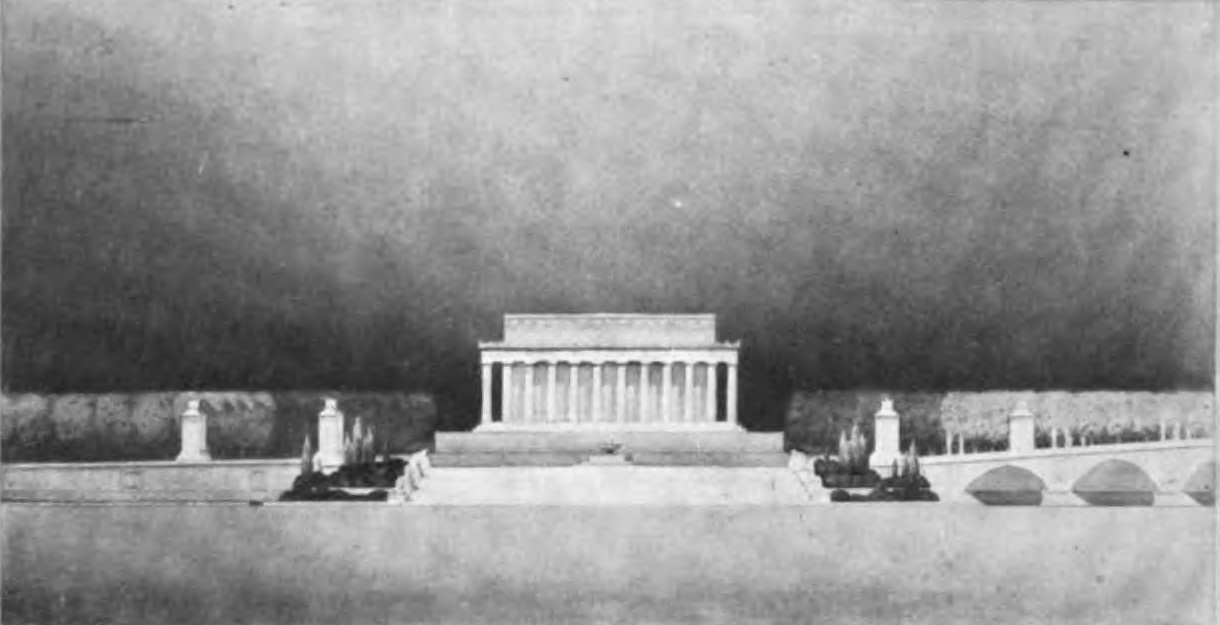
Original 1926 design for pylons rather than statuary at the Watergate Steps.

Additional plans for the placement of these statue groups were discussed in January 1931. Full-size photographic mock-ups of the bridge statuary (again made by the Army Signal Corps) were viewed on-site by the CFA on July 1, 1931.

There was a sense by the CFA, however, that work on the statue groups was proceeding so well that the commission might approve the work before the full-size models were complete. Consequently, the commission visited Fraser's Westport, Connecticut, studio on October 24, 1932, and approved his models.

As the half-size models were nearing completion in 1933, the CFA suspended the project. By now, the United States was in the depths of the Great Depression. The bridge was finished and slightly over budget, and Congress was increasingly unwilling to appropriate money for any further construction except the most critical remaining construction items (such as roadways). Obtaining funds for the costly granite and expensive carving was politically impossible. Furthermore, what funds were available were impounded under the Economy Act of 1933. Nevertheless, the CFA wanted very much to proceed with the statues. With the full-size models already paid for, it asked the sculptors to finish their work. The Commission of Fine Arts visited Friedlander's White Plains, New York, studio on October 14, 1933, and approved his models.

By October 1933, the CFA had also resolved other aesthetic issues regarding the statues. In addition to approving the height of the statues (each would be 16 feet (4.9 m) tall), it set the height of the pedestals at 13 feet (4.0 m) and the height of the plinth beneath the statues at 1 foot (0.30 m). Granite from Mount Airy, North Carolina, would be used for the plinths and pedestals.

=== Switch to bronze from granite ===
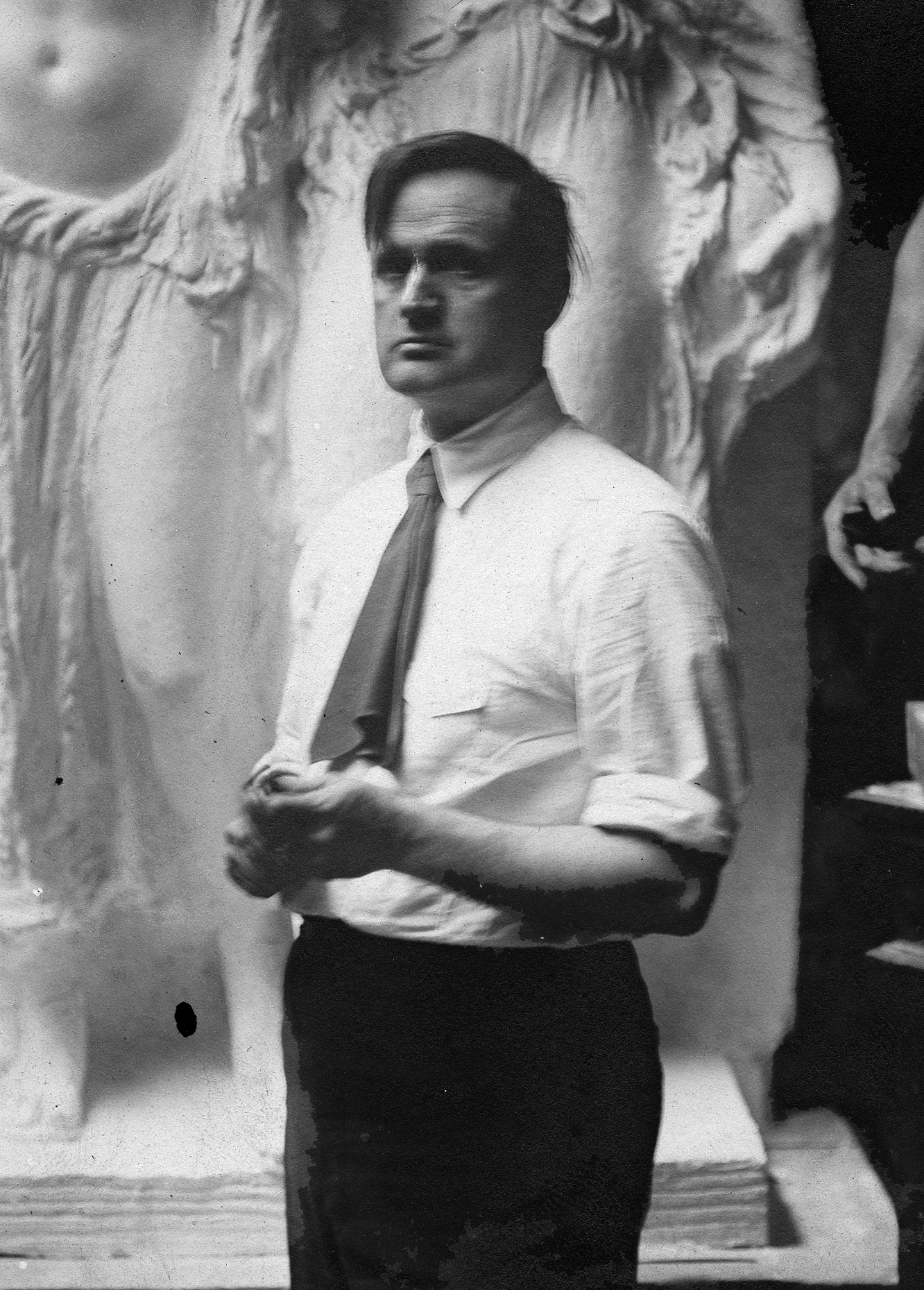
James Earle Fraser (shown here in his studio) and his former student, Edward Minazolli, traveled to Italy to supervise the casting and gilding.

With little urgency, Fraser and Friedlander went ahead at a slow pace on their work. Partial funding for the granite statues was secured in 1935, but these monies were again impounded. The CFA asked Congress to approve funding for the statues in 1937, but this effort was unsuccessful. Additional efforts to win funding from Congress were made in 1938 and 1939, but also failed. Fraser and Friedlander completed work on their full-size models in 1939.

With the full-size plasters ready, the CFA made another push for funds in 1940. Money appeared to be available in the National Park Service budget, but bids for the granite and carving came in $70,000 too high. James Earle Fraser then suggested that the statues be cast in bronze or Benedict nickel (an alloy of copper and nickel). Friedlander and the CFA agreed with this suggestion, and in August 1941 both sculptors signed contracts to redesign their models for casting in bronze. For Friedlander, this meant removing the "web" supports beneath his horses and returning to his original design.

Lobbying Congress for money halted for a time while work proceeded on Friedlander's revisions. Money for the project became unavailable during World War II, and bronze was diverted to the war effort.

=== Search for foundries ===
On January 23, 1946, CFA member and sculptor Lee Lawrie visited the Friedlander workshop with an official of the National Park Service. They inspected the revised full-size model, and reported to the CFA on January 26 that it was satisfactory. By this time, however, the cost of casting in bronze had nearly doubled in the post-war period to more than $100,000 per statue. The National Capital Region of the National Park Service agreed to dismantle and store the Fraser and Friedlander models until such time as the prices for casting were more reasonable. In the summer of 1947, Fraser surveyed foundries in Europe to see which might offer the least expensive casting. The single response indicated that it would cost $212,000 to cast both of his statues. The Fraser and Friedlander statues were re-approved by the CFA in October 1947.

In January 1948, the National Park Service informed the CFA that about $1 million in authorized funds existed to complete Arlington Memorial Bridge. Fraser reported on his summer 1947 survey of foundry costs, and at the urging of the Park Service the CFA submitted legislation to Congress asking for an initial $185,000 appropriation to begin the casting process. But the legislation did not pass in the first session of the 80th Congress.

At the CFA's meeting on September 13, 1948, the commission again discussed how to win an appropriation to complete the statue groups. The National Park made a survey American foundries, and told the CFA that few had been converted from war work back to art casting. Furthermore, only one foundry was large enough to handle the work, and it demanded an escalator clause in its contract. The park service expressed its opinion that an escalator clause would not be approved by federal budget officials. Members of Congress suggested, however, that a European nation be asked to cast the statues as part of the Marshall Plan. There was widespread agreement among CFA members and the sculptors that this should be pursued.

Meanwhile, on February 20, 1950, the CFA began reconsidering the height of the statues' pedestals. The previously approved pedestals were deemed to be too low, and the CFA considered raising them to 16 feet (4.9 m). The Park Service made life-size silhouettes of the statues, and the CFA made a site visit to the plaza on the east side of the Lincoln Memorial to view the mock-ups. After viewing the silhouettes, the CFA agreed not to make any changes to the pedestals' height. The commission did, however, begin to discuss what inscriptions might be made on the pedestals.

=== Casting in Italy ===
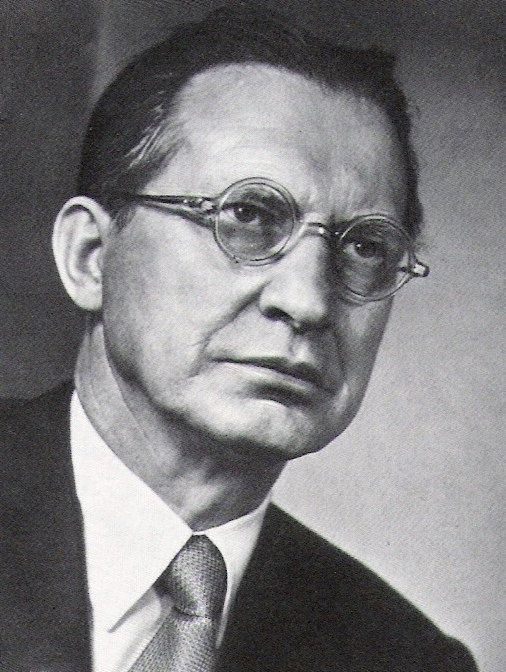
Italian Prime Minister Alcide De Gasperi attended the statues' dedication in the United States.

In 1949, the government of Italy expressed its interest in using Marshall Plan funds to cast the four Arlington Memorial Bridge statues. In October, officials of the National Park Service and sculptors Fraser and Friedlander traveled to Italy to inspect various foundries and negotiate a deal.

An agreement was reached, and casting began in 1950. The plaster models arrived in Italy in January. Customs officials, however, were not made aware of how to properly house and care for them, and the plaster statues stood outdoors in cold, snowy, and rainy weather for several weeks. Fraser's student, Edward Minazolli, traveled to Italy to help oversee the casting process, and discovered the models had deteriorated. With Fraser and Friedlander's permission, he made repairs to the plaster models (taking care to not offend the Italians or make them aware that they had inadvertently damaged them).

The Arturo Bruni Foundry in Rome and the Fonderia Lagana in Naples cast the sculptures using the lost-wax casting process. The foundries intended to use fire-gilding to finish the statues. Fire-gilding is a process in which gold leaf and mercury are applied to the bronze. Fire is applied to the area, which causes the gold to adhere to the bronze and the mercury to evaporate. But several problems were encountered during both the casting and gilding phases. The foundries wanted to use joints that while less expensive to cast would not wear well, and the sculptors were forced to intervene to achieve the required quality. Samples of fire-gilded bronze were shipped to the United States, where it was discovered the color was too bright. This required both sculptors to intervene again to achieve the correct color. Minzolli then visited the foundries to check on the castings. He discovered that the Bruni foundry did excellent casting, but its gilding was poor. The casting at the Fonderia Lagana foundry was also of high quality, but not quite as good as that in Rome. Its gilding was better than the Roman foundry's, however. Fraser looked into moving part of the casting work to the Artistic Foundry Battaglia in Milan and the Ferdinando Marinelli Artistic Foundry in Florence. The Milan foundry's work was at least as good as that done at the Neapolitan foundry. The Florentine foundry, however, did good casting work but exceptionally poor gilding. In the end, the gilding work on Valor was done in Milan and Sacrifice in Florence. The Rome foundry did both casting and gilding on Aspiration and Literature, while Naples did casting and gilding for Music and Harvest. Spending $58,000 ($719,423 in 2025 dollars) on gold, more than 100 pounds (45 kg) of 24-karat gold (currently worth $2,625,000) was used in the gilding process.

=== Dedication ===
The four statue groups were finished in late April 1951. They were unveiled on May 3 and then displayed at several Italian fairs before being shipped to the United States. When Valor was moved through the streets of Milan, huge crowds followed, shouting, "The Renaissance has returned! The Renaissance has returned!" The four statue groups were transported from Milan to Norfolk, Virginia, aboard the SS Rice Victory, then placed aboard a United States Navy barge and taken up the Potomac River to Washington, D.C.

The four statue groups were dedicated on Wednesday, September 26, 1951. The United States Army Band and Italian opera singer Ezio Pinza provided music at the dedication. Secretary of the Interior Oscar L. Chapman presided over the event. Secretary of State Dean Acheson introduced the Prime Minister of Italy, Alcide De Gasperi, who offered the statues to the United States as a gift of the Italian people in gratitude for American assistance in rebuilding Italy after World War II. President Harry S. Truman accepted the statues, which were then unveiled by the wives of James Earle Fraser and Leo Friedlander. In his remarks following the unveiling, President Truman pledged to remove certain military, economic, and other constraints on Italy imposed by a 1947 peace treaty.

== Statues ==
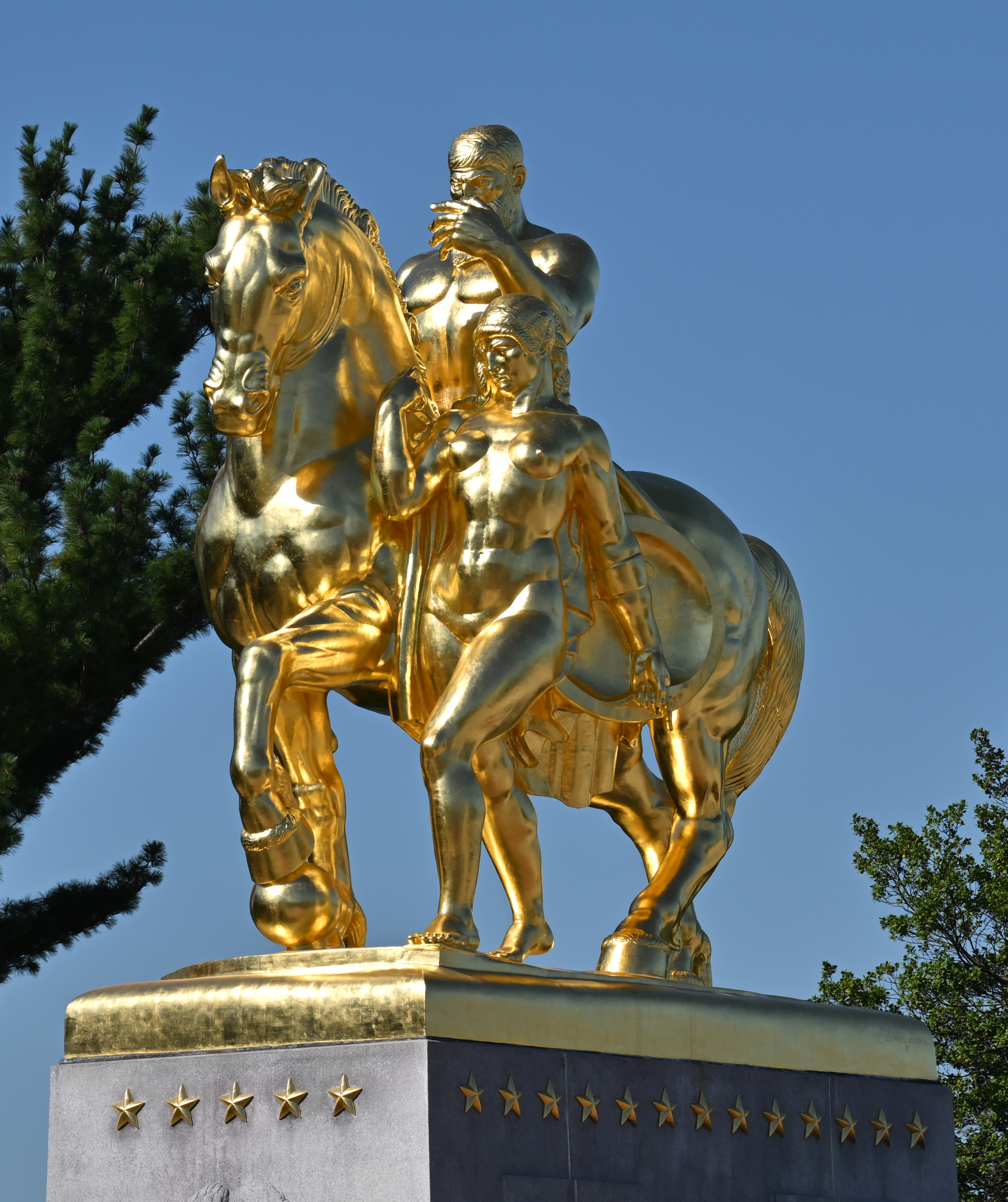
Arts of War: Valor in 2026

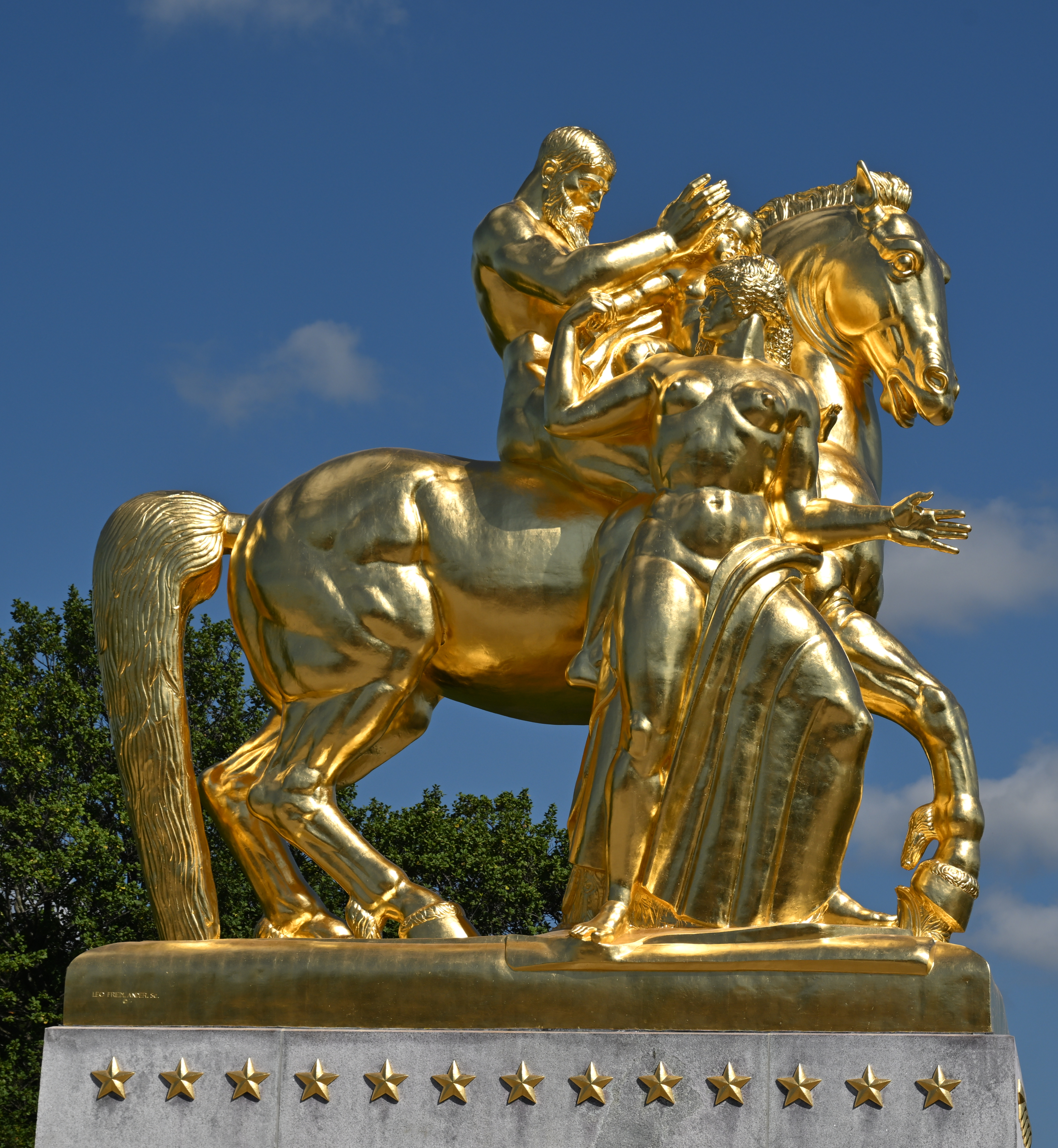
Arts of War: Sacrifice in 2026

Arts of Peace "Aspiration and Literature" after reguilding. October 7, 2026. Washington, DC

Arts of Peace: Music and Harvest in 2026

The Arts of War consists of two statue groups, Valor and Sacrifice. Both are in a style of Art Deco known as "Delayed Deco". Facing Arlington Memorial Bridge from the District of Columbia, Valor is on the left and Sacrifice is on the right. Valor consists of a bearded, muscular male nude symbolic of Mars, the ancient Roman god of war. To his left is a semi-nude female striding forward, a shield attached to her left, trailing forearm. Sacrifice shows the same figures, but in different poses. The nude male now holds a small child in his arms, his head bowed. The semi-nude female is to his right, her back to him and the horse. But her head is turned backward to look at the rider, her right arm reaching up to touch his right elbow.

The Arts of Peace (also known as The Peaceful Arts) consists of two statue groups, Music and Harvest and Aspiration and Literature. Both are in the Neoclassical style, although they also exhibit elements of Art Moderne. Facing Rock Creek Parkway from the Lincoln Memorial traffic circle, Aspiration and Literature is on the left and Music and Harvest is on the right. Pegasus, the mythological source of inspiration and poetry, is the centerpiece of both statue groups. Aspiration and Literature consists of a nude male on Pegasus' right with a toga over his left shoulder and an open book in his trailing right hand (symbolic of literature), and on Pegasus' left a nude male (both shoulders draped with a toga) aiming a bow backward (symbolic of aspiration). A serpent trails behind the personification of literature, symbolizing wisdom and knowledge. Music and Harvest consists of a nude male on Pegasus' right holding a sickle and carrying a sheaf of cut wheat over his shoulder (symbolic of harvest), and a semi-nude female on Pegasus' left holding a harp in her trailing left hand (symbolic of music). Behind the woman is a turtle, symbolizing the belief that "art is long and time is fleeting".

As completed, each statue group weighed about 80,000 pounds (36,000 kg). Each was 19 feet (5.8 m) high, 16 feet (4.9 m) long, and 8 feet (2.4 m) wide. The pieces of Sacrifice and Valor were welded together. Music and Harvest and Aspiration and Literature were bolted together. Flanges were cast on the interior, and steel bolts used to hold the pieces together. Music and Harvest is different from the others in that it also has a central seam along which many other pieces are bolted. Perforated plates of steel (known as "tie-plates") are bolted to this seam as well. Steel bolts were used in all the statues to join pieces together, and steel angle irons were used in each statue's interior to make them more rigid. The total cost for transporting, casting, and gilding the four groups was $300,000. Fraser and Friedlander were each paid $107,000 for their work.

Each granite pedestal is hollow, and open to the bare earth inside. The statues were originally anchored to their pedestals by a steel framework covered in bitumen. Each pedestal has 36 gilded bronze stars spaced equidistantly at the top, which represent the number of states in the United States at the time of the American Civil War. At the front of each pedestal is a classical wreath, designed and carved by Vincent Tonelli (who also co-carved the Trylon of Freedom in front of the E. Barrett Prettyman United States Courthouse). Art curator Susan Menconi said in 1990 that The Arts of War and The Arts of Peace were the largest equestrian sculptures in the United States.

Valor may be entered through a hatch in the rear of the horse, and the interior of the pedestal accessed through the horse's legs for maintenance and repair. The other three statues are accessed through hatches in the top of the pedestals.

=== Critical reception ===
The sculptural groups were not well-received critically when first mounted. As they were being cast, some local citizens felt they would be a poor aesthetic fit with the Lincoln Memorial and unsuccessfully tried to have them moved to another location. Writing in 1955, art critic Charlotte Devree singled out Felix de Weldon's Marine Corps War Memorial and the Fraser and Friedlander statues for harsh critical assessments. She called them "academic cliches" and accused Fraser and Friedlander of "esthetic numbness". The Washington Post also had unkind words for them. The newspaper editorialized that they were created and approved by a "tight little clique of uninspired and not particularly gifted academicians who constitute the National Sculpture Society".

== Conservation and refurbishment ==
=== 1970 repairs ===
By 1970, all four statues were in need of significant repair. A significant amount of the gilding on all four statues no longer adhered to the bronze, as well as exhibiting a large number of cracks and holes. Both of the Fraser pieces were in particularly poor shape, with Music and Harvest more so. National Park Service asked the National Bureau of Standards for advice on what to do. The bureau made five suggestions:

1. Do nothing;
2. Sandblast the gilding off and allowing a natural blue-green oxidized bronze patina to form on the statues;
3. Sandblast the gilding off and paint the statues with gold gilt paint (which would need to be repeated every five years);
4. Clean the surfaces and applying gold leaf rather the gilding to the statues; or
5. Clean the surfaces and then regild them using the brush electroplate technique.

The latter three options required dismounting the sculptures, repairing them, repairing the pedestals, and then remounting the statues.

The National Park Service chose to refinish the statues using brush electroplating. Workers discovered that because the interior of each pedestal was exposed to bare earth, excessive condensation built up inside the hollow statues. Additionally, the statues had not been completely seated on their plinths, and additional moisture worked its way inside through the poorly sealed joint. Extreme temperature changes (due to daytime heating and nighttime cooling of the bronze) and proximity to the river also led to extensive condensation inside the statues. Workers found the interior of each statue damp, even wet, and water pooled in every recess. The moisture build-up created tremendous galvanic corrosion inside the sculptures. The steel joint bolts were so extensively corroded that some had almost completely disintegrated, and many of the steel angle irons were close to failure. National Bureau of Standards workers believed all four statues were on the verge of structural collapse. The corrosion problem was worsened by the presence of gypsum. Gypsum was used to make the molds from which the bronze was cast. But the gypsum was never completely cleaned from the interior of the two The Arts of Peace statues, leading to additional corrosion in these pieces. The corrosion problems were solved by removing the steel bolts and angle irons and replacing them with bronze components, and by cleaning as much gypsum as possible from the statue interiors. More than 1,000 brass bolts were used in Music and Harvest and Aspiration and Literature alone.

The steel anchors holding the statues to the pedestals were also in poor shape. Some of the bitumen flaked off, exposing the bare steel to corrosion and permitting corrosion to occur under the coating. Many of the tie rods were close to structural collapse, and one had completely failed. The steel anchor frames were removed, and brass framing installed.

The castings, too, had problems. Several pieces had cracked, in some cases severely. Music and Harvest had a 6.6-foot (2.0 m) long crack that extended more than halfway around the statue. Welding proved to be an unsatisfactory solution to the cracks because the bronze could not be heated to a temperature high enough to accept welding. Where possible, cracks were filled using a solder composed of 97 percent tin and 3 percent silver. Where the widest cracks occurred, interior straps were applied to help keep the pieces together.

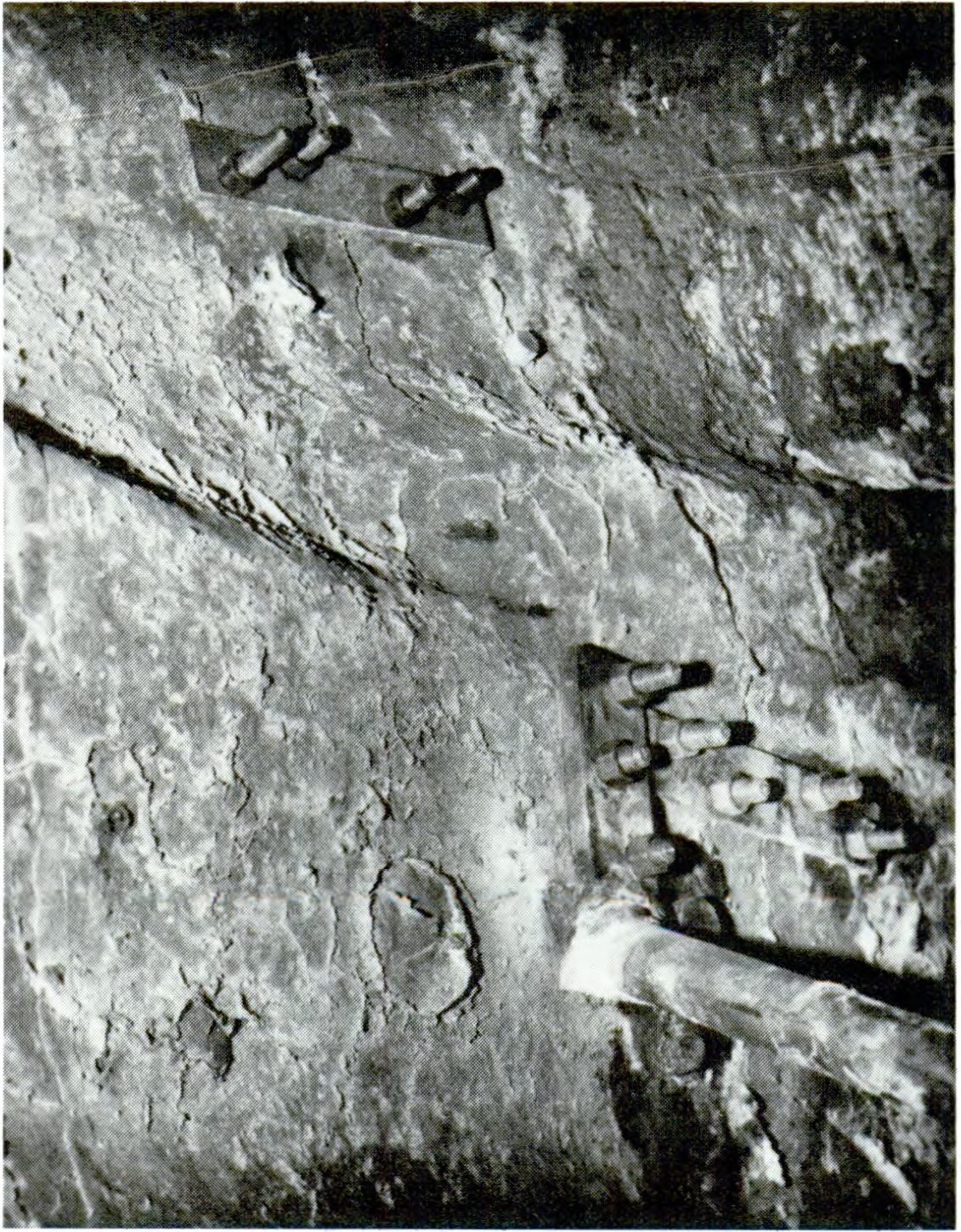
A crack in one of The Arts of Peace statues, repaired with tie-plates and bolts.

Pitting was another problem affecting the castings. When conservators entered the pedestals, they could see hundreds of pinpricks of light and long cracks in the bronze. After sandblasting removed the original gilding, the exterior surface of the bronze was discovered to be full of pits. Few of the pits showed galvanic corrosion, which indicated they were present before the statues were gilded. The two Fraser statues were of the poorest casting quality. The bronze on all four statues was quite porous, allowing water to seep into the metal and cause corrosion. But there were also hundreds of pits dotting the surface of each statue, ranging in size from less than 0.04 inches (1.0 mm) to 0.12 to 0.16 inches (3.0 to 4.1 mm). In some cases, the pits were so deep that they pierced the wall of the statue. The holes and the deepest pits were drilled out and filled with either silver-tin solder or bronze screws (which were then cut off and sanded down). But this left hundreds of small pits which could not be repaired. Gilding them was not feasible, different solution was needed. Once the original gilding was removed, a 500 microinch (12.700 micrometer) nickel coating was applied to the bronze using brush electroplating. Then a 160 microinch (4.0640 micrometer) coating of gold was applied in the same manner. Where there was solder, or in places which were particularly difficult to coat properly, a 393.7 microinch (10.0 micrometer) coating of copper was applied first. An effort was made to building up a nickel and gold coat more thickly over pitted areas. A brand-name lacquer (Incralac), specially formulated for protecting bronze, was then applied to the entire surface. The lacquer was expected to last about five years.

Restoration of Music and Harvest and Aspiration and Literature occurred in the fall of 1971. Valor and Sacrifice were restored beginning in November 1972. The process of sandblasting, repairing, and regilding each pair of statues took 60 days.

Some discoloration of the pedestals and statues occurred after reinstallation. The National Bureau of Standards discovered that dark substance was electroplating solution had not been thoroughly removed. It was washed off, and the problem fixed. Music and Harvest and Aspiration and Literature were inspected 10 months after their restoration. Corrosion was seen developing at several cracks, seams, and small holes, and in some cases gypsum and water migrated out of pores in the bronze to the outside. The smaller corrosion spots were cleaned and relacquered. The larger ones were drilled out, soldered, replated, and relacquered. A second inspection occurred two years later. Only very small corrosion spots were discovered, and these were cleaned and relacquered. After 1974, the refinishing seemed to have worked well and corrosion of the exterior was minimal.

Although the statues were slightly darker than before and exhibited a slight sheen (due to the lacquer), members of the Commission of Fine Arts declared they were satisfied with the results.

=== 1984 and 2005 repairs ===
In 1984, the Teltech company performed a restoration effort on The Arts of War and The Arts of Peace. Local D.C. metallurgist and chemical engineer Joe Mazia assisted with the conservation.

Around 1985, the pedestal of the statue Valor was vandalized. The word "dykes" (a derogatory term for lesbian) was spray-painted onto the granite. The National Park Service attempted to remove the paint with paint stripper, which failed. It then tried arsenic in 2005, which not only failed to remove the paint but also left purple streaks on the granite. Art restorer Gordon Ponsford said he would use a laser to remove the paint. However, the laser did not remove the arsenic stain.

=== 2026 regilding ===
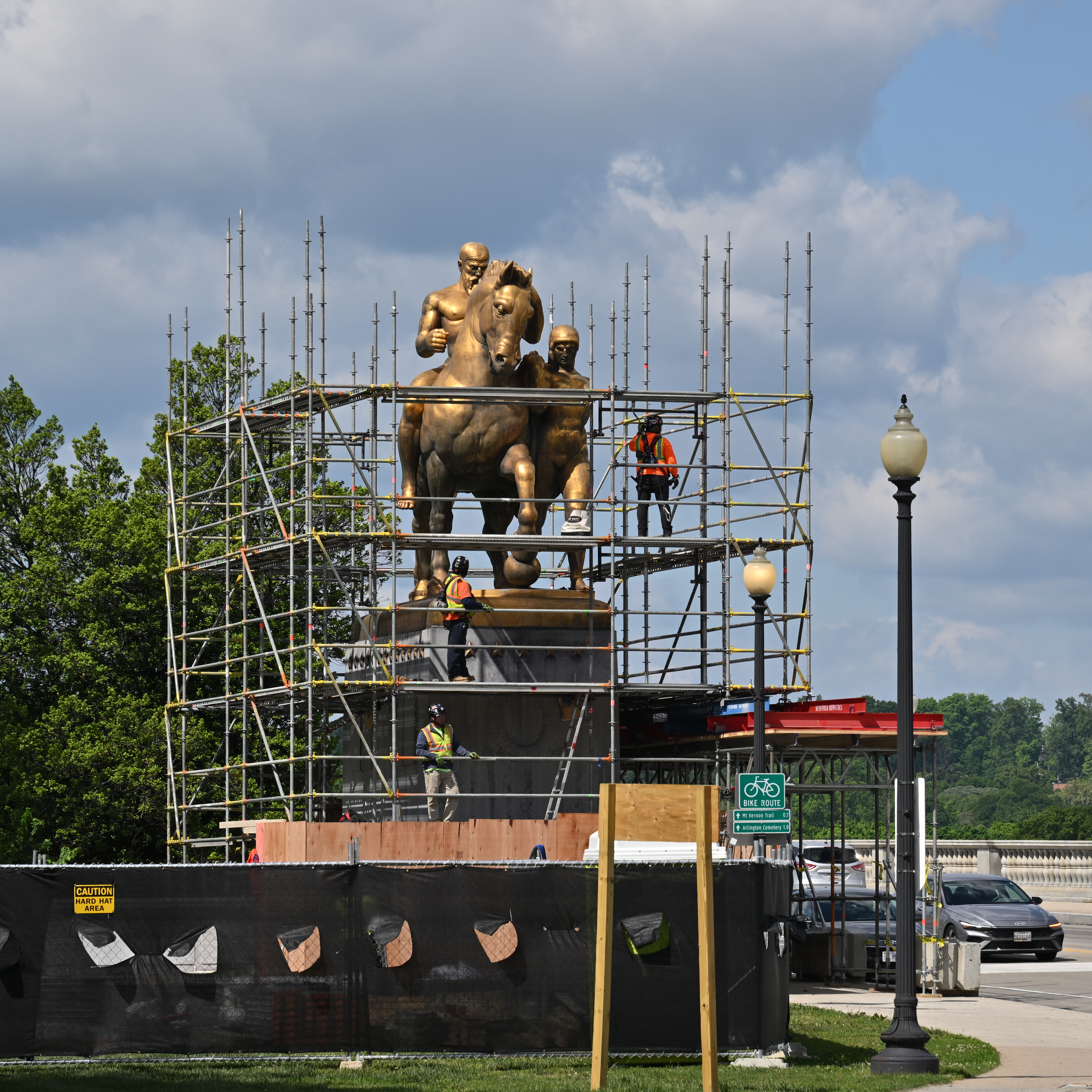
Scaffolding around the Valor statue at the start of the regilding project, April 2026

In 2026, the statues were regilded by order of Interior secretary Doug Burgum as part of President Trump's "effort to make the Nation’s Capital safe and beautiful," the Department of the Interior said in a post on X.

The National Park Service originally estimated the cost at roughly $2.4 million. In April 2026, the government awarded a $5.1 million no-bid contract to Maryland contractor Gilders' Studio to apply 30-gram, 23.75 karat gold leaf to the statues; treat the bronze; and clean and repair the associated granite plinths, all to be completed by July 3. The project and the contract award were made public in June, after work had already begun.

The first half of the project, the Arts of War statues, was completed at the end of July 2026. The work on the Arts of Peace statues was scheduled to be completed by the end of September.

== See also ==
- List of public art in Washington, D.C., Ward 2
- The Offerings of Peace and The Offerings of War

== Bibliography ==
- Abrams, Brett L. Capital Sporting Grounds: A History of Stadium and Ballpark Construction in Washington, D.C. Jefferson, N.C.: McFarland, 2009.
- Bednar, Michael J. L'Enfant's Legacy: Public Open Spaces in Washington, D.C. Baltimore, Md.: Johns Hopkins University Press, 2006.
- Capitman, Barbara Baer; Kinerk, Michael D.; Wilhelm, Dennis W.; and Juster, Randy. Rediscovering Art Deco U.S.A. New York: Viking Studio Books, 1994.
- Carrier, Thomas J. Washington D.C.: A Historical Walking Tour. Charleston, S.C.: Arcadia Publishing, 1999.
- Commission of Fine Arts. Report of the United States Commission of Fine Arts. January 1, 1926 to June 30, 1929. Washington, D.C.: U.S. Government Printing Office, December 5, 1929.
- ——— Report of the United States Commission of Fine Arts. July 1, 1929 to December 31, 1934. Washington, D.C.: U.S. Government Printing Office, June 5, 1935.
- ——— Report of the United States Commission of Fine Arts. January 1, 1935 to December 31, 1939. Washington, D.C.: U.S. Government Printing Office, March 4, 1940.
- ——— Report of the United States Commission of Fine Arts. January 1, 1940 to June 30, 1944. Washington, D.C.: U.S. Government Printing Office, June 1, 1944.
- ——— Report of the United States Commission of Fine Arts. July 1, 1944 to June 30, 1948. Washington, D.C.: U.S. Government Printing Office, May 27, 1948.
- ——— Report of the United States Commission of Fine Arts. July 1, 1948 to June 30, 1954. Washington, D.C.: U.S. Government Printing Office, August 5, 1959.
- Devree, Charlotte. "Is This Statuary Worth More Than A Million of Your Money?" ARTNews. April 1955, p. 34–37, 67.
- Freundlich, August L. The Sculpture of James Earle Fraser. Parkland, Fla.: Universal Publishers, 2001.
- Goode, James M. Washington Sculpture: A Cultural History of Outdoor Sculpture in the Nation's Capital. Baltimore, Md.: Johns Hopkins University Press, 2009.
- Gutheim, Frederick A. and Lee, Antoinette J. Worthy of the Nation: Washington, D.C., From L'Enfant to the National Capital Planning Commission. Baltimore, Md.: Johns Hopkins University Press, 2006.
- Horne, Robert C. "Bridges Across the Potomac." Records of the Columbia Historical Society. 53/56 (1953/1956): 249–258.
- Kohler, Sue A. The Commission of Fine Arts: A Brief History, 1910–1995. Washington, D.C.: U.S. Commission of Fine Arts, 1996.
- LeLoup, Lance T. Parties, Rules, and the Evolution of Congressional Budgeting. Columbus, Ohio: Ohio State University Press, 2005.
- Menconi, Susan E. Primary Models: American Plasters, 1880–1945. New York: Hirschl & Adler Galleries, 1990.
- Molinari, Luca and Canepari, Andrea. The Italian Legacy in Washington, D.C.: Architecture, Design, Art and Culture. Milan: Skira, 2007.
- Moore, John E. and Jackson, Julia A. Geology, Hydrology, and History of the Washington, D.C., Area. Alexandria, Va.: American Geological Institute, 1989.
- Myer, Donald Beekman. "Unbuilt Bridges of Washington, D.C." Records of the Columbia Historical Society. 49 (1973/1974): 137–150.
- National Park Service. National Capital Parks. Washington, D.C.: U.S. Government Printing Office, 1963.
- Office of Conservation, Interpretation, and Use. Scientific Report. National Capital Region. National Park Service. U.S. Department of the Interior. Washington, D.C.: U.S. Government Printing Office, 1965.
- Office of Public Buildings and Public Parks of the National Capital. Annual Report of the Director of Public Buildings and Public Parks of the National Capital. Washington, D.C.: Government Printing Office, 1929.
- ——— Annual Report of the Director of Public Buildings and Public Parks of the National Capital. Washington, D.C.: Government Printing Office, 1930.
- Ogburn, Fielding; Passaglia, Elio; Burnett, Harry C.; Kruger, Jerome; and Pickelsimer, Marion L. "Restoration of Large Gilded Statues Using Various Electrochemical and Metallurgical Techniques." In Corrosion and Metal Artifacts: A Dialogue Between Conservators and Archaeologists and Corrosion Scientists. National Bureau of Standards Special Publication 479. Code XNBSAV. Benjamin Floyd Brown, et al., eds. Washington, D.C.: U.S. Government Printing Office, 1977.
- Passaglia, Elio. "Solution of an Art Restoration Problem." In Success By Design: Progress Through Failure Analysis: Proceedings of the 21st Meeting of the Mechanical Failures Prevention Group. T.R. Shives and William A. Willard, eds. Washington, D.C.: National Bureau of Standards, 1976.
- Rogers, Millard F. Sketches and Bozzetti by American Sculptors, 1880–1950. Cincinnati, Ohio: Cincinnati Art Museum, 1987.
- Rosenkranz, Joel. Sculpture on a Grand Scale: Works From the Studio of Leo Friedlander. Yonkers, New York: The Hudson River Museum of Westchester, 1984.
- Scott, Pamela. "'A City Designed As A Work of Art': The Emergence of the Senate Park Commission's Monumental Core." In Designing the Nation's Capital: The 1901 Plan for Washington, D.C. Sue A. Kohler and Pamela Scott, eds. Washington, D.C.: U.S. Commission of Fine Arts, 2006.
- Scott, Pamela and Lee, Antoinette Josephine. Buildings of the District of Columbia. Oxford, U.K.: Oxford University Press, 1993.
- Sherrill, C.O. First Deficiency Appropriation Bill, 1922. Hearings Before the Subcommittee of the Committee on Appropriations on H.R. 9237. Subcommittee on Appropriations. Committee on Appropriations. U.S. Senate. 67th Cong., 2d sess. Washington, D.C.: Government Printing Office, 1921.
- Taylor, Joshua Charles. The Fine Arts in America. Chicago: University of Chicago Press, 1979.
- Tindall, William. Standard History of the City of Washington From a Study of the Original Sources. Knoxville, Tenn.: H.W. Crew & Co., 1914.
- Ziolkowski, John E. Classical Influence on the Public Architecture of Washington and Paris: A Comparison of Two Capital Cities. New York: Peter Lang Publishing, 1988.
