= Arnaldo Pomodoro =

Italian sculptor (1926–2025)

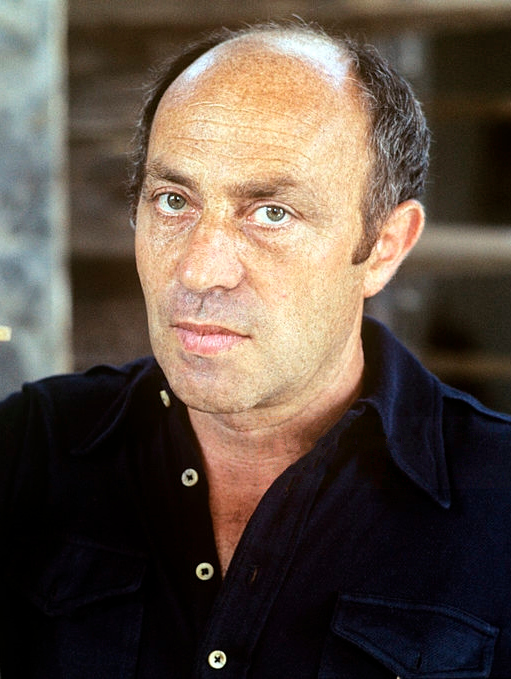
- Pomodoro in 1975
- Born: 23 June 1926; Morciano, Italy
- Died: 22 June 2025 (aged 98); Milan, Italy
- Occupation: Sculptor
- Notable work: Sphere Within Sphere
- Relatives: Giò Pomodoro (brother)
- Awards: Praemium Imperiale

Arnaldo Pomodoro (23 June 1926 – 22 June 2025) was an Italian sculptor based in Milan. His signature works are Sphere Within Sphere (Sfera con Sfera), bronze spheres with smooth exterior and broken interiors. They are displayed in public spaces such as the United Nations Headquarters, the University of California, Berkeley, Trinity College Dublin, the Hirshhorn Museum and Sculpture Garden in Washington, D.C., Tel Aviv University in Israel and at the Vatican Museums.

== Life and career ==
=== Early life ===
Arnaldo Pomodoro was born in Morciano, Romagna, in the Montefeltro area, on 23 June 1926. His father worked in various jobs and also wrote poetry; his mother worked as a dressmaker. He would have liked to become an architect or a scenic designer, but received a diploma from the Technical Institute for Surveyors in Rimini and also trained there as a goldsmith. He worked at the public works office in Pesaro as an advisor for the restoration of historic buildings damaged in World War II, and as a goldsmith. He attended the Art Institute in Rimini to study scenic design.

=== 1950s–60s ===
In 1953, Pomodoro attended an exhibition of Picasso which was held in Milan at the Palazzo Reale, showing Guernica. It made a strong impression on him, and a year later he moved to Milan where he joined the artistic community and became friends with Lucio Fontana, Dangelo, Sanesi, Enrico Baj, and others. He experimented with objects in jewelry-style, with overlays in silver and gold. His artworks were first presented at the Galleria Numero of Florence and Galleria Montenapoleone of Milan. In 1955, his first sculpture was exhibited at Galleria del Naviglio of Milan. He took part in the 10th Triennale in Milan, and together with his brother Giò he also participated in the 1956 Venice Biennale, earning him his first international recognition.

Pomodoro received a grant to study American art, and traveled to the United States in 1959. He described his visit to MoMA and seeing Brancusi's sculptures as a strong inspiration for his work. In San Francisco, he met Mark Rothko who was teaching at the California School of Fine Arts. In New York, Pomodoro met Costantino Nivola and Enrico Donati who introduced him to such artists as Franz Kline, Jasper Johns, Andy Warhol, and others. He also met sculptors David Smith and Louise Nevelson, and organized an exhibition New Work from Italy, dedicated to Italian artists.

In the 1960s, Pomodoro began to create larger pieces in geometric shapes such as cubes and triangles. Some reviewers saw them as buildings stripped of facades by bombings. He developed a collaboration with the Marlborough Gallery in New York. In 1963, Pomodoro received the International Prize for Sculpture at the VII São Paulo Biennale and also the National Prize for Sculpture at the XXXII Venice Biennale in 1964. Pomodoro arrived at spheres covered partly with a polished bronze; the Museum of Modern Art bought his Sphere, I in 1964. In 1966, he became an artist in residence at Stanford University, and then at UC Berkeley and Mills College. He created the Sfera grande for the Italian Pavilion at the 1967 Montreal Expo, beginning his project of monumental spheres. This sculpture is now located in front of the Farnesina Palace in Rome. He was awarded the International Prize for Sculpture from the Carnegie Institute in Pittsburgh in 1967.

=== 1970s–80s ===
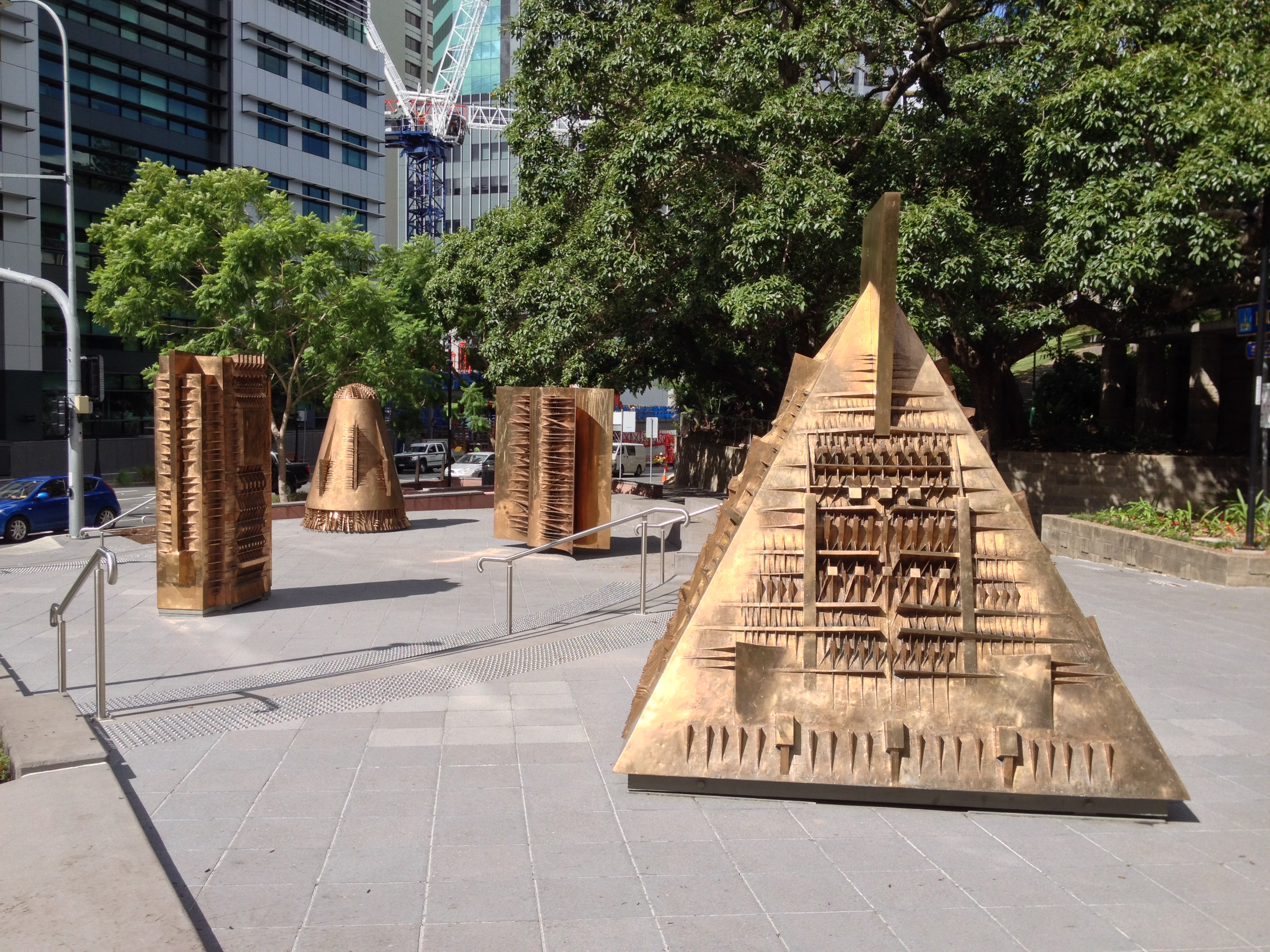
Forme del Mito in Brisbane

In 1972, Arnaldo Pomodoro returned to set design, and worked on Kleist's play Das Käthchen von Heilbronn staged in Zurich. In 1984, he had a large retrospective exhibition at the Forte di Belvedere in Florence. In 1988, Pomodoro participated in the Venice Biennale as well as the international exhibition of sculpture at the World Expo in Brisbane. His work Forme del Mito (Forms of Myth) which was displayed at the Expo, was later purchased by Brisbane City Council for the City of Brisbane.

=== 1990s–2025 ===
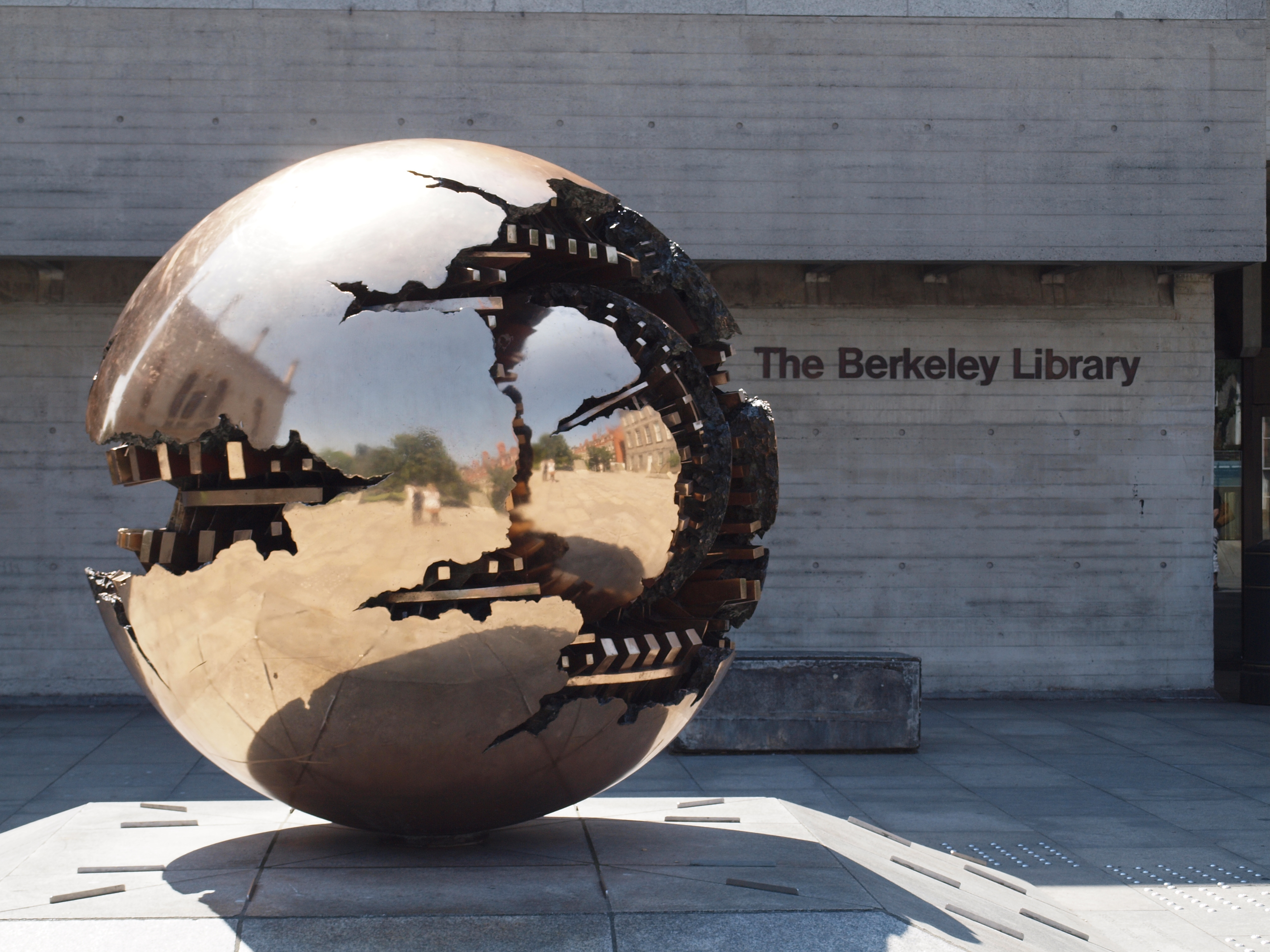
Sfera con Sfera, The Berkeley Library, Trinity College, Dublin

In 1990, Pomodoro received the Praemium Imperiale for Sculpture from the Japan Art Association. His work Sfera con Sfera was installed in the Cortile della Pigna of the Vatican Museums. Works of this title became his recognisable signature works, massive bronze spheres with a shiny and smooth exterior and broken interiors that he compared to a superficial perfection of exteriors and the troubled complexity of interiors. The Vatican sphere features a mechanism responding to the wind. In 1992, he was awarded an honorary doctorate by Trinity College in Dublin when a Sfera con Sfera was installed. The following year he was nominated the honorary member of the Brera Academy in Milan.

In 1995, the Fondazione Arnaldo Pomodoro was created as a cultural and exhibition center dedicated to contemporary art. Originally conceived as a centre to document and archive the work of the artist, it opened an exhibition space in 2005, hosting exhibitions of prominent artists such as Jannis Kounellis, Lucio Fontana, and Robert Rauschenberg.

In 1996, a Sfera con Sfera was installed at the United Nations Headquarters, gifted by Italy as a reference to a new millennium. Its outer shell is breaking open "as if the inner sphere is hatching", described by the artist as a "promise for the rebirth of a less troubled and destructive world". Pomodoro was awarded the Knight of the Great Cross of the Italian Republic (Cavaliere di gran croce dell'Ordine al merito della Repubblica italiana).

In 2002, he designed a controversial fiberglass crucifix for the Cathedral of St. John the Evangelist in Milwaukee, Wisconsin. The piece is topped with a four-and-a-half-meter diameter crown of thorns which hovers over the figure of Christ. In 2007–2008, his designs were a source of inspiration for the redesign of Rai International, under the new name Raitalia, effective 30 March 2008.

In 2014–15, Pomodoro finished one of his fundamental works – the Pietrarubbia Group, which was started in 1975. He then explained the idea behind this project:

In the early 1970s, on the advice of some Pesaro friends, I visited Pietrarubbia, a small town in Montefeltro between the Marche and Romagna, which had been built, according to legend, in 980. At that time, the village was almost completely abandoned. I realized that somehow it had to be born again: and how, if not through the participation of artists? I had to kick it off. So, I had the idea of dedicating one of my works to Pietrarubbia and I planned a series of sculptures as a cycle. The Pietrarubbia Group was born, a work "in progress", a space defined by a series of sculptures – in fact, a space that became all sculpture – in which certain values are given meaning, certain historical values, in the sense that history is always the same… In short, I would like that anyone who sees this work could read within it the very spirit that comes from the Middle Ages: the gate that rises, the drawbridge, the foundation, the gate that opens and closes and can also be seen as a negative and positive book...

Pomodoro was still active as of 2024 and exhibited recent work that year at his gallery, the Cortesi Gallery in Milan. Some of his Sphere Within Sphere (Sfera con Sfera) are on display at the public spaces including the Mt. Sinai Hospital in New York City, the Hirshhorn Museum and Sculpture Garden in Washington, D.C., Christian Theological Seminary in Indianapolis, the de Young Museum in San Francisco, Tehran Museum of Contemporary Art, American Republic Insurance Company in Des Moines, Iowa, the Columbus Museum of Art in Columbus, Ohio, the west entrance to the University of California, Berkeley campus, the Virginia Museum of Fine Arts in Richmond, Virginia, the Stanford University sculpture garden, the Donald M. Kendall Sculpture Gardens in Purchase, New York, and the Tel Aviv University, Israel.

== Personal life and death ==
Pomodoro lived and worked in Milan, where he collaborated with his brother, Giò Pomodoro.

Pomodoro died aged 98, at his home in Milan, on 22 June 2025, the day before his 99th birthday.

== Quotes ==
On Form and Movement:

According to me, sculpture must be projected into space in order to remove, as far as possible, the weight from the material and the work's fixed base. I have always tried to express movement as an intensification of a condition of imbalance in order to create a striking contrast to any stasis or any reached or predictable order.

— Arnaldo Pomodoro

== Set designs for theatre and opera ==
Designs by Pomodoro for operas and plays included:

- Semiramide by Rossini (1982), Teatro dell'Opera di Roma
- Orestea di Gibellina by Emilio Isgrò on a text by Eschilo (1983–1985), Teatro Massimo, Palermo
- Didone by Christopher Marlowe (1986)
- Alceste by Gluck (1987), Teatro Carlo Felice in Genoa – stage and costumes
- Oedipus rex by Stravinsky (1988), Siena
- La Passione di Cleopatra by Ahmad Shawqi, an Egyptian poet (1989)
- I Paraventi by Genet (1990), Teatro Comunale di Bologna – stage and costumes
- Nella solitudine dei campi di cotone by Bernard-Marie Koltès (1992)
- Più grandiose dimore by Eugene O'Neill (1993)
- Oreste di Vittorio Alfieri (1993)
- Stabat Mater, La passione secondo Giovanni and Vespro della Beata Vergine by Antonio Tarantino (1994–1995)
- Moonlight by Pinter (1995)
- Plays of the Sea by Eugene O'Neill (1996)
- Antigone by Jean Anouilh (1996)
- Tempesta (The Tempest) by Shakespeare (1998) – stage and costumes
- Madama Butterfly by Puccini (2004), Festival Puccini in Torre del Lago
- Un ballo in maschera by Verdi (2005), Leipzig Opera – stage and costumes
- Teneke by Fabio Vacchi (2007), La Scala in Milan – stage and costumes

== Honours and awards ==
- International Prize for Sculpture, VII São Paulo Biennale, 1963
- National Prize for Sculpture, XXXII Venice Biennale, 1964
- International Prize for Sculpture, Carnegie Institute, 1967
- Praemium Imperiale for Sculpture, Japan Art Association, 1990
- Honorary degree in literature, Trinity College, 1992
- The Knight of the Great Cross of the Italian Republic, 1996
- International Sculpture Center's Lifetime Achievement in Contemporary Sculpture Award, 2008.

== Gallery ==
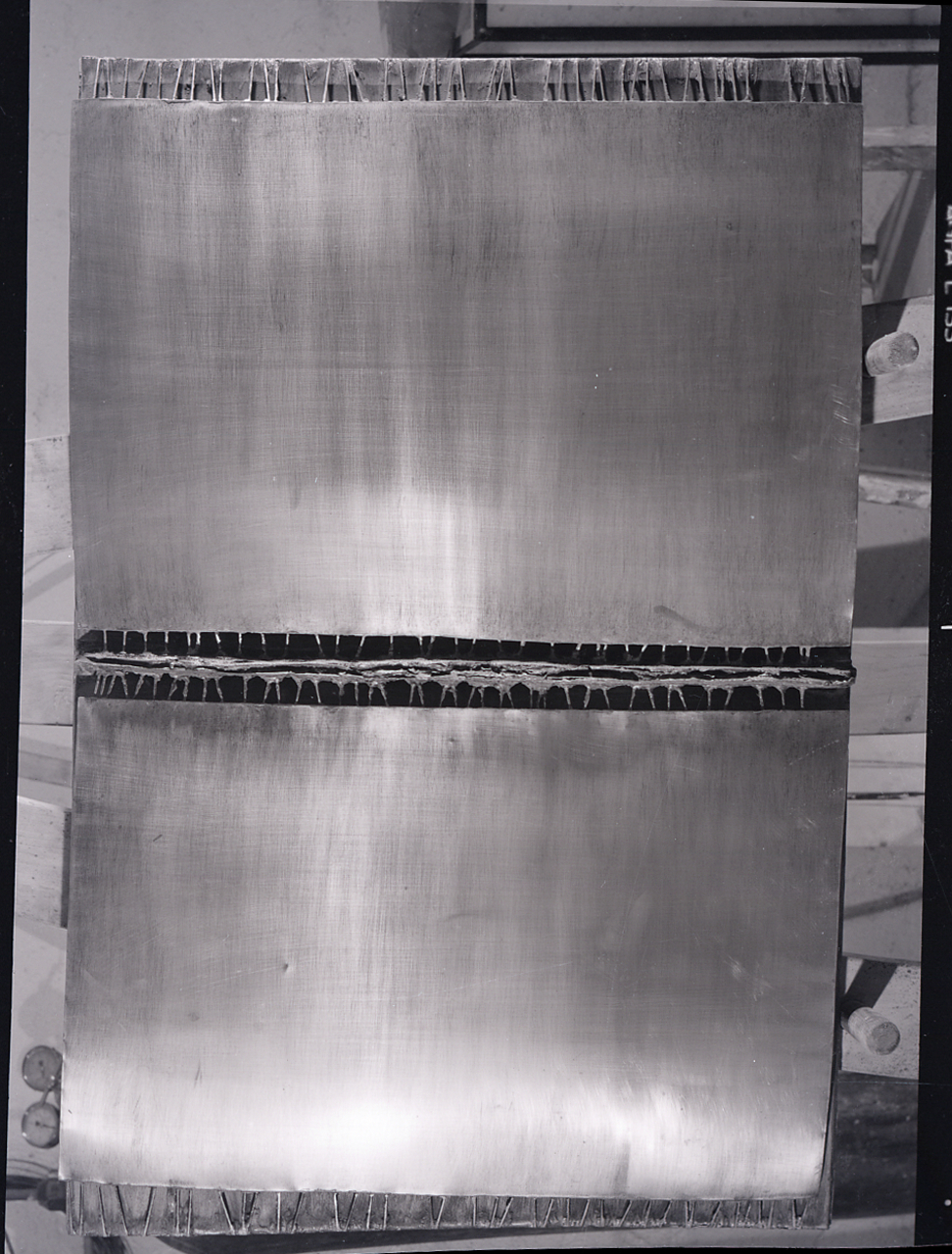
by Pomodoro, 1965

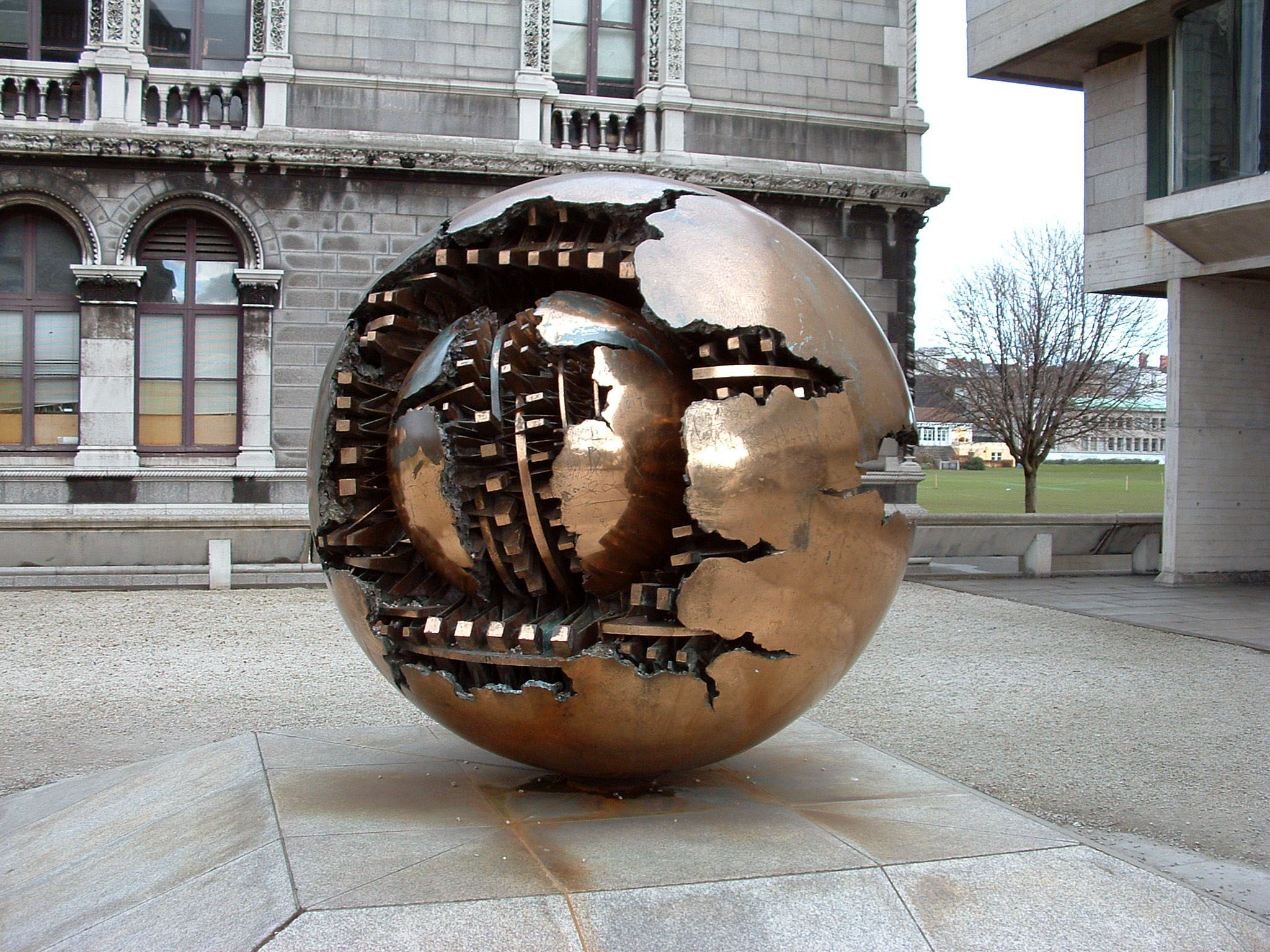
Sphere Within Sphere in Trinity College, Dublin

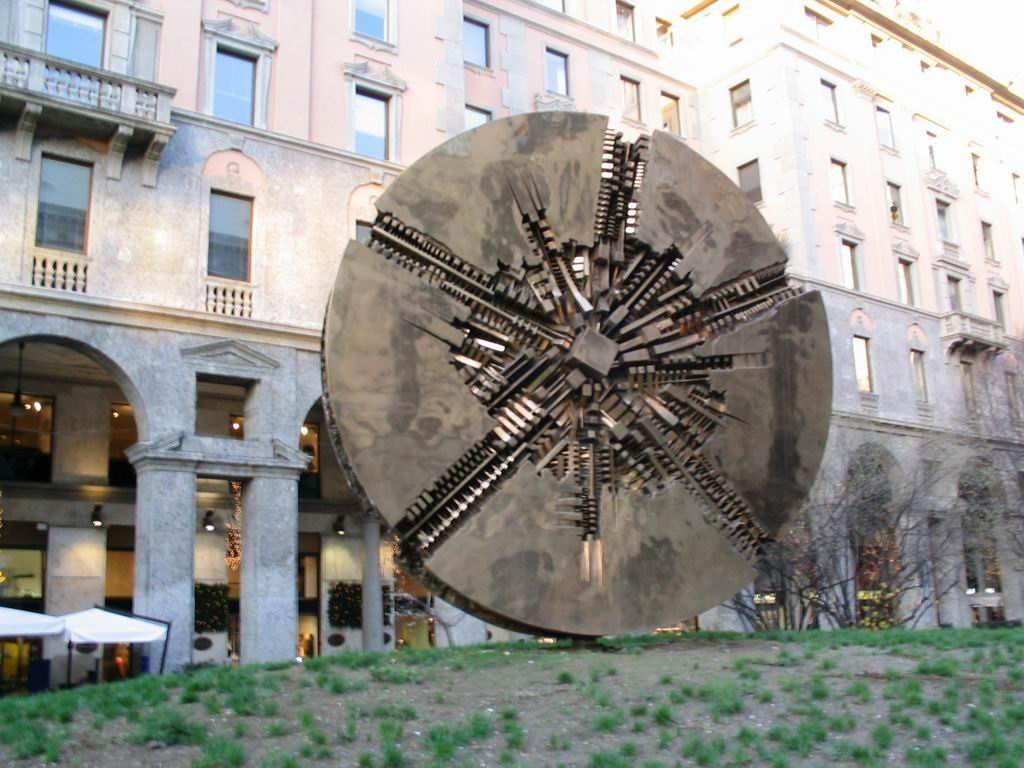
Great disc, Milano

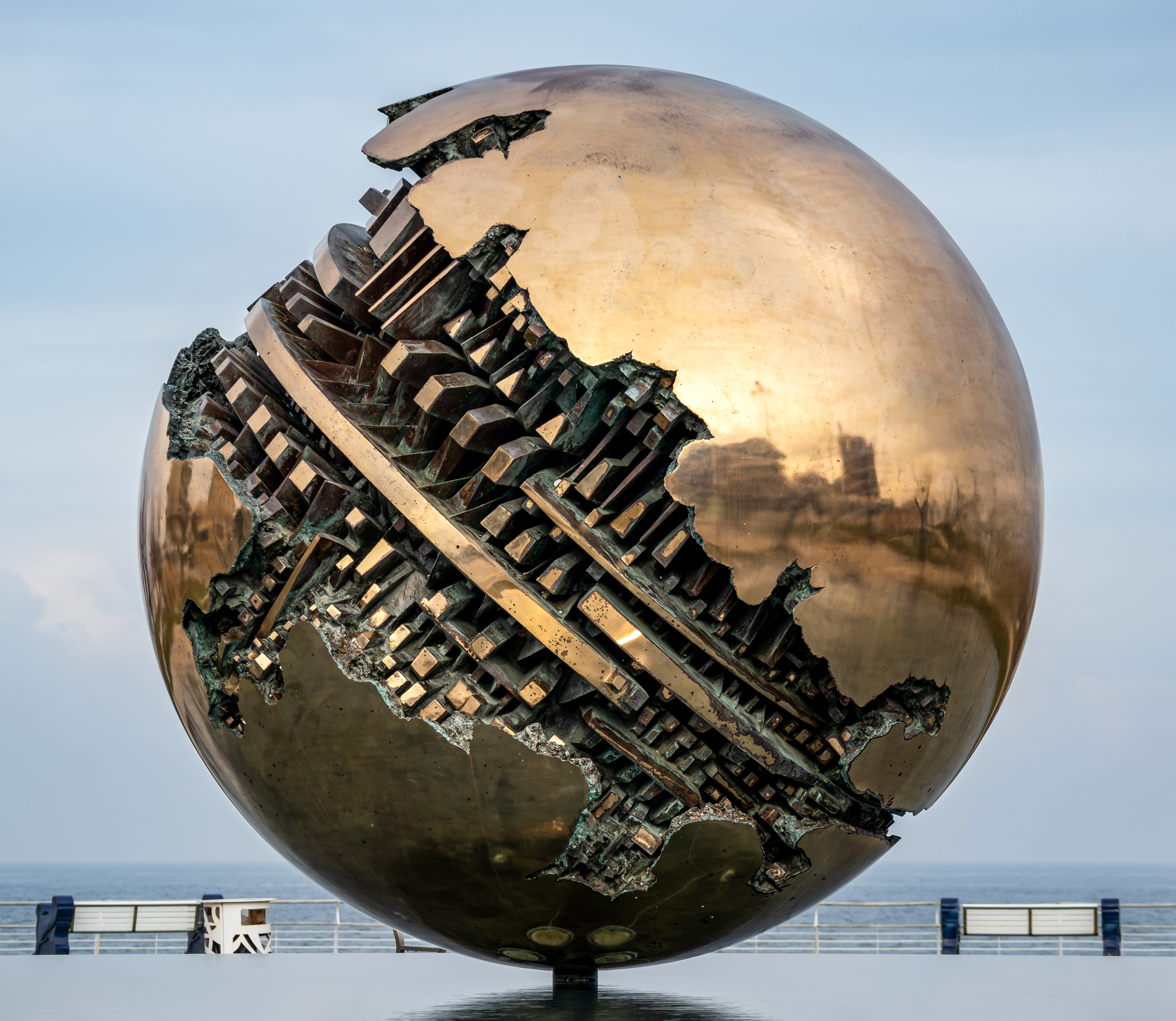
Sfera grande, Pesaro Italy
