= Sphere Within Sphere =

Sculpture by Arnaldo Pomodoro, of which several versions exist

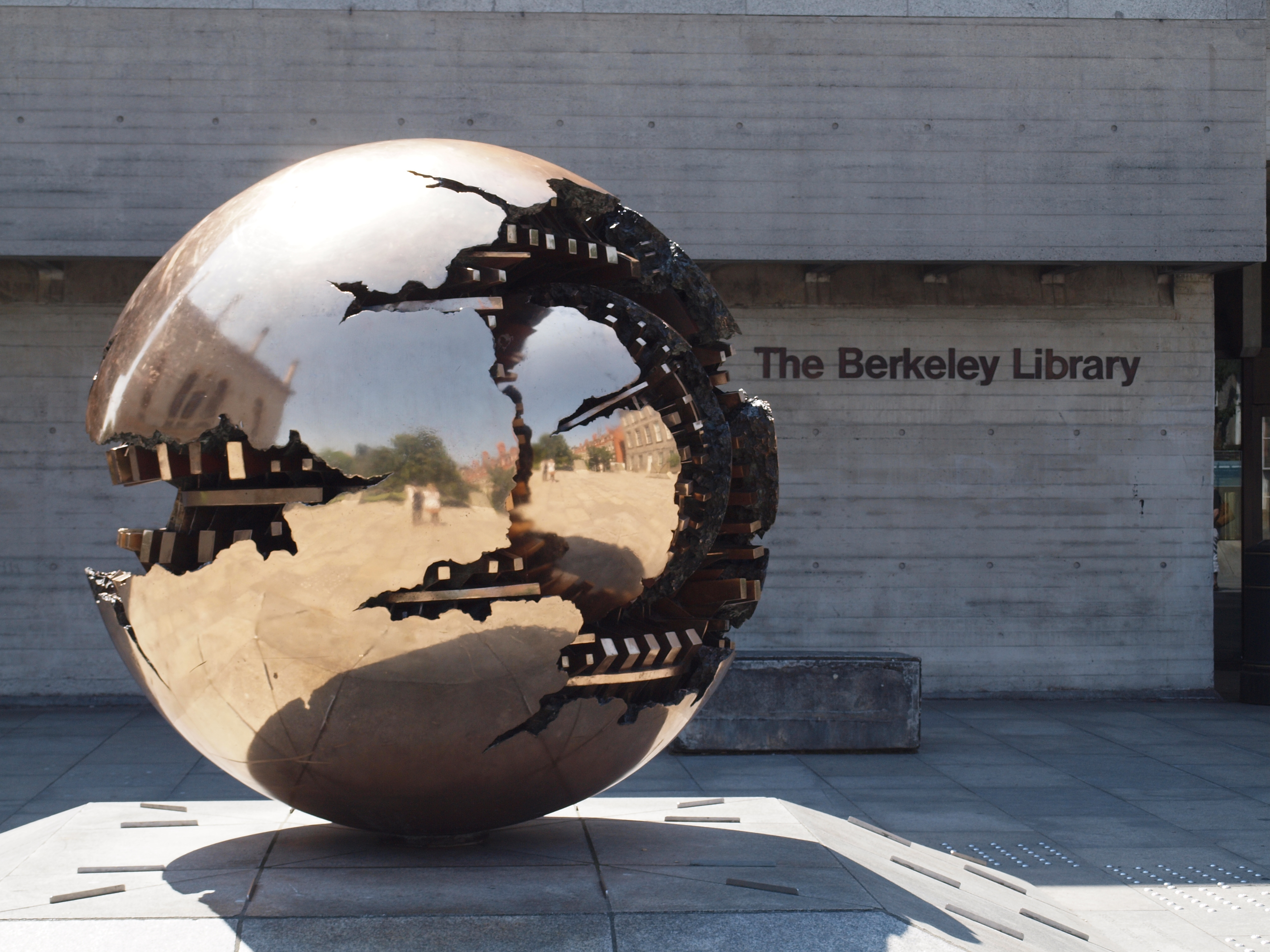
Sfera con Sfera, Trinity College, Dublin

Sphere Within Sphere (Sfera con sfera) describes a series of spherical bronze sculptures by Italian sculptor Arnaldo Pomodoro. In 1966, Pomodoro was commissioned to create a 3.5-meter sphere for Expo 67 in Montreal. The success of this sculpture propelled Pomodoro's works into the mainstream, allowing for commissions that would land his sculptures at the Headquarters of the United Nations and the Vatican Museums.

Over his career, Pomodoro created 45 of these popular sculptures, aptly named Rotante, Sphera, or Sphera con sphera. The spheres range in size from as small as half a meter up to 4 meters in diameter. They are meant to represent the 'ideal city,' with contrasting imagery of organic and human shapes combined with technological and gear-like components. The spheres can be seen as a promising rebirth of a less troubled and destructive world. Pomodoro described his desire for building these sculptures, stating, "breaking these perfect, magic forms in order to reveal their internal ferment, mysterious and alive, monstrous and yet pure; I [want to] create a discordant tension, a conflict, with the polished shine: a unity composed of incompleteness."

== Locations ==
Versions of the sculpture can be found around the world, including:.

=== Europe ===
- Italy:
  - Milan:
    - Cimitero Monumentale
    - Gallerie di Piazza Scala
    - Museo del Novecento
    - Milano Santa Giulia
    - Mario Negri Institute for Pharmacological Research
  - Parma: Collezione Barilla di Arte Moderna
  - Verona: Byblos Art Hotel
  - Venice: Peggy Guggenheim Collection
  - Trieste: Museo Revoltella
  - Florence: Direzione Regionale di Intesa Sanpaolo
  - Pesaro: Piazzale della Libertà
  - Gubbio: Park hotel ai Cappuccini
  - Rome:
    - Ministry of Foreign Affairs (Italy)
    - Galleria Nazionale d'Arte Moderna
    - Hotel Palazzo Ripetta
    - Hilton Rome Airport
- Vatican City: Vatican Museums
- Dublin: Eavan Boland Library
- Rotterdam: Museum Boijmans Van Beuningen
- Monaco: Quai Jean-Charles Ray
- Warsaw: Royal Lazienki Museum
- The Hague<ref><https://www.flickr.com/photos/piet_musterd/4865581766//ref>: central hall of the ministries of Social Affairs and Work and Health, Welfare and Sports

=== United States ===
- Berkeley, California: Berkeley Art Museum and Pacific Film Archive
- San Francisco: De Young Museum
- San Diego: The San Diego Museum of Art
- Dallas, Texas: Dallas Museum of Art
- Des Moines, Iowa: Wellabee Headquarters Building
- Milwaukee, Wisconsin: Milwaukee Art Museum
- Chicago, Illinois: Art Institute of Chicago
- Indianapolis, Indiana: Christian Theological Seminary
  - Columbus, Ohio: Columbus Museum of Art
- Richmond, Virginia: Virginia Museum of Fine Arts
- Washington, DC: Hirshhorn Museum and Sculpture Garden
- Princeton, New Jersey: Princeton University Art Museum
- New York City:
  - Mount Sinai Hospital (Manhattan)
  - Museum of Modern Art
  - United Nations Plaza
- Worcester, Massachusetts: Worcester Art Museum

=== Middle East ===
- Tel Aviv: Tel Aviv University
- Jeddah: Jeddah Sculpture Museum
- Tehran: Tehran Museum of Contemporary Art

=== Japan ===
- Miyazaki: Miyazaki Prefectural Art Museum
- Hiroshima: Fukuyama Museum of Art
- Kanagawa:
  - The Hakone Open-Air Museum
  - Amada Co., Ltd.
- Hokkaido: Kushiro City Museum
