= Angela Valamanesh =

Australian artist

- Born: Angela Carter; Port Pirie
- Education: South Australian School of Art; Glasgow School of Art
- Style: mixed media sculpture
- Awards: Anne & Gordon Samstag International Visual Arts Scholarship

Angela Louise Valamanesh AM (née Carter; born 1953) is an Australian visual artist, especially known for her ceramic art and sculpture that are based on forms found in the natural world. Based in Adelaide, South Australia, she is also known for her past large-scale public art collaborations with her husband Hossein Valamanesh. Her work has been represented in several solo exhibitions and many group exhibitions, and are held in public and private collections around the world.

== Early life and education ==
Angela Louise Valamanesh, was born as Angela Carter in Port Pirie, South Australia, in 1953.

She graduated from the South Australian School of Art in 1977 with a Diploma in Design (Ceramics).

In 1993 she received an MA in Visual Arts from the University of South Australia (UniSA).

In 2012 Valamanesh completed a studio-based PhD, "focusing on early scientific illustrations drawn with the use of microscopes".

== Art practice and career ==
Based in Adelaide, South Australia, Valamanesh started out focusing on ceramics, but expanded into mixed media and sculptural objects. The 1995 exhibition Birds have fled, at UniSA, was her first major exhibition as an artist, and featured art installations.

While at the Glasgow School of Art in 1997, she created For a Long While There Were Only Plants, in which her love of shape and form became apparent, particularly those with their origins in biology.

She works in many different mediums. Her practice focuses on nature as well as the associations between art and science, and is often based on research she has undertaken during various residencies. She is fascinated by scientific illustrations, and her artworks often make reference to scientific specimens of plant, humans and animals.

In her early ceramics, Valamanesh used unglazed ceramics in earthy tones, reflecting the natural colours of the clays used. her 2000 series About Being Here (also the title of a 2009 book by Cath Kenneally), Later, in the 2017 series Insect/Orchid, which was inspired by the botanical illustrations of Rosa Fiveash, she uses darker tones and gloss glazes to create her "oversized biomorphic creatures", which represent a cross between an orchid and a beetle. Other series by Valamanesh include her Natural History Collection and A Little Bit of Everything series, the latter consisting of 11 wall-mounted works in pale plaster.

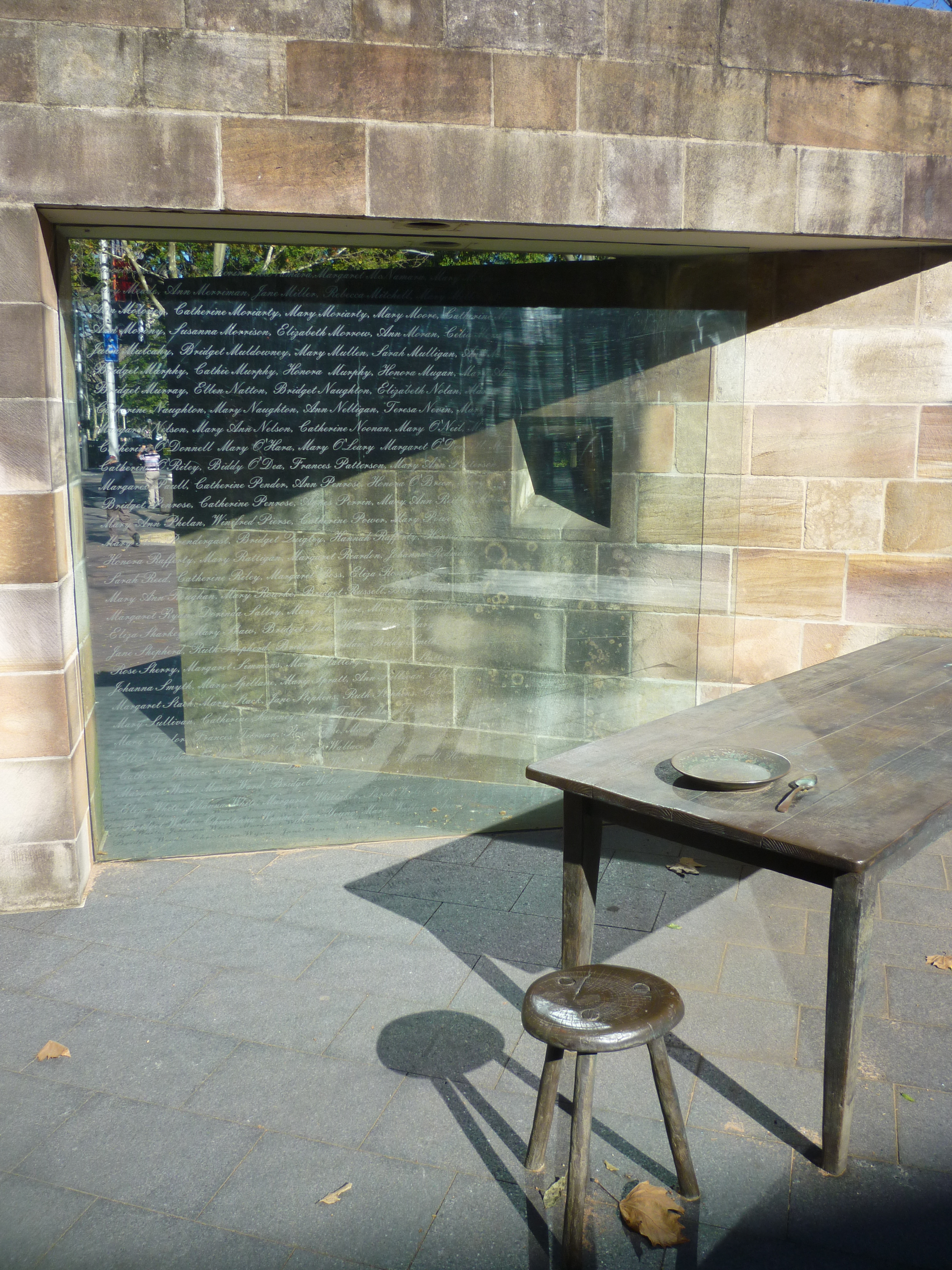
Australian Monument to the Great Irish Famine at Hyde Park Barracks, Sydney

She has also created watercolour paintings, including a series called Observations (2009–19), which she started while doing her doctorate at the University of Adelaide, inspired by discoveries of early botanist Nehemiah Grew and natural philosopher Robert Hooke. She has also worked in fabric and film, including a video collaboration with her husband, Hossein Valamanesh (1949–2022). What Remains in 2012.

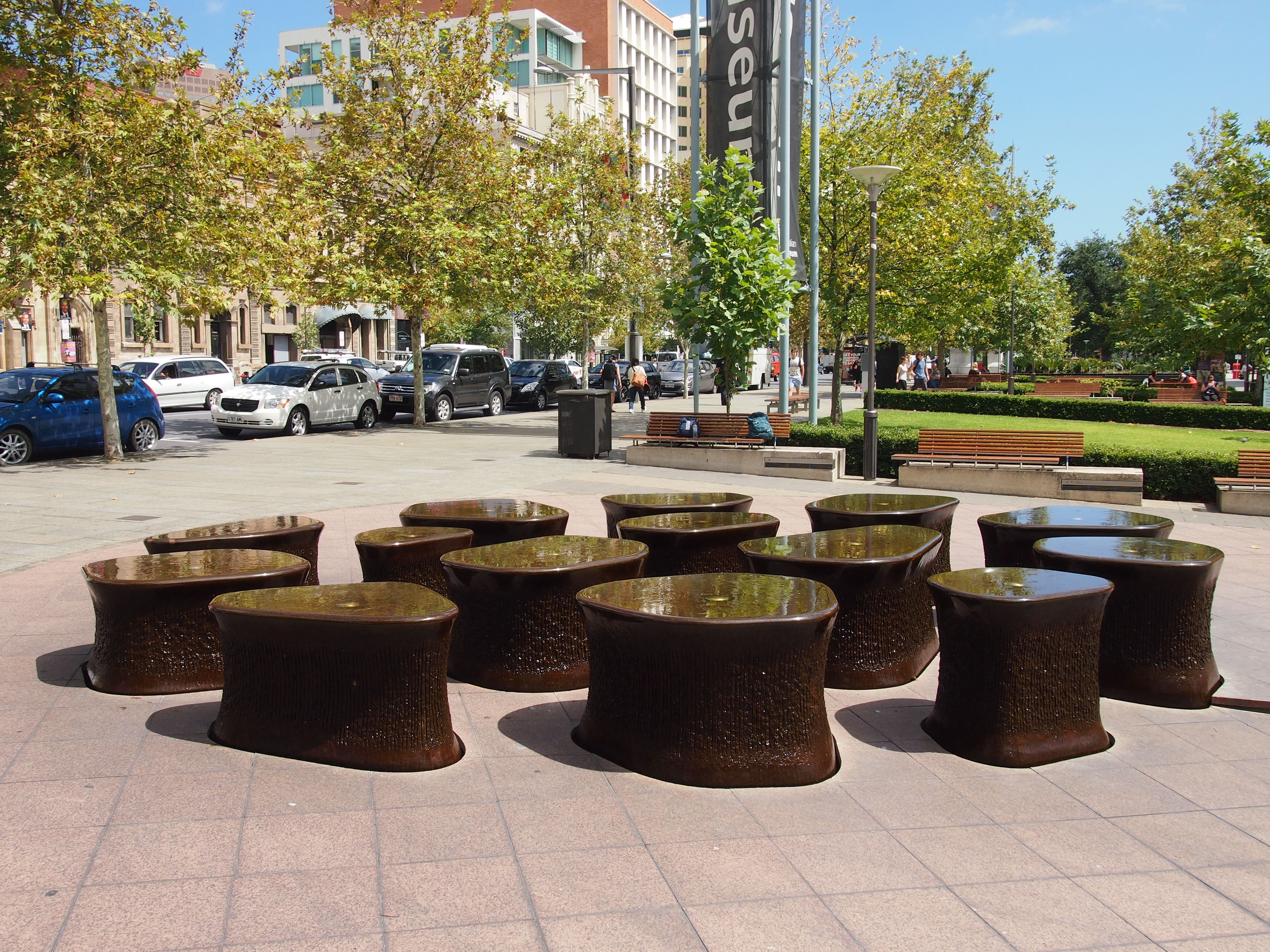
14 Pieces (2005) by Angela and Hossein Valamanesh, in front of the South Australian Museum

She is also known for her large-scale public art collaborations with her husband Hossein. Among the commissions completed with Hossein are:

- 1992-3: Garden of Memories, Pennington, South Australia
- 1997: Australian Monument to the Great Irish Famine (An Gorta Mor), Hyde Park Barracks, Sydney
- 2005: 14 Pieces, in front of the South Australian Museum on North Terrace, Adelaide
- 2011: Ginkgo Gate, Adelaide Botanic Garden

== Other activities ==
In 1994, Valamanesh lectured in ceramics part-time at the North Adelaide School of Arts From 1995-96 she was a part-time tutor at the Faculty of Aboriginal & Islander Studies at UniSA, and from 1995-98 part-time lecturer in Visual Arts Studies, at UniSA

From 2010 until 2013 Valamanesh was a member of the Visual Arts Board of the Australia Council for the Arts.

== Recognition and honours ==
- 1996–7: Anne & Gordon Samstag International Visual Arts Scholarship, which gave her a residency at Glasgow School of Art for a year in their MFA programme
- 2000: Artist in residence, JamFactory Ceramics Workshops, Adelaide
- 2003: Artist in residence, Bundanon art museum, New South Wales
- 2005: Artist in residence, Sydney Grammar School
- 2006: Artist in residence, Canberra School of Art, Australian National University
- 2010: Member of the Order of Australia, for "service to the visual arts as a ceramicist and sculptor"
- 2014: Residency at Smithsonian Institution, Washington, D.C.
- 2017: Residency at the Barr Smith Library's Rare Books Collection at the University of Adelaide
- 2024(?): Mordant Family / Creative Australia Affiliated Fellowship in Rome, Italy
- 2024: Bettison & James Award, at the 2024 Adelaide Film Festival, awarded 17 September

== Exhibitions ==
=== Selected solo exhibitions ===
- 1995: Angela Valamanesh: birds have fled, at University of South Australia Art Museum, Underdale, South Australia
- 1996: Calculations: Angela Valamanesh, at Contemporary Art Centre of South Australia, Adelaide
- 2019: Angela Valamanesh: About Being Here, a retrospective survey at the JamFactory in Adelaide in its Icon series; a featured exhibition in SALA, before touring nationally until 2022
- 2021: The Mortician's Garden, at Gallery Sally Dan-Cuthbert in Sydney; also included in the 2022 AGSA Biennial

=== Selected group exhibitions ===
- 1994: Artist Windows, Adelaide Fringe
- 1998: Contemporary International Ceramics, Sybaris Gallery, Michigan, US
- 2002: Less is More, Less is Bore, Brisbane City Gallery
- 2008: Sidney Myer Fund International Ceramic Award, Shepparton Art Gallery
- 2008: Redlands Art Prize, Sydney
- 2009: Bravura, 21st Century Australian Craft, Art Gallery of South Australia
- 2013: Heartlands: Contemporary Art from South Australia, Art Gallery of South Australia
- 2014: Florabotanica, at the Adelaide Central Gallery
- 2014: The Microscope Project, an exhibition developed by Flinders University Art Museum in 2014, which included work by South Australian artists Valamanesh, Nic Folland, Ian Gibbins, Deb Jones, and Catherine Truman, as well as writer and artist Melinda Rackham. Emeritus professor Ian Gibbins was a neuroscientist, and Catherine Truman had worked with him as an artist-in-residence. The idea was to repurpose decommissioned scientific equipment and repurpose it into artworks. The exhibition, curated by Fiona Salmon and Maddie Reece, was installed at Flinders University's City Gallery, included sculpture, installation, moving image, sound, photography, and text.
- 2015: SALA, Contemporary Art Centre of South Australia, Adelaide
- 2016: Body of Evidence, Adelaide Convention Centre
- 2017: Everybody's Everything: Insect/Orchid, at the Barr Smith Library, University of Adelaide, an exhibition of ceramic art, inspired by research into the Rare Books and Special Collections, in particular orchids
- 2022: The art of both Angela and Hossein Valamanesh featured in the 2022 Adelaide Biennial of Australian Art: Free/State

== Collections ==
Among many institutional collections and private collections around the world, Valamanesh's work is held by the following:

- Aomori Contemporary Art Centre, Aomori, Japan
- Art Gallery of South Australia
- Artbank
- Curtin University
- La Trobe University
- National Gallery of Australia
- Newcastle Regional Art Gallery
- Parliament House Art Collection
- University of South Australia
- University of Adelaide
- Victorian College of the Arts
