= Clive Lucas =

Australian restoration architect

Clive Lucas OBE
- Born: 14 November 1943 (age 83); Sydney, New South Wales
- Education: University of Sydney
- Occupation: Architect
- Awards: Over 50 AIA Awards including 7 Greenway Awards & 9 Lachlan Macquarie Awards
- Practice: Lucas Stapleton Johnson & Partners Pty Ltd.

Clive Leslie Lucas OBE (born 14 November 1943) is an Australian restoration architect.

In 1970 Lucas and John Fisher founded the Sydney based heritage planning and architectural firm specialising in conservation, adaptation, and restoration of historic buildings and conservation planning known as Fisher Lucas. The firm is now known as Lucas Stapleton Johnson & Partners Pty Ltd. Since 1975, the firm has received over 50 Australian Institute of Architects awards, including 24 Merit Awards, 8 Architecture Awards and 2 Commendation Awards. The firm is the recipient of 7 Greenway Awards for restoration and 9 Lachlan Macquarie Awards for the best conservation project nationally. In addition, the firm has won numerous awards from the National Trust of Australia (NSW) and local councils. The firm has been involved with some of the most significant sites in Sydney and NSW including the adaptation of the Woolloomooloo Finger Wharf, the Sydney GPO, NSW Parliament House, Hyde Park Barracks, The Mint and the University of Sydney amongst many others.

Lucas is a former president of the National Trust of Australia (NSW) and former chairman of the Historic Houses Trust of NSW (now Museums of History NSW). The degree of Doctor of Science in architecture (honoris causa) was conferred upon Lucas by his alma mater in 2011. Lucas is described as "Sydney's most prominent heritage architect" by the Sydney Morning Herald.

== Early life ==
Lucas was born in Sydney and educated at Homebush Public School, Macquarie Boys’ High School and the University of Sydney where he received a B.Arch in 1966.

== Selected restoration and design works ==
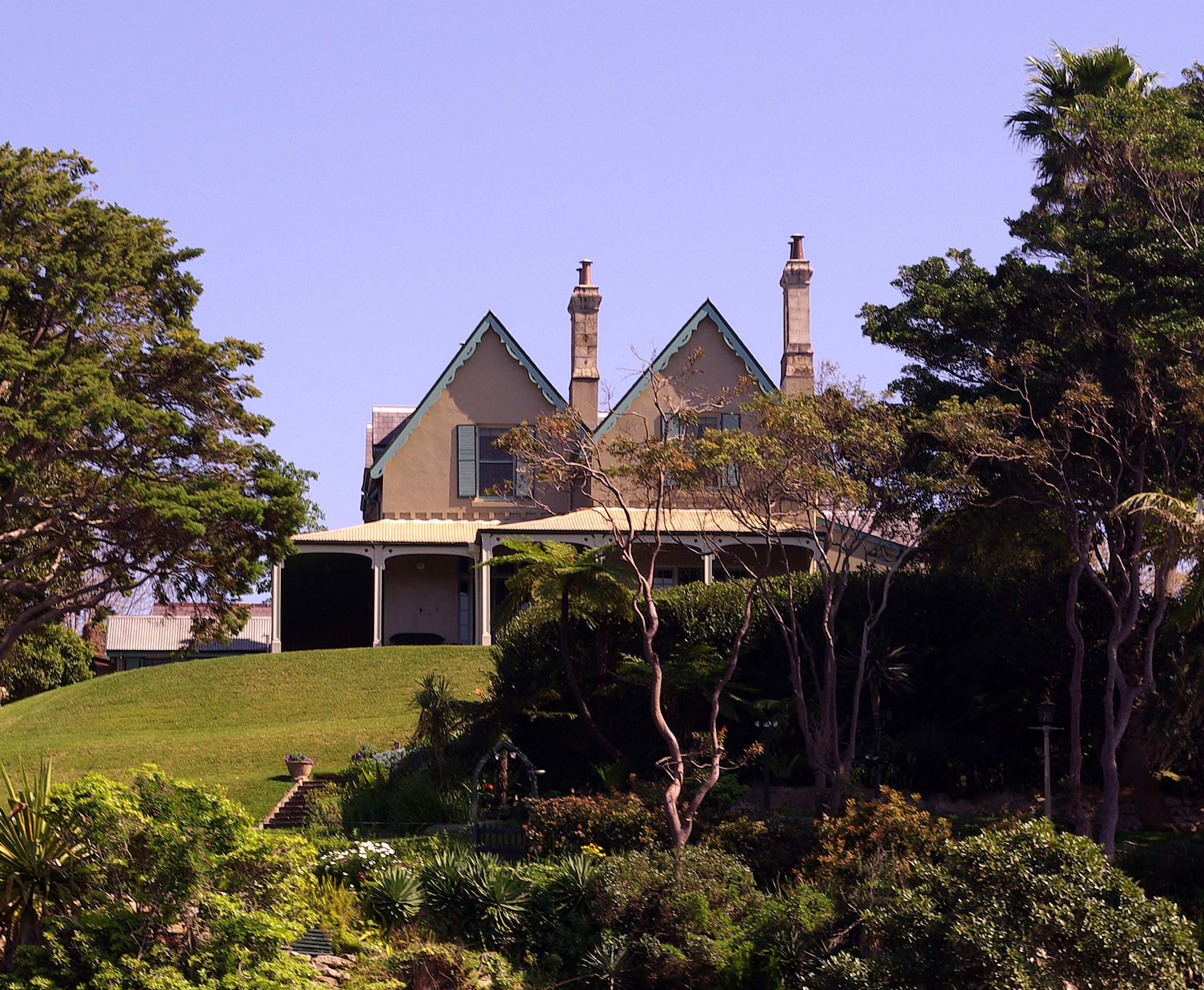
Kirribilli House, Sydney.

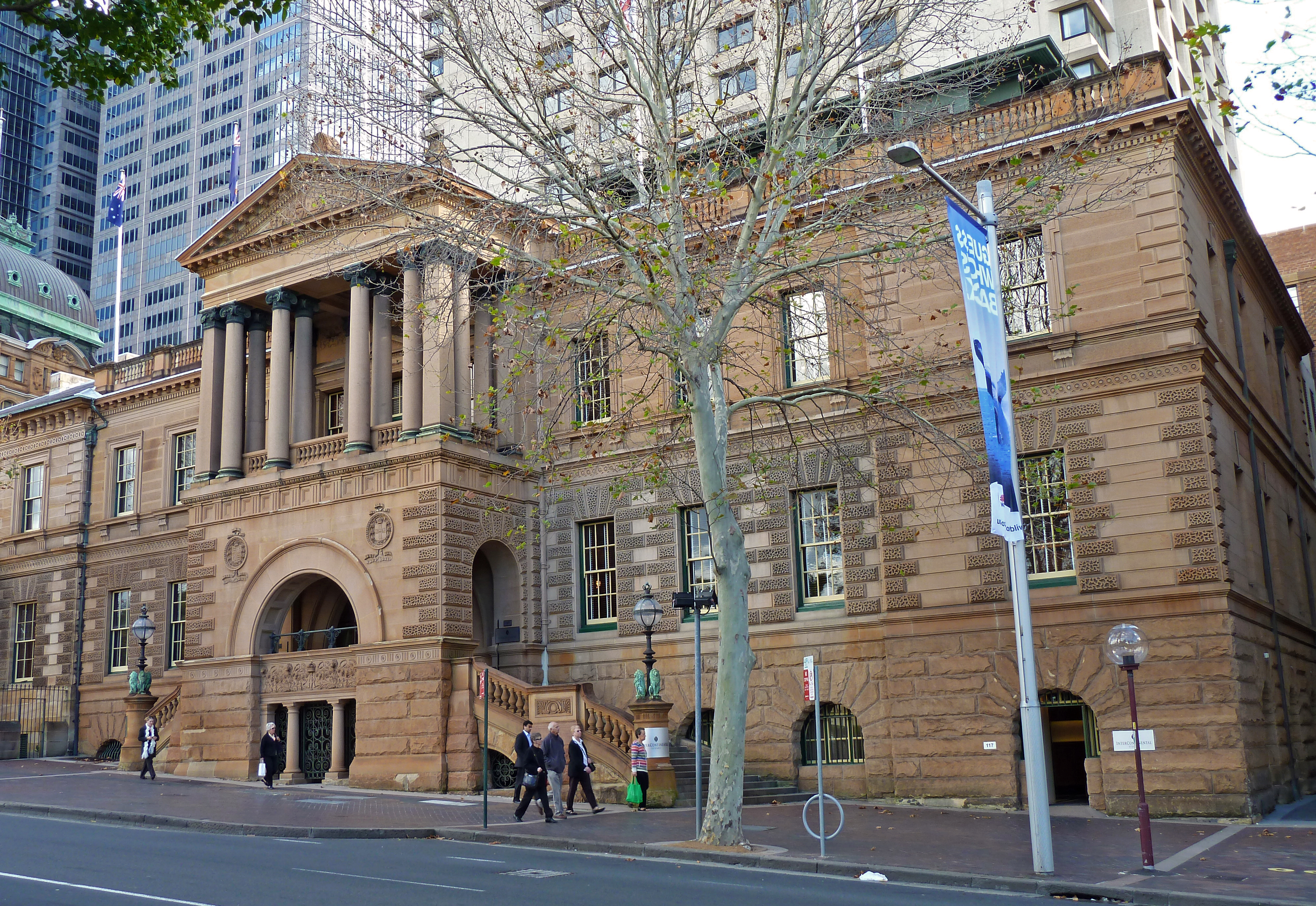
InterContinental Hotel, Sydney.

- The officers' Houses – Port Arthur, Tasmania
- Treasury Buildings (now InterContinental Hotel) – Macquarie Street, Sydney
- Kirribilli House – Prime Minister of Australia's residence, Sydney
- Lyndhurst – Glebe, New South Wales
- Old Government House – Parramatta, Museum of the National Trust of Australia (NSW)
- Hyde Park Barracks – Sydney, Museum of the Historic Houses Trust of New South Wales
- The Mint – Sydney, Headquarters of the Historic Houses Trust of New South Wales
- Treaty House – New Zealand
- Liner House – Bridge Street, Sydney
- Albert Wing, St. Paul's College – University of Sydney

== Publications ==
- Australian Colonial Architecture (1978)
- Colour Schemes for Old Australian Houses (1984) jointly
- Australian Country Houses (1987)

== Awards ==
- Officer, Order of the British Empire (1977)
- Lucas Stapleton Johnson & Partners has won 50 awards from the Australian Institute of Architects.
- 2012 Australian Institute of Architects Lachlan Macquarie Award for Heritage for the Restoration of Swifts, Darling Point
