= Hossein Valamanesh =

Iranian-Australian artist (1949–2022)

- Born: 2 March 1949; Tehran, Iran
- Died: 15 January 2022 (aged 72); Adelaide, South Australia
- Education: Tehran School of Art and South Australian School of Art
- Known for: Sculpture, painting, art installation
- Awards: Visual Arts Board grant, Australia Council; Grand Prize at the Dacca Biennale, Bangladesh

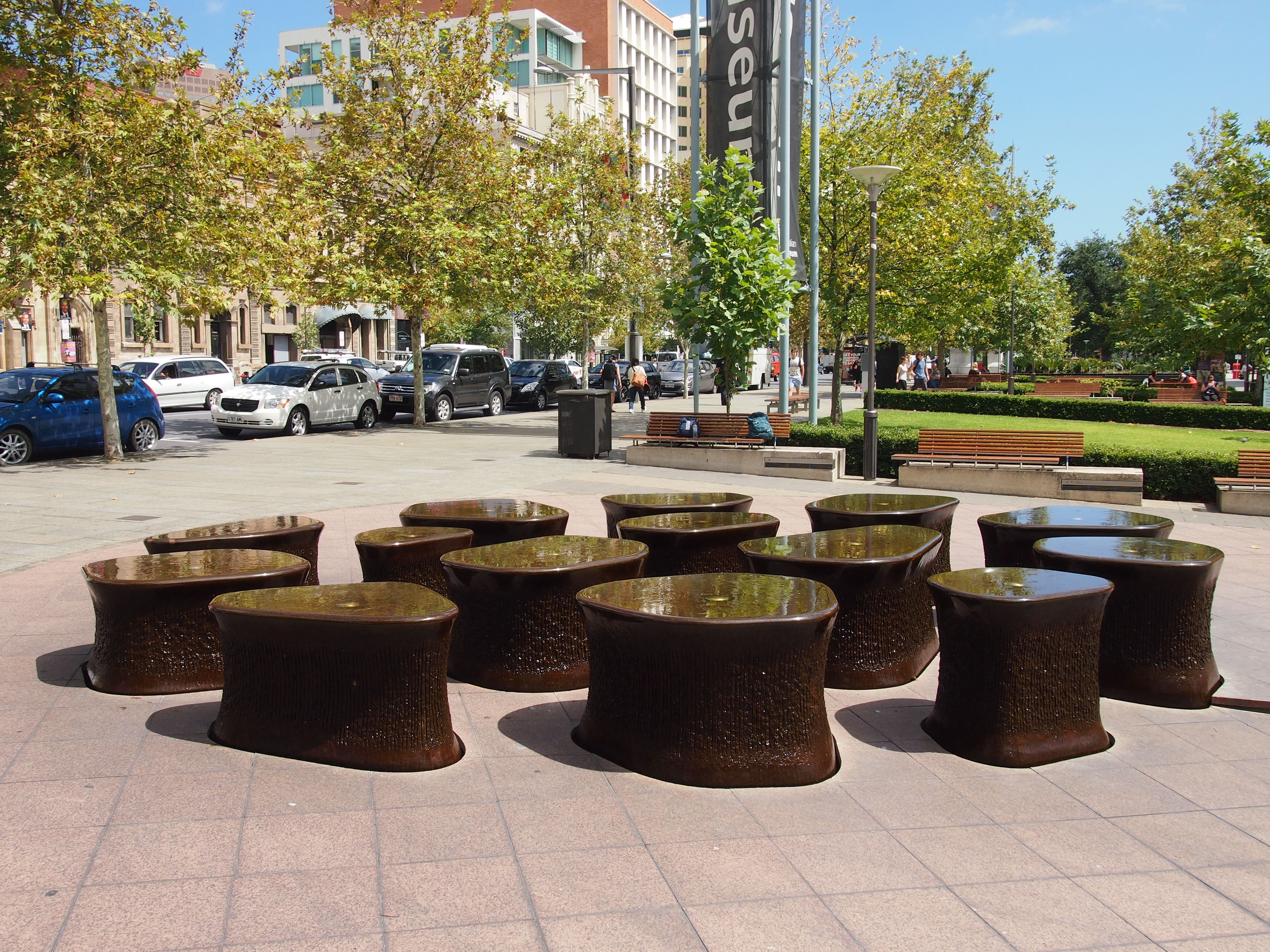
14 Pieces (2005) by Angela and Hossein Valamanesh, in front of the South Australian Museum

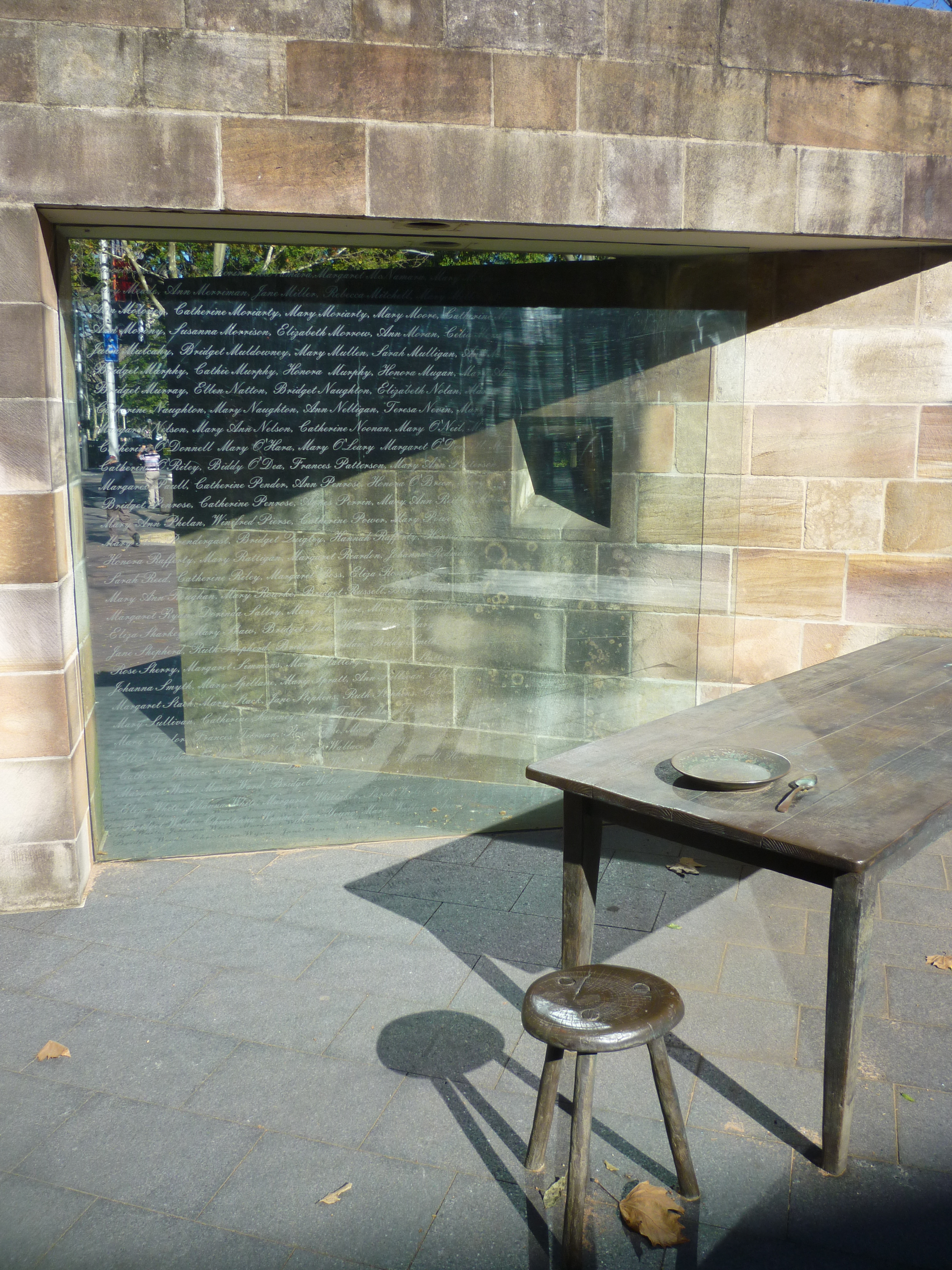
Australian Monument to the Great Irish Famine at Hyde Park Barracks, Sydney (1999)

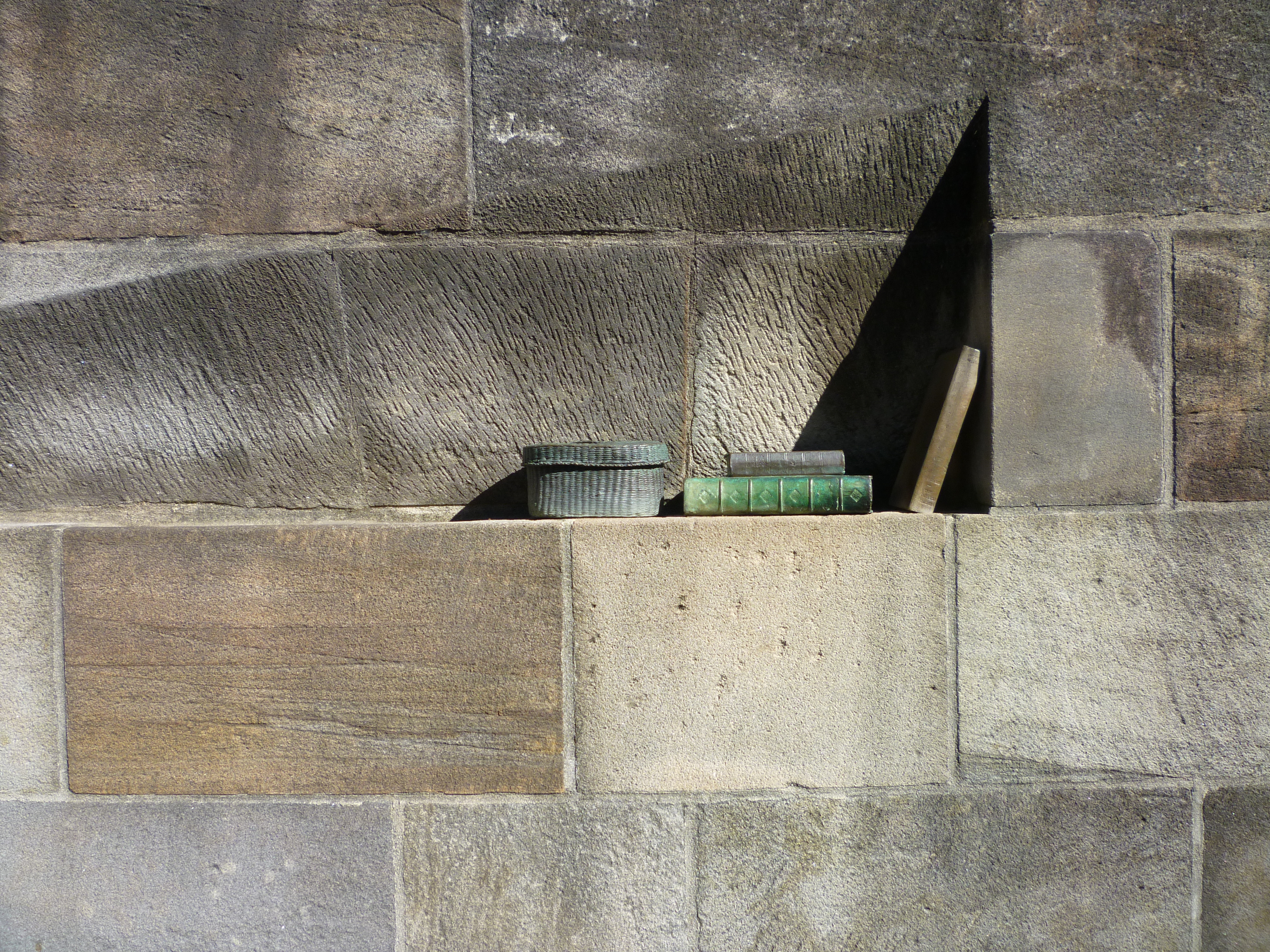
Detail of the Irish Famine memorial

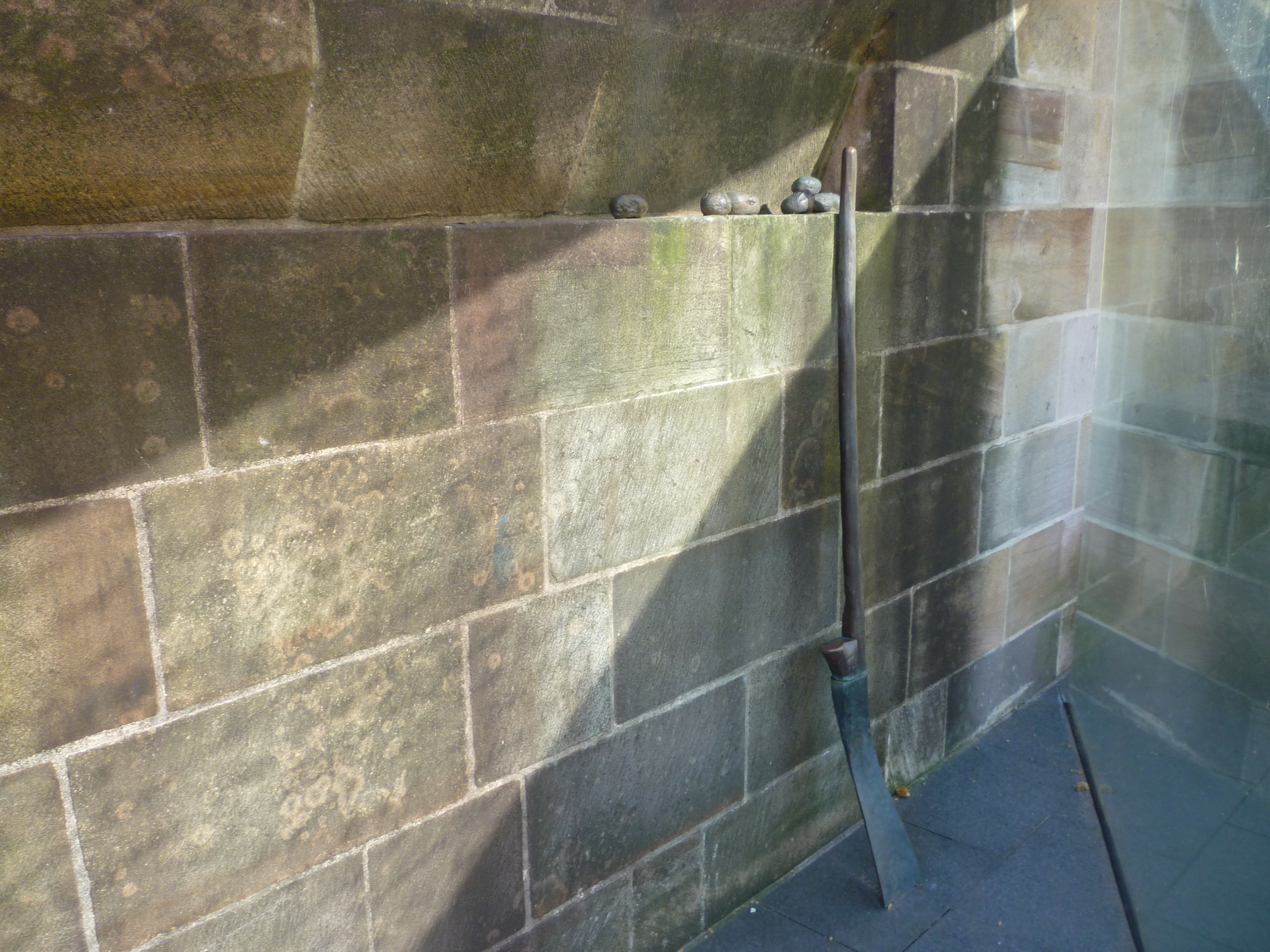
Detail of the Irish Famine memorial

Hossein Valamanesh AM (2 March 1949 – 15 January 2022) was an Iranian-Australian contemporary artist who lived and worked in Adelaide, South Australia. He worked in mixed media, printmaking, installations, and sculpture. He often collaborated with his wife, Angela Valamanesh.

== Early life and education ==
Hossein Valamanesh was born in Tehran, Iran on 2 March 1949. He worked with theatre director Bijan Mofid from 1968 to 1971, and graduated from at the Tehran School of Art in Tehran in 1970.

He emigrated to Perth, Western Australia, in 1973, and while living there travelled to remote Aboriginal communities in WA, where he felt a connection between their ancient culture and his own Persian culture. He worked with the Round Earth Company and Aboriginal children.

He continued his art education at the South Australian School of Art after moving to Adelaide in 1974, graduating in 1977.

== Art practice and works ==
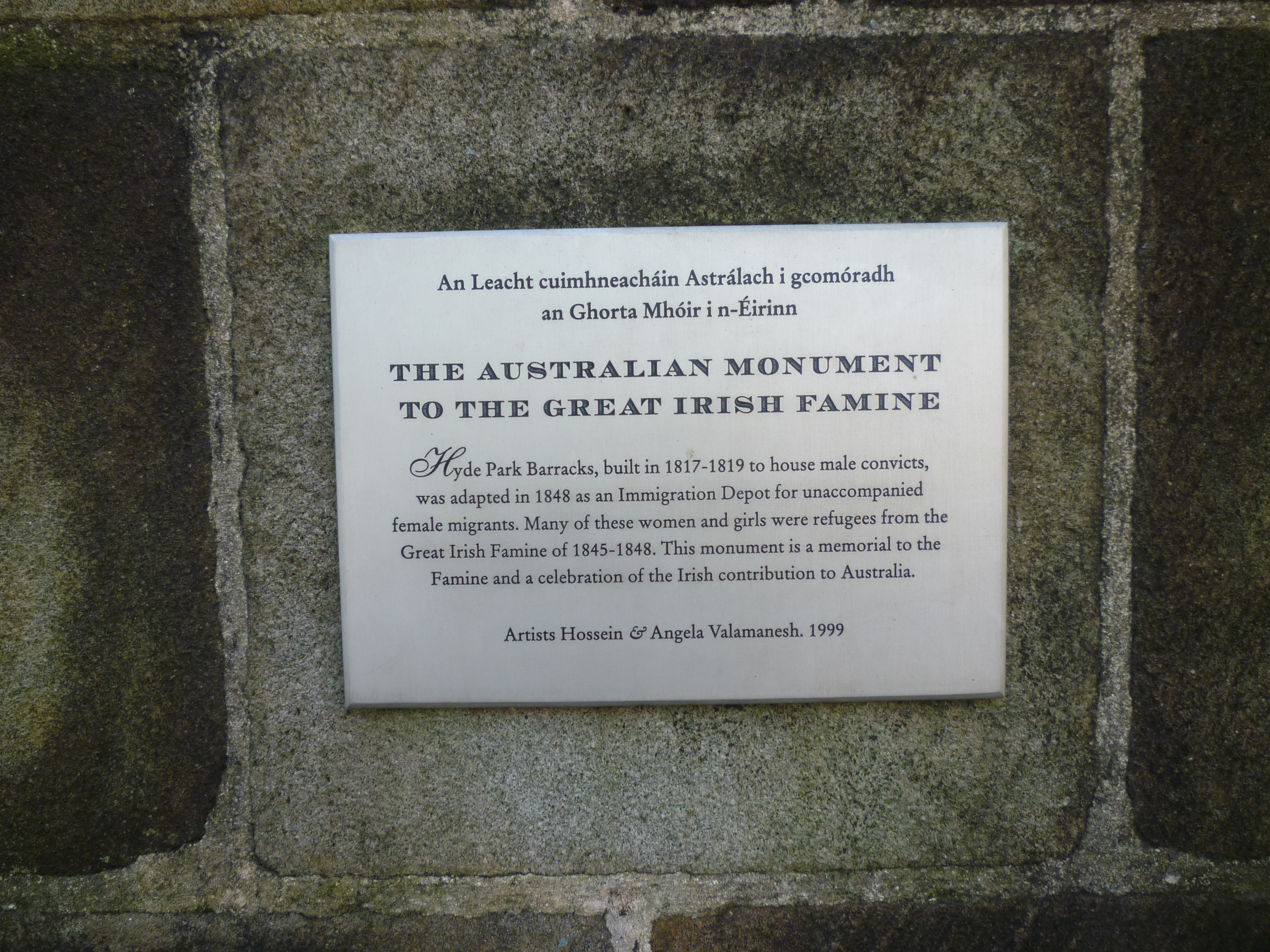
Descriptive plaque of The Australian Monument to The Great Irish Famine

His work, which includes sculpture, painting, installation, and video art explores "the paradoxes of selfhood, existence and being". It has been described as "known and loved for its spare aesthetic sensibility, parred back form and poetic visual imagery". He used natural materials, such as ochres, sand and stones, as well as leaves, branches, and twigs, and drew inspiration from Sufi philosophy and Persian poetry, in particular that of the poet Djalâl ad-Dîn Rûmî (a.k.a. Rumi). He also employed human forms and shadows.

He completed a number of major public art commissions, many with his wife Angela Valamanesh, also an artist.

His 1997 combined performance, photographic, and sculptural work Longing, belonging, which involved burning a Persian rug in the outback to explore the migrant experience, is in the collection of the Art Gallery of NSW

In 1998 he completed a large public artwork in Adelaide, Knocking from the inside, on the northern plaza of the Intercontinental Hotel on North Terrace.

Angela and he together created An Gorta Mor, the Australian Monument to the Great Irish Famine (1999), at Hyde Park Barracks, Sydney. The monument, one of many memorials to the catastrophe around the world, is incorporated into the wall surrounding the Barracks and "ironically, stands on the site of the original kitchens" there. The table, bowl, tools, and utensils are cast in bronze, and the names of 420 women who arrived as famine orphans are etched into the glass part of the memorial walls. Among the estimated 2,500 people attending the unveiling on 28 August 1999 were 800 famine orphan descendants.

In October 2005, a piece of public art by Angela and Hossein, incorporating water, 14 Pieces, situated on North Terrace in front of the South Australian Museum in Adelaide, was officially unveiled. Its form is based on the vertebrae of an extinct marine reptile, the ichthyosaur, held by the museum. Hossein and Angela were commissioned by the City of Adelaide to create the sculpture to replace the Lavington Bonython fountain that had occupied the site from 1965.

In 2008 he became involved with "The Rug Project", in which he used one of his works on paper, Crazing, made from stems of maidenhair fern, as the basis for a rug design.

Valamanesh worked closely over decades with the Art Gallery of South Australia in Adelaide.

== Recognition and awards ==
Valamanesh was awarded a number of fellowships, commissions, grants, residencies, and other honours, including:

- 1982: Visual Arts Board of the Australia Council for the Arts grant
- 1991: Visual Arts Board Fellowship Residency at Kunstlerhaus Bethanien
- 1997: Grand Prize at the 8th Asian Biennial
- 1998 Australia Council Fellowship in 1998.
- 2010: Member of the Order of Australia on the Queen's Birthday Honours List on 14 June 2010, "For service to the visual arts, particularly as a sculptor and through installation works and public art"

In 2013, Valamanesh featured in the ABC / BBC joint production documentary series The Art Of Australia hosted by Edmund Capon, in the first episode entitled Strangers in a Strange Land.

In November 2022, Valamanesh was posthumously awarded the South Australian Premier's Award for Lifetime Achievement in the Ruby Awards.

In 2007, Valamanesh was amongst 60 artists profiled in Sonia Payes' book Untitled. Portraits of Australian Artists.

== Major exhibitions ==
Valamanesh's work has featured in many group exhibitions as well as major and minor solo exhibitions. His work has been shown in over 30 solo exhibitions around the world, and been on display in Canada, France, United Kingdom, Switzerland, India, United Arab Emirates, Singapore, Japan, and Iran.

- 2001: the first major survey of Valamanesh's work was held at the Art Gallery of South Australia.
- 2002: Tracing the Shadow: Hossein Valamanesh Recent Works, Museum of Contemporary Art in Sydney.
- 2003: Hossein Valamanesh: natural selection, featuring a large selection of installations and smaller sculptural works, at the Drill Hall Gallery, Australian National University, Canberra, ACT
- 23 September 2021 – 19 February 2022: Puisque tout passe ("This Will Also Pass"), first European solo exhibition, at the Institut des cultures d'Islam in Paris.
- The art of both Angela and Hossein Valamanesh featured in the 2022 Adelaide Biennial of Australian Art: Free/State, from 4 March 2022.

== Later life, family and death ==
On 15 January 2022, Valamanesh died of a heart attack in Adelaide, at the age of 72. He was survived by his wife Angela AM and at least one child, Nassiem.

Angela Valamanesh was born in 1953 in Port Pirie, South Australia. She graduated from the South Australian School of Art in 1992, and subsequently earned an MA at the University of South Australia. She won the Anne & Gordon Samstag International Visual Arts Scholarship in 1996, using it to undertake postgraduate studies at the Glasgow School of Art in Scotland. She and Hossein undertook several public art projects together.

Nassiem Valmanesh, also an artist, studied filmmaking at the Victorian College of the Arts and as of 2021 lives in Melbourne. His work was featured in an exhibition with his father's at the Buxton Contemporary at the University of Melbourne, in 2021.

== Public art collections ==
Valamanesh's work is included in major public art collections in Australia and abroad, including:

- Alice Springs Art Centre, Alice Springs
- Artbank, Australia
- Art Gallery of New South Wales, Sydney
- Art Gallery of South Australia, Adelaide
- Art Gallery of Western Australia, Perth
- Gryphon Gallery, University of Melbourne
- Kadist Art Foundation, Paris, France
- Museum of Contemporary Art, Australia, Sydney, Australia
- Museum of New Zealand Te Papa Tongarewa, Wellington
- National Gallery of Australia, Canberra, Australia
- National Gallery of Victoria, Melbourne
- Newcastle Art Gallery, Newcastle, New South Wales
- Queensland Art Gallery, Brisbane
- Sara Hildén Art Museum, Finland
- University of South Australia, Adelaide
- University of Western Australia, Perth
- University of Queensland, Brisbane
- Western Australian Institute of Technology, Perth
