= Rosa Fiveash =

Australian scientific illustrator and botanical artist (1854-1938)

Rosa Catherine Fiveash
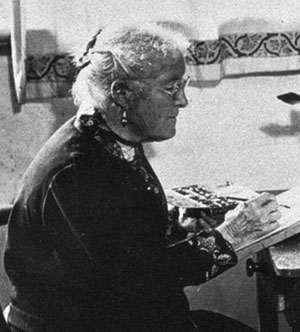
- Born: 22 July 1854; Adelaide, Australia
- Died: 13 February 1938 (aged 83); Adelaide, Australia
- Resting place: West Terrace Cemetery, Adelaide, Australia
- Known for: Botanical illustrations of Australian flora
- Notable work: South Australian Orchids, Flora of South Australia

Rosa Catherine Fiveash (22 July 1854, Adelaide – 13 February 1938, Adelaide) was an Australian botanical artist, illustrator and art teacher. She was a pioneer of china painting who introduced the technique to Adelaide.

Her best known paintings were done in collaboration with Professor Richard Sanders Rogers, published in South Australian Orchids in 1911.

== Life and education ==
Rosa Catherine Fiveash was born on 22 July 1854 in Adelaide, becoming the youngest child of businessman and superintendent of the Blinman and Yudanamutana copper mines Robert Archibald Fiveash and his wife Margaret, née Rees. From 1881 to 1888 she studied at the Adelaide School of Art. While studying under Harry Pelling Gill, Principal, and Louis Tannert, Master of the School of Painting, Fiveash chose painting of Australian flora as her specialization. Achieving high grades, she gained her art teacher's certificate from the Adelaide School of Art in 1888, and three years later, received accreditation from South Kensington in London. After graduation Fiveash taught art privately and at Tormore House School in North Adelaide for many years.

Apart from a trip to England in 1901, Fiveash lived all her life with her unmarried sister in the family house in North Adelaide. She remained unmarried herself, dedicating her life to illustrating South Australian flora.

Rosa Catherine Fiveash died on 13 February 1938 in Adelaide and was buried in West Terrace Cemetery.

== Work ==
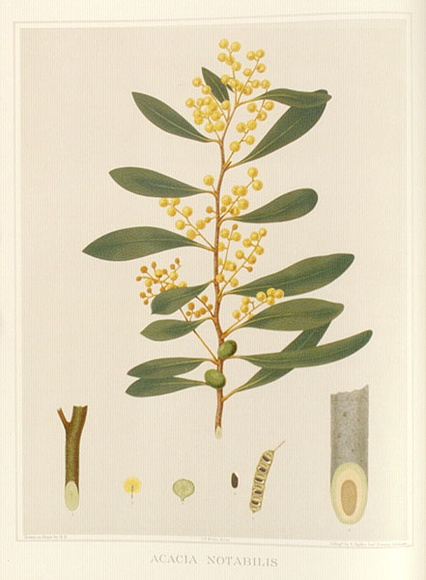
Illustration of Acacia notabilis by Rosa Fiveash

In 1882 Fiveash was commissioned by the government conservator of forests John Ednie Brown to illustrate Forest Flora of South Australia. Each of nine parts of this work, that were published between 1892 and 1890, contained five illustrations of Fiveash drawn in no particular botanical order. The commission to illustrate Forest Flora of South Australia established Fiveash her reputation as a botanical illustrator. Her works were described as outstanding detailed depiction of the flowering branches, as well as the floral parts, timber and bark of eucalypts.

After painting Fiveash's works were prepared for lithography by the South Australian Government lithographer Haucourt Barrett, who received a smaller share of credit comparing to Fiveash. Enlarged drawings from Forest Flora were reproduced upon the walls in the South Australian Court of the 1886 and Indian Exhibition in London. Also a pair of kookaburras painted by Fiveash were chosen to present the colony. Fiveash finished nearly 70 plates for Brown when the project fell through due to the lack of money. Brown never completed his Forest Flora of South Australia.

In 1888 a set of Fiveash's painted panels was exhibited at the school of Art in Adelaide, receiving special mention by an anonymous art critic for The South Australian Register.

Fiveash's next commission was to illustrate the paper by Professor Edward C. Stirling Description of a New Genus and Species of Masupialia, Notorycytes Typhlops published in 1891. Her seven of the colored plates accompanied Stirling's description of newly discovered marsupial mole, as well as 322 illustrations of toas Aboriginal direction signs, for a later paper by Stirling and E. R. Waite.

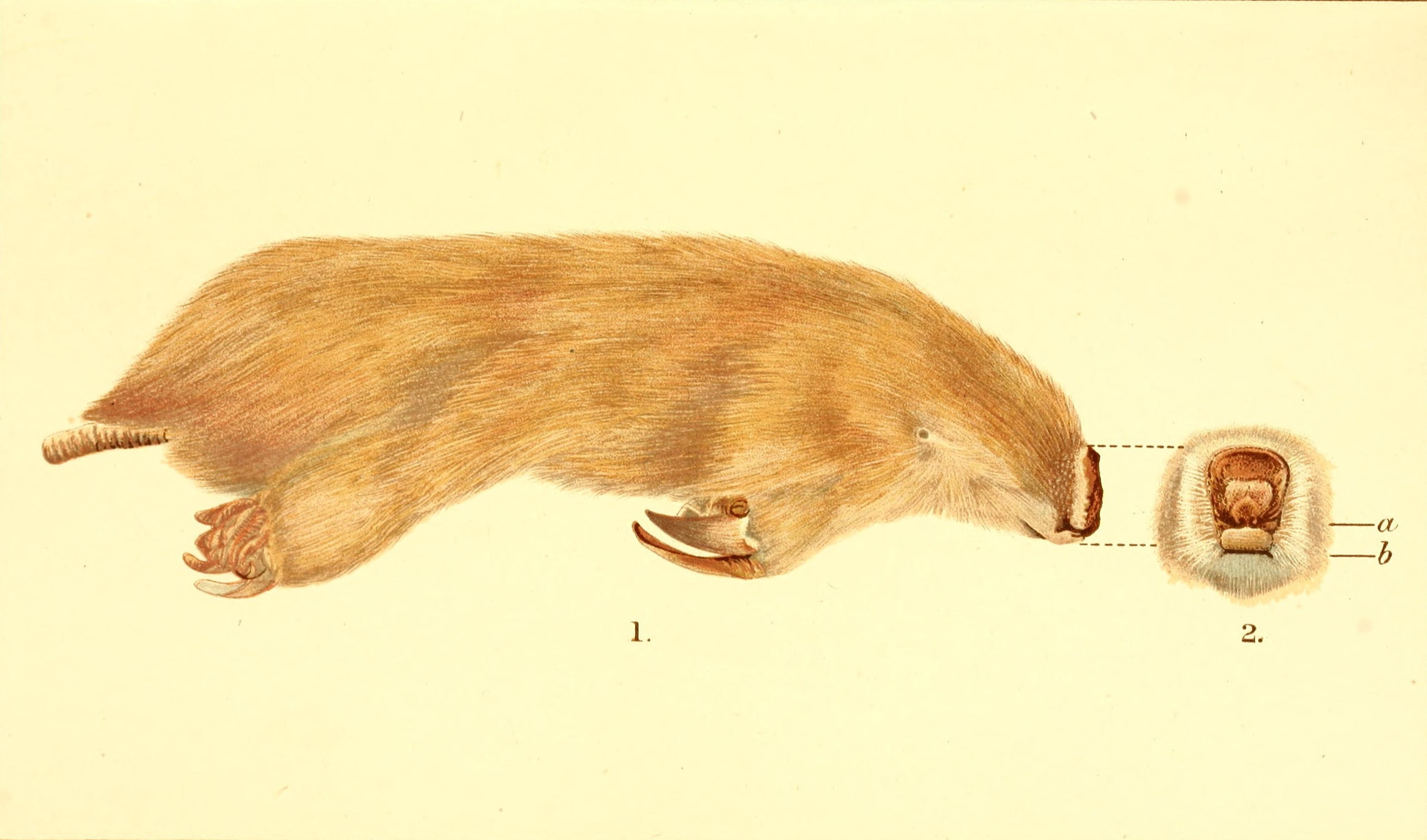
Notoryctes typhlops 1891 (crop)

After visiting Victoria in the 1880s to enhance her china painting technique and learn the firing process, Fiveash returned to the art school in Adelaide where she taught this technique from 1894 to 1896. She pioneered china painting in Adelaide, attending to all the stages of the technique process. During the Victorian era china painting was fashionable in England and many homes had a china cabinet. Even after 1896, when the fashion for china painting faded away and the class was abandoned, Fiveash continued making pieces in this technique for several decades into the twentieth century.

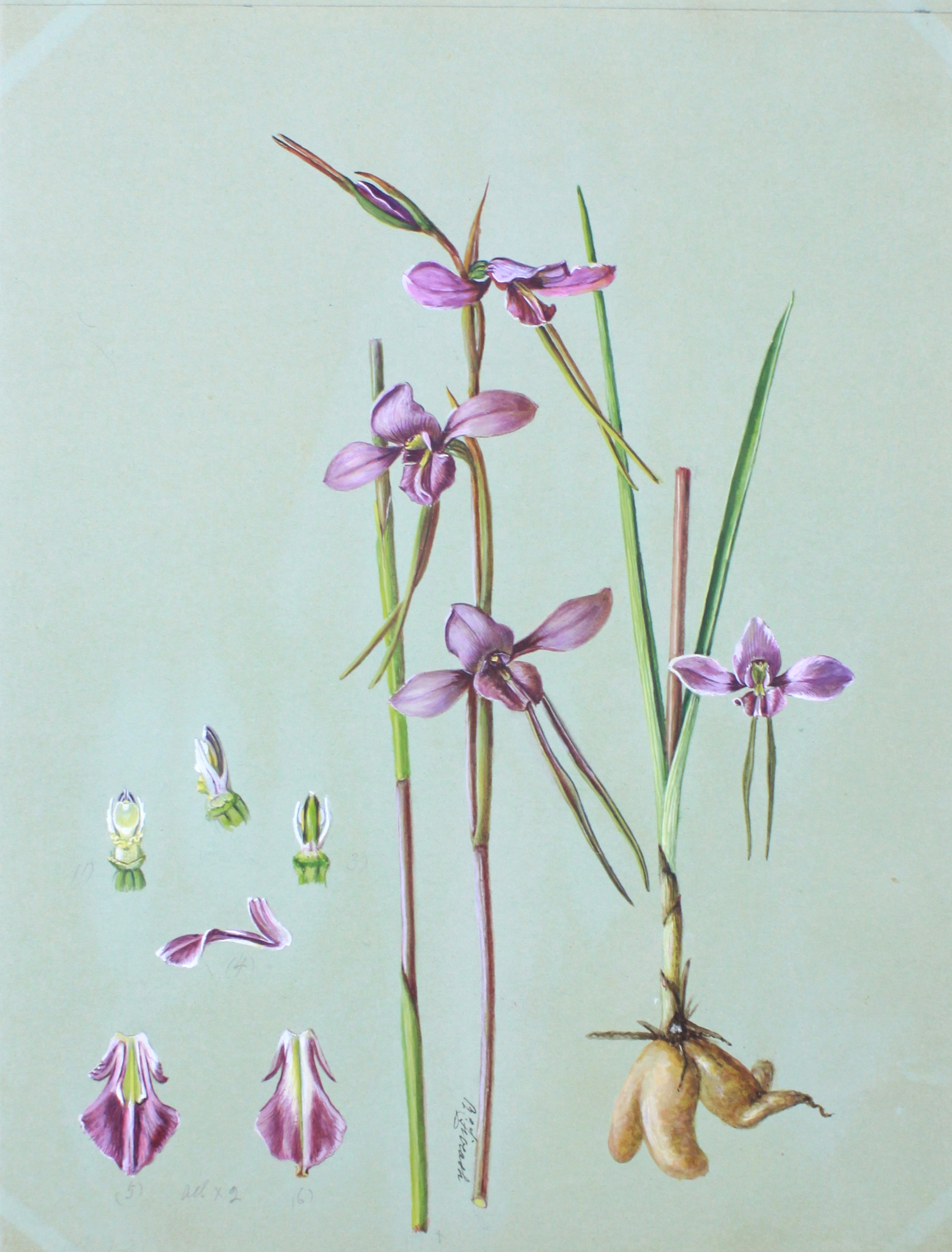
Illustration of orchids by Rosa Fiveash

In 1900 Fiveash's portfolio with flower-paintings so impressed the governor Lord Tennyson and philanthropist Robert Barr Smith that they purchased the pictures as the gift to the colony.

In 1908 Professor and orchidologist Richard S. Rogers persuaded Fiveash to concentrate on orchids and she quickly developed an ‘orchid eye’. Rogers provided Fiveash with a set of Zeiss lenses and fresh specimens and Fiveash provided him the illustrations for his publications. Their collaboration spanned thirty years. They produced together An Introduction to the Study of South Australian Orchids (1909), Some South Australian Orchids (1911) and a section for J. Black's Flora of South Australia (1922). Fiveash's orchid paintings were also published in Illustrated Australian Encyclopaedia (1926).

Fiveash continued painting until the age of 80. In 1937 she presented many of her paintings to the Public Library of South Australia. In 1957 her paintings were moved from the Art Gallery to the South Australian Museum, and finally to the Botanic Gardens of Adelaide in 1979.

Fiveash Street, in the Canberra suburb of Chisholm, is named in her honour.

== Exhibitions ==
- 1888 – Adelaide School of Art, Adelaide
- 1994 – South Australian Women Artists: paintings from the 1890 to the 1940, Art Gallery of South Australia, Adelaide

== Collections ==
- State Library of South Australia
- Botanic Gardens of Adelaide and State Herbarium, Adelaide, SA

== List of illustrated books ==
- 1890 – The Forest Flora of South Australia
- 1906 – Orchid paintings
- 1911 – An Introduction to the Study of South Australian Orchids
- 1922 – Flora of South Australia
- 1926 – Illustrated Australian Encyclopaedia
- 1974 – Australian Orchids
- 1982 – Rosa Fiveash's Australian orchids: a collection of paintings by Rosa Catherine Fiveash
- 1982 – Rosa Fiveash's Australian orchids
- 2017 – Angela Valamanesh: everybody's everything: insect/orchid: 20 August -1 October 2017 (about artist Angela Valamanesh)
