= Aomori Contemporary Art Centre =

Aomori Contemporary Art Centre (ACAC)
- 青森公立大学国際芸術センター青森
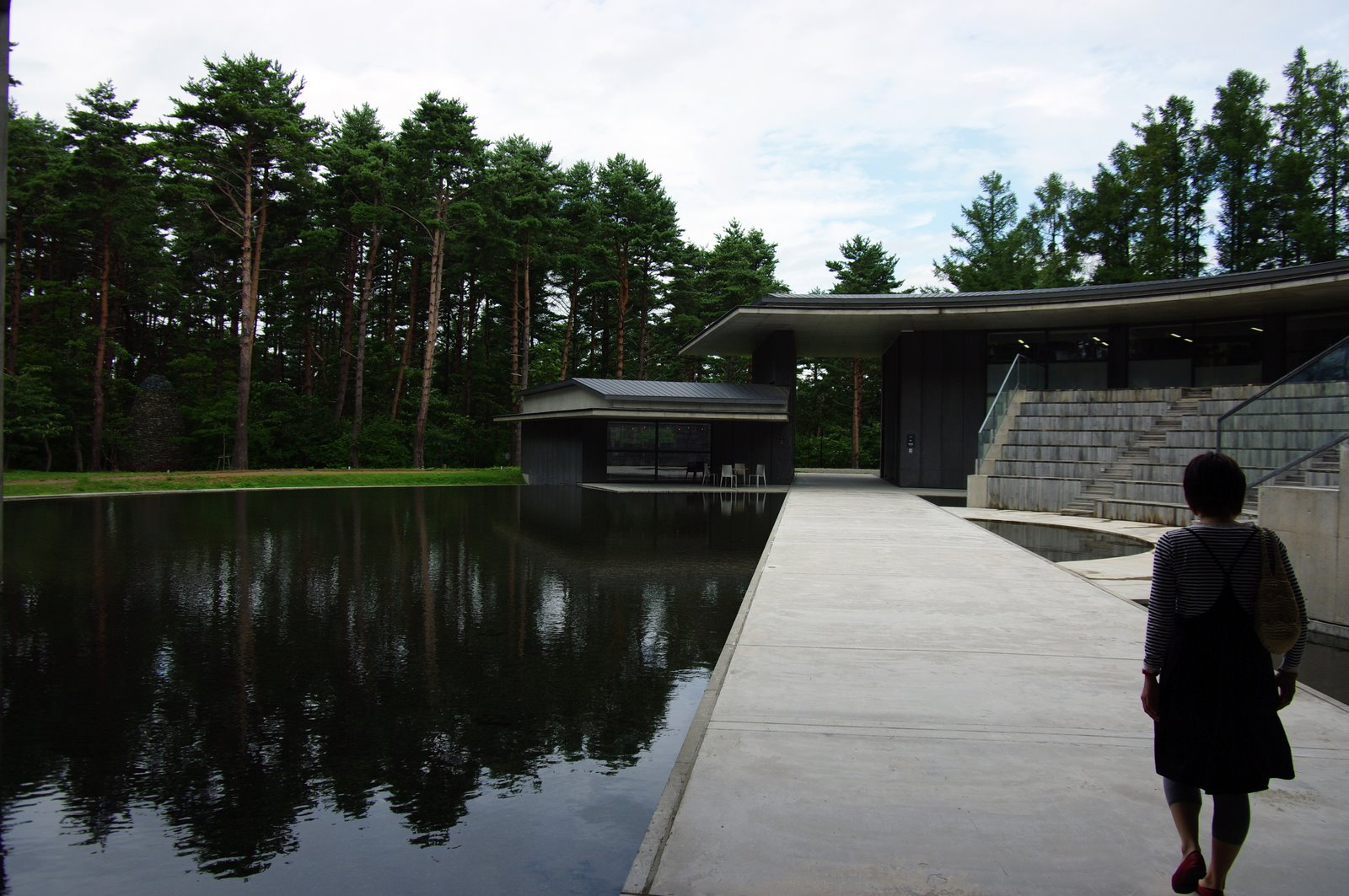

General information
- Location: 152-6, Yamazaki, Goshizawa, Aomori, Aomori Prefecture, Japan
- Coordinates: 40°45′17″N 140°46′17″E
- Opened: December 2001

Website
- Official website

Aomori Contemporary Art Centre (青森公立大学国際芸術センター青森, Aomori Kōritsu Daigaku Kokusai Geijutsu Sentā Aomori) opened in Aomori, Aomori Prefecture, Japan in 2001. Designed by architect Tadao Ando and operated by Aomori Public University, the institution's activities include exhibitions, education initiatives, and an artist-in-residence programme.

== See also ==
- Aomori Museum of Art
